= Jamalabad Gojal =

Village in Gilgit Baltistan, Pakistan

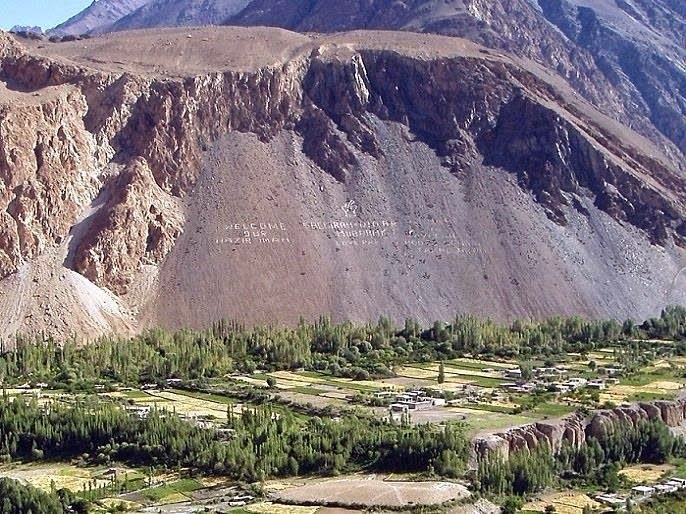

- Location within Gilgit Baltistan Location within Pakistan
- Coordinates: 36.618°N 74.863°E
- Country: Pakistan
- Territory: Gilgit Baltistan

Jamalalabad is a small village in Gojal Valley in the upper part of Hunza, Pakistan, located beside the Hunza river on the Karakorum Highway. It is believed to have a population of between 750 and 800.

== History ==
The village was formed in 1954 when Mir of Hunza Mir Muhammad Jamal Khan ordered the creation of a water channel for irrigation along the hill in front of Murkhun Village. Nazar Khawaja and Muhammad Saleem was first person to migrate to Jamalabad and migrated from Ghalabad, followed by Nasir Khan of Khudabad.

== Geography ==
The village is near the border with China, is less than 100 kilometres from Jamalabad, and the village is roughly 190 kilometers away towards China from the city of Gilgit. The village's altitude is about more than 2400 meters above the Arabian Sea level. The village is also surrounded by the ice-capped mountains of the Karakoram Range. Fruits are the best part of this village, which includes Apricot, Apple, Mulberry and Green cherry. Snow leopards and ibexes can be found in this valley in the winter season.

== Population ==
The majority of the village's population consists of Wakhi people. Some families of this village are settled in different cities of Pakistan.

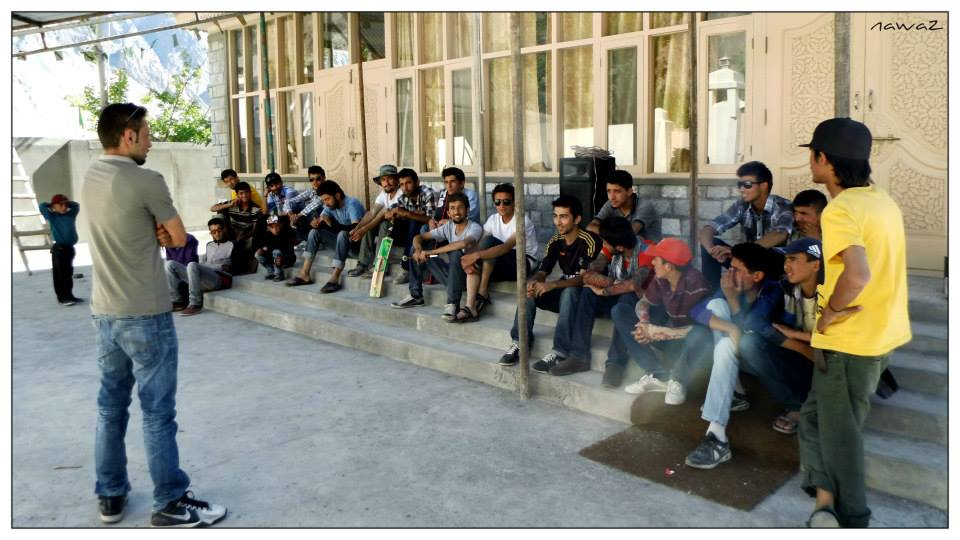
Group of youths in Jamalalabad

== Economy ==
People of this village have sources of income other than farming including hotels, restaurants and shops in Sost. The Sost village is popular because of its Pakistani-Chinese dry port, where goods imported from China, then transferred to Pakistani trucks before being distributed in the major cities of Pakistan. Some of the village's people are working in different cities of Pakistan, while a smaller number are working in foreign countries.

== Language and culture ==
The majority of the village's people speak the Wakhi language. Some of the village's people also speak Brushaski and almost all of the people of this village can speak and understand both the Wakhi and Brushaski languages.

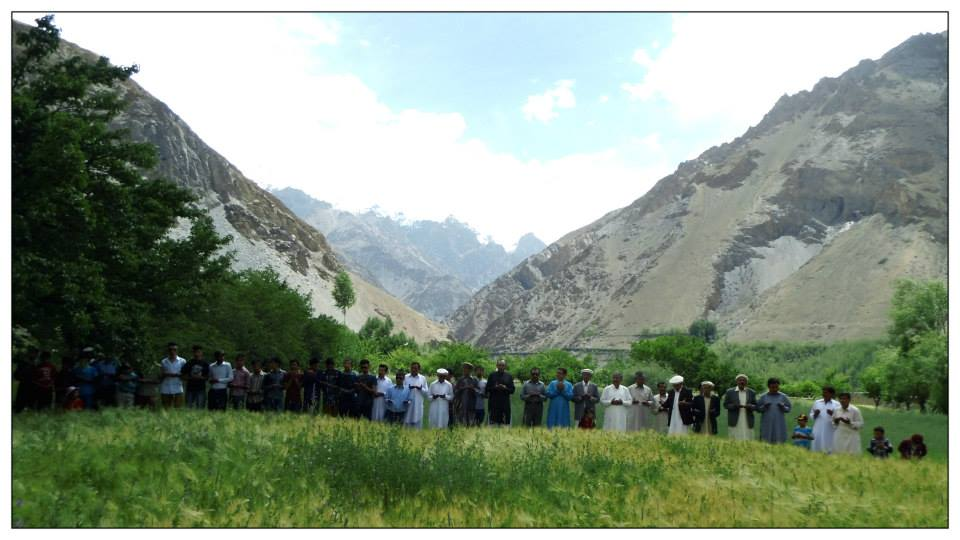
Celebration of event (Ginani)

== Surrounding area ==
The nearest villages are Moorkun Village, Gircha Village and Sust. Jamalabad is also close to Attabad Lake which formed in January 2010 following a naturally occurring landslide dam.
