= Hussaini Suspension Bridge =

Bridge over Hunza River, Pakistan

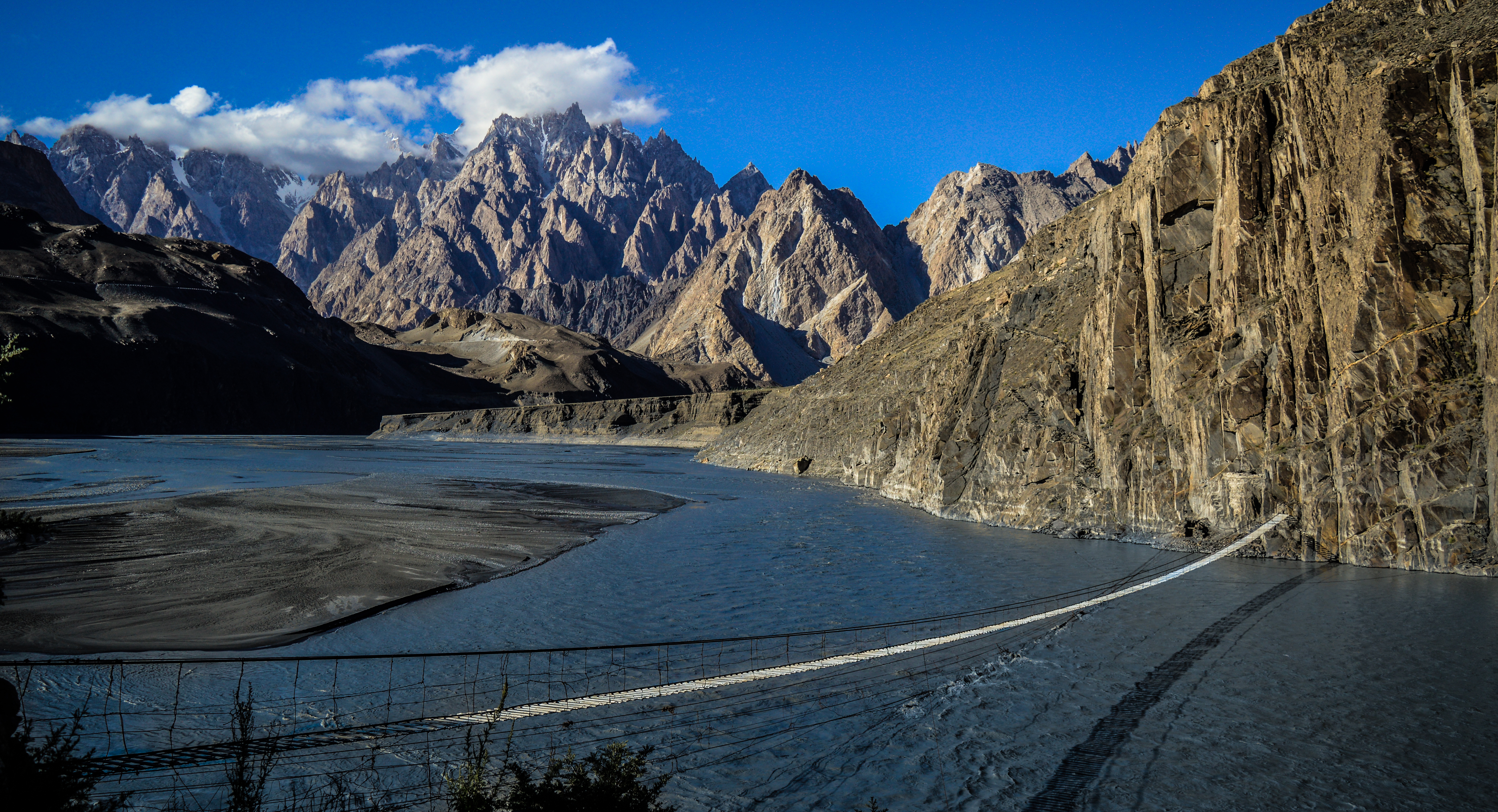
- A view of the bridge with the peaks of Passu Cones partially covered by miniature clouds in the background c. 2016
- Coordinates: 36°25′25.7″N 74°52′57.1″E
- Carries: Pedestrians
- Crosses: Hunza River
- Locale: Gojal Tehsil, Hunza Valley, Gilgit-Baltistan, Pakistan
- Official name: Hussaini Suspension Bridge
- Other name: Hussaini Hanging Bridge
- Named for: Hussaini Village

Characteristics
- Design: Simple suspension bridge
- Material: Wooden boards
- Trough construction: Ropes
- Total length: 194 m (635 ft)

History
- Engineering design by: Traditional method
- Rebuilt: Yes

Statistics
- Daily traffic: Pedestrians (in limited numbers at a time)
- Toll: Yes

Location
- Interactive map of Hussaini Suspension Bridge

Hussaini Suspension Bridge (Urdu: حسینی سسپنشن پل) is a pedestrian hanging bridge over the Hunza River in Gilgit Baltistan's Karakoram range. It was originally built for local access but has become a popular tourist attraction due to its striking structure and dramatic location.

== Description ==
The bridge is situated in the Gojal area of Hunza District, at a distance of some 45 km (28 mi) from the town of Aliabad and 132 km (82 mi) away in the northeast of Gilgit, the capital city of Gilgit-Baltistan region. Reachable through a path from the Karakoram Highway, the bridge provides a passageway between the Hussaini and Zarabod villages of the Upper Hunza over the Hunza River. A bridge at the site was originally built around 1968. Followed by the devastation from the 2010 Attabad landslide, the bridge was reconstructed later. The 194 m (635 ft) long suspended structure consists of rectangular wooden planks held utilizing six main ropes that support the entire length. Kept between the consecutive wooden planks of the bridge are the larger spaces which are intended to resist the wobbly vibrations in the whole structure when driven by the wind. In 2013, the American travel magazine, Condé Nast Traveler listed the bridge among the dangerous cross bridges in the world.

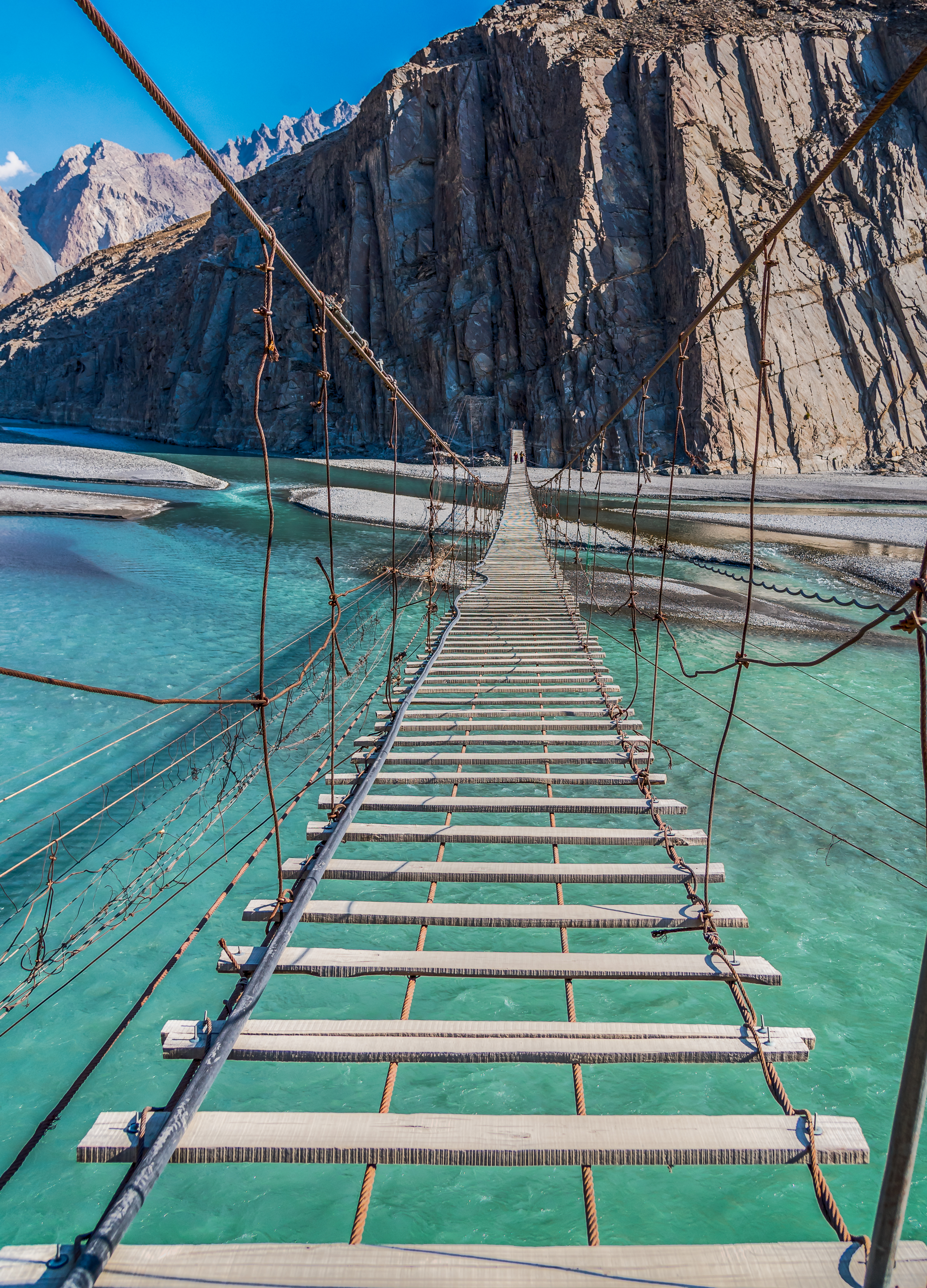
A closer look at the bridge

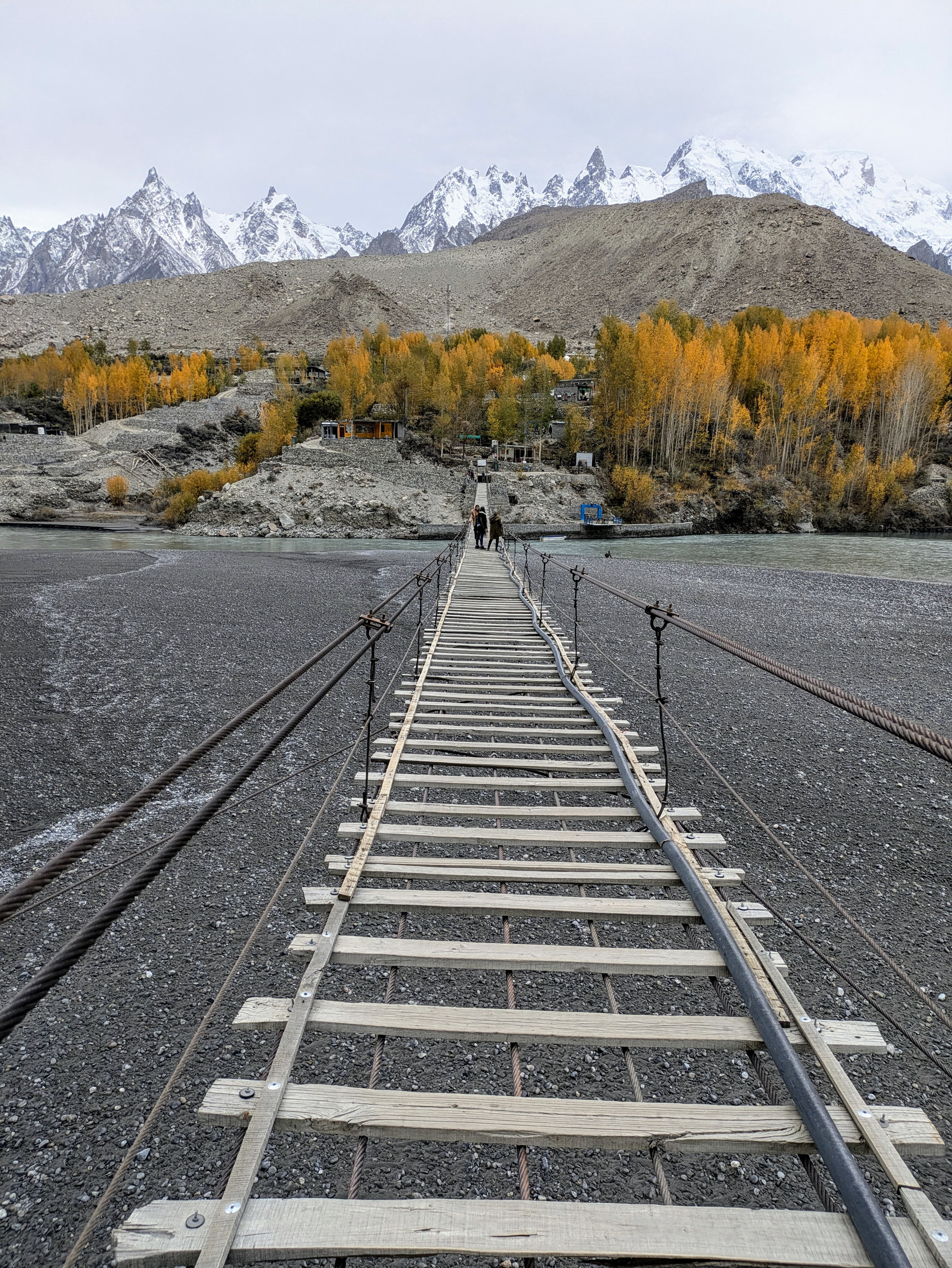
The bridge in autumn from the other side

In order to visit and cross the bridge, tourists have to follow some necessary precautions such as the use of life jackets.

=== Incident ===
In July 2022, a student from Sindh reportedly died of drowning in the Hunza River after falling from the bridge. His body was found from the river near Gulmit after a 2-3 hour search operation by the local authorities with a rescue team. The tehsil assistant commissioner of Gojal claimed that the deceased was an epilepsy patient and might have fallen off the bridge following a seizure. The bridge was sealed off for some days till the complete investigations of the case.
