= Nazemabad, Gilgit-Baltistan =

Nazemabad ناظم آباد
- Village
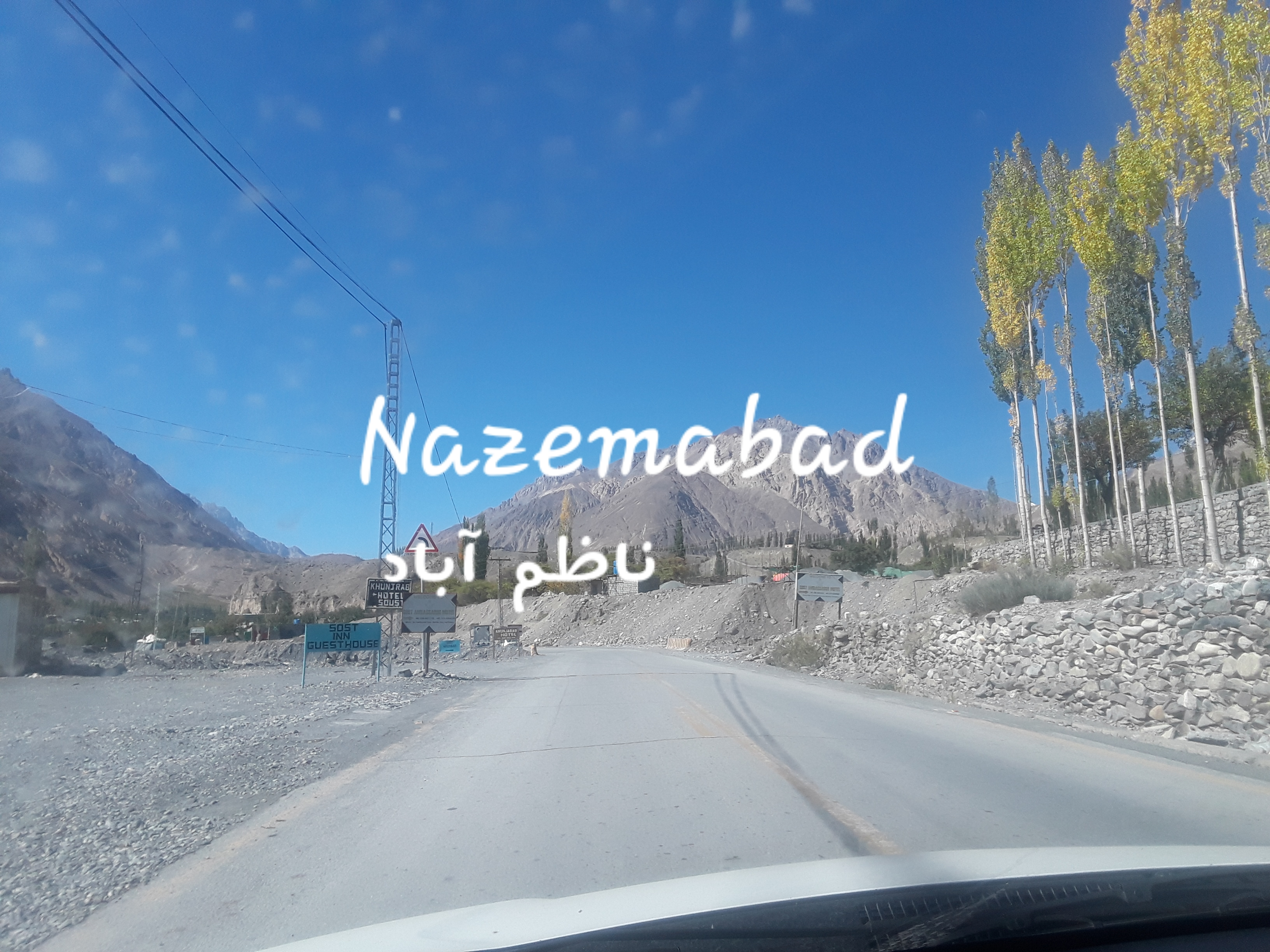
- Nazemabad

- Location within Gilgit Baltistan
- Coordinates: 36.66812°N 74.84243°E
- Country: Pakistan
- Territories of Pakistan: Gilgit-Baltistan
- District: Diamer
- Elevation: 11,211 m (36,781 ft)
- Time zone: UTC+05:00 (PKT)

Nazemabad or Nazimabad (Wakhi: نَاطِم ابآد ڙَت, Urdu: ناظم آباد گاؤں) is a village in Gojal tehsil, Hunza District, Gilgit-Baltistan in Pakistan. It is close to Gircha. There are around 800 people who are mostly Wakhi.
