= Gojal Tehsil =

Valley in Gilgit-Baltistan, Pakistan

Gojal
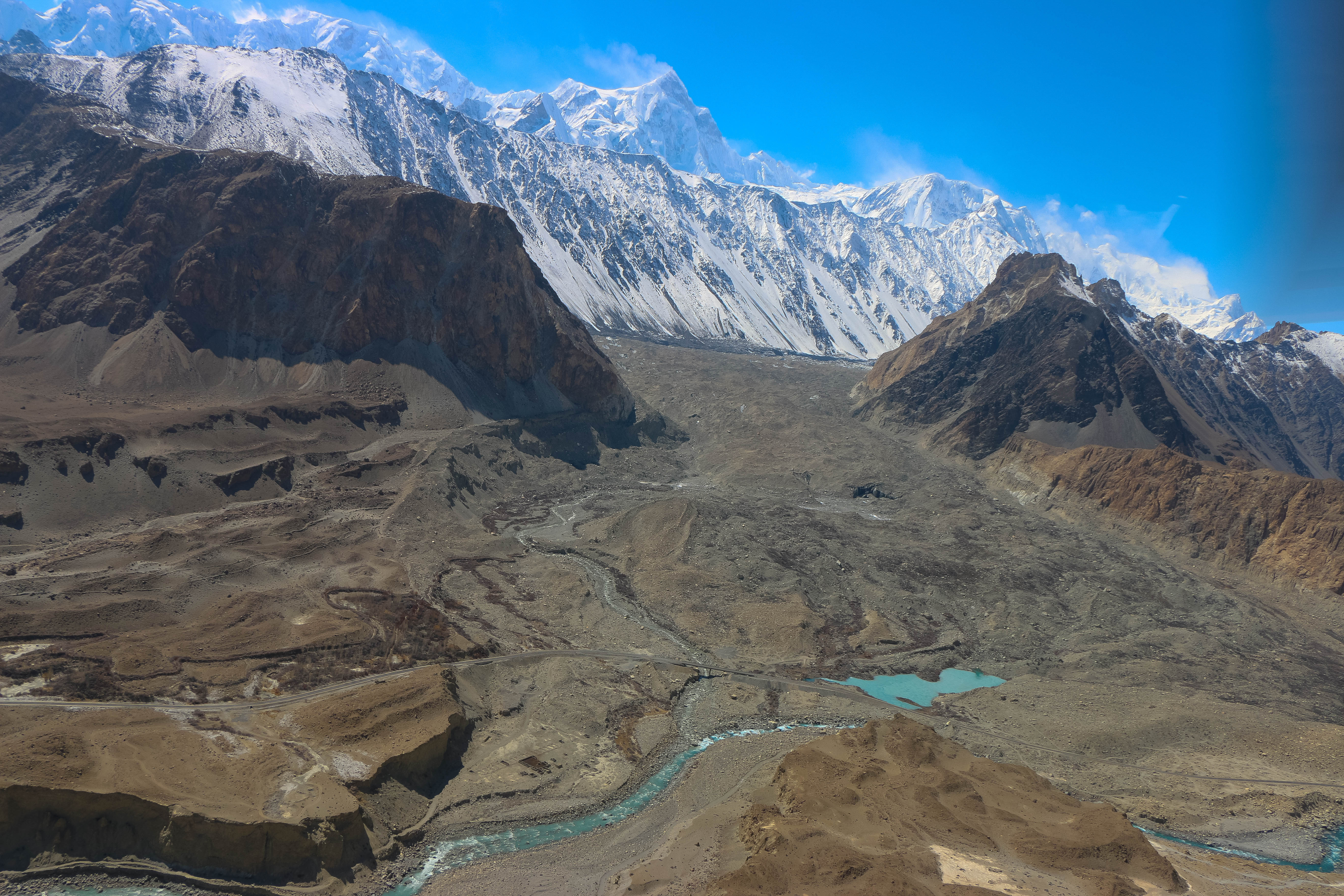
- The Batura glacier, one of the longest outside the Polar region, is in passu Gojal.

- Location within Gilgit Baltistan Location within Pakistan

Naming
- Native name: وادی گوجال (Urdu)
- English translation: Vādi Gujāl; Gujāl Örönü

Geography
- Country: Pakistan
- State/Province: Gilgit-Baltistan
- District: Hunza District
- Coordinates: 36.39°N 74.87°E
- Interactive map of Gojal

Gojal (Wakhi: وادی گوجال, Kyrgyz: گۉجال ۅرۅنۇ,), also called Upper Hunza, is situated in northwestern Pakistan. It borders China at the Khunjerab Pass and the Shimshal valley, and Afghanistan at the Chapursan valley. In 2019, Gojal Valley became the second Karachukar sub-division within the Hunza District. It is geographically the largest subdivision of Gilgit-Baltistan.

Gojal or Upper Hunza is composed of a number of large and small valleys sharing borders with Central Hunza to the south, China in the northeast, and Afghanistan in the northwest. Ainabad is the first village of Gojal. Except for the Shimshal, Misgar, and Chapursan valleys, all the villages of Gojal can be seen from the Karakoram Highway (KKH), which passes through the tehsil and enters China at the Khunjerab Pass. The Gojal region has 20,000 Ismaili residents. Gojal is predominantly populated by the Wakhi people.

== History ==
The valleys and villages of Gojal were settled over time by people from surrounding regions. Kyrgyz nomads initially used the areas in Upper Gojal as winter pastures. Wakhis migrated from Wakhan to this region, the Yishkuk, Chapursan Valley, the Avgarch area of Gircha and Sost villages were settled in the upper Gojal while in the lower Gojal Hussaini is considered an ancient settlement. When Hunza was under the Central Government of Gilgit, the Ishkook settlement was wealthy and paid cattle and other dairy products to the Raja of Gilgit. As Hunza emerged as an independent state during the early 15th century so it can be inferred that different valleys in upper Gojal were inhabited by the Wakhi speaking migrants prior to the emergence of the Hunza state. Later, the oral history holds, a catastrophic flood destroyed the Ishkook settlement during the 18th century.

The dominance of Central Hunza or Kanjud became significant during Mir Shah Salim Khan's period (1790-1824). Shah Salim Khan was raised by his foster mother, lady Gulbahar, wife of Ashoor of the Budlay family of Gulmit Gojal. Lady Gulbahar was the daughter of Qazi Makhtum, the Qazi of Wakhan. When Shah Salim Khan became the Mir of Hunza he paid attention to the expansion of the settlements of Gulkin and Gulmit and initiated the resettlement of Chipusan to increase revenue. One of the wives of Salim Kha, Princes Khushal Begum was the daughter of Qalam Ashqagha of Siriqol. On her wedding, Khushal Begum's father gifted her agriculture and grazing land and rights over collection of taxes from settlements in Siriqol. Through this, the state of Hunza extended its control to the areas of Siriqol. From Khushal Begum Mir Salim Khan had a son named Shah Abdullah Khan who was the youngest amongst five other sons of the Mir. Mir Shah Salim Khan died in 1824 in Gulmit. Subsequently, his elder son Shah Ghazanfar Khan (1824-1864) became the Mir of Hunza. Mir Shah Ghazanfar deputed his younger brother Shah Abdullah Khan as the Governor of Gojal and also assigned him the additional responsibility of the Commander of the forces of Hunza. It was this time when the resettlement of Chipursan valley was materialized by moving families from Gulmit, Gulkin, Hussaini, and Passu villages and bringing major parcels of land under irrigation. During this period Hunza emerged as a regional power and extended its borders to Siriqol, Yarqand, and Wakhan. The Wakhi people of Gojal emerged as warriors and took part in many wars. The forces of Hunza fought and won wars against Khojas, Kyrgyz people, and Badakhshan. During Abdullah Khan's period, Gojal emerged as a stronghold and the center became increasingly dependent both for its revenue and military power on Gojal. This increasing dependency on Gojal and increasing power of Abdullah Khan was seen as a threat by many in the center which resulted in the murder of Abdullah Khan by prince Ghazan Khan, the elder son of Mir Shah Ghazanfar with support from a group of killers from Altit and Karimabad. Ghazan Khan later murdered his father Mir Shah Ghazanfar also and became the Mir of Hunza.

Abdullah Khan had five children including one daughter and four sons. The daughter named Mirona was the eldest amongst all and was married in his father's lifetime in Siriqol. Amongst his sons the eldest was Ali Parast who was married to Princes Bi Bi Aftab, the daughter of Mir Shah Ghazanfar, and was given Jagir in Hyderabad Hunza by Mir Shah Ghazafar however later during Ghazan Khan II's period migrated to Passu, others were Muhammad Bari, Ali Fatah, and Abdullah Beg. Muhammad Bari migrated to China with Mir Safdar Khan during the British invasion of Hunza in 1891. Ali Fatah was settled in Ghulkin and Abdullah Baig in Chapursan.

After the death of Mir Shah Salim Khan who was the first-ever Ismaili in Hunza, Shah Ghazanfar and Abdullah Khan was amongst the few people in Hunza who got exposure to the Ismaili faith and became Ismaili during the first half of the 1800s. Mir Shah Salim Khan accepted the Ismaili faith as a result of the discussions with an Ismaili missionary Said Shah Ardabil during his visit to Gulmit. Mir Shah Salim was the first person in Hunza whose funeral was performed as per the Ismaili Tariqah and Chiragh-i-Roshan was performed for the first time in the history of Hunza for him in Gulmit.

In the later part of the 1800s, a major landslide near Sarat village blocked river Hunza and in three years' time, a major lake was formed which inundated major parts of the villages of Gulmit, Hussaini, and Passu. A major portion of the fertile land and orchards came under the lake. Most recently on 4 January 2010, another major landslide occurred in the same area in Atta Abad village which again inundated parts of Shiskat, Ayeenabad, and Gulmit.

=== Shimshal ===
Shimshal valley is the most prominent village among all the valleys of Gojal. It lies at an altitude of 3,100 m (10,170.6 ft) above sea level and is the highest settlement in the district. It is the largest valley in Gilgit-Baltistan and it covers almost area of Hunza District. Shimshal is a border village that connects the Gilgit-Baltistan area of Pakistan with China. The total area of Shimshal is approximately 3,800 km^{2} and there are around 2000 inhabitants with a total of 250 households.

Shimshal valley along Hispar has its largest adventure area in Hunza and is a major attraction for tourists. Distaghil Sar is the highest mountain in the Shimshal Valley, part of the Karakoram mountain range in Gilgit-Baltistan, Pakistan. It is the 19th-highest mountain on Earth and the 7th-highest in Pakistan. Disteghil sar is a Wakhi language word suggested by the Wakhi people of Shimshal, meaning "above the inner ranch." Shimshalis are to Pakistan as Sherpas are to Nepal. More than thirty well known mountaineers from this valley have made Pakistan proud in the field of tourism. Some people call it " The Valley of Mountaineers". Its mountains like Distaghil Sar (7,885 m), Kunjut Sar (7,790 m), Trivor (7,577 m), Pumari Chhish (W) (7,492 m), Yukshin Gardan Sar (7,530 m), Momhil Sar (7,343 m), Malungutti Sar (7,207 m) Shimshal Whitehorn (6,303 m) Minglik Sar (6,150 m), Lupghar Sar (7,200 m), Dut Sar (6,858 m), Sonia Peak (6,310 m), Purian Sar (6,293 m), Yazghail Sar (6,000 m), Yawash Sar II (6176 m) and others are well known among mountaineers. Gigantic glaciers include Malangudhi, Yazghail, Khurdopin (5,800 m), Braldu, Odver, Ver Zharav, and main passes are Chafchingoal, Khurdopin, Mai Dur, Braldu, Boi Sam and others, among which the Khurdopin glacier pass remains the most favorite destination for trekkers.

=== Shishkat ===
Shishkat is also known as Nazimabad Shishkat is the first village of Gojal valley which borders Gojal(upper Hunza) with central Hunza. The total population of the village is 2,160 individuals living within 220 households. This is dominantly a Burushaski-speaking village. However, a sizable population of Wakhi and Domaaki speakers also live in the village. The village was settled down in 1903 during the reign of Mir Nazim Khan. Before this, the barren lands were used as grazing land of the Gulmit village. Some Wakhi households from Gulmit also permanently settled down in Shishkat while the Burushaski and Domaaki people migrated from Central Hunza. The village also has historical significance because this was the battleground between the Wakhi population above Gulmit and the state of Nagar and Hunza.

=== Gulmit - The Sub-Division Headquarters ===
Gulmit is the administrative headquarters of the Gojal Sub-Division. Gulmit is a centuries-old historic town, with mountains, peaks and glaciers. It is a tourist spot and has many hotels, shops and a museum. It is located 2,408 meters (7,900 feet) above the sea level. Gulmit consists of small hamlets called Kamaris, Odver, Dalgiram, Laksh, Kalha, Shawaran, Khor Lakhsh, Chamangul, and Goze. Gulmit is home to around 4,000 people, all of them Wakhi-speakers and followers of the Ismaili school of thought of Shia Islam.

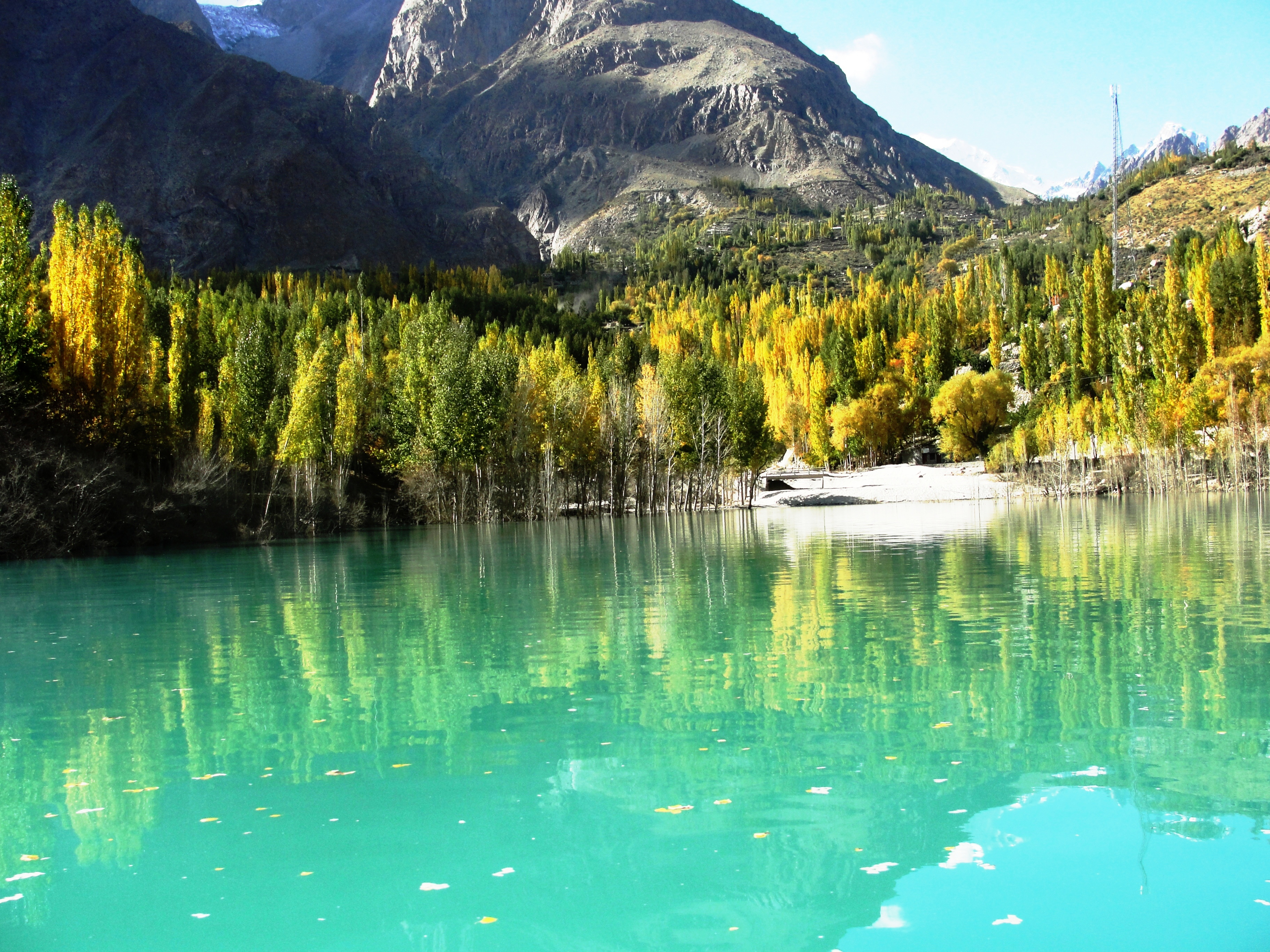
Gulmit in autumn

Before 1974, when Hunza was a state, Gulmit used to be the Summer Capital of the state. After the abolition of the state it became the Tehsil's seat of government. The oldest intact house in Gulmit is more than six centuries old.

There are six Jama'at Khanas or religious community centers in Gulmit. One notices their presence in every ward of the village. The old Summer Palace of Mir of Hunza stands at the northern edge of Gulmit's historic Polo Ground. Old mosques, now used as libraries, also adorn the beautiful physique of Gulmit valley.

Among new buildings constructed by the government in Gulmit are Tehsil Headquarters, Federal Government's Boys High School, Civil Hospital, Diamond Jubilee Girls Middle School, and Government Girls Higher Secondary School.

Al- Amyn Model School, a community-based organization, has a beautiful building standing next to the Health Center of Aga Khan Health Services.

=== Settlement of Passu ===
Passu is located at 125 km from Gilgit on the KKH near the border of China and is surrounded by the mountains of the Karakoram range. Its neighborhood also includes two large glaciers: Batura and Passu Glacier. It is one of the most dangerous places to live in due to the continuous threat of floods and has been flooded four times in the past. Passu is also one of the most ancient villages in the area. According to archeologists, the first human settlement in the area dates back to 3000 BC or 5000 BC. There are many ancient rock carvings of ibex and zebra on several rocks, showing that ibexes have been around in the valley for many millennia, but the area no longer houses zebras. Other wildlife animals here are snow leopards and yaks. In the second settlement era, Chinese Buddhists lived here. The Buddhists of Gandhara, Swat, Gilgit, and Passu traveled from via this valley to go to China. Records of this settlement and subsequent migration are found in Karga Gilgit and Khurramabad Passu. The third settlement in the history of this valley is the Islamic era. Islam came to this area in the ninth century when Muslim soldiers and traders ventured to the region. Quranic verses were etched in the mountains around the valley during this era.

The fourth era was also Islamic, which was settled here in the 18th century. This time, the area boasted a vibrant populace of 315 families. However, this village was destroyed by a natural disaster with a landslide and the nearby river was blocked. Only a few families remained safe by the landslide. This village was destroyed once again in 1964 when the population was forced into migration by the flooding of the Shimshal River and erosion around the river bank. This time around too, the village had some 300 houses. The majority of Passu's native population recognizes its ancestor as a man named Qul Muhammad (famously known as Quli), who had come from Wakhan in the 15th century. In his memory, majority of the people of Passu are also known as Quli-Kutor or Kulikutz. The Quli tribe has also inhabited Karimabad, Murtazabad and many other villages of central Hunza. The Quli-Kuts in central Hunza later adopted the Burusho way of life and now speak the Burushaski language. Most of the families migrated to Chapursan and Khyber.

Among the current inhabitants of Passu are seven families: the Chuway, Magh, Din-Ali, Mohammad Sakhi, Quba, and Parasti or Miron. Parasti are decedent's of Shah Abdullah Khan son of Mir Shah Salim Khan of Hunza. The family is named after Ali Parast, the elder son of Shah Abdullah Khan, who moved to Passu from Shahabad Hyderabad in the 1870s. During Mir Shah Ghazanfar's time, Abdullah Khan was deputed as the governor of Gojal and commander in chief of the forces of Hunza to protect the northern frontiers.

In 1941, the people of Passu, Hussaini and other villages of upper Gojal under the leadership of Muhammad Adab Khan famous as Mahmmad Adob, son of Ali Parast mobilized a revolt against the heavy taxes imposed by Mir Ghazan Khan II on the people of Gojal and threatened the Mir to join the Bolshavik (Russia) and started marching towards the Afghan/Chinese border. His close comrades were Muhammad Hayat, Majnoon bhai, Ibadat Shah, Gul Murad, Bimal Khan, Muhammad Arif and others. The British government of India British Raj intervened and through the local administration of the Gilgit Agency, the issue was resolved by reducing the taxes to the minimum level.

The latest figures put the population of Passu around 1,000.

=== Ghulkin ===
Ghulkin Village is located in Gojal Hunza. It is reached by following the Karakoram Highway (KKH)

140 km north of Gilgit. This trip takes 3–4 hours by road. From a turn-off just beyond Gulmit, a winding road leads upwards for 3 km, until the ground, flattens out and the first houses of the village come into view.

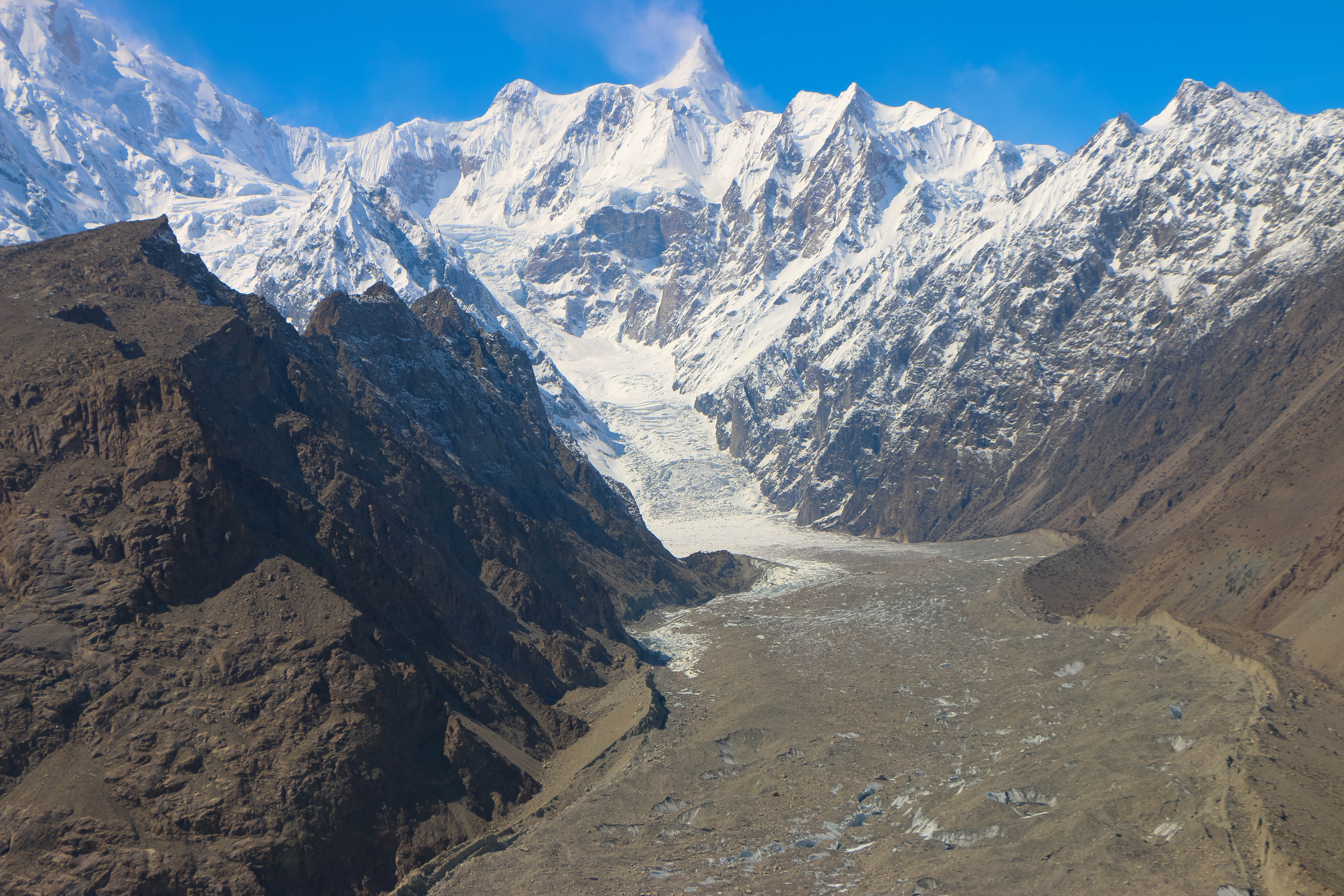
Ghulkin Glacier

Ghulkin occupies the site of an old glacier-fed lake, which has been silted up by continuous sedimentation. Many of the 140 traditional dwellings that constitute Ghulkin village are arranged in a circular form, facing the one-time shores of the lake, creating a wonderfully communal atmosphere. The central area now supports several dwellings and fields, including a strip of land often used as a cricket pitch.

There is no accurate historical record of the origin of the village, though it is estimated to be around 700 years old. According to local folklore, there were settlements here while the lake was still in existence, this area being used as pastureland in summer. The name is derived from two words of the local Wakhi dialect, 'Ghulk', meaning 'well' and 'kin', meaning 'whose'. Being an area of low rainfall, the most vital requirement is water for irrigation, livestock, drinking, and domestic use. Khawaja Ahmed, and Ismaili Muslims who came here with the Mir of Hunza, asked him for land. After the Mir agreed, Khawaja Ahmed mobilized the people of the area to construct a water channel to irrigate the land. This made cultivation possible and the Ismaili settlement flourished. Now small scale health and educational institutions, electricity and water-sully facilities are available in the village. Through the involvement of capacity-building NGOs, there is also a handicraft production center and opportunities for other vocational training.

The Jama'at Khana, the central religious institution for all Ismaili Muslims, holds a strong position in the community. Apart from its religious functions, it provides a central location for community meetings, festivals, celebrations, resolution of disputes, and other community activities. In Upper Hunza, winters are long and can become bitterly cold. Snowfall brings with it the Siberian ibex, descending in search of grass under the snow cover. Summers are hot in the north, though more pleasant than the harsh temperatures in summer are around 30 °C. In winter the temperature remains below freezing point, further dropping at night.

=== Hussaini ===
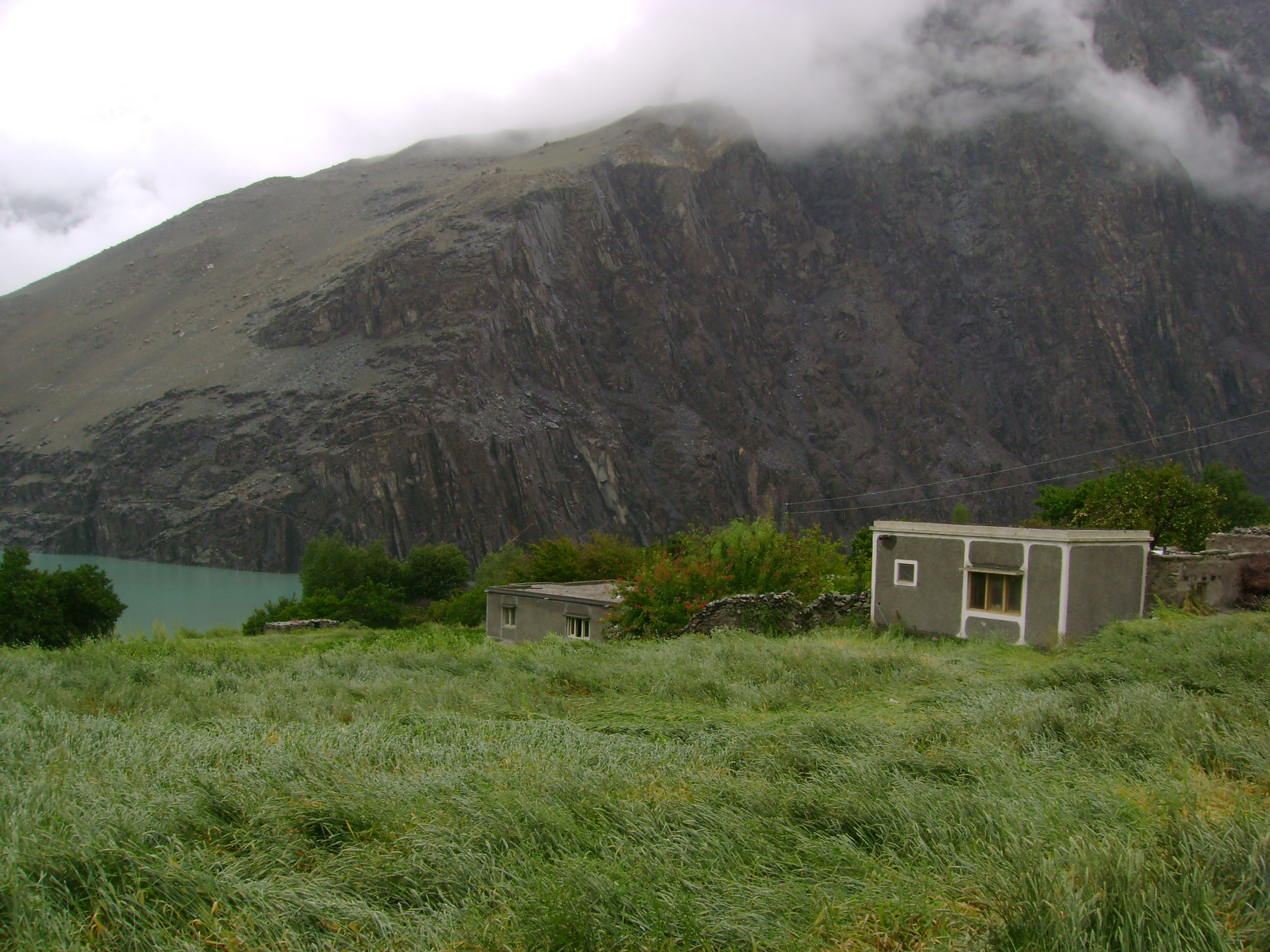
Hussaini village on Attabad Lake

Hussaini village is one of the old settlements of the Wakhi people in the Gojal valley. Hussaini is surrounded by the Hussaini Glacier and the Khunjarav River and the Karakoram Highway passes through the middle of the village.

People: The residents of Hussaini are ethnically Wakhi and speak Xikwor or Wakhi language. Most of the residents are from the Wakhan, Putuxk village of Musofer Family and a few are from Passu known as Quli or Sakhi Ktur.

Religion: The people of Hussaini like all other people in Gojal are followers of the Ismaili school of thought in Islam.

Tourist attractions: Hussaini Suspension Bridge, Hussaini Glacier, Zarabod Track and Sultan e Shahtalib (decades-old shrine of a saint) are famous tourist attractions of the Hussaini village of Gojal valley.

=== Avgarch ===
One of the oldest settlement and stronghold of the Wakhis against the foreign invaders like Kirghiz, Shighnanis is located in a narrow valley starting at Murkhun village at [KKH] and reaches height of Qarun pass. The Wakhis used to live in fortified houses, two forts, namely Pasth Qlha and Wuch-Qlha are still in partial use. An old Ismaili mosque, a new Jamat Khana, old Watchtowers in Avgarch and Boibar are some of the major landmarks in the valley. Baba Sufi is considered one of the first men to settle in Gojal along with his son Quba and his wife Jaa. They settled by the springs of Gircha but abandoned it due to the agitation of looters, his clan along with other Wakhi settlers later kept using Gircha as fertile land and took the crops back to Avgarch. Later Mir Silum Khan of Hunza convinced the people to permanently abode Gircha and Avgarch was used for winters, this trend of migration in session is still in practice. During the invasion of the British, the people from all lower Gojal and Hunza took shelter in Avgarch. Later British-backed troops came to Avgarch and asked people to go back to their homes with assured safety.

Avgarch is a tourist attraction with a 1.5-hour hike from the KKH. It offers beautiful pastures and hamlets, glaciers and peaks, Yosinband, Old graves of Kirghiz, the oldest Juniper tree of Hunza the Baltar Yarz, Boibar valley, Priyar and the famous Qorun pass. Exotic animals like snow leopards, Himalayan ibex, Golden eagle and many more are major attractions. Avgarch is famous for its trophy hunting, the hunting sessions starts in winters and managed and facilitated by Khunjerab villagers Organization.

=== Gircha ===
A spring village, by the KKH is one of the first settled lands in Gojal and Hunza. Settled by Wakhi legend Bobo e Sufi, his generation used this land just to grow crops for long, then a fort was built in Gircha which became the center of political activities for Mirs, Sarai for travelers/explorers and Ismaili Missionaries from central Asia and South Asia to China. Gircha has a geographical significance as there are proofs that provide unique litho- and biofacies which has led to the term Gircha has been flooded multiple times. Fossils and woods can be seen in the sediments of cliffs made visible by recent erosions.

A flood from Dilboy stopped the Khunjerav River which eroded the old village and fort. People relocated the fort but the erosion continued and people had settle new villages nearby, namely; Sost, Nazimabad, Moorkhun, Jamalabad and Ghalapan.

Residents include the Bobo Sufi clan, further divided into Rumi Kutor, Posh Kutor, and Arbob Kutor, some Wakhi later inhabited the place and are called Khik Kutor, in an era of Mir Nazim Burushaski families were also gifted lands in Gircha.

Gircha remains a center of interest for visitors around the world, there are various springs which run the activities of the village, fossils, corals, sea shells, oldest mosque and first school of the region, historic houses, and traditional irrigation channels are major mentions. The village is self-sufficient due to its own electric powerhouse, traditional watermill, women run handicrafts vocational center, the first and only veterinary, spring water trout fish farm, a dispensary and well equipped library.

=== Sost ===
Sost is the last border town of Pakistan which leads the KKH to China through Khunjerab. Sost is the center of activities in upper Gojal with the office of Assistant Magistrate, an established bazaar, a dry port, customs, and other official setups. Sost is also an old village, with a diverse population. An old house related to Bobo e Sufi is visitable, a Shrine of Saint Baba Sheikh Farid, brother of Shah Shams and Shah Talib is a place of interest for visitors.

In 1985 a long tunnel was dug by locals with the supervision of Aga Khan Rural Support ProgrammePakistan to irrigate the pasture of Sost, which was named Hussainabad. Sost comprises four settlements known as Nazimabad, Center Sost, Afiyatabad (Known as Sost Bazar), and Hussainabad.

=== Nazimabad ===
Nazimabad is a village in Sost settled in 1910. The initial settlement started with the orders of Mir of Hunza, Mir Nazim Khan and hence the name Nazimabad emerged. This village is a diverse population of nearly 800 inhabitants including Burushaski and Wakhi speakers.

=== Chapursan ===
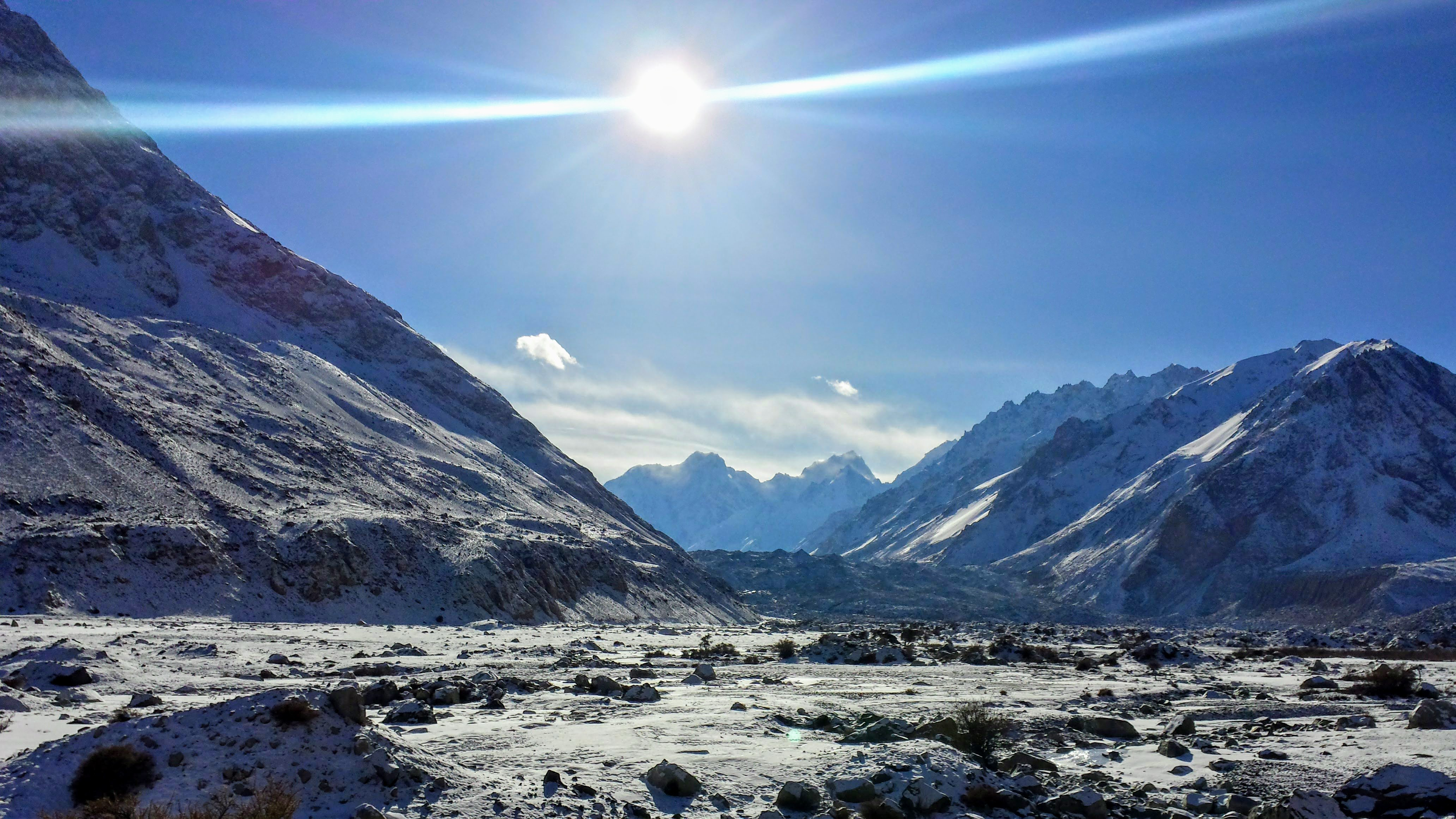
A view of Yishkuk and Pomeeri side, covered with a white blanket of snow. Picture taken in an afternoon winter sun rising above the Pomeeri mountains of Chipurson Valley.

(Wakhi: چپورسن; also spelt Chipurson, Chipurson, Chaporsan, Chupurson) is a valley containing some eight scattered villages within the Hunza District of Gilgit-Baltistan, Pakistan. It is the most Northern part of Pakistan, bordering Afghanistan and China. The majority of the people in the valley speak the Wakhi Language, but the villagers of Raminj speak the Burushaski language and belong to the Ismaili sect of Islam. Chipurson Valley hosts over 500 households with a population of 3,000.

== Geography ==
Geographically, Gojal (Upper Hunza) covers a vast mountainous area, with valley floors starting at an elevation of approximately 2,438m (7,999 ft) above sea level. It forms the western part of the Karakoram and Eastern Pamir mountain ranges. The area also contains the 57 km long Batura Glacier, which is one of the longest glaciers outside the polar regions. The region's landscape is heavily characterized by ice-capped peaks, rivers, alpine pastures, and glacial formations.

== Settlements ==
- Afiyatabad
- Ainabad
- Avgarch (Obgarch)
- Boibar
- Chaman Gul
- Ghlapan
- Ghulkin
- Gircha
- Gulmit
- Hussainabad
- Husseini
- Jamalabad
- Khudabad
- Khyber
- Misgar
- Morkhun
- Nazimabad
- Passu
- Sartiz
- Shimshal
- Shishkat
- Sust
- Zarabad

== Administration ==
Gulmit serves as the tehsil headquarters and was historically the winter capital of the Hunza state until 1974. Sost functions as the primary border customs post and gateway for overland trade between Pakistan and China. Administrative oversight for the region is managed from Gilgit, while local law enforcement is maintained by a magistrate and two police stations.

== Poets ==
Upper Hunza is home to some reowned poets. Among the poets are Nazir Ahmad Bulbul, Saif Uddin Saif, Rehmat Ullah Mushfiq, Afzal Karim, and many more. Most of these poets write in the Wakhi language.

== Tourist sites ==
=== Shishkat ===
Shishkat is the first village in Gojal valley, coming from the South. The Attabad lake, also known as Gojal Lake, is also located in Shishat and Gulmit village. Attabad Lake came into being after the village of Attabad was destroyed by a massive landslide on 4 January 2010. The landslide blocked the Hunza River gorge and formed a lake which, at its peak, stretched from the Attabad barrier to Passu, almost 24 kilometers long. The people of Shishkat are also known for their hospitality.

Lupghar Sar is 109th on the list of world tallest mountains. It is located in Shimshal valley. It is part of the Momhail Sar cluster of mountains and has an elevation of 7,200 meters (23,622 ft) above sea level. In the Wakhi language, Lupghar Sar translates as "the top of the big rock".

== See also ==
- Hunza Valley
- Chipursan
- Shimshal
- Khunjerab National Park
- Wakhi language
- Burusho people
