= Patrame =

- Village
- Location in Karnataka, India Patrame (India)
- Coordinates: 12°52′53″N 075°22′22″E
- Country: India
- State: Karnataka
- District: Dakshina Kannada

Government
  - Body: Village panchayat

Population (2011)
  - Total: 2,428

Languages
  - Official: Kannada
- Time zone: UTC+5:30 (IST)
- PIN: 574198
- Vehicle registration: KA-21
- Lok Sabha constituency: Dakshina Kannada
- Vidhana Sabha constituency: Belthangady
- Gender ratio: 1007:1000 ♀/♂

Patrame is a small, rural panchayat village on the left (east) bank of the Netravati River in Karnataka, India. Administratively, it is under Belthangady taluk, Dakshina Kannada district, Karnataka. Patrame is the only village in its gram panchayat. The village of Patrame is 26 km from its taluk headquarters Belthangady, and 8 km by road from Dharmasthala.

== Demographics ==
As of 2001 India census, Patrame had 2,178 inhabitants, with 1,085 males (49.8%) and 1,093 females (50.2%), for a gender ratio of 1007 females per thousand males.

In the 2011 census, the village of Patrame had 2,428 inhabitants recorded.

== Languages ==
- Tulu
- Kannada
- Beary dialect

== Education ==
The schools in Patrame village include

- Govt. Primary school, Patrame.
- Govt. Primary school, Suryattaavu, Patrame.
- Govt. Primary school, Anaaru, Patrame.
- Sri Rama primary school and high school, Pattooru, Patrame. (Formerly, Sri Vishnumoorthi Aided Higher Primary school)
- Govt. Primary school, Badipalike, Patrame.

The medium of instruction in all the above schools is Kannada.

== Revenue ==
The main source of income to the people living here is agriculture. Arecanut being the main crop is grown in most farms with scattered plantations of coconut, paddy, pepper, banana, vanilla, etc.

== Tourist spots around Patrame ==
- River Kapila. (Starts at Western ghats, flows through Shishila and reaches Patrame)
- Netravati River
- Southadka - 6 km from Patrame.
- Shri Mahavishnumoorthi temple, Patrame
- Anaaru Durgaaparameshwari temple.
- Dharmasthala - 8 km from Patrame.
- Vaidyanatheshwara temple, Kokkada - Has a beautiful pond in the vicinity. (8 km from Patrame)
- Jamalabad Fort - 32 km from Patrame.
- Shishileshwara temple, Shishila - 27 km from Patrame.

== See also ==
- Belthangady Taluk
- Dakshina Kannada District
- Mangalore
