= Attabad =

Place in Gilgit-Baltistan, Pakistan

Attabad عطا آباد
- Town
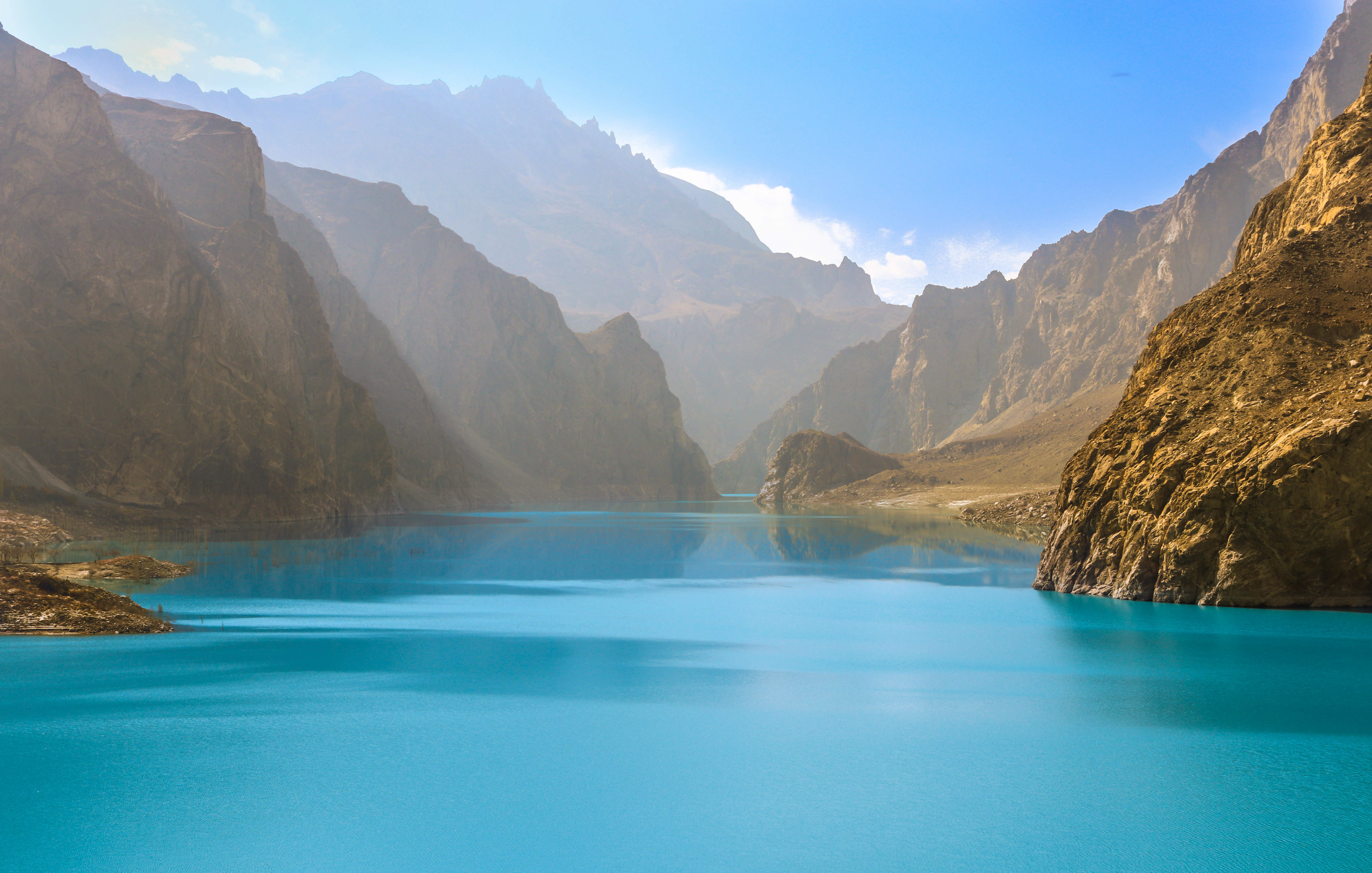
- Attabad Lake in 2016. The lake formed after a landslide in January 2010 blocked the Hunza river

- Location within Gilgit Baltistan Location within Pakistan
- Coordinates: 36.19°N 74.48°E
- Country: Pakistan
- Adm. Unit: Gilgit-Baltistan
- Division: Gilgit Division
- District: Nagar District
- Time zone: UTC+5:00 (PKT)

Attabad (Urdu: عطا آباد), also spelled Atabad, is a town in Gilgit-Baltistan, Pakistan. It lies at 36°19'0"N 74°48'0"E, at an altitude of 2,559 metres (8,396 ft) and is best known as the location of the Attabad Lake, which formed in January 2010 following a major landslide, which blocked the flow of the Hunza River for several months.

== See also ==
- Attabad Lake
