= Misgar, Hunza =

Misgar مسگر
- Village / Valley
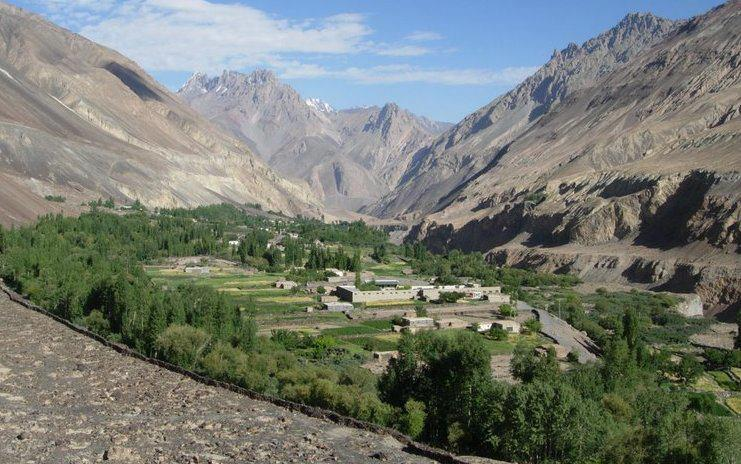

- Location in Pakistan Misgar (Pakistan)
- Coordinates: 36.7875°N 74.7667°E
- Country: Pakistan
- Autonomous state: Gilgit-Baltistan
- Division: Gilgit
- District: Hunza

Population
  - Total: 1,227

Languages
  - Local: Burushaski
- Time zone: PST

Misgar (Urdu: مسگر) is both a village and a valley located in the northernmost region of Pakistan Administered Kashmir. It lies on the northern edge of the Hunza District within Gilgit-Baltistan, where Pakistan shares its borders with China, Tajikistan and Afghanistan. In recent years, Misgar has gained prominence as a starting point for a captivating trek to two Silk Road passes: Kilik Pass and Mintaka Pass, both of which lead to the Tarim Basin in China.

== History ==
Kilik Pass and Mintaka Pass, located to the north of Misgar, have a deep historical significance as they were integral parts of the ancient Silk Road. These passes served as the customary caravan routes connecting Pakistan and India to Tashkurgan Tashkurgan before the Karakoram Highway was established.

The present-day settlements in the Misgar valley date back to at least 1844. During that period, Misgar was established by people from four different tribes who migrated from Hunza.

British Raj took control of the area in 1892 as part of their efforts during the Great Game. They constructed a fort in Misgar in 1930s to control the Wakhan Corridor—Qalandarchi Fort. It is now a local landmark. Misgar remained part of Hunza until independence of Pakistan in 1947.

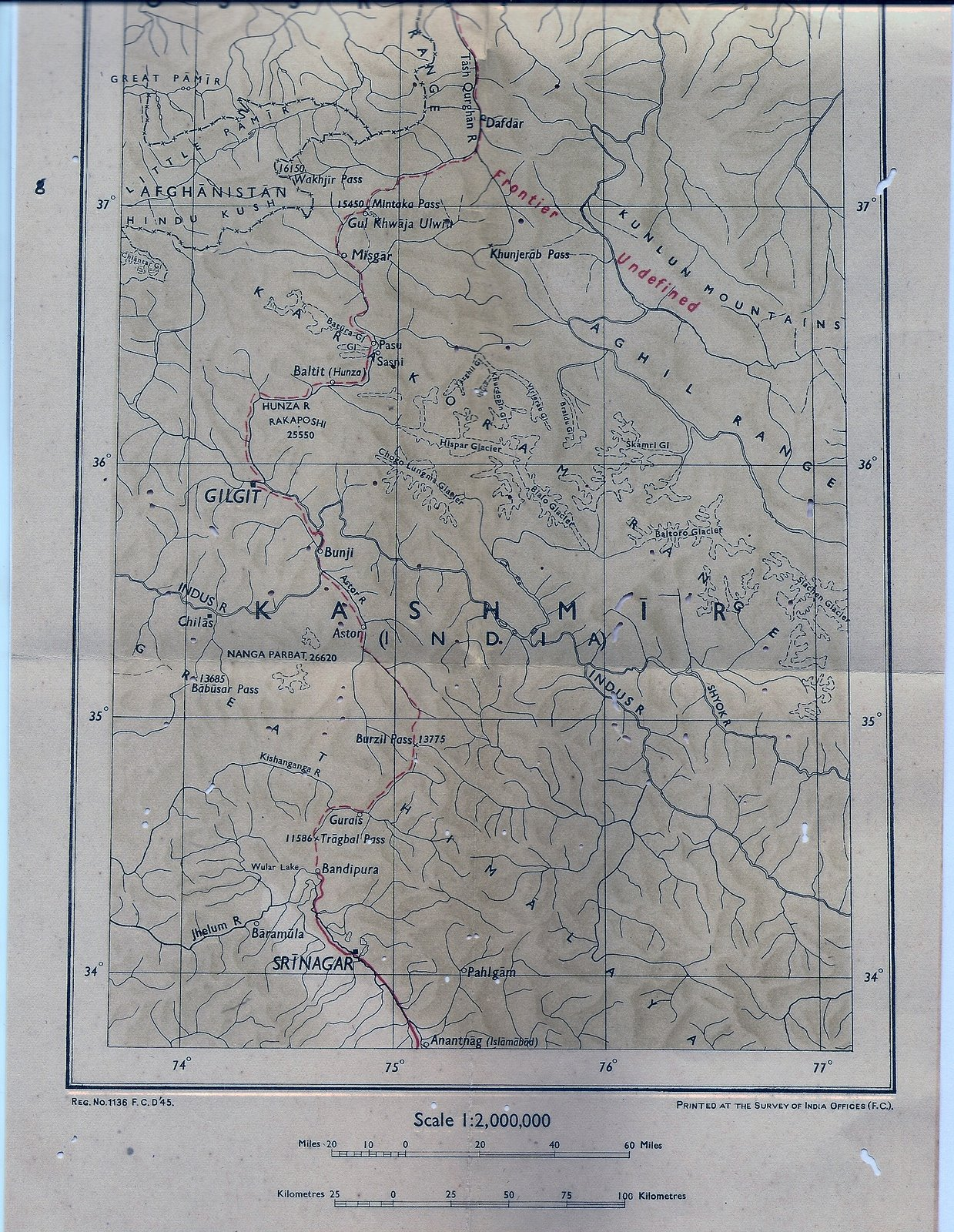
A pre-1947 British Indian map with Misgar on the primary thoroughfare between Kashmir and Tarim Basin

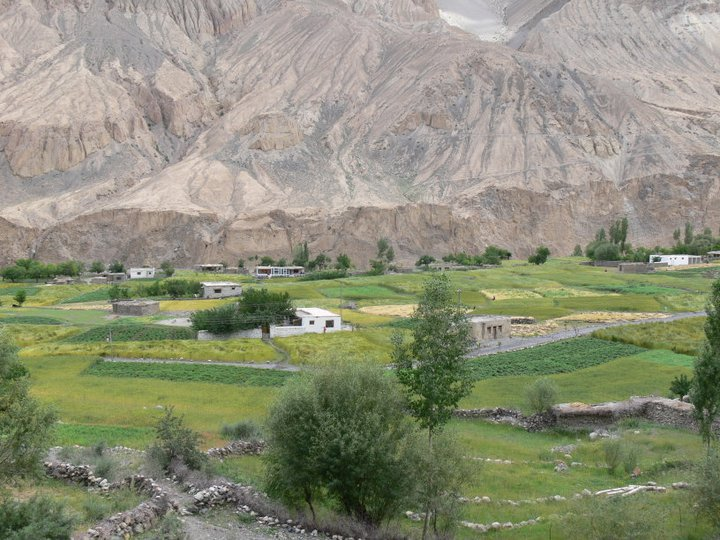
Another angle of the village

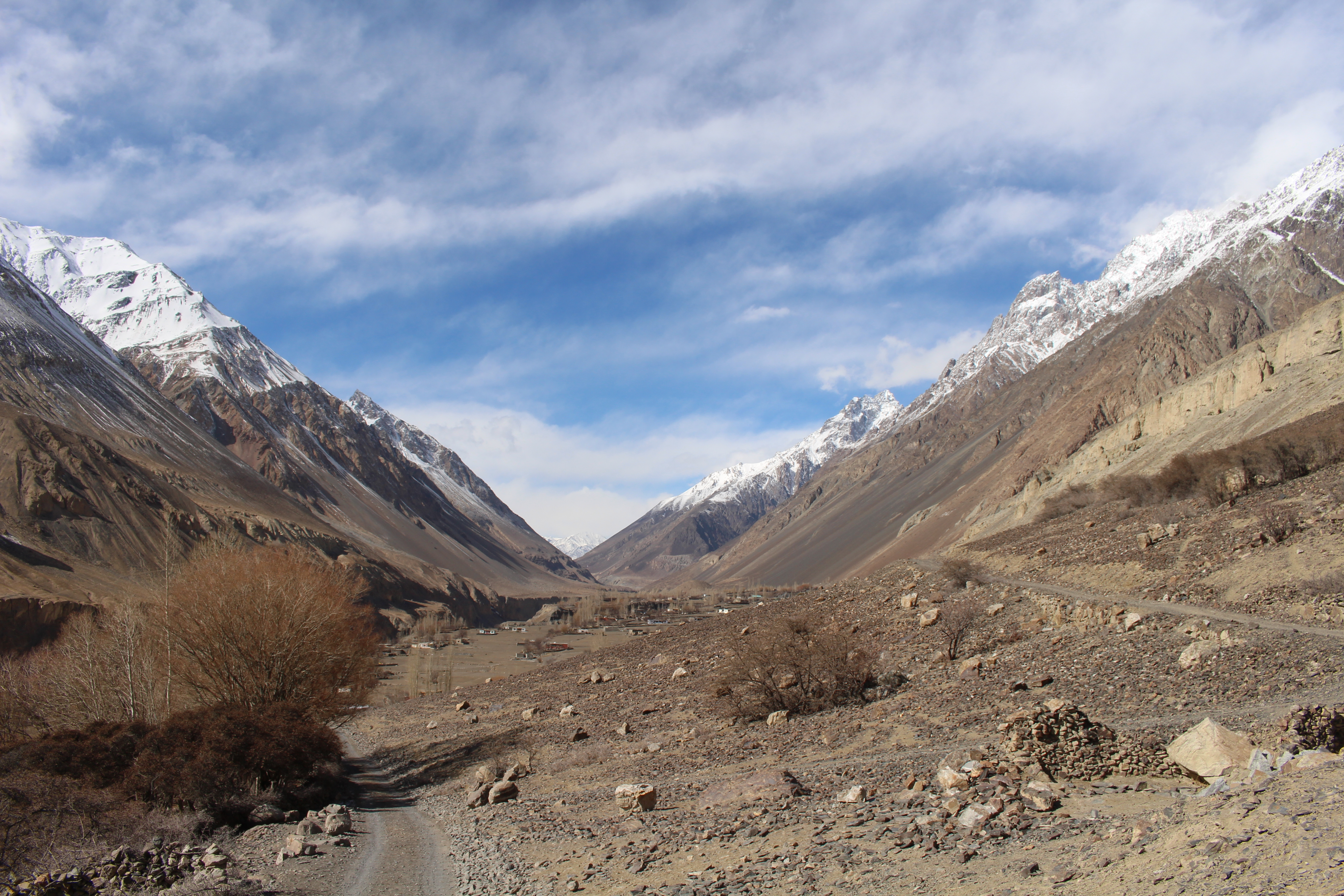
