= Malangutti Sar =

Mountain in Pakistan

- Mulungutti Sar ملنگُتی سر
- Location within Pakistan

Highest point
- Elevation: 7,207 m (23,645 ft); Ranked 103rd
- Prominence: 507 m (1,663 ft)
- Listing: Mountains of Pakistan
- Coordinates: 36°21′48″N 75°08′54″E

Geography
- Location: Shimshal, Hunza, Pakistan
- Parent range: Karakoram

Climbing
- First ascent: 12 August 1985
- Easiest route: snow/ice climb

Malangutti Sar (Urdu: ملنگُتی سر) is a 7,207 metres (23,645 feet) high mountain of the Karakoram range, in Gilgit–Baltistan, Pakistan. The Malangutti Glacier originates on its eastern flank and Momhil Glacier flows along its western flank. It is the 103rd tallest mountain on Earth and located in the Shimshal Valley of the Hunza District of Pakistan.

The first ascent was completed on August 12, 1985 by a Japanese team consisting of Tadao Sugimoto, Kengo Nakahara, Yasushi Muranaka and Ang Nima Sherpa.
