= Zarabod =

Village in Gilgit-Baltistan, Pakistan

Zarabod is a small agricultural hamlet in Gojal (Upper Hunza) in Gilgit-Baltistan, Pakistan. The people of Passu and Hussaini have equally divided it into two parts. The word Zarabad is a combination of the Persian words "Zar" (gold) and "Abod" (cultivated land). The area is an irrigated alluvial fan from glacial melt. It is connected to the nearby village of Hussaini by the 635 ft (194 m) long Hussaini Suspension Bridge.
