= Morkhoon =

Moorkhun Moorkhun
- Moorkhun
- Location within Gilgit Baltistan Location within Pakistan
- Coordinates: 36.613°N 74.865°E
- Country: Pakistan
- Territory: Gilgit Baltistan
- Region Gojal: Hunza Gojal

Moorkhun (also Morkhun and Moorkhun) is a small village on the Karakoram Highway in the Gilgit-Baltistan region of Pakistan. It is across a small river from Boibar valley. The village is beside the Hunza River about 180 kilometres (110 mi) upriver from Gilgit. It is the eighth village from Gulmit towards the China–Pakistan border at the Khunjerab Pass. This village is 5 kilometres (3.1 mi) before the Pakistani port of entry at Sust.

== Geography ==
Moorkhun is surrounded by large mountains. The Boyber Valley link road lies with Karakurum Highway.

Moorkhun village is the gateway to old route to Shimshal village. From Karakoram Highway, the trek to Shimshal follows the Boiber River, leading through Avgarch village, Chilkhun, Boiber, Piryar and Dut pass (river crossing), eventually arrive at Shimshal village. Along this old route are also forks to Qaroon Peak and Jurjur Khoon Sar peak.

== Etymology ==
The name Moorkhun allegedly comes from the Wakhi Language, which is spoken in Badakhshan and Pamir. According to locals, "Moor" translates to "rain" and Khun translates to "house" in Wakhi. Roughly translating to "rain house".

== Population ==
The village has a population of between 600 and 800 people as of 2019. All residents of Moorkhun and the surrounding villages are Wakhi. Most of the people are farmers, belonging from one of the few major tribal families locally known as "Ruum". Some of these major families include the Arbob Kutor, Posh Ruum, Xik Ruum and Mirza Mohammed Kutor. Mirza Mohammed Kutor is the largest of these families.

The population of Moorkhun village is relatively more political than the rest of Gojal.

This village hosts a primary school, middle school and a college for women education. The education system is based on community school system and NGO. Moorkhun is the first village in the Gojal valley, where as the Moorkhun villagers built the very first self-help community middle school. They were the first one in the entire region of Gojal. This school was built entirely on volunteer basis.

== Language ==
All residents of Moorkhun speak Wakhi as their native language. However, it is not uncommon for residents to speak more than five languages, including Urdu, English, Brushaski and sometimes basic Chinese.

Wakhi language is an Indo-European language in the Eastern Iranian branch of the language family. There are about 50,000–58,000 Wakhi-speakers in the world, divided between four countries -- Wakhan District of Afghanistan, Gilgit-Baltistan of Pakistan, Xinjiang of China, and Tajikistan.

== Religion ==
The People are Wakhani or Xik and speak the Wakhi or Xik-wor Language. Religiously they are Muslims.

== Culture ==
=== Cultural preservation ===
In 1990, the Gojali Wakhis of Pakistan established the "Wakhi Tajik Cultural Association", which aimed to preserve, document, and publish their "local culture". The association introduced a script that was applied into linguistic and literary textbooks, and organized cultural festivals. Radio Pakistan's Radio Gilgit also aired a daily Wakhi-language program named a'Bamasasasasas-e Dunya ("Roof of the World").
