= Gircha =

Gircha گلِ گرچہ
- Town
- Gul-e-Gircha
- Location within Gilgit Baltistan
- Coordinates: 36.6486°N 74.8488°E
- Country: Pakistan
- Province: Gilgit–Baltistan
- District: Hunza
- Tehsil: Gojal
- Elevation: 2,832 m (9,291 ft)

Population (2014)
  - Total: more than 470
- Time zone: UTC+5 (PST)
- Climate: BWk

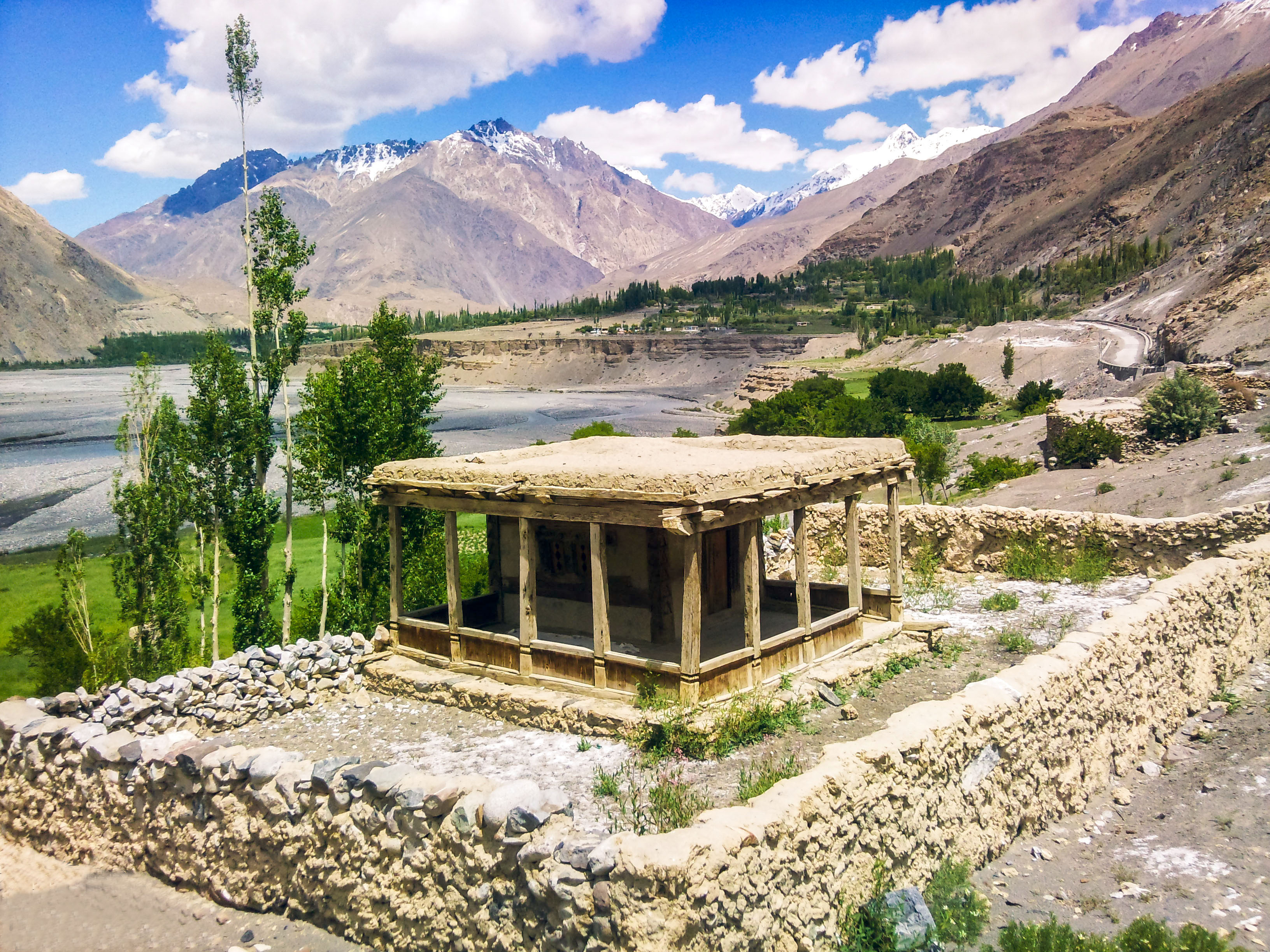
Gircha Bibi Nekbakht Mosque, relocated after erosion

Gircha (Note: Urdu: گرچہ, Urdu pronunciation: [ɡɪɾ.t͡ʃɑː]; Wakhi: گِرچَه, romanized: Girča, [girˈt͡ʃa]) is a village in the Gojal Tehsil of Hunza in the Gilgit Baltistan region of Pakistan. It is one of the oldest Wakhi villages of upper Gojal Hunza, settled by Bobo e Sufi, who was the first man to settle in the region and the ancestor of present wakhis.

== Etymology ==
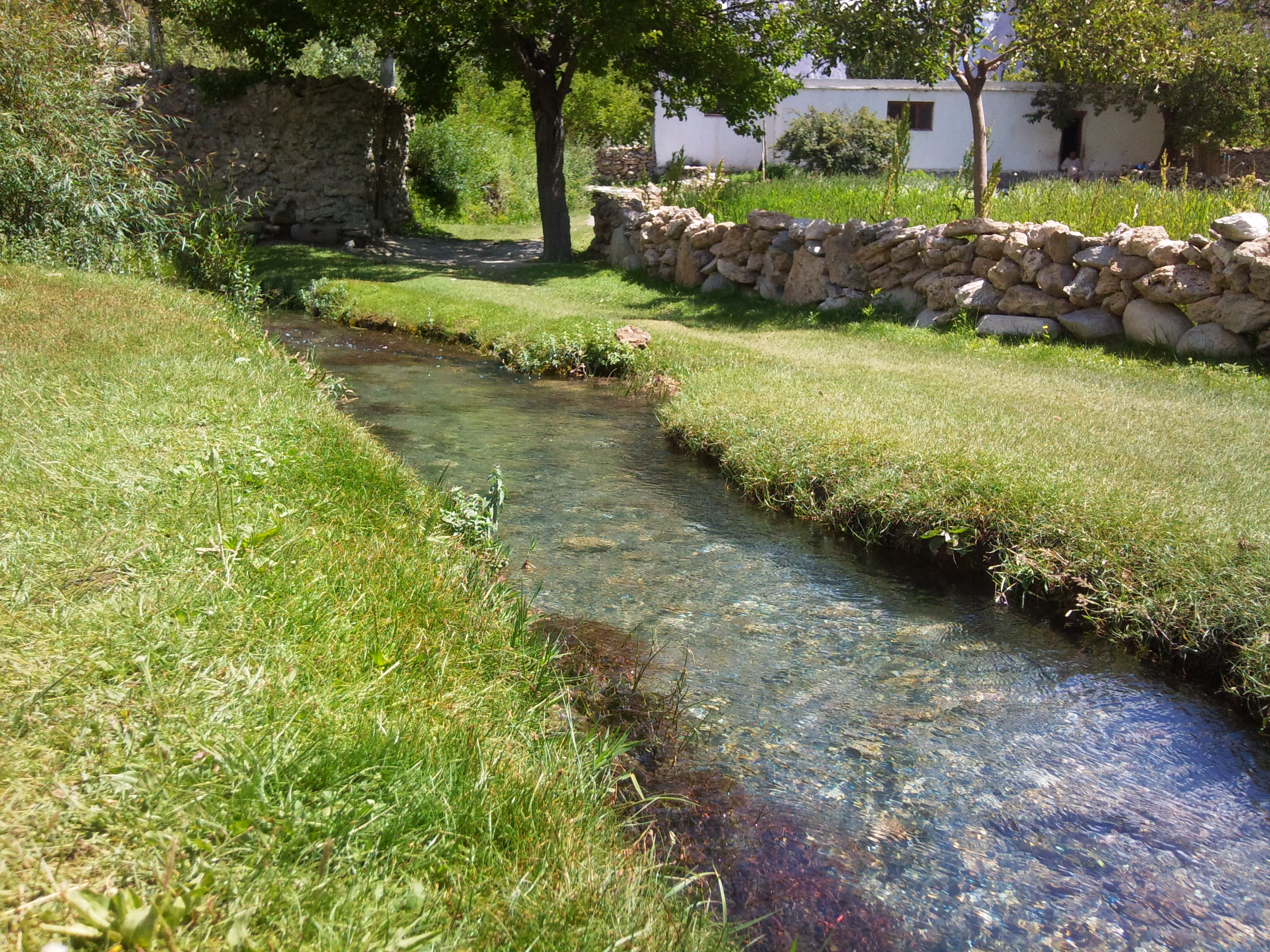

The word "Gircha" is considered to come from Grich which means a hut near spring water. An alternative theory supposes that Gircha comes from the snail shell/ Kišrif Wakhi or reefs found in Gircha, which are of great archeological interest.

According to numerology, the study of the significance of numbers, one is the life path number for Gircha.

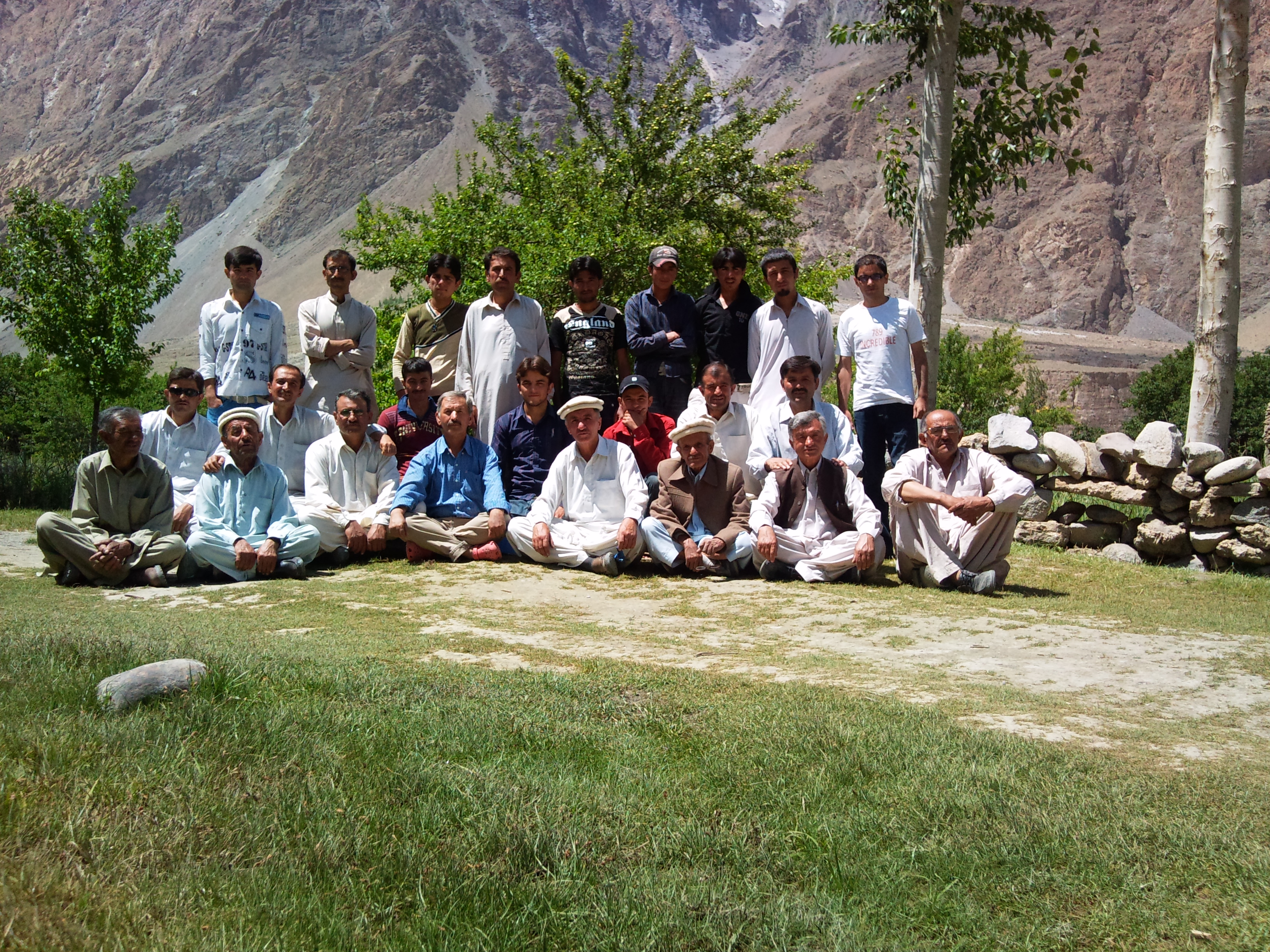
Notable of past Gircha after Chineer
