= Jamalabad =

Hilltop fortification in Karnataka, India

Coordinates: 13°1′37.38″N 75°17′41.02″E

Jamalabad Fort
- Part of Karnataka
- Belthangady, Karnataka, India
- Jamalabad Fort

Site information
- Type: Fort
- Controlled by: Government of Karnataka
- Condition: Ruins

Site history
- Built: 1794
- Built by: Kingdom of Mysore
- Materials: Granite Stones and lime mortar

Airfield information
- Elevation: 320 AMSL

Jamalabad Fort is an old hilltop fortification in Killoor road, Belthangady, Dakshina Kannada District, Karnataka, India. It is located in the Kudremukh range of hills, 8 km north of Beltangady town and 65 km from the city of Mangalore. It is also referred locally as "Jamalabad Fort" or "Gadaikallu".

== History ==
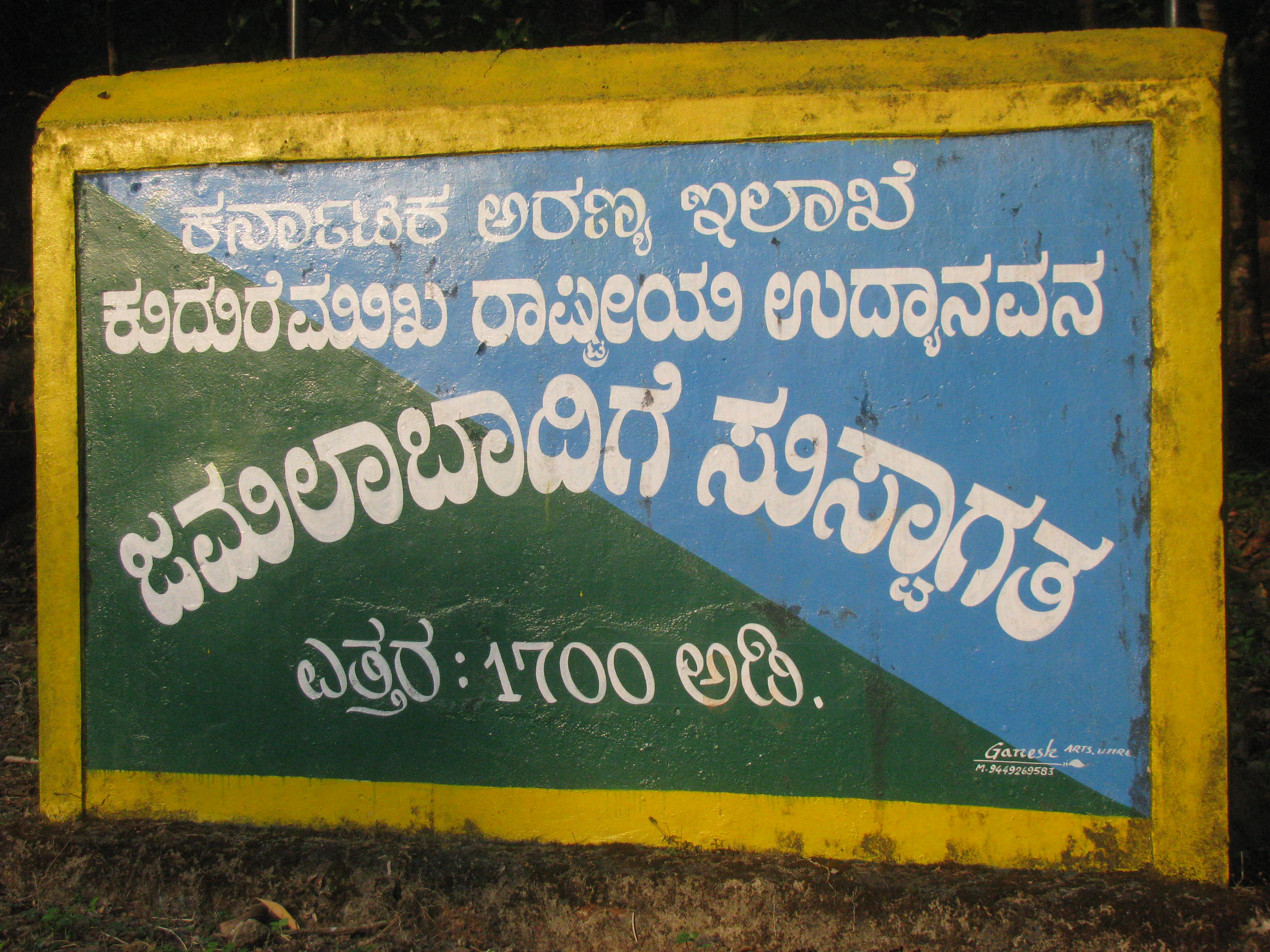
Gadaikallu entrance, Reading: Welcome to Jamlabad, height: 1700 feet

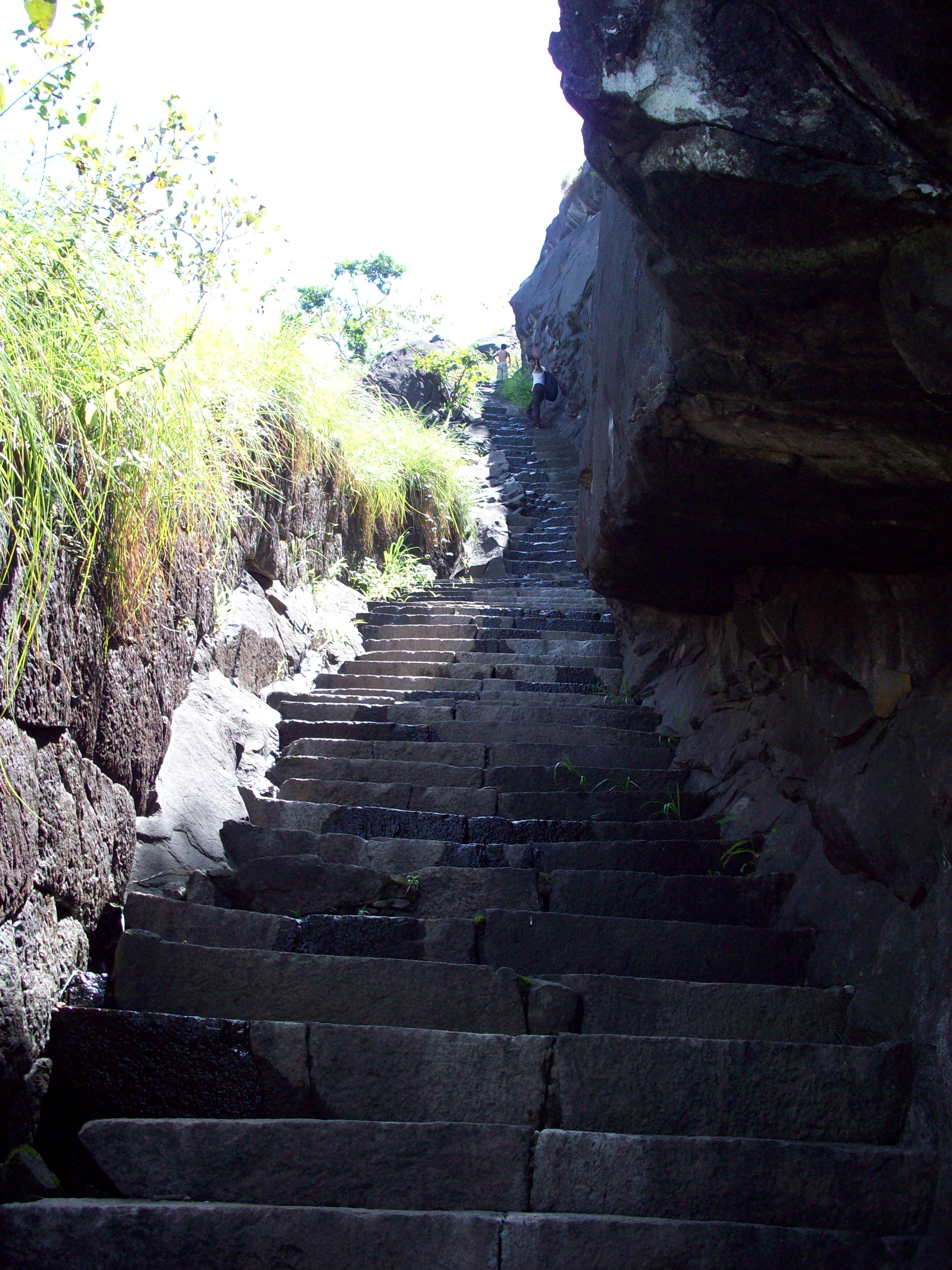
Narrow steps leading to the fort

The fort was built by Tipu Sultan in 1794 and named after his mother, Jamalabee. He decided to build a fort there, as he was impressed by the massive granitic rock which was suitable for the construction of a strong fort. According to locals, it was built to serve as a watch tower to see things around when enemy attacked.there is a lake situated at the top which is used to store water, it's truly mesmerising to watch the sight.

The fort is accessible via a narrow path, with around 1876 steps to the fort that are cut out of the granite hill and lead all the way to the top.

Inside the fort, there is a tank to store rainwater. Remains of a single cannon lie at the top. Nothing much of the fortifications remain but hints of the fort wall with parapets are visible. The fort was captured by the British in 1799 during the 4th Mysore war. Legend has it that those out of favour with Tipu were hurled down the edge to their death.

== Trekking ==
Jamalabad Fort is a trekking destination, with the climb up to the fort being classified as 'medium difficulty level' and the top of the structure offering good views of the surrounding landscape and the Kudremukh range.

At the base of the hill is a forest check post where visitors have to pay a nominal entry fee. Visitors should carry food and plenty of water since there is no potable fresh water available on top. The nearest town with any communication and medical facilities is Beltangady.

Entry to the fort is open between 6 am and 4 pm and overnight stay at the fort is prohibited. This hillock fort has one room at the top.

There is also an unmanned microwave repeater station on top of the hill. Being a hill station it is really cold there and suggested to wear warm and comfortable clothes due to lot of walking.

The peak is 520 m above MSL, while the surrounding area is less than 200 m, meaning the trek is considerably steep.

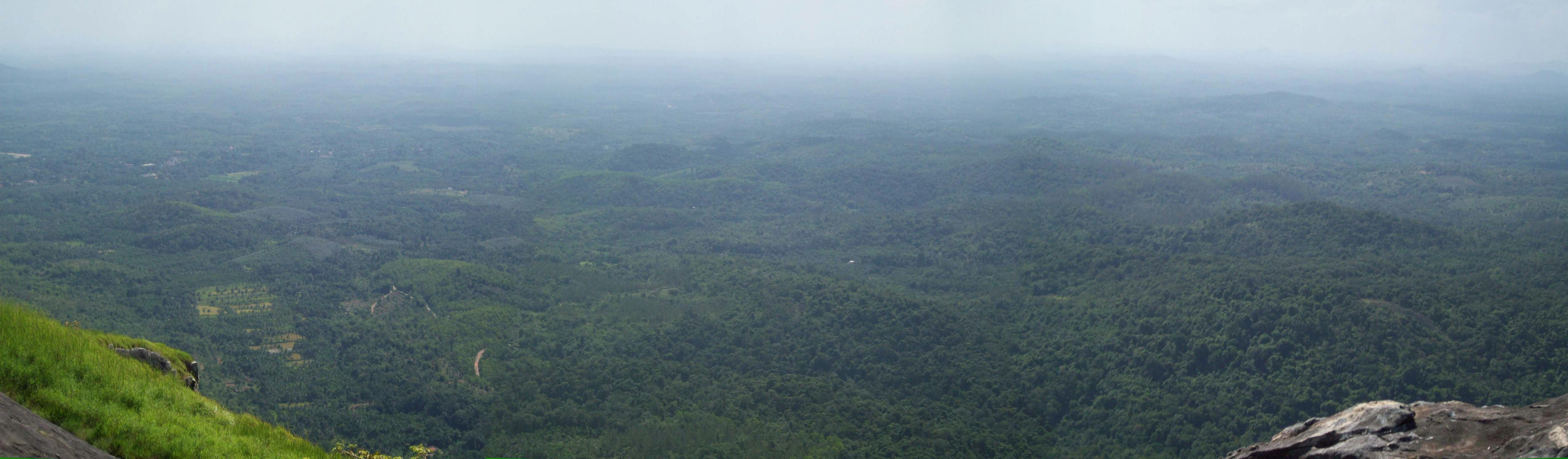
View from top of the hillock

== See also ==
- Patrame
- Dharmasthala
- Southadka
