= Southadka =

Hindu pilgrimage site in Karnataka, India

Southadka is a pilgrimage centre in Dakshina Kannada district in the Indian state of Karnataka. It is located 3 km from Kokkada in Belthangady Taluk.
