= Attabad Lake =

Lake in Hunza Valley, Gilgit-Baltistan

- Gojal Lake
- عطا آباد جھیل (Urdu)
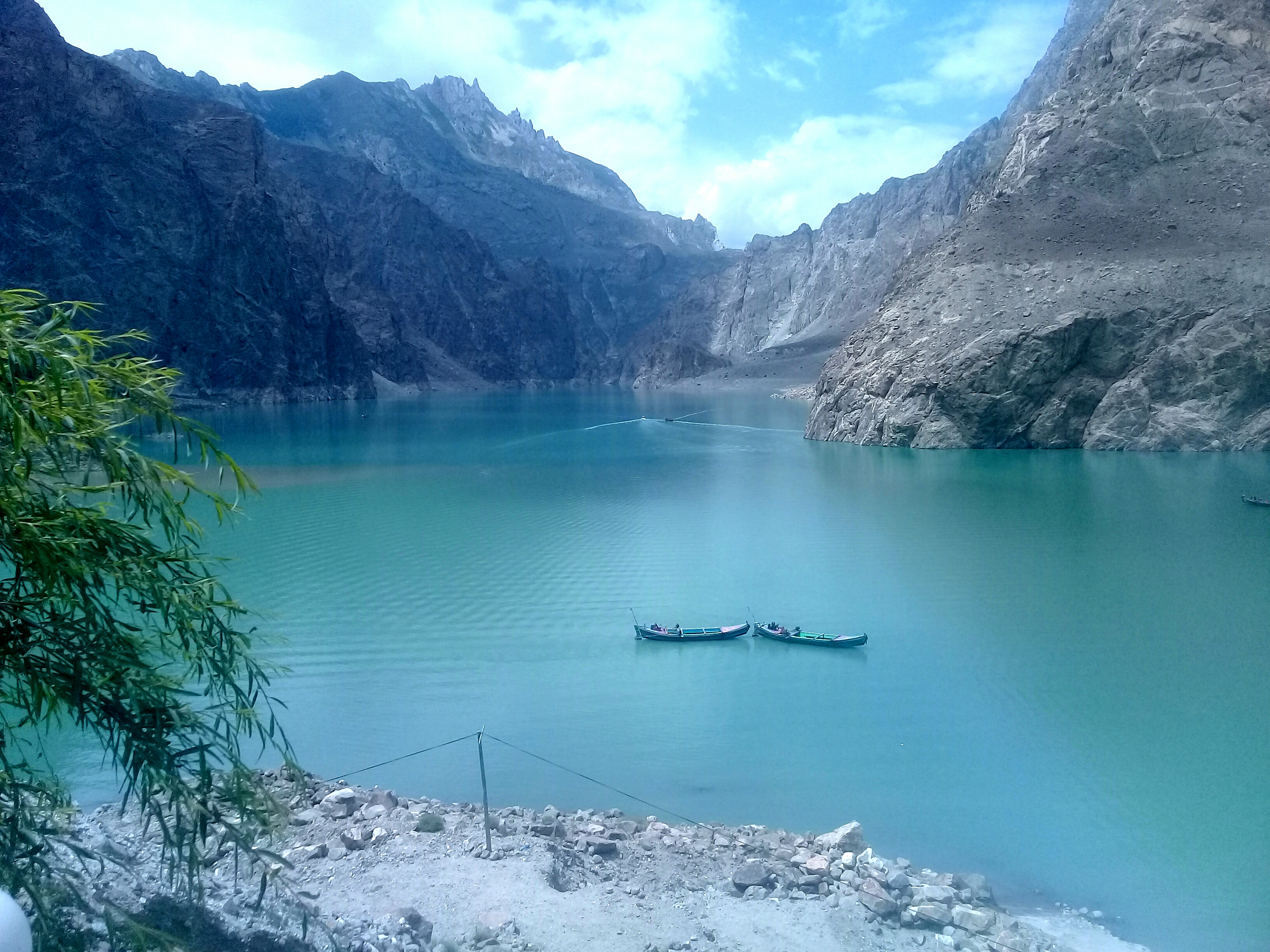
- Attabad Lake in Gojal, July 2017

- Location within Gilgit Baltistan Location within Pakistan
- Interactive map of Attabad Lake
- Location: Gojal, Hunza District, Gilgit-Baltistan, Pakistan
- Coordinates: 36°20′13″N 74°52′3″E
- Etymology: Attabad
- Primary inflows: Hunza River, 79 m^{3}/s (2,800 cu ft/s), 26 May 2010
- Primary outflows: Gojal River overflowing landslide dam, 100 m^{3}/s (3,700 cu ft/s), 4 June 2010
- Max. length: 21 km (13 mi)
- Max. depth: 109 m (358 ft)
- Water volume: 410,000,000 m^{3} (330,000 acre⋅ft), 26 May 2010
- Settlements: Gojal, Hunza Valley

Attabad Lake (Urdu: عطا آباد جھیل), also known as Hunza Lake, is a lake located in the Gojal region of the Pakistani-administered Gilgit-Baltistan. It was formed in January 2010 when a significant landslide impounded the water in the Hunza River in Attabad village. The lake offers a diverse range of activities, from boating, jet-skiing, and fishing to various winter sports, attracting visitors year-round.

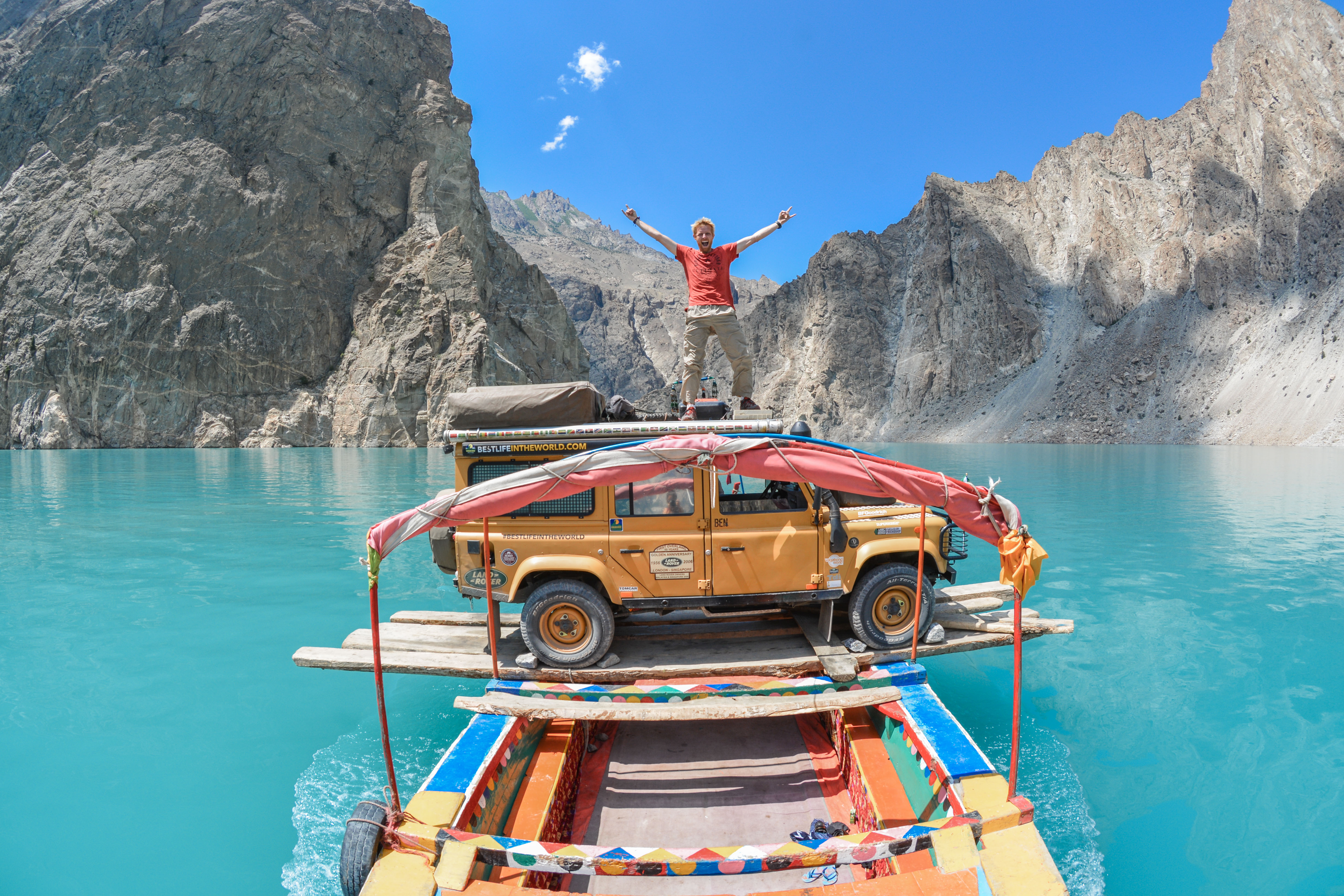
The lake submerged the local highway, and all traffic had to be shipped on barges until a new road tunnel was opened for traffic in September 2015.

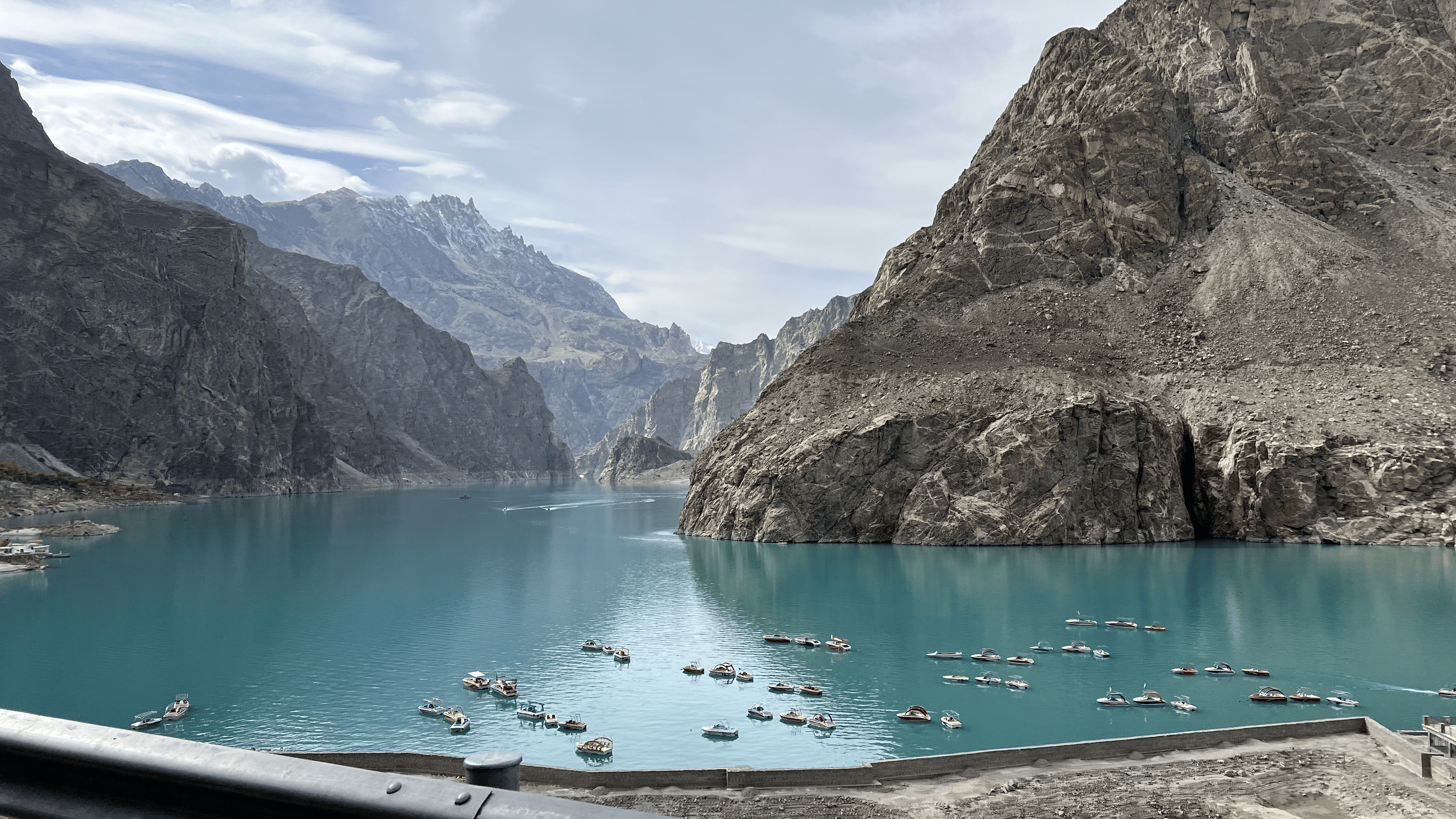
A view of the lake in autumn

== Formation ==
The genesis of the Attabad lake lies in a landslide, referred to as the Attabad landslide that occurred in the Attabad village within the Hunza Valley, in northern Pakistan. The substantial landslide, on 4 January 2010, occurred approximately 14 km (8.7 mi) upstream to the east of Karimabad, effectively damming the Hunza River and leading to the creation of this body of water. The landslide claimed the lives of twenty people and triggered the obstruction of the Hunza River's flow for five months. It also resulted in the displacement of around 6,000 residents from villages located upstream, while an additional 25,000 people found themselves stranded due to the disruption of transportation routes. Furthermore, the lake inundated over 19 km (12 mi) of the Karakoram Highway, a pivotal transportation artery in the region. The lake reached 21 km (13 mi) in length and over 100 m (330 ft) in depth by the first week of June, 2010, when it began flowing over the landslide dam, completely submerging lower Shishkat and partly flooding Gulmit. The subdivision of Gojal had the greatest number of flooded buildings, over 170 houses, and 120 shops. The residents also faced shortages of food and other items due to the blockage of the Karakoram Highway.

By 4 June 2010, water outflow from the lake had increased to 100 m^{3}/s (3,700 cu ft/s). The escalation of water levels persisted until 18 June 2010, driven by a disparity between the outflow and inflow dynamics of the newly formed lake. As bad weather continued, the supply of food, medicine and other goods was stopped as all forms of transportation including helicopter service to Hunza could not resume.

== Aftermath of landslide ==
Victims of the landslide and expansion of the lake staged a sit-in protesting the lack of government action and compensation payments to them.

As a result of the damming of the Hunza River, five villages north of the barrier were flooded. One village, Ayeenabad, was completely submerged. Major portions of another village, Shishkat, were also submerged. Around 40% of the village of Gulmit, which also serves as the headquarters of Gojal Valley, was also submerged. Significant portions of land in Hussaini and Ghulkin villages of Gojal also got submerged as a result of the surging lake. The entire population of the central Hunza and Gojal valleys (Upper Hunza), up to 25,000 individuals, were affected as a result of the lake formation. The challenges stemmed from the impediments posed by road access, hindering the populace from reaching business markets. Additionally, the community endured losses in terms of land, houses, and agricultural yields, further compounding the adverse effects brought about by the lake's emergence.

Attabad Lake was visited by the former prime ministers of Pakistan Yousuf Raza Gillani and Nawaz Sharif, and by the Chief Minister of Punjab, Shahbaz Sharif. Sharif announced Rs 100 million of aid for the victims from the Punjab government and Rs 0.5 million for the relatives of those who died in the landslide.

Areas downstream from the lake remained on alert despite some officials believing that a major flood scenario was less likely as the river began flowing over the landslide dam during the first week of June 2010. Many people have been evacuated to 195 relief camps. Two hospitals downstream, the Kashrote Eye Vision Hospital and the Aga Khan Health Service, evacuated both their staff and equipment. Some officials had incorrectly predicted that as soon as the lake began flowing over the landslide dam, an 18 m (60 ft) wave would hit the areas immediately downstream.

As of 14 June 2010, the water level continued to rise. Dawn News reported that "242 houses, 135 shops, four hotels, two schools, four factories, and several hundred acres of agricultural land" had been flooded, and that villagers were receiving food and school fee subsidies. They reported that 25 km (16 mi) of the Karakoram Highway and six bridges were destroyed.

Frontier Works Organization blasted the spillway of the lake first on 27 March 2012 and then on 15 May 2012, lowering the lake's water level by at least 10 m (33 ft).

== Karakoram Highway realignment ==
A part of the Karakoram Highway was submerged due to this landslide. On 14 September 2015, the then Prime Minister of Pakistan, Nawaz Sharif, performed the inauguration of the realigned 24 km (15 mi) patch of KKH containing five tunnels at Attabad Barrier Lake. The five tunnels are known as the Pakistan-China Friendship Tunnels, and are collectively 7 km (4.3 mi) long. They are part of the 24 km (15 mi) long portion of the Karakoram Highway (KKH) which was damaged in 2010 due to the landslide at Attabad. The realignment project was built at a cost of $275 million. The realignment restored the road link between Pakistan and China and it is expected that a significant amount of trade will be conducted between China and Pakistan using it. The KKH is also a part of the China–Pakistan Economic Corridor and is expected to significantly increase economic integration between those two nations.

== See also ==
- Tangjiashan Lake – formed by a landslide caused by the 2008 Sichuan earthquake in China
- Sarez Lake – formed by a landslide caused by the 1911 Sarez earthquake in Tajikistan
- Red Lake – formed by a landslide caused by the 1838 Vrancea earthquake in Romania
- 2010 Pakistan floods
- List of lakes of Pakistan
