= Hunza River =

River in Pakistan

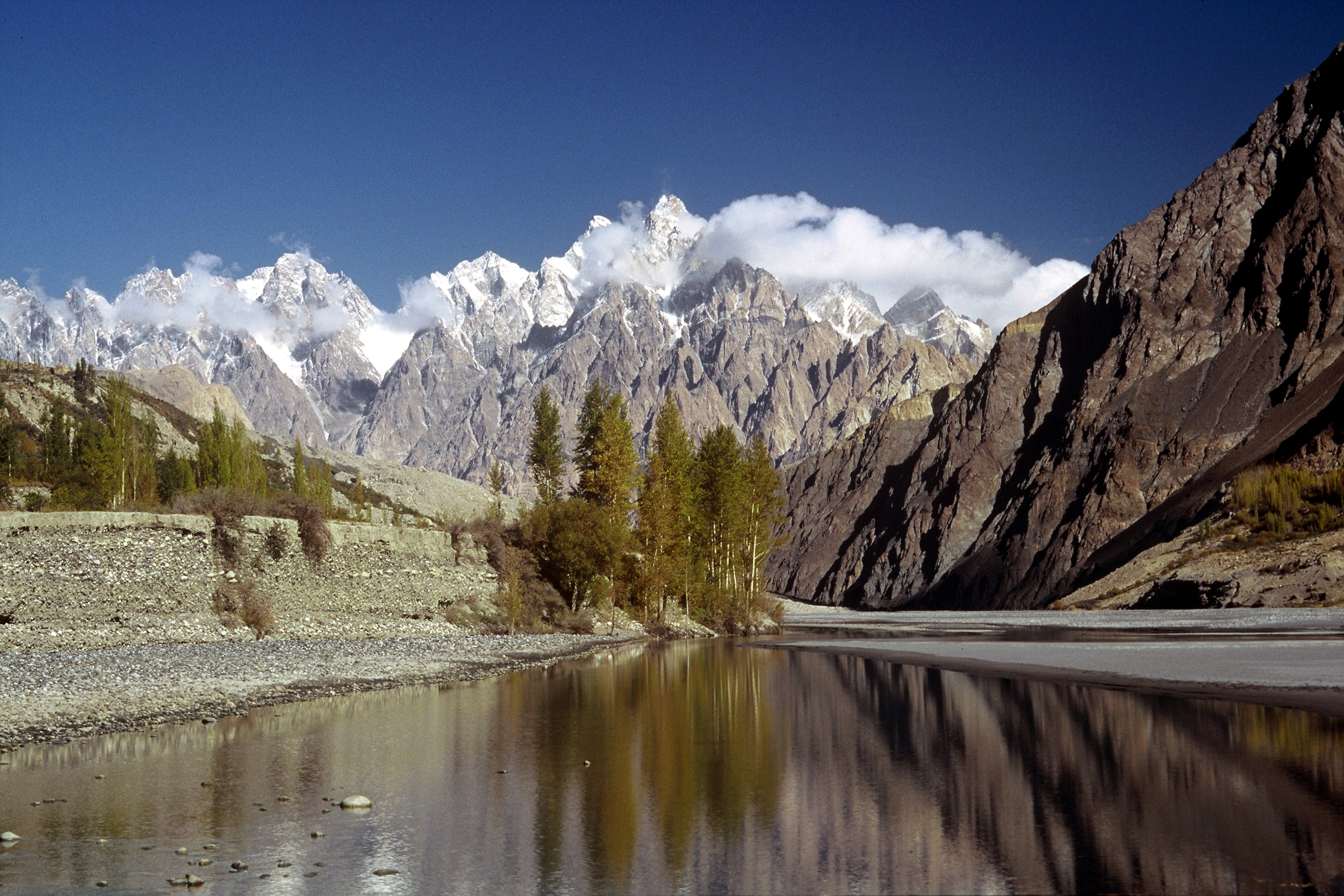
- Hunza river near Gulmit

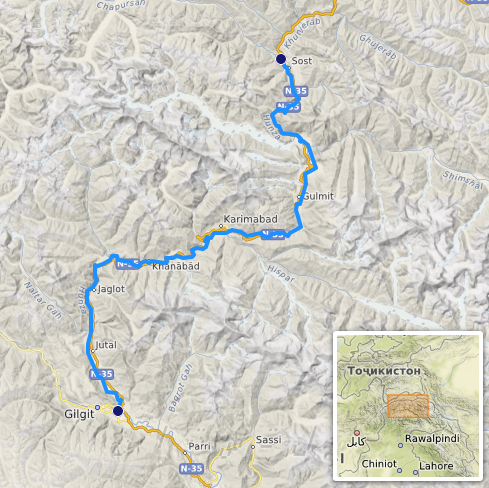

- Location within Gilgit Baltistan Location within Pakistan

Location
- Country: Pakistan
- Province: Gilgit-Baltistan

Physical characteristics
- Mouth
  - location: Gilgit River
  - coordinates: 35°55′N 74°22′E
- Basin size: 13,733 km^{2} (5,302 sq mi)
- Discharge
  - location: Danyor Gauging Station
  - average: 323 m^{3}/s (11,400 cu ft/s)

Hunza River (Urdu: دریائے ہنزہ) is the main river flowing across the Hunza Valley in the Pakistan-administered territory of Gilgit-Baltistan. It is formed by the confluence of the Chapursan and Khunjerab nalas (streams) which are fed by glaciers. It drains into the Gilgit River, which in turn flows into the Indus River.

== Course ==
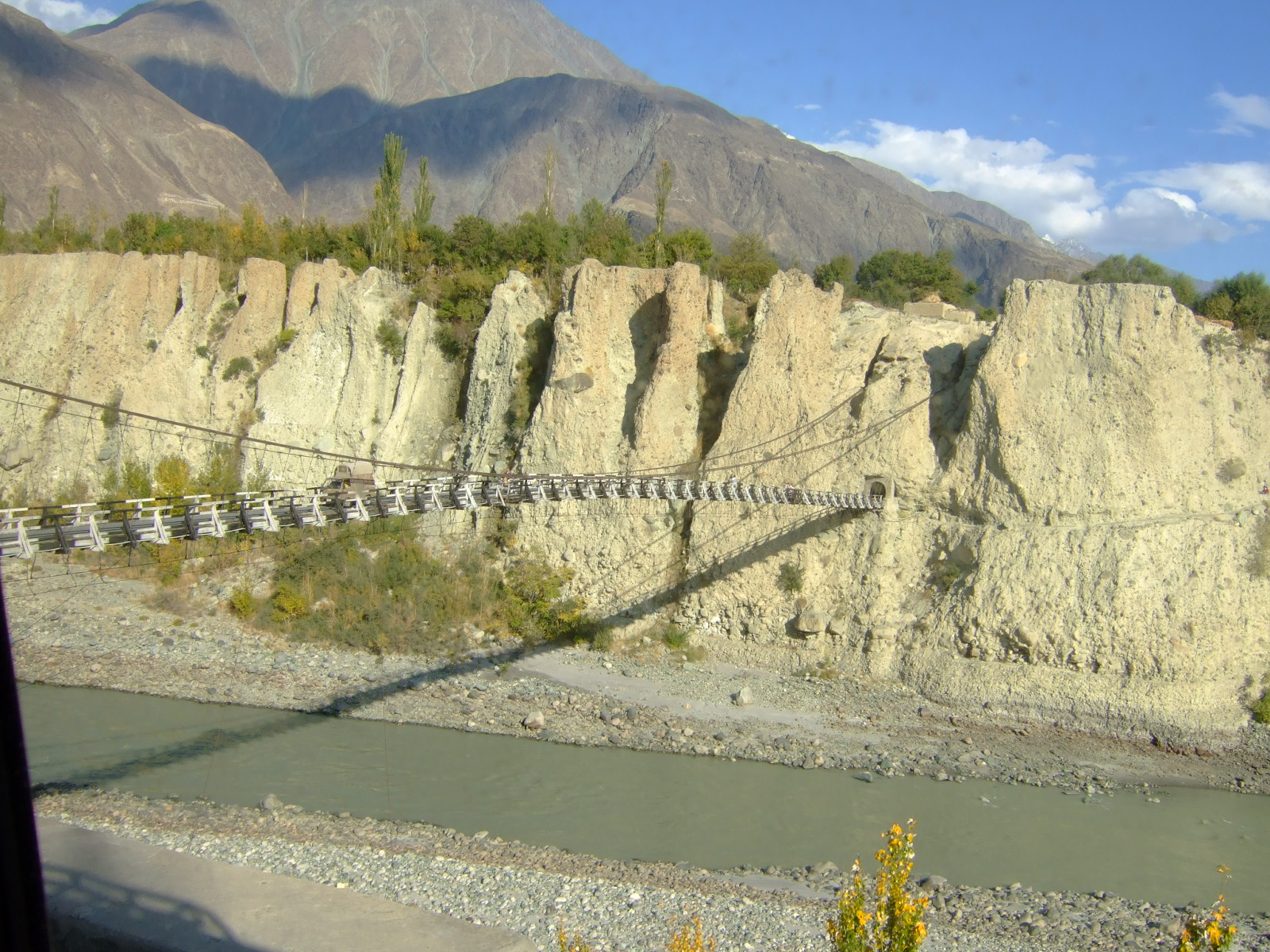
A view of Hunza River from Karakorum University, Danyor Bridge

The river cuts through the Karakoram Range, flowing from north to south. The Karakoram Highway (N-35) runs along the Hunza River Valley, switching to the Khunjerab River Valley at the point of confluence, eventually reaching the Khunjerab Pass at the border with China at Xinjiang.

== Hydrology ==
The catchment area of Hunza River is 13,733 km^{2} (5,302 sq mi) while its mean annual discharge is 323 m^{3}/s (11,400 cu ft/s). It is a major tributary of Gilgit River. The river is dammed for part of its route.

The Attabad landslide disaster in January 2010 completely blocked the Hunza River. The blocked river created a lake — called the Attabad Lake or Gojal Lake, which extended 30 kilometers and rose to a depth of 400 feet (approximately 122 meters). The landslide completely covered sections of the Karakoram Highway.

== See also ==
- Nagar Valley
