= Hunza District =

District in Pakistan-administered Gilgit-Baltistan

Hunza District ضلع ہنزہ ہُنزݳ ضِلع
- District of Gilgit-Baltistan administered by Pakistan
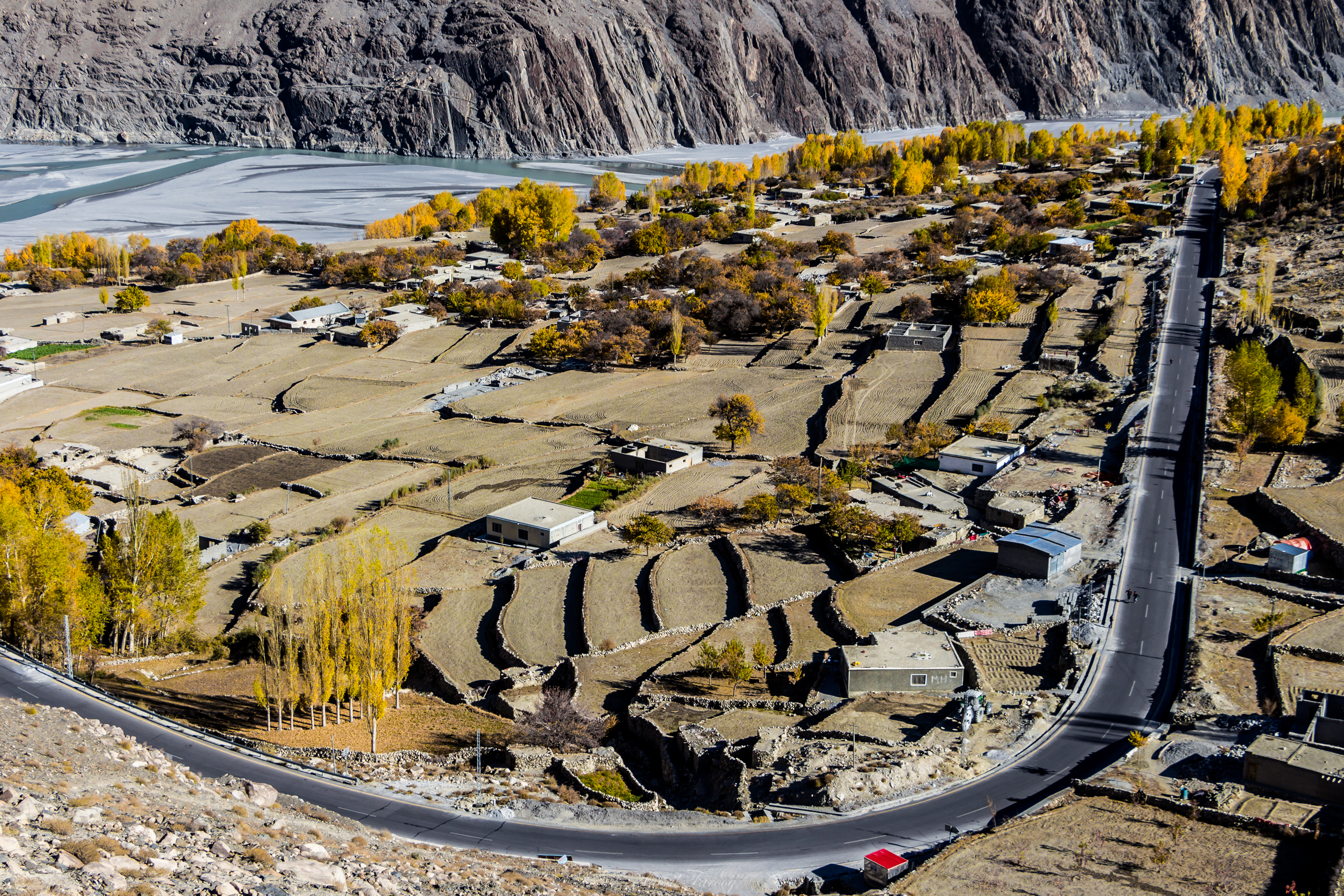
- Hussaini Village in Gojal (Upper Hunza)

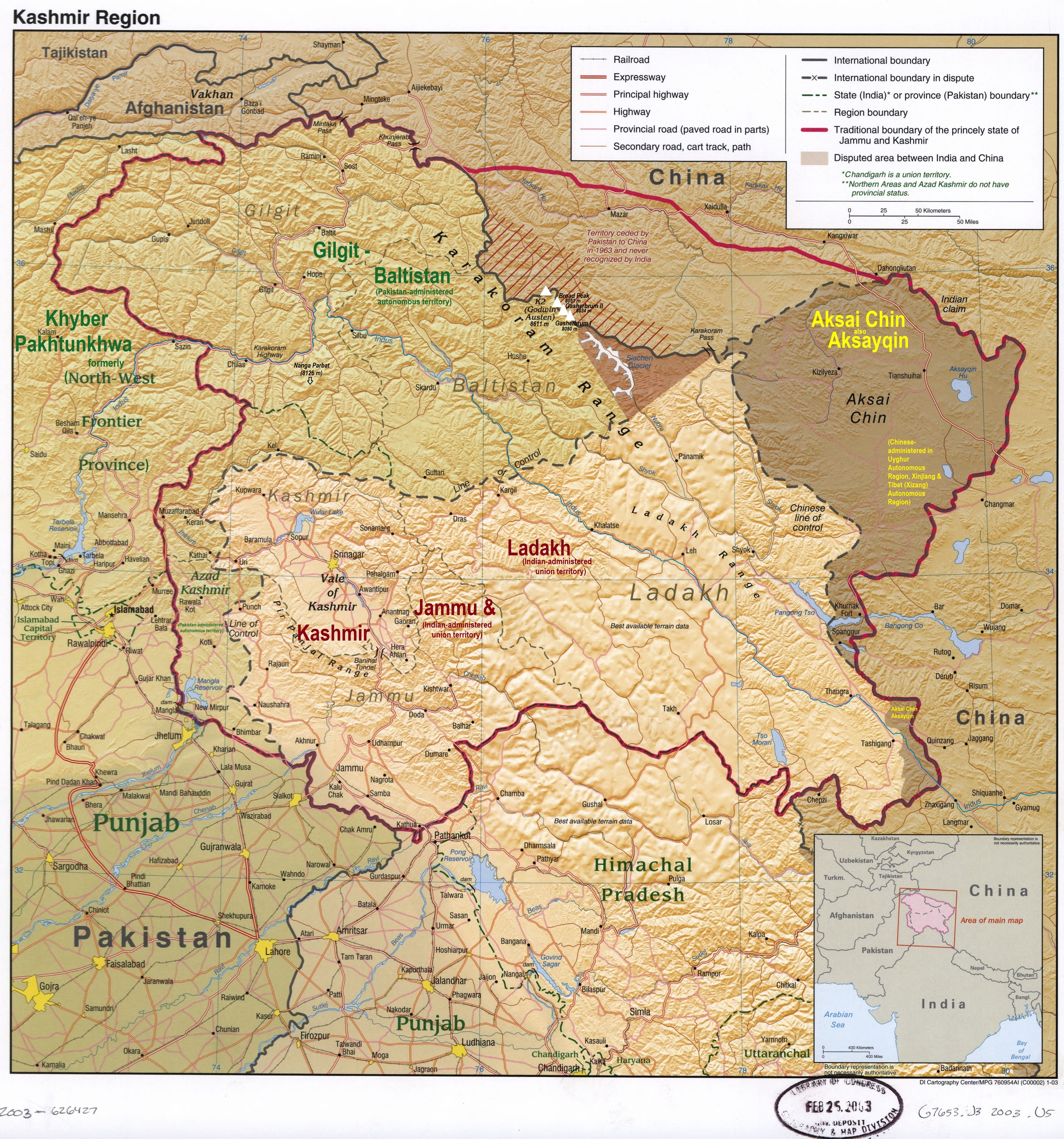
- A map showing Pakistani-administered Gilgit-Baltistan (shaded in sage green) in the disputed Kashmir region
- Interactive map of Hunza District
- Coordinates (Karimabad, Gilgit=Baltistan): 36°34′N 75°06′E
- Administering country: Pakistan
- Territory: Gilgit-Baltistan
- Division: Gilgit Division
- Established: 2015
- Headquarters: Karimabad

Government
  - Type: District Administration

Area
  - Total: 10,109 km^{2} (3,903 sq mi)

Population (2023)
  - Total: 65,497
  - Density: 6.4791/km^{2} (16.781/sq mi)
- Number of tehsils: 3

Hunza District (IPA: [ɦʊnza], Urdu: ضلع ہنزہ, Burushaski: ہُنزݳ ضِلع) is a district of Pakistan-administered Gilgit-Baltistan in the disputed Kashmir region. It was established in 2015 by the division of the Hunza–Nagar District in accordance with a government decision for administrative reforms in Gilgit-Baltistan. The district headquarters is the town of Baltit, officially known as Karimabad.

== Geography ==
The Hunza District largely coincides with the Hunza Valley. It is bounded on the north and east by the Kashgar Prefecture of China's Xinjiang Uyghur Autonomous Region, on the south by the Nagar District and the Shigar District, on the west by the Ghizer District, and on the north-west by the Wakhan District of Afghanistan's Badakhshan Province. It cover an area of 10,109 kilometers square.

Hunza is home to the historic passes through the Karakoram Mountains (the Killik, Mintaka, Khunjerab, and Shimshal passes) through which trade and religion passed between Central Asia, China, and India for centuries. The present-day Karakoram Highway passes through the Khunjerab Pass to enter China's Xinjiang Uyghur Autonomous Region. Less than 3% of the district consists of alpine pastures, with over 96% of remaining area being permanently snow-covered.

== History ==
For over 900 years Hunza was an independent principality, ruled by the Ayasho dynasty. Hunza became a subject to the British Raj in 1891 after Anglo-Brusho war. It also paid tribute to China and the maharaja of Jammu and Kashmir, and received subsidiaries from all three powers. Thus Hunza was in the anomalous position of being subject to two sovereign powers at the same time, immensely complicating the relations between British India and the Chinese empire. The practice of tribute to China was eventually stopped in 1930s. After the partition of India into the present-day India and Pakistan in 1947, the Maharaja of Jammu and Kashmir acceded his state to India in order to defend it against an invasion by Pakistani tribesmen. A rebellion in Gilgit then overthrew the Maharaja's authority. The Mir of Hunza subsequently acceded his state to Pakistan, but the accession was never formally accepted, due to the Kashmir dispute in the United Nations.

The Hunza state was abolished in 1974, after which it became a subdivision of Gilgit District. Hunza-Nagar District was established in 2008, which was later bifurcated into present-day Hunza and Nagar districts in 2015.

== Administration ==
Map of Gilgit–Baltistan with the Hunza District highlighted in red

Administratively, the Hunza District comprises three tehsils, Shinaki, Aliabad, and Gojal Tehsil. The villages of lower Hunza and central Hunza are located in the Aliabad Tehsil, whereas the villages from the Attabad Lake up to the Khunjerab Pass are located in the Gojal Tehsil. In lower Hunza, Shina is the main language, whereas in central Hunza, the dominant language is Burushaski, and in upper Hunza, Wakhi is the main language. District administration is exercised by the Deputy Commissioner (DC), with the assistance of an assistant commissioner. The Hunza police force is commanded by the Superintendent of Police (SP).

== Demographics ==
Hunza is ethnically very diverse. Ethni groups like Burusho, Yashkun, Shina, Gujjar, Wakhi, and Mughal are mainly found in Hunza district.

As of 2023, the total population of Hunza District was 65,497. The population is predominantly Muslim, with the majority being Nizari Isma'ili. Followers of Twelver Shi'ism and Sunnism also inhabit Hunza.

== Bibliography ==
- Dani, Ahmad Hasan (1998), "The Western Himalayan States" (PDF), in M. S. Asimov; C. E. Bosworth (eds.), History of Civilizations of Central Asia, Vol. IV, Part 1 — The age of achievement: A.D. 750 to the end of the fifteenth century — The historical, social and economic setting, UNESCO, pp. 215–225, ISBN 978-92-3-103467-1
- Harmatta, János (1996), History of Civilizations of Central Asia, Volume II: The development of sedentary and nomadic civilizations: 700 B.C. to AD> 250 (PDF), UNESCO Publishing, ISBN 978-92-3-102846-5
- Mehra, Parshotam (1992), An "agreed" frontier: Ladakh and India's northernmost borders, 1846-1947, Oxford University Press, ISBN 978-0-19-562758-9
- Pirumshoev, H. S.; Dani, Ahmad Hasan (2003), "The Pamirs, Badakhshan and the Trans-Pamir States" (PDF), in Chahryar Adle; Irfan Habib (eds.), History of Civilizations of Central Asia, Vol. V — Development in contrast: From the sixteenth to the mid-nineteenth century, UNESCO, pp. 225–246, ISBN 978-92-3-103876-1
- Puri, B. N. (1996), "The Sakas and Indo-Parthians" (PDF), in János Harmatta (ed.), History of Civilizations of Central Asia, Volume II: The development of sedentary and nomadic civilizations: 700 B.C. to AD> 250, UNESCO Publishing, pp. 184–201, ISBN 978-92-3-102846-5
