= Quetta Valley =

High-altitude basin in Balochistan, Pakistan

Geography
- Location: Pakistan

Quetta Valley (Note: Urdu: کوئٹہ وادی; Balochi: کوئٹہ وادی; Pashto: د کوټې دره; Dari: دره کویته) is a high-altitude basin region in Balochistan, Pakistan. It houses the provincial capital, Quetta, and is famous for its surrounding rugged mountains, rich fruit orchards, and strategic trade location.

== Peaks ==
The Quetta Valley is surrounded on all sides by mountains of Suliman Range:

- Zarghun to the north-east;
- Takatu to the north-west;
- Chiltan to the south-west;
- Murdar to the west.

== See also ==
- List of mountains in Pakistan
- Mountain ranges of Pakistan
