= Rush Peak =

Mountain in Pakistan

Rush Peak رش چوٹی
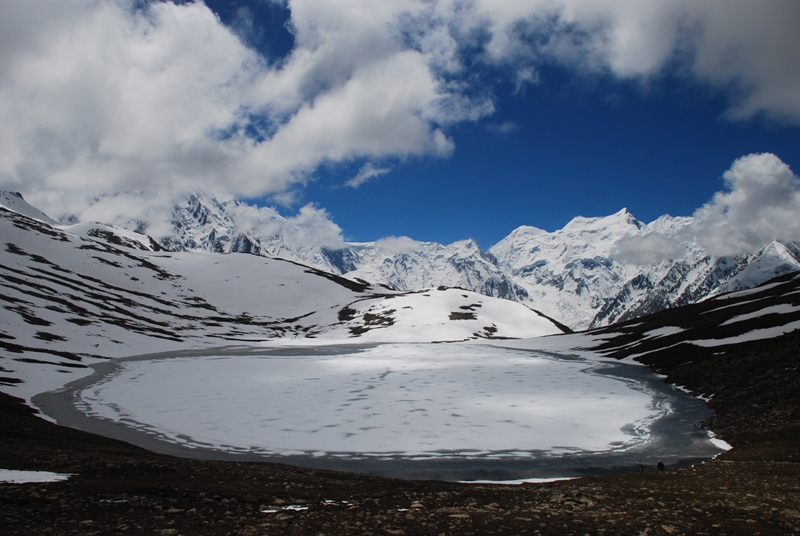
- Rush Lake below Rush Peak. Malubiting in the background.

Highest point
- Elevation: 5,098 m (16,726 ft)
- Coordinates: 36°10′14.3″N 74°53′23.1″E

Geography
- Location within Pakistan
- Location: Hispar, Pakistan
- Parent range: Karakoram

Rush Peak (Urdu: رش چوٹی) is a mountain in the Karakoram mountain range of Central Asia. It is located in Nagar District of Gilgit-Baltistan, Pakistan. While not a high peak by local standards, it is noteworthy as a trekking destination. It can be reached via Nagar Valley and Hoper Village. The peak can be accessed via Hoper Glacier (Bualtar Glacier) and Barpu Glacier. The peak is relatively easy to climb in the summer months and ascents have been made by amateur climbers without proper mountaineering gear. In winter, access to the mountain is made difficult by heavy snow. The top of the peak provides views of Miar Peak (6,824 m), Miar Glacier and Phuparash Peak (6,574 m). Looking east from Rush Peak on a clear day, some of the world's highest mountains, including K2 and Broad Peak are visible. At the mountain's base lies one of the world's highest alpine lakes, Rush Lake (4,694m).

== See also ==
- Rush Lake
- List of mountains in Pakistan
