= Crystal Peak (Pakistan) =

Mountain in Pakistan

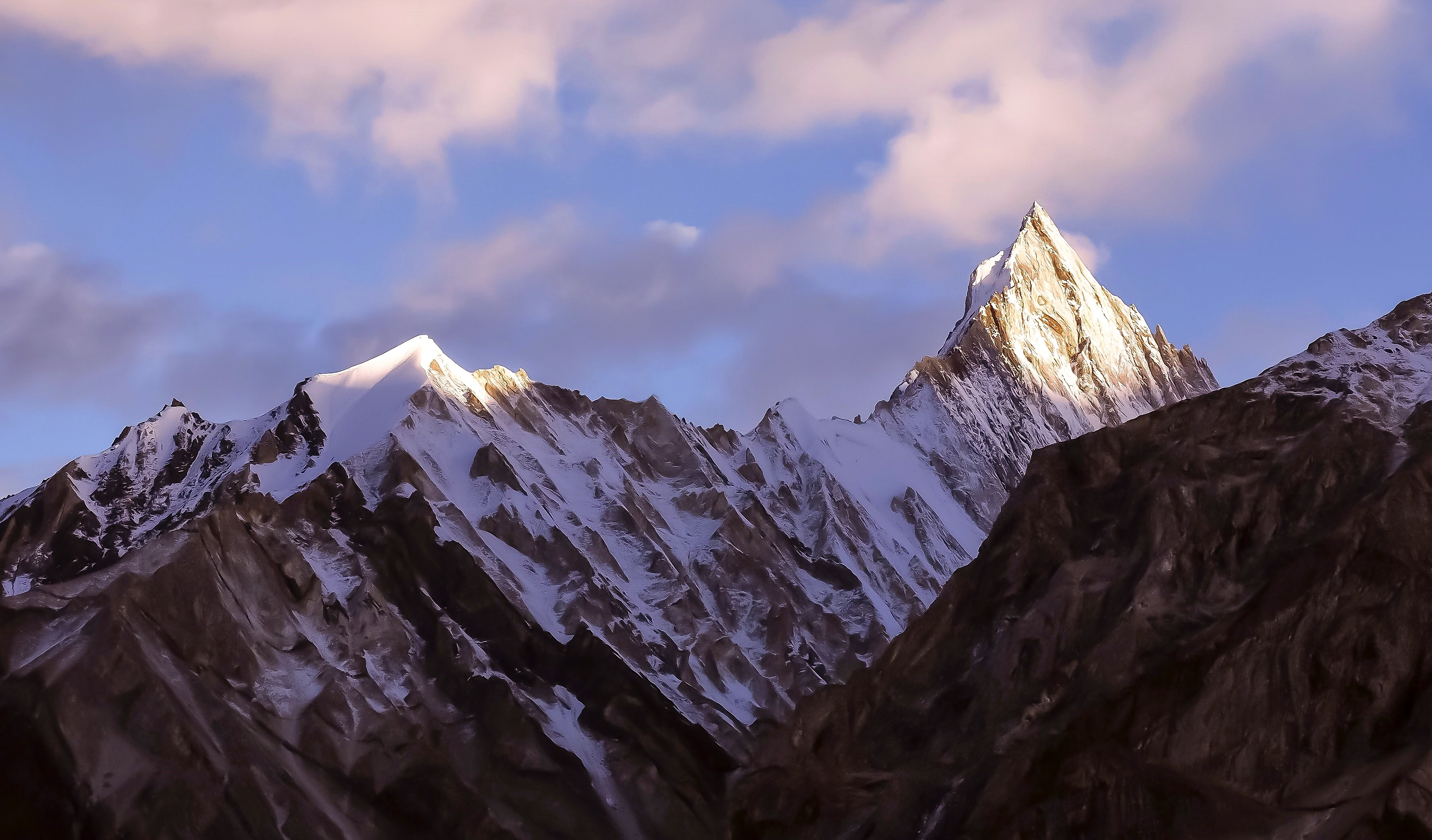
- Southeast aspect

Highest point
- Elevation: 6,252 m (20,512 ft)
- Isolation: 2 km (1.2 mi)
- Coordinates: 35°46′52″N 76°27′31″E

Geography
- Location within Karakoram Location within Gilgit Baltistan Location within Pakistan
- Interactive map of Crystal Peak
- Location: Kashmir
- Country: Pakistan
- Administrative territory: Gilgit-Baltistan
- District: Shigar
- Protected area: Central Karakoram National Park
- Parent range: Karakoram; Baltoro Muztagh

Geology
- Rock type(s): Gneiss, Limestone

Climbing
- First ascent: August 10, 1892

Crystal Peak is a mountain in northern Pakistan.

== Description ==
Crystal Peak is a 6,252-metre (20,512-foot) summit in the Baltoro Muztagh subrange of the Karakoram. The remote mountain is situated five kilometres (3.1 mi) northwest of the confluence of the Baltoro Glacier and Godwin-Austen Glacier in Central Karakoram National Park. It is located 12 kilometres (7.5 mi) south of K2 and two kilometres (1.2 mi) west of Marble Peak. Precipitation runoff from this mountain's slopes drains into the Braldu River drainage basin. Topographic relief is significant as the summit rises 1,850 metres (6,070 ft) above the Baltoro Glacier in three kilometres (1.9 mi). The first ascent of the summit was made on August 10, 1892, by Martin Conway, Charles Granville Bruce, Matthias Zurbriggen, Parbir Thapa, Harkbir Thapa, and Amar Singh. Conway's group so named this peak because of fine crystals the group found at the top.

== Climate ==
Based on the Köppen climate classification, Crystal Peak is located in a tundra climate zone with cold, snowy winters, and cool summers. Weather systems are forced upwards by the mountains (orographic lift), causing heavy precipitation in the form of rainfall and snowfall. October through November is the monsoon season. The months of June, July, and August offer the most favorable weather for visiting or climbing this peak.

== See also ==
- List of mountains in Pakistan
