= Angel Sar =

Mountain in Pakistan

- Angelus; Angel Peak
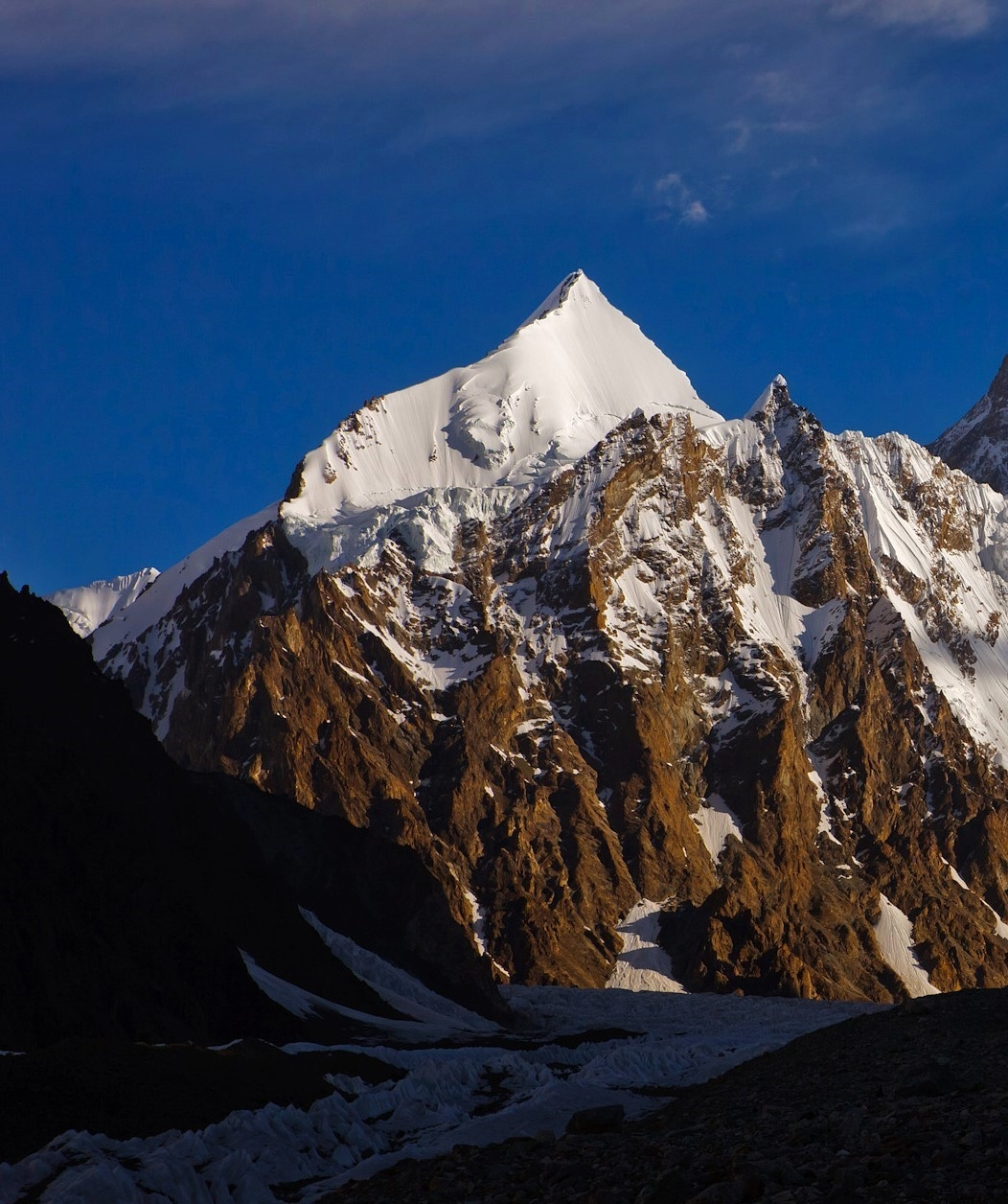
- East aspect

Highest point
- Elevation: 6,802 m (22,316 ft)
- Prominence: 462 m (1,516 ft)
- Parent peak: K2
- Isolation: 0.12 km (0.075 mi)
- Listing: List of mountains in Pakistan
- Coordinates: 35°50′57″N 76°29′26″E

Naming
- Native name: اینجل سر (Urdu)

Geography
- Location within Karakoram Location within Gilgit Baltistan Location within Pakistan
- Interactive map of Angel Sar
- Country: Pakistan
- Administrative Area: Gilgit-Baltistan
- Division: Baltistan
- District: Shigar
- Protected area: Central Karakoram National Park
- Parent range: Baltoro Muztagh

Climbing
- First ascent: 9 August 1983

Angel Sar also known as Angelus or Angel Peak (Urdu: اینجل سر) is a 6,802-metre (22,316 ft) high mountain in the Baltoro Muztagh range of Gilgit–Baltistan, Pakistan. The peak is on the southwest ridge of K2, the second highest mountain on Earth. The mountain was first climbed on 9 August 1983 by Michel Afanassieff and Claude Stucki.

== Climate ==
Based on the Köppen climate classification, Angel Sar is located in a tundra climate zone with cold, snowy winters, and cool summers. Weather systems are forced upwards by the mountains (orographic lift), causing heavy precipitation in the form of rainfall and snowfall. October through November is the monsoon season. The months of June, July, and August offer the most favorable weather for visiting or climbing this peak.

== Gallery ==
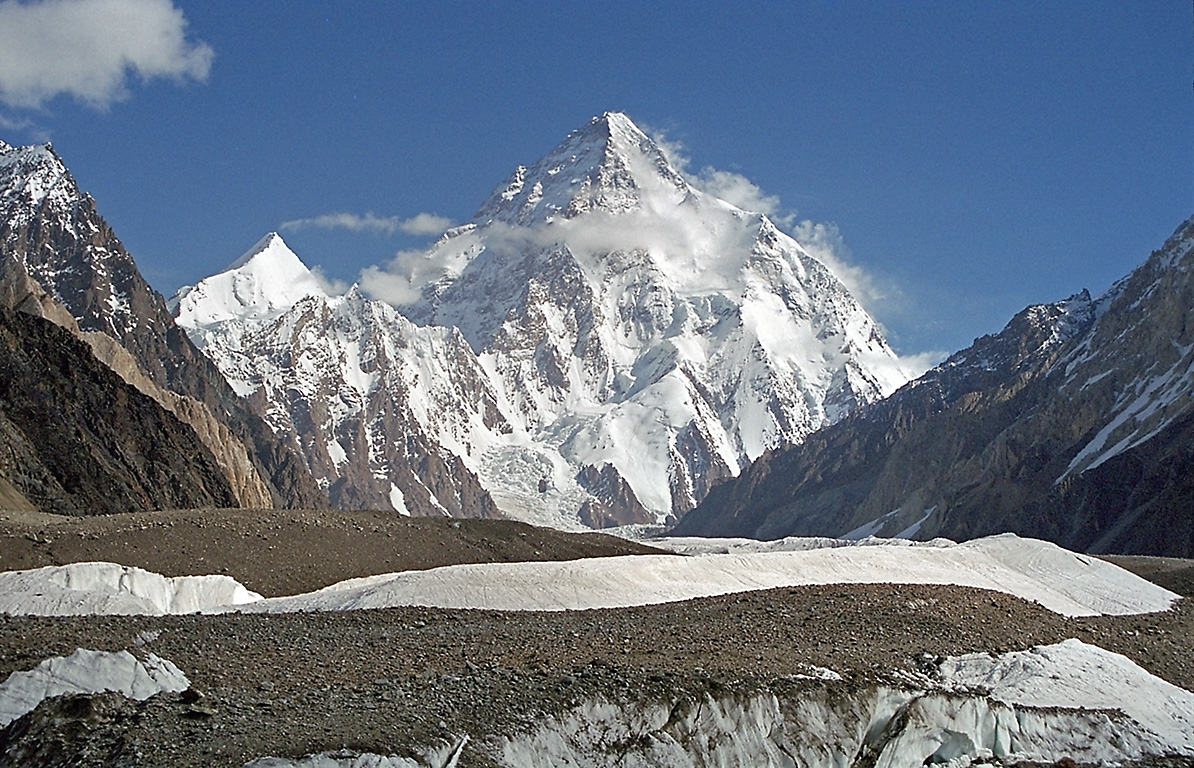
Viewed from Concordia, Angel Sar is on the SSW ridge of K2 (the white pyramid left of K2).

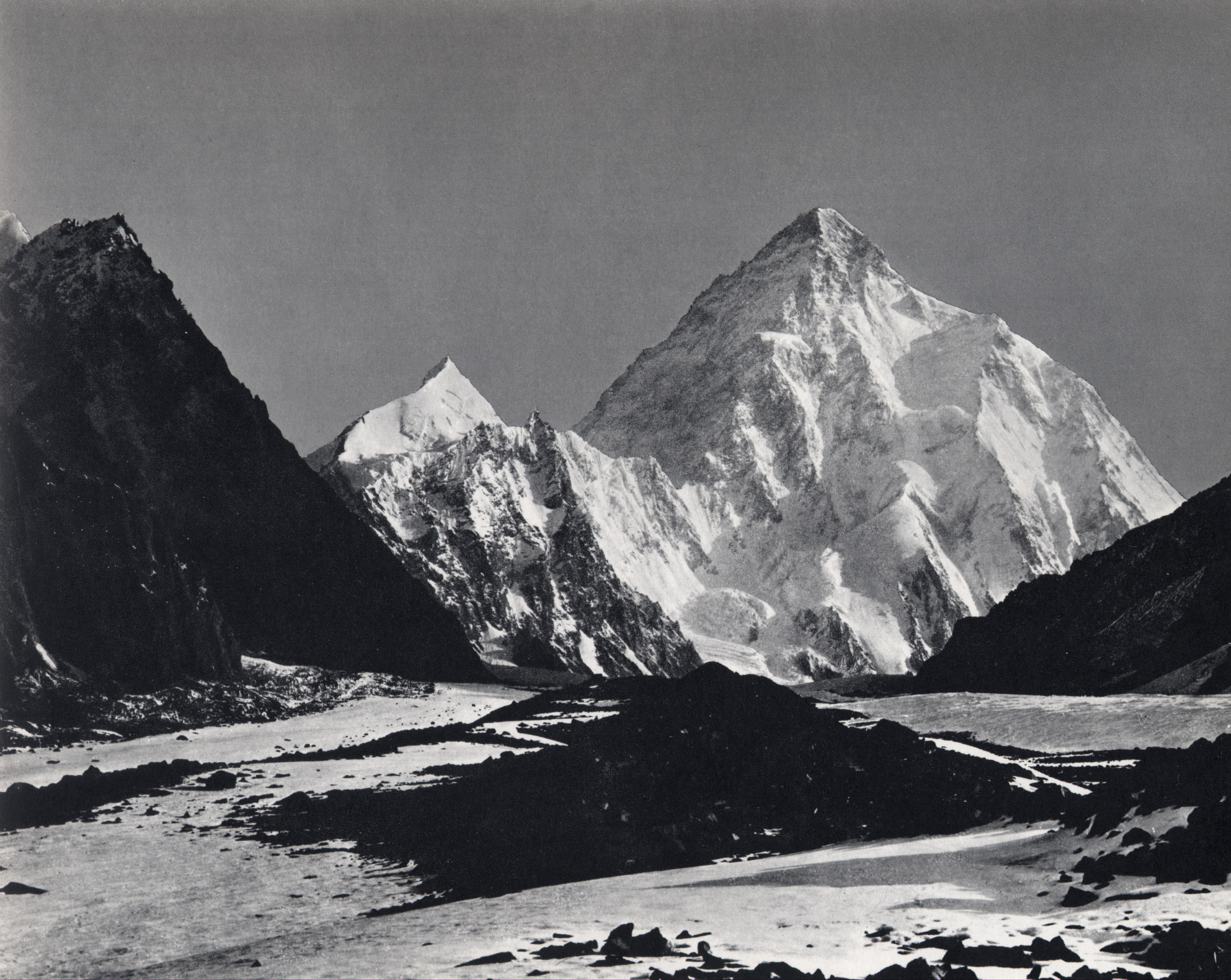
Angel Sar and K2 in 1909

== See also ==
- List of mountains in Pakistan
