= Baltoro Kangri =

Mountain in Pakistan

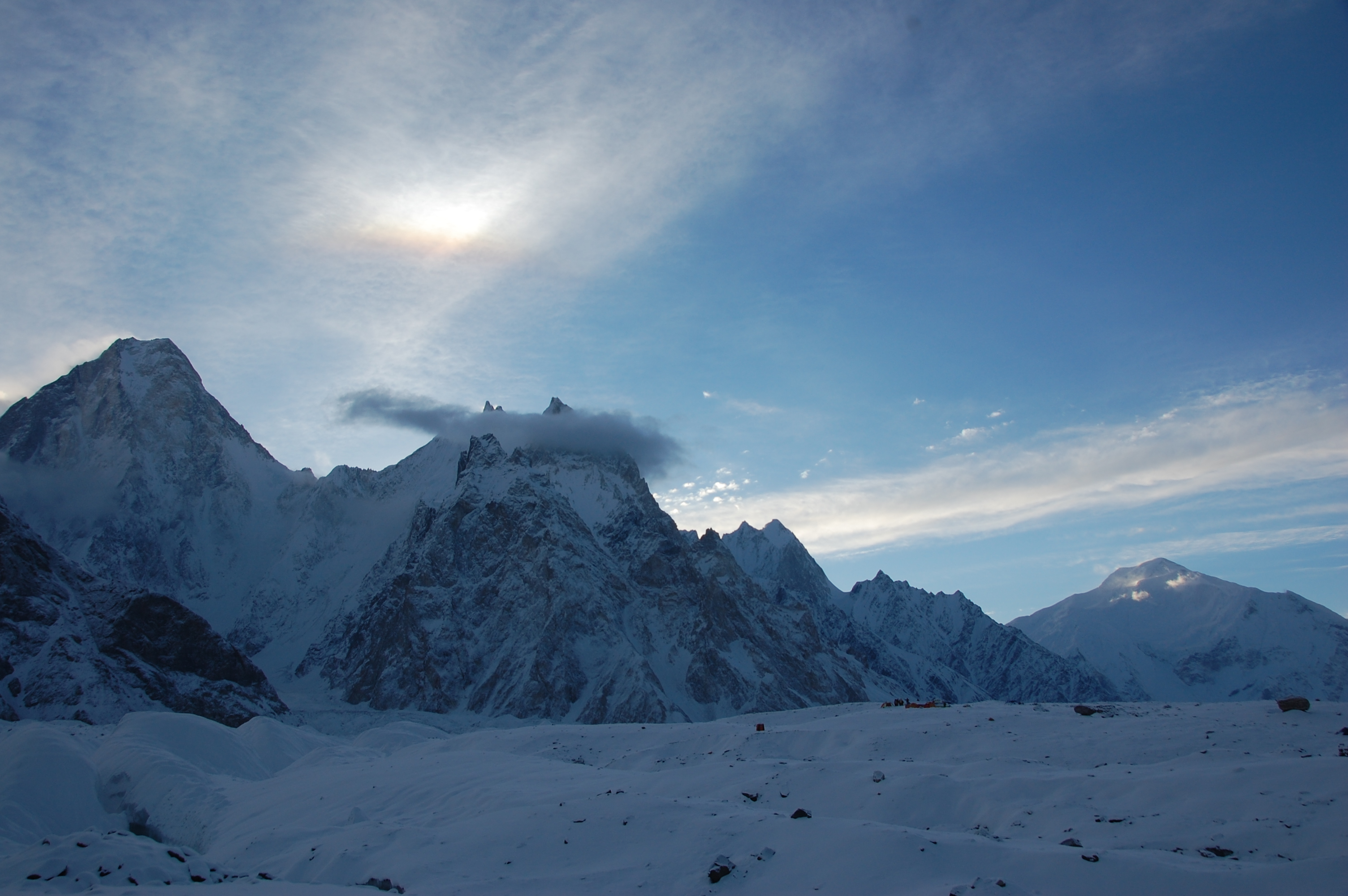
- Gasherbrum IV, VII, VI and Baltoro Kangri on the right

Highest point
- Elevation: 7,312 m (23,990 ft)
- Prominence: 1,040 m (3,410 ft)
- Listing: Mountains of Pakistan; Highest mountains on Earth (#81)
- Coordinates: 35°38′45″N 76°39′56″E

Naming
- Native name: بلتورو کنگری (Urdu)

Geography
- Location within Pakistan Location within Gilgit Baltistan
- The major peaks in Karakoram are rank identified by height. Legend: 1：K2; 2：Gasherbrum I, K5; 3：Broad Peak; 4：Gasherbrum II, K4; 5：Gasherbrum III, K3a; 6：Gasherbrum IV, K3; 7：Distaghil Sar; 8：Kunyang Chhish; 9：Masherbrum, K1; 10：Batura Sar, Batura I; 11：Rakaposhi; 12：Batura II; 13：Kanjut Sar; 14：Saltoro Kangri, K10; 15：Batura III; 16： Saser Kangri I, K22; 17：Chogolisa; 18：Shispare; 19：Trivor Sar; 20：Skyang Kangri; 21：Mamostong Kangri, K35; 22：Saser Kangri II; 23：Saser Kangri III; 24：Pumari Chhish; 25：Passu Sar; 26：Yukshin Gardan Sar; 27：Teram Kangri I; 28：Malubiting; 29：K12; 30：Sia Kangri; 31：Momhil Sar; 32：Skil Brum; 33：Haramosh Peak; 34：Ghent Kangri; 35：Ultar Sar; 36：Rimo Massif; 37：Sherpi Kangri; 38：Yazghil Dome South; 39：Baltoro Kangri; 40：Crown Peak; 41：Baintha Brakk; 42：Yutmaru Sar; 43：K6; 44：Muztagh Tower; 45：Diran; 46：Apsarasas Kangri I; 47：Rimo III; 48：Gasherbrum V; Location in Gilgit-Baltistan
- Country: Pakistan
- Region: Gilgit-Baltistan
- District: Skardu
- Parent range: Karakoram

Climbing
- First ascent: August 4, 1963

Baltoro Kangri
- Simplified Chinese: 巴托羅崗日峰
Transcriptions

Baltoro Kangri (Urdu: بلتورو کنگری also known as the Golden Throne) is a mountain of the Karakoram mountain range in Gilgit-Baltistan, Pakistan. Baltoro Kangri is the 82nd highest mountain in the world with an elevation of 7,312 metres (23,990 ft). It lies to the south of the Gasherbrums and east of Chogolisa Peak (7,665 m). The huge Baltoro Glacier (which is one of the largest glaciers outside polar regions) rises from the foot of Baltoro Kangri. On the northern side of Baltoro Kangri lies the Abruzzi Glacier.

In 1963, a Japanese expedition made the first ascent of Baltoro Kangri, on the morning of August 4. The expedition consisted of nine members from the Tokyo University Ski Alpine Club, which was led by Dr. Seihei Kato.

== See also ==
- Baltoro Muztagh
