= Koh-i-Chiltan =

Mountain in Pakistan

Coordinates: 30°56′N 66°49′E

Koh-i-Chiltan کوہ چلتن
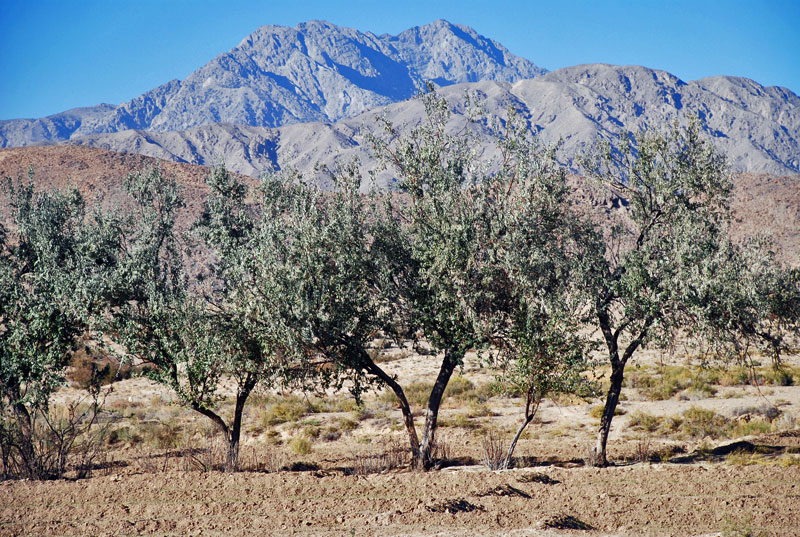

Highest point
- Elevation: 3,194 m (10,479 ft)

Geography
- Location: Quetta, Pakistan
- Parent range: Sulaiman Mountains

Koh-i-Chiltan (Urdu: کوه چلتن; Balochi: کوہٖ‌ چٖلتن; Pashto: کوهي چلتان; Dari: کوه چلتن) is a peak located in the Chiltan mountain group of the Sulaiman Mountains, in the Quetta District of Balochistan Province, in western Pakistan.

Koh-i-Chiltan is the summit of a steep, rocky mountain called Chiltan or Chehel-Tan (چهل تن) in Persian and Brahui, which means "forty bodies". It is the third-highest peak in Quetta after Zarghun Ghar and Koh-i-Takatu, and the fifth-highest peak of Balochistan. There are many juniper trees found in high ranges.

== In legends ==
In local Balochi folk Tradition, Koh-i-Chiltan is said to be haunted. A story from Balochi culture about the mountain tells the tale:

A frugal couple, married for many years, were unblessed with offspring. They therefore sought the advice of a holy man, who rebuked the wife, saying that he had not the power to grant her what Heaven had denied. The priest's son, however (also a holy man), felt convinced he could satisfy her wishes, and cast forty pebbles into her lap, at the same time praying that she might bear children. In time, the wife gave birth to forty babies—far more than she had wished for or could care for. The husband, at his wits' end, ascended to the summit of Chehel-Tan with thirty-nine of the children and left them to fend for themselves while the fortieth baby was brought up under the paternal roof.
One day, however, touched by remorse, the wife unknown to her husband explored the mountain with the object of collecting the bones of her children and burying them. To her surprise, they were all living and gambolling among the trees and rocks. Wild with joy she ran back to her dwelling brought out the fortieth babe and placing it on the summit of the mountain left it there for a night to allure back its brothers, but on returning in the morning she found that the latter had carried it off and it was never seen again. It is by the spirits of these forty babies that Chehel-Tan is said to be haunted.

== See also ==
- Hazarganji-Chiltan National Park
- Geography of Balochistan, Pakistan
- List of mountains in Pakistan
- Mountain ranges of Pakistan
