= Phuparash Peak =

Mountain in Pakistan

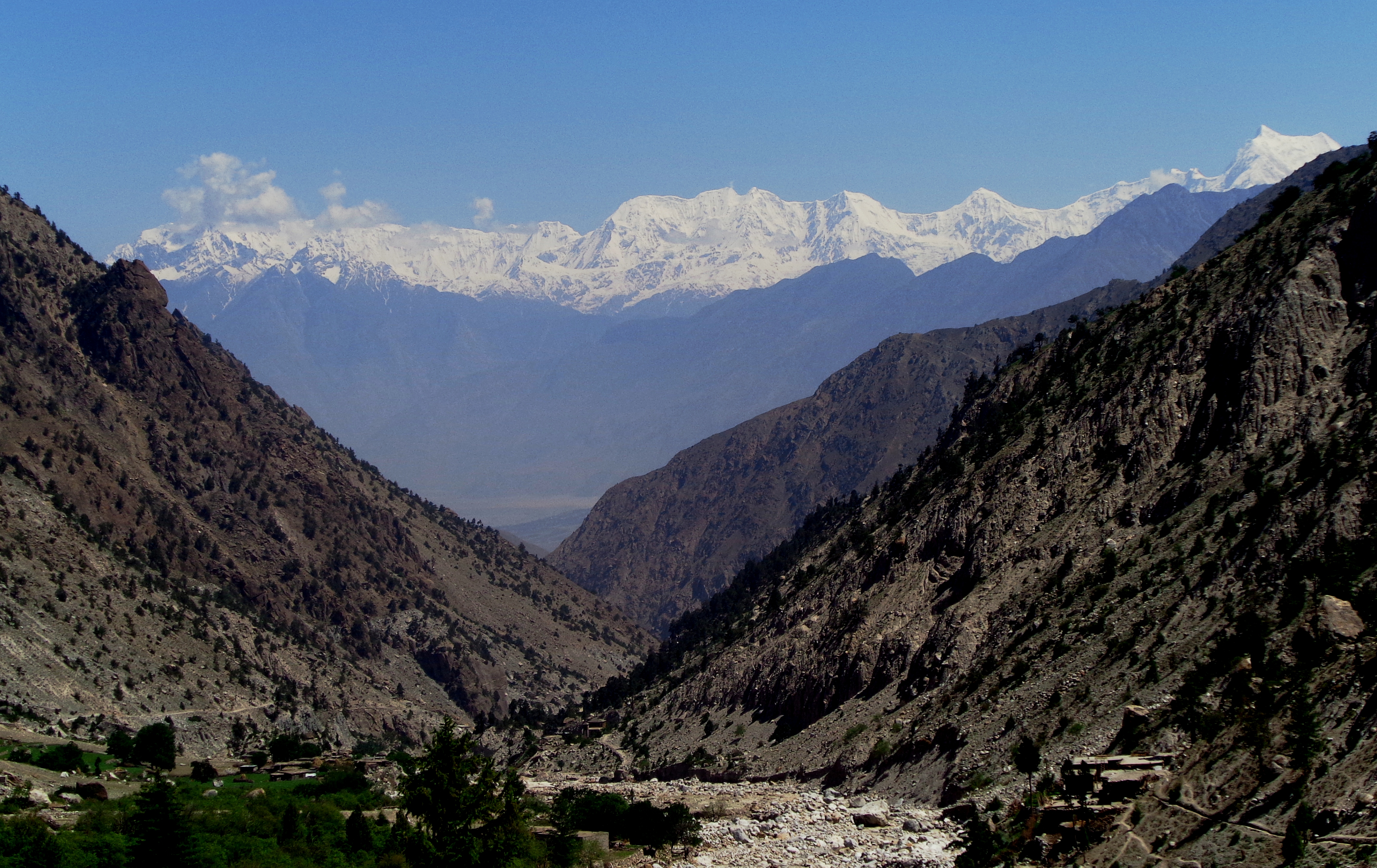
- View of Phuparash among other mountain tops

Highest point
- Elevation: 6,574 m (21,568 ft)
- Prominence: 475 m (1,558 ft)
- Coordinates: 36°3′0.68″N 74°49′30.03″E

Geography
- Location: Hispar, Pakistan
- Parent range: Karakoram

Phuparash Peak is a mountain in Hispar Valley in the Gilgit District, Gilgit–Baltistan, Pakistan. It lies east of Miar Peak (6,824 m). The Phuparash and Miar glaciers are nearby. the peak is visible while trekking to Rush Lake.

== See also ==
- List of mountains in Pakistan
