= Rush Lake (Pakistan) =

Lake in Pakistan

Rush Lake رش جھیل
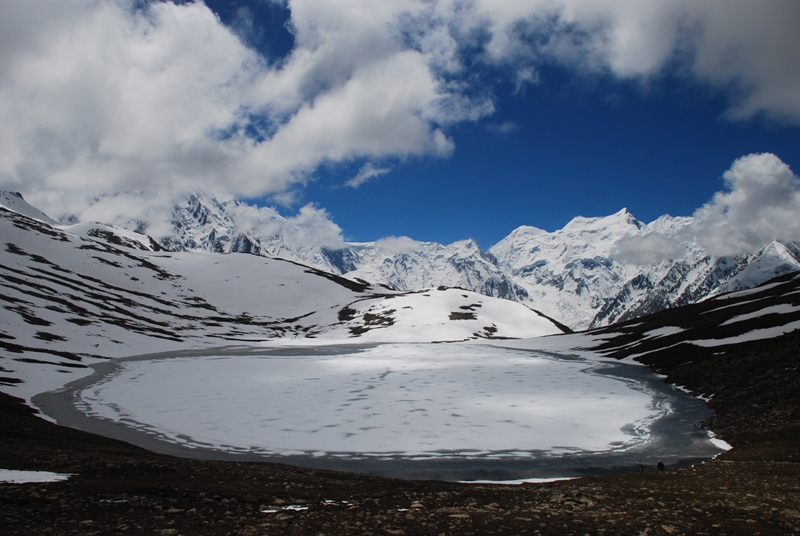

- Location within Gilgit Baltistan
- Location: Hoper valley Nagar Valley, Gilgit-Baltistan
- Coordinates: 36.1745°N 74.8825°E
- Type: Alpine lake, Glacial Lake
- Primary outflows: Miar Glacier
- Basin countries: Pakistan
- Surface elevation: 4,694 m (15,400 ft)
- Settlements: Nagar Valley, Gilgit Baltistan

Rush Lake (Urdu: رش جھیل) is a high-altitude lake located in Nagar Valley, Gilgit-Baltistan, Pakistan near Rush Peak. At 4,694 metres (15,400 ft), Rush is one of the highest alpine lakes in the world. It is located about 15 km (9 mi) north of Miar Peak and Spantik (Golden Peak) in the Nagar Valley. It is one of the highest lakes in Pakistan and the 27th highest in the world.

Rush Lake and Rush Peak are reached via Nagar and Hopar Valley via the Hopar Glacier (Bualtar Glacier) and Miar Glacier, which rises from Miar and Phuparash peaks. The trek to Rush Lake provides picturesque views of Spantik, Malubiting, Miar Peak, Phuparash Peak, and Ultar Sar.

== See also ==
- Hopar Valley
- List of lakes of Pakistan
