= Gasherbrum III =

Mountain in Pakistan and China

- Location within Gilgit Baltistan Location within Southern Xinjiang
- The major peaks in Karakoram are rank identified by height. Legend: 1：K2; 2：Gasherbrum I, K5; 3：Broad Peak; 4：Gasherbrum II, K4; 5：Gasherbrum III, K3a; 6：Gasherbrum IV, K3; 7：Distaghil Sar; 8：Kunyang Chhish; 9：Masherbrum, K1; 10：Batura Sar, Batura I; 11：Rakaposhi; 12：Batura II; 13：Kanjut Sar; 14：Saltoro Kangri, K10; 15：Batura III; 16： Saser Kangri I, K22; 17：Chogolisa; 18：Shispare; 19：Trivor Sar; 20：Skyang Kangri; 21：Mamostong Kangri, K35; 22：Saser Kangri II; 23：Saser Kangri III; 24：Pumari Chhish; 25：Passu Sar; 26：Yukshin Gardan Sar; 27：Teram Kangri I; 28：Malubiting; 29：K12; 30：Sia Kangri; 31：Momhil Sar; 32：Skil Brum; 33：Haramosh Peak; 34：Ghent Kangri; 35：Ultar Sar; 36：Rimo Massif; 37：Sherpi Kangri; 38：Yazghil Dome South; 39：Baltoro Kangri; 40：Crown Peak; 41：Baintha Brakk; 42：Yutmaru Sar; 43：K6; 44：Muztagh Tower; 45：Diran; 46：Apsarasas Kangri I; 47：Rimo III; 48：Gasherbrum V; Location of Gasherbrum III

Highest point
- Elevation: 7,952 m (26,089 ft)
- Prominence: 461 m (1,512 ft)
- Coordinates: 35°44′N 76°38′E

Geography
- Location: Baltistan, Gilgit-Baltistan, Pakistan; Xinjiang, China (Note: As part of the Kashmir Dispute, this region is also claimed by India. The massif is under the control of Pakistan; it lies just north of the Line of Control.)
- Parent range: Karakoram

Climbing
- First ascent: 1975 by Wanda Rutkiewicz, Alison Chadwick-Onyszkiewicz, Janusz Onyszkiewicz and Krzysztof Zdzitowiecki
- Easiest route: snow/ice climb

Gasherbrum III, (Note: Balti: རྒ་ཥཱ་བྲུམ་། - ༣, romanized: rgasha brum - 3, lit. 'Beautiful Mountain - 3'; Urdu: گاشر برم۔۳; simplified Chinese: 加舒尔布鲁木III峰; traditional Chinese: 加舒爾布魯木III峰; pinyin: Jiāshūěrbùlǔmù III Fēng) surveyed as K3a, is a summit in the Gasherbrum massif of the Baltoro Muztagh, a subrange of the Karakoram on the border between Xinjiang, China and Gilgit-Baltistan, Pakistan. It is situated between Gasherbrum II and IV.

Gasherbrum III fails to meet a 500 metres (1,600 ft) topographic prominence cutoff to be an independent mountain; hence it can be considered a subpeak of Gasherbrum II. (Note: Some sources use a lower cutoff value, and consider Gasherbrum III to be independent.)

Gasherbrum III was one of the highest unclimbed summits in the world up to its first ascent in 1975, (Note: In fact no summit in 1975 was both higher and more topographically prominent.) by Wanda Rutkiewicz, Alison Chadwick-Onyszkiewicz, Janusz Onyszkiewicz and Krzysztof Zdzitowiecki, members of a Polish expedition.

== See also ==
- List of mountains in Pakistan
- List of highest mountains on Earth
