= Akher Chhish =

Mountain in the Hindu Kush range

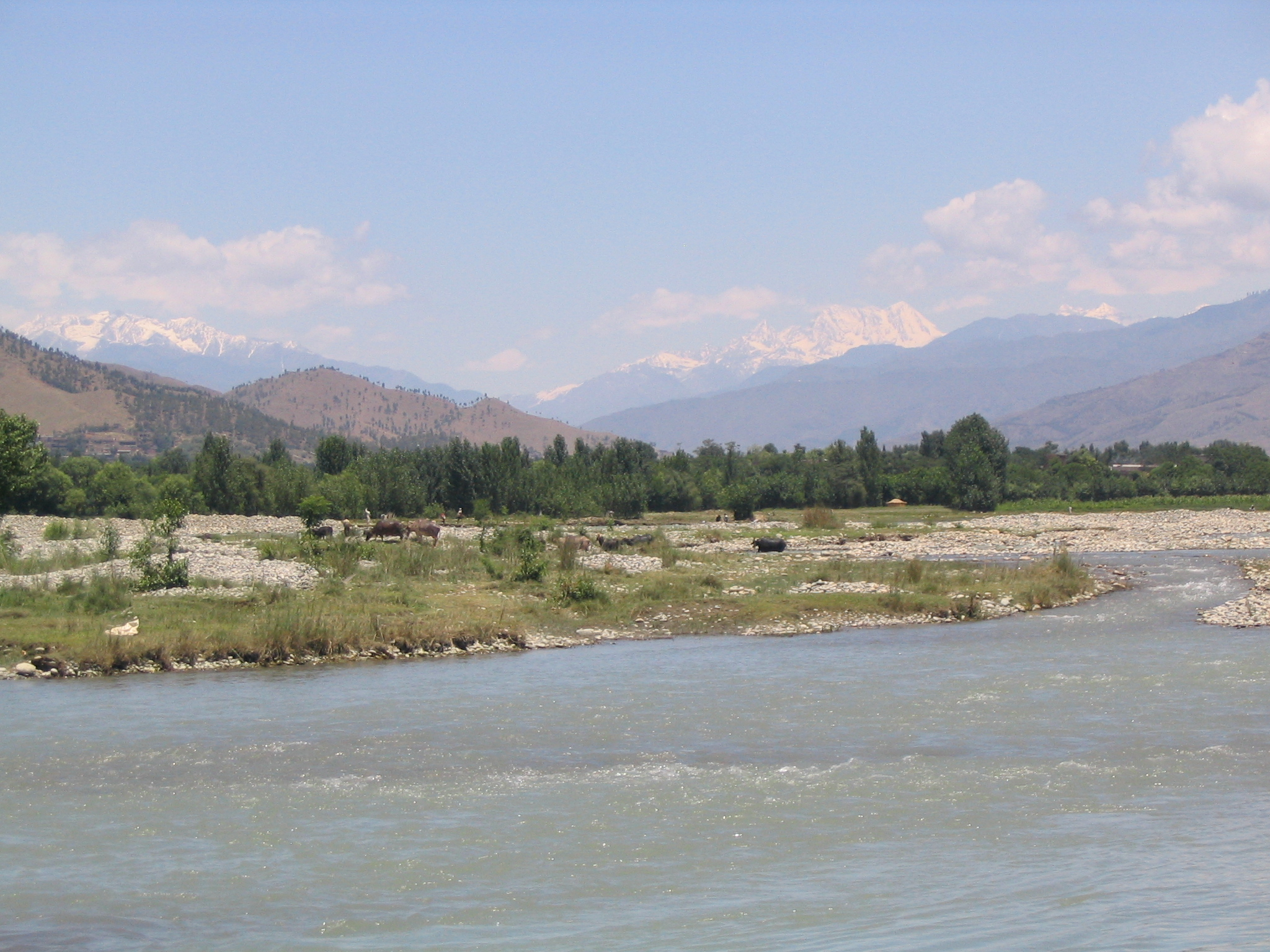
- Viewed from a nearby river

Highest point
- Elevation: 7,020 m (23,030 ft)
- Coordinates: 36°50′N 74°00′E

Geography
- Country: Pakistan
- State: Gilgit-Baltistan
- Parent range: Hindukush

Akher Chhish is a 7,020 metres (23,030 ft)-high mountain in the Hindu Kush range, Pakistan. It is covered in gigantic glaciers, typical for its altitude, and is a popular tourist site. It is one of the highest in its range, at over 7,000 meters. Acclimatization is required due to the extremely high altitude.

== Geology ==
The Hindu Kush are made of metamorphic rock, formed about 115 million years ago, and are the product of the Eurasian-Indian collision starting around 50 million years ago. The area is seismically active and has many and frequent earthquakes. The Hindu Kush mountains contain granites from the Cenozoic as well as metamorphic rocks. The Heart Fault is to the south of Akher Chhish.

== Geography and environment ==
Akher Chhish is in the monsoon-influenced east-center of the range (Dwc or BSk climate), to the south of the cold desert (BWk) on the Afghan side, but to the west of the Greater Himalayas.

The Hindu Kush are very varied in terms of climate. Since Akher Chhish is in the east-center (not too far from the junction with the Karakorams), and on the Pakistani side, it is a dry semidesert (BSk), with severely cold, snowless winters and cool to warm, damp summers on the lower slopes, and extremely cold, snowy winters and cool to cold, less damp summers higher up, on the tundra (ET) below the glaciers. The snow line is at approximately 3,700 metres (12,000 ft), partially due to the dry climate of the central Hindukush. At the very top, it is cold and snowy all year long (EF).

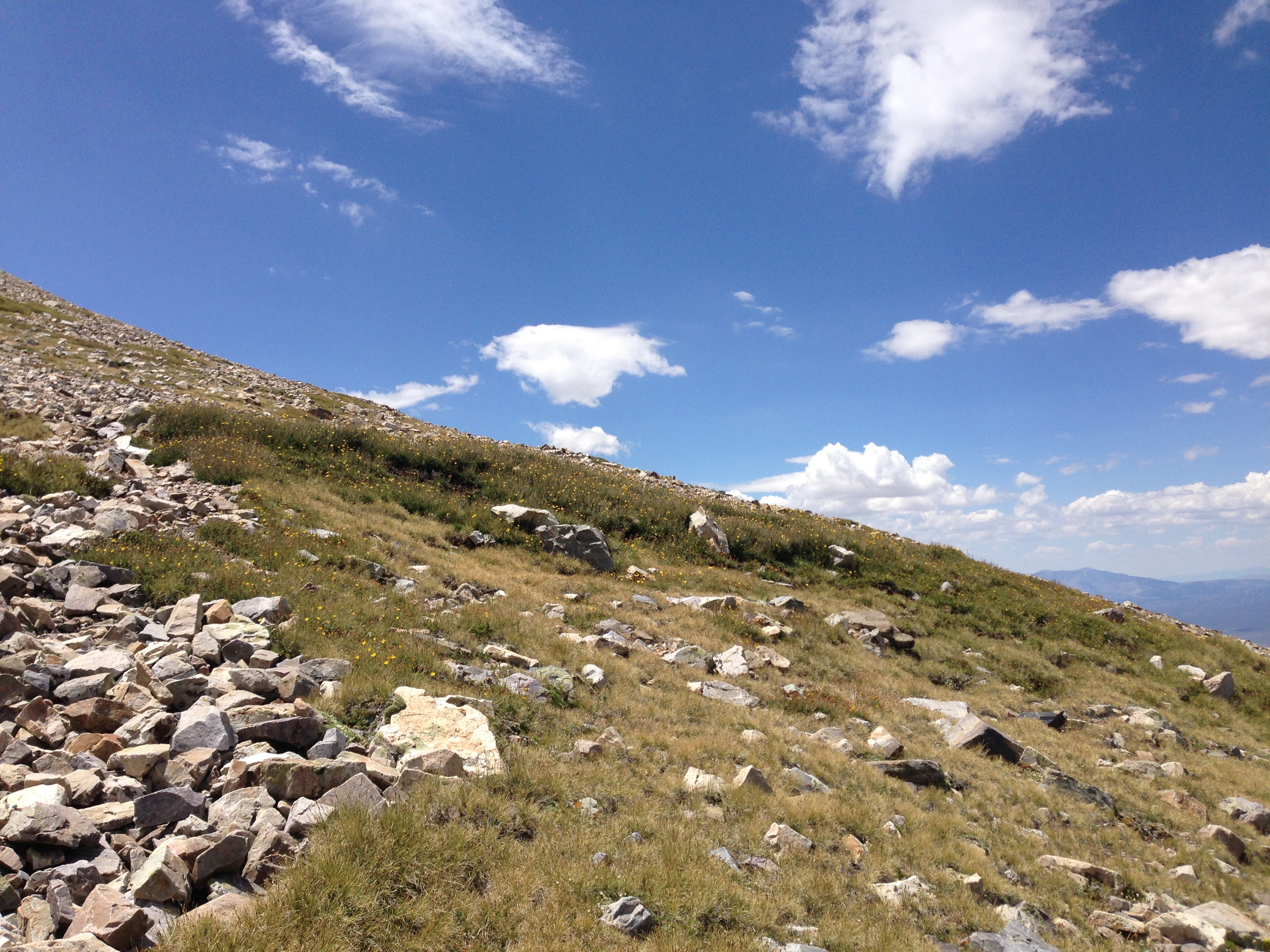
Barren alpine tundra, typical of Akher Chhish below the snow line.

The lower slopes and valleys have scattered juniper and birch trees, as well as grass and desert thornplants, grading to shorter grass and then just moss higher up.

Goats and Siberian ibex live in the high mountaintops, while snow leopards and small populations of brown and black bears live and hunt in the valleys.

== See also ==
- Karakorams
- Northern Pakistan
- Gilgit-Baltistan
- List of mountains in Pakistan
- Tirich Mir
- Noshaq
