= Koh-i-Murdar =

Mountain in Pakistan

Coordinates: 30°46′N 67°10′E

Highest point
- Elevation: 3,184 m (10,446 ft)

Geography
- Location: Pakistan
- Parent range: Sulaiman Mountains

Koh-i-Murdar (Urdu: مردار پہاڑ; Balochi: کوہٖ‌ مردار) is a 3,184 metres (10,446 ft) high mountain peak located in the Sulaiman Mountain Range, in the east of Quetta District, in western Pakistan.

== See also ==
- List of mountains in Pakistan
- Mountain ranges of Pakistan
