= Ilford Peak =

Mountain in Pakistan

- Location within Pakistan

Highest point
- Elevation: 6,080 m (19,950 ft)
- Coordinates: 35°20′40.8″N 76°29′23.7″E

Geography
- Location: Pakistan
- Parent range: Karakoram

Climbing
- First ascent: 2019 by Markevich Konstantin, Sushko Denis and Anton Ivanov

Ilford Peak (Hasho Peak II) is a peak located on the watershed of the Nangmah, Khane and Lachit valleys, Pakistan. The mountain, located in the Karakoram mountain range, is 6080 meters high. It was first climbed on July 23, 2019 by a group of Russian climbers Markevich Konstantin, Sushko Denis and Anton Ivanov.

== See also ==
- List of mountains in Pakistan
