= Shayaz =

- Location within Pakistan Location within Khyber Pakhtunkhwa

Highest point
- Elevation: 6,026 m (19,770 ft)
- Prominence: 1,797 m (5,896 ft)
- Listing: Ultra
- Coordinates: 36°38′54″N 72°49′42″E

Geography
- Location: Khyber Pakhtunkhwa, Pakistan
- Parent range: Hindu Kush

Shayaz is a mountain in the Hindu Kush mountain range of Asia. Located in Khyber Pakhtunkhwa, Pakistan, it has a summit elevation of 6,026 m above sea level.

== See also ==
- List of mountains in Pakistan
- List of ultras of the Western Himalayas
