= List of mountains in Pakistan =

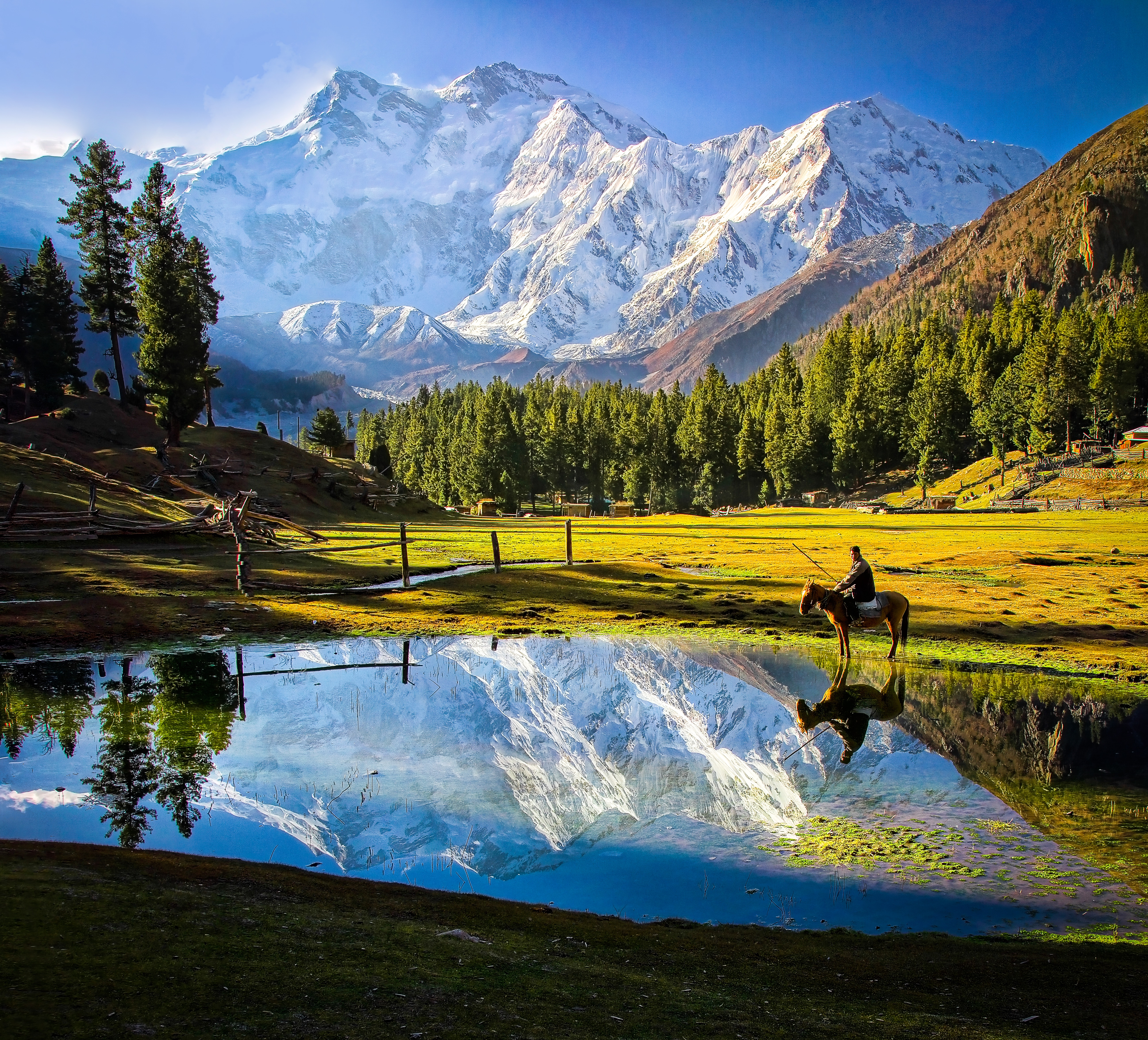
Nanga Parbat, the 9th highest in the world

Pakistan is home to 108 peaks above 7,000 metres and 4555 above 6,000 m. There is no count of the peaks above 5,000 and 4,000 m. Five of the 14 highest independent peaks in the world (the eight-thousanders) are in Pakistan (four of which lie in the surroundings of Concordia, the confluence of Baltoro Glacier and Godwin Austen Glacier). Most of the highest peaks in Pakistan lie in the Karakoram mountain range (which lies almost entirely in the Gilgit–Baltistan region of Pakistan, and is considered to be a separate range from Himalayan range) but some peaks above 7,000 m are included in the Himalayan and Hindu Kush ranges. Moreover, Pakistan is home to over 7,000 glaciers, more than anywhere except the polar regions.

== Considerations ==
The list is an incomplete list of mountains in Pakistan. There are many named and unnamed peaks in Pakistan that are currently not included in this list. The list also includes many peaks that are not usually classed as independent mountains, but instead are considered sub-peaks of other mountains, due to having low topographic prominence (the height of a peak above the highest saddle connecting it to a higher summit). Also, many of the elevations listed are approximate, due to imprecise and inconsistent surveys. The ranks in the peaks above 7,000 metres (23,000 ft) are derived from the list of highest mountains.

The dividing line between a mountain with multiple peaks and separate mountains is not always clear (see Highest unclimbed mountain). A common threshold is to define a mountain as a summit with 300 m prominence (1,000 ft; also 10 traditional rope lengths). Alternatively, a relative prominence (prominence or height) is used (usually 7–8%) to reflect that in higher mountain ranges everything is on a larger scale. The list of highest mountains ranks the highest 100 summits with at least 500 m prominence, approximating a 7% relative prominence. A drawback of a prominence-based list is that it may exclude peaks commonly thought of as mountains that are connected via a high ridge to a taller summit. Many such peaks and mountains with less than sufficient prominence are included but not numbered in the list.

It is very unlikely that all the heights given are correct to the nearest meter; indeed, problems of definition of sea level can arise when a mountain is remote from the sea. Different sources often differ by many meters, and many mountains in the Karakorum differ by over 100 metres on different maps. These discrepancies serve to emphasise the uncertainties in the listed heights.

== Geographical distribution ==
Most of the highest mountains in Pakistan are located in the Karakoram range, some high mountains are in Himalaya (the highest of which is Nanga Parbat, globally ranked 9th, 8126 m) and Hindu Kush (the highest of which is Tirich Mir, globally ranked 33rd, 7708 m).

The locations of the highest mountains are shown on the composite satellite image of Karakoram and Hindu Kush below. The numbers refer to the global ranking in this "List of highest mountains". For clarity, lower peaks with labels overlapping higher peaks are left out of the main image.

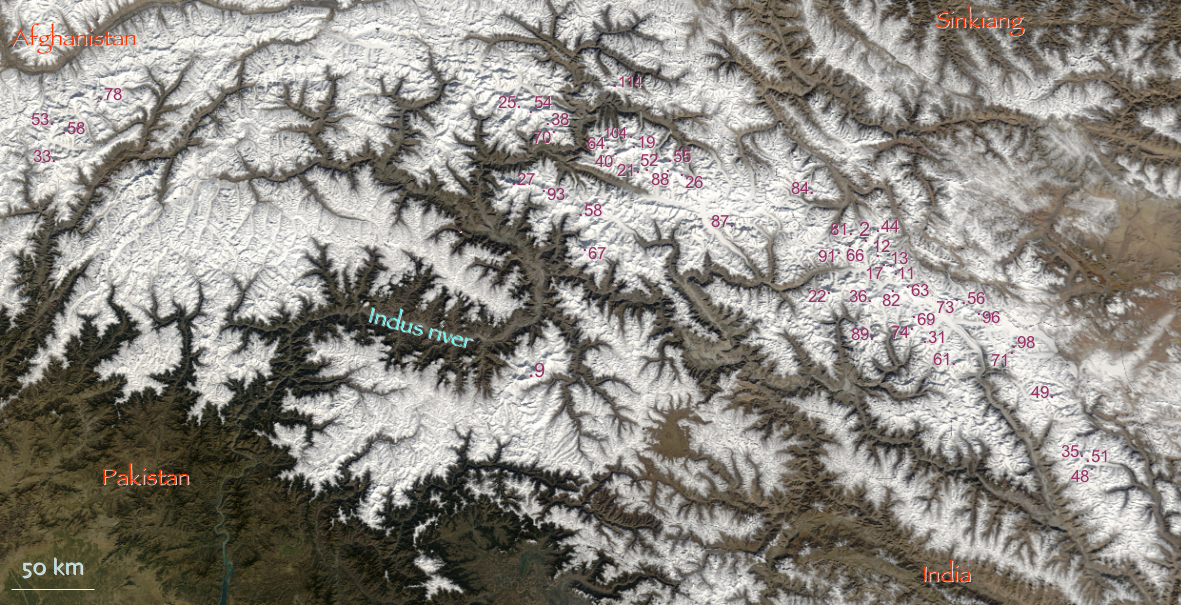
Location of peaks in Hindu Kush and Karakoram, ranked globally as in the list

Most of the high peaks in Pakistan lie specifically in Gilgit–Baltistan with the exception of a few 7,000+ m peaks in the high Hindu Kush (the peaks marked in the northwest most region of Pakistan).

The peak marked as number 9 is Nanga Parbat (8,125 m), which is the 2nd highest Himalayan peak in Pakistan. All other peaks above 8,000m are in the Baltoro Muztagh subrange of Karakoram.

== 8000+ meters ==
| Rank (Pakistan) | World Rank | Name | Elevation | Prominence | Mountain Range | Photo |
|---|---|---|---|---|---|---|
| 1 | 2 | K2 (Chhogori) | 8,611 metres (28,251 ft) | 4,020 metres (13,190 ft) | Karakoram | |
| 2 | 9 | Nanga Parbat | 8,126 metres (26,660 ft) | 4,608 metres (15,118 ft) | Himalaya | |
| 3 | 11 | Gasherbrum I (K5) | 8,080 metres (26,510 ft) | 2,155 metres (7,070 ft) | Karakoram | |
| 4 | 12 | Broad Peak | 8,051 metres (26,414 ft) | 1,701 metres (5,581 ft) | Karakoram | |
| 5 | 13 | Gasherbrum II (K4) | 8,035 metres (26,362 ft) | 1,524 metres (5,000 ft) | Karakoram | |

== 7000 to 8000 meters ==
| World Rank | Rank (Pakistan) | Name | Height (m) | Location | Sub-Range |
|---|---|---|---|---|---|
| | | Gasherbrum III (K3a) | 7,952 m | Karakoram | Baltoro Muztagh |
| 17 | 6 | Gasherbrum IV (K3) | 7,925 m | Karakoram | Baltoro Muztagh |
| 19 | 7 | Distaghil Sar | 7,885 m | Karakoram | Shimshal |
| 21 | 8 | Kunyang Chhish | 7,852 m | Karakoram | Shimshal |
| 22 | 9 | Masherbrum (K1) | 7,821 m | Karakoram | Masherbrum Mountains |
| 25 | 10 | Batura I | 7,795 m | Karakoram | Batura Muztagh |
| 26 | 11 | Kanjut Sar | 7,790 m | Karakoram | Shimshal |
| 27 | 12 | Rakaposhi | 7,788 m | Karakoram | Rakaposhi-Haramosh Mountains |
| | | Batura II | 7,762 m | Karakoram | Batura Muztagh |
| 31 | 13 | Saltoro Kangri | 7,742 m | Karakoram | Saltoro Mountains |
| | | Batura III | 7,729 m | Karakoram | Batura Muztagh |
| 33 | 14 | Tirich Mir | 7,708 m | Hindu Kush | |
| 36 | 15 | Chogolisa I | 7,665 m | Karakoram | Masherbrum u |
| 38 | 16 | Shispare | 7,611 m | Karakoram | Batura Muztagh |
| | | Silberzacken | 7,597 m | Himalaya | Nanga Parbat |
| | | Batura IV | 7,594 m | Karakoram | Batura Muztagh |
| | | Unnamed | 7,581 m | Karakoram | |
| 39 | 17 | Trivor | 7,577 m | Karakoram | Shimshal |
| 43 | 18 | Skyang Kangri | 7,545 m | Karakoram | Baltoro Muztagh |
| 44 | 19 | Yukshin Gardan Sar | 7,530 m | | Shimshal |
| 52 | 20 | Noshaq | 7,492 m | Hindu Kush | |
| 53 | 21 | Pumari Chhish (W) | 7,492 m | Karakoram | Shimshal |
| 54 | 22 | Passu Sar | 7,476 m | Karakoram | Batura Muztagh |
| 58 | 23 | Malubiting (W) | 7,458 m | Karakoram | Rakaposhi-Haramosh Mountains |
| | | Muchu Chhish | 7,453 m | Karakoram | Batura Muztagh |
| 61 | 24 | K12 | 7,428 m | Karakoram | Saltoro Mountains |
| 63 | 25 | Sia Kangri | 7,422 m | Karakoram | Baltoro Muztagh |
| 64 | 26 | Momhil Sar | 7,343 m | Karakoram | Shimshal |
| 66 | 27 | Skil Brum | 7,420 m | Karakoram | Baltoro Muztagh |
| 67 | 28 | Haramosh | 7,409 m | Karakoram | Rakaposhi-Haramosh Mountains |
| 68 | 29 | Istor-o-Nal | 7,403 m | Karakoram | Hindu Kush |
| 69 | 30 | Ghent Kangri | 7,400 m | Karakoram | Saltoro Mountains |
| 70 | 31 | Ultar Sar | 7,388 m | Karakoram | Batura Muztagh |
| 74 | 32 | Sherpi Kangri | 7,380 m | Karakoram | Saltoro Mountains |
| 77 | 33 | Saraghrar | 7,349 m | Karakoram | Hindu Kush |
| 81 | 34 | Baltoro Kangri | 7,280 m | Karakoram | Masherbrum Mountains |
| | | Jutmo Sar | 7,330 m | Karakoram | |
| | | Bojohagur Duanasir I | 7,329 m | Karakoram | Batura Muztagh |
| | | Yazghil | 7,324 m | Karakoram | Shimshal |
| | | Unnamed | 7,300 m | Karakoram | |
| | | Passu Diar | 7,295 m | Karakoram | Batura Muztagh |
| | | Unnamed | 7,295 m | Karakoram | |
| | | Malubiting C | 7,291 m | Karakoram | |
| 86 | 35 | Baintha Brakk (The Ogre) | 7,285 m | Karakoram | Panmah Muztagh |
| 87 | 36 | Yutmaru Sar | 7,283 m | Karakoram | Hispar |
| 88 | 37 | Baltistan Peak (K6) | 7,282 m | Karakoram | Masherbrum Mountains |
| | | Unnamed | 7,280 m | Karakoram | |
| 90 | 38 | Muztagh Tower | 7,273 m | Karakoram | Baltoro Muztagh |
| 92 | 39 | Diran | 7,266 m | Karakoram | Rakaposhi-Bagrote Mountains |
| 103 | 40 | Malungutti Sar (Mulungutti) | 7,207 m | Karakoram | Shimshal |
| 108 | 41 | Lupghar Sar (Central) | 7,200 m | Karakoram | Shimshal |
| | | Hachindar Chhish | 7,163 m | Karakoram | Karakoram |
| | | Snow Dome | 7,160 m | Karakoram | Baltoro Muztagh |
| | | Praqpa Ri | 7,156 m | Karakoram | Baltoro Muztagh |
| | | Latok I | 7,151 m | Karakoram | Panmah Muztagh |
| | | Gasherbrum V | 7,147 m | Karakoram | Baltoro Muztagh |
| | | Latok II | 7,145 m | Karakoram | Panmah Muztagh |
| | | Kampire Dior | 7,143 m | Karakoram | Batura Muztagh |
| | | Unnamed | 7,133 m | Karakoram | Baltoro Muztagh |
| | | Kunyang Chhish N | 7,108 m | Karakoram | Hispar Muztagh |
| | | Udren Zom | 7,108 m | Karakoram | Hindu Kush |
| | | Ghenta Peak | 7,090 m | Karakoram | Batura Muztagh |
| | | Rakhiot Peak | 7,070 m | Himalaya | Nanga Parbat Group |
| | | Sangemarmar Sar | 7,050 m | Karakoram | Batura Muztagh |
| | | Link Sar | 7,041 m | Karakoram | Masherbrum Mountains |
| | | Spantik (Golden Peak) | 7,027 m | Karakoram | Spantik-Sosbun Mountains |
| | | Akher Chhish | 7,020 m | Hindu Kush | |
| | | Pamiri Sar | 7,016 m | Karakoram | |
| | | Rakaposhi East | 7,010 m | Karakoram | |
| | | Mohsin Mir | 7,004 m | Karakoram | Baltoro Muztagh |

== 6000 to 7000 meters ==
| Name | Height (m) | Location | |
|---|---|---|---|
| Laila Peak | 6,986 m | Karakoram | Haramosh Valley, Chogurunma Glacier |
| Karun Kuh | 6,977 m | Karakoram | Shimshal |
| K7 | 6,934 m | Karakoram | Hushe Valley |
| Beka Brakai Chhok | 6,882 m | Karakoram | |
| Vigne Peak | 6,874 m | Karakoram | |
| Koyo Zom | 6,871 m | Hindu Raj | Pechus Glacier |
| Dut Sar | 6,858 m | Karakoram | Shimshal |
| Angel Sar | 6,858 m | Karakoram | K2 and Concordia |
| Latok III | 6,850 m | Karakoram | |
| Chongra Peak | 6,830 m | Himalaya | Nanga Parbat |
| Miar Peak | 6,824 m | Karakoram | |
| Rhuparash | 6,785 m | Karakoram | |
| Biarchedi | 6,781 m | Karakoram | Baltoro Glacier |
| Seiri Porkush | 6,771 m | Karakoram | Batura Glacier |
| Choricho | 6,756 m | Karakoram | |
| Biale Peak | 6,729 m | Karakoram | |
| Trinity Peak | 6,700 m | Karakoram | |
| Mani Peak | 6,685 m | Karakoram | |
| Haramosh II | 6,666 m | Karakoram | |
| Thui I | 6,660 m | Hindu Raj | Ponarillo Glacier |
| Gul Lasht Zom | 6,657 m | Hindu Raj | Lutkho Valley |
| Paiju Peak | 6,610 m | Karakoram | |
| Makrong Chhish | 6,607 m | Karakoram | |
| Ganalo Peak | 6,606 m | Himalaya | Nanga Parbat |
| Phuparash Peak | 6,574 m | Karakoram | |
| Buni Zom | 6550 | Hindu Raj | Booni, Chitral |
| Thui II | 6523 | Hindu Raj | Shetor Glacier, Thui Pass |
| Ghamubar I | 6518 | Hindu Raj | Ghamu Bar Glacier |
| Noukarsich | 6496 | Karakoram | Hunza Valley |
| Honbrok | 6459 | Karakoram | Hushe Valley |
| Ghamubar II | 6432 | Hindu Raj | Ghamubar Glacier |
| Uli Biaho | 6417 | Karakoram | _ Youno Shigar |
| Koser Gunge | 6401 | Karakoram | _ Youno Shigar |
| Trango Towers | 6363 | Karakoram | Baltoro Muztagh |
| Sarwali Peak | 6326 | Karakoram | Azad Jammu and Kashmir and Rupal Valleys |
| Namika Peak | 6325 | Karakoram | Hushe and Shyok Valleys |
| Urdukas I | 6320 | Karakoram | Baltoro Glacier |
| Sonia Peak | 6310 | Karakoram | Shimshal |
| Shimshal Whitehorn (odver sar) | 6303 | Karakoram | Shimshal |
| Bullah | 6294 | Karakoram | Braldu River Valley |
| Purian Sar | 6293 | Karakoram | Shimshal |
| Mango Gusor | 6288 | Karakoram | Braldu River Valley |
| Gama Sokha Lumbu | 6282 | Karakoram | Braldu River Valley |
| Urdukas II | 6280 | Karakoram | Baltoro Glacier |
| Hunza Peak | 6270 | Karakoram | Hunza Valley |
| Marble Peak | 6256 | Karakoram | Baltoro Glacier and Concordia |
| Crystal Peak | 6252 | Karakoram | Baltoro Glacier and Concordia |
| Ghuchhar Sar | 6249 | Hindu Kush | |
| Garmush | 6244 | Hindu Kush | Garmush Glacier, Darkot |
| Lobsang | 6225 | Karakoram | Baltoro Glacier |
| Blatts Yaz | 6191 | Hindu Kush | Ghamubar Glacier, Darkot |
| Yawash Sar II | 6176 | Karakoram | Shimshal |
| Thui Zom | 6158 | Hindu Kush | Ghamubar Glacier, Darkot |
| Bilchar Dubani | 6134 | Karakoram | Bagrot Valley |
| Urdukas III | 6130 | Karakoram | Baltoro Glacier |
| Chikar Zom | 6110 | Hindu Raj | Chatebori Glacier |
| Uli Biaho Tower | 6109 | Karakoram | Braldu River Valley |
| Tupopdan | 6106 | Karakoram | Boiber Valley |
| Laila Peak | 6096 | Karakoram | Gondogoro Glacier, Hushe Valley |
| Darmyani | 6090 | Karakoram | |
| Ilford Peak | 6080 | Karakoram | Khane Valley |
| Minglik Sar | 6050 | Karakoram | Shimshal |
| Balti Peak | 6050 | Karakorum | |
| Walyoo Sar | 6030 | Karakoram | Shimshal |
| Jurjur Khona Sar | 6029 | Karakoram | Hunza Valley |
| Shayaz | 6026 | Hindu Raj | |
| Mitre Peak | 6025 | Karakoram | Baltoro Muztagh, Concordia |
| Chaskin Sar | 6000 | Karakoram | Shimshal |
| Sher Peak | 6000 | Karakoram | Shimshal |
| Bublimating (Ladyfinger) | 6000 | Karakoram | Ultar Peak, Hunza Valley |

== 5000 to 6000 meters ==
| Name | Height (m) | Location | |
|---|---|---|---|
| Laila Peak | 5971 | Himalaya | Rupal Valley |
| Falak Sar | 5957 | | Swat Valley |
| Dofana Peak | 5940 | Himalaya | Rondu(Youlbu Valley) Baltistan |
| Urdukas IV | 5900 | Karakoram | Baltoro Glacier |
| Shani Peak | 5887 | Karakoram | Naltar, Shani Glacier |
| Chari Khand | 5886 | Karakoram | Naltar Valley |
| Quz Sar (Kuz Sar Peak) | 5854 | Karakoram | Shimshal |
| Cathedral Peak | 5828 | Karakoram | Baltoro Glacier |
| Khimor Peak | 5811 | Karakoram | Misgar |
| Qool Peak | 5800 | Karakoram | Shimshal |
| Khaltar Peak | 5798 | Karakoram | Naltar Valley |
| Bat Koshi | 5791 | Karakoram | Baltar Glacier, Hunza |
| Jurjurkhana Sar | 5790 | Karakoram | Shimshal |
| Trident Peak (Pakistan) | 5780 | Karakoram | Khane Valley |
| Mankial | 5726 | Hindu Kush | Swat Valley |
| Lobsang Spire | 5707 | Karakoram | Baltoro Glacier |
| Twin Peaks South | 5700 | Karakoram | Pakora Pass |
| Shaigiri | 5688 | Himalaya | Rupal Valley |
| Borit Sar | 5640 | Karakoram | Batura Glacier, Gojal |
| Mehrbani Peak | 5639 | Karakoram | Chaprot Pass |
| Buldar Peak | 5602 | Himalaya | Nanga Parbat |
| Liligo | 5600 | Karakoram | Baltoro Glacier |
| Shinlep Bluk | 5517 | Karakoram | Braldu River Valley |
| Khiatar Peak | 5454 | Karakoram | Naltar Valley |
| Kirilgoz | 5450 | Karakoram | Batura Glacier |
| Godeli Peak | 5325 | Karakoram | Bagrot-Haramosh Valleys |
| Malika Parbat | 5290 | Himalaya | Kaghan Valley |
| Jalipur Peak South | 5215 | Himalaya | Nanga Parbat |
| Shiftkin Sar | 5200 | Karakoram | Shimshal |
| Atabad | 5180 | Karakoram | Hunza Valley |
| Rush Pari Peak | 5098 | Karakoram | Nagar Valley |
| Ditchil | 5084 | Himalaya | Deosai |
| Tusserpo La | 5084 | Karakoram | Hushe Valley and Shyok Valleys |
| Khas Kamur | 5048 | Karakoram | Naltar Valley |
| Snow Dome | 5029 | Karakoram | Chaprot Pass |
| Sasai Khand | 5001 | Karakoram | Naltar Valley |

== 4000 to 5000 meters ==
| Name | Height (m) | Location | | |
|---|---|---|---|---|
| Gunshar | 4950 | | Indus Kohistan | |
| Chattewala | 4917 | Himalaya | | |
| Bulan | 4913 | Karakoram | Nanga Parbat | |
| Kurkun | 4890 | Hindu Kush | | |
| Churko Peak | 4800 | Himalaya | Siren Valley, Mansehra | |
| Mount Sikaram | 4761 | Safed Koh | Hindu Kush | Parachinar |
| Haraj | 4730 | Karakoram | Upper Nagar | |
| Marpo Chungi | 4695 | Karakoram | Shigar Valley | |
| Naltar Peak | 4678 | Karakoram | Naltar Valley | |
| Thalle La | 4572 | Karakoram | Hushe, Shyok Valley | |
| Patundas | 4570 | Karakoram | Batura Glacier | |
| Busper Peak | 4564 | Karakoram | Braldu River Valley | |
| Hachindar | 4544 | Karakoram | Hunza Valley | |
| Jabardar | 4511 | Himalaya | Fairy Meadows | Jalipur |
| Musa ka Musalla | 4500 | Himalaya | Kaghan Valley/Siran Valley | |
| Danyor Peak | 4358 | Himalaya | Karakoram | Danyor |
| Badshish | 4237 | Himalaya | Karakoram | |
| Dinewar | 4100 | | | |
| Tingrel | 4085 | | | |
| Chhugam | 4064 | Himalaya | | |

== 3000 to 4000 meters ==
| Name | Height (m) | Location | |
|---|---|---|---|
| Dwa Saray Ghar | 3700+ m | Safed Koh | Buner District |
| Elum Ghar | 3600+ m | Safed Koh | Buner District |
| Pir Ghar | 3,596m | Safed Koh | South Waziristan |
| Loe Nekan | 3,578 m | Sulaiman Mountains | Zarghoon Ghar, Quetta |
| Makra Peak | 3,885 m | Himalayas | Kaghan |
| Ganga Choti | 3,044 m | Pir Panjal | Bagh |
| Pir Kanthi | 3,321 m | Pir Panjal | Bagh |
| Loai Saar | 3,472 m | Sulaiman Mountains | Koh-i-Takatu, Quetta |
| Lwarrh Saar | 3,194 m | Sulaiman Mountains | Koh-i-Chiltan, Quetta |
| Salore Ghasha | 3,184 m | Sulaiman Mountains | Koh-i-Murdaar, Quetta |
| Takht-i-Sulaiman | 3,487 m | Sulaiman Mountains | East of Quetta |
| Sadozaitop | 3,449 m | Toba Kakar Range | East of Quetta |

== See also ==
- List of Pakistani administrative divisions by highest elevation
- Gilgit-Baltistan
- List of highest mountains on Earth
- List of mountain ranges of Pakistan
- List of mountain ranges of the world
- Lists of mountains by region

== Notes ==
1. Stated in the Pakistan Trekking Guide, by Isobel and Ben Shaw (along with the list of highest peaks of Pakistan in Appendices).
2. These ranks are derived from the List of highest mountains. Many peaks and mountains with less than sufficient prominence are included but not numbered in the list (see #Considerations.
3. The elevation of Hachindar Chhish given here is disputed by both Austrian and Russian topographic mapping, which give it 6870 m and 6765 m respectively.

== Sources ==
- Neate, Jill (1989). High Asia: An Illustrated History of the 7000 Metre Peaks. Seattle: The Mountaineers. ISBN 0-89886-238-8.
- Soviet military 1:100,000 topographic maps (most from 1980–1981)
- The "High Mountain Info" section of the "High Mountain Sports Magazine" (1990–2005) (now Climb Magazine)
