= Skyang Kangri =

Mountain in Pakistan and China

- سکیانگ کنگری
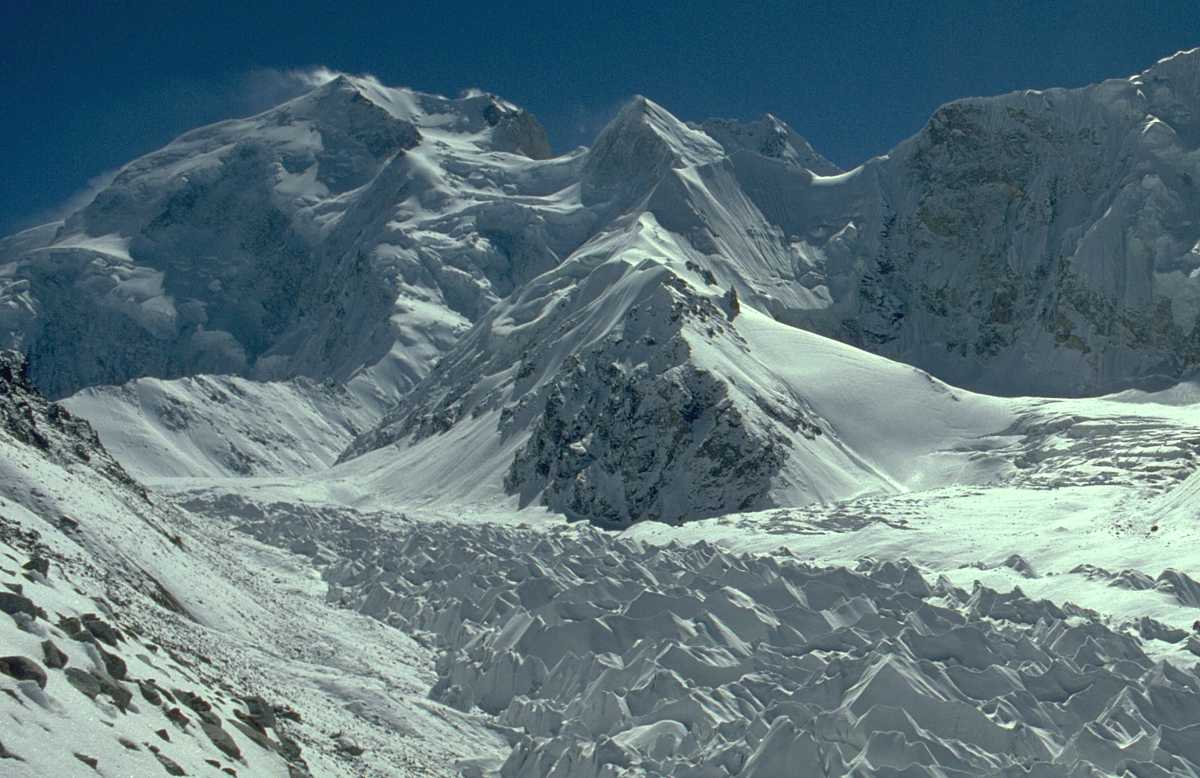
- Skyang Kangri seen from K2 glacier

Highest point
- Elevation: 7,545 m (24,754 ft); Ranked 43rd
- Prominence: 1,085 m (3,560 ft)
- Listing: Mountains of Pakistan
- Coordinates: 35°55′35″N 76°34′03″E

Geography
- Location within Karakoram Location within Gilgit Baltistan Location within Southern Xinjiang
- The major peaks in Karakoram are rank identified by height. Legend: 1：K2; 2：Gasherbrum I, K5; 3：Broad Peak; 4：Gasherbrum II, K4; 5：Gasherbrum III, K3a; 6：Gasherbrum IV, K3; 7：Distaghil Sar; 8：Kunyang Chhish; 9：Masherbrum, K1; 10：Batura Sar, Batura I; 11：Rakaposhi; 12：Batura II; 13：Kanjut Sar; 14：Saltoro Kangri, K10; 15：Batura III; 16： Saser Kangri I, K22; 17：Chogolisa; 18：Shispare; 19：Trivor Sar; 20：Skyang Kangri; 21：Mamostong Kangri, K35; 22：Saser Kangri II; 23：Saser Kangri III; 24：Pumari Chhish; 25：Passu Sar; 26：Yukshin Gardan Sar; 27：Teram Kangri I; 28：Malubiting; 29：K12; 30：Sia Kangri; 31：Momhil Sar; 32：Skil Brum; 33：Haramosh Peak; 34：Ghent Kangri; 35：Ultar Sar; 36：Rimo Massif; 37：Sherpi Kangri; 38：Yazghil Dome South; 39：Baltoro Kangri; 40：Crown Peak; 41：Baintha Brakk; 42：Yutmaru Sar; 43：K6; 44：Muztagh Tower; 45：Diran; 46：Apsarasas Kangri I; 47：Rimo III; 48：Gasherbrum V
- Location: Baltistan, Gilgit–Baltistan, Pakistan; Tashkurgan, Xinjiang, China, China–Pakistan border
- Parent range: Baltoro Muztagh, Karakoram

Climbing
- First ascent: August 11, 1976 by Yoshioki Fujioji, Hideki Nagata (Japanese)
- Easiest route: East Ridge: glacier/snow/ice climb

Skyang Kangri
- Simplified Chinese: 斯坎格里峰
Transcriptions

Skyang Kangri (Urdu: سکیانگ کنگری), or Staircase Peak, is a high mountain peak of the Baltoro Muztagh, a subrange of the Karakoram range. It lies on the Pakistan–China border, about 7 kilometres (4.3 mi) northeast of K2, the world's second-highest mountain. The name "Staircase Peak" refers to the East Ridge, which resembles a giant staircase with five steps.

== Geology ==
As can be determined from limited exposures, the summit, northern, and northeast slopes of Skyang Kangri consist predominantly of limestones of the Shaksgam formation that are largely covered by ice. Further south and west, exposures of K2 Gneiss occur between it and Skyang Luungpa Glacier where the K2 Gneiss is in fault contact with highly folded and faulted strata of the Shaksgam and Baltoro formations. The lower southeast flank of Skyang Kangri consists of a strip of black slate of the Baltoro formation that underlies the Shaksgam Formation and is in fault contact with main body of K2 Gneiss that comprises K2.

The Shaksgam Formation consists of massive, brown-grey, shallow-marine, shelf limestones. These limestones contain occasional interbeds of brown and yellowish sandstone and light-colored marl. They are weakly metamorphosed and highly fossiliferous. They contain an abundance of Permian fossils that include brachiopods (Productus sp.) lamellibranchs, bryozoans, corals, crinoids and foraminifera (Parafusulina sp.). The thickness of the Shaksgam Formation is not less than 1,000 meters (3,300 ft).

The Baltoro Formation consists of thin-bedded black, foliated shales often grading into black slates. The slates are highly cleaved and metamorphosed as high as lower greenschist facies. Interlayered with the slates are thin beds of dark coloured limestone and sandstone. These strata are unfossiliferous and presumed on the basis of their stratigraphic position to date to the Carboniferous Period. The slates of the Baltoro Formation is part of a thick sequence of well-cleaved black shales and slates that are exposed along almost the entire length of the Karakoram. These black shales and slates include the Singhie shales, Sarpo Laggo slate, and Pasu slates.

== Climbing history ==
Skyang Kangri was first attempted, unsuccessfully, by the party of renowned climber and explorer Luigi Amadeo di Savoia, the Duke of the Abruzzi, in 1909, during an expedition to K2. They attempted the East Ridge, as did a subsequent failed attempt in 1975, in which one climber died and one had to be evacuated by helicopter. The first ascent was made in 1976 by a Japanese expedition, climbing the East Ridge without major incident.

In 1980, American climbers Jeff Lowe and Michael Kennedy attempted the West Face of Skyang Kangri, but reached only about 7,100 m (23,200 ft); retreating after Lowe suffered altitude sickness. A Russian team reached the headwall at 7,000 m (23,000 ft) on the same route in 2008 but they aborted after a heavy snowstorm and some climbers fell ill with signs of pneumonia. According to the Himalayan Index, there have been no subsequent attempts on the mountain.

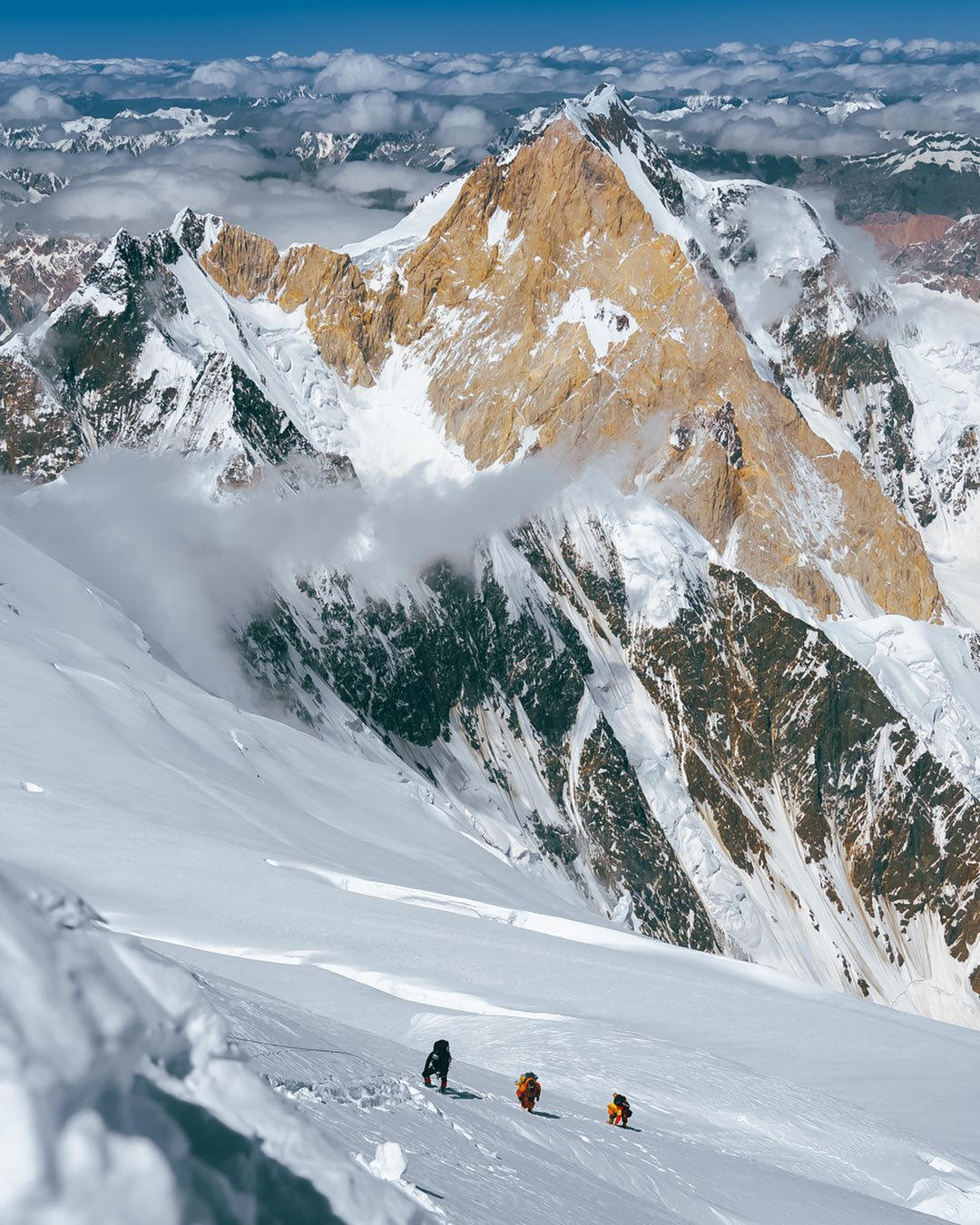
The southeast pillar and southwest face of Skyang Kangri as viewed from K2's Abruzzi Spur.

== Passes ==
Windy Gap is a 6,111-meter (20,049 ft)-high mountain pass 35.87318°N 76.57692°E at east of K2, north of Broad Peak, and south of Skyang Kangri.

== Sources ==
- Neate, Jill (1989). High Asia: An Illustrated History of the 7000 Metre Peaks. Seattle: The Mountaineers. ISBN 0-89886-238-8.
- Jerzy Wala, Orographical Sketch Map of the Karakoram, Swiss Foundation for Alpine Research, 1990.
