= Skil Brum =

Mountain in northern Pakistan

- سکل برم
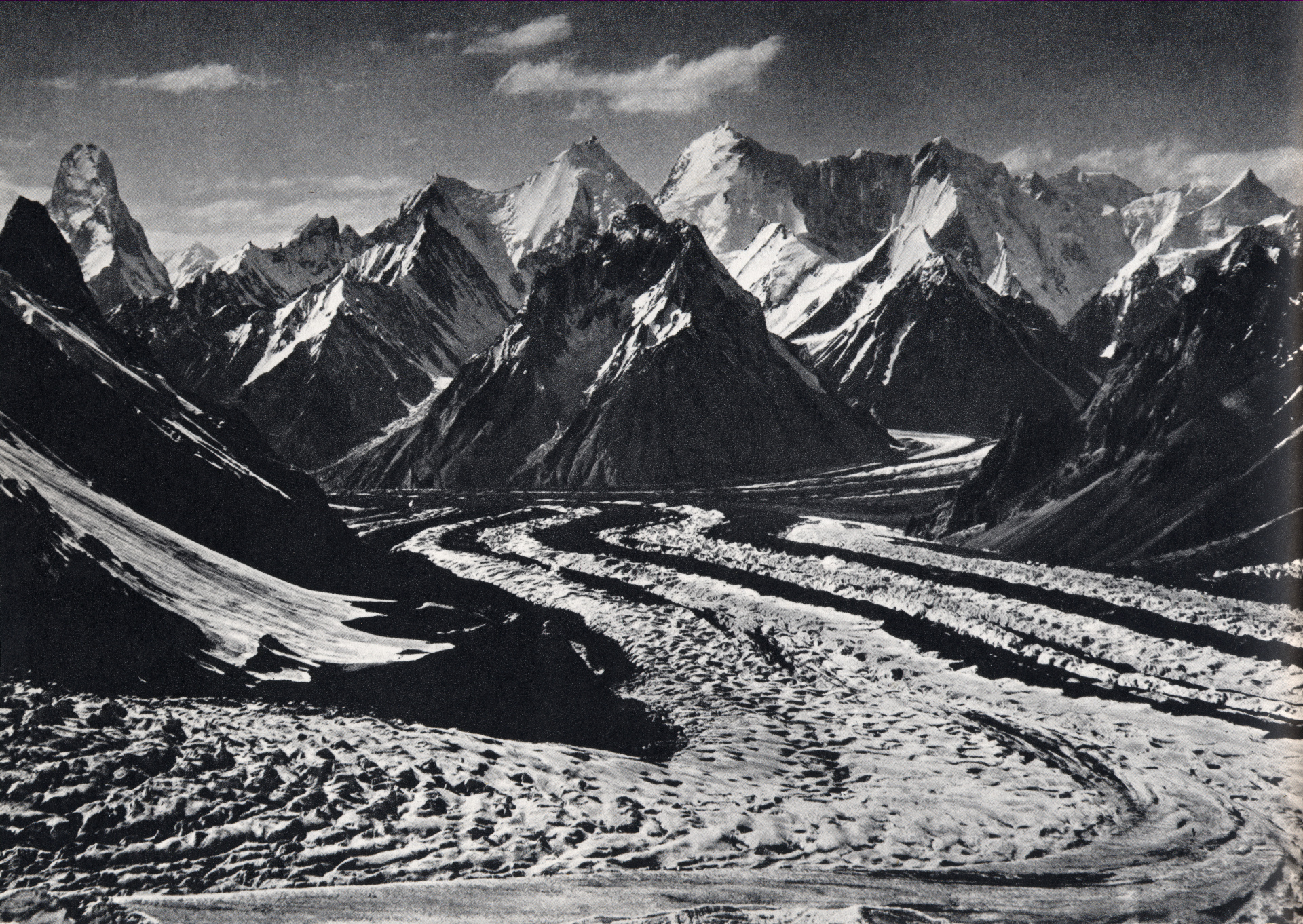
- Skil Brum (center right), 1909

Highest point
- Elevation: 7,410 m (24,310 ft); Ranked 66th
- Prominence: 1,152 m (3,780 ft)
- Listing: Mountains of Pakistan
- Coordinates: 35°51′00″N 76°25′00″E

Geography
- Location within Southern Xinjiang Location within Gilgit Baltistan
- The major peaks in Karakoram are rank identified by height. Legend: 1：K2; 2：Gasherbrum I, K5; 3：Broad Peak; 4：Gasherbrum II, K4; 5：Gasherbrum III, K3a; 6：Gasherbrum IV, K3; 7：Distaghil Sar; 8：Kunyang Chhish; 9：Masherbrum, K1; 10：Batura Sar, Batura I; 11：Rakaposhi; 12：Batura II; 13：Kanjut Sar; 14：Saltoro Kangri, K10; 15：Batura III; 16： Saser Kangri I, K22; 17：Chogolisa; 18：Shispare; 19：Trivor Sar; 20：Skyang Kangri; 21：Mamostong Kangri, K35; 22：Saser Kangri II; 23：Saser Kangri III; 24：Pumari Chhish; 25：Passu Sar; 26：Yukshin Gardan Sar; 27：Teram Kangri I; 28：Malubiting; 29：K12; 30：Sia Kangri; 31：Momhil Sar; 32：Skil Brum; 33：Haramosh Peak; 34：Ghent Kangri; 35：Ultar Sar; 36：Rimo Massif; 37：Sherpi Kangri; 38：Yazghil Dome South; 39：Baltoro Kangri; 40：Crown Peak; 41：Baintha Brakk; 42：Yutmaru Sar; 43：K6; 44：Muztagh Tower; 45：Diran; 46：Apsarasas Kangri I; 47：Rimo III; 48：Gasherbrum V
- Location: Baltistan, Gilgit–Baltistan, Pakistan; Tashkurgan, Xinjiang, China; China–Pakistan border
- Parent range: Karakoram

Climbing
- First ascent: June 19, 1957
- Easiest route: snow and ice climb

Skil Brum
- Traditional Chinese: 斯吉爾布魯木峰
Transcriptions

Skil Brum (Urdu: سکل برم), or Skilbrum, is a mountain in the Karakoram range in Gilgit–Baltistan, Pakistan, approximately 9 km (5 mi) west-southwest of K2. It lies on the western side of the Godwin-Austen Glacier, roughly opposite Broad Peak.

It is the 66th highest mountain in the world.

In June 1957, Marcus Schmuck and Fritz Wintersteller made a flash first ascent of Skil Brum, in pure alpine style. Starting from base camp of Broad Peak at 4,950 metres, they camped at 6,060 metres, made the summit the next day, then camped again at 6,060 metres, and then returned to base camp the next morning. The whole ascent, from base camp to base camp was done in 53 hours, a startlingly short time for a major Himalayan ascent in that era.

== See also ==
- List of highest mountains on Earth

== Notes and sources ==
- Summitpost.org: Skil Brum
