= Lobsang Spire =

Mountain in Pakistan

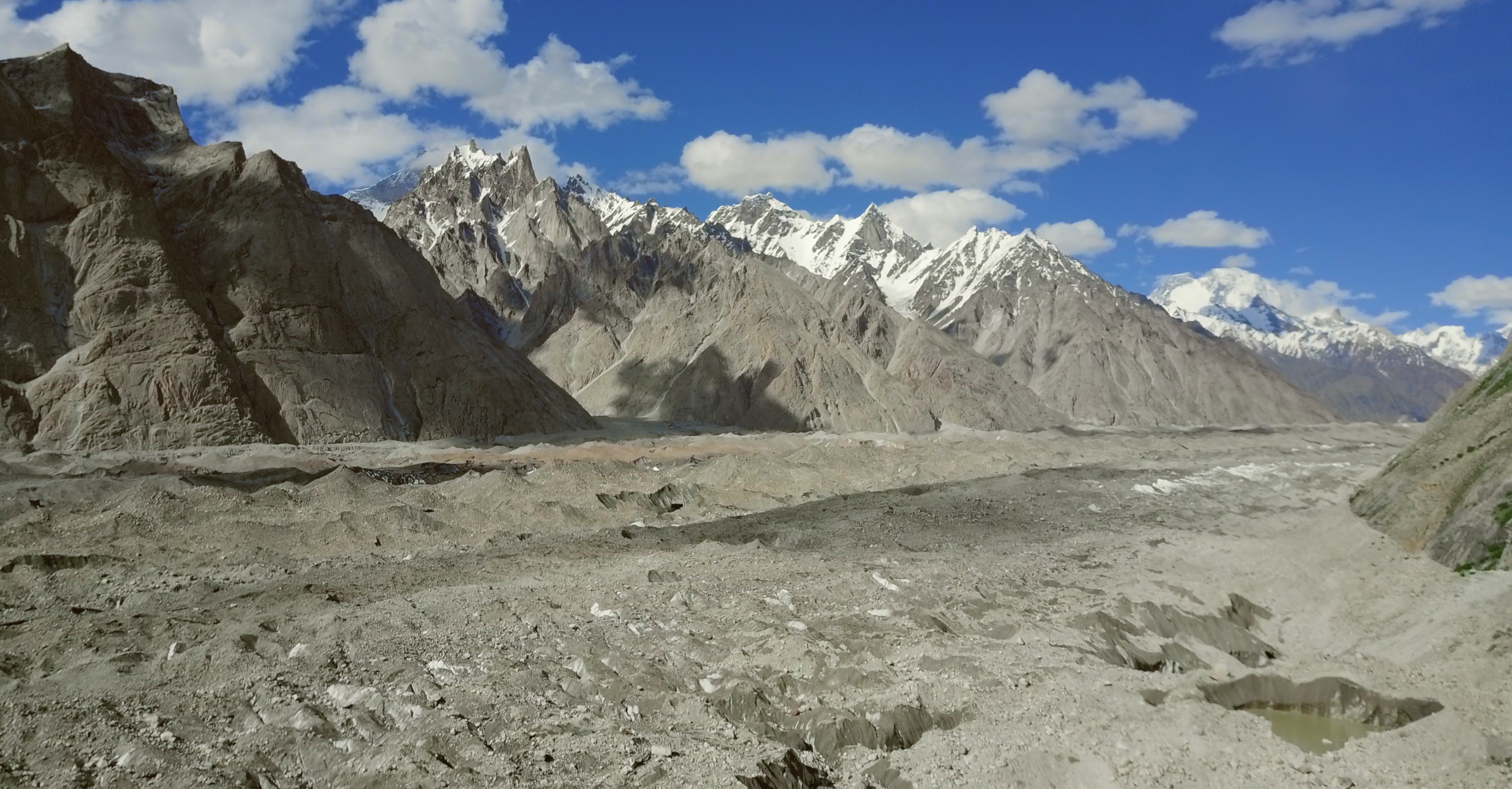
- Lobsang Spire (left) above the Baltoro Glacier, with Broad Peak in the background right

Highest point
- Elevation: 5,707 m (18,724 ft)
- Prominence: circa 290 m (1000 ft)
- Coordinates: 35°46′15″N 76°17′08″E

Geography
- Location within Pakistan
- Location: Karakoram, Pakistan
- Parent range: Karakoram Himalayas

Climbing
- First ascent: 13 June 1983 by Greg Child, Doug Scott, Peter Thexton (South Pillar)

Lobsang Spire is a mountain in the Karakoram Range of the Gilgit-Baltistan region of Pakistan. It rises above the Baltoro Glacier near Broad Peak.

== First ascent ==
Lobsang Spire was first climbed on 13 June 1983 by an expedition led by Doug Scott, with Greg Child and Peter Thexton, via the South Pillar and in alpine style. They climbed from 10 to 13 June in one of the first routes to employ big wall aid climbing techniques, including portaledges, in the Karakoram. A previous attempt by other expedition members Alan Rouse and Andy Parkin via the West ridge failed near the summit.

== Gallery ==
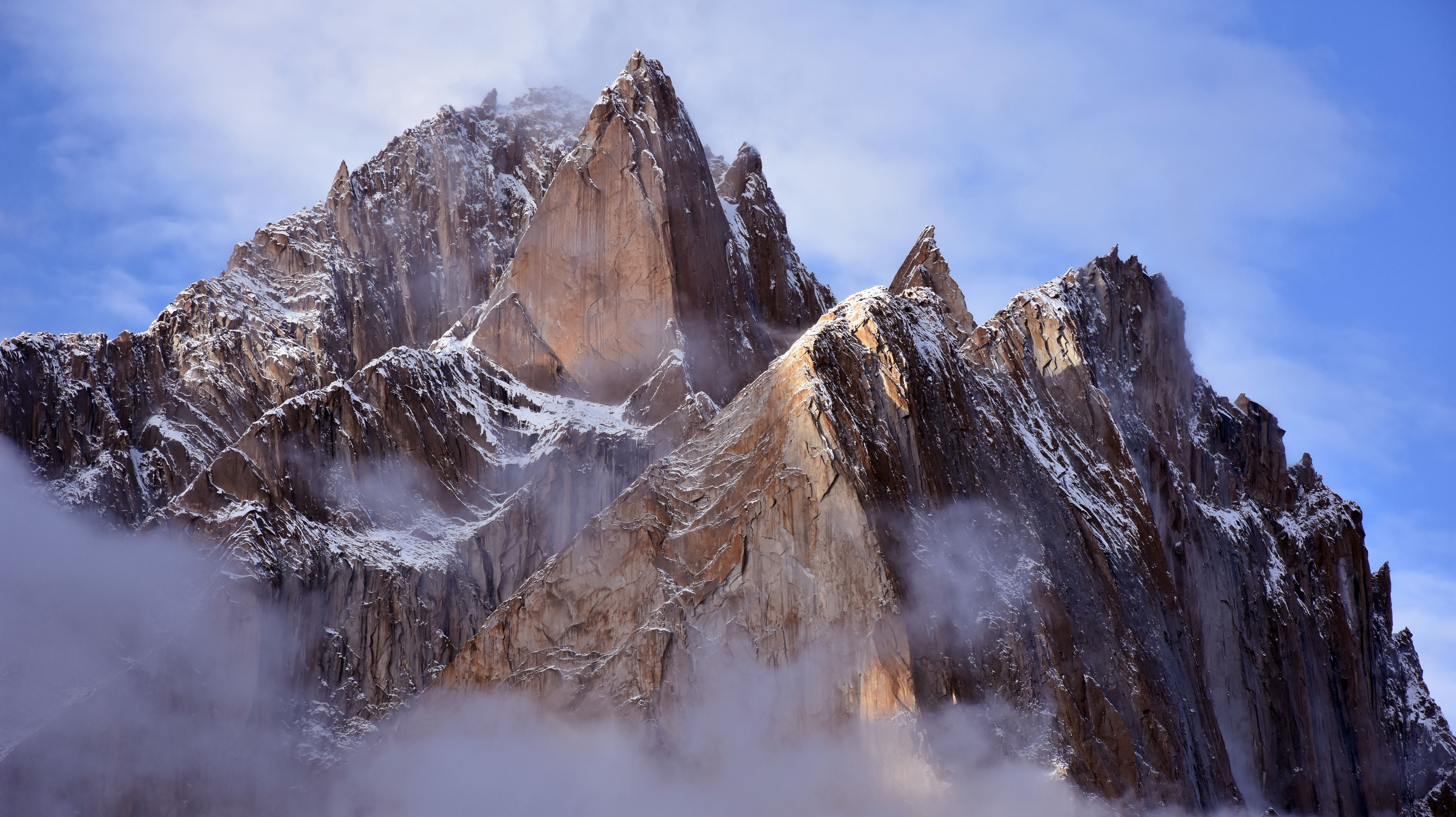
Lobsang Spire
