= Baltoro Muztagh =

Mountain range in Pakistan/China

- Chinese: 巴尔托洛慕士塔格山
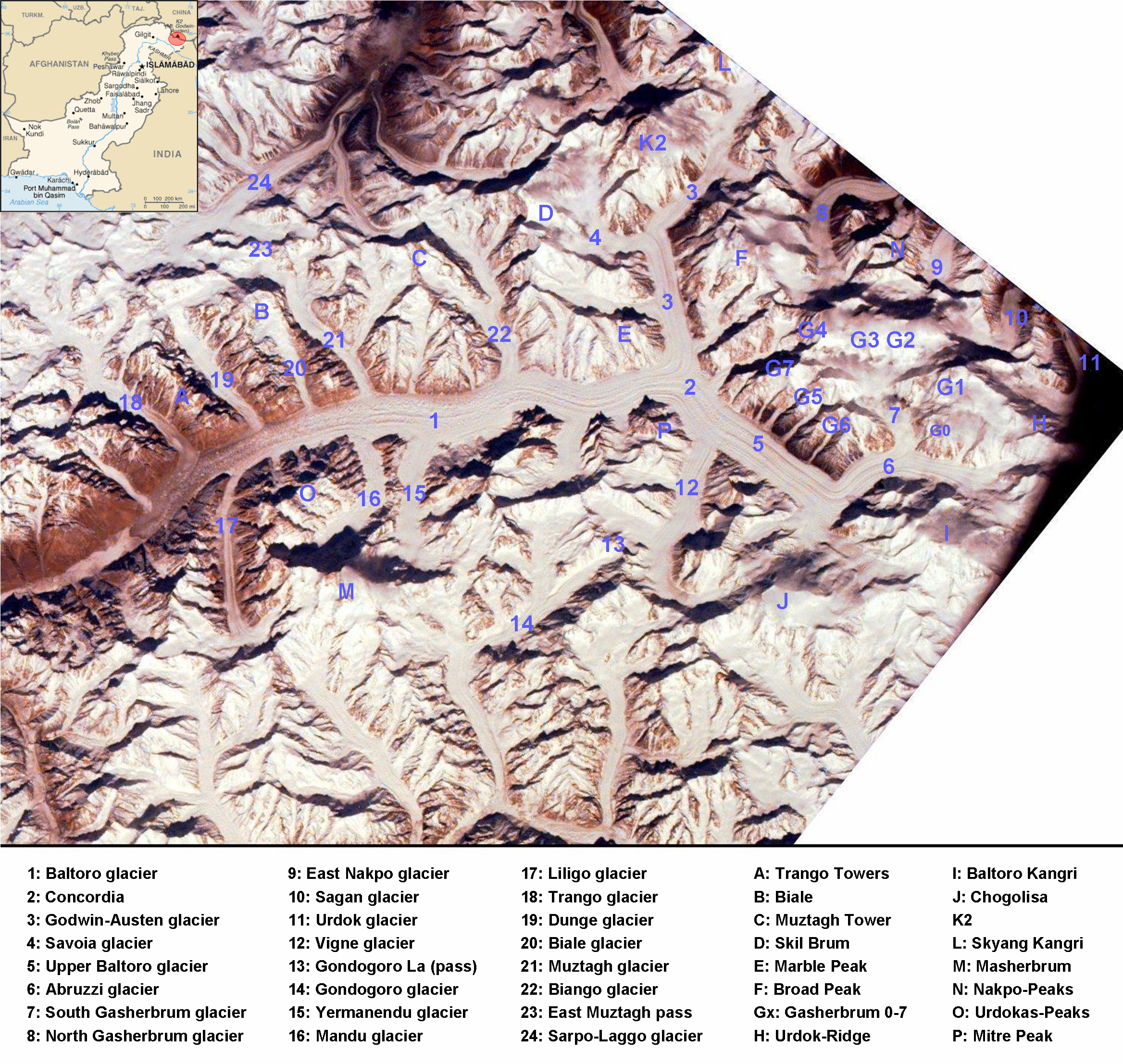

Highest point
- Peak: K2
- Elevation: 8,611 metres (28,251 ft)
- Coordinates: 35°52′57″N 76°30′48″E

Geography
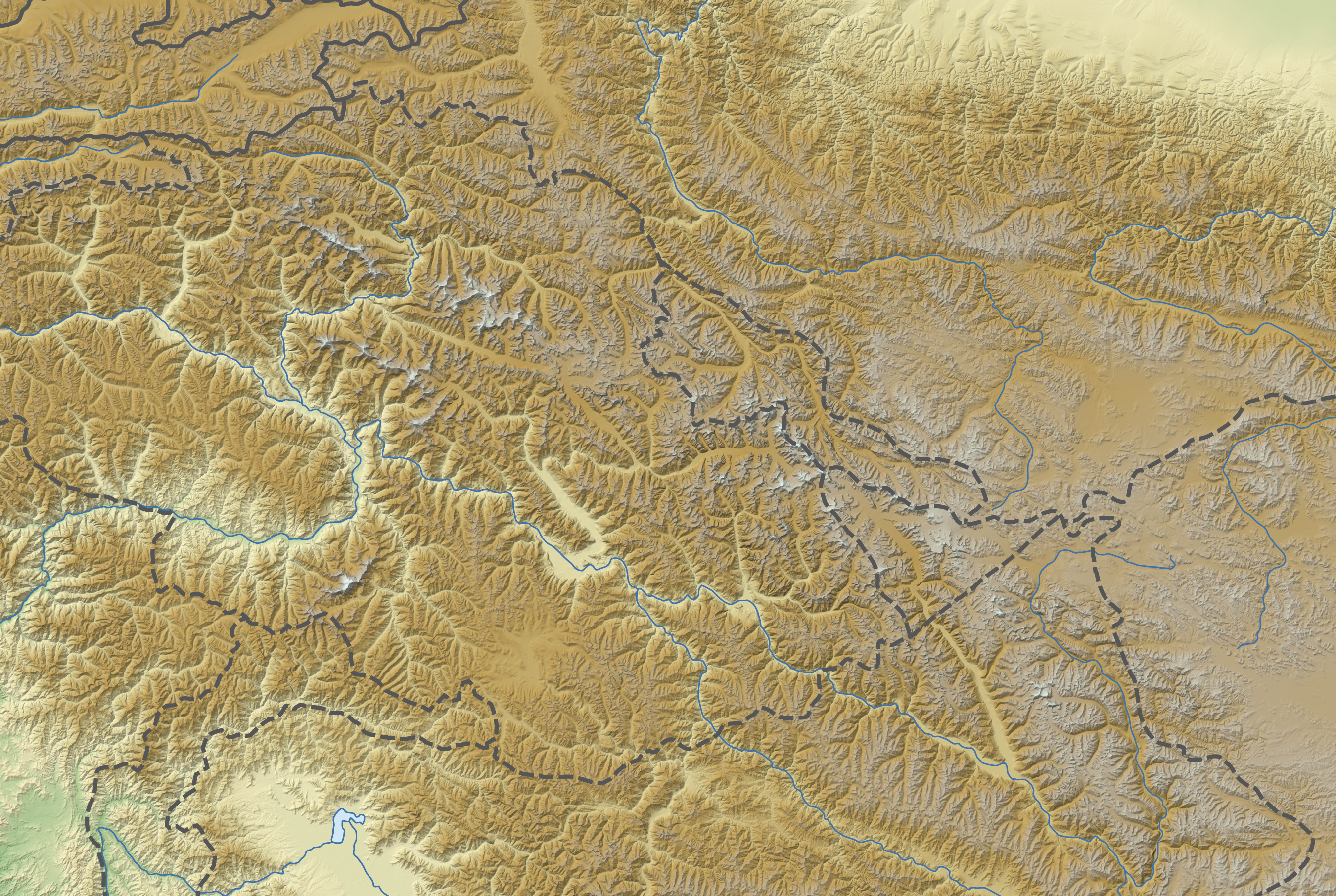
- Location within Karakoram Location within Gilgit Baltistan Location within Southern Xinjiang
- Countries: Pakistan and China
- Regions: Gilgit-Baltistan and Xinjiang
- Parent range: Karakoram

The Baltoro Muztagh (simplified Chinese: 巴尔托洛慕士塔格山; traditional Chinese: 巴爾托洛慕士塔格山; pinyin: Bā'ěrtuōluò Mùshìtǎgé Shān, Urdu: بلتورو موز تاغ) is a subrange within the Karakoram mountain range. It spans across the Baltistan region of Gilgit-Baltistan, which is the northernmost political entity of Pakistan, and extends into Xinjiang, China. The crest of this range also serves as part of the Pakistan-China border.

The range is home to K2 which has an elevation of 8,611 metres (28,251 ft) above sea level, which is also the second highest mountain in the world. Additionally, it is home to three other eight-thousander peaks, all located on the north and east sides of the Baltoro Glacier.

== Selected peaks of the Baltoro Muztagh ==
Below is a list of peaks in the Baltoro Muztagh that exceed 7,000 meters (22,970 feet) in elevation and possess a topographic prominence of over 500 meters (1,640 feet), a commonly used criterion for considering peaks of this stature as independent.

	Height (m)	Height (ft)	Coordinates	Prominence (m)	Parent mountain	First ascent	Ascents (attempts)
K2	8,611	28,251	35°52′57″N 76°30′48″E	4,017	Mount Everest	1954	45 (44)
Gasherbrum I	8,080	26,509	35°43′27″N 76°41′44″E	2,155	K2	1958	31 (16)
Broad Peak	8,051	26,414	35°48′38″N 76°34′05″E	1,701	Gasherbrum I	1957	39 (19)
Gasherbrum II	8,034	26,362	35°45′27″N 76°39′11″E	1,523	Gasherbrum I	1956	54 (12)
Gasherbrum III	7,952	26,089	35°44′0″N 76°38′0″E	461	Gasherbrum II	1975
Gasherbrum IV	7,932	26,024	35°45′33″N 76°36′57″E	725	Gasherbrum III	1958	4 (11)
Skyang Kangri	7,545	24,754	35°55′35″N 76°34′03″E	1,060	K2	1976	1 (2)
Sia Kangri	7,422	24,350	35°39′48″N 76°45′45″E	640	Gasherbrum I	1934	6 (0)
Skil Brum	7,410	24,311	35°51′03″N 76°25′45″E	1,152	K2	1957	2 (1)
Chongtar Kangri	7,315	23,999	35°54′46″N 76°25′47″E	1,300	Skil Brum	1994	1 (1)
Muztagh Tower	7,276	23,871	35°49′38″N 76°21′39″E	1,710	Skil Brum	1956	4 (2)
Gasherbrum V	7,147	23,448	35°44′0″N 76°37′0″E	654	Gasherbrum IV	2014

=== Lower summits ===
There are a number of lower summits near the tongue of the Baltoro Glacier which are striking rock towers, and are famous for their aesthetic, difficult climbing. These include:

- Great Trango, 6,286 m
- Trango (Nameless) Tower, 6,239 m
- Uli Biaho Tower, 6,109 m
- Paiju Peak, 6,610 m

== See also ==
- List of highest mountains
- List of mountains in Pakistan

== Sources ==
Jerzy Wala, Orographical Sketch Map of the Karakoram, Swiss Foundation for Alpine Research, Zurich, 1990.
