= Koh-i-Takatu =

Mountain in Pakistan

Coordinates: 30°23′39.9″N 67°06′44.3″E

Highest point
- Elevation: 3,380 m (11,090 ft)

Geography
- Location: Pakistan
- Parent range: Sulaiman Mountains

Koh-i-Takatu (Urdu: کو ه تکتو;Takatu Mount ”) is a mountain peak located in the Sulaiman Mountains range, in the North east of Quetta District of Balochistan Province, in western Pakistan.

The highest peak of this mountain range is Loai Saar or (Lwarrh Saar) 3,472 metres (11,391 ft), it is the second highest peak of Quetta District, and third highest peak of Balochistan.

== Wildlife ==
Koh-i-Takatu has different kinds of wild animals living in the mountains, the wild animals have reported are including wolf, fox buck, jackals, rabbits, birds and well known endangered species of the Suleman markhor (mountain goats found in Balochistan).

== See also ==
- List of mountains in Pakistan
- Mountain ranges of Pakistan
