= Miar Glacier =

Glacier in Pakistan

- Location within Karakoram Location within Gilgit Baltistan Location within Pakistan
- Interactive map of Miar Glacier
- Location: Nagar, Gilgit-Baltistan, Pakistan
- Coordinates: 36°11′N 74°49′E

Miar Glacier is a glacier that forms in the north of Miar Peak (6,824 m (22,388 ft)) in Hoper Valley in Nagar, Gilgit-Baltistan, Pakistan. It is a major component of the Barpu Glacier. The access to Rush Lake and Rush Peak is through Miar Glacier.

== See also ==
- Miar Peak
- Northern Areas
- List of glaciers
