= Uli Biaho =

Mountain in Pakistan

Uli Biaho Peak ཨུལི་བིཧོ།
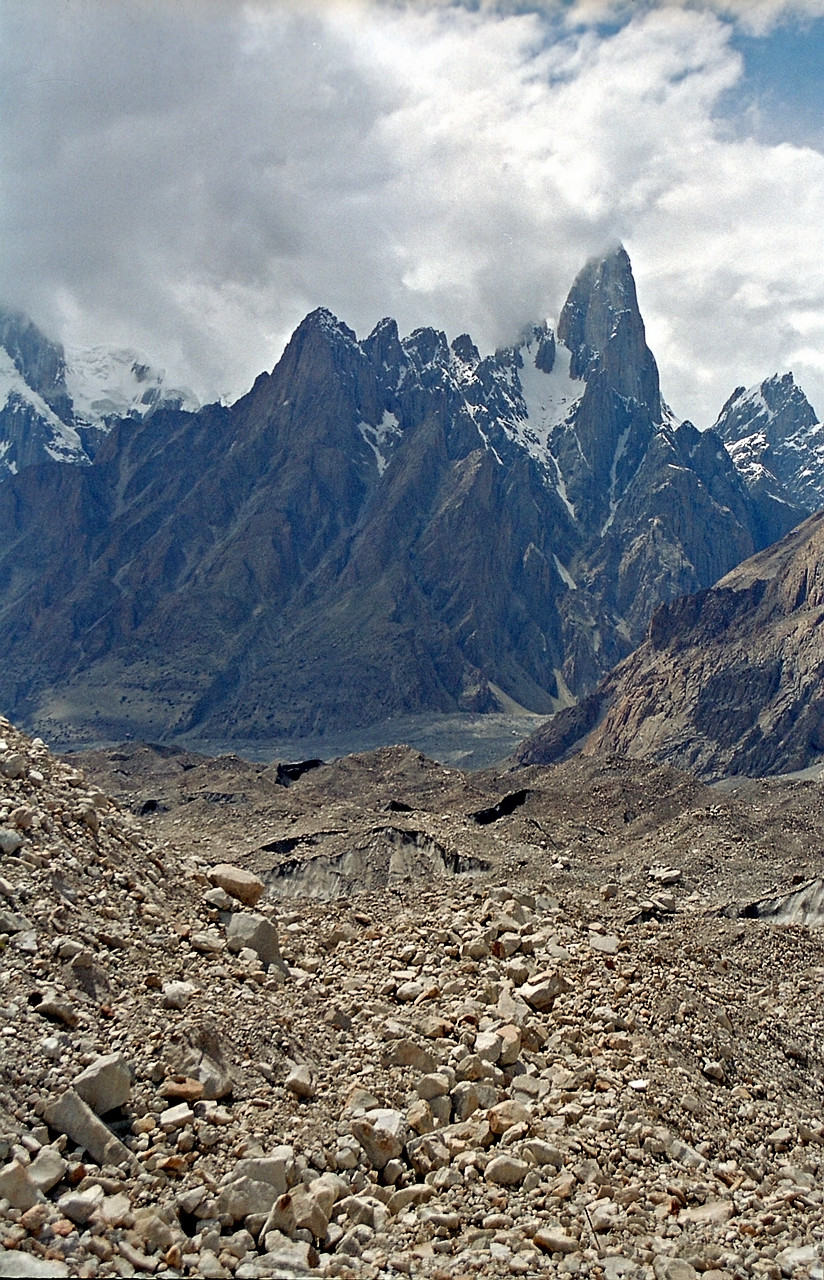
- Uli Biaho Tower

Highest point
- Elevation: Peak: 6,417 m (21,053 ft); Tower: 6,109 m (20,043 ft)
- Listing: List of mountains in Pakistan
- Coordinates: 35°44′N 76°07′E

Geography
- Location within Gilgit Baltistan Location within Pakistan
- Location: Gilgit–Baltistan, Pakistan
- Parent range: Karakoram, Baltoro Glacier

Uli Biaho (Balti: ཨུལི་བིཧོ།; Urdu: اولی بیاہو) is a mountain within the Gilgit–Baltistan region of Pakistan, near Trango Towers and Baltoro Glacier. It consists of two main peaks: Uli Biaho Tower (measuring approximately 19,957 feet according to Roskelley and 6,109 meters or 20,043 feet according to Kopold), and Uli Biaho Peak (with a height of 6,417 meters as per Kopold's measurements). As of 2006, Uli Biaho Peak remained unclimbed.

Uli Biaho Tower was ascended in an alpine-style approach via the direct East Face route by a team led by John Roskelley. On July 3, 1979, all four climbers from the United States successfully reached the summit. John Roskelley later dedicated a chapter to their Uli Biaho climb in his 1993 book titled "Stories Off the Wall."

== Notable ascents ==
- In 1979, the East Face of Uli Biaho Tower (measuring 19,957 feet) was climbed via a challenging route rated at VII F8 A4, comprising 34 pitches. The ascent took place from June 24 to July 5, 1979, and the team consisted of John Roskelley, Kim Schmitz, Ron Kauk, and Bill Forrest.
- In 1988, another ascent of Uli Biaho Tower was achieved via the Pilone Sud route, which involved climbing with a rating of 6b and A3, covering a distance of 800 meters. This ascent occurred from June 19 to 21 in 1988. The team consisted of Maurizio Giordani, Roberto Manfrini, Maurizio Venzo, Kurt Walde.
- In 2006, Slovak climbers Gabo Čmárik and Jozef 'Dodo' Kopold ascended the Uli Biaho Tower (20,058 feet or 6109 m) via the Drastissima VI/6 ABO route on the Northwest Face from June 23 to 25.
- In 2013, Matteo Della Bordella, Luca Schiera, and Sihan Schüpbach successfully tackled the Uli Biaho Tower's West Face (6a/6b) with one aid pitch and 18 pitches of free climbing. This feat was accomplished in a day and a half on July 21, 2013.
- In the same year, Russian climbers Denis Veretenin and Evgenii Bashkirtcev conquered the Uli Biaho Tower's East Face using the Russian Roulette route (1,900m 6c+ A2) from August 8 to 14, 2013.

== See also ==
- Highest Mountains of the World
