= Miar Peak =

Mountain in Pakistan

Miar Peak میار چوٹی
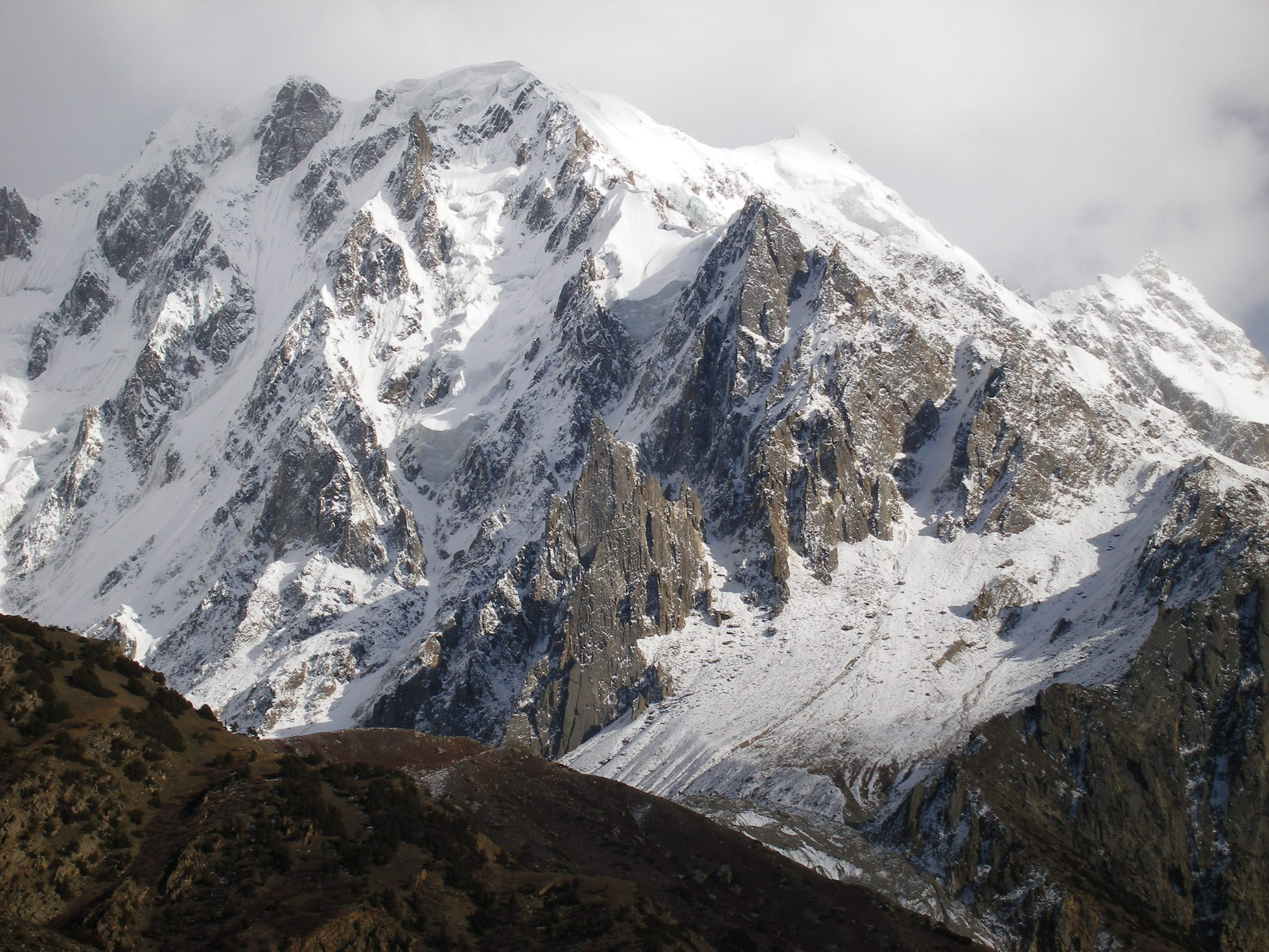
- The ice-clad slopes of Miar's northwest face

Highest point
- Elevation: 6,824 m (22,388 ft)
- Listing: List of mountains in Pakistan
- Coordinates: 36°3′0.68″N 74°49′30.03″E

Geography
- Location: Hispar, Pakistan
- Parent range: Karakoram

Miar Peak (Urdu: میار چوٹی) is a 6,824-meter high mountain of the Karakoram range in Hispar Valley in the Nagar Valley and Bagrot Valley of Gilgit-Baltistan, Pakistan. It lies southeast of Diran peak (7,257 m) and northwest of Malubiting peak (7,428 m).

Miar Peak has remained unclimbed, partly because it is in a location that is difficult to access.

A scientific-mountaineering expedition led by Dr. Franco Secchieri and assisted by Marino Lena failed to climb Miar Peak, because of the impossibility of ascending the Miar Glacier.

== Images ==
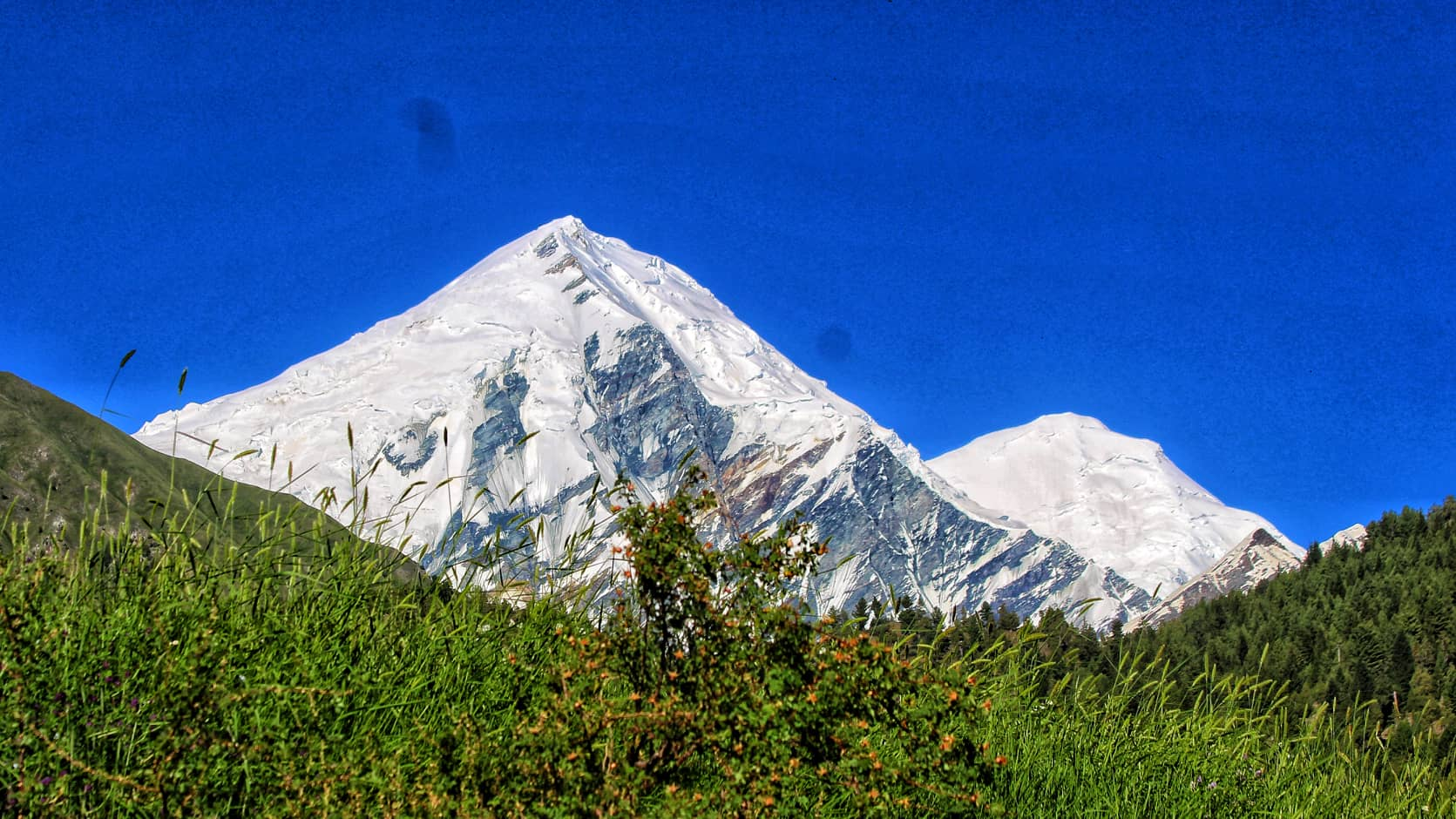
Miar Peak

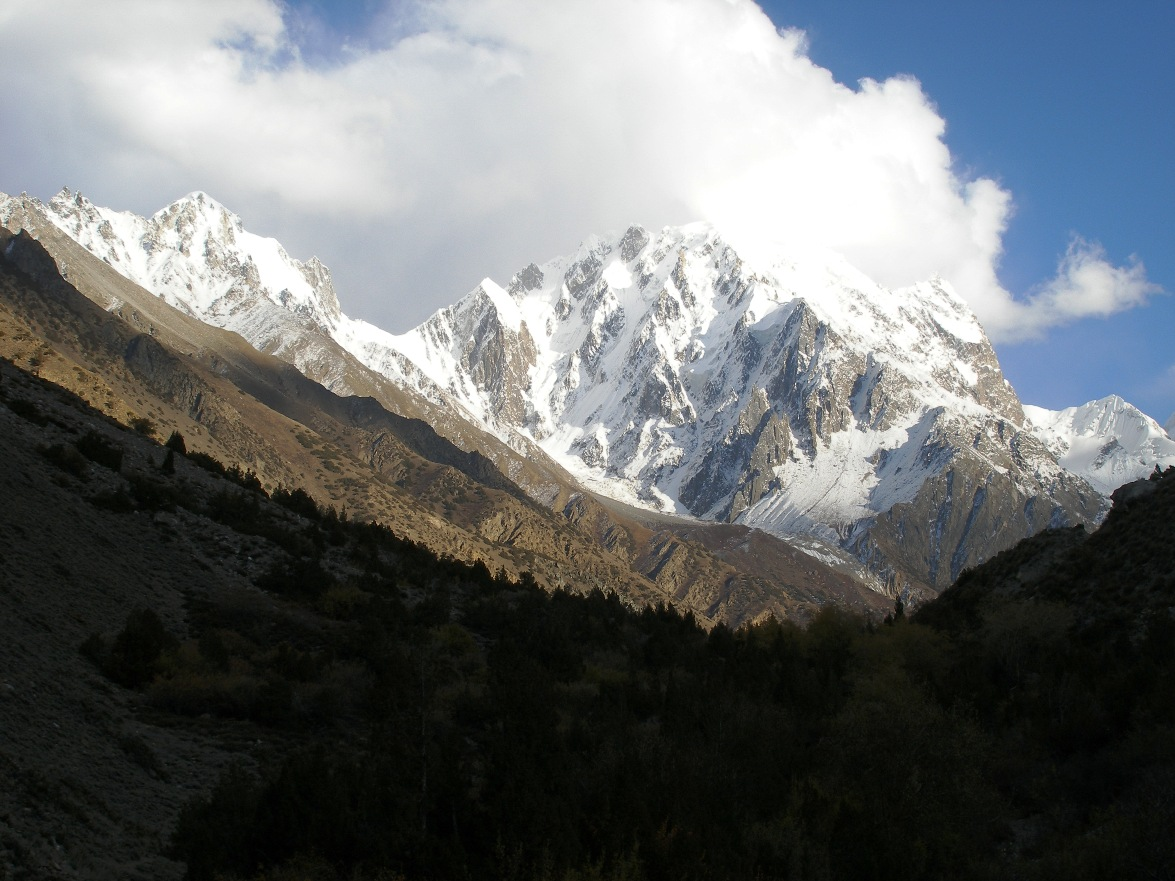

== See also ==
- Miar Glacier
