= List of mountain ranges of Pakistan =

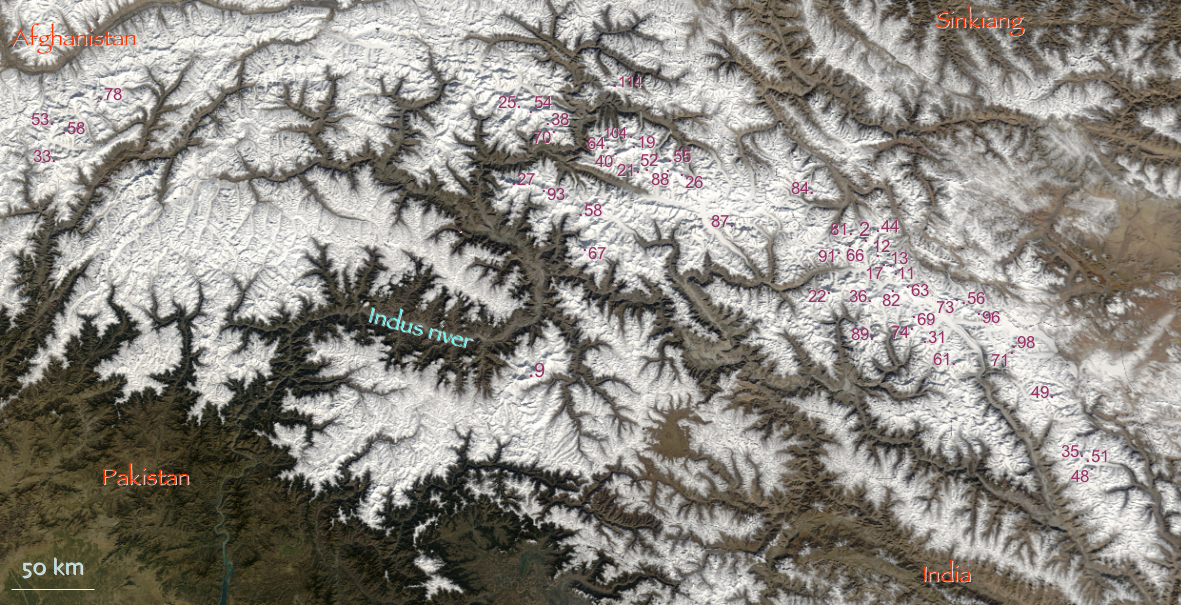
Mountain ranges in Northern Pakistan as seen from space

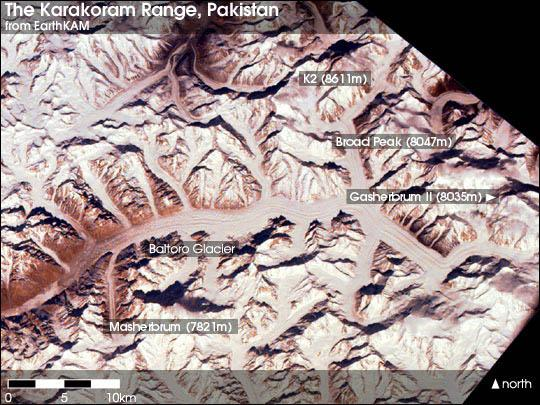
Karakoram range as seen from International Space Station.

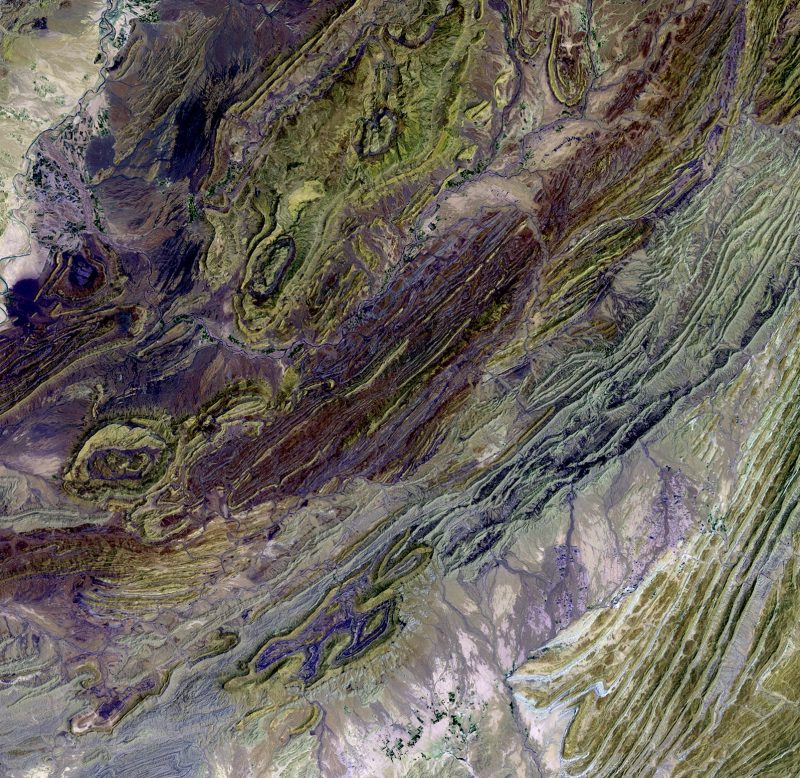
Satellite image of a part of the Sulaiman Range.

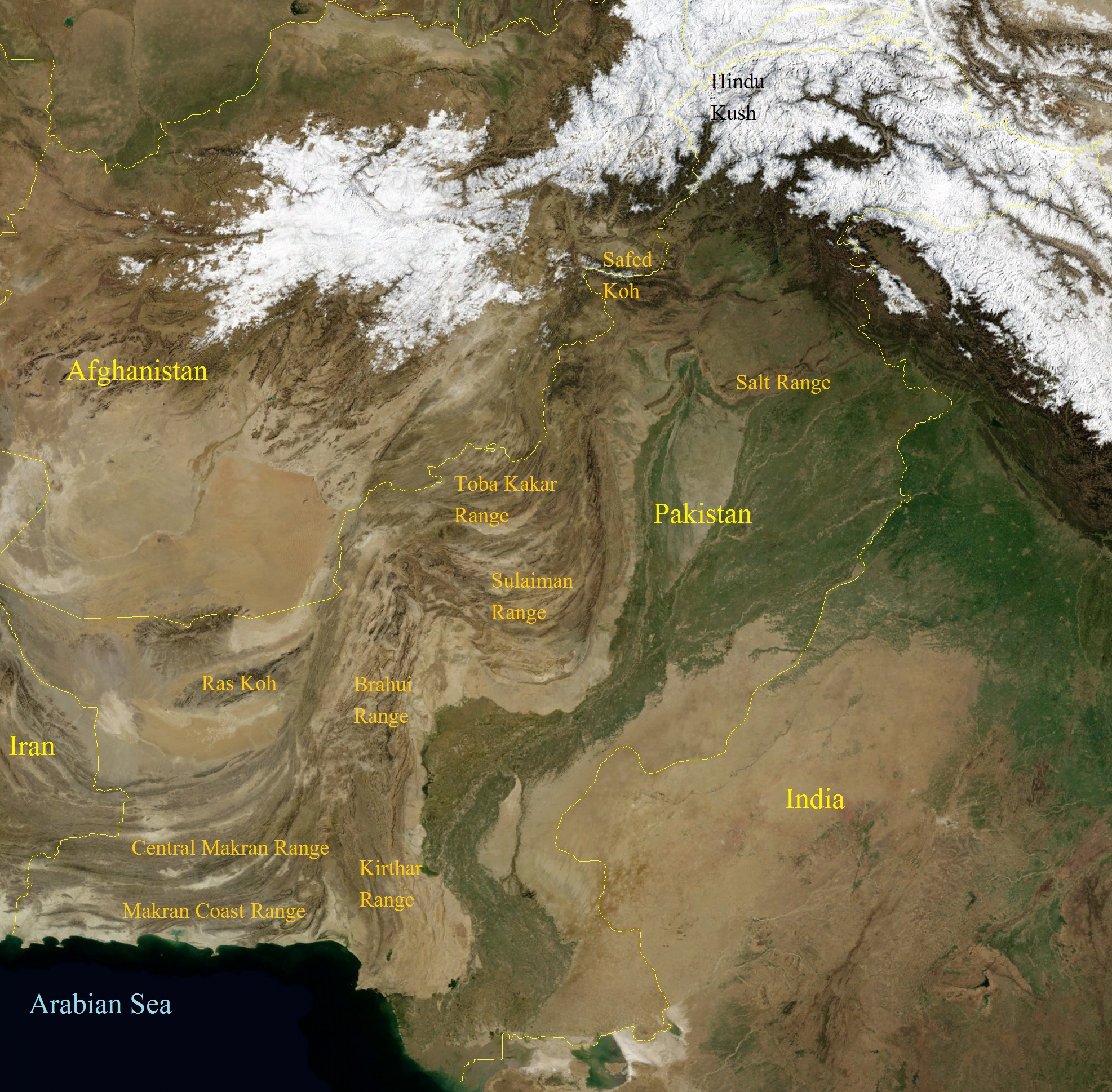
Labelled mountain ranges of Pakistan on map, photograph by NASA.

Pakistan is home to many mountains above 7,000 metres (22,970 ft). Five of the world's fourteen mountains higher than 8,000 metres (26,000 ft) (referred as "eight-thousanders") are in Pakistan, four of which are near Concordia.

Most of Pakistan's high peaks are located in the Karakoram range, the highest of which is K2 with a height of 8,611 m (28,251 ft), the second-highest peak on earth. The highest peak of Himalayan range in Pakistan is Nanga Parbat (8,126 m (26,660 ft)), which is the ninth-highest peak of the world. Terich Mir (7,708 m (25,289 ft)) is highest peak of Hindu Kush and thirty-third highest in the world.

== Mountain Ranges ==
Following are the mountain ranges that are fully or partially included in Pakistan:

- Karakoram in northern Pakistan, the highest peak is K2 (8,611 m or 28,251 ft)
- Himalayas in northern Pakistan, the highest peak in Pakistan is Nanga Parbat (8,126 metres or 26,660 feet)
- Hindu Kush in northern Pakistan, the highest peak is Tirich Mir (7,708 metres or 25,289 feet).
- Pamir Mountains in northernmost parts; the highest peak in the country is unknown.
- Hindu Raj in northern Pakistan, the highest peak is Koyo Zom (6,878 metres or 22,566 feet)
- Spīn Ghar, the highest peak is Mount Sikaram (4,755 metres or 15,600 feet)
- Sulaiman Mountains; the highest peak is Takht-e-Sulaiman (3,487 metres or 11,440 feet).
- Central Brahui Range in central Balochistan, the highest peak is Koh-i-Zarghun (3,578 metres or 11,739 feet)
- Margalla Range, offshoot of the Sivalik Hills in the Himalayas of Punjab, the highest peak is Tilla Charouni (1,604 metres or 5,262 feet)
- Salt Range in northern Punjab; the highest peak is Sakaser (1,522 metres or 4,993 feet).
- Toba Kakar in northern Balochistan, a southern offshoot of the Hindu Kush.
- Central Makran Range in central Makran, Balochistan, Pakistan
- Makran Coastal Range, in southern Makran along the Arabian Sea coast.
- Ras Koh Range, in southwestern Balochistan, Pakistan
- Chagai Range, in southwestern Balochistan, Pakistan
- Kirthar Range, located along the Balochistan and Sindh provincial border. It runs north-south for about 300 kilometres (186 mi) from the Mula River in east-central Balochistan south to Cape Muari (Cape Monze) west of Karachi on the Arabian Sea. The Hill Station of Sindh at Gorakh, in Kirthar Mountains Range, off Dadu, at the height of 1,734 metres (5,688 ft), averaging 1,700 metres (5,500 ft), is one of the two large plateaus in the Sindh segment of Kirthar mountains.
- Kirana Hills, The Kirana Hills is a small and extensive rocky mountain range located in Chiniot and Rabwah, Pakistan. Kirana-I nuclear tests were conducted in these hills.

== See also ==
- List of glaciers in Pakistan
- List of mountains in Pakistan
- List of mountain passes in Pakistan
