= List of glaciers in Pakistan =

Overview of glaciers in Pakistan

With more than 7,253 known glaciers, Pakistan contains more glacial ice than any other country on Earth outside the polar regions. However, a recent study by Pakistan's Ministry of Climate Change and Italian research organization EvK2CNR, indicated that there are more than 13,000 glaciers in the country. Almost all of them are located in the northern regions of Pakistan in Gilgit-Baltistan and Khyber Pakhtunkhwa. The following is a list of glaciers in Pakistan:

== A ==
- Abruzzi Glacier

== B ==
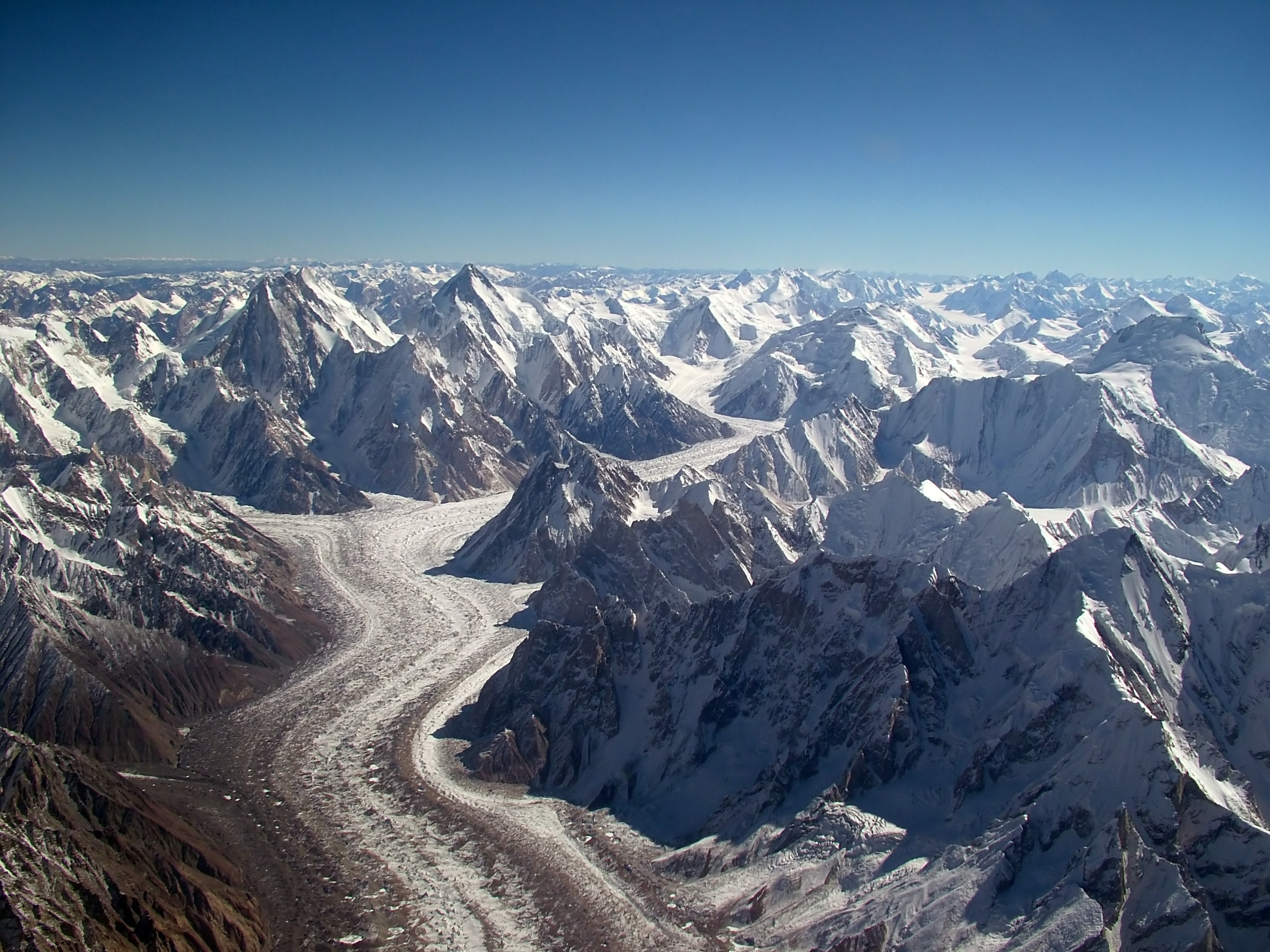
East look of Baltoro Glacier from the air

- Baltoro Glacier
- Batura Glacier
- Biarchedi Glacier
- Bilafond Glacier in the Siachen area claimed by both Pakistan and India, controlled by Pakistan.
- Barpu Glacier located in Hopper Valley, Nagar, Gilgit-Baltistan.

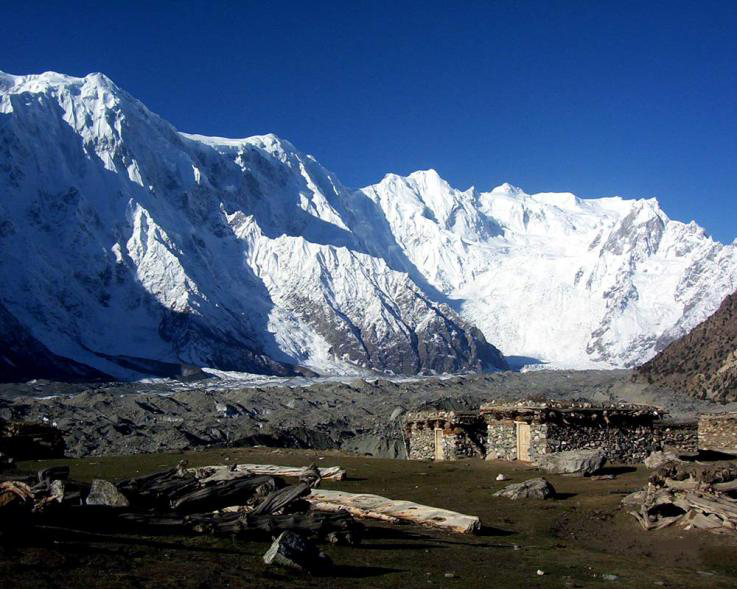
Batura Glacier is situated in proximity to Batura Muztagh.

== C ==
- Chogo Lungma Glacier
- Chumik Glacier

== G ==
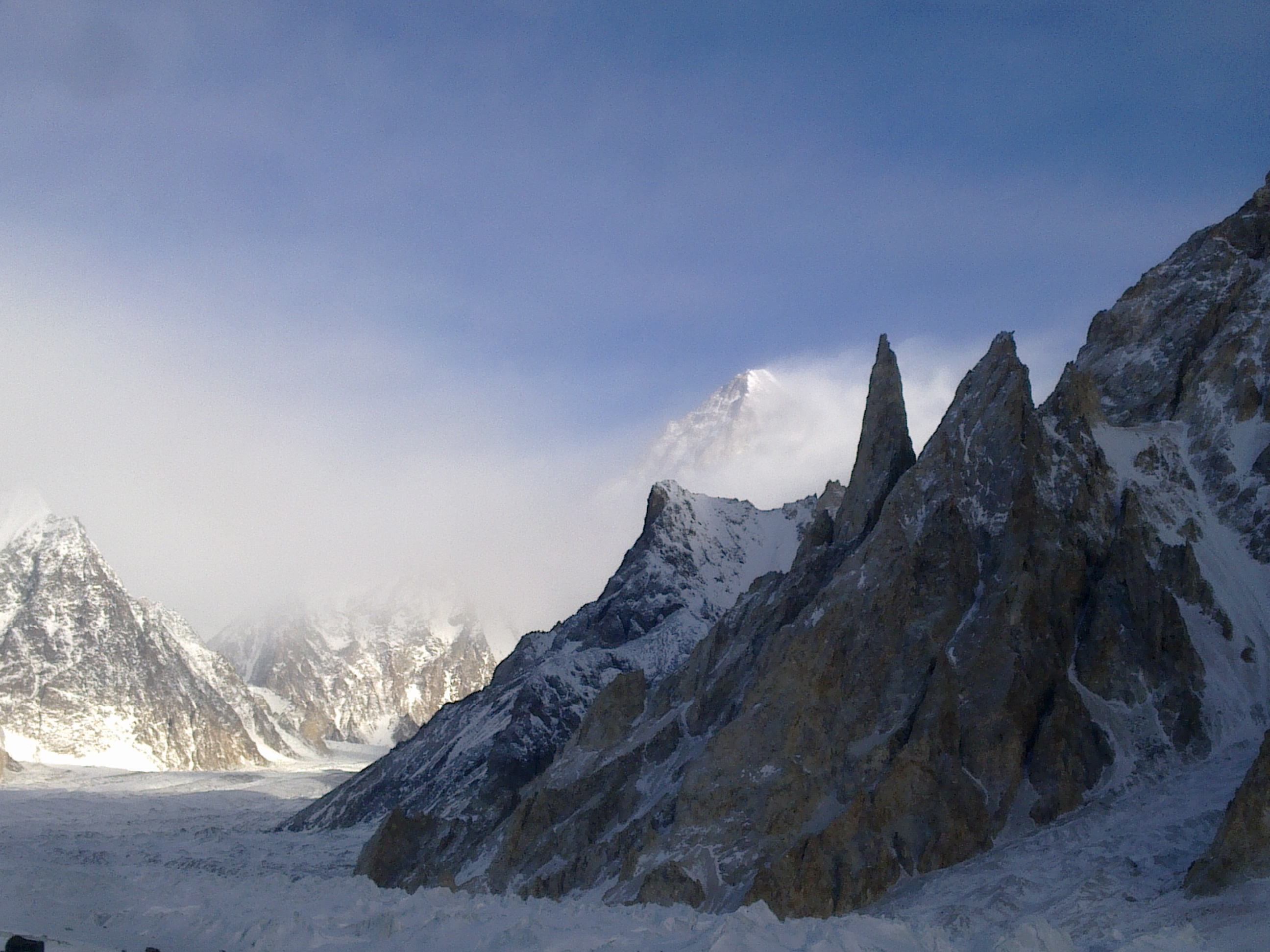
Godwin-Austen Glacier lying close to K2, the second highest mountain on the Earth.

- Godwin-Austen Glacier
- Gondogoro Glacier
- Ghulkin Glacier

== H ==
- Hispar Glacier
- Hoper Glacier located in Hopper valley District Nagar Gilgit baltistan.
- Hainablak Glacier

== K ==
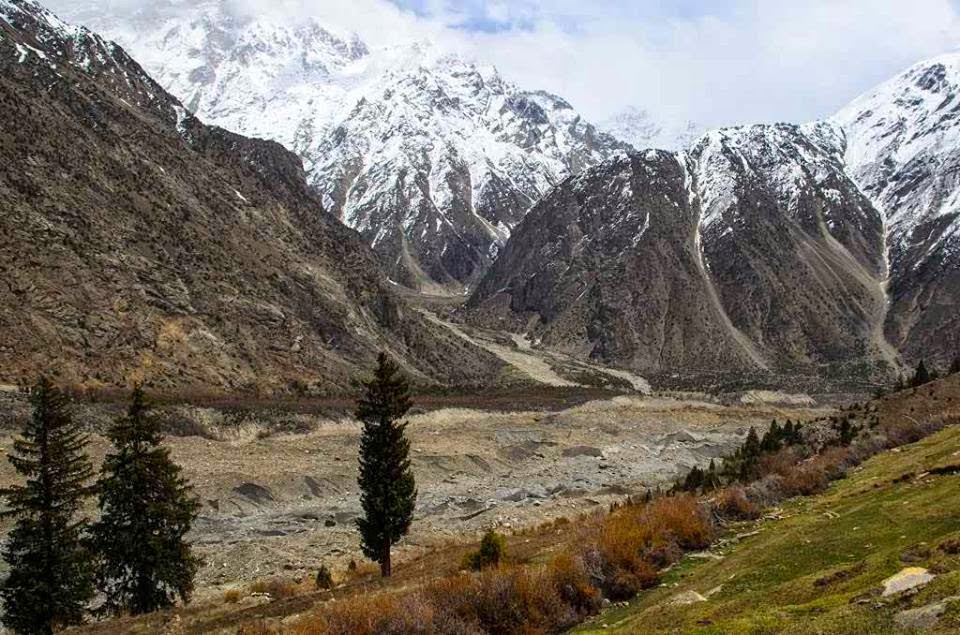
The Kutia Lungma Glacier, a view from north west to south east.

- Kutia Lungma Glacier
- Khunjerab Glacier

== M ==
- Malanguti Glacier
- Miar Glacier

== P ==
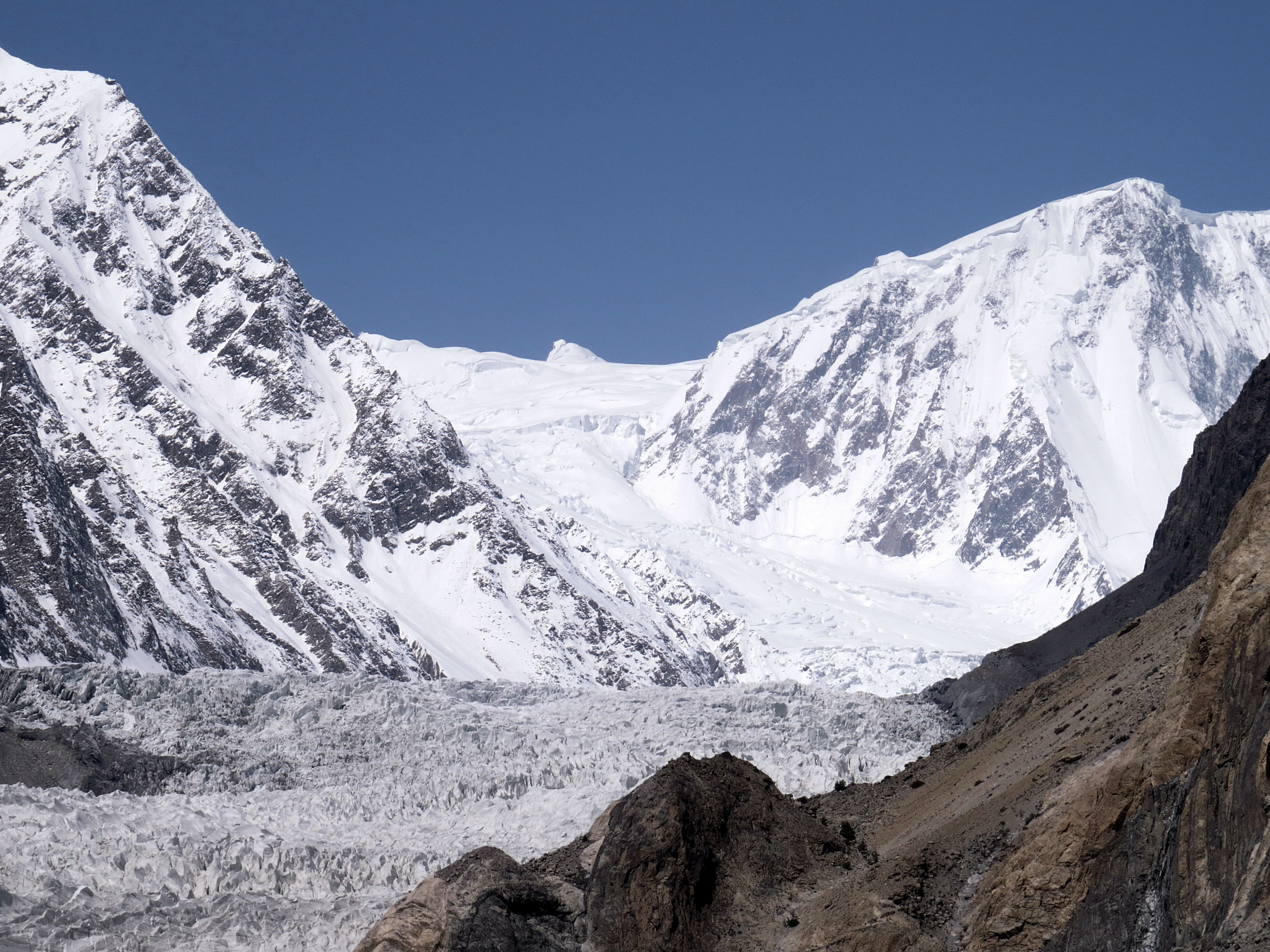
Passu Glacier lies near the Passu Sar.

- Panmah Glacier
- Passu Glacier

== R ==
- Rupal Glacier

== S ==
- Sachiokuh Glacier
- Sarpo Laggo Glacier
- Shaigri Glacier
- Shandar Glacier
- Shani Glacier
- Shireen Maidan Glacier
- Shishpar Glacier
- Shuijerab Glacier
- Shutwerth Glacier
- Silkiang Glacier
- Sim Glacier
- Siru Glacier
- Skora La Glacier
- Sokha Glacier
- South Barum Glacier
- Sovoia Glacier
- Stokpa Lungma Glacier
- Sumayar Bar Glacier
- Siachen Glacier (claimed by Pakistan, controlled by India since 1984)

== T ==
- Tarashing Glacier
- Thalo Glacier
- Thui Glacier
- Toltar Glacier
- Toshain Glacier
- Trango Glacier
- Trivor Glacier
- Tsarak Tsa Glacier

== U ==
- Udren Glacier
- Uli Biaho Glacier
- Ultar Glacier
- Upper Khurdopin Glacier
- Upper Tirich Glacier

== V ==
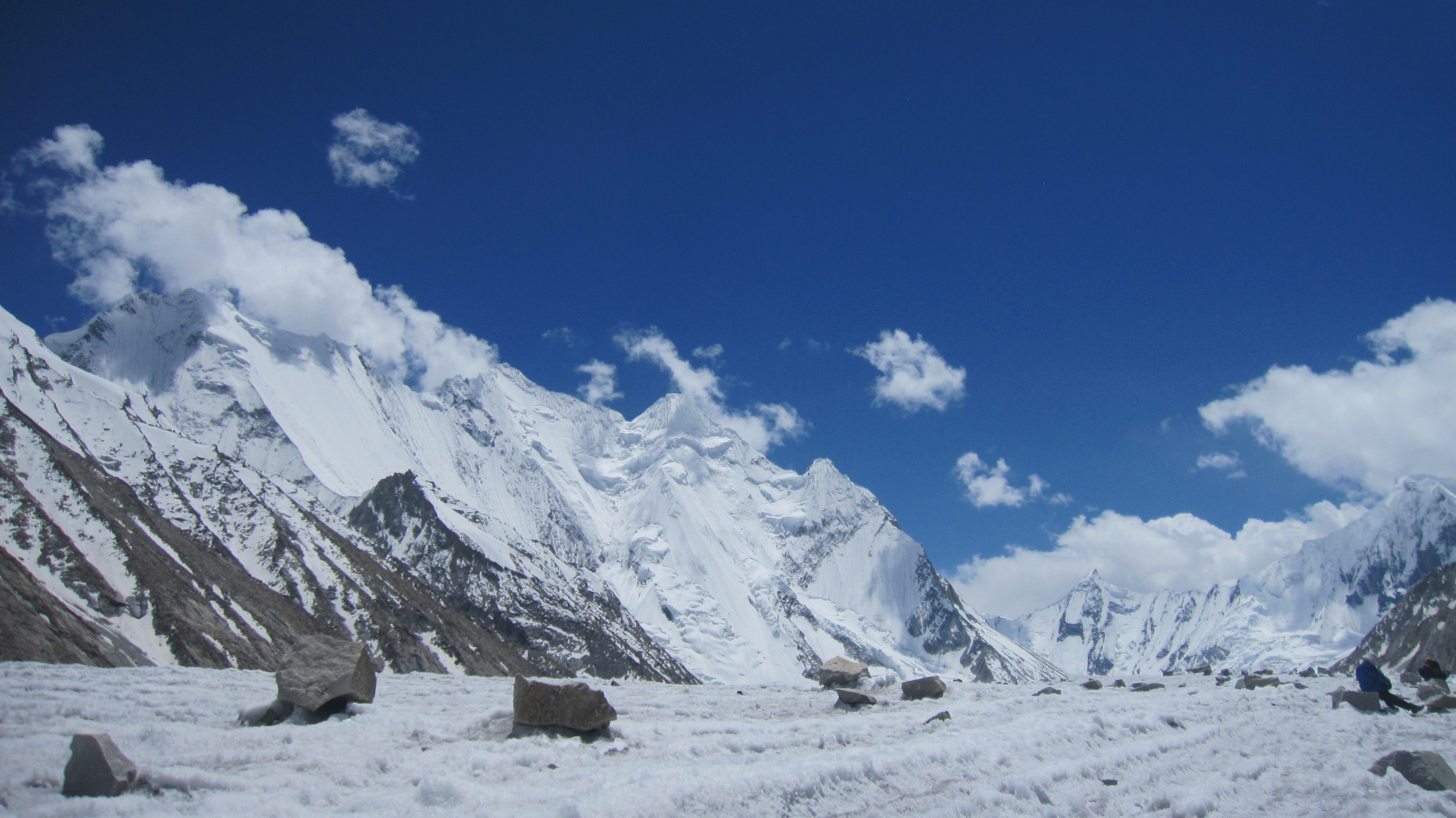
Vigne Glacier, looking south

- Vigne Glacier

== W ==
- Wyeen Glacier
- Waniya Glacier

== Y ==
- Yermanendu Glacier
- Yazghill Glacier
- Yishkuk Glacier
- Yukshgoz Glacier

== Z ==
- Zindikharam Glacier

== See also ==
- List of waterfalls in Pakistan
- List of glaciers
