= Askole =

Human settlement

Askole اسکولی
- Village
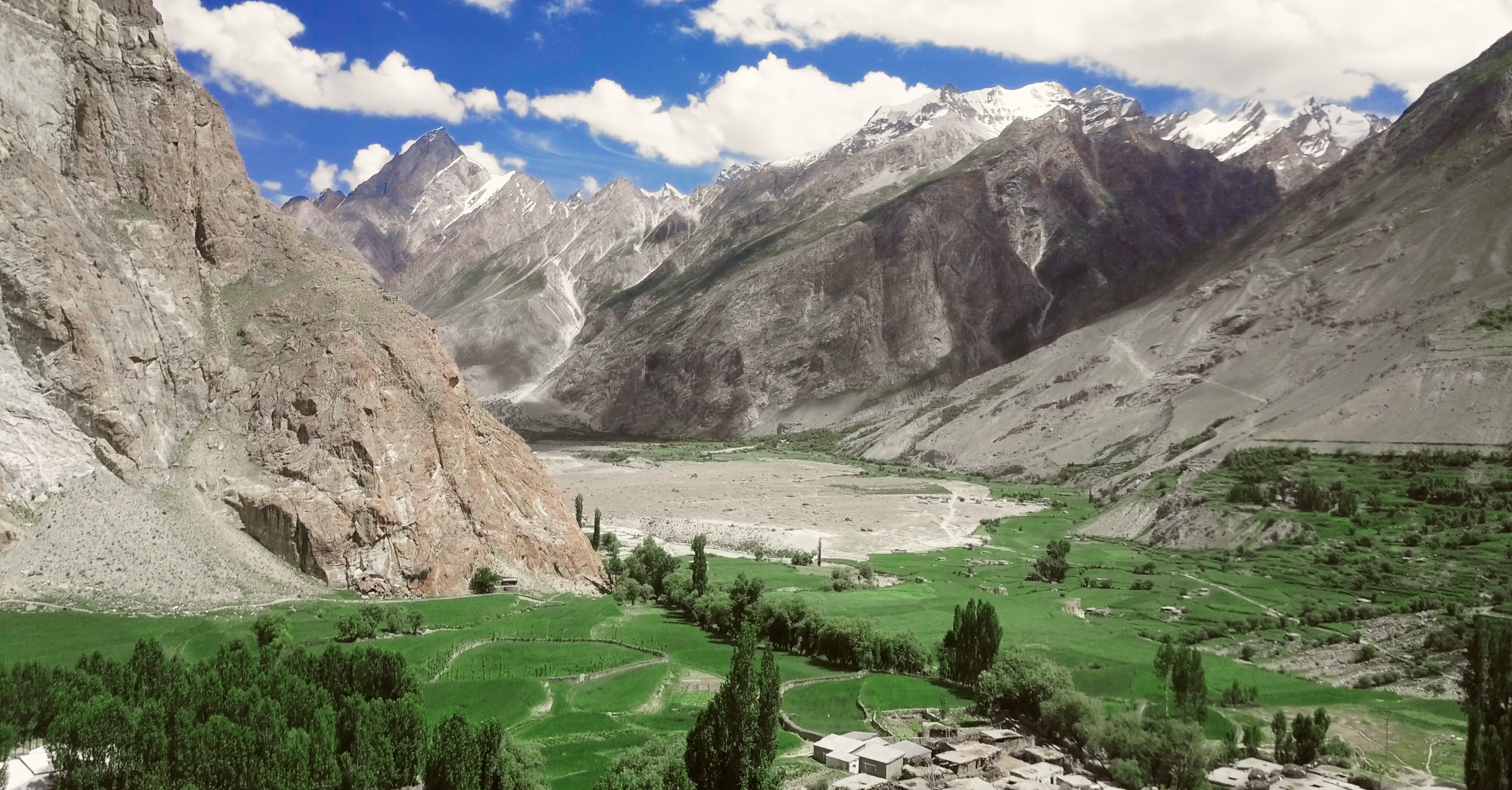
- Askole village on the banks of the Braldu River
- Interactive map of Askole
- Location within Gilgit Baltistan Location within Pakistan
- Coordinates: 35.68200°N 75.81779°E
- Country: Pakistan
- State: Gilgit-Baltistan
- District: Shigar
- Tehsil: Shigar
- Union council: Braldo
- Time zone: UTC+5:00 (PST)

Askole, Askoli, or Askoly (Urdu: اسکولی) is a small town located in Braldo Valley (district Shigar), in the Gilgit–Baltistan region of Pakistan. Askole lies in a remote region of the Karakoram mountains 3,040 meters (9,970 feet) above sea level. It is notable for being the final settlement before the wilderness of the high Karakorams begins. In 1996, Askole had a population of 370.

== Geography ==
Askole is the gateway to four of the world's 14 highest peaks known as the Eight-thousanders (above 8,000 meters), and is the launchpad for mountaineering expeditions to K2, Gasherbrum I, Broad Peak and other major mountains.

=== Expeditions ===
Expeditions to the following peaks are launched from Askole:

- K2, second highest peak in the world at 8,611 m
- Gasherbrum I, 11th highest in the world at 8,080 m.
- Broad Peak, 12th highest in the world at 8,047 m.
- Gasherbrum II, 13th highest in the world at 8,035 m.
- Gasherbrum III, 7,946 m. (Often regarded as a subpeak of Gasherbrum II.)
- Gasherbrum IV, 17th highest in the world at 7,932 m.
- Masherbrum (K1), 22nd highest in the world at 7,821 m.
- Chogolisa, 36th highest in the world at 7,665 m.
- Baintha Brakk, 'The Ogre', 7,285 m.
- Muztagh Tower, 7,273 m.
- Snow Dome, 7,160 m.
- Biarchedi, 6,781m
- Trango Towers, 6,363 m, the highest cliffs in the world.
- Mitre Peak, 6,010 m.

== See also ==
- Karakoram Highway
