= Marble Peak (Pakistan) =

Mountain in Pakistan

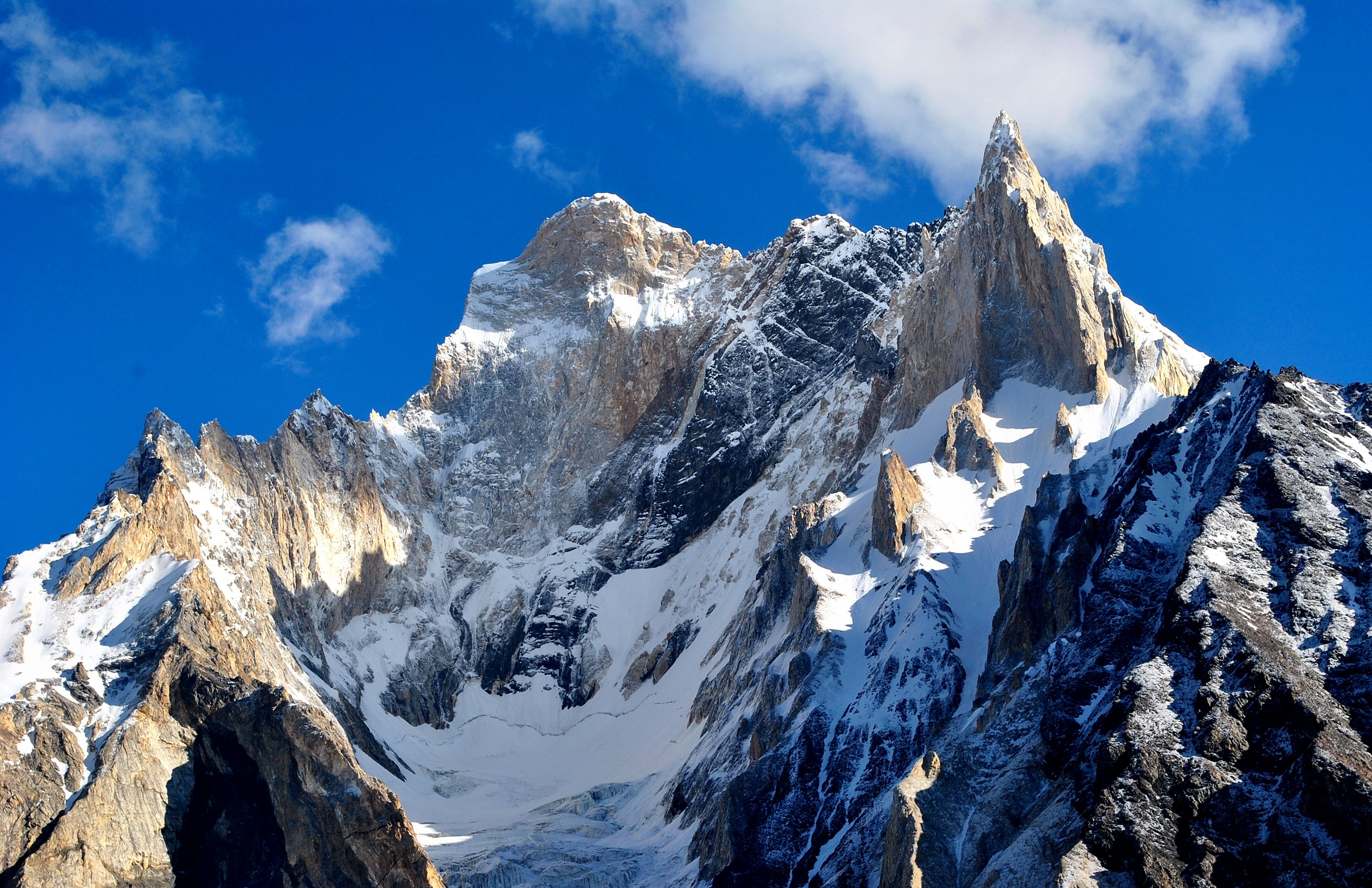
- South aspect

Highest point
- Elevation: 6,256 m (20,525 ft)
- Prominence: 876 m (2,874 ft)
- Parent peak: K2
- Isolation: 5.68 km (3.53 mi)
- Coordinates: 35°46′27″N 76°29′27″E

Geography
- Location within Karakoram Location within Gilgit Baltistan Location within Pakistan
- Interactive map of Marble Peak
- Location: Kashmir
- Country: Pakistan
- Administrative territory: Gilgit-Baltistan
- District: Shigar
- Protected area: Central Karakoram National Park
- Parent range: Karakoram; Baltoro Muztagh

Geology
- Rock type(s): Marble, Limestone, Slate

Marble Peak is a mountain in northern Pakistan.

== Description ==
Marble Peak is a 6,256-metre (20,525-foot) summit in the Baltoro Muztagh subrange of the Karakoram. The remote mountain is situated three kilometres (1.9 mi) immediately northwest of the confluence of the Baltoro Glacier and Godwin-Austen Glacier in Central Karakoram National Park. It is located 12 kilometres (7.5 mi) south of K2 and eight kilometres (5.0 mi) southwest of Broad Peak. Precipitation runoff from this mountain's slopes drains into the Braldu River drainage basin. Topographic relief is significant as the summit rises 1,750 metres (5,741 ft) above the Baltoro Glacier in 2.5 kilometres (1.6 mi).

== Climate ==
Based on the Köppen climate classification, Marble Peak is located in a tundra climate zone with cold, snowy winters, and cool summers. Weather systems are forced upwards by the mountains (orographic lift), causing heavy precipitation in the form of rainfall and snowfall. October through November is the monsoon season. The months of June, July, and August offer the most favorable weather for visiting or climbing this peak.

== See also ==
- List of mountains in Pakistan

== Gallery ==
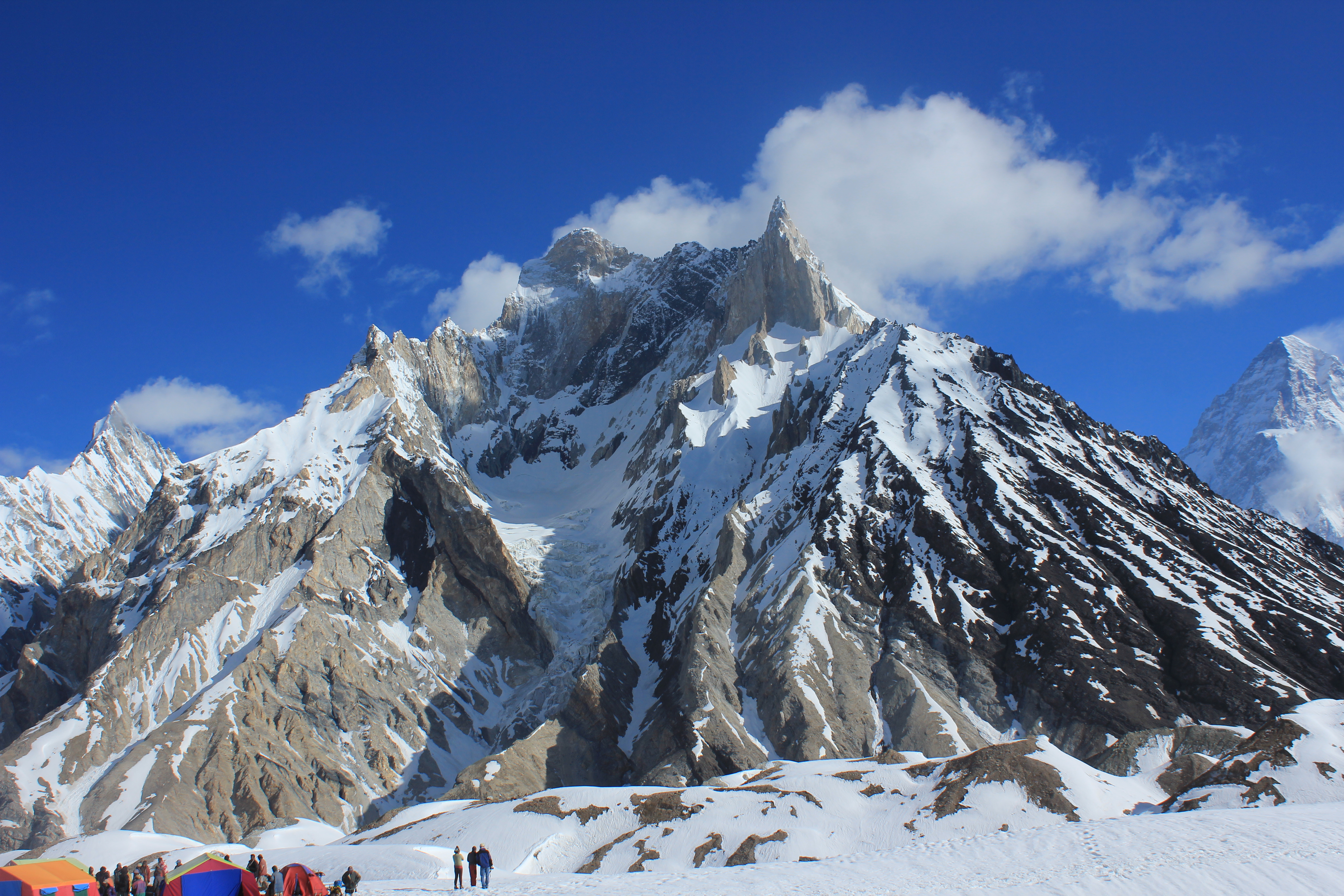
Marble Peak viewed from Concordia

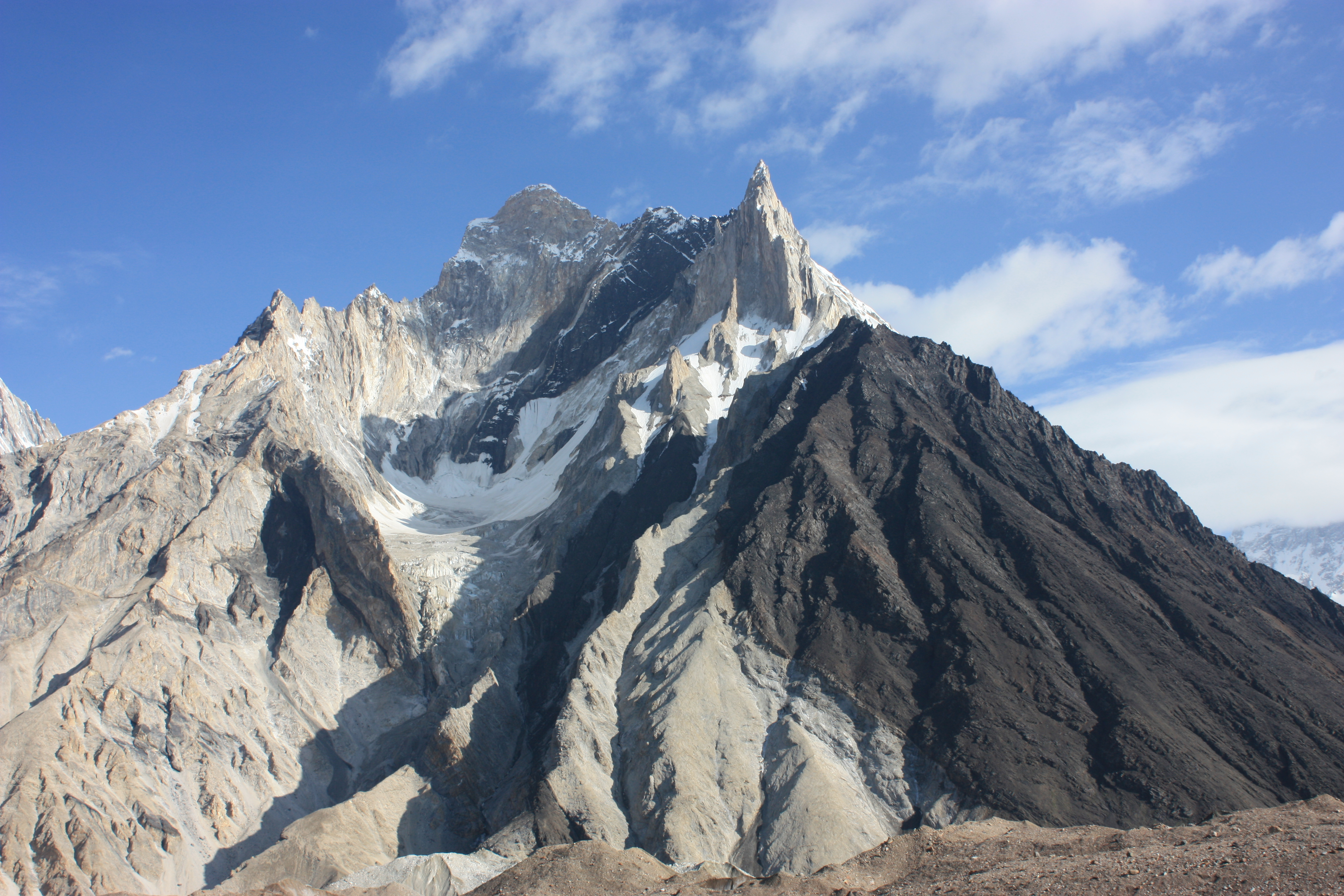
Note the Carboniferous black slate

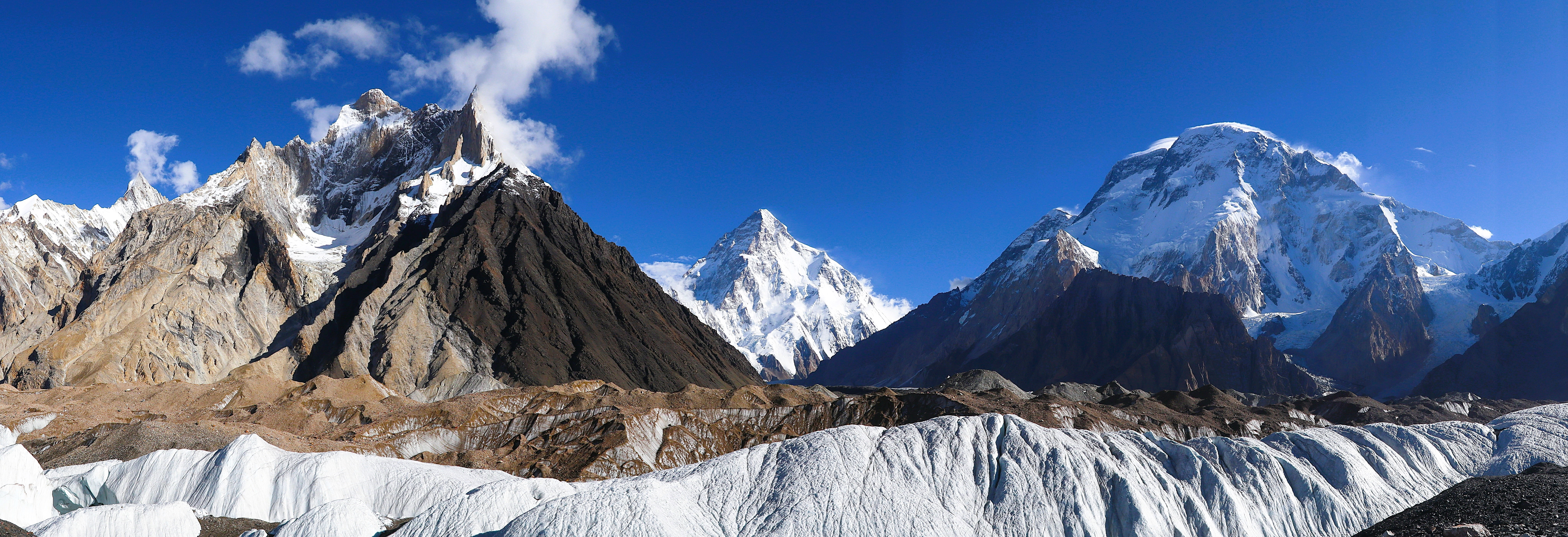
Marble Peak (left), K2 centered, and Broad Peak (right)

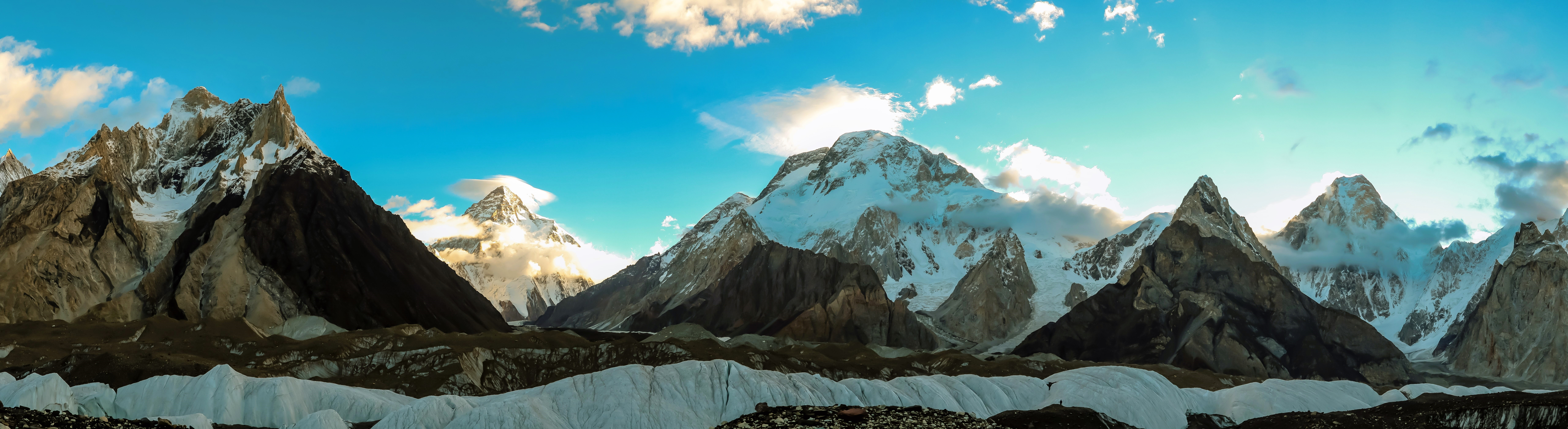
Left → rightː Marble Peak, K2, Broad Peak, Gasherbrum IV
View from Concordia on the Baltoro Glacier.
