= Borith Lake =

Lake in Gilgit-Baltistan, Pakistan

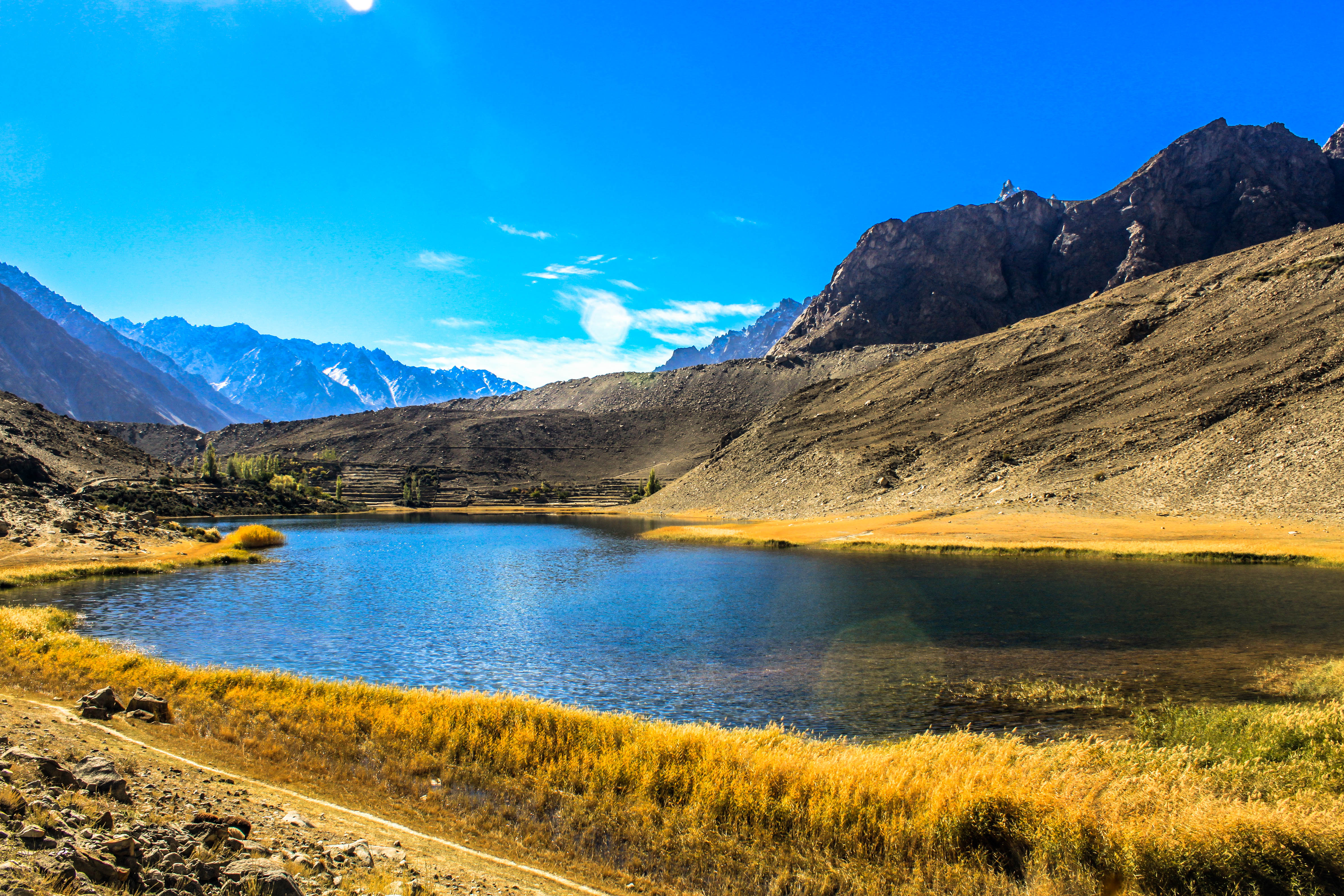
- Panorama of Borith Lake

- Location within Gilgit Baltistan Location within Pakistan Location within Kashmir
- Interactive map of Borith Lake
- Location: Hunza Valley, Gilgit–Baltistan
- Coordinates: 36°25′50″N 74°51′45″E
- Lake type: Saline
- Basin countries: Pakistan
- Surface elevation: 2,600 m (8,500 ft)

Borith Lake (Urdu: بوریت) is a lake in Gojal, the Upper Hunza Valley in the Gilgit–Baltistan region of northern Pakistan. Borith lies about 2,600 metres (8,500 ft) above sea level.

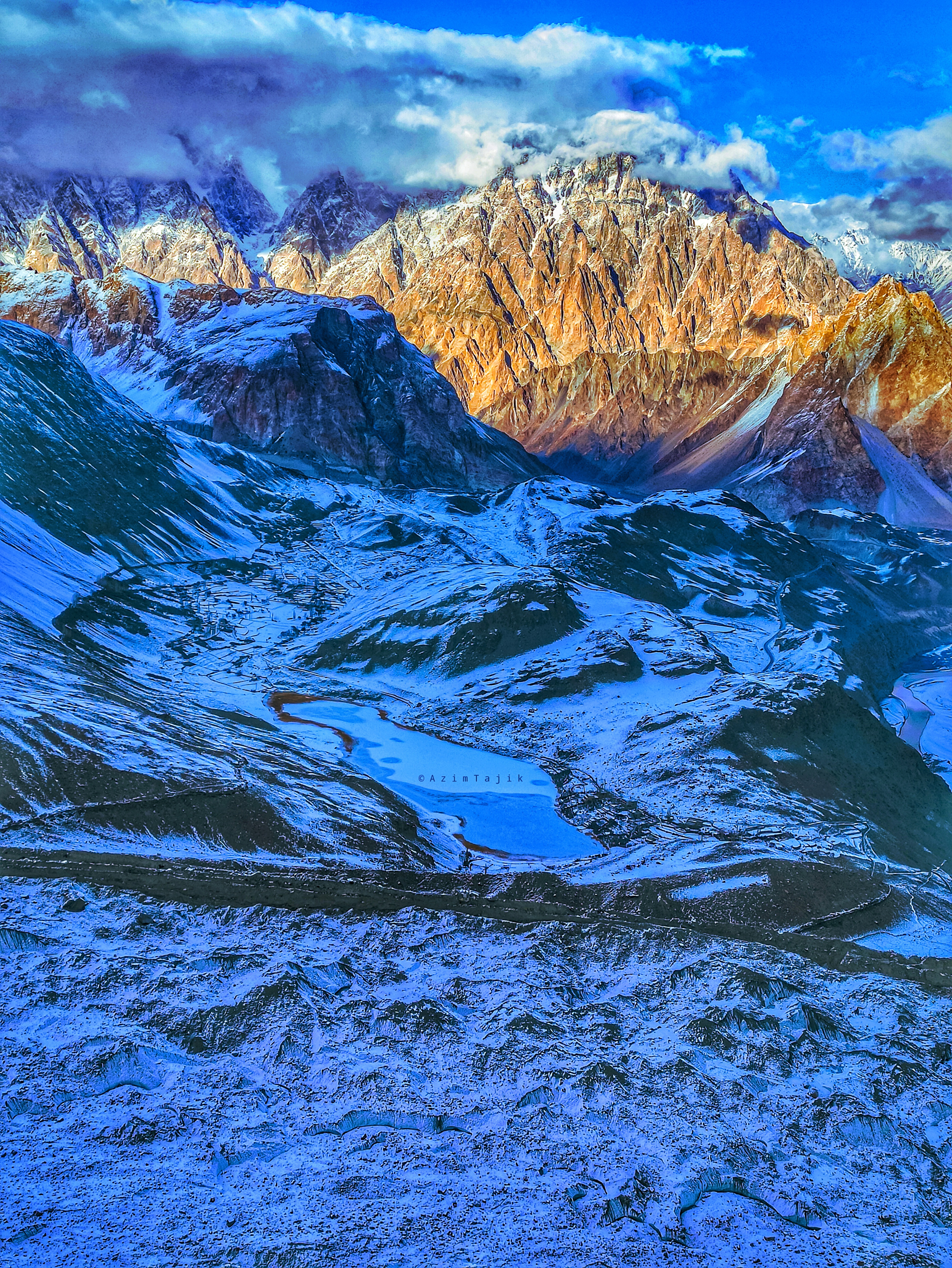
Borith Lake

== Geography ==
Located some 2 km to the north of Hussaini village, Borith Lake is a saline body of water occupying a small hollow at an elevation of 2,500 meters (8,200 feet). The lake can be reached via a 2 km paved route from Husseini village, which lies adjacent to Gulmit village. It is also accessible by a 2-3 hour trekking route directly from Gulmit, across the end of the Ghulkin glacier. The site is a sanctuary for migrating wildfowl and is often visited by bird-watchers and nature lovers. The large number of ducks arriving from the warmer parts of southern Pakistan, can be witnessed between the months of March and June. The birds rest here on their way northwards to the cooler waters of central Asia. Similarly, from September–November, the migration occurs in reverse with the onset of winter towards the north.

A one-hour trek each way brings visitors to Hussaini Glacier. Hikers can follow the trekking route towards Borith Lake as far as the edge of the glacier, and return by the same route.

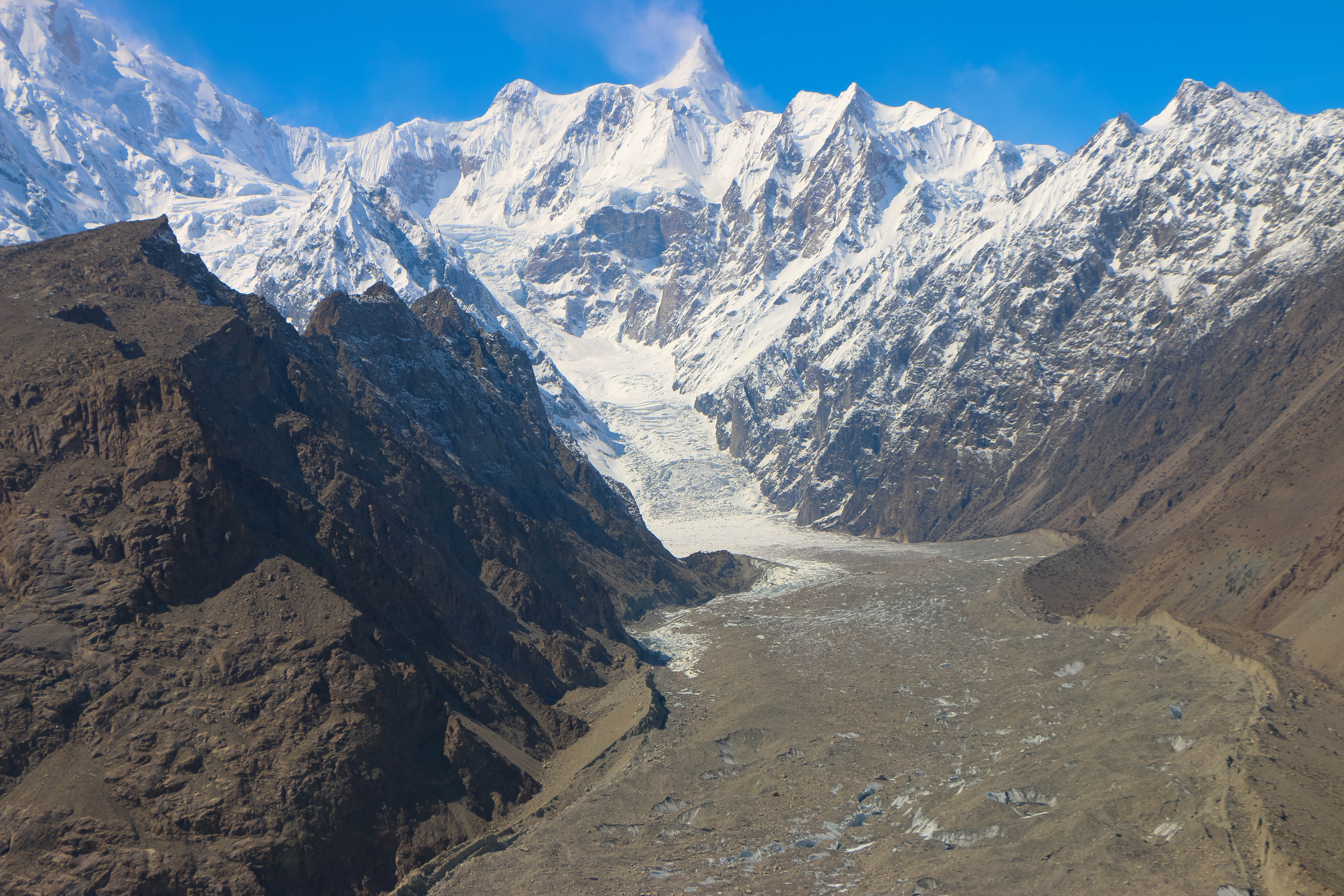
The lake receives meltwater from the Hussaini Glacier

A longer walk to Passu Gar Glacier is another attraction, crossing both Ghulkin Glacier and Borith Lake. Having crossed Hussaini Glacier by the same route, hikers can continue on the southern side of Borith Lake past the settlement of Borith Bala and the now deserted settlement of Shahabad. The lack of a continuous water supply led to the desertification of this village many years ago. The walk takes about 4–5 hours form Ghulkin to Passu. From Passu Glacier, a path leads down to the Karakorum Highway.

== See also ==
- Attabad Lake
- Hunza Valley
