= Baltoro =

Baltoro may refer to:

- Baltoro Glacier, a glacier in the Karakoram mountain range northern Pakistan. Baltoro as single expression without adjunct usually refers to this glacier.
- Baltoro Muztagh, a mountain range in the Karakoram mountain range in northern Pakistan and northwestern China, north and east of the Baltoro glacier.
- Baltoro Kangri, a mountain in the Karakoram mountain range (however not in the Baltoro Muztagh), at the source of the Baltoro Glacier.
