= Marble Peak =

Marble Peak may refer to:

- Marble Peak (Antarctica)
- Marble Peak (British Columbia)
- Marble Peak (Pakistan)
