= Passu =

Pakistani village

Passu پسو
- Village
- Tupopdan and the Hunza River, from the Karakoram Highway in Passu, Pakistan

- Location in Pakistan, Gilgit
- Province: Gilgit Baltistan
- Time zone: UTC+5

Passu (Urdu: پسو) is a small village in the Gojal valley of Upper Hunza in the Gilgit Baltistan region of Northern Pakistan. Located along the Karakoram Highway, Passu is a tourist destination. The village is known for its landscapes and views of the 7,478-meter (24,534 ft) Passu Sar mountain, the Passu Glacier, Batura glacier and the Passu Cathedral (Tupopdan) 6,106 m (20,033 ft).

== Geography ==
Passu is situated along the Hunza River, approximately 20 kilometres (12 mi) from Gulmit, the administrative headquarters of Upper Hunza tehsil of Gojal. It is about 147 kilometres (91 mi) upriver from Gilgit. Passu lies in the Gojal Valley, within the subdivision of District Hunza.

Passu is located near the tongue of the Passu Glacier and just south of the Batura Glacier, which, at 56 kilometres (35 mi), is the seventh-longest non-polar glacier in the world and extends close to the highway. Additionally, Borith Lake, a saline lake, located at 2,600 m above sea level, lies below the Hussaini village.

Tupopdan, also known as "Passu Cones" or "Passu Cathedral," stands at 6,106 metres (20,033 ft) and is located north of the Passu village in Gojal Valley. It is the most photographed peak of the region. Nearby are the high peaks, including Pasu Sar, Shispare Sar, and Batura.

== Demographics ==
The village is predominantly inhabited by Wakhi people, who migrated in waves from Wakhan between 1870 and 1948 to different areas of northern Pakistan. They speak Wakhi language and are homogeneously Ismaili.

== See also ==
- Khuramabad
