= Ulrike Gschwandtner =

Austrian social scientist and mountaineer

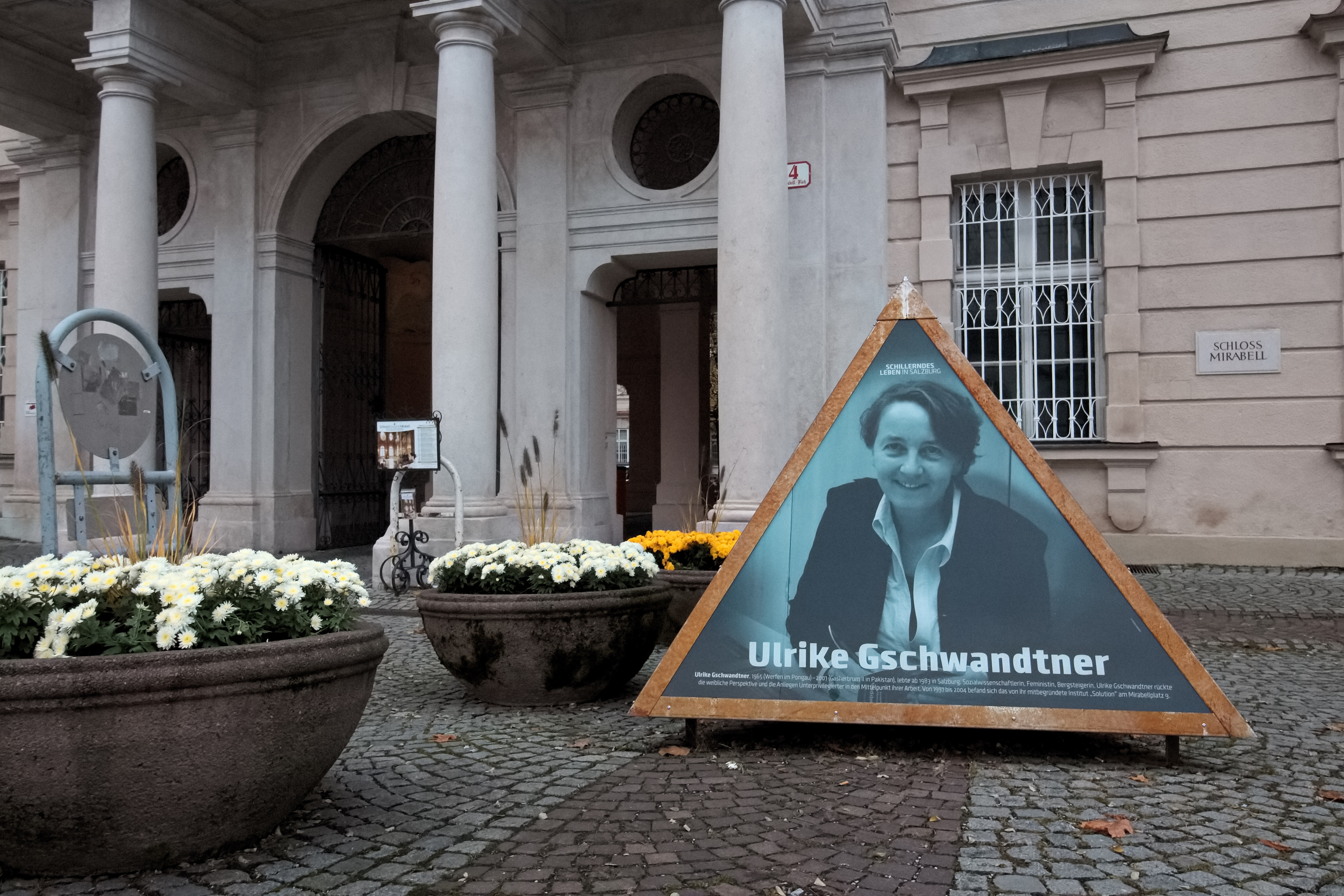
- An information stand dedicated to Ulrike Gschwandtner, part of the 2016 series "Dazzling Life in Salzburg", highlighting notable Salzburg personalities of the 20th century
- Born: Ulrike Gschwandtner; 20 July 1965; Werfen, Austria
- Died: 3 July 2007 (aged 41); Gasherbrum II, Pakistan
- Occupation: Social scientist
- Years active: 1989-2007
- Employer: Institut Solution Sozialforschung & Entwicklung
- Known for: Founding Solution, a social science think tank and research organization in 1996
- Notable work: Über allem der Berg, film about Helma Schimke
- Honours: Ulrike-Gschwandtner-Straße

Ulrike Gschwandtner (20 July 1965 – 3 July 2007) was an Austrian political and social scientist. She was the founder of the Institut Solution Sozialforschung & Entwicklung, a think tank dedicated to women's research and women's empowerment. She died while on a climbing expedition to Gasherbrum II in Pakistan.

== Biography ==
=== Academic career ===
Gschwandtner was from Pongau, Austria. In the 1980s, she committed herself to a career in social science research, focusing on women's issues and women's rights. In 1989, she graduated with a Mag.phil from the University of Salzburg, and then went on to pursue doctoral studies.

After graduation, Gschwandtner went on to lecture at the universities of Salzburg, Linz, and Vienna University of Economics and Business. In 1996, alongside Birgit Buchinger, she founded Solution, the Institut Solution Sozialforschung & Entwicklung. In 2001, she was awarded the Social Policy Prize for the 21st Century by the Austrian Academy of Sciences. Her research focused on employment rights, equality and access for women in the workplace.

=== Climbing ===
Gschwandtner gained experience in high-altitude mountain climbing through ascents of Lenin Peak (7,143 m) and Denali (6,194 m).

On the way to climb her first eight-thousander, Gasherbrum II, Gschwandtner died unexpectedly during the expedition in Pakistan. At age 41 she was found dead in her tent at base camp at 5,000 meters above sea level on the Abruzzi Glacier. The day before, she had climbed to Gasherbrum's camp 1 and back down again to acclimatize. Despite the efforts of three doctors in her expedition party, she could not be revived.

In addition to her work in the social sciences, she was a filmmaker. In 2002, she produced a film about Salzburg climbing pioneer Helma Schimke, "Über allem der Berg".

== Honors ==
- In 2008, the newly built Ulrike-Gschwandtner-Straße in Salzburg's Nonntal district was named after her. In the announcement, the council sought to honor her achievements in science, culture and sport.
- In 2016, Gschwandtner was recognized as one of 13 of Salzburg's "Non-conformists" in a special exhibition honoring Dazzling Life in Salzburg.
