= Khuramabad =

Coordinates: 36.439°N 74.913°E

Khuramabad is a hamlet located on the east side of Passu valley in Gojal, Hunza in Pakistan. It is used for pasture in winter. It is on the other side of the Hunza river from Passu village. There is no vehicle access across the river, only a long pedestrian suspension bridge crossing. Many tourists come to see the bridge. Above Khuramabad is a beautiful viewpoint called Abdegar, which offers panoramic views of many colorful mountains around Passu and Batura valley.
