= Biarchedi Glacier =

Glacier in Pakistan

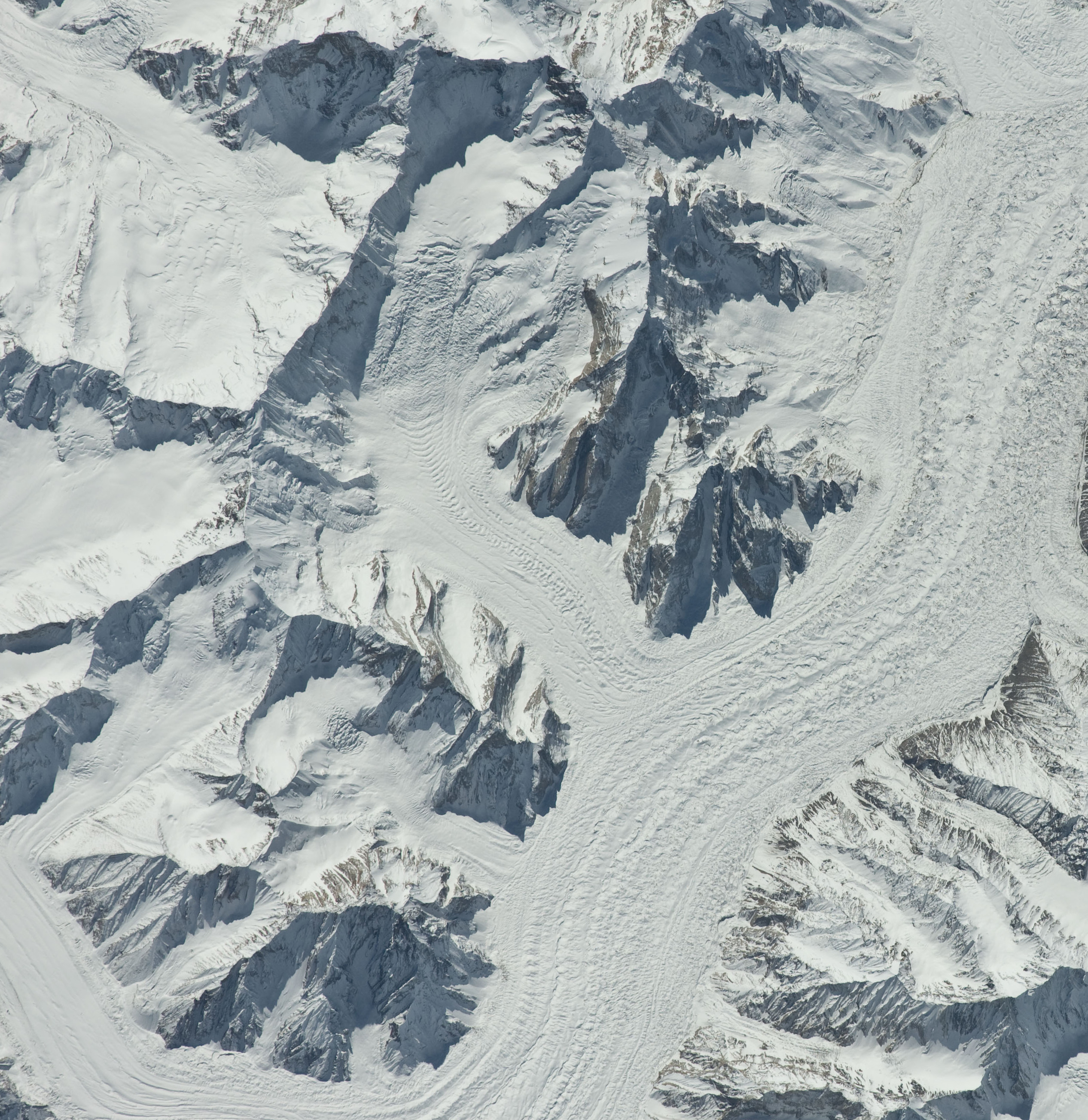
- Biarchedi Glacier and mountain Gondogoro Ri

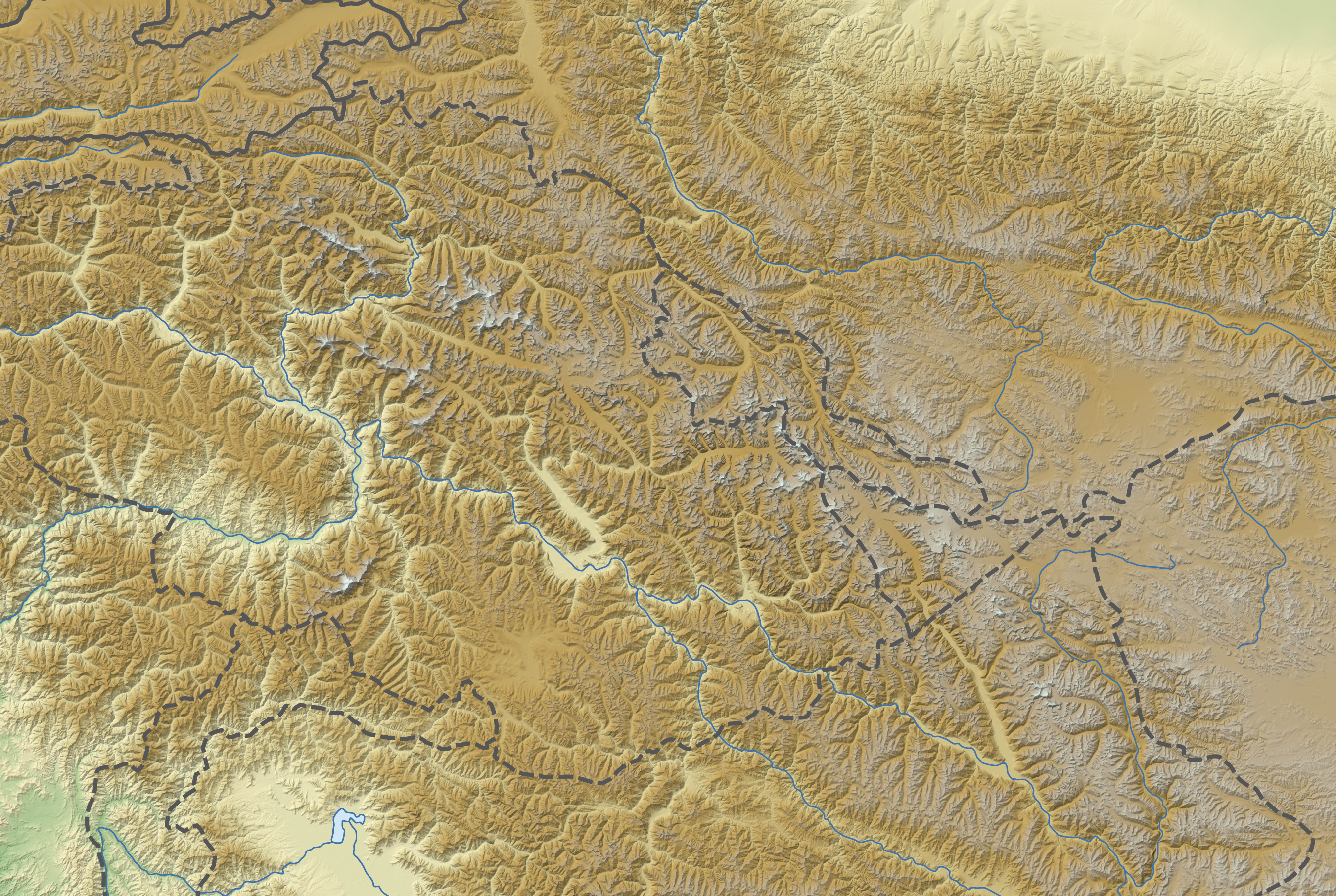
- Location within Karakoram Location within Gilgit Baltistan
- Interactive map of Biarchedi Glacier
- Type: Mountain glacier
- Location: Karakoram range, Baltistan, Pakistan
- Coordinates: 35°42′38″N 76°26′10″E

The Biarchedi Glacier (Urdu: بیارچڑی گلیشیر) is located on the northeast of Biarchedi Peak in Gilgit-Baltistan, Pakistan. It flows north into the Baltoro Glacier.

== See also ==
- Biarchedi Peak
- Northern Areas
- List of mountains in Pakistan
- List of highest mountains
- Glacier
- List of glaciers
