= Godwin-Austen Glacier =

Glacier in Pakistan

Godwin-Austen
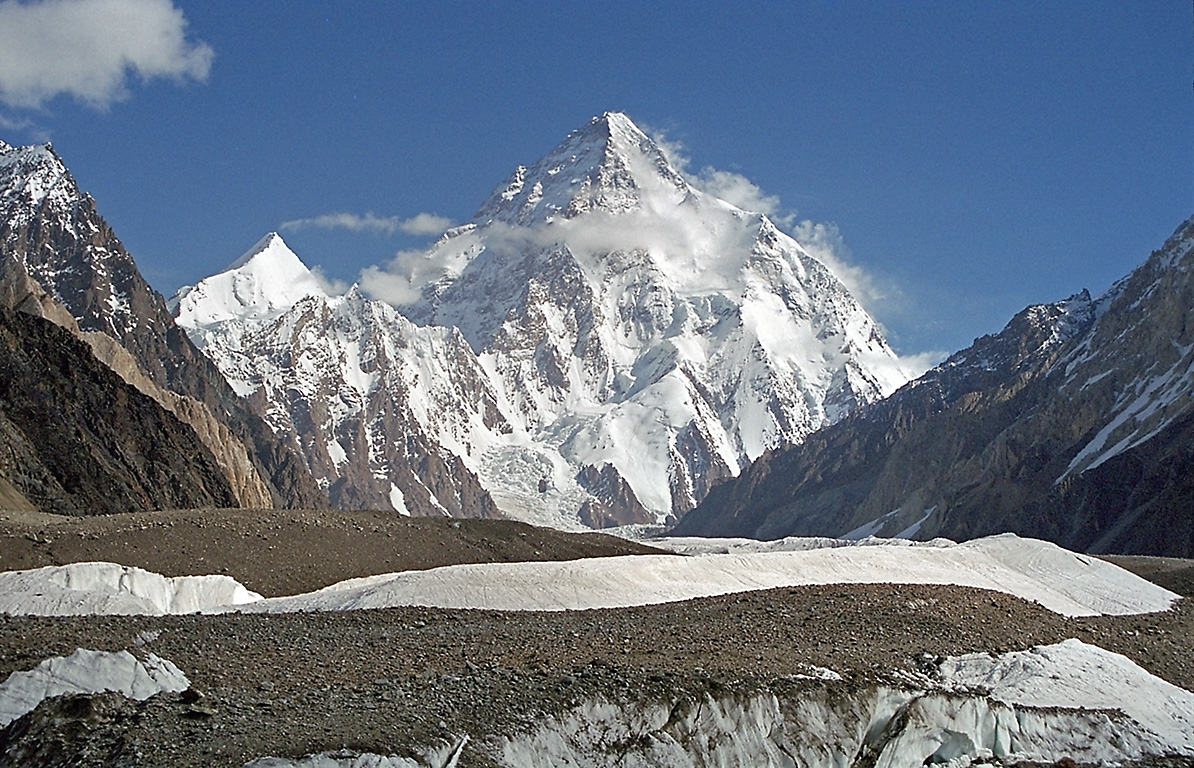
- K2 from Concordia

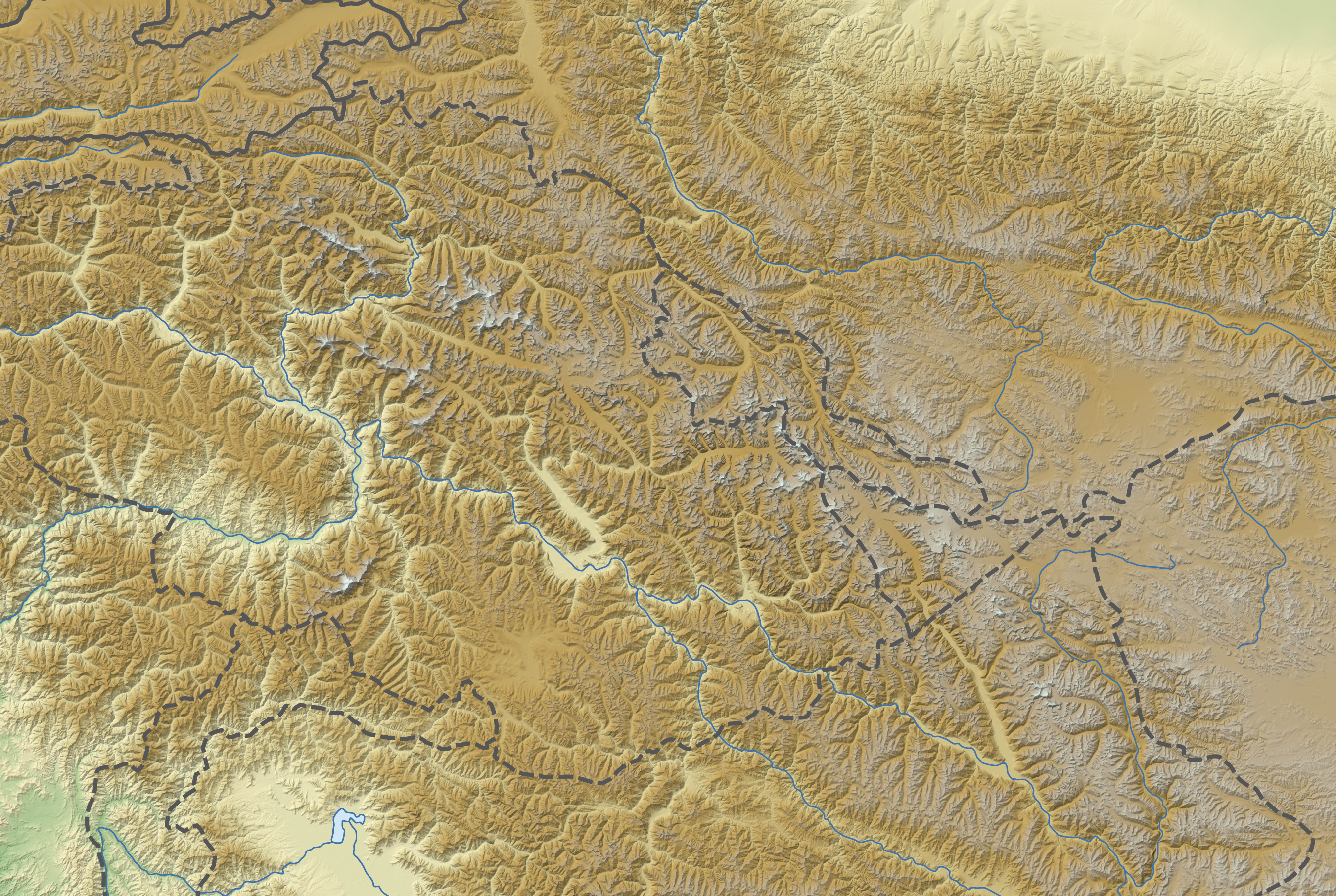
- Location within Karakoram Location within Gilgit Baltistan
- Interactive map of Godwin-Austen
- Type: Mountain glacier
- Location: Karakoram range, Gilgit-Baltistan, Pakistan
- Coordinates: 35°48′N 76°31′E

The Godwin-Austen Glacier is a glacier in the Karakoram range and is close to K2, the second highest mountain peak in the world, situated in Gilgit-Baltistan region of Pakistan. Its confluence with the Baltoro Glacier is called Concordia and is a popular trekking destination as it provides views of four of the five eight-thousanders in the region.

The Godwin-Austen Glacier, located in the Central Karakoram, forms part of the Upper Indus Basin.

The glacier can be approached via the Balti town of Skardu. It receives its name from Henry Haversham Godwin-Austen, an early explorer of this region. K2 was also once proposed to be named Mount Godwin-Austen in his honour, but was rejected.

== List of peaks around the glacier ==
Peaks near Concordia include:

- K2, 2nd highest of the world at 8,611m.
- Gasherbrum I, 11th highest of the world at 8,080m.
- Broad Peak, 12th highest of the world at 8,047m.
- Gasherbrum II, 13th highest of the world at 8,035m.
- Gasherbrum III, 7,946m. (Often regarded as a subpeak of Gasherbrum II.)
- Gasherbrum IV, 17th highest of the world at 7,932m.
- Masherbrum (K1), 22nd highest of the world at 7,821m.
- Chogolisa, 36th highest of the world at 7,665m.
- Muztagh Tower, 7,273m.
- Snow Dome, 7,160m.
- Biarchedi, 6,781 m
- Mitre Peak, 6,010m.

== See also ==
- Baltoro Glacier
- Gilgit–Baltistan
- Eight-thousander
- List of mountains in Pakistan
- List of highest mountains
- List of glaciers
