= Concordia (Karakoram) =

Glacial confluence in the Karakoram mountain range of Pakistan

Coordinates: 35°44′N 76°31′E

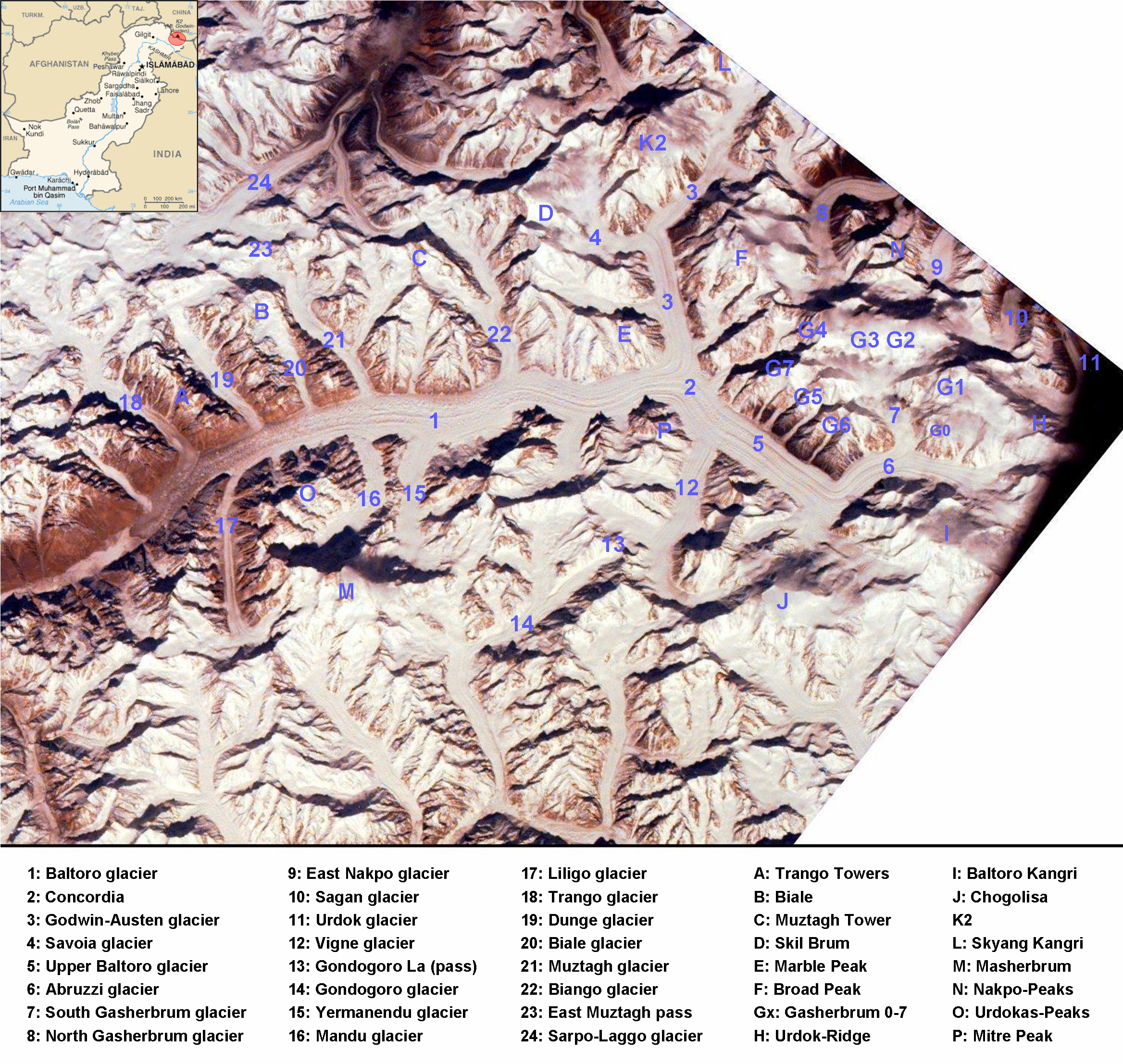
Concordia (#2) at the confluence of Upper Baltoro and Godwin-Austen glacier

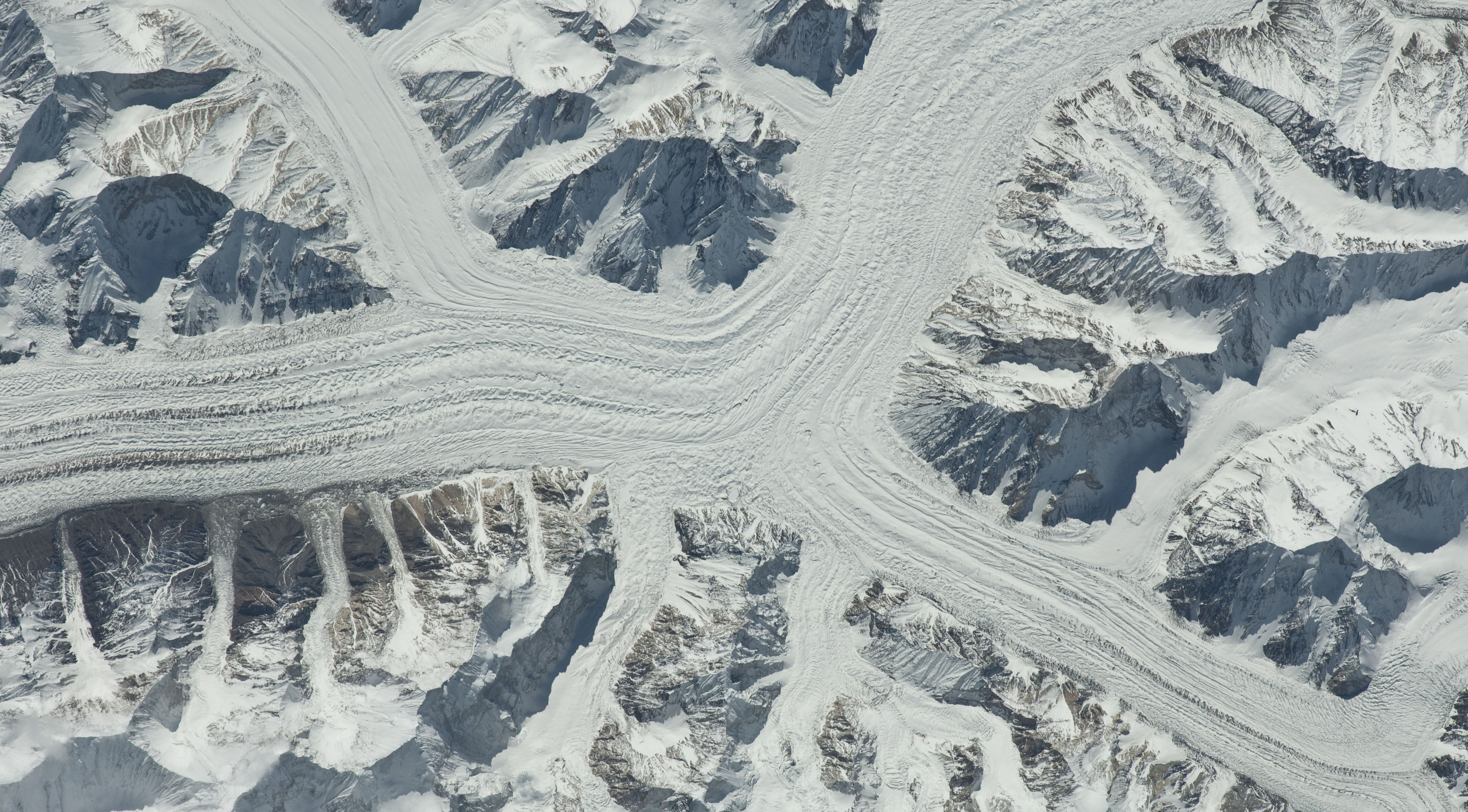
Concordia as seen from space, Marble Peak, Mitre Peak, Vigne Glacier, West Gasherbrum Glacier and Broad Peak Glacier

Concordia (Balti: ཅོནྕོརདིཨ།; Urdu: کونکورڈیا) is the confluence of the Baltoro Glacier and the Godwin-Austen Glacier in the Karakoram mountain range of Pakistan. It is located in the Baltistan region of Pakistan, at 4,691 metres (15,390 ft) above sea level. The area is often used as a base camp for mountaineering expeditions on K2 and other nearby peaks, and is also a popular destination for trekkers and backpackers.

The name was first applied by English mountaineer Aleister Crowley during the 1902 Eckenstein/Crowley attempt on K2, and comes from the location's similarity to another glacial confluence, also named Concordia, in the Bernese Oberland of the Central Alps.

Robert Lerco was the first person to report reaching Concordia, in 1890, followed by William Martin Conway in 1892.

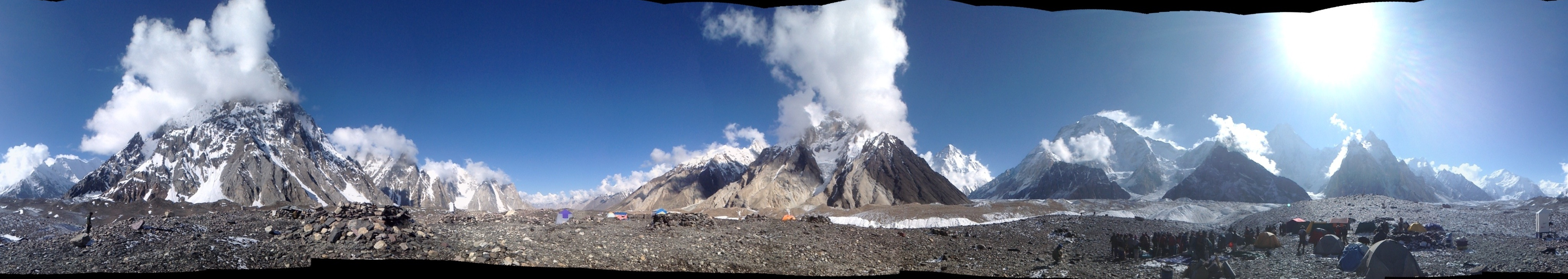
Panoramic view from Concordia.
