= Passu Glacier =

Glacier in Pakistan

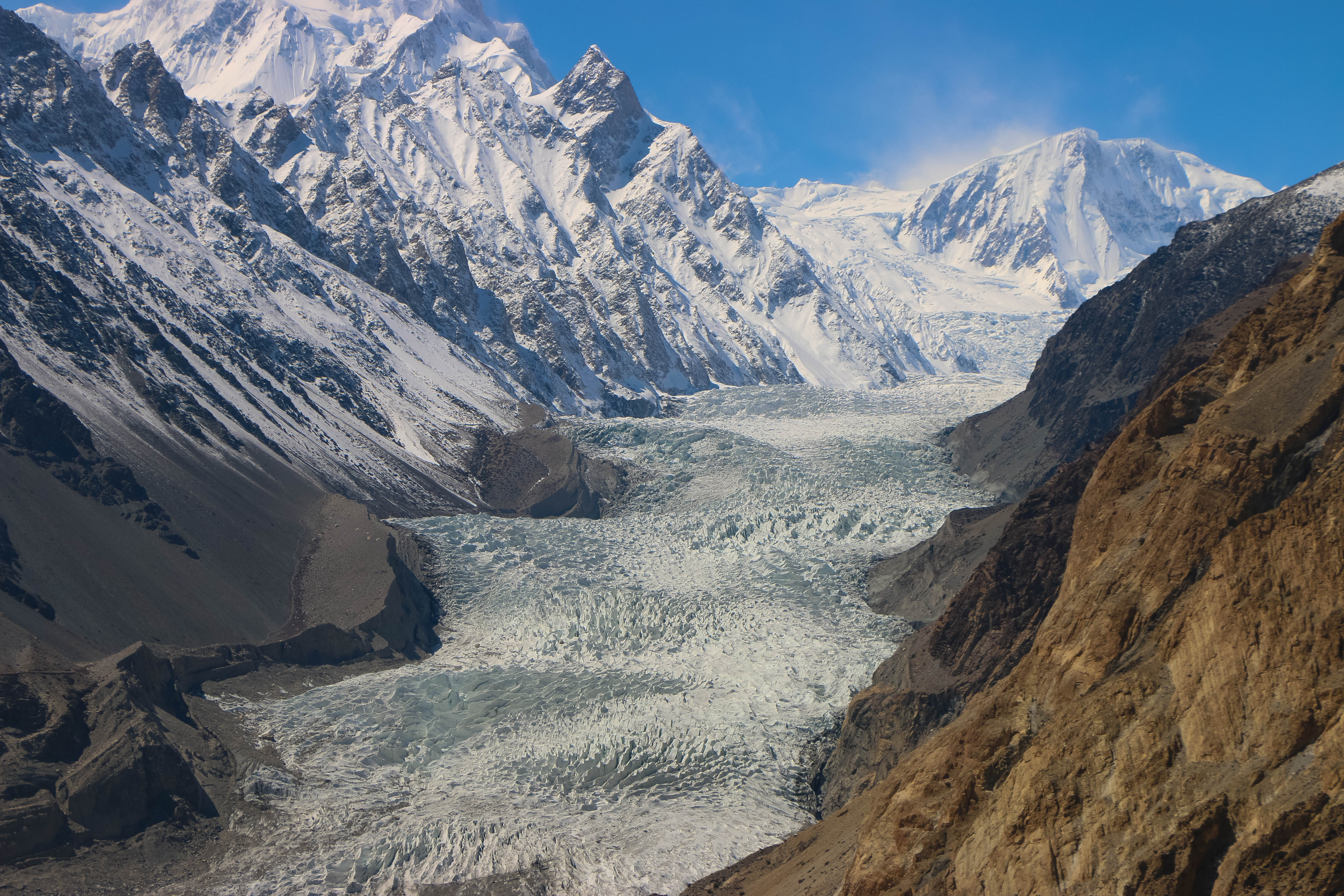
- Passu Glacier

- Location within Karakoram Location within Gilgit Baltistan Location within Pakistan
- Interactive map of Passu Glacier
- Type: Mountain glacier
- Location: Gilgit-Baltistan, Pakistan
- Coordinates: 36°28′N 74°46′E

Passu Glacier is located in the Hunza District of Gilgit-Baltistan, Pakistan, south of Passu village in Upper Hunza (also known as Gojal). Situated in the western Karakoram Range, the glacier lies beneath Passu Peak and is connected to the Batura Glacier along with several others in the Batura Muztagh subrange. Meltwater from the glacier supports local agriculture and nearby settlements, where communities developed a sophisticated irrigation system centuries ago to manage and distribute the water.

== Geography ==
At its front to the east lies Passu Lake, which drains into the Hunza River. The glacier falls under the Northwest Karakoram climatic regime, characterised by maximum precipitation in winter and occasional rainfall in spring and summer.

== History ==
During the British colonial era, explorers and surveyors documented their travels through the Karakoram, providing valuable early observations of the Passu Glacier. The earliest known reference dates to 1925, when Dutch geographer Dr. Philips Christiaan Visser and his wife Jenny Visser-Hooft surveyed about two‑thirds of the glacier during their expedition. Their findings were published in Among the Kara-Korum Glaciers in 1925 (1926).

Later, in May 1932, Major W. R. F. Trevelyan and Captain M. H. Berkeley examined glaciers in the Hunza Valley, including Passu. They described the glacier as "healthy," with clean white ice extending to its snout. They also noted that a cairn erected in 1930 remained intact, suggesting little change in the glacier's position over two years.

== See also ==
- Passu Sar
- List of glaciers
- Batura Glacier
- Passu Peak
