= Snow Dome, Concordia =

Mountain in Pakistan

Snow Dome
- سنو ڈوم
- Location within Pakistan

Highest point
- Elevation: 7,150 m (23,460 ft)
- Listing: Mountains of Pakistan
- Coordinates: 35°36′35″N 76°36′20″E

Geography
- Location: Gilgit–Baltistan, Pakistan
- Parent range: Karakoram, Baltoro Glacier

Climbing
- First ascent: 1957

Snow Dome (Urdu: سنو ڈوم) is a 7,150-metre (23,460 ft) high mountain in the Karakoram range near Concordia in Gilgit–Baltistan, Pakistan. It lies to the east of Chogolisa peak (7,665 m) and southwest of Baltoro Kangri (7,312 m).

Another mountain, located in the Chaprot Pass region of Gilgit–Baltistan, is also called Snow Dome, though that one is of considerably less height at 5,029 m.

== See also ==
- Baltoro Glacier
- Highest Mountains of the World
