= Biarchedi =

Mountain in Pakistan

Biarchedi Peak بیارچیڈی
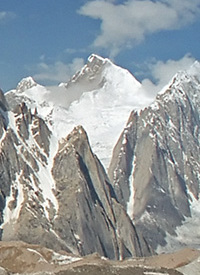
- Biarchedi Peak.

Highest point
- Elevation: 6,781 m (22,247 ft)
- Prominence: 561 m (1,841 ft)
- Listing: List of mountains in Pakistan
- Coordinates: 35°41′18″N 76°23′55″E

Geography
- Location within Pakistan
- Location: Baltoro Glacier, Pakistan
- Parent range: Karakoram

Climbing
- First ascent: 07.1984; Jerzy Kukuczka

Biarchedi Peak (Urdu: بیارچیڈی) is a mountain peak on the south of the Baltoro Glacier in Pakistan.

The peak's first ascent was in a 1984 solo climb by the Polish mountaineer Jerzy Kukuczka.

Masherbrum (7,806 m) is to its southwest and the Mitre Peak (6,010 m) to its east. In its northeast is the Biarchedi Glacier that flows north into the Baltoro Glacier.

== See also ==
- Northern Areas
