= Abruzzi Glacier =

Glacier in Pakistan

- Urdu: آبروزي گلیشیر
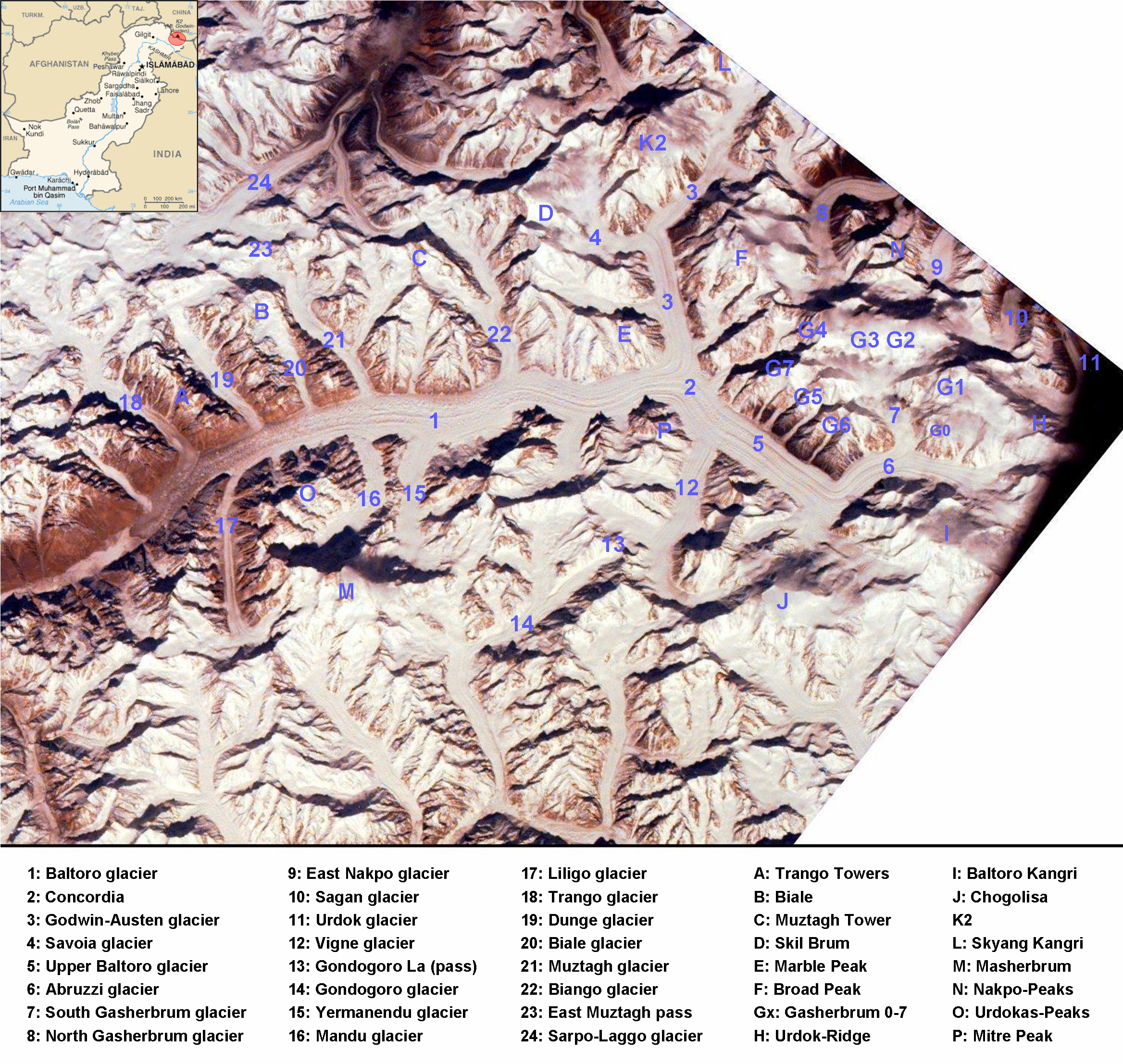
- Baltoro Kangri region from space. Abruzzi Glacier marked # 6.

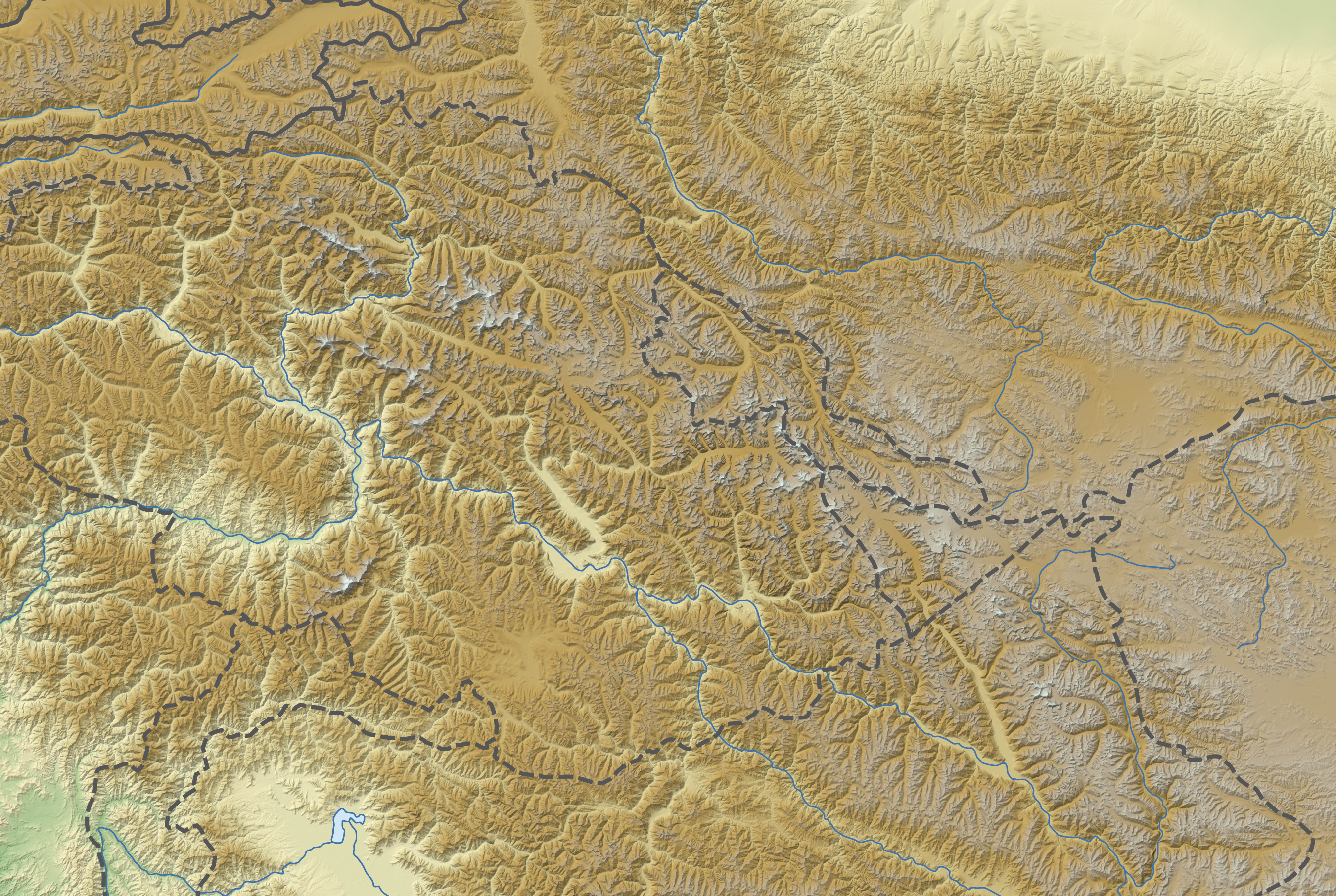
- Location within Karakoram Location within Gilgit Baltistan
- Interactive map of Abruzzi Glacier
- Type: Mountain glacier
- Location: Gilgit-Baltistan, Pakistan.
- Coordinates: 35°40′41″N 76°40′04″E

The Abruzzi Glacier (Urdu: آبروزي گلیشیر) is located north of the Baltoro Kangri in Gilgit-Baltistan, Pakistan. The glacier flows northwest before turning westwards and eventually merges with the Baltoro Glacier, one of the largest glaciers outside of the polar regions. From its upper reaches, the glacier offers striking views of K2, the second-highest mountain in the world and the highest in Pakistan.

The glacier is named after Prince Luigi Amedeo, Duke of the Abruzzi, an Italian mountaineer and Arctic explorer who led a major expedition to the Karakoram in 1909. His team explored the Baltoro and the Godwin-Austen Glaciers in the vicinity of K2, producing valuable geographical and glaciological observations. (Note: Italy's involvement in the Karakoram has continued beyond these early expeditions. Through programmes and partnerships with Pakistani institutions, Italian researchers have pioneered glacier inventories and monitoring initiatives. These collaborations have advanced scientific understanding of glacier dynamics, contributed to preservation efforts, and strengthened water security by addressing the impacts of climate variability on the Indus River system.)

== See also ==
- Baltoro Glacier
- List of glaciers
