= Mitre Peak, Pakistan =

Mountain in Pakistan

Mitre Peak مائٹر چوٹی
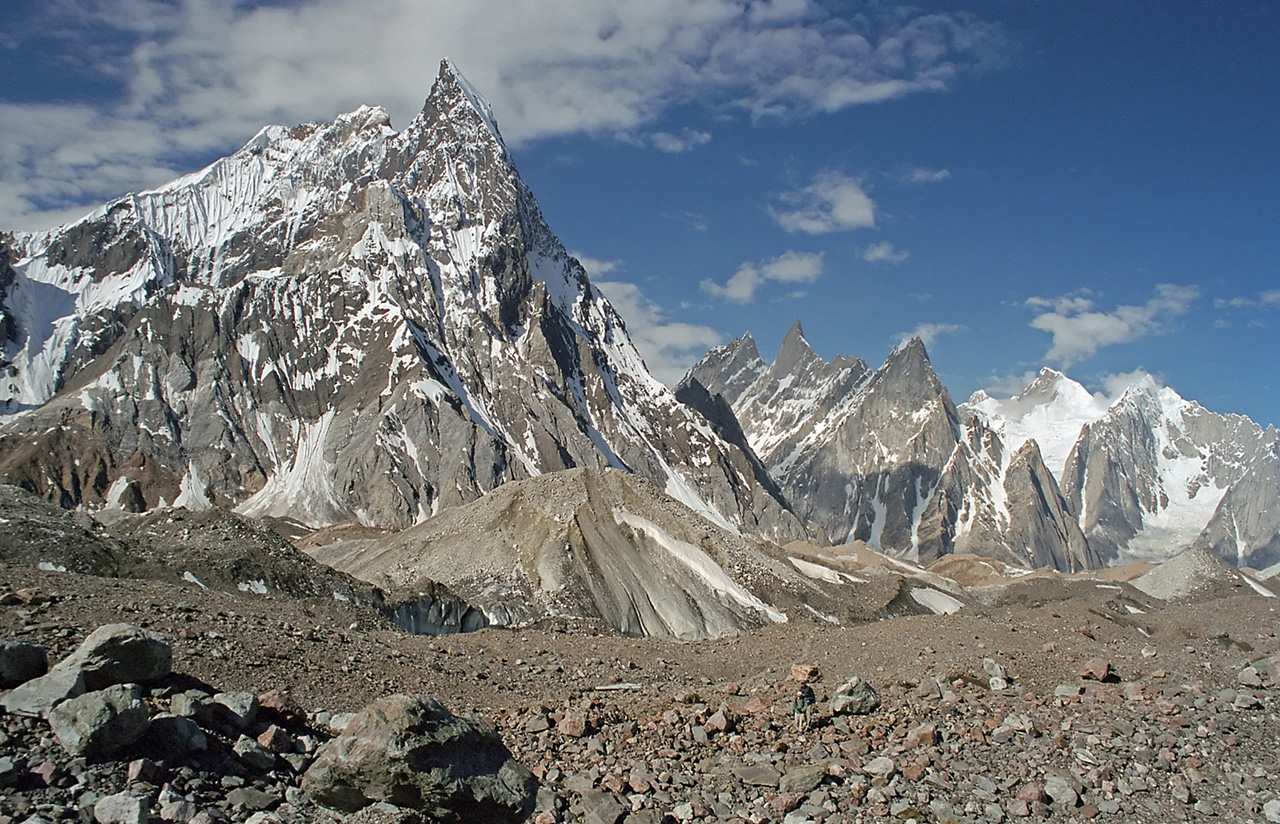
- Mitre Peak from Concordia

Highest point
- Elevation: 6,010 m (19,720 ft)
- Prominence: 725 m (2,379 ft)
- Listing: List of mountains in Pakistan
- Coordinates: 35°42′00″N 76°28′48″E

Geography
- Location within Pakistan
- Location: Concordia, Pakistan
- Parent range: Karakoram

Climbing
- First ascent: 1980 (Ivano Ghirardini)
- Easiest route: rock/snow/ice climb

Mitre Peak (Urdu: مائٹر چوٹی) is a mountain in the Karakoram mountain range near Concordia in Gilgit-Baltistan, Pakistan.

Mitre Peak marks the confluence of the branches of the Baltoro Glacier with the Gasherbrum branch arriving from the SE and the Godwin Austin branch arriving from the NE. It sits across from Broad Peak, the 12th highest mountain on Earth.

The peak has been climbed only once, in the summer of 1980, by the Italian-French mountaineer Ivano Ghirardini.

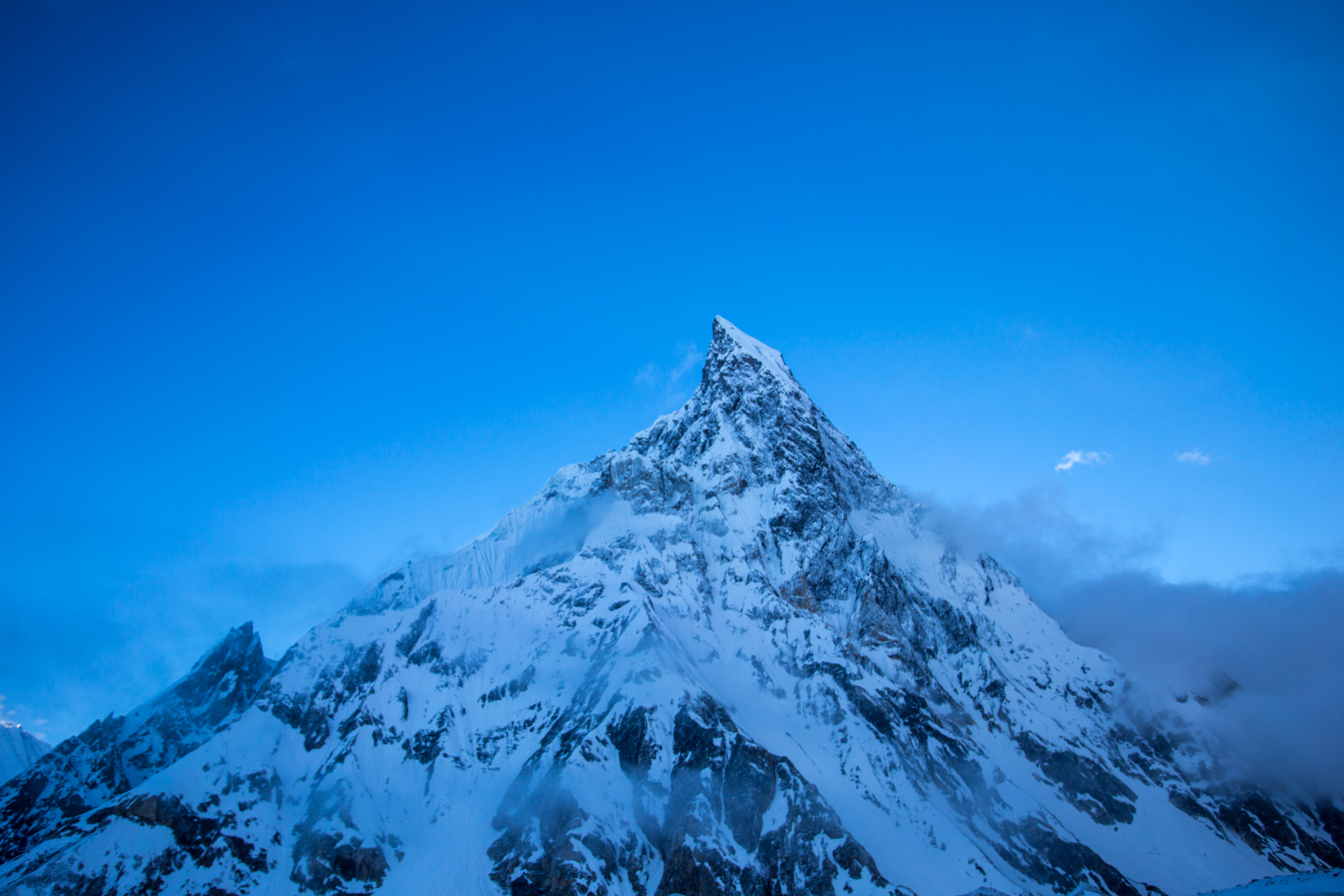
Mitre Peak from Concordia Camp, June 2014
