= Batura Glacier =

Glacier in Pakistan

- بتوراگلیشیئر
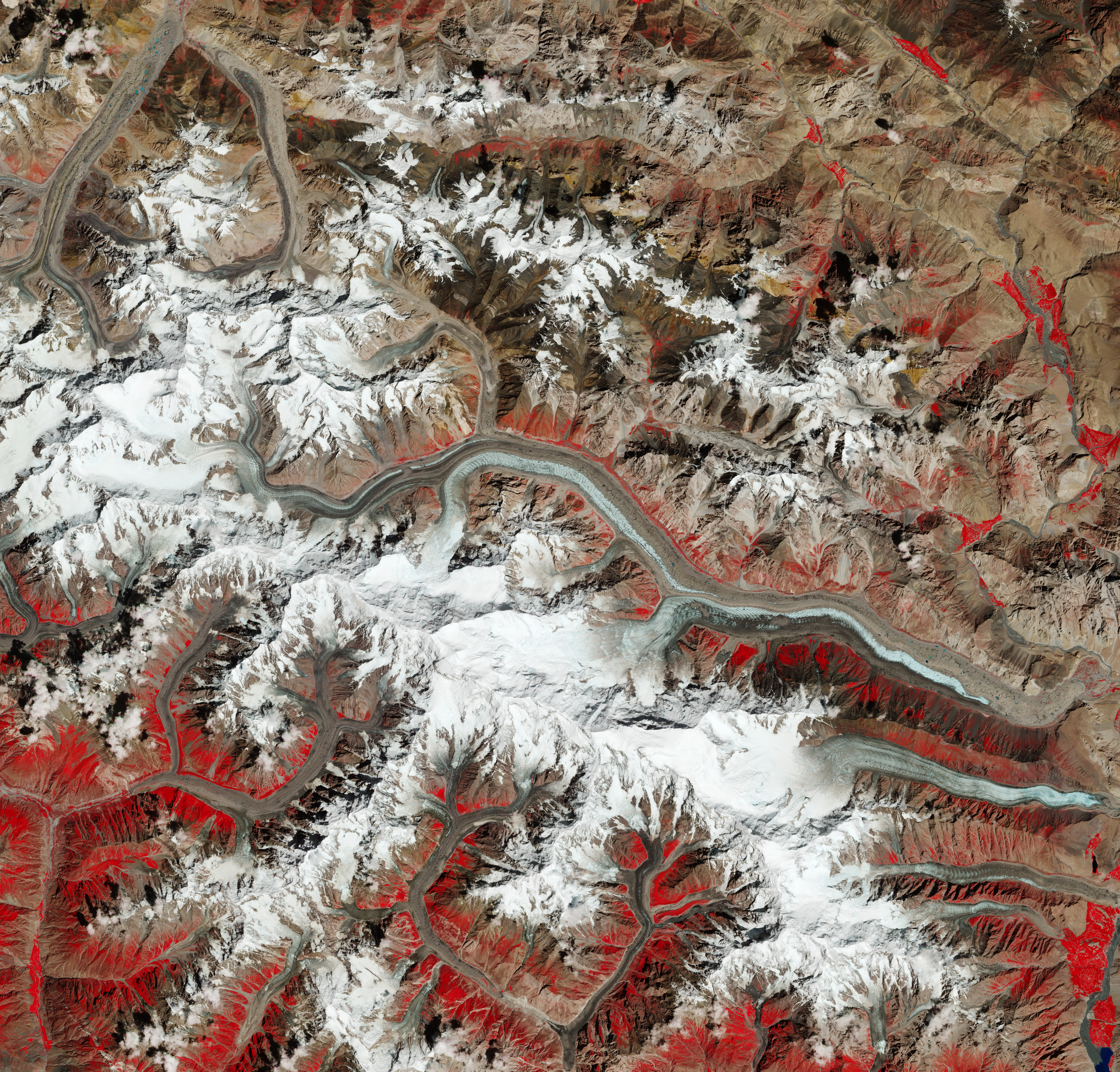
- Satellite imagery of the Batura Glacier as of 2022. The big white area is the Batura Muztagh mountains; the glacier is the long snaky area on the mountains' north side.

- Location within Karakoram Location within Gilgit Baltistan

- Location in Pakistan
- Interactive map of Batura Glacier
- Type: Mountain glacier
- Location: Gilgit Baltistan, Pakistan
- Coordinates: 36°32′N 74°39′E

Batura Glacier (Urdu: بتورا گلیشیر), 57 km (35 mi) long, is one of the largest and longest glaciers outside of the polar regions. It lies in the upper Hunza (Gojal) region of Hunza District, in Gilgit-Baltistan, Pakistan. It is just north of the massifs of Batura, at 7,795 metres (25,574 ft), and Passu, at 7,500 metres (24,600 ft). The glacier flows west to east. The lower portions can be described as a grey sea of rocks and gravelly moraine, bordered by a few summer villages and pastures with herds of sheep, goats, cows and yaks and where roses and juniper trees are common.

The Batura Glacier has been the subject of several studies, both because it has several unusual properties and because it is close to the vital Karakoram Highway. The climate of the deep valleys around the Batura Glacier is dry, with only about 10 cm of precipitation per year. Snowfall up in the mountains is somewhat higher but still fairly low, with around 100-130 cm per year. The local freezing level is about 4,200 m. The glacier's upper reaches are the coldest; it becomes more temperate in its middle and lower parts. Two-thirds of the glacier in these parts is covered by a thick layer of debris, except for a relatively thin 700 m-wide strip of ice that comes within 4 km of the glacier terminus. As of 1984, the glacier terminus was measured to be about 0.5 km above the Karakoram Highway. The glacier has since retreated, with both backwasting and downwasting occurring.

== See also ==
- Batura
- Passu Sar
- List of glaciers
- Batura Muztagh
