= Baltoro Glacier =

Glacier in Pakistan

- བལྟོརོ་གངས།
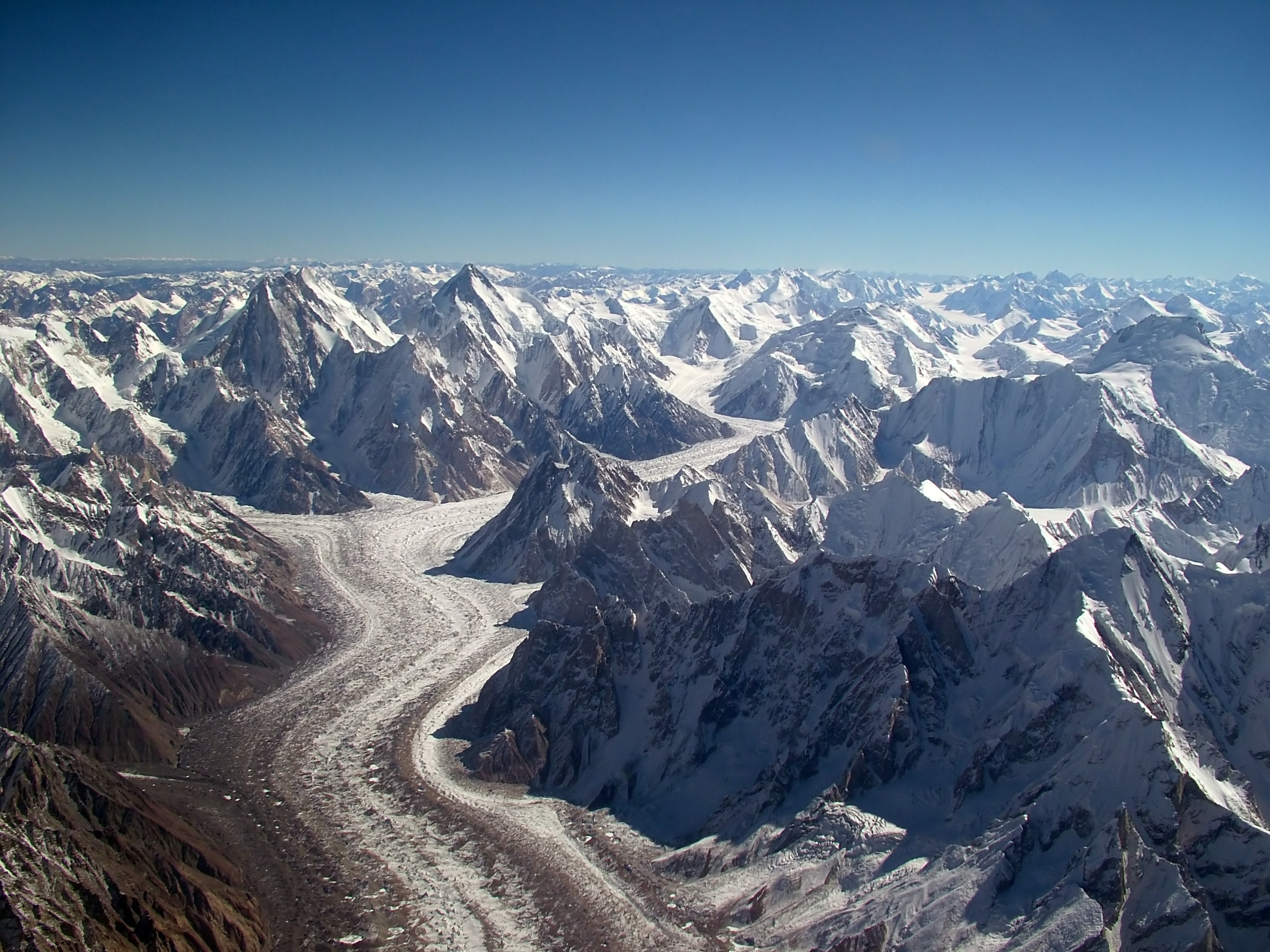
- The Baltoro Glacier from the air, looking east

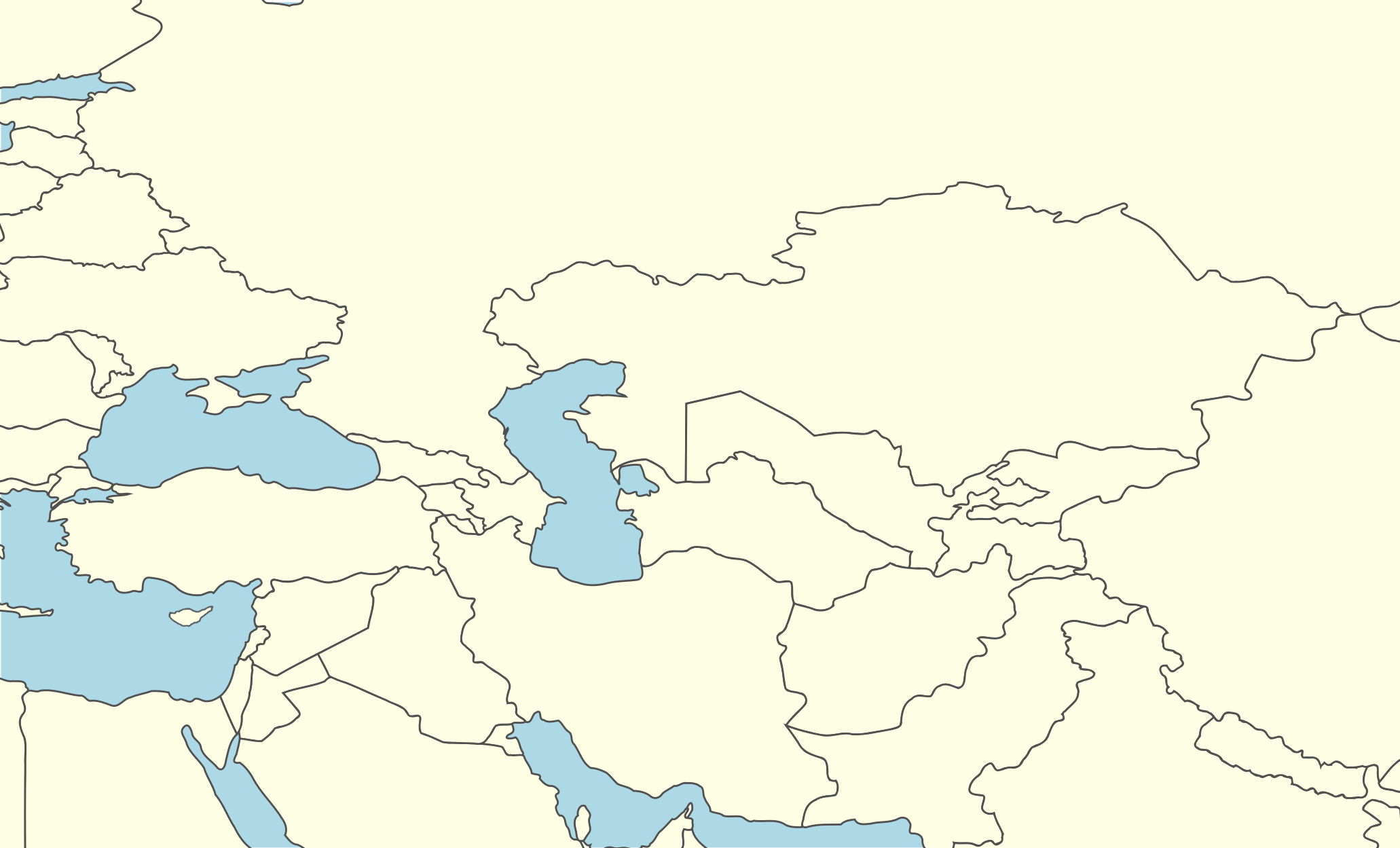
- Location within Karakoram Location within Gilgit Baltistan Location within Pakistan Location within Central Asia
- Interactive map of Baltoro Glacier
- Type: Mountain glacier
- Location: Karakoram range, Gilgit-Baltistan
- Coordinates: 35°44′11″N 76°22′51″E
- Area: 1,500 square kilometres (580 sq mi)
- Length: 63 kilometres (39 mi)

The Baltoro Glacier (Balti: བལྟོརོ་གངས།, romanized: Baltoro gangs, lit. 'Bone breaker';Urdu: بالتورو گلیشیر) is a glacier located in the Shigar District of the Gilgit-Baltistan, a region in Pakistan-administered Kashmir.

The glacier lies in the Karakoram range, and is surrounded by some of the world's highest peaks, including K2 (8,611 metres (28,251 ft)), the second highest mountain on Earth, as well as three other summits above 8,000 meters within a 20-kilometre radius.

Scientific observations between 2001 and 2011 recorded visible changes in the Baltoro, especially near Concordia, where it meets the Godwin-Austen Glacier at 4,600 metres (15,100 ft). Although reductions in snow and ice cover were noted, research indicates that the glacier is not retreating but experiencing surges, shifting and flowing into neighbouring glaciers.

== Geography ==
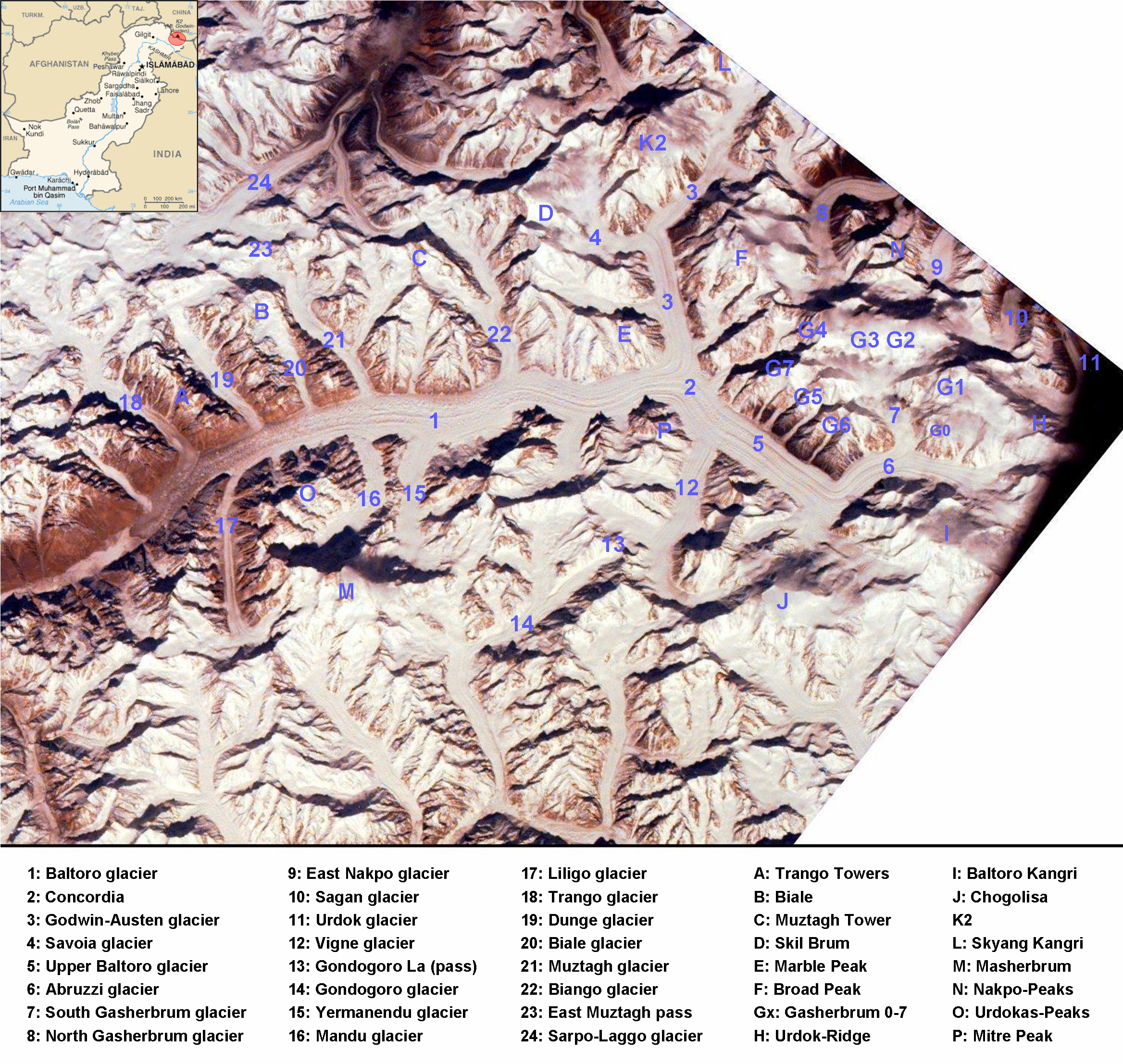
Baltoro ice field as seen from the ISS

The Baltoro Glacier flows through the Karakoram, bordered by the Baltoro Muztagh to the north and east, and the Masherbrum Mountains to the south. To its northeast, it is separated from the Siachen Glacier by the Conway Saddle (or pass).

The glacier forms the source of the Braldo River, which joins the Shigar River, a tributary of the Indus. It is fed by several large tributary glaciers, including the Godwin-Austen Glacier from K2, the Abruzzi and Gasherbrum Glaciers from the Gasherbrum peaks, the Vigne Glacier from Chogolisa, and the Yermandendu Glacier from Masherbrum. The junction of the Baltoro and Godwin-Austen Glaciers, known as Concordia, is a renowned trekking destination, as is the K2 Base Camp.

The glacier's trough is notably wide, with small valley glaciers forming icefalls where they meet the main trunk. Its steep sidewalls bear striations carved by moving ice, while depressions created by glacial movement hold numerous lakes.

The glacier is accessible from the Balti town of Skardu, the principal gateway to the Karakoram.

== Environmental challenges ==
Improved road access has increased tourism, but this growth has also created severe environmental pressures. Littering, inadequate sanitation, and the heavy reliance on overburdened mules due to a shortage of porters have left trekking routes strewn with waste and animal remains. Earlier conservation efforts by the Mountain and Glacier Protection Organisation (MGPO) in the 1990s and 2000s introduced campsites, portable toilets, and waste collection schemes, but conditions have since declined under the management of the Central Karakoram National Park. Accumulated trash, limited community incentives, and ineffective waste disposal have worsened the situation. Current initiatives, such as the United Nations Development Programme's GLOF II project supported by the Green Climate Fund, aim to restore cleanliness, while local residents advocate for systematic annual cleanups under a single responsible authority.

== List of peaks ==
A list of notable peaks adjacent to or near the Baltoro Glacier includes:

- Biarchedi, 6,781 m
- Broad Peak, 12th highest in the world at 8,047 m.
- Chogolisa, 36th highest in the world at 7,665 m.
- Gasherbrum III, 7,946 m. (Often regarded as a subpeak of Gasherbrum II.)
- Gasherbrum II, 13th highest in the world at 8,035 m.
- Gasherbrum IV, 17th highest in the world at 7,932 m.
- Gasherbrum I, 11th highest in the world at 8,080 m.
- K2, 2nd highest in the world at 8611m
- Masherbrum (K1), 22nd highest in the world at 7,821 m.
- Mitre Peak, 6,010 m.
- Muztagh Tower, 7,273 m.
- Snow Dome, 7,160 m.
- Trango Towers, 6,286 m. (Their vertical faces are the world's tallest cliffs.)
- Uli Biaho Tower, 6,417 m.

== Image gallery ==
Looking NE towards K2, at top centre

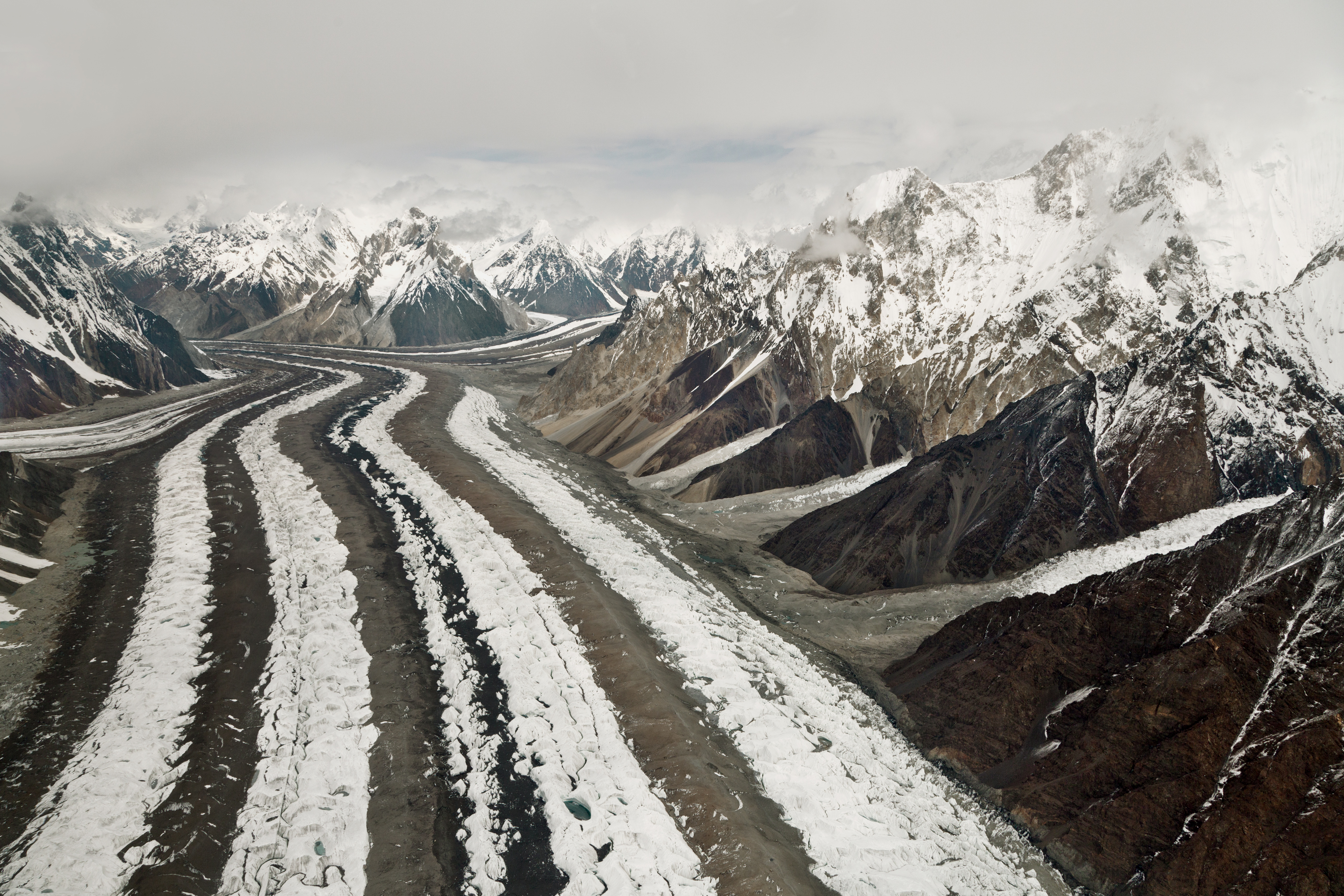
Close-up photo of the glacier

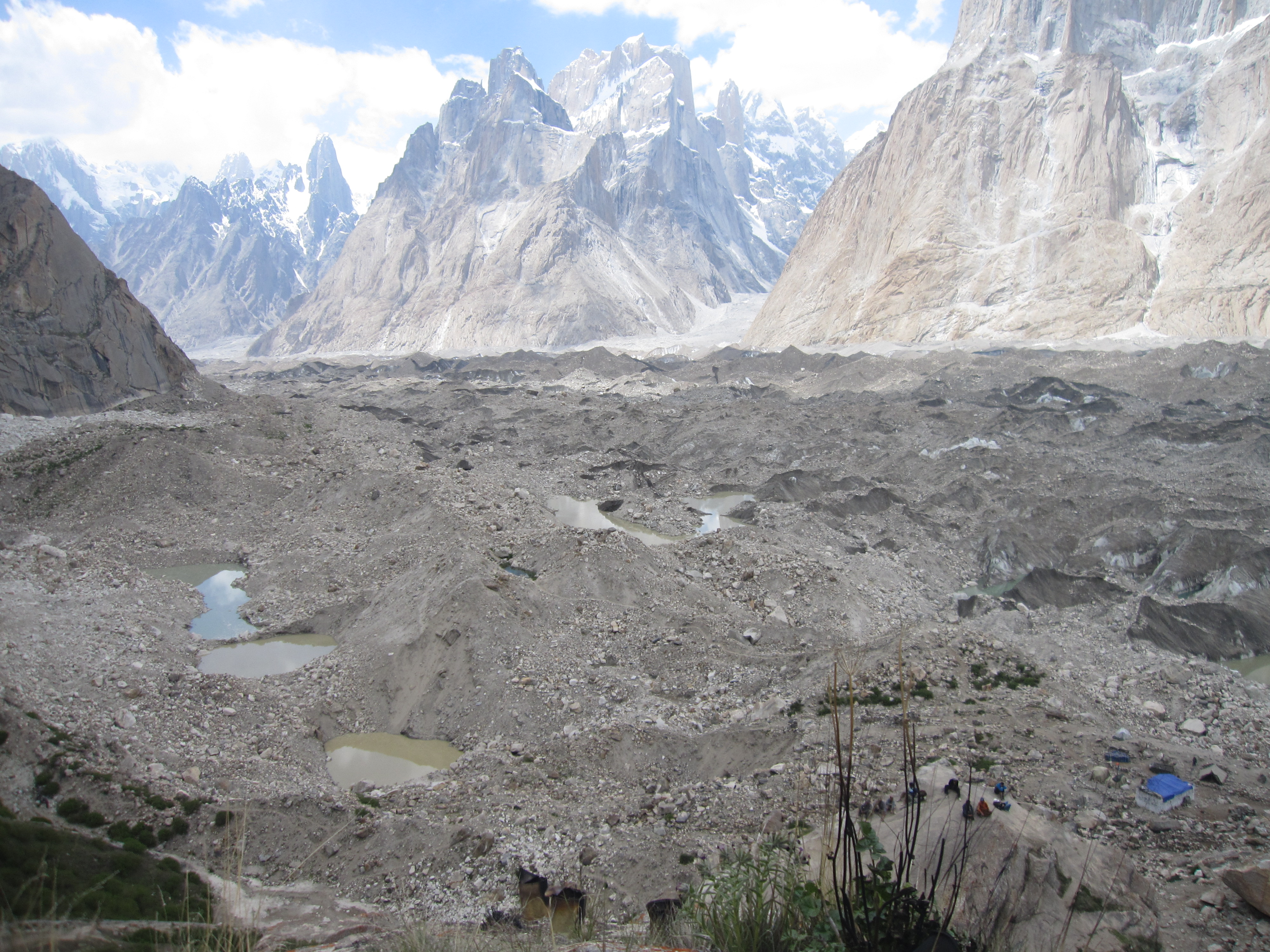
View of the Baltoro Glacier from Urdukas campsite

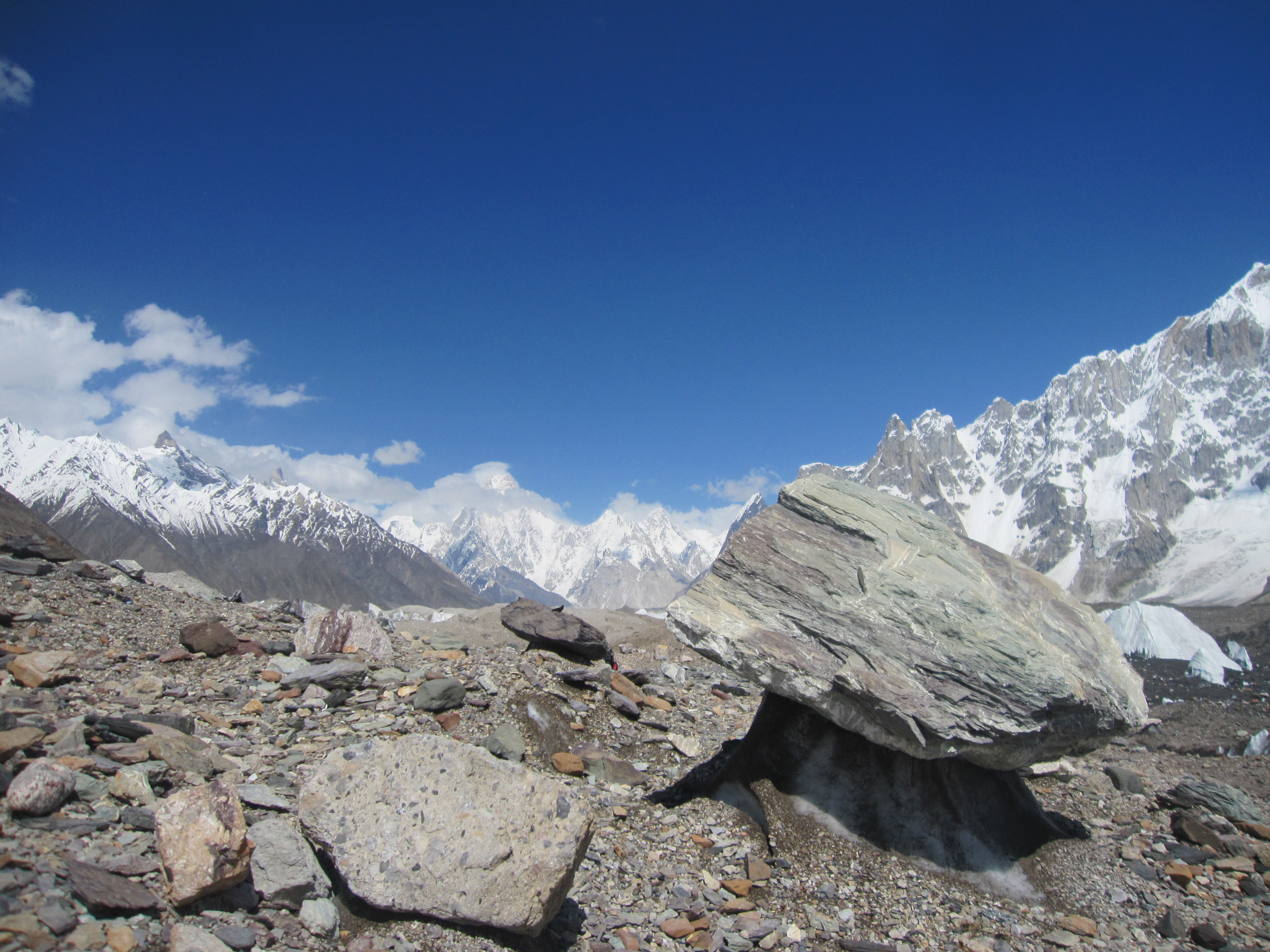
A glacial mushroom on Baltoro Glacier

== See also ==
- Baltoro Muztagh
- Biafo Glacier
- Trango Glacier
- Hainablak Glacier
- Sarpo Laggo Glacier
- Eight-thousander
- List of glaciers
- List of highest mountains
- Northern Areas
