= Paraber Peak =

Peak in Gilgit-Baltistan valley

- Location within Pakistan

Highest point
- Elevation: 6,322 m (20,741 ft); Ranked NA
- Listing: Ultra
- Coordinates: 35°51′24″N 75°03′51″E

Geography
- Location: Gilgit–Baltistan, Pakistan
- Parent range: Karakoram

Paraber Peak (6,322m / 20,741 ft) is a peak in Stak Valley of Gilgit-Baltistan. This mountain is located in the Karakoram range and the prominent landmarks in the vicinity are Haramosh Peak, Laila Peak, Kutia Lungma Glacier and the Chogo Lungma Glacier.
