= Kutwal Lake =

Lake in Gilgit-Baltistan, Pakistan

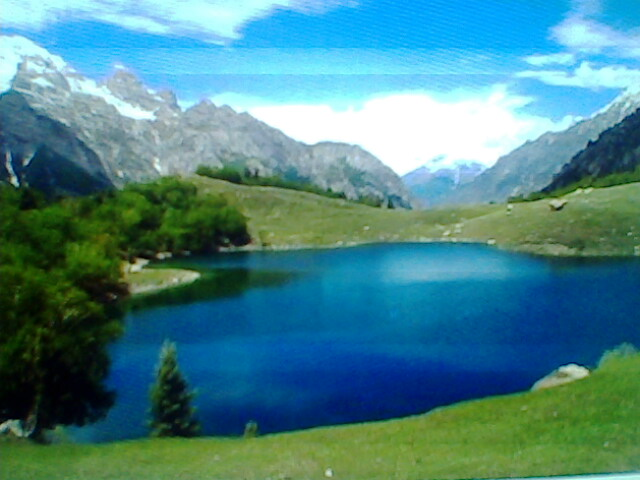

- Location within Gilgit Baltistan Location within Pakistan
- Location: Haramosh, Gilgit, Gilgit Baltistan
- Coordinates: 35°53′37″N 74°53′10″E
- Basin countries: Pakistan

Kutwal Lake is a high-altitude lake located in the Haramosh valley of Gilgit district, in Gilgit-Baltistan, Pakistan. The valley lies about 60 miles to the east of the district capital, Gilgit. The lake is surrounded by several high mountains, including Haramosh Peak, Laila Peak and Dobani Peak.
