= Bagoro =

Ethnic group of Pakistan

بگورو

Total population
- approx. 70,000

Regions with significant populations
- Bagrot valley, Danyor, Oshikhandas, Jalalabad, Bilchar Taisot, Batkor

Languages
- Shina

A Bagoro (plural form: Bagoreh) is a member of an ethnic group living in the Bagrot and Taisot valley, alongside the banks of the river Bagrot, village of Jalaalabad, and in Danyor city.

The group shares the same language, cuisines and traditions.

== Etymology ==
The word etymologically derives from the word bagharey, meaning "distributors" in the Shina language, as the Bagrot Valley was once famous for its agricultural products: crops, fruits and vegetables and its people were famous for their magnanimity and hospitality.
