= Batkor =

Coordinates: 35.8800°N 74.4930°E

Batkor بٹکور
- Village
- Etymology: Baht means stone, kor means cave
- Interactive map of Batkor
- Country: Pakistan
- Autonomous region: Gilgit-Baltistan
- District/Division: Gilgit
- Tehsil: Danyor
- Demonym: Bagoreh

Batkor is a small village located on the top a foothill near Jalaalabad, in the Gilgit District of Gilgit-Baltistan, in northern Pakistan. In the sectarian violence of 1988, Batkor village was also burnt down.

== Places nearby ==
- Bagrot Valley
- Sectarian violence in Pakistan (1988)
