= Malubiting =

Mountain in Pakistan

- مالوبیتنگ
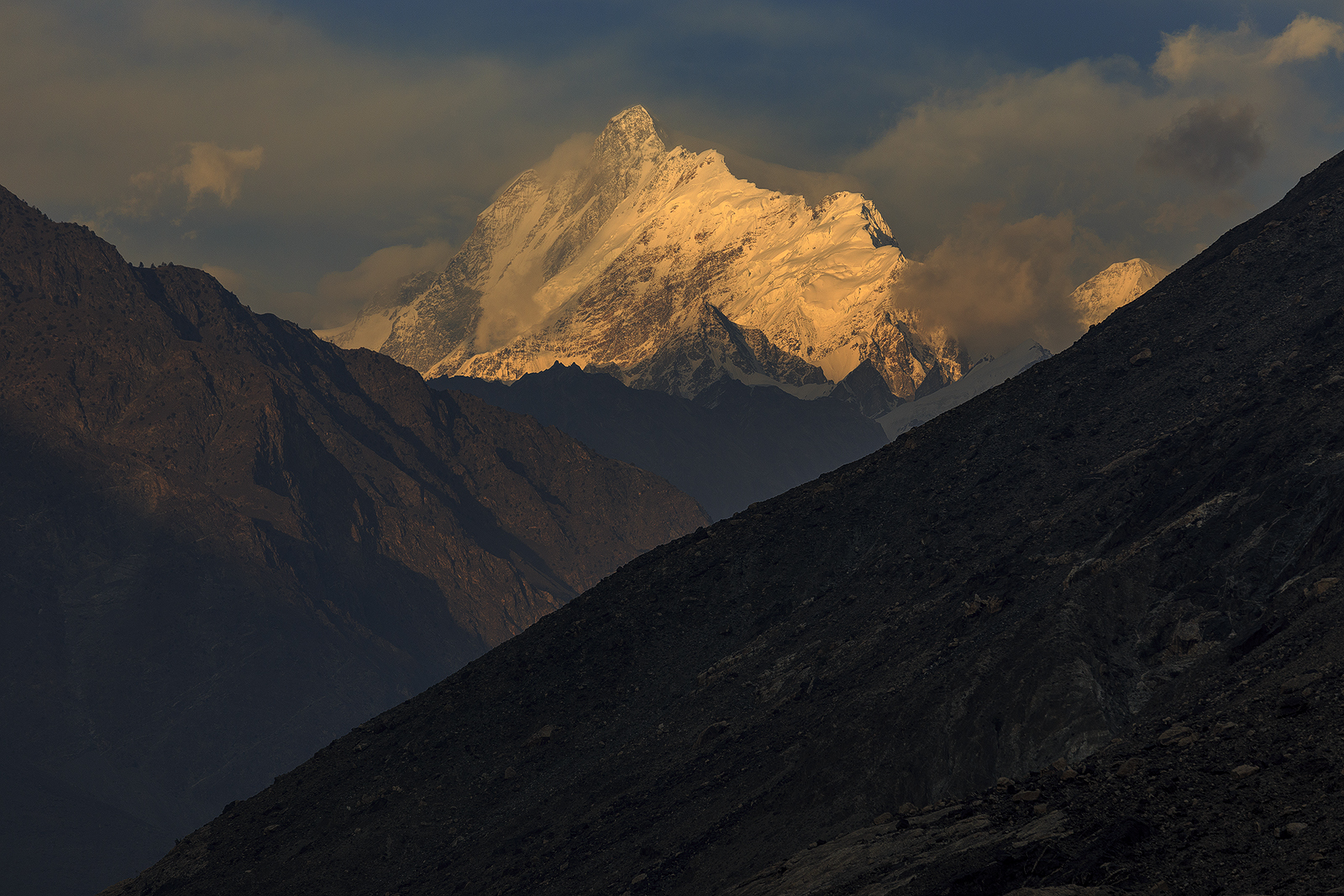
- Malubiting in 2017

Highest point
- Elevation: 7,458 m (24,469 ft); Ranked 58th
- Prominence: 2,193 m (7,195 ft)
- Listing: Mountains of Pakistan; Ultra
- Coordinates: 36°02′20″N 74°54′03″E

Geography
- Location within Pakistan Location within Gilgit Baltistan
- The major peaks in Karakoram are rank identified by height. Legend: 1：K2; 2：Gasherbrum I, K5; 3：Broad Peak; 4：Gasherbrum II, K4; 5：Gasherbrum III, K3a; 6：Gasherbrum IV, K3; 7：Distaghil Sar; 8：Kunyang Chhish; 9：Masherbrum, K1; 10：Batura Sar, Batura I; 11：Rakaposhi; 12：Batura II; 13：Kanjut Sar; 14：Saltoro Kangri, K10; 15：Batura III; 16： Saser Kangri I, K22; 17：Chogolisa; 18：Shispare; 19：Trivor Sar; 20：Skyang Kangri; 21：Mamostong Kangri, K35; 22：Saser Kangri II; 23：Saser Kangri III; 24：Pumari Chhish; 25：Passu Sar; 26：Yukshin Gardan Sar; 27：Teram Kangri I; 28：Malubiting; 29：K12; 30：Sia Kangri; 31：Momhil Sar; 32：Skil Brum; 33：Haramosh Peak; 34：Ghent Kangri; 35：Ultar Sar; 36：Rimo Massif; 37：Sherpi Kangri; 38：Yazghil Dome South; 39：Baltoro Kangri; 40：Crown Peak; 41：Baintha Brakk; 42：Yutmaru Sar; 43：K6; 44：Muztagh Tower; 45：Diran; 46：Apsarasas Kangri I; 47：Rimo III; 48：Gasherbrum V; Location in Gilgit-Baltistan
- Location: Gilgit–Baltistan, Pakistan
- Parent range: Rakaposhi-Haramosh Mountains, Karakoram

Climbing
- First ascent: 1971 by K. Pirker, H. Schell, H. Schindlbacher, H. Sturm
- Easiest route: glacier/snow/ice climb

Malubiting
- Traditional Chinese: 馬魯畢庭峰
Transcriptions

Malubiting (Urdu: مالوبیتنگ), also known as Malubiting West, ranks as the second highest peak between the Haramosh and Hispar valleys in the Karakoram range in Pakistan. It is situated between Bilchar Dobani and Haramosh Peak, in the Gilgit-Baltistan region.

== Location ==
Malubiting is situated at the core of the Rakaposhi-Haramosh Mountains, which tower over the northern bank of the Indus River. It is located approximately 50 km to the east of Gilgit, the principal town in the area. To the southwest, Malubiting ascends sharply above the Haramosh Jutial village along the banks of the Phuparash River, and to the east, the extensive Chogo Lungma Glacier originates from its slopes.

== Climbing history ==
Malubiting was unsuccessfully attempted in 1955, 1959, 1968, 1969, 1970, and 1971 before the first ascent in 1971. In that year an Austrian team led by Horst Schindlbacher reached the summit on August 23 via the Northeast Ridge, ascending the North Peak and skirting the Central Peak on the way.

According to the Himalayan Index, there has been only one additional ascent, by a Swiss-German team in 1997, via the original route. (There may, however, have been other ascents that did not make it into the Index.)
