= Bilchar Dobani =

Mountain peak in Gilgit-Baltistan

Dobani Peak بلچھار دوبانی
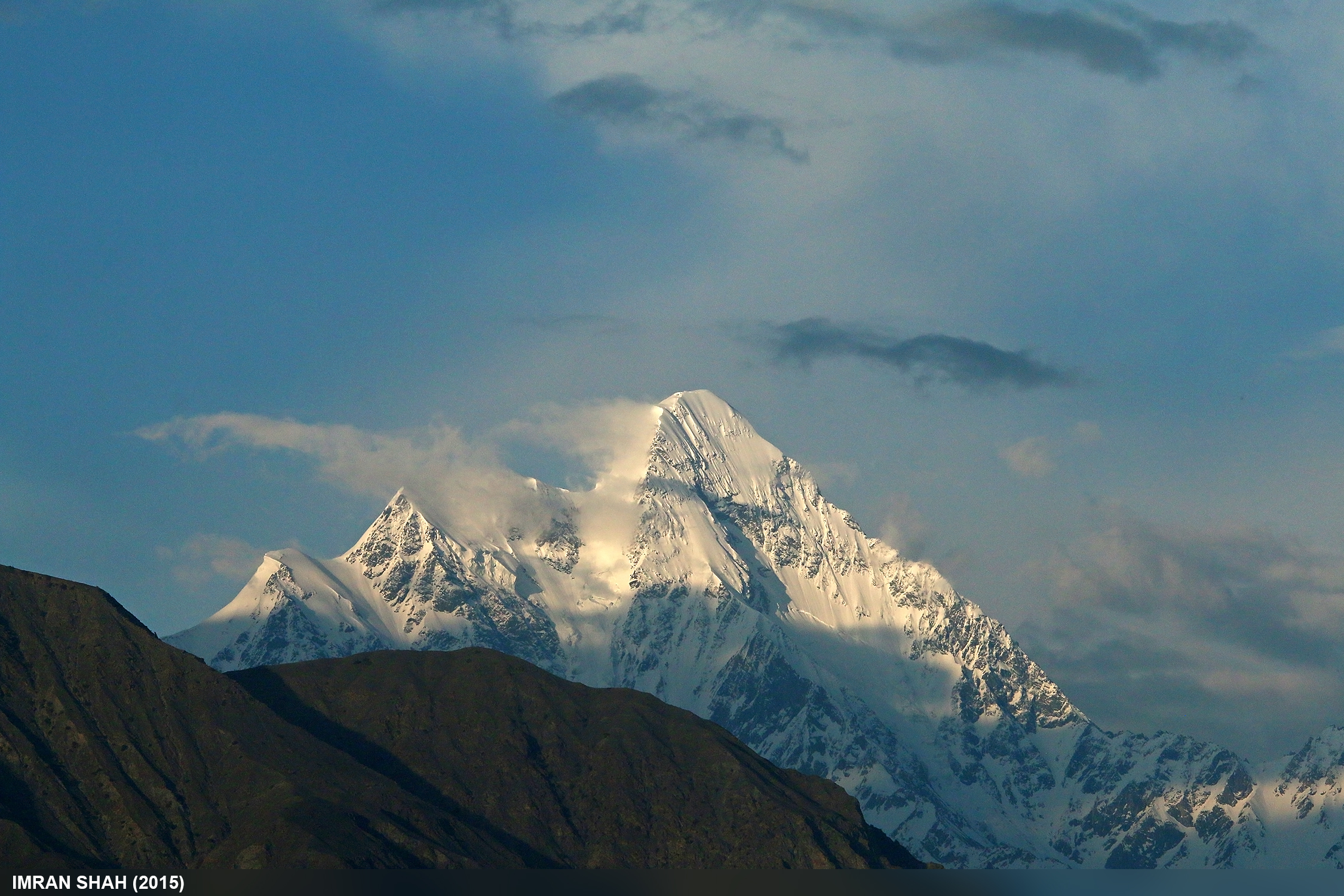
- Bilchar Dobani from Jutial (near Gilgit)

Highest point
- Elevation: 6,143 m (20,154 ft)
- Coordinates: 35°57′20.5″N 74°37′59.0″E

Naming
- Native name: Bilchar-Dobani (Urdu)

Geography
- Location within Pakistan Location within Gilgit Baltistan
- Location: Bagrot Valley, Gilgit–Baltistan, Pakistan
- Parent range: Karakoram

Climbing
- First ascent: Isao Ikeuchi and Masaru Hashimoto on 9 June 1979

Bilchar Dobani or Dobani Peak (Urdu: بلچھار دوبانی) is a 6,143-metre (20,154 ft) mountain peak located between Bilchar, Taisot, Haramosh and Bagrote valley, in Gilgit district of Gilgit-Baltistan, in Pakistan.

== Location ==
Part of the Karakoram range, the mountain is located as an isolated subrange southeast of the Rakaposhi subrange and southwest of Haramosh Mountains. The western face of Dobani Peak is located in the Tesot valley, and to the north of it is the Bagrot valley. In the northwest of the mountain is the Haramosh mountains range. The mountain is 29 km (18 mi) east of the city of Gilgit. The Bagrot Valley runs along the western flank of Bilchar Dobani.

== First ascent ==
The Bilchar Dobani was first climbed by Japanese mountaineers Isao Ikeuchi and Masaru Hashimoto via the west face and northern ridge on 9 June 1979.

== See also ==
- Jalalabad
- Danyor
- Oshikhandass

== Gallery ==
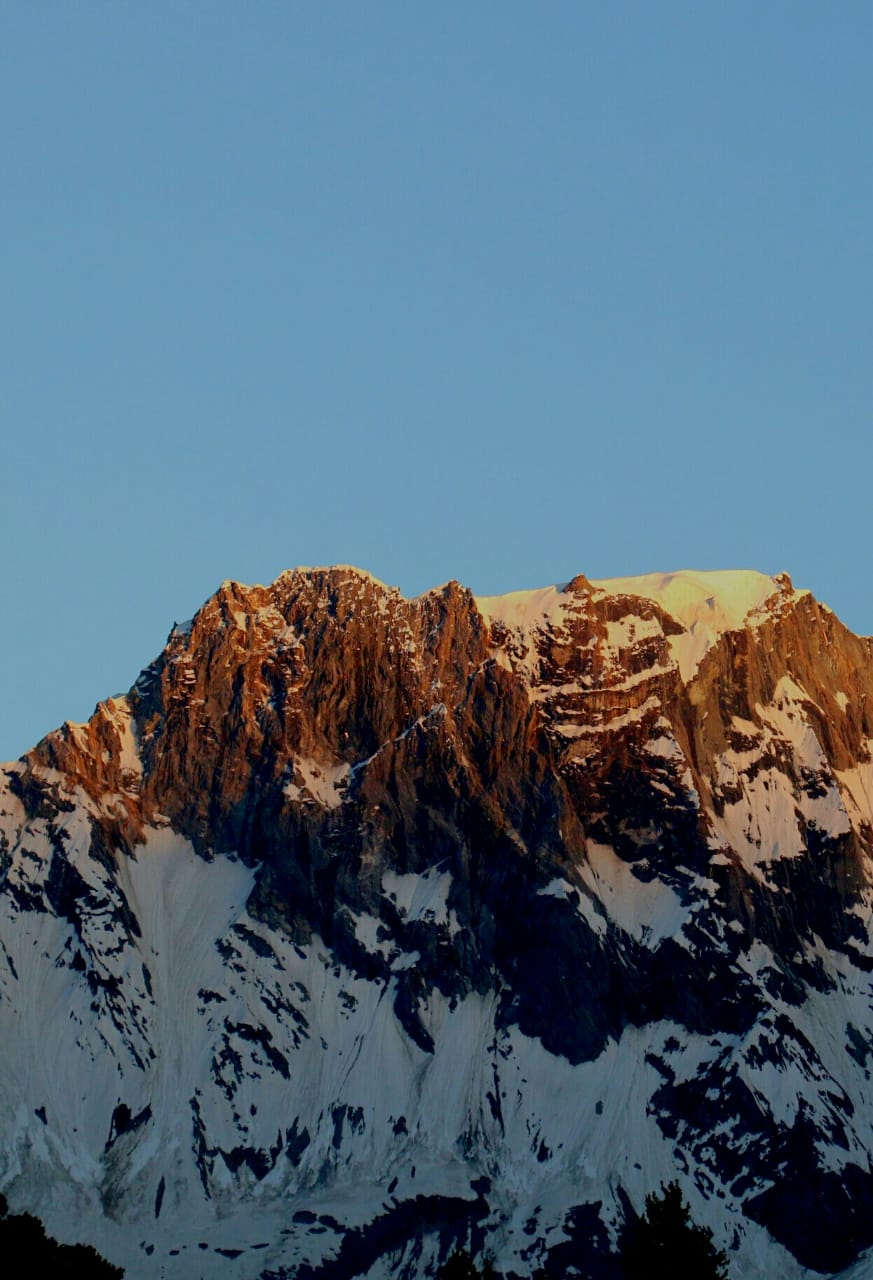
Sunset on Dubani

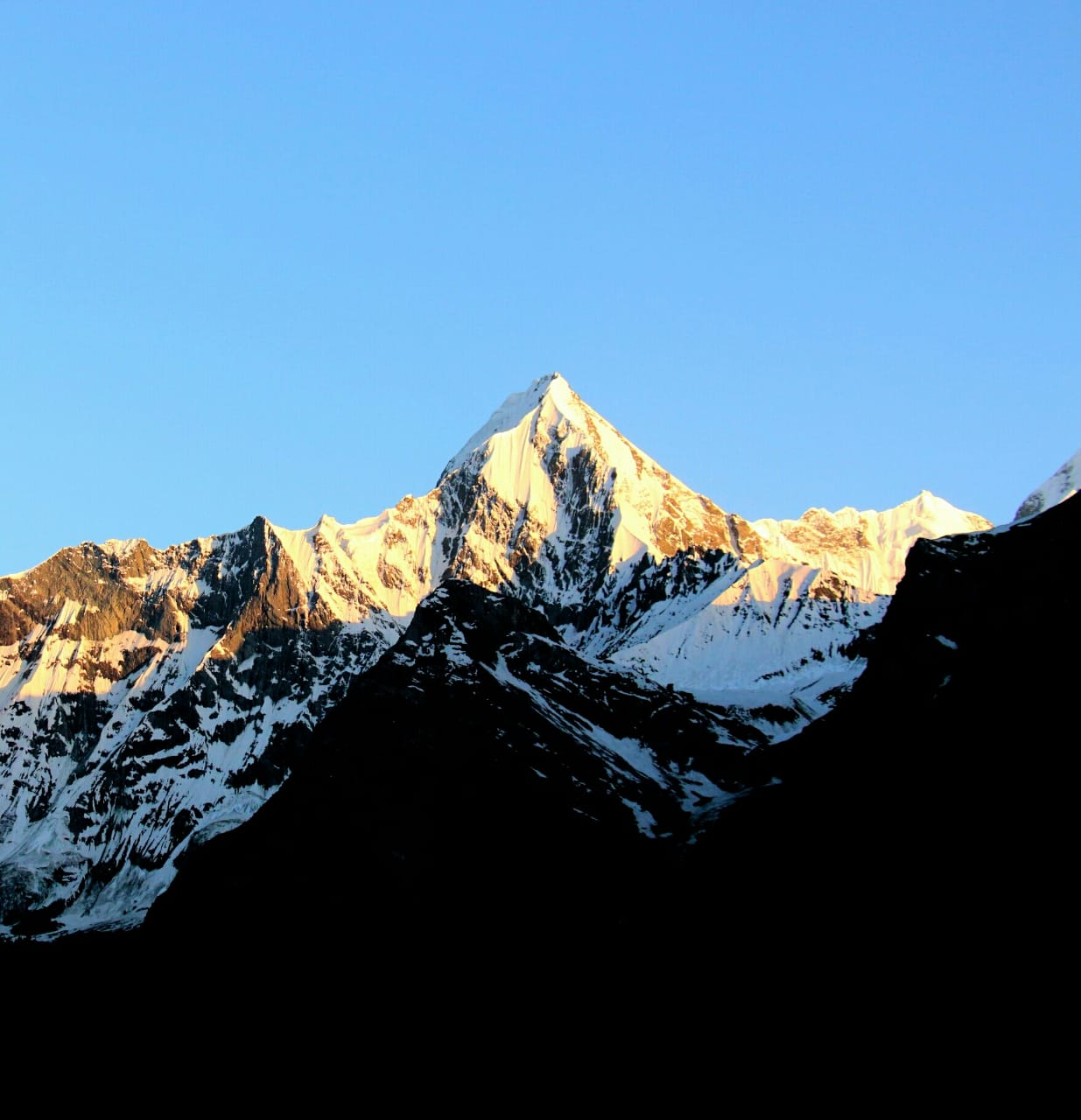
Sunset on Dubani from south side
