= Rakaposhi-Haramosh Mountains =

Subrange of the Karakoram mountain range

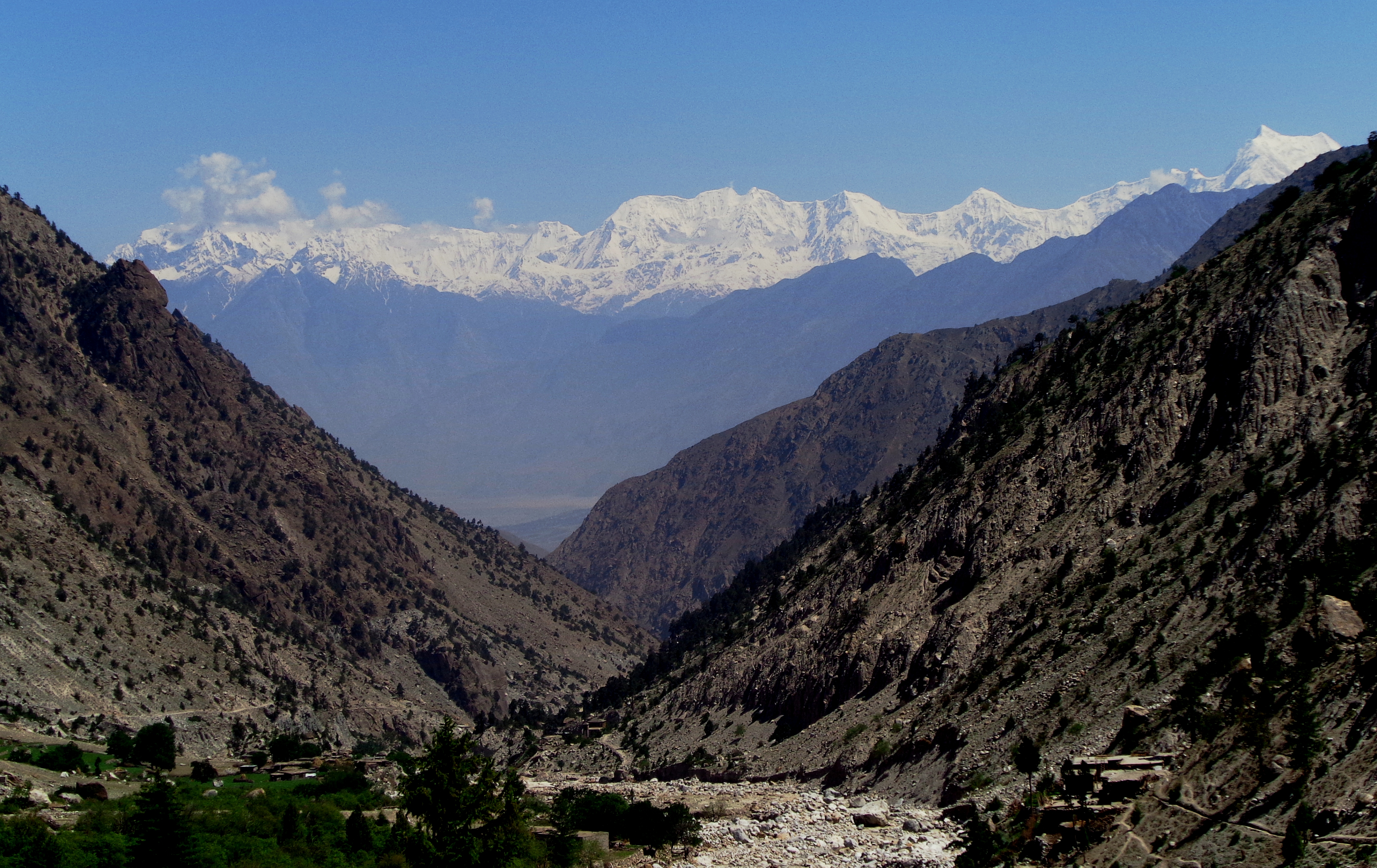

Highest point
- Peak: Rakaposhi
- Elevation: 7,788 metres (25,551 ft)
- Coordinates: 36°02′N 74°44′E

Geography
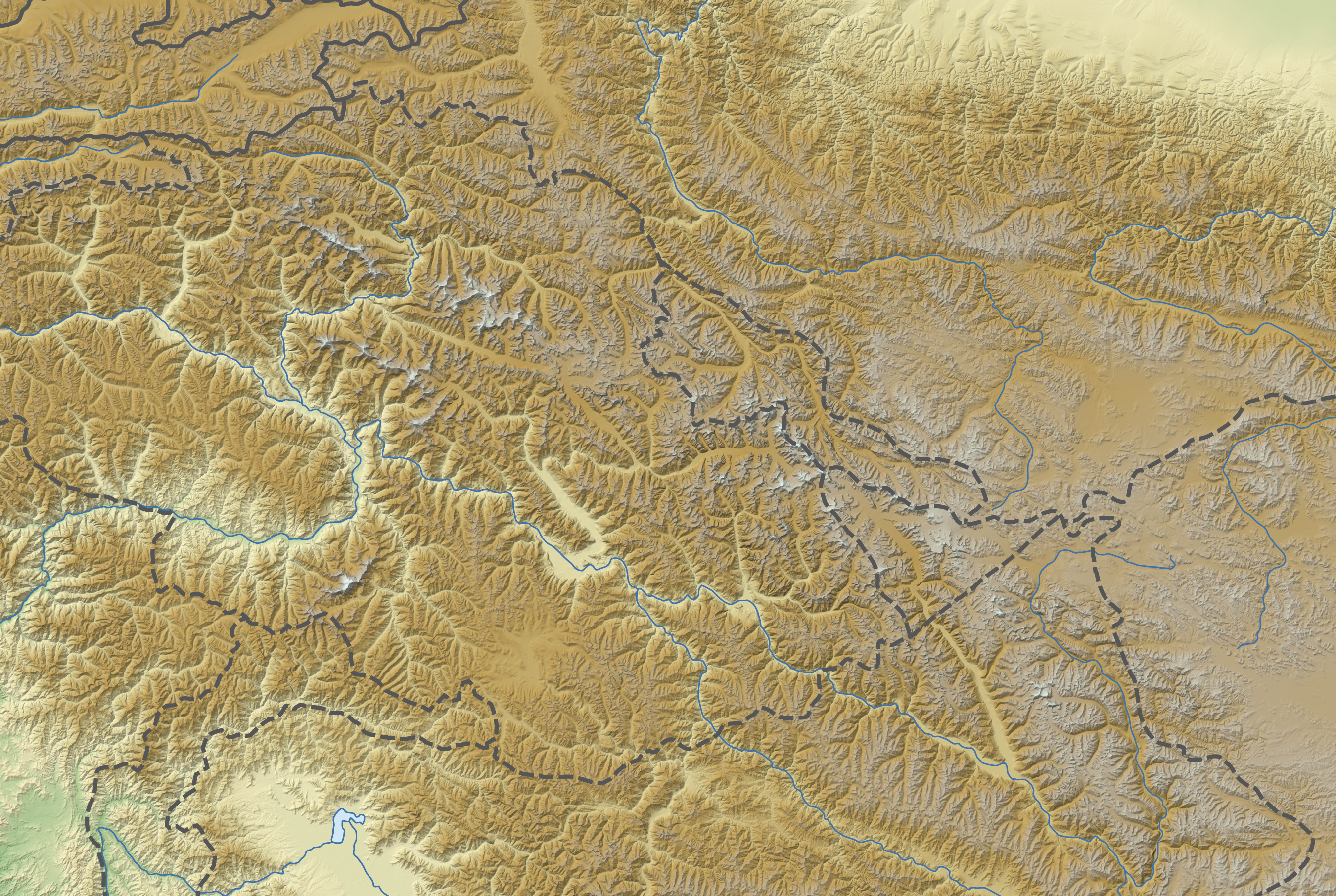
- Location within Karakoram Location within Gilgit Baltistan
- Country: Pakistan
- Regions: Gilgit-Baltistan
- Parent range: Karakoram

The Rakaposhi-Haramosh Mountains are a subrange of the Karakoram range. They are located in the Bagrot Valley in the Gilgit and Nagar districts of the Gilgit-Baltistan region, Pakistan.

== Geography ==
Rakaposhi-Haramosh Mountains are bordered by Barpu and the Chogo Lungma glaciers in the north, the Shigar River in the east, the Gilgit and Indus rivers in the south, and the Hunza River in the west.

The two namesake peaks, Rakaposhi (7,788 m/25,551 ft) and Haramosh (7,409 m/24,308 ft), are among the most prominent in the world in terms of rise above local terrain, due to their positions near very low valleys. Rakaposhi rises dramatically above a bend in the Hunza River, forming the western anchor of the range, while Haramosh stands on the north side of the Indus River, in the south-central portion of the range.

== Selected peaks ==
Mountain	Height (m)	Height (ft)	Coordinates	Prominence (m)	Parent mountain	First ascent	Ascents (attempts)
Rakaposhi	7,788	25,551	36°08′33″N 74°29′21″E	2,818	K2	1958	8 (13)
Malubiting	7,458	24,469	36°00′06″N 74°52′33″E	2,193	Rakaposhi	1971	2 (6)
Haramosh	7,409	24,308	35°50′24″N 74°53′51″E	2,277	Malubiting	1958	4 (3)
Diran	7,266	23,839	36°07′19″N 74°39′40″E	1,325	Malubiting	1968	12 (8)

== See also ==
- List of highest mountains
