= Stak Valley =

Valley in Gilgit-Baltistan, Pakistan

Stak Valley استک نالہ
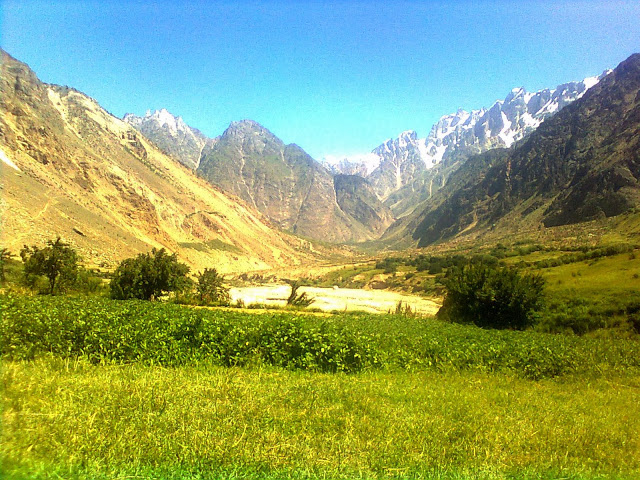
- Nickname: Staq (ستق)
- Interactive map of Stak Valley
- Coordinates: 35°29′49″N 75°25′45″E
- Country: Pakistan
- Province: Gilgit-Baltistan
- District: Skardu
- Tehsil: Roundu Valley
- Time zone: UTC+5 (PST)
- Website: www.trangotour.com

Stak Valley (Urdu: استک نالہ, Balti: སྟཀ ནལ་) is a valley in the Roundu Subdivision of District Skardu, in the Gilgit-Balitistan territory of Pakistan. The valley is on the right bank of the Indus River, between the cities of Skardu and Giligit. The valley is the biggest valley in term of area and population in Roundu subdivision. The valley has been one of the very important regions of the area in term of history and geological formation.

== Geography ==
Stak Valley is situated in the middle of Skardu and Gilgit city on the right bank of the Indus River and Gilgit-Skardu Road. In the east of the Stak Valley lies the Askore valley and Thowar Valley. In the west are the Tooklano and Chamachoo. In the south there is Indus River and Ganji Valley just opposite to the Stak valley across the Indus river. In the north and northwest there is Haramosh and Kutia Glacier and likewise in the northeast the Goropha glacier.

The prominent landmarks around the Stak valley are: Kutia Lungma Glacier, Goropha Glacier (which joins the Chogo Lungma Glacier), Haramosh Peak (7,397 m, 24,270 ft), Pharabar Peak (60,321 m 20,740 ft), Stak-La (Stak Mountain Pass 4,601 m, 15,491 ft) and some other peaks (Shinka, Mashika, Korang Kar) which are about 6,000 m (20,000 ft). The Stak River originates from the Stak-La and joins by Goropha, Kutia and Tooklano Streams and falls in Indus River after completing a course of about 30 km. The Stak River bisects the Stak Valley into two halves. One half starts from Rgialmokaza to Skangbudas and the other side starts from Khirzang to Tookla. Tookla is the last village of Stak, which is partly destroyed by a massive flood in 1999 which caused a huge destruction in the area, destroying the Gamba Tookla completely and Gongma Tookla partially. According to Geologists most of the villages are formed by the moraines, although the valley is one of the fertile valleys of the Roundu Subdivision.
