= Ned Gillette =

American skier and explorer (1945–1998)

- Born: Edward French Gillette; May 5, 1945; Barre, Vermont, U.S.
- Died: August 5, 1998 (aged 53); Haramosh Valley, Gilgit-Baltistan, Pakistan-administered Kashmir
- Cause of death: Gunshot wound
- Education: Dartmouth College; University of Colorado (MBA; dropped out)
- Spouse: Susan Patterson (m. 1990)

Edward French "Ned" Gillette (May 5, 1945 – August 5, 1998) was an American Olympic skier, journalist and explorer. In 1998 he was killed by bandits while mountaineering with his wife Susan Patterson in the Haramosh Valley of Gilgit-Baltistan in Pakistan-administered Kashmir.

== Early life ==
Edward French Gillette was born on May 5, 1945 in Barre, Vermont, USA, to Janet and Bob Gillette. His father was chairman of the National Life Insurance Company of Vermont. His father taught him to ski from the age of three, and took Ned and his sister Debbie to Quissett Harbor in Cape Cod, where Ned learned to sail. He attended Holderness School, New Hampshire from 1959 to 1963, where he first took up cross-country skiing. He graduated from Dartmouth College in 1967, where he was captain of the college ski team and was the 1967 NCAA cross-country ski champion. While at Dartmouth, he was a member of Theta Delta Chi and the Casque and Gauntlet senior society. After graduating from Dartmouth he was chosen for the US Nordic ski team to compete at the 1968 Winter Olympics, but his decision to disregard training in favor of visiting Norway meant he was not entered for any competitions by his coaches, and was instead a noncompeting substitute.

After the Olympics, Ned worked for the International Paper Company and was in a management training program for a year and a half. In 1972 he began an MBA program at the University of Colorado, but dropped out after the first day.

== Career ==
Gillette honed his skiing and rock-climbing skills while working in Yosemite, and in 1972 Ned and a group of friends from Yosemite set off on a 30 day ski traverse of the Brooks Mountain range in Alaska, covering approximately 1000 km. In 1975 he made a 250 km ski traverse of the Mount Elias range along the Alaska-Canada border. He later made an 800 km ski traverse of Robeson Channel and Ellesmere Island in Canada, and a 1979 midwinter ski traverse of the Southern Alps of New Zealand.

In 1977, Ned Gillette co-authored the Nordic Skiing guide Cross-Country Skiing (published in 1979) while working as Director of Skiing at the Trapp Family Ski Touring Centre in Stowe, Vermont.

In 1978, Gillette led an expedition alongside Galen Rowell that completed the first one-day ascent of Mount McKinley in Alaska. In 1980, Ned led a team which achieved the first 500 km ski crossing of the Karakoram range, during which they climbed to almost 6,900 meters while carrying 55 kg sleds. Shortly after, Ned climbed China's 7,546 meter Muztagh Ata, and became the first person to ski down a peak over 7,500 meters. Between 1981 and 1982 Ned and five friends circumnavigated Mount Everest, journeying through Tibet and Nepal, and making a winter ascent of Mount Pumori. This expedition was underwritten by Camel cigarettes, and between the expedition's two segments Ned flew to Las Vegas to promote a sponsor at a trade show. In 1984 he became the first person to telemark ski down Aconcagua, the highest peak in South America. He later crossed the Ruwenzori Mountains of East Africa.

In 1988, Gillette and three companions became the first to row across the Drake Passage from Cape Horn to Antarctica. The 28-foot aluminum rowboat, painted bright red and named Sea Tomato, was designed and built under his supervision. The team covered over 600 miles of rough seas in 14 days, during which the boat overturned several times.

In 1993, Ned and his wife Susan rode camels along a 6,000 mile stretch of the historic Silk Road, from China to the Mediterranean Sea. The couple also illegally crossed the Chinese border to make an unauthorized ascent of Gurla Mandhata in Tibet, went skiing in Iran, and in May 1992 they climbed Mount Everest together.

Ned Gillette was posthumously elected to the National Ski Hall of Fame in 2000.

== Personal life ==
Ned Gillette married US Olympic skier Susan Patterson on August 18, 1990, in a ceremony at the Roundhouse on Bald Mountain, Idaho. The couple lived together in Sun Valley, Idaho.

== Death ==
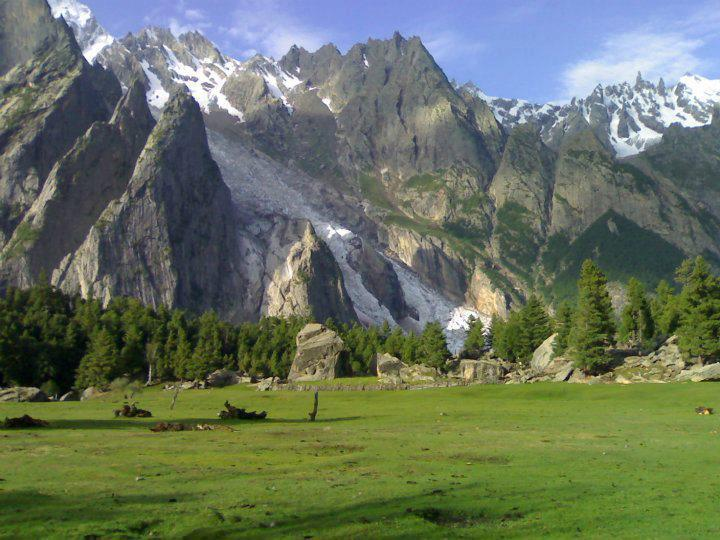
View of Haramosh Valley

On August 5, 1998, Ned and his wife Susan were attacked by gunmen in Haramosh Valley in the Gilgit-Baltistan region of Pakistan-administered Kashmir, where they were attempting to finish a circumnavigation of the Nanga Parbat massif. They had left for Pakistan in early July and expected to return home later in August. The attackers fired upon their tent while they were sleeping, killing Ned and injuring Susan who survived the attack. Two suspects, Abid Hussain and Naun Heshel, were arrested on August 8 and charged with murder and assault for what was believed to have been a robbery attempt, and a shotgun believed to have been used in the attack was recovered by police with the help of local villagers. Ned Gillette was cremated in Pakistan and his ashes were returned to Sun Valley, Idaho by his wife on August 17.

== Notable works ==
- Cross-Country Skiing (1979)
