= Michael Banks =

Michael or Mike Banks may refer to:

- Michael A. Banks (1951–2023), American science fiction writer and editor
- Mike Banks (law enforcement officer), American law enforcement officer
- Mike Banks (musician), American techno producer
- Mike Banks (mountaineer) (1922–2013), British climber and mountaineer
- Mike Banks (American football) (born 1979), former American football tight end
- Michael Banks, one of the characters from Mary Poppins (book series) and adaptations
