= Taisot =

Tesot valley وادی تیسوٹ
- Country: Pakistan
- Province: Gilgit-Baltistan
- District: Gilgit
- Tehsil: Danyore

Taisot is a small valley, with Bilchar village as its principle locality, in the vicinity of six thousander Bilchar Peak (6,143 m) in Gilgit District, north-east of Gilgit city, in the Gilgit-Baltistan region of Pakistan.

== Alternate names ==
The name of the valley is also written as Tesot or Teysot.

== See also ==
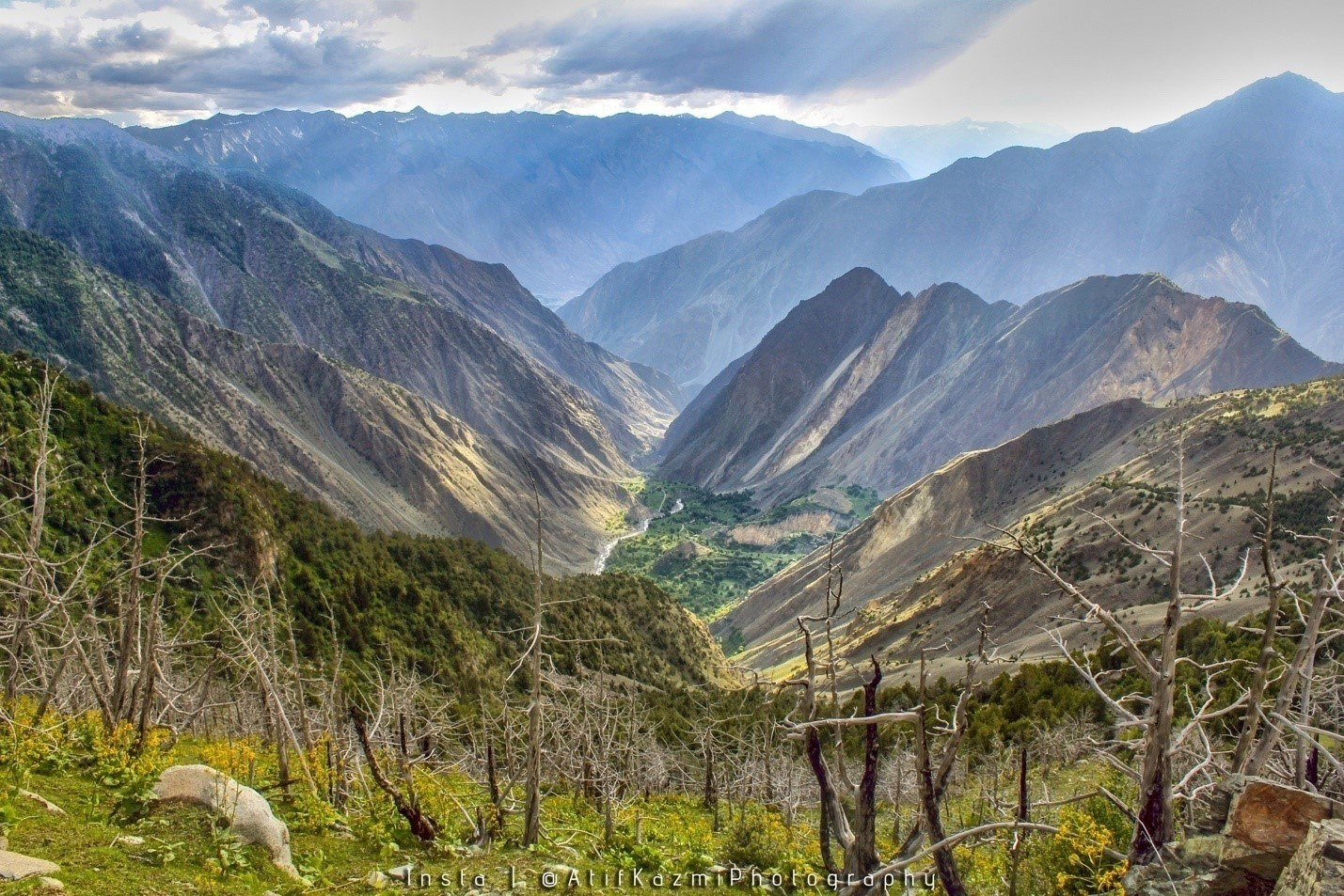
- Lower Bagrot, Gilgit
  Gilgit
- Jalalabad
- Danyor
- Bagrot Valley
