= Chinese Cemetery (Danyor) =

Resting place for deceased Chinese workers in Pakistan

Gilgit Chinese Memorial Cemetery
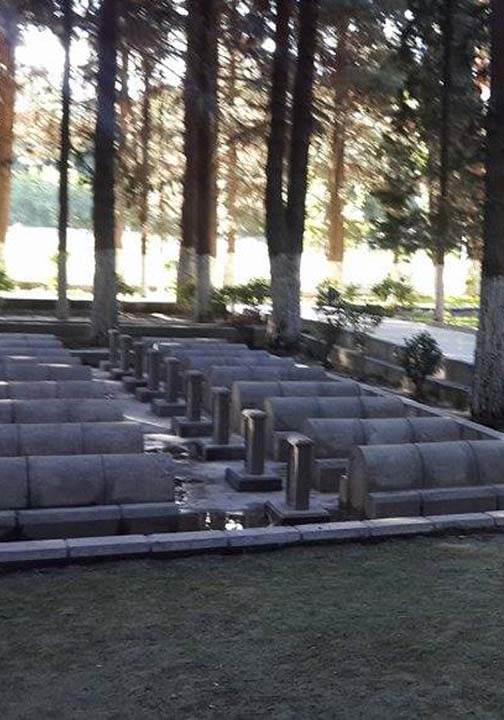
- Tombstones of Chinese workers who died during the construction of the Karakoram Highway in Gilgit–Baltistan
- Interactive map of Gilgit Chinese Memorial Cemetery

Details
- Established: 1970
- Location: Danyor, Gilgit–Baltistan
- Country: Pakistan
- Coordinates: 35.91°N 74.39°E
- Size: 1,600 m^{2} (17,000 sq ft)
- No. of graves: 88
- No. of interments: 140

The Gilgit Chinese Memorial Cemetery (Urdu: چینی یادگاری قبرستان–گلگت; Chinese: 吉尔吉特中国烈士陵园), locally known as the China Memorial (Shina: چین یادگار, lit. 'Chīn Yadgār'), is a graveyard located in Danyor, Gilgit–Baltistan, Pakistan, about 10 kilometres (6.2 mi) from the capital city of Gilgit across the Gilgit River. The cemetery, established in early 1970, serves as the final resting place of Chinese workers and engineers who died during the construction of the Karakoram Highway (KKH) in Pakistan in the 1960s and 1970s. The tombstones placed over the graves contain epitaph inscriptions in Chinese characters.

In August 2011, a Chinese delegation consisting of retired People's Liberation Army soldiers, journalists and a relative of a worker visited the cemetery to pay homage to the deceased. The visit was widely publicized in the Chinese media. Prior to their departure for Pakistan, they had also met the Pakistani ambassador to China, Masood Khan, who appreciated their gesture. In April 2013, a ceremony was held at the cemetery in which Chinese and Pakistani officials were present, including the consul of the Chinese embassy in Islamabad, Zhang Lianyou, officials of the China Road and Bridge Corporation, members of the Gilgit–Baltistan Legislative Assembly and Pakistani law enforcement personnel. During the ceremony, tributes were paid to the deceased and a pledge was laid on behalf of the Chinese government for a renovation of the cemetery. Pakistani officials present at the occasion lauded the contributions of the Chinese workers as a symbol of healthy and longstanding bilateral relations between China and Pakistan.

== Background and significance ==
The Karakoram Highway is an international highway which runs across the Karakoram mountain range and through the Khunjerab Pass, thereby connecting China's Xinjiang region with the neighbouring Pakistani administrative territory of Gilgit–Baltistan in the Kashmir region. It serves as the primary land transport link between Pakistan and China. Construction of the highway was carried out jointly between the governments of Pakistan and China from 1966 to 1979. The construction of the highway had created difficult conditions for Chinese and Pakistani workers due to the high elevation of the mountain range and turbulent weather. Estimates for the highway construction's death toll ranges from around 1000–5000 people, of which nearly a third were Chinese workers who had died mostly in landslides, avalanches and accidental falls. Newer reports estimate the casualties to be higher than initially reported, and difficult to pinpoint due to the nature of the terrain in the region.

The cemetery remains an important visiting attraction in Gilgit.

== See also ==
- Old British Cemetery (Gilgit)
- China–Pakistan relations
  - Chinese people in Pakistan
  - Pakistanis in China
