= Danyor Suspension Bridge =

Bridge in Pakistan

Danyor Suspension Bridge پل صراط
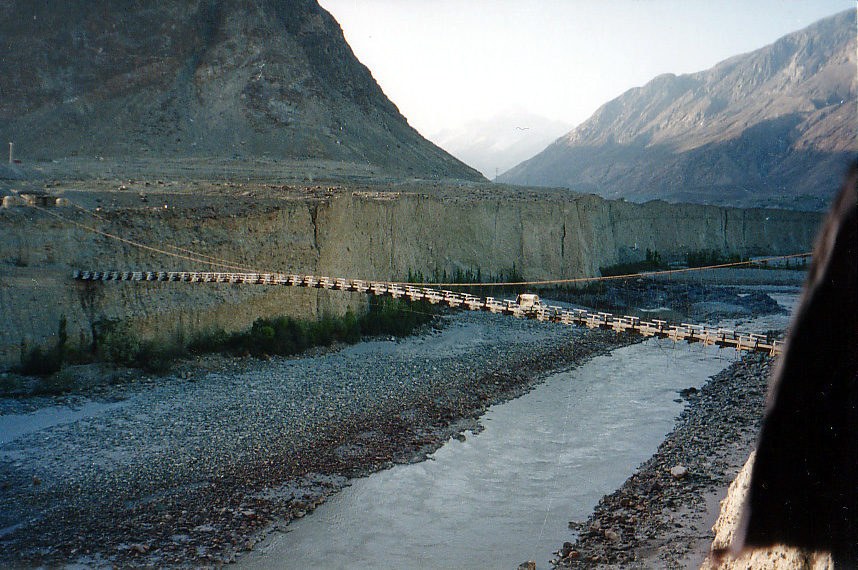
- Coordinates: 35°55′30″N 74°22′20.8″E
- Crosses: Hunza River
- Locale: Danyor, Gilgit District, Gilgit-Baltistan
- Official name: Bireno Suspension Bridge
- Other name: Pul-e-Sirat
- Named for: Ahmad Ali Bireno
- Preceded by: Traditional raft
- Followed by: New concrete bridge

Characteristics
- Design: Medium
- Material: Wooden span
- Trough construction: Metallic ropes
- Total length: 155.4 m
- Width: 2.4 m
- Towpaths: No
- No. of spans: 1
- No. of lanes: 1

History
- Engineering design by: Traditional method
- Rebuilt: No
- Closed: Yes

Statistics
- Daily traffic: Allowed for pedestrians
- Toll: No

Location
- Interactive map of Danyor Suspension Bridge

The Danyore Suspension Bridge, also Danyor Bridge, located in the Gilgit-Baltistan region of Pakistan, is one of the oldest makeshift suspension bridges in the area. Spanning the Hunza River, it connects Danyor to the Karakoram International University. Currently, the bridge is closed to vehicular traffic, allowing passage only for pedestrians and motorcyclists. Strong northwesterly winds cause the bridge to sway, generating minor resonances that render it unsafe for regular use. In 2013, a two-lane concrete bridge was built alongside it, serving as a safer and more reliable alternative for vehicular traffic.

== History ==
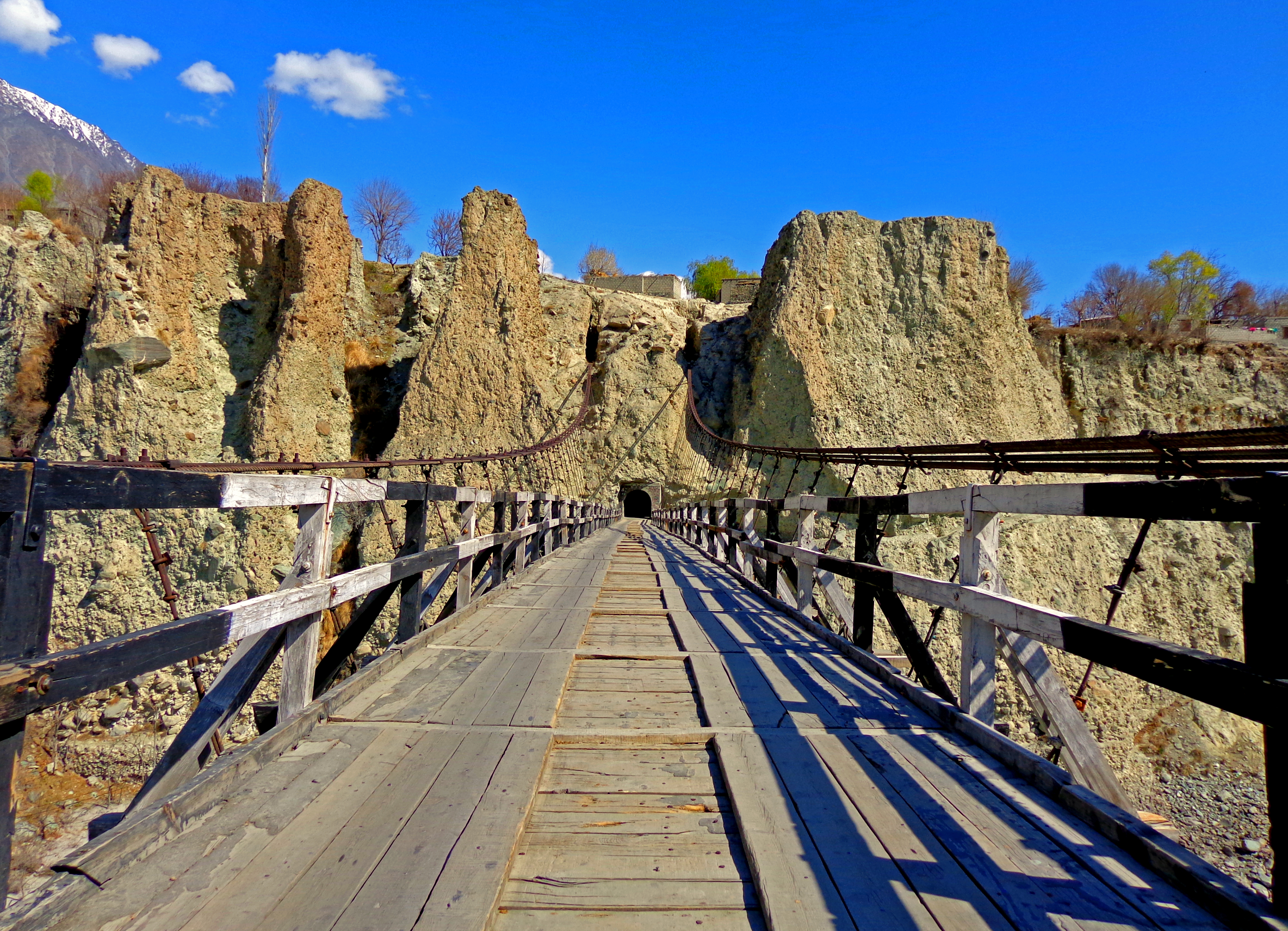
A view of the bridge

Before the construction of the suspension bridge of Danyor there used to be a boat which is locally called Jaalo (a traditional raft for the passage crossing rivers and lakes) used to cross the Hunza River. The bridge was constructed in mid-sixties. The Danyor side of the bridge is connected to a tunnel (locally called core) that was dug by the then-residents of Danyor without any engineering tools and equipments almost a decade later.

== See also ==
- Damaged Chinese Bridge Danyore
