= Oshikhandass =

Oshikhandas اوشیکھنداس
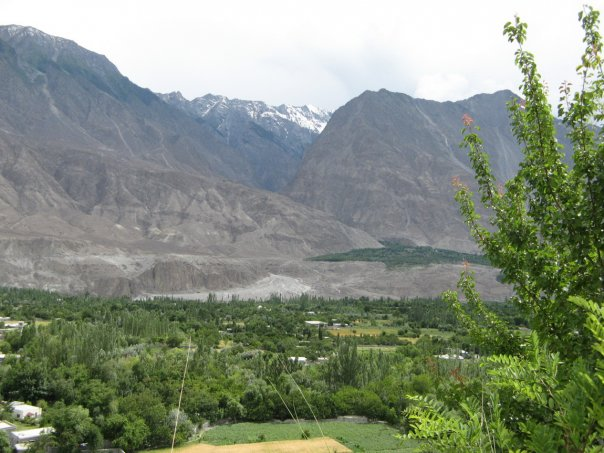
- Country: Pakistan
- Autonomous region: Gilgit-Baltistan
- District: Gilgit
- Tehsil: Danyore

Population (2011 estimate)
  - Total: 7,200

Oshikhandass is a village in the Gilgit-Baltistan region of northern Pakistan. It lies east of the city of Gilgit. Oshikhandass is part of the Bagrot Valley and had approximately 7,200 inhabitants in 2011. The local economy is primarily agriculture based. There are three government schools, two of which are for girls and one for boys. The village also has five private schools. Oshikhandass lies at an altitude of 1,500 metres (4,900 ft).

This village links Bagrot Valley and Jalalabad to Danyor, a city in Gilgit. The Karakorum Highway runs through the town. Shina and Burushaski are the main languages. Nanga Parbat, the world's 9th highest mountain, lies to the east of the village, and can be seen from Oshikhandass.

== History ==
The historic name of Oshikhandass was "Punal Dass". The name of this village Oshikhandass evolved from two languages. "Oshi" means wind in Shina language, "Khan" means 'town' in the Burushaski language and "Dass" means 'uncultivated land' in both languages. This land was under custody of the valley. It was cultivated by the people who came from Bagrot Valley and Hunza in July 1937 led by Numbardar Khuda Amman. These people were sent by the Mir of Hunza, as he made a verbal agreement with the people of Bagrot Valley. Those people (who came from Hunza on the 54 of the people of Oshikhandass) constructed the water channel which supplies water to the village even today. The two main people who led the project were both named Hubi Ali (often called elder Hubi and young Hubi), both remained in Oshikhandass after completion of the channel along most of the workers who came along them from Hunza. The water channel is linked to the river which comes from Glaciers of Karakoram through Bagrot valley. Most of the water of Oshikhandass comes from the Bagrot Glacier.

Oshikhandass Welfare and Development organization (OWDO) is a registered welfare organization in the village. This organization was founded in 2005 by Manzoor Hussain, a social worker. Many people from Oshikhandass work in Gilgit, as shopkeepers and in other small enterprises.

== Economy ==
Agriculture is the backbone of the local economy: wheat, potatoes, apples, apricots and other fruits are grown. The glacier-fed water-system allows cultivation in an otherwise mountainous terrain. Many residents also engage in livestock (goats, sheep, cattle) and small‐scale trade. Because of the proximity to Gilgit, some commute or conduct business in the city. A growing number also work in Freelance, tourism (guiding, lodging) given the scenic value.

== Demographics ==
The population consists mainly of speakers of Burushaski and Shina, reflecting the cultural intersection between Hunza and Gilgit regions. Islam is the predominant religion, with the majority belonging to the Shia Ismaili Muslim and Shia Ashariyya community.

== Education ==
Oshikhandass hosts several primary and secondary schools, both public and community-based, supported by NGO's. Over recent decades, the literacy rate has improved significantly, with many students pursuing higher education in Gilgit and other cities of Pakistan.

== Places nearby ==
- Jalalabad
- Danyor

== See also ==
- Gilgit
