= Susan Patterson =

American alpine skier (born 1955)

Susan Patterson (born October 11, 1955, in Sun Valley, Idaho) is an American former World Cup alpine ski racer who competed in the 1976 Winter Olympics. She was fourteenth in the downhill, younger brother Pete (b.1957) was also on the U.S. Olympic team and was thirteenth in the men's downhill.

Two years earlier at the U.S. Alpine Championships, she won the slalom event at Pats Peak in Henniker, New Hampshire.

In 1990, Patterson married explorer Ned Gillette in a ceremony at the Roundhouse on Sun Valley's Bald Mountain. Eight years later, while they were trekking in the mountains of northern Pakistan, Gillette was shot and killed at their encampment; Patterson was hospitalized and recovered.
