= Mike Banks (mountaineer) =

Soldier, author, and adventurer (1922–2013)

Michael Edward Borg Banks
- Born: 22 December 1922; Chippenham
- Died: 9 February 2013 (aged 90)
- Occupation: Soldier Adventurer Climber Author

Michael Edward Borg Banks MBE (22 December 1922 – 9 February 2013) was a British soldier, adventurer, climber and author.

== Early life ==
Banks was born in Chippenham, Wiltshire, England, on 22 December 1922. His father Humphrey Borg, an engineer, and mother Elsie (nee Millicent) worked in Malta, where Banks was schooled until returning to Chippenham when he was 14. He adopted the surname Banks by deed poll, in adulthood. Banks was a vegetarian.

== Career and later life ==
Banks joined the Royal Marines, with a commission, in January 1942. He was a member of the British North Greenland Expedition (1952 to 1954).

He appeared as a castaway on the BBC Radio programme Desert Island Discs on 25 November 1954. He was appointed a Member of the Order of the British Empire in 1959.

In 1958, he made the first ascent of Rakaposhi with Tom Patey as part of a British-Pakistani joint forces Himalayan expedition.

At the age of 77, in May 2000, he climbed the Scottish sea stack, the Old Man of Hoy becoming the oldest person to have done so.

He died in Bristol on 9 February 2013, aged 90.

== Bibliography ==
- —— (1955). Commando climber. Dent.
- —— (1957). High Arctic: The story of the British North Greenland Expedition. Dent.
- —— (1957). High Arctic. Secker & Warburg.
- —— (1959). Rakaposhi. Secker & Warburg.
- —— (1961). Snow Commando. Burke.
- —— (1975). Greenland. David & Charles. ISBN 978-0715369111.
- —— (1979). Mountaineering for Beginners. Hodder & Stoughton. ISBN 978-0340236956.
