= Kutiah Lungma Glacier =

Glacier in Pakistan

Kutia Lungma Glacier
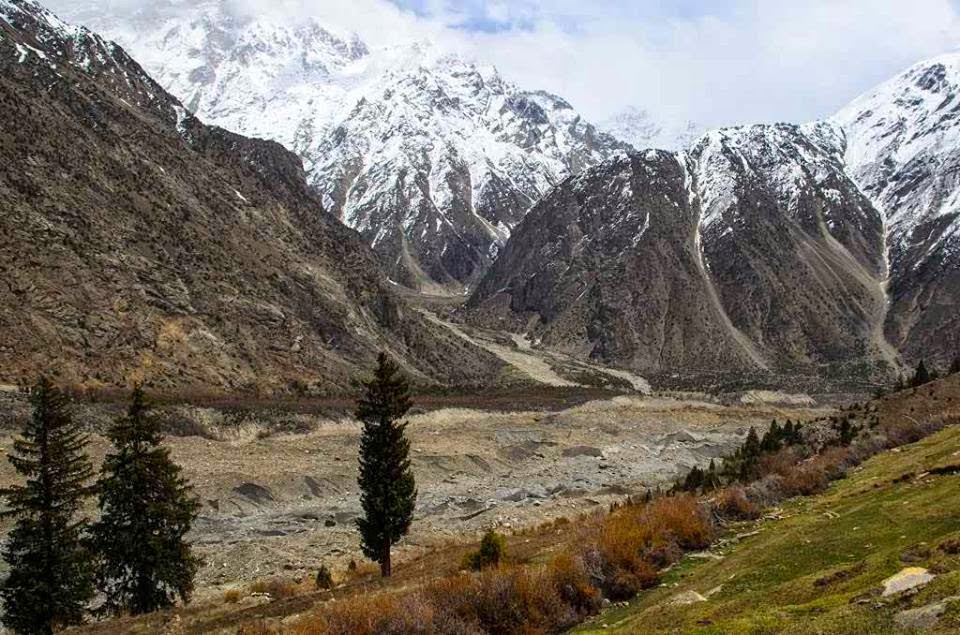
- Kutia Lungma Glacier, looking NW to SE

- Location within Karakoram Location within Gilgit Baltistan
- Interactive map of Kutia Lungma Glacier
- Type: Mountain glacier
- Location: Karakoram range, Baltistan, Pakistan
- Coordinates: 35°46′57″N 75°02′14″E
- Length: 12 kilometres (7.5 mi)

Kutiah Lungma Glacier is a glacier that stretches for approximately 12 km in length and has a width of about 3 km. It is situated within the Karakoram mountain range in the Stak Valley of District Skardu, Gilgit-Baltistan, Pakistan. This glacier is located in the Stak Valley, which is sometimes referred to as Staq, and it falls within the subdivision of Roundu in district Skardu, Gilgit-Baltistan.

Kutiah Lungma Glacier lies to the north of Nanga Parbat, the ninth highest peak in the world, at a distance of roughly 20 kilometers from the northern bank of the Indus River. The glacier can be accessed from June to September starting from either Skardu or Gilgit city, as it is approximately 10 km away from the Gilgit-Skardu road. There is an un-metalled road leading from the junction of the Indus River and Stak Valley stream on the Gilgit-Skardu Road that leads to the base camp of the glacier.

== History ==
Kutiah Lungma Glacier has a long history, and it is accompanied by a story, which some consider fictional, while others believe it to be true. The narrative goes as follows:

The Stak Valley in the past was the headquarter of the Subdivision Roundu, as at the time there was no road network and the valley was fertile and the biggest valley in the subdivision. There was a king named "Rong Lonchay, who had six daughters. The youngest of these daughters was named Apino.

As the king neared the end of his life, he decided to distribute his wealth and assets among his daughters. As Apino was the youngest and the most loved one, therefore he had given away the biggest and the fertile valley of Stak to the Apino. She lived in the Stak Valley and in the last ages she had lost her eyesight. Once a local resident misconducted her by presenting her with a dunk cake pretending to be a cookie. She looked offended and cursed on the residents, praying the God to vanish the valley and send his calamity and adversity on them. She left the valley and the glacier started expanding downward towards the inhabited areas. It is said that the area which is now covered by the glacier was once a fertile area and fully covered by human settlements. Now the whole area is covered by the glacier and there is nothing except huge reserve of ice and rocks.

== Climatic effect on surging and retreat ==
The glacier had advanced about 12.8 kilometers in 1955 towards the populated area within 91 days. The glacier was advancing at a staggering rate of just over a mile every month, 15 feet every hour and had devoured acres of pastureland. The local elders still tell the story of the glacier's advancing towards the pastureland. According to the elders, the glacier advanced at a very noticeable rate i.e. the glacier would first grow vertically and then suddenly fall flat. Within months the glacier had reached at the first hamlet and people were very concerned that the whole Stak Valley would be devoured by the glacier if it did not retreat. People also relate it with an indigenous logic that the glaciers also have gender and the Kutia Lungma Glacier was female and it was advancing to meet its male counterpart i.e. the glacier in the opposite Ganji Valley across the Indus River. People believe that it was real. The elders tell that they brought pieces of ice from the other glacier which they thought to be male and dropped the ice pieces on the Kutia Liungma Glacier. Along with people arranged rituals and prayed the god to save them from the glacier advancing. Within two to three years the glacier retreated about 4-5 kilometers. Now the glacier is about 4-5 kilometers uphill from the last village of Stak Valley, which is known as Tookla Village.

== See also ==
- Baltoro Glacier
- Haramosh Peak
- Godwin-Austen Glacier
- Sarpo Laggo Glacier
- Eight-thousander
- List of highest mountains
- List of glaciers
- Laila Peak
