= Chogo Lungma Glacier =

Glacier in Pakistan

Chogo Lungma
- Location within Karakoram Location within Gilgit Baltistan
- Interactive map of Chogo Lungma
- Type: Mountain glacier
- Location: Karakoram range, Gilgit-Baltistan, Pakistan
- Coordinates: 35°52′27″N 75°13′03″E

Chogo Lungma Glacier is a glacier in the Karakorum mountain ranges in Shigar District of Gilgit-Baltistan, Pakistan. It was the first of all the big Karakorum glaciers to be discovered, in 1835.

== See also ==
- Baltoro Glacier
- Biafo Glacier
- Godwin-Austen Glacier
- Kutiah Lungma Glacier
