= Jalalabad, Gilgit =

Coordinates: 35.8800°N 74.4930°E

Jalalabad جلال آباد
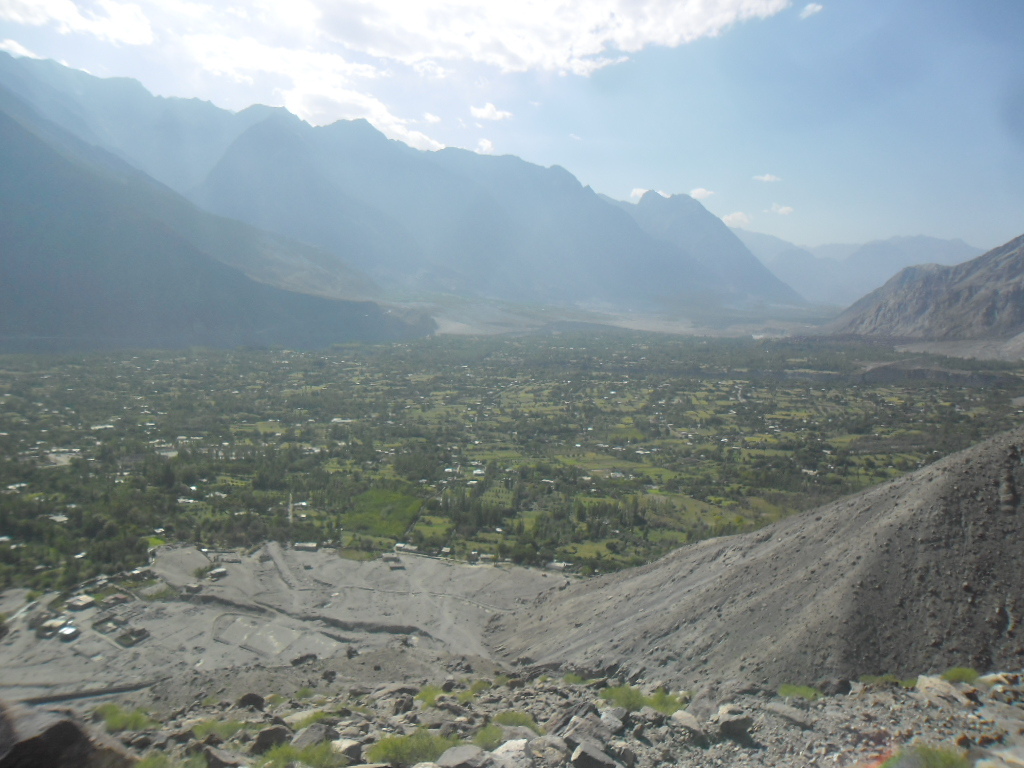
- Tehsil: Danyor

Population (2018 estimate)
  - Total: 40,000

Jalalabad (Urdu: جلال آباد) is a village in the Gilgit-Baltistan region of northern Pakistan. The settlement is located around 20 km east of Gilgit city. The village has a population of around 40,000 in some 5,000 households. All of the inhabitants are Shia Muslims. The Bagrote River is the source of irrigation and, through the village's powerhouse, also provides electricity. During the 1940s, people from Bilchar Valley, with the help of the British Indian Government, created water canals and established an irrigation system. It is predominantly agricultural land. There are two separate government high schools for boys and girls, Al-Mustafa Public School for both boys and girls. There are a large number of primary and middle schools. The literacy rate is approximately 96%. The village was the major victim of sectarian violence in 1988, when extra-regional forces consisting of thousands of armed militiamen under the command of General Zia Ul Haq and the Government ruined this village, burned houses, killing many innocent people. After this incident, the village was reconstructed. Now it is the center of Shias in Gilgit. The head of Shias of Gilgit-Baltistan and Khateeb of Gilgit Imamia Masjid Agha Rahat Hussain Al-Hussaini also hails from this village.

== See also ==
- Danyor
- Bagrot Valley
