= Rakaposhi =

Mountain in Pakistan

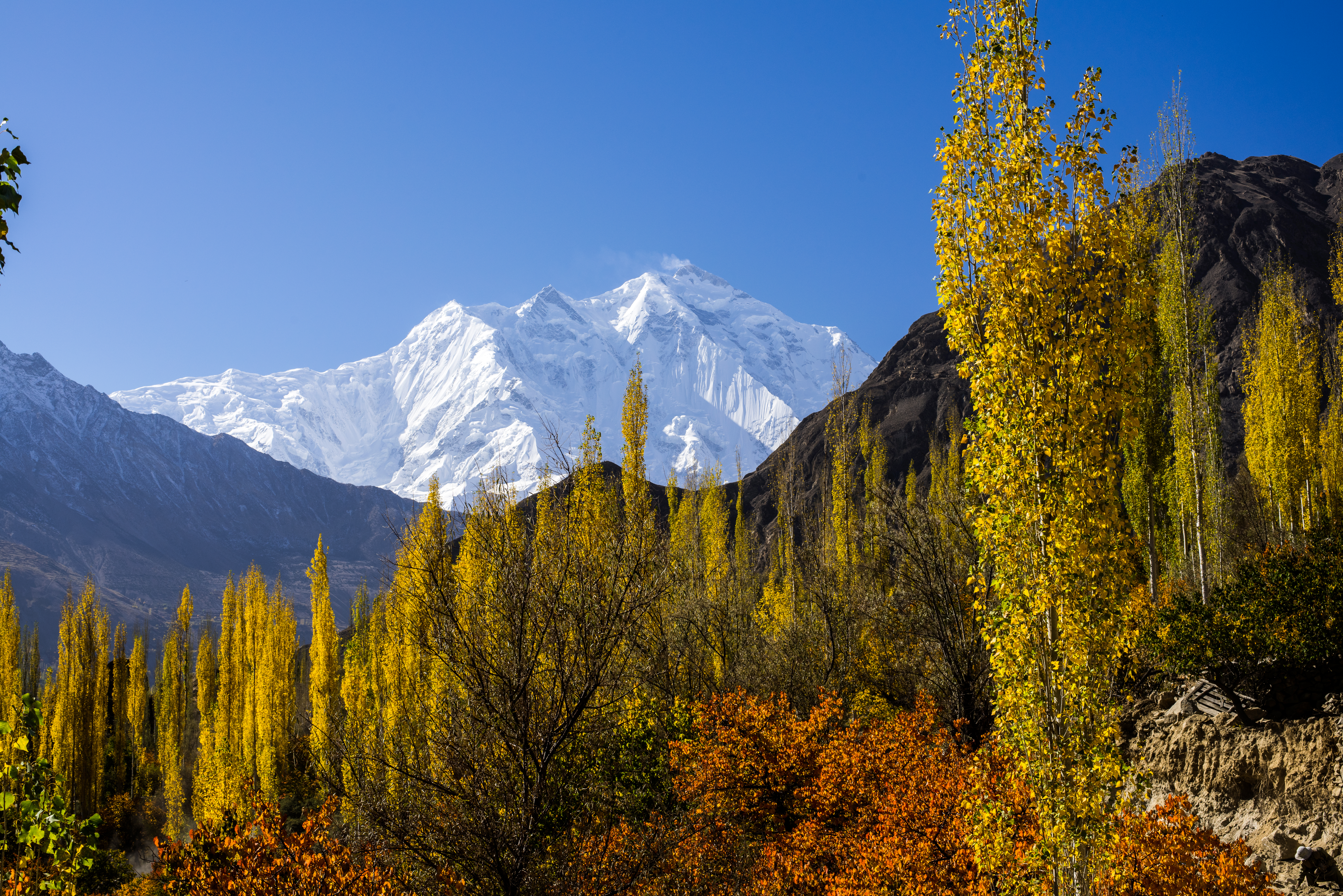
- A view of Rakaposhi before Autumn c. 2017

Highest point
- Elevation: 7,788 m (25,551 ft); Ranked 27th
- Prominence: 2,818 m (9,245 ft); Ranked 122nd
- Listing: Ultra; Mountains of Pakistan
- Coordinates: 36°08′33″N 74°29′21″E

Naming
- Native name: راکاپوشی / رَکی پُوشِہ (Urdu)

Geography
- Location within Pakistan Location within Gilgit Baltistan
- The major peaks in Karakoram are rank identified by height. Legend: 1：K2; 2：Gasherbrum I, K5; 3：Broad Peak; 4：Gasherbrum II, K4; 5：Gasherbrum III, K3a; 6：Gasherbrum IV, K3; 7：Distaghil Sar; 8：Kunyang Chhish; 9：Masherbrum, K1; 10：Batura Sar, Batura I; 11：Rakaposhi; 12：Batura II; 13：Kanjut Sar; 14：Saltoro Kangri, K10; 15：Batura III; 16： Saser Kangri I, K22; 17：Chogolisa; 18：Shispare; 19：Trivor Sar; 20：Skyang Kangri; 21：Mamostong Kangri, K35; 22：Saser Kangri II; 23：Saser Kangri III; 24：Pumari Chhish; 25：Passu Sar; 26：Yukshin Gardan Sar; 27：Teram Kangri I; 28：Malubiting; 29：K12; 30：Sia Kangri; 31：Momhil Sar; 32：Skil Brum; 33：Haramosh Peak; 34：Ghent Kangri; 35：Ultar Sar; 36：Rimo Massif; 37：Sherpi Kangri; 38：Yazghil Dome South; 39：Baltoro Kangri; 40：Crown Peak; 41：Baintha Brakk; 42：Yutmaru Sar; 43：K6; 44：Muztagh Tower; 45：Diran; 46：Apsarasas Kangri I; 47：Rimo III; 48：Gasherbrum V; Location in Nagar valley, Bagrote valley Gilgit-Baltistan
- Location: between Nagar Valley, Bagrot Valley, District Gilgit, Gilgit-Baltistan, Pakistan
- Parent range: Rakaposhi, Karakoram

Climbing
- First ascent: 1958 by Mike Banks and Tom Patey
- Easiest route: Southwest Spur - glacier/snow/ice

Rakaposhi (Burushaski: رآکاپوݜی, lit. 'Shining Wall'; Urdu: راکاپوشی) also known as Dumani (Burushaski: دومآنی, lit. 'Mother of Mist') is a mountain within the Karakoram range in Gilgit-Baltistan in Pakistan. It is situated in the middle of the Nagar and Bagrote valleys. The mountain is extremely broad, measuring almost 20 kilometres (12 mi) from east to west. It is the only peak on earth that descends directly and without interruption for almost 6,000 metres from its summit to its base.

== Geography ==
Rakaposhi is a mountain in the Karakoram mountain range in the Gilgit-Baltistan region of Pakistan, about 100 km (62 mi) north of the city of Gilgit. It is the 27th-highest mountain in the world and ranked 122nd by prominence. Rakaposhi rises over the Nagar Valley.

The first successful recorded ascent was in 1958 by Mike Banks and Tom Patey, members of a British expedition, via the southwest Spur/Ridge route. It was over 20 years before another team succeeded in reaching the summit, in 1979.

== Park ==
Rakaposhi is also known as Dumani ("Mother of Mist" or "Mother of Clouds"). The people of Nagar and Bagrot Valley have dedicated the Rakaposhi range mountain area as a community park. The minister for the northern areas inaugurated the park. The Rakaposhi mountain range is the home of endangered species such as Marco Polo sheep, snow leopard, brown bear, and wolves.

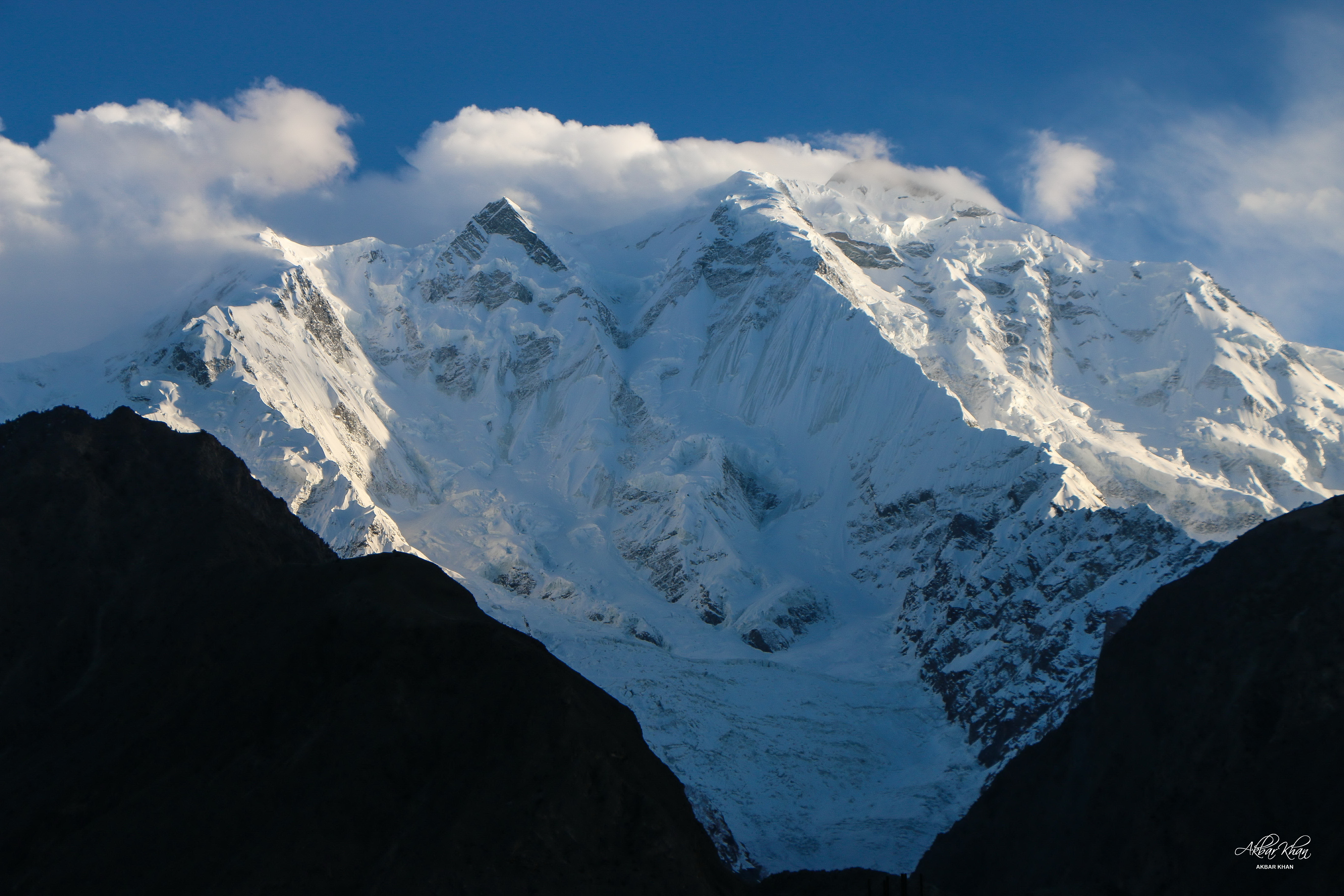
Rakaposhi as viewed from the road across the valley.

== Notable features ==
Rakaposhi is notable for its exceptional rise over local terrain. On the north, it rises 5,900 metres (19,357 ft) in only an 11.2 km (7 mi) horizontal distance from the Hunza River. There are views of Rakaposhi from the Karakoram Highway on the route through Nagar. A tourist spot in the town of Ghulmet (located on the Hunza River) called "Zero Point of Rakaposhi" is the closest view point of the mountain.

=== Taghafari ===
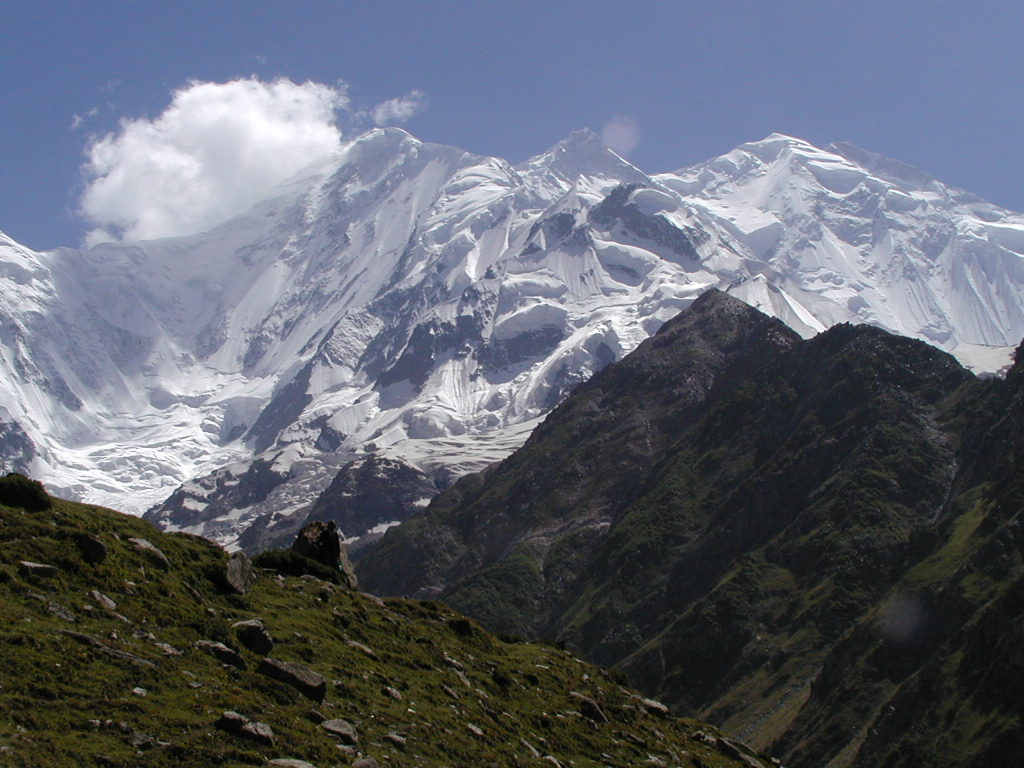
Rakaposhi (7,788m) from Taghafari base camp

Taghafari, Tagafari or Tagaferi is the base camp of Rakaposhi from the Nagar side.

== Time line ==
Front view of Rakaposhi Peak from Bagrote Valley, Gilgit

- 1892 Martin Conway explored the south side of Rakaposhi.
- 1938 M. Vyvyan and R. Campbell Secord made the first reconnaissance and climbed a north-western forepeak (about 5,800 m (19,030 ft)) via the northwest ridge.
- 1947 Secord returned with H. W. Tilman and two Swiss climbers, Hans Gyr and Robert Kappeler; they ascended via the Gunti glacier to 5,800 m (19,000 ft) on the south-west spur.
- 1954 A Cambridge University team, led by Alfred Tissières, attempted the peak via the south-west spur but only reached 6,340 m (20,800 ft). Tissières' party included Major General Mian Hayaud Din, the Chief of General Staff of the Pakistan Army and liaison officer, and George Band who was a member of the team that made the first ascent of Everest in 1953 and was later to be part of the team who made the first ascent of Kangchenjunga. An Austro-German expedition led by Mathias Rebitsch also attempted the same route on the mountain a couple of months earlier in the season but, because of the avalanche risk in the Rakaposhi area at the time, they moved to climb in an area c. 40 km to the NE.
- 1956 A British-American expedition, led by Mike Banks, reached 7,163 m (23,500 ft) on the Southwest Ridge, above the Gunti glacier.
- 1958 The first successful recorded ascent: Mike Banks and Tom Patey, members of a British expedition, via the Southwest Spur/Ridge route. They both suffered minor frostbite during the ascent to the summit on June 25.
- 1964 An Irish expedition, led by Paddy O’Leary with Joss Lynam as deputy, attempted the long and difficult Northwest Ridge.
- 1971 Karl Herrligkoffer led an attempt on the elegant but difficult North Spur (or North Ridge).
- 1973 Herrligkoffer returned to the North Spur but was again unsuccessful due to time and weather problems.
- 1979 A Polish-Pakistan expedition ascended the Northwest Ridge from the Biro Glacier.
- 1979 A Japanese expedition from Waseda University, led by Eiho Ohtani, succeeded in climbing the North Spur. Summit party: Ohtani and Matsushi Yamashita. This ascent was expedition-style, done over a period of six weeks, with 5000 m of fixed rope.
- 1984 A Canadian team achieves a semi-alpine-style ascent of the North Spur, using much less fixed rope than the Japanese team had. Summit party: Barry Blanchard, David Cheesmond, Kevin Doyle.
- 1985-1987 Various unsuccessful attempts on the long East Ridge.
- 1986 A Dutch team climbed a variation of the Northwest Ridge route.
- 1995 An ascent via the Northwest Ridge.
- 1997 An ascent via the Southwest Spur/Ridge (possibly the original route).
- 2000 An attempt from the east side Bagrot Valley Hinercha Glacier.
- 2002 A Canadian caliber attempt period of 2 weeks from front side of base camp Hinercha glacier Bagrote valley gilgit east side.
- 2004 An attempt from the east side Bagrot Valley Hinercha Glacier.
- 2019 An ascent by two Japanese mountainers, Kazuya Hiraide and Kenro Nakajima.
- 2021 A successful ascent by Wajidullah Nagari and two Czech climbers, Jacob Vicek and Peter Macek.

== Climbing routes ==
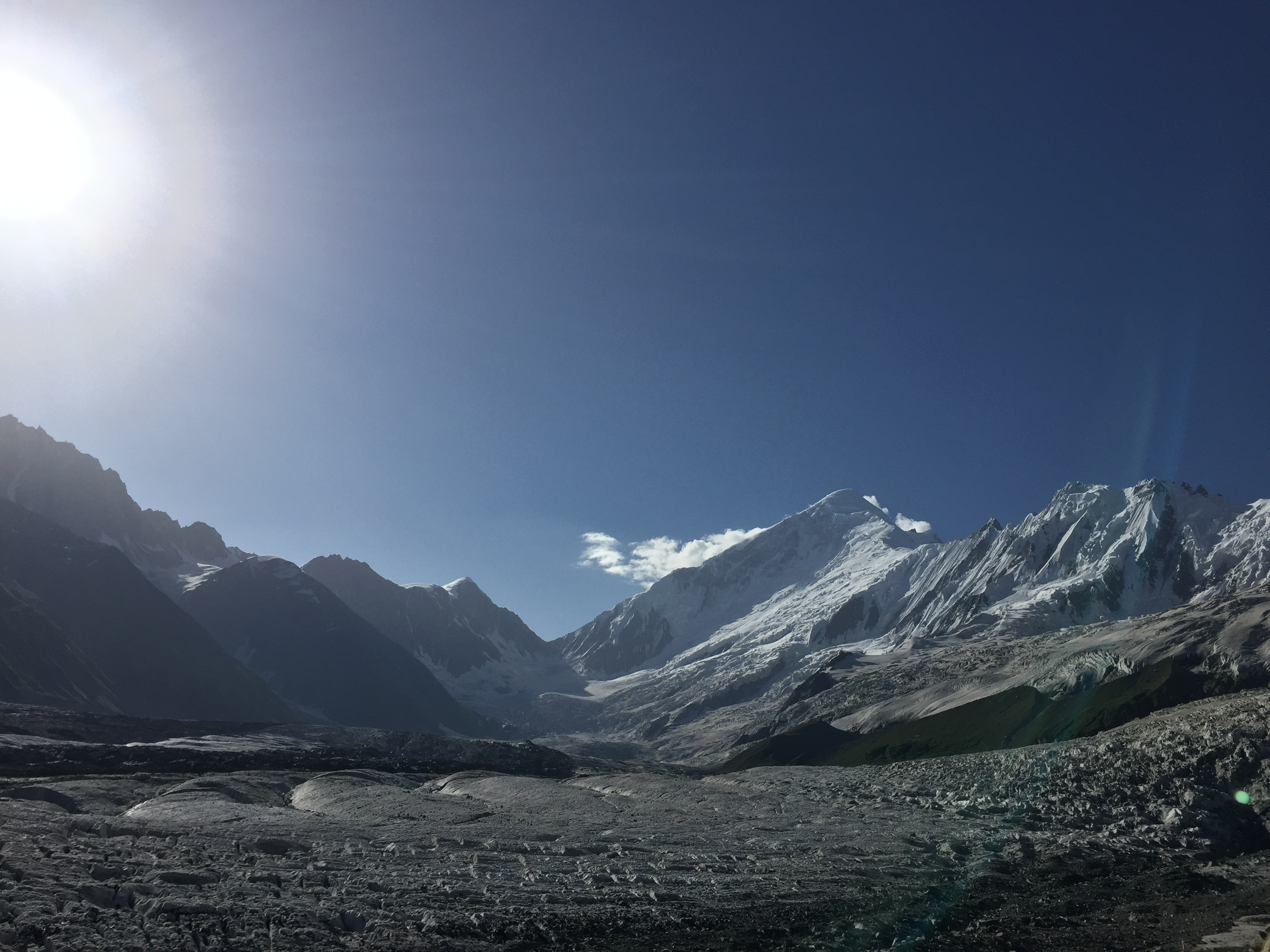
A view of Diran from Tagaferi Base Camp after sunrise.

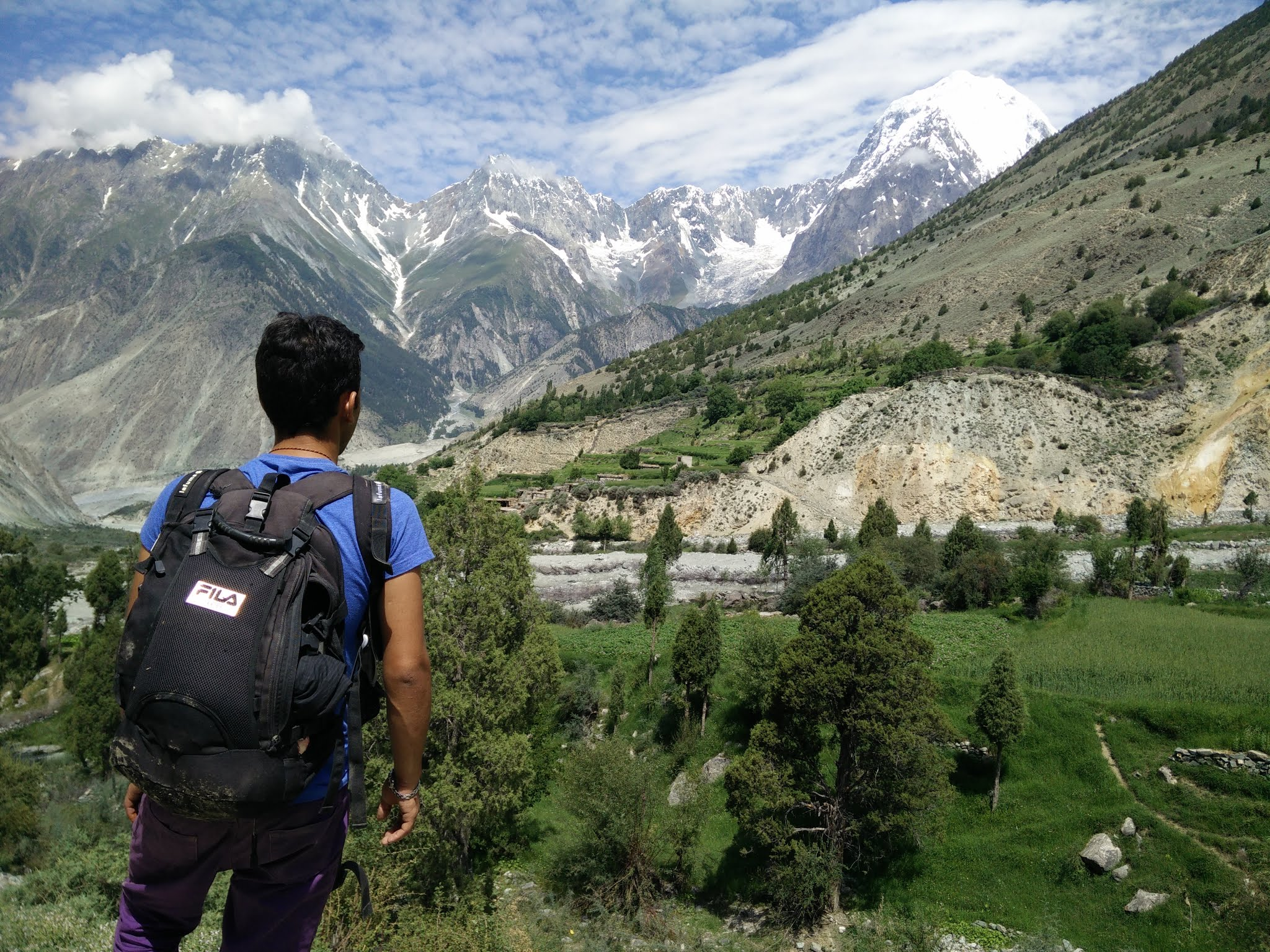
A view of Rakaposhi from Bagrot Valley

The routes with successful summits so far have been (see the timeline as well):

- Southwest Spur/Ridge (first ascent route). Long, but not exceedingly technical. Some tricky gendarmes (rock pinnacles). Has been repeated.
- From the east side, it is short route to climb
- Northwest Ridge. Long, and more technically difficult than the Southwest Spur/Ridge. Has been repeated.
- North Spur (a.k.a. North Ridge). Shorter than the above two routes, but much more technically difficult. Has been repeated, including a semi-alpine style (capsule-style) ascent.

Attempts have also been made from the east side Bagrot Valley Hinearcha Glacier, the East Ridge, and the North Face.

== See also ==
- Highest mountains of the world
- List of ultras of the Karakoram and Hindu Kush

== Sources ==
- Neate, Jill (1989). High Asia: An Illustrated History of the 7000 Metre Peaks. Seattle: The Mountaineers. ISBN 0-89886-238-8.
- Fanshawe, Andy; Venables, Stephen (1995). Himalaya Alpine-Style. Hodder and Stoughton. ISBN 0-89886-456-9.
- DEM files for the Himalaya/Karakoram (Corrected versions of SRTM data)
