= Bagrot Valley =

Bagrot Valley وادی بگروٹ
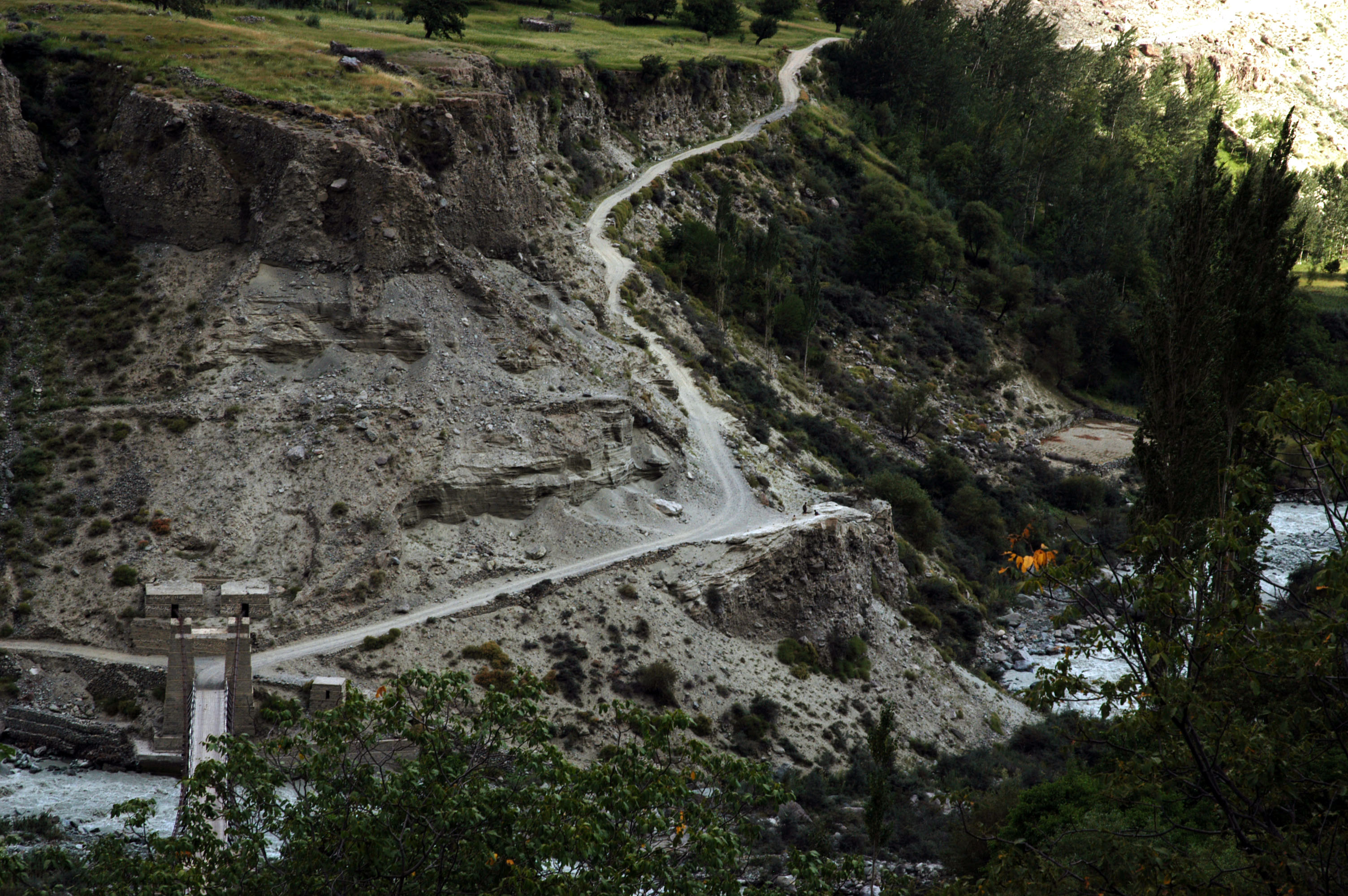
- Country: Pakistan
- Autonomous state: Gilgit-Baltistan
- District: Gilgit
- Tehsil: Danyor

Population
  - Total: 10,000
- Demonym: Bagoreh
- Time zone: UTC+5:30 (PST)
  - Summer (DST): +5
- Postal code: 15110

Bagrot Valley (Urdu: وادی بگروٹ) is a valley in the Karakoram range in the Gilgit-Baltistan region of northern Pakistan. River Bagrot flows through the valley from the north to the southwest, supplying water to the settlements of Jalalabad and Oshikhandass before merging with the Gilgit River.

== Geography ==
Bagrot valley extends between 2,500 and 4,500 metres above sea level. The principal locality of the valley is Farfu (formerly called Furpui), also known for its landscape and high mountains such as Rakaposhi (7,788 m), Diran (7,266 m), Bilchar Dobani (6,138 m), Miar Peak (6,824 m), Godeli and many other peaks that surpass 6,000 metres above sea level. Doboi glaciers, Gargo, Yunay, Boi Pharai, Hurangi, and Raka Poshi surround the valley from where the rivulets forming the Bagrot River are traced. The River Bagrot passes by all the villages of the valley, including Jalalabad and Oshikhandass and merges with the Gilgit River.

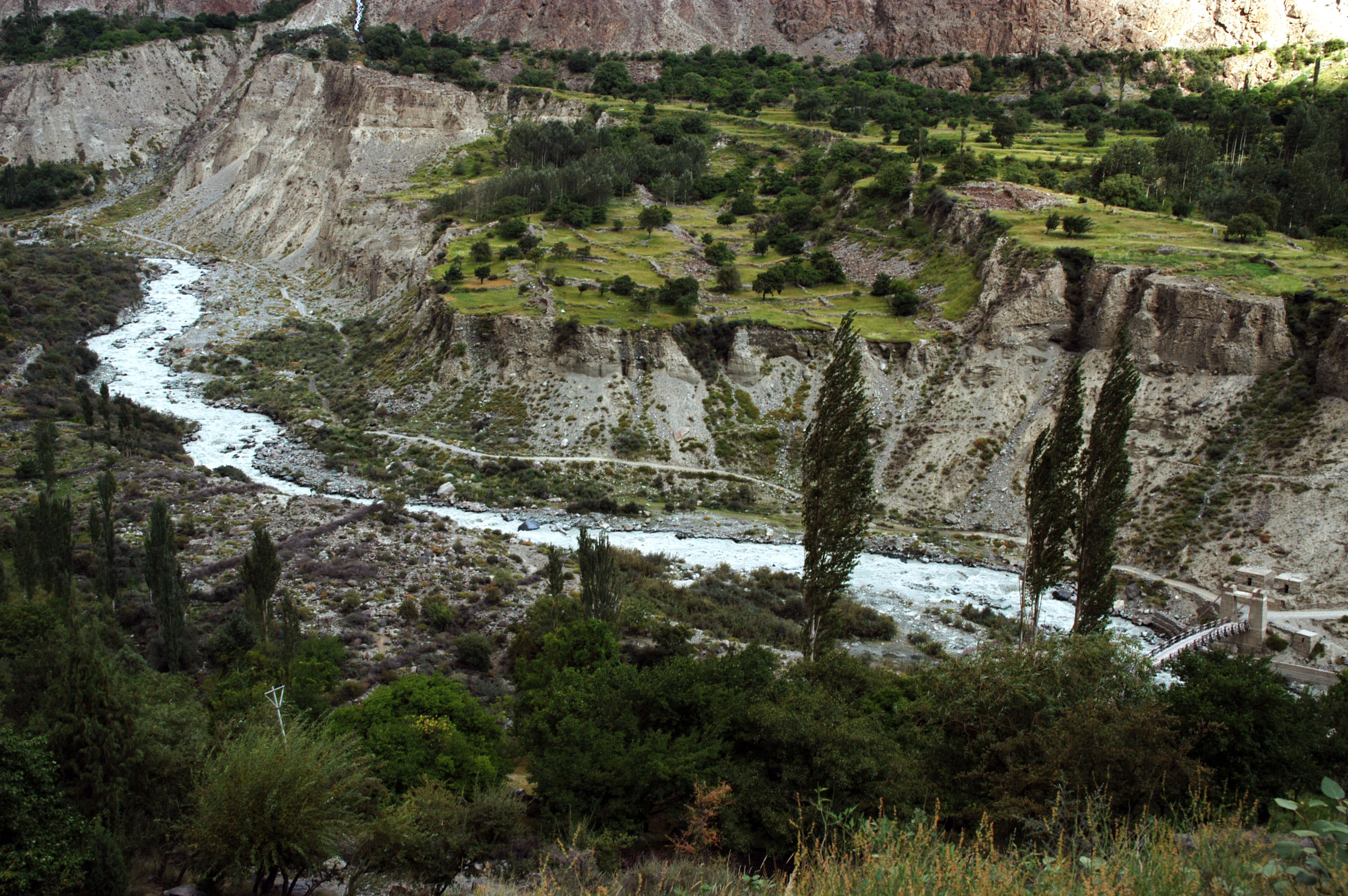
River Bagrote near Hopay village

Bagrot Valley is 38 km from Gilgit and traveling time is two hours plus till Gasunar valley. Geographically it has Rakaposhi ( Raki poshi) and its glacier from where people from Gilgit fetch ice for commercial purposes. This valley was rather inaccessible even for the local population due to the road condition. Now, 2/3rd of the road is metalled and the rest is in a condition that even a small car can travel on it. The valley is blessed with numerous springs, gushing rivers, lofty peaks, glaciers, and the best part is organic fruits and vegetables. The last village is known as Sath Gasunar (also known as Gasunar valley, must-visit point). It has a jumping point for trekkers to traverse Haramosh Valley. From Gasunar valley Rakaposhi is visible.

== History ==
Bagrot Valley has long been a cradle of ancient traditions and culture. Rich in history, the valley continues to preserve its cultural heritage and festivals to this day. According to local accounts, the first settler of the valley was Cholok (or Chalok) according to the Peter Snoy. Following him, Tais, Raki, Dodo, and Shoro became the ancestors of many of the present-day inhabitants. Some extinct families of the valley, as mentioned by locals, include Hau Bajiting, Milay Dosay, and Milik Maluway.

== Geology ==
The Bagrote valley in Gilgit Baltistan, Pakistan, belonging to the Kohistan island arc and southwestern domain of the Karakorum metamorphic complex, respectively, is a location of regional placer gold mining.

The geology of Bagrote valley is mainly composed of the rocks of the Chalt Group. In the study area, the chalt metavolcanic of this group are mainly covering the study area along the eastern and western part of the Bagrote river. However, a small exposure of ultramafic rocks is also exposed in the south-eastern portion of the study area. The terraces of glacial fluvial and fluvial sediments generally cover the Chalt volcanic in the area. The Chalt group consists of a very heterogeneous sequence and is commonly exposed in the surroundings of the upper Gilgit and lower Hunza area. It consists of alternating meta-sediments and volcanic. The association of meta-sediments with tuffs and basaltic to andesitic lavas is well observed in the Bagrote valley. A large number of diorites and granites, which belong to the younger igneous phase, are intruded into the Chalt group. In the upper reaches of the Bulchi and Chirah villages, the Chalt group consists of thinly bedded slates and yellowish pyrite-bearing schists chlorite-epidote hornblende schist with intercalation of this beds of grey to yellowish carbonates and marbles. Towards the north, there is a succession of phyllites, quartzite-phyllites, and sericite schist, which show a continuous transition from basaltic lavas tuff to the chlorite and sericites schist. In Bagrote valley north of Datuche village and near the Gutumi glacier a formation of metamorphic rocks strikes approximately E-W and dips towards the south. It consists of phyllites, sericite-chlorite schists with quartz stringers, and lenses carrying sulfides. These rocks also attained higher metamorphic grades, such as garnet-staurolite schists and gneisses in certain places of Bagrote valley.

== Demography ==
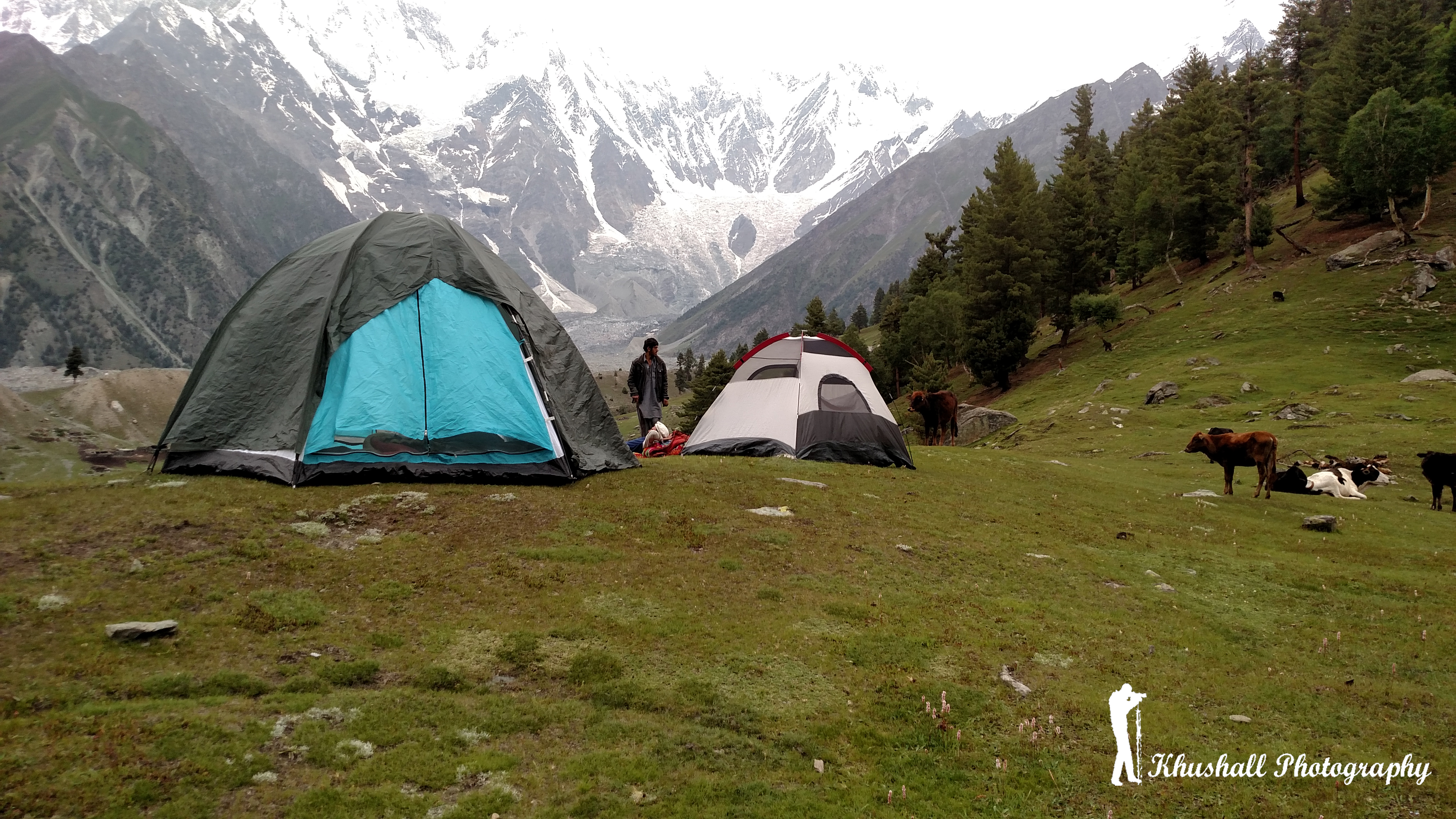

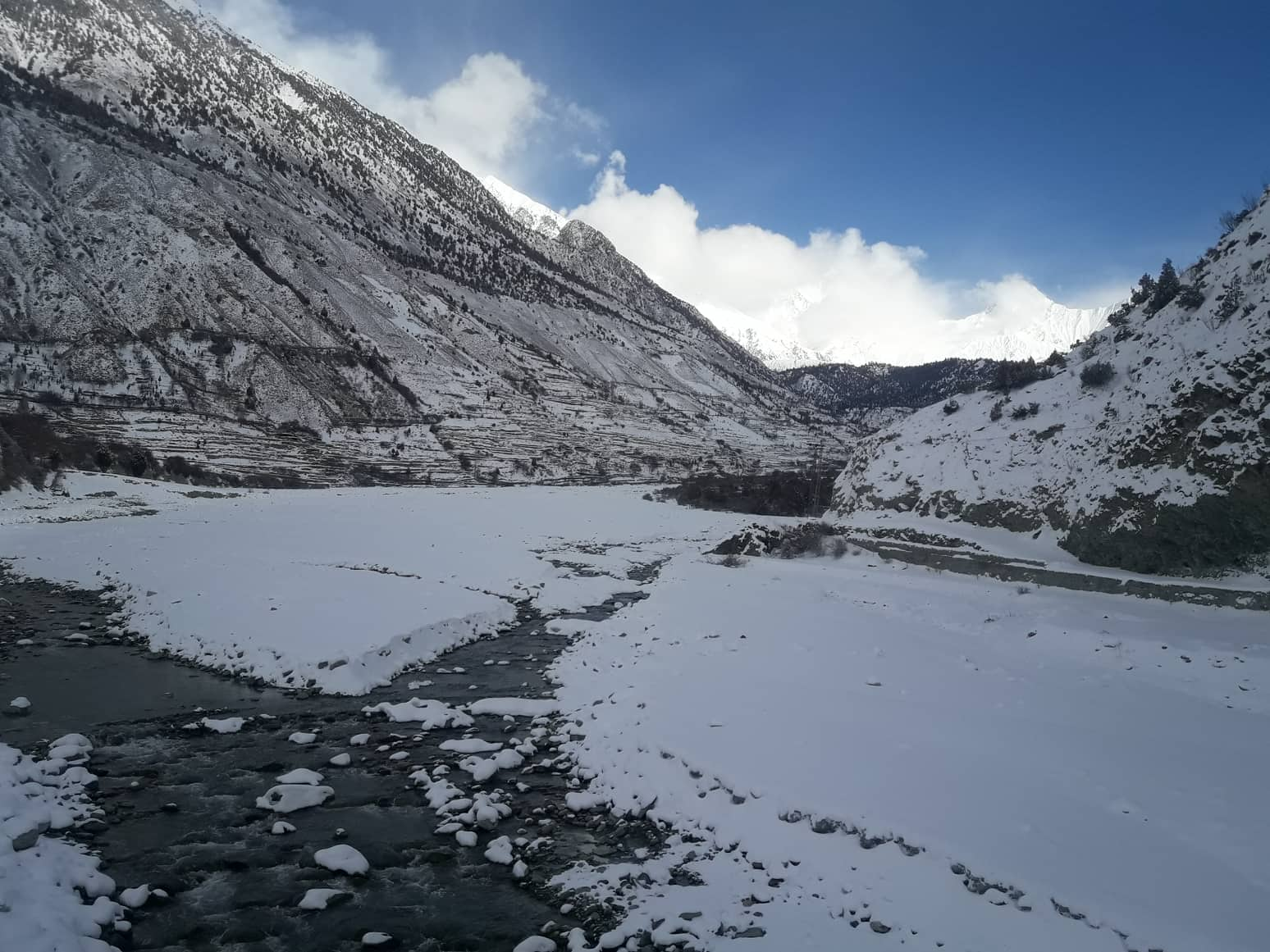

The Shina language is spoken and understood in all villages of Bagrote. The vernacular language of the Bagrote Valley is distinctive, and so is the local lifestyle, food, and culture. The Bagoreh form an ethnic group.

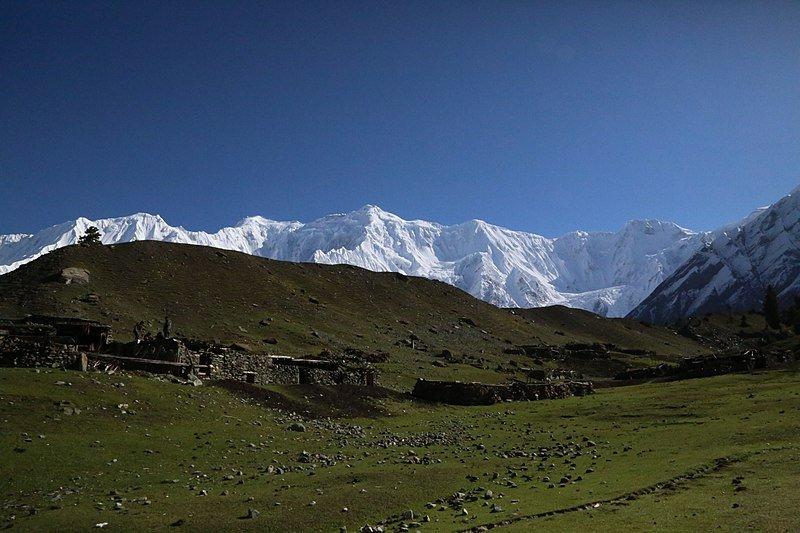

== Tourism and economy ==
Tourists visit this valley mostly in summer. The valley is about half an hour's drive from Gilgit city. This is the nearest tourist destination to Gilgit. The side of the Rakaposhi mountain towards Bagrot valley is better for camping due to the lush green forests and less crowd. This valley is known for its fruits and vegetables, also for the glaciers and high peaks. Vegetables, fruits, and other seasonal crops and Ice from the Glaciers during summers is transported from the valley to the capital Gilgit..

The villages that lie in the valley are interconnected by an unmetalled road. Villages on either side of the valley are linked via cable cars (allowing for easy transport of goods and livestock) and wooden bridges, the river passes underneath which comes from glaciers of Karakoram Range. The means of the economy is agriculture. However, with the recent construction of the Karakoram Highway, the area has been exposed to western civilization, with small cinemas, retail outlets for mountain equipment and apparel, and small hotels opening to facilitate visitors.

Locals grow wheat, tomatoes, potatoes, apples, pears, apricots, etc. in the valley.

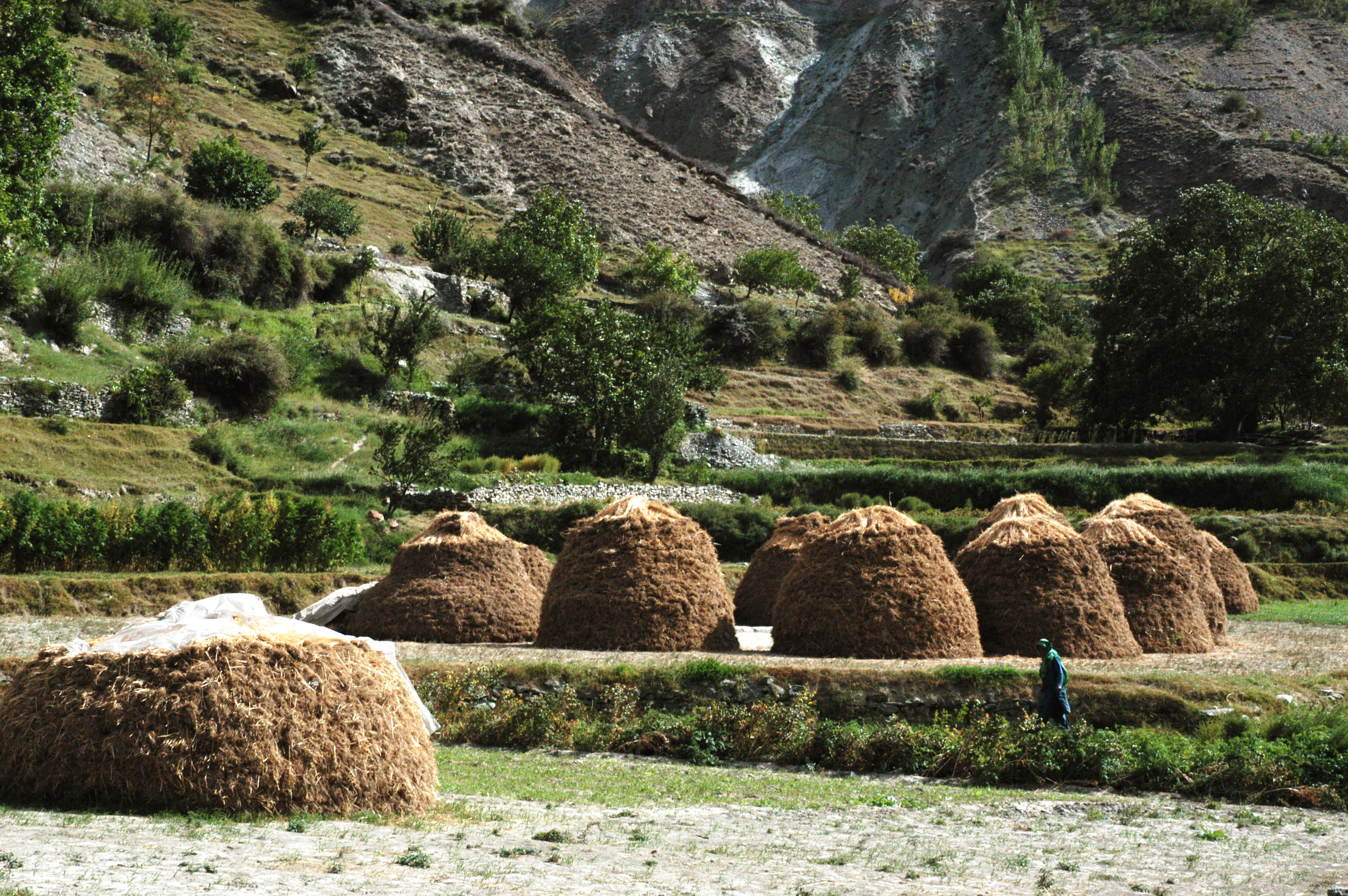
Bagrote Valley Wheat Harvest Chirah

== Nearby cities and valleys ==
- Hunza Valley
- Nagar Valley
- Gilgit City
- Naltar Valley
- Shigar valley
