= Haramosh Peak =

Mountain in the Karakoram range in Pakistan

Heramosh Peak
- ہراموش چوٹی
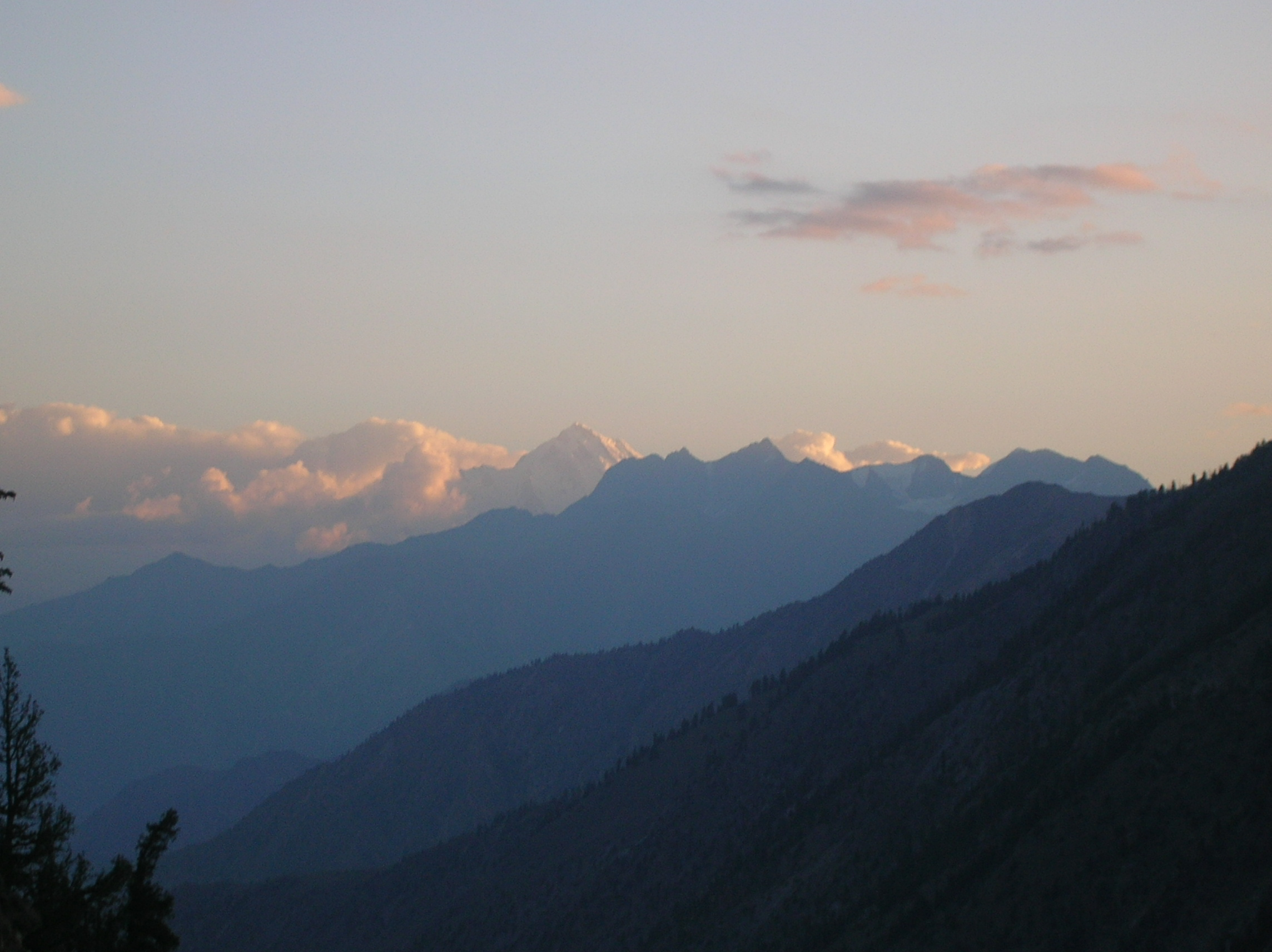
- Haramosh in 2008

Highest point
- Elevation: 7,409 m (24,308 ft); Ranked 67th
- Prominence: 2,277 m (7,470 ft)
- Listing: Ultra
- Coordinates: 35°50′24″N 74°53′51″E

Geography
- Location within Pakistan
- The major peaks in Karakoram are rank identified by height. Legend: 1：K2; 2：Gasherbrum I, K5; 3：Broad Peak; 4：Gasherbrum II, K4; 5：Gasherbrum III, K3a; 6：Gasherbrum IV, K3; 7：Distaghil Sar; 8：Kunyang Chhish; 9：Masherbrum, K1; 10：Batura Sar, Batura I; 11：Rakaposhi; 12：Batura II; 13：Kanjut Sar; 14：Saltoro Kangri, K10; 15：Batura III; 16： Saser Kangri I, K22; 17：Chogolisa; 18：Shispare; 19：Trivor Sar; 20：Skyang Kangri; 21：Mamostong Kangri, K35; 22：Saser Kangri II; 23：Saser Kangri III; 24：Pumari Chhish; 25：Passu Sar; 26：Yukshin Gardan Sar; 27：Teram Kangri I; 28：Malubiting; 29：K12; 30：Sia Kangri; 31：Momhil Sar; 32：Skil Brum; 33：Haramosh Peak; 34：Ghent Kangri; 35：Ultar Sar; 36：Rimo Massif; 37：Sherpi Kangri; 38：Yazghil Dome South; 39：Baltoro Kangri; 40：Crown Peak; 41：Baintha Brakk; 42：Yutmaru Sar; 43：K6; 44：Muztagh Tower; 45：Diran; 46：Apsarasas Kangri I; 47：Rimo III; 48：Gasherbrum V; Location in Pakistan
- Location: Gilgit–Baltistan, Pakistan
- Parent range: Rakaposhi-Haramosh Mountains, Karakoram

Climbing
- First ascent: 1958 by an Austrian team
- Easiest route: rock/snow/ice climb

Haramosh Peak
- Simplified Chinese: 哈拉莫什峰
Transcriptions

Haramosh Peak (Urdu: ہراموش چوٹی), also known as Haramosh or Peak 58, is a Karakoram range mountain located in Gilgit-Baltistan, Pakistan. The 7,409-metre Haramosh Peak is situated roughly 65 kilometres (40 mi) to the east of Gilgit, within the south-central part of the Rakaposhi-Haramosh Mountains, which is a subrange of the Karakoram range. This mountain rises steeply above the north bank of the Indus River, just upstream from its confluence with the Gilgit River.

The Haramosh massif consists of two main summits: Haramosh Peak and Haramosh Kutwal Laila Peak. The Haramosh Peak was first successfully climbed in 1958 by an Austrian team comprising Heini Roiss, Stephan Pauer, and Dr. Franz Mandl.

== Climbing history ==
Haramosh was first reconnoitered in 1947 when a Swiss team explored the area. Subsequently, in 1955, a German team investigated a potential northeastern route to the mountain. However, it was in 1957 that Haramosh became the site of an ill-fated expedition. A team from Oxford University, consisting of Tony Streather, John Emery, Bernard Jillot, and Rae Culbert, attempted to conquer the peak but faced a series of mishaps and misfortunes during their ascent. This expedition led to the loss of Bernard Jillot and Rae Culbert's lives, while Tony Streather and John Emery survived. Emery, however, endured severe frostbite and lost all of his fingers and toes as a result of the ordeal. The epic tale of this expedition is told in Ralph Barker's The Last Blue Mountain.

Haramosh was first climbed on 4 August 1958 by three Austrian mountaineers: Heinrich Roiss, Stefan Pauer and Franz Mandl, via the Haramosh La (a saddle to the northeast) and the East Ridge, roughly the route of the 1957 tragedy.

According to the Himalayan Index, there have been only three more ascents, in 1978 (Japanese, West Ridge), 1979 (unknown party/route), and 1988 (Polish, Southwest Face).

== Sources ==
- Neate, Jill (1989). High Asia: An Illustrated History of the 7000 Metre Peaks. Seattle: The Mountaineers. ISBN 0-89886-238-8.
- Barker, Ralph (2020) [1959]. The Last Blue Mountain. London: Chatto & Windus. ISBN 978-1912560424.
- Barker, Ralph (2006). The Last Blue Mountain. Ripping Yarns.com. ISBN 1-904466-30-3.
- Wala, Jerzy (1990). "Orographical Sketch Map of the Karakoram". Swiss Foundation for Alpine Research. Archived from the original on 23 February 2008.
