= Laila Peak (Haramosh Valley) =

Mountain in Pakistan

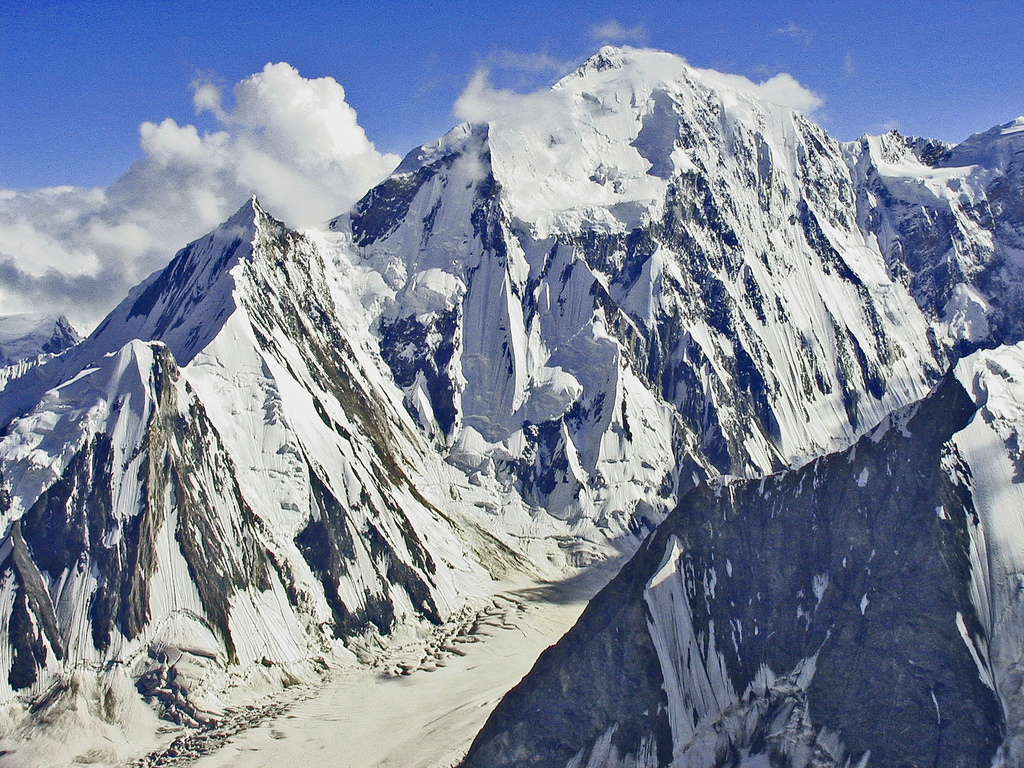
- Laila Peak in Haramosh Valley

Highest point
- Elevation: 6,985 m (22,917 ft)
- Prominence: 580 m (1,900 ft)

Geography
- Location within Pakistan
- Location: Haramosh Valley, Gilgit-Baltistan
- Parent range: Karakoram

Climbing
- First ascent: 1975 by Hekiryou Alpine Club of Japan
- Easiest route: ChogoLungma Glacier - Arundu Valley of Shiger

Laila Peak in the Arundu Valley of Baltistan region, (near Chogolungma Glacier) is 6,985 metres (22,917 ft) high. It was first climbed by the Hekiryou Alpine Club of Japan on 9 August 1975. The peak is one of the most beautiful peak in the range with difficult access to the summit. An important aspect of its climbing route is that, it is only accessible from ChogoLungma glacier via Arundu Valley of Shiger. The base camp is at a 3 days trek from the village. It is one of the three Laila Peaks situated in the Karakoram. The other two are in Hushe Valley and Astore Valley.

== See also ==
- Highest Mountains of the World
