= Danyor =

Danyore Shina: دیّور Dayyor
- City
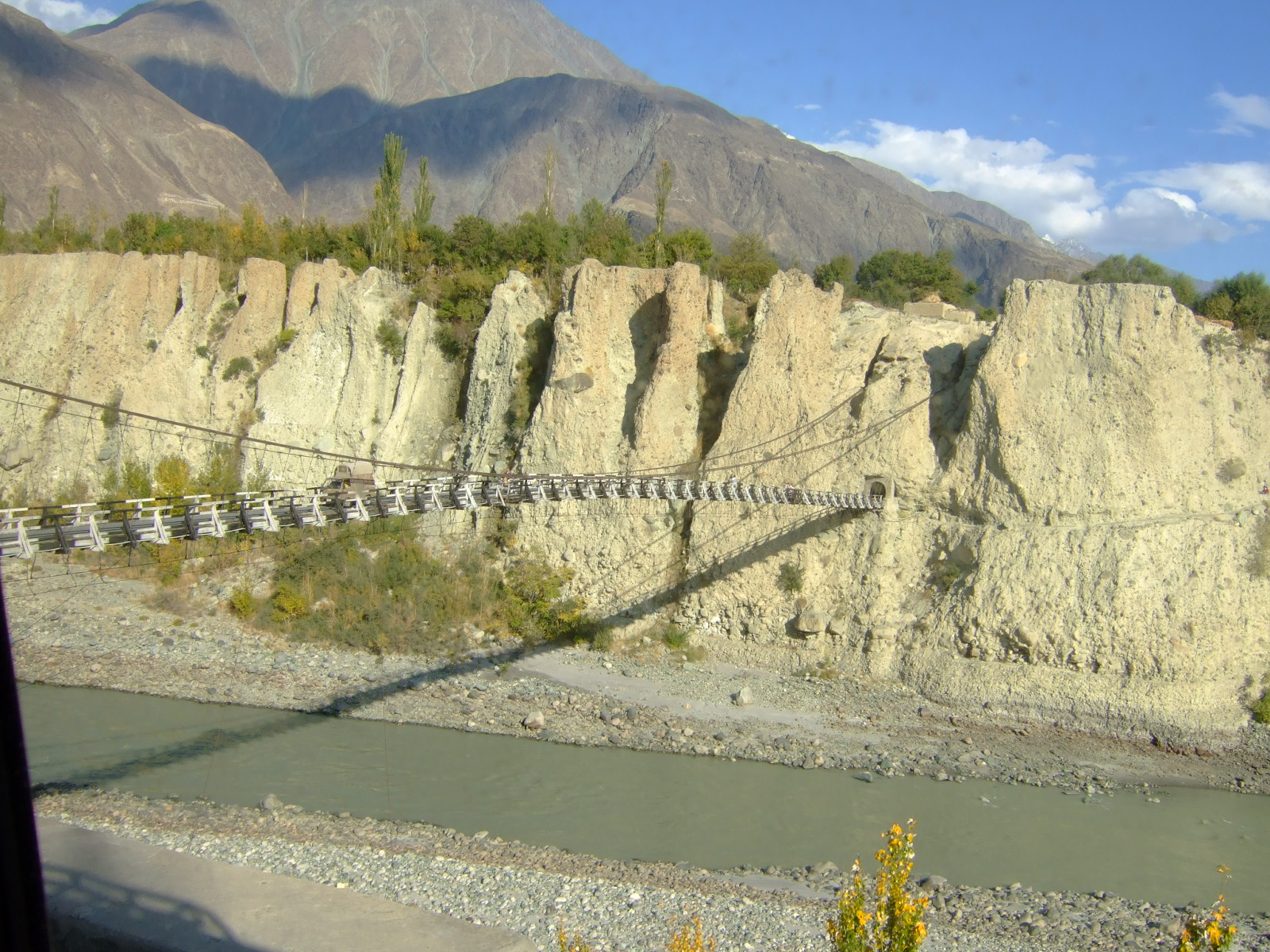
- Danyor is the location of the Danyor Suspension Bridge

- Location in Gilgit-Baltistan Danyore (Pakistan)
- Coordinates: 35°55′10″N 74°23′20″E
- Country: Pakistan
- Autonomous state: Gilgit-Baltistan
- District: Gilgit
- Elevation: 2,000 m (6,600 ft)

Population
  - Total: 25,000
- Demonym(s): Bagoreh, Brusho
- Time zone: UTC+5:30 (PST)
  - Summer (DST): +5
- Postal code: 15110

Danyor (Urdu:دنیور, Burushiski and Shina: دیّور) is a city in the namesake sub-division in the Gilgit-Baltistan region of northern Pakistan.

The city of Danyor is an administrative part of Gilgit District and lies across the Gilgit river on the outskirts of Gilgit. It is known for its green fields, and poplar trees. The world's highest paved road Karakoram Highway (KKH) passes through its landscape.

Out of the 200 Chinese engineers and workers who lost their lives during the 1966 to 1989 construction of the KKH, 88 are buried in Chinese Cemetery in Danyor.

== Important places ==
The Shrine of Shah Sultan Ali Arif r.a above the Danyore tunnel, the Chinese Graveyard near the Karakoram Highway and the rock inscriptions in the Chikas locality are the widely visited tourist attractions. Damaged Chinese Bridge of Danyor, The Danyor Suspension Bridge, which was constructed over a half-century ago, is quite a wonder; it connects the KIU Campus to the city. The Danyor end of the bridge enters a single-lane tunnel constructed by locals without any proper civil engineering equipment some five decades ago. During summers, local tourists frequently visit the Danyor Springs under the broken Chinese Bridge.

=== Damaged Chinese Bridge of Danyor ===
One of the earliest and longest composite bridges in Gilgit-Baltistan was the Chinese Bridge over river Gilgit on Karakoram Highway that partly collapsed in 2009 as a result of corroded pillar foundation. Initially, two out of nine spans fell into the river, and later due to unstable structure, another pillar and third span were collapsed. The bridge is closed since then due to loss of connection and a new bridge is constructed near that is completed in April 2016. The bridge had two guard quarters at extremities each with patio and parapet and the parapets are decorated with qilins.

== Suburbs ==
Some of the main suburbs in Danyor are:

- Majukaal
- Sharot
- Shinot
- Chikaskot
- Didingdass (Muhammadabad)
- Amphary
- Astaan Muhallah
- Mayon Gaali

== Health care ==
Danyor city has following healthcare facilities

- Aga Khan Health Centre
- Al-Hayaat Medical Centre
- Sehat Foundation Hospital

== Places nearby ==
- Gilgit City
- Jalalabad
- Nomal
- Jutal
- Bagrot
