= Momhil Sar =

Mountain in Pakistan

- Mumhail Sar
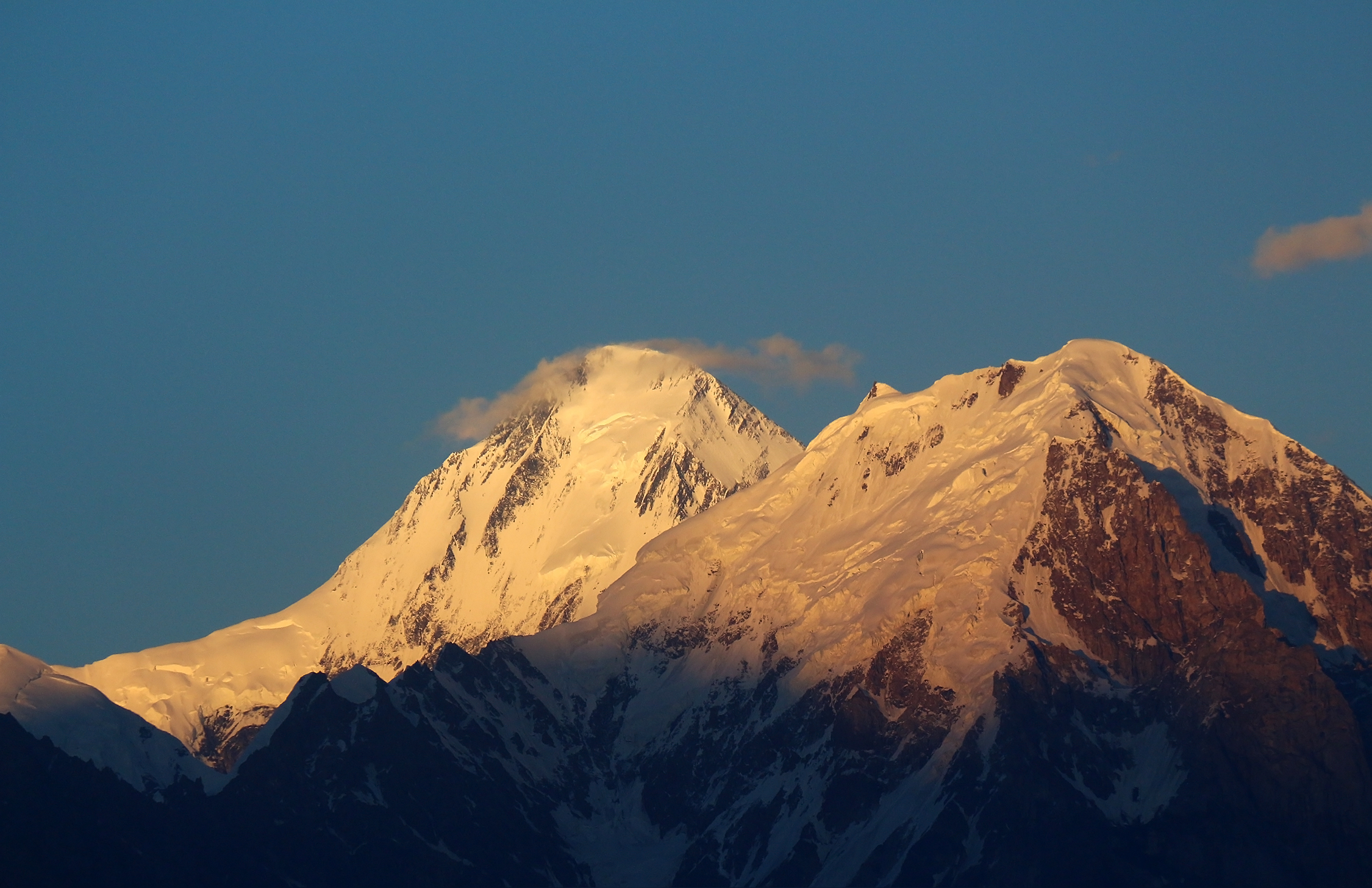
- Momhil Sar in 2014

Highest point
- Elevation: 7,414 m (24,324 ft); Ranked 64th
- Prominence: 980 m (3,220 ft)
- Parent peak: Trivor
- Listing: Mountains of Pakistan
- Coordinates: 36°19′10″N 75°02′06″E

Naming
- Native name: مومہل سر

Geography
- Location within Pakistan Location within Gilgit Baltistan
- The major peaks in Karakoram are rank identified by height. Legend: 1：K2; 2：Gasherbrum I, K5; 3：Broad Peak; 4：Gasherbrum II, K4; 5：Gasherbrum III, K3a; 6：Gasherbrum IV, K3; 7：Distaghil Sar; 8：Kunyang Chhish; 9：Masherbrum, K1; 10：Batura Sar, Batura I; 11：Rakaposhi; 12：Batura II; 13：Kanjut Sar; 14：Saltoro Kangri, K10; 15：Batura III; 16： Saser Kangri I, K22; 17：Chogolisa; 18：Shispare; 19：Trivor Sar; 20：Skyang Kangri; 21：Mamostong Kangri, K35; 22：Saser Kangri II; 23：Saser Kangri III; 24：Pumari Chhish; 25：Passu Sar; 26：Yukshin Gardan Sar; 27：Teram Kangri I; 28：Malubiting; 29：K12; 30：Sia Kangri; 31：Momhil Sar; 32：Skil Brum; 33：Haramosh Peak; 34：Ghent Kangri; 35：Ultar Sar; 36：Rimo Massif; 37：Sherpi Kangri; 38：Yazghil Dome South; 39：Baltoro Kangri; 40：Crown Peak; 41：Baintha Brakk; 42：Yutmaru Sar; 43：K6; 44：Muztagh Tower; 45：Diran; 46：Apsarasas Kangri I; 47：Rimo III; 48：Gasherbrum V; Location in Gilgit-Baltistan
- Location: Shimshal, Gojal, Gilgit-Baltistan, Pakistan
- Parent range: Karakoram

Climbing
- First ascent: 1964

Momhil Sar
- Traditional Chinese: 莫慕希爾峰
Transcriptions

Momhil Sar (Urdu: مومہل سر) is, at 7,414 metres (24,324 ft) above sea level, the 64th highest mountain peak in the world. It is situated in Shimshal Valley, the Hispar Muztagh subrange of the Karakoram range, a few kilometres to the north-west of its parent peak Trivor in Gilgit-Baltistan, Pakistan.

A group from the Styrian High-touring Section of the Austrian Alpine Association, led by Hanns Schell, made the first ascent on June 29, 1964. Initially they attempted to climb the southeast ridge but were unsuccessful so a few days later they returned to Camp 3 and crossed the southeast wall of Momhil Sar, Rudolf Pischinger, Hanns Schell, Horst Schindelbacher, Leo Schlömmer and Rudolf Widerhofer then reached the summit via the south ridge.
