= Rimo Massif =

Massif in the eastern Karakoram

Rimo I
- Rimo Kangri I
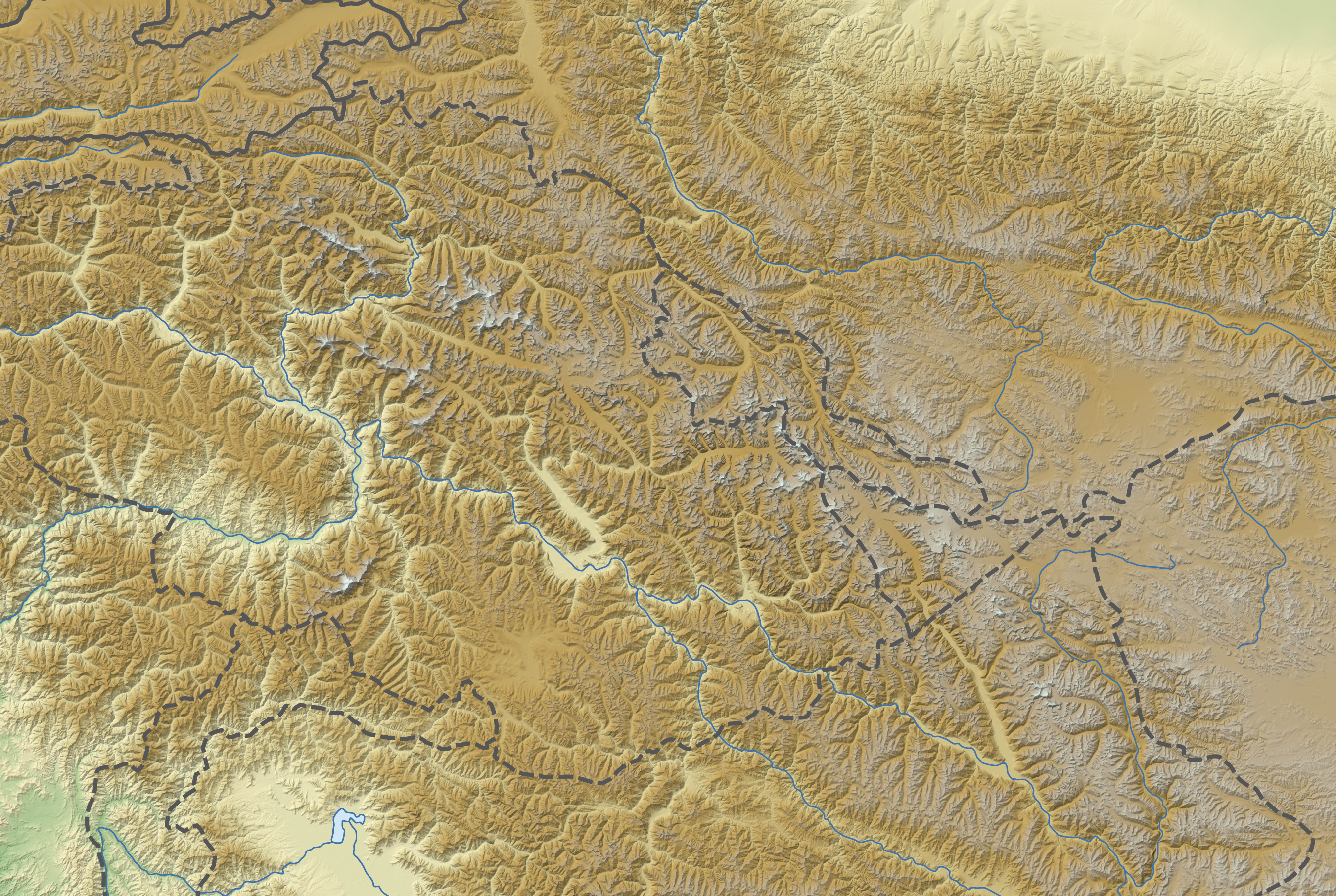
- Location within Karakoram Location within Ladakh Location within India
- The major peaks in Karakoram are rank identified by height. Legend: 1：K2; 2：Gasherbrum I, K5; 3：Broad Peak; 4：Gasherbrum II, K4; 5：Gasherbrum III, K3a; 6：Gasherbrum IV, K3; 7：Distaghil Sar; 8：Kunyang Chhish; 9：Masherbrum, K1; 10：Batura Sar, Batura I; 11：Rakaposhi; 12：Batura II; 13：Kanjut Sar; 14：Saltoro Kangri, K10; 15：Batura III; 16： Saser Kangri I, K22; 17：Chogolisa; 18：Shispare; 19：Trivor Sar; 20：Skyang Kangri; 21：Mamostong Kangri, K35; 22：Saser Kangri II; 23：Saser Kangri III; 24：Pumari Chhish; 25：Passu Sar; 26：Yukshin Gardan Sar; 27：Teram Kangri I; 28：Malubiting; 29：K12; 30：Sia Kangri; 31：Momhil Sar; 32：Skil Brum; 33：Haramosh Peak; 34：Ghent Kangri; 35：Ultar Sar; 36：Rimo Massif; 37：Sherpi Kangri; 38：Yazghil Dome South; 39：Baltoro Kangri; 40：Crown Peak; 41：Baintha Brakk; 42：Yutmaru Sar; 43：K6; 44：Muztagh Tower; 45：Diran; 46：Apsarasas Kangri I; 47：Rimo III; 48：Gasherbrum V; Location of the Rimo Massif within the greater Karakoram region

Highest point
- Elevation: 7,385 m (24,229 ft); Ranked 71st
- Prominence: 1,438 m (4,718 ft)
- Coordinates: 35°21′21″N 77°22′05″E

Geography
- Location: India (Note: India is in de facto control of this region of Kashmir; the region is claimed by Pakistan. See e.g. The Future of Kashmir on the BBC website.)
- Parent range: Rimo Muztagh, Karakoram

Climbing
- First ascent: July 28, 1988 by Nima Dorje Sherpa, Tsewang Samanla (India); Yoshio Ogata, Hideki Yoshida (Japan)
- Easiest route: South Face/Southwest Ridge

Rimo Massif
- Simplified Chinese: 里莫I峰
Transcriptions

The Rimo Massif lies in the northern part of the remote Rimo Muztagh, a subrange of the Karakoram range. It is located about 20 km northeast of the snout of the Siachen Glacier and its main summit, Rimo I (alternatively Rimo Kangri I) is the world's 71st highest mountain with an elevation of 7,385 metres (24,229 ft). The massif heads the large Central Rimo Glacier (on the north side) and South Rimo Glacier (on the east side), as well as the smaller North Terong Glacier (on the west side).

Rimo means "striped mountain". The Rimo Glacier, drains to the Shyok river. Due to its remote location in the heart of the eastern Karakoram, Rimo was little-known and almost entirely unvisited until the twentieth century. Explorers Filippo De Filippi and Philip and Jenny Visser visited the area in 1914 and 1929 respectively. Adding to its isolation is the unsettled political and military situation between India and Pakistan in the region, especially the conflict around the nearby Siachen Glacier. This means that India controls access to the massif.

View from space of Rimo Massif
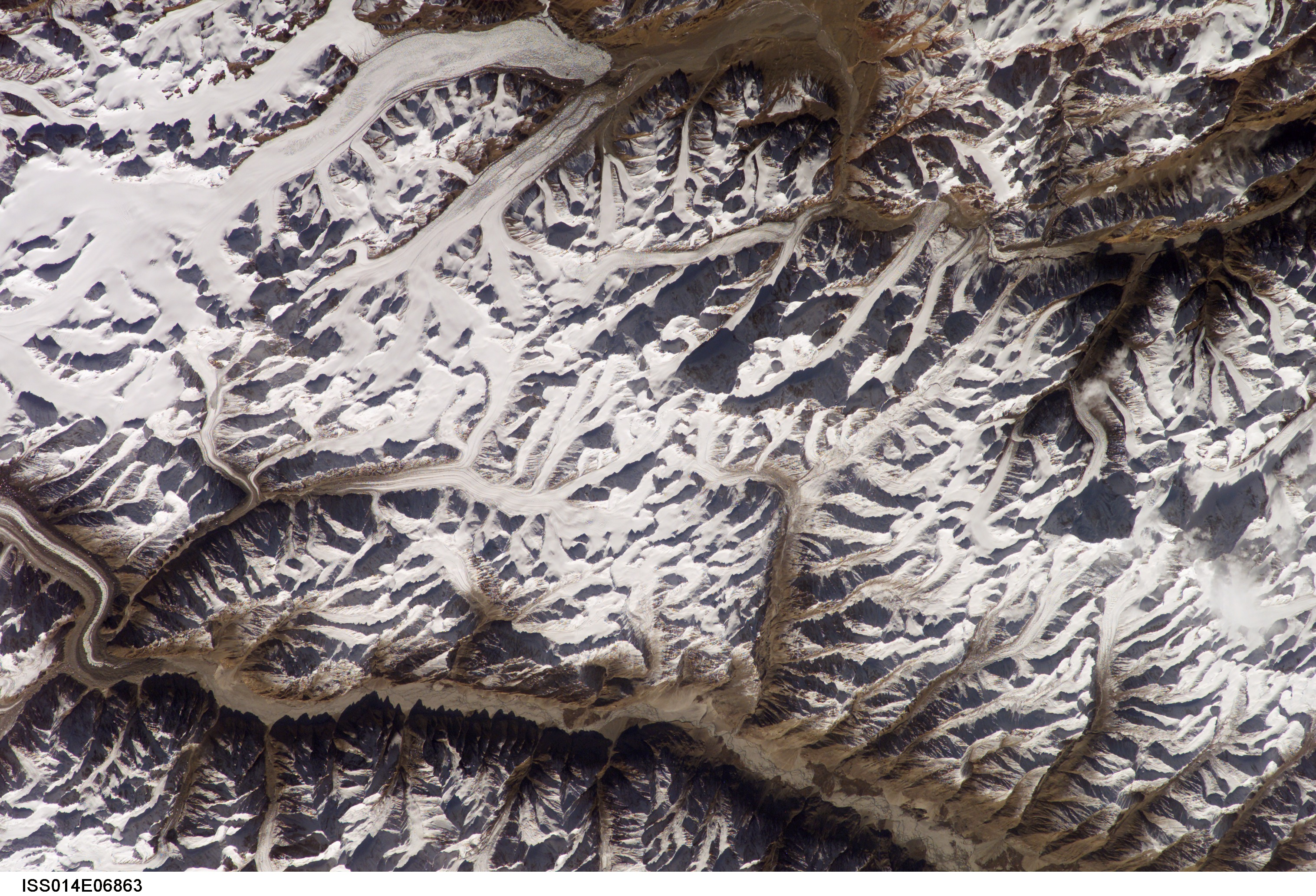

== Peaks ==
The Rimo Massif consists of six peaks sharing the Rimo name. In addition to Rimo I, they are:

Peak name	Alternative name	Elevation m (ft)	Prominence m (ft)	Coordinates
Rimo II	Rimo Kangri II	7,373 m (24,190 ft)	73 m (240 ft)	35°21′N 77°22′E
Rimo III	Rimo Kangri III	7,233 m (23,730 ft)	615 m (2,018 ft)	35°22′31″N 77°21′42″E
Rimo IV	Rimo Kangri IV	7,169 m (23,520 ft)	329 m (1,079 ft)	35°23′N 77°23′E
Rimo V	Rimo Kangri V	6,882 m (22,579 ft)	262 m (860 ft)	35°24′N 77°23′E
Rimo VI	Rimo Kangri VI	6,846 m (22,461 ft)	446 m (1,463 ft)	35°25′N 77°23′E

Rimo II is a minor subpeak located about 150 m (490 ft) northeast of Rimo I, on its north ridge. The others are more independent peaks further north.

Rimo III is the 98th highest mountain in the world (Rimo II is unranked, lacking sufficient prominence). Rimo III has an altitude of 7,233 m. It is located about 2.4 km north of Rimo Kangri I (7385 m) and its subsidiary peak Rimo Kangri II ( 7373 m ), with which it is connected by a ridge. On its northern slope lies the Middle Rimo Glacier, on the southeast slope the Southern Rimo Glacier. On the southwest slope of the mountain flows the Northern Terong Glacier.

Rimo IV, or Rimo Kangri IV is 7,169 m high and located 1.6 km to the east of Rimo III. It is considered a secondary peak due to its low ridge height of 329 m.

Rimo V is 1.95 km beyond Rimo IV, and rises to an altitude of 6,882 m.

Rimo Kangri VI sits 2.59 km north-northwest and rises 6,846 m.

== Climbing history ==
The first attempts on the Rimo Massif were in 1978, by a Japanese expedition which had little success, in 1984 (first ascent of Rimo IV, by an Indian army expedition) and in 1985, by a well-organized Indian/British expedition led by famed Himalayan expert Harish Kapadia. That expedition climbed Rimo III on 14 July 1985 and was summited by Britons Dave Wilkinson and Jim Fotheringham via the northeast ridge.

The first, and only ascent of Rimo I was made in 1988 by an Indian/Japanese team led by Hukam Singh and Yoshio Ogata. They climbed the south face to the southwest ridge, starting from a significant pass called Ibex Col on the south side of the mountain. The ascent involved 1500 m of significant technical climbing.

== See also ==
- List of highest mountains on Earth
