= Passu Sar =

Mountain in Pakistan

Passu Sar پسو سر
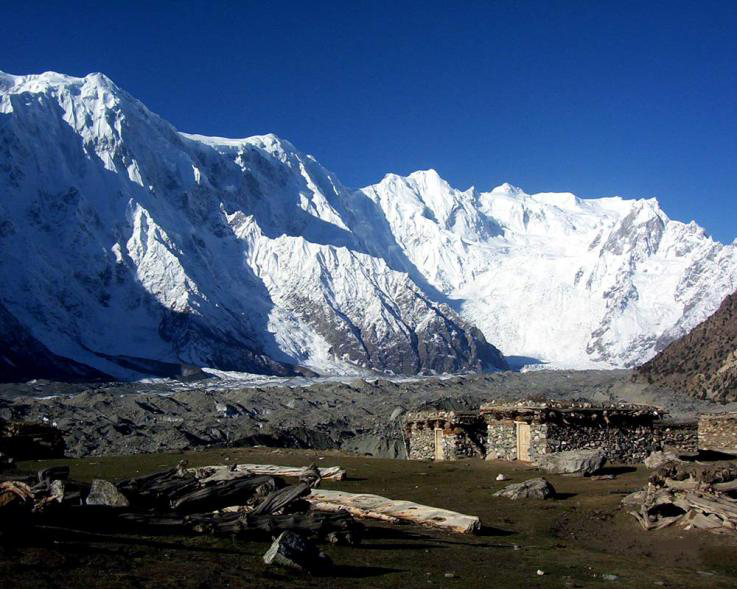
- North face of the so called Batura wall with Passu (left half) and Batura (right half) massifs. Passu Sar is the summit on the left of the col in the center. On the right there are Muchu Chhish and Batura I-III.

Highest point
- Elevation: 7,478 m (24,534 ft); Ranked 54th
- Prominence: 647 m (2,123 ft)
- Listing: Mountains of Pakistan
- Coordinates: 36°29′16″N 74°35′16″E

Geography
- Location within Karakoram Location within Gilgit Baltistan Location within Pakistan
- The major peaks in Karakoram are rank identified by height. Legend: 1：K2; 2：Gasherbrum I, K5; 3：Broad Peak; 4：Gasherbrum II, K4; 5：Gasherbrum III, K3a; 6：Gasherbrum IV, K3; 7：Distaghil Sar; 8：Kunyang Chhish; 9：Masherbrum, K1; 10：Batura Sar, Batura I; 11：Rakaposhi; 12：Batura II; 13：Kanjut Sar; 14：Saltoro Kangri, K10; 15：Batura III; 16： Saser Kangri I, K22; 17：Chogolisa; 18：Shispare; 19：Trivor Sar; 20：Skyang Kangri; 21：Mamostong Kangri, K35; 22：Saser Kangri II; 23：Saser Kangri III; 24：Pumari Chhish; 25：Passu Sar; 26：Yukshin Gardan Sar; 27：Teram Kangri I; 28：Malubiting; 29：K12; 30：Sia Kangri; 31：Momhil Sar; 32：Skil Brum; 33：Haramosh Peak; 34：Ghent Kangri; 35：Ultar Sar; 36：Rimo Massif; 37：Sherpi Kangri; 38：Yazghil Dome South; 39：Baltoro Kangri; 40：Crown Peak; 41：Baintha Brakk; 42：Yutmaru Sar; 43：K6; 44：Muztagh Tower; 45：Diran; 46：Apsarasas Kangri I; 47：Rimo III; 48：Gasherbrum V; Location in Gilgit-Baltistan
- Location: Hunza District, Gilgit-Baltistan, Pakistan
- Parent range: Batura Muztagh, Karakoram

Climbing
- First ascent: 7 August 1994 by Max Wallner, Dirk Naumann, Ralf Lehmann, Volker Wurnig

Passu Sar
- Simplified Chinese: 帕蘇峰
Transcriptions

Passu Sar (Urdu: پسو سر; or Passu I) is a mountain peak in the Batura Muztagh, a sub-range of the Karakoram mountain range, in the Hunza District of Gilgit-Baltistan, Pakistan. It is the high point of the Passu massif, which also includes Passu Diar (or "Passu East", "Pasu II"). The peak lies on the main ridge of the Batura Muztagh, about 7 km (4.3 mi) east of Batura Sar.

The date of the first successful ascent of Passu Sar is disputed. It was said to have been first climbed in 1978 by a Japanese-Pakistani team, in an expedition which claimed the life of Japanese climber Toshio Takahashi, who fell into a crevasse at 5,800 meters. Another report dates the first ascent on 7 August 1994 by the German team of Max Wallner, Dirk Naumann, Ralf Lehmann, and Volker Wurnig.

== See also ==
- Gojal
- Passu
- Hunza
- Highest mountains of the world
