= Trivor =

Mountain in Pakistan

- ترِووُر
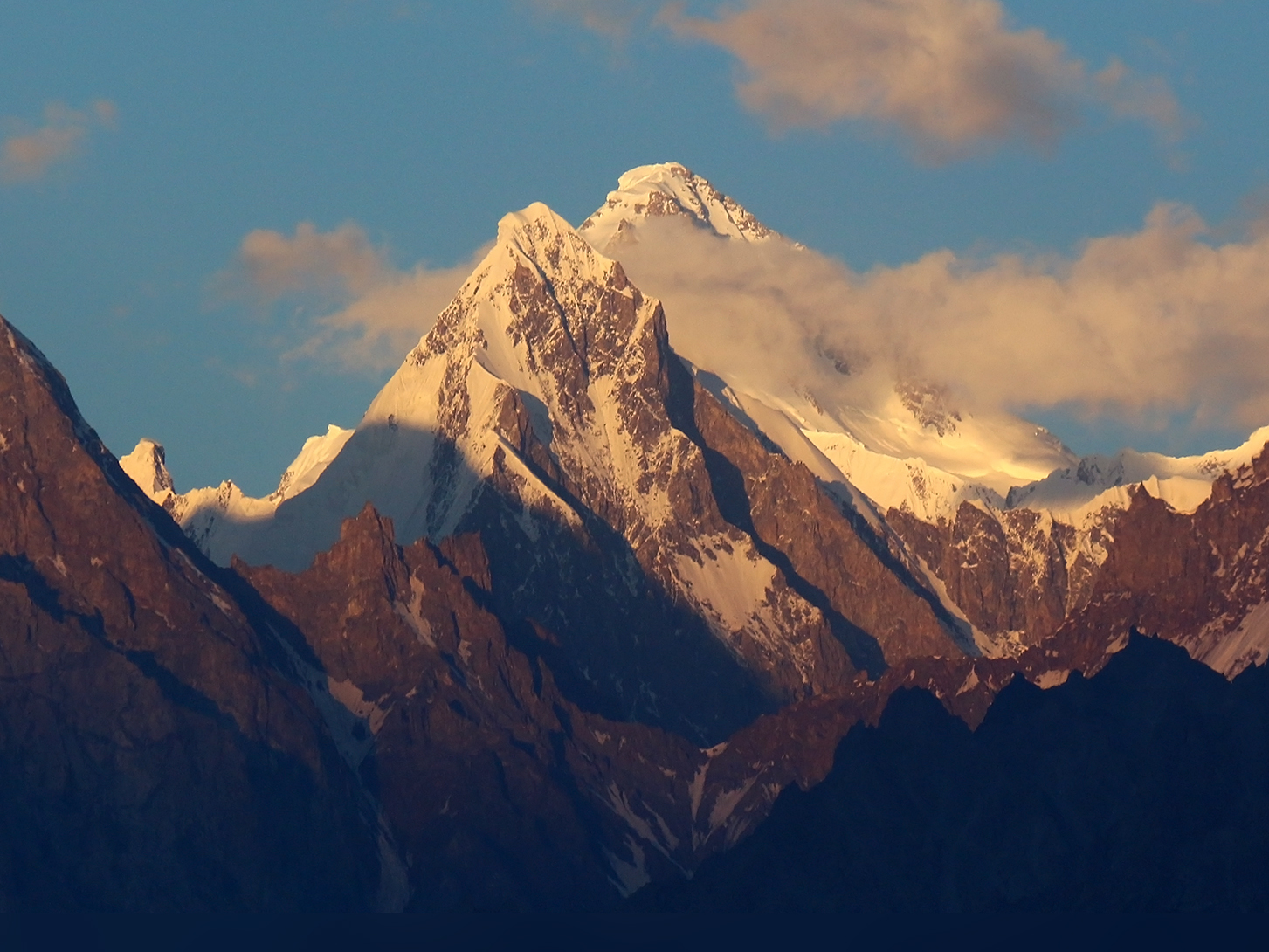
- Trivor as viewed from Aliabad

Highest point
- Elevation: 7,577 m (24,859 ft); Ranked 39th
- Prominence: 980 m (3,220 ft)
- Coordinates: 36°17′15″N 75°05′10″E

Geography
- Location within Pakistan Location within Gilgit Baltistan
- The major peaks in Karakoram are rank identified by height. Legend: 1：K2; 2：Gasherbrum I, K5; 3：Broad Peak; 4：Gasherbrum II, K4; 5：Gasherbrum III, K3a; 6：Gasherbrum IV, K3; 7：Distaghil Sar; 8：Kunyang Chhish; 9：Masherbrum, K1; 10：Batura Sar, Batura I; 11：Rakaposhi; 12：Batura II; 13：Kanjut Sar; 14：Saltoro Kangri, K10; 15：Batura III; 16： Saser Kangri I, K22; 17：Chogolisa; 18：Shispare; 19：Trivor Sar; 20：Skyang Kangri; 21：Mamostong Kangri, K35; 22：Saser Kangri II; 23：Saser Kangri III; 24：Pumari Chhish; 25：Passu Sar; 26：Yukshin Gardan Sar; 27：Teram Kangri I; 28：Malubiting; 29：K12; 30：Sia Kangri; 31：Momhil Sar; 32：Skil Brum; 33：Haramosh Peak; 34：Ghent Kangri; 35：Ultar Sar; 36：Rimo Massif; 37：Sherpi Kangri; 38：Yazghil Dome South; 39：Baltoro Kangri; 40：Crown Peak; 41：Baintha Brakk; 42：Yutmaru Sar; 43：K6; 44：Muztagh Tower; 45：Diran; 46：Apsarasas Kangri I; 47：Rimo III; 48：Gasherbrum V; Location in Pakistan
- Location: Gilgit District, Gilgit-Baltistan, Pakistan
- Parent range: Hispar Muztagh

Climbing
- First ascent: 1960 by Wilfrid Noyce, Jack Sadler (British/US)
- Easiest route: Northwest Ridge: glacier/snow/ice climb

Trivor (Urdu: ترِووُر or Trivor Sar) is one of the high mountain peaks of the Hispar Muztagh, a subrange of the Karakoram range in the Shimshal Valley, Gilgit-Baltistan of Pakistan. Its height is often given as 7,728 metres (25,354 ft), but this elevation is not consistent with photographic evidence. The height given here is from a Russian 1:100,000 topographic map.

The first ascent of Trivor was made by a British–American party, Wilfrid Noyce (UK) and Jack Sadler (USA) reached the summit on 17 August 1960. They climbed from the Trivor Glacier, which runs towards the peak from the south-west, and gained the high col at the foot of the northwest ridge which they then followed to reach the summit. One of the members of the expedition team, Don Whillans, had shipped his motorbike (a 650cc Triumph Trophy) to Pakistan from the UK and after his climbing partners departed, he drove solo by motorbike the 7,000 miles from Rawalpindi to the UK.

There has been only one other successful ascent of the peak in the 64 years since Noyce and Sadler reached the summit.

In 1991 Atsushi Endo and Toshifumi Onuki made the second ascent. They also took the northwest ridge to the summit but they started from the north side, from the Momhil Glacier, and climbed a northeast-facing spur to gain the east ridge of the neighbouring Momhil Sar, they then descended to the col at the foot of Trivor’s northwest ridge and so to the summit.

== Sources ==
- Jerzy Wala, Orographical Sketch Map of the Karakoram, Swiss Foundation for Alpine Research, Zurich, 1990.
- Neate, Jill (1989). High Asia: An Illustrated History of the 7000 Metre Peaks. Seattle: The Mountaineers. ISBN 0-89886-238-8.
