= Batura III =

Mountain in Pakistan

- بتورا 3
- Location within Pakistan Location within Gilgit Baltistan
- The major peaks in Karakoram are rank identified by height. Legend: 1：K2; 2：Gasherbrum I, K5; 3：Broad Peak; 4：Gasherbrum II, K4; 5：Gasherbrum III, K3a; 6：Gasherbrum IV, K3; 7：Distaghil Sar; 8：Kunyang Chhish; 9：Masherbrum, K1; 10：Batura Sar, Batura I; 11：Rakaposhi; 12：Batura II; 13：Kanjut Sar; 14：Saltoro Kangri, K10; 15：Batura III; 16： Saser Kangri I, K22; 17：Chogolisa; 18：Shispare; 19：Trivor Sar; 20：Skyang Kangri; 21：Mamostong Kangri, K35; 22：Saser Kangri II; 23：Saser Kangri III; 24：Pumari Chhish; 25：Passu Sar; 26：Yukshin Gardan Sar; 27：Teram Kangri I; 28：Malubiting; 29：K12; 30：Sia Kangri; 31：Momhil Sar; 32：Skil Brum; 33：Haramosh Peak; 34：Ghent Kangri; 35：Ultar Sar; 36：Rimo Massif; 37：Sherpi Kangri; 38：Yazghil Dome South; 39：Baltoro Kangri; 40：Crown Peak; 41：Baintha Brakk; 42：Yutmaru Sar; 43：K6; 44：Muztagh Tower; 45：Diran; 46：Apsarasas Kangri I; 47：Rimo III; 48：Gasherbrum V; Location in Gilgit-Baltistan

Highest point
- Elevation: 7,729 m (25,358 ft)
- Prominence: 104 m (341 ft)
- Isolation: 1.34 km (0.83 mi) to Batura II
- Listing: Mountains of Pakistan
- Coordinates: 36°31′51″N 74°30′05″E

Geography
- Location: Gilgit-Baltistan, Pakistan.
- Parent range: Karakoram

Batura III
- Simplified Chinese: 巴托拉III峰
Transcriptions

Batura III (Urdu: بتورا 3), also known as Batura Muztagh III, is a 7,729-metre-high (25,358 ft) peak in Batura Muztagh, Pakistan, which is the westernmost subrange of the Karakoram range.

== Location ==
Batura III lies in the Batura Muztagh, which is a part of the Karakoram range, lying west of the Hunza River. Together with Batura I, Batura II, Batura IV, and other lower peaks, Batura II forms part of the Batura Wall.
