= Yazghil Dome South =

High mountain, located in Pakistan

- Disteghil Sar South, Wala Hispar Peak 57
- Location within Karakoram Location within Gilgit Baltistan Location within Southern Xinjiang
- The major peaks in Karakoram are rank identified by height. Legend: 1：K2; 2：Gasherbrum I, K5; 3：Broad Peak; 4：Gasherbrum II, K4; 5：Gasherbrum III, K3a; 6：Gasherbrum IV, K3; 7：Distaghil Sar; 8：Kunyang Chhish; 9：Masherbrum, K1; 10：Batura Sar, Batura I; 11：Rakaposhi; 12：Batura II; 13：Kanjut Sar; 14：Saltoro Kangri, K10; 15：Batura III; 16： Saser Kangri I, K22; 17：Chogolisa; 18：Shispare; 19：Trivor Sar; 20：Skyang Kangri; 21：Mamostong Kangri, K35; 22：Saser Kangri II; 23：Saser Kangri III; 24：Pumari Chhish; 25：Passu Sar; 26：Yukshin Gardan Sar; 27：Teram Kangri I; 28：Malubiting; 29：K12; 30：Sia Kangri; 31：Momhil Sar; 32：Skil Brum; 33：Haramosh Peak; 34：Ghent Kangri; 35：Ultar Sar; 36：Rimo Massif; 37：Sherpi Kangri; 38：Yazghil Dome South; 39：Baltoro Kangri; 40：Crown Peak; 41：Baintha Brakk; 42：Yutmaru Sar; 43：K6; 44：Muztagh Tower; 45：Diran; 46：Apsarasas Kangri I; 47：Rimo III; 48：Gasherbrum V

Highest point
- Elevation: 7,365 m (24,163 ft)
- Prominence: 305 m (1,001 ft)
- Coordinates: 36°18′29″N 75°13′54″E

Geography
- Location: Pakistan in Gilgit–Baltistan
- Parent range: Karakoram

Climbing
- Easiest route: snow/ice climb

Yazghil Dome South (also known as Disteghil Sar South, Wala Hispar Peak 57), at a height of 7,365 m (24,163 ft) is part of the Karakoram range. It would be one of the highest peaks on Earth if it had more topographic prominence but is within 305 m (1,001 ft) prominence and only about 5 km (3.1 mi) away from the major peak of one of the mountains in the top twenty. (Note: The names Disteghil Sar South and Wala Hispar Peak 57 are historical. There are two Yazghil Domes North and South, without the North Dome having a name associated with Disteghil Sar. If the Yazgihil Dome South is named as part of Disteghil Sar which has west, central and east peaks close together, confusion could arise. Ranking of the highest peaks may be based on 500 meters of clean prominence.) This is Distaghil Sar at 7,885 m (25,869 ft) at a distance of 4.39 km (2.73 mi) WNW on the same ridge line. South at 11.67 km (7.25 mi) is Kunyang Chhish at 7,852 m (25,761 ft). The two Yazghil Domes, North and South ice-field's feed to the south and east the Yazghil glacier and to their north the Malangutti glacier. The latter glacier is on the eastern flank of Malangutti Sar. The dome peaks should not be confused with the lower mountain of Yazghil Sar 15 km (9.3 mi) to the northeast.

== History ==
The area between the Yazghil and Malangutti glaciers was first surveyed by Europeans in the 1911/12 Dutch Visser-Hooft expedition. This identified Distaghil Sar as the highest Himalayan summit west of K2. A Polish expedition climbed Yazghil Dome South in 1981. Attempts to climb it in 1989 were abandoned.
