= The Crown (mountain) =

Mountain in Xinjiang, China

- Huang Guan Shan
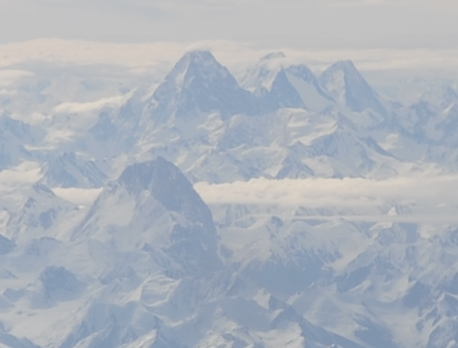
- The Crown (bottom left) with K2, Broad Peak and Gasherbrum group above

Highest point
- Elevation: 7,295 m (23,934 ft); Ranked 83rd
- Prominence: 1,919 m (6,296 ft)
- Listing: Mountains of China; Ultra
- Coordinates: 36°06′30″N 76°12′45″E

Geography
- Location within Southern Xinjiang
- The major peaks in Karakoram are rank identified by height. Legend: 1：K2; 2：Gasherbrum I, K5; 3：Broad Peak; 4：Gasherbrum II, K4; 5：Gasherbrum III, K3a; 6：Gasherbrum IV, K3; 7：Distaghil Sar; 8：Kunyang Chhish; 9：Masherbrum, K1; 10：Batura Sar, Batura I; 11：Rakaposhi; 12：Batura II; 13：Kanjut Sar; 14：Saltoro Kangri, K10; 15：Batura III; 16： Saser Kangri I, K22; 17：Chogolisa; 18：Shispare; 19：Trivor Sar; 20：Skyang Kangri; 21：Mamostong Kangri, K35; 22：Saser Kangri II; 23：Saser Kangri III; 24：Pumari Chhish; 25：Passu Sar; 26：Yukshin Gardan Sar; 27：Teram Kangri I; 28：Malubiting; 29：K12; 30：Sia Kangri; 31：Momhil Sar; 32：Skil Brum; 33：Haramosh Peak; 34：Ghent Kangri; 35：Ultar Sar; 36：Rimo Massif; 37：Sherpi Kangri; 38：Yazghil Dome South; 39：Baltoro Kangri; 40：Crown Peak; 41：Baintha Brakk; 42：Yutmaru Sar; 43：K6; 44：Muztagh Tower; 45：Diran; 46：Apsarasas Kangri I; 47：Rimo III; 48：Gasherbrum V; Location in Xinjiang
- Location: Xinjiang, China
- Parent range: Yengisogat, Karakoram

Climbing
- First ascent: July 1993 by a Japanese team
- Easiest route: YDS Grade VI

The Crown
- Simplified Chinese: 皇冠山
Transcriptions

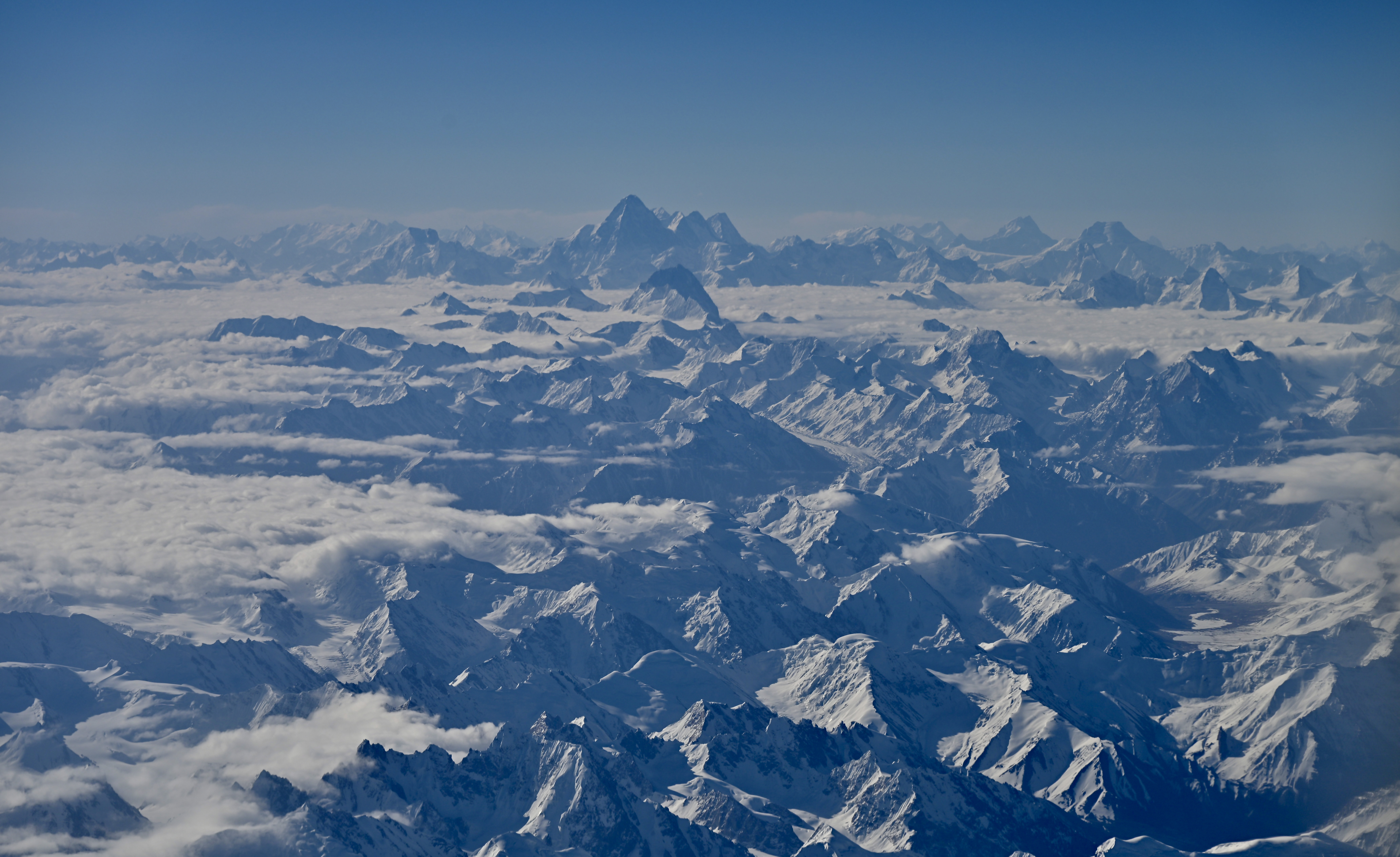

The Crown, also known as Huang Guan Shan and sometimes Crown Peak, is a mountain in the Karakoram mountain range in China. It is located in the Xinjiang Uyghur Autonomous Region of China. About 42 kilometers from Chogori Peak. Its summit has an elevation of 7,295 metres (23,934 ft) and it is the highest peak in the Yengisogat subrange of the Karakoram.

A detailed account of the unsuccessful British military summit attempt (1987), was written by Hugh McManners entitled "Crowning the Dragon", published by HarperCollins in 1989 ISBN 0586204253.

The summit was first climbed in 1993 by a Japanese expedition of the Tōkai branch of the Japanese Alpine Club. Three groups of climbers reached the summit on July 27, 28, and 29.

== See also ==
- List of highest mountains
- List of ultras of the Karakoram and Hindu Kush
