= Yukshin Gardan Sar =

Mountain in Pakistan

Yukshin Gardan Sar یکشن گردن سر
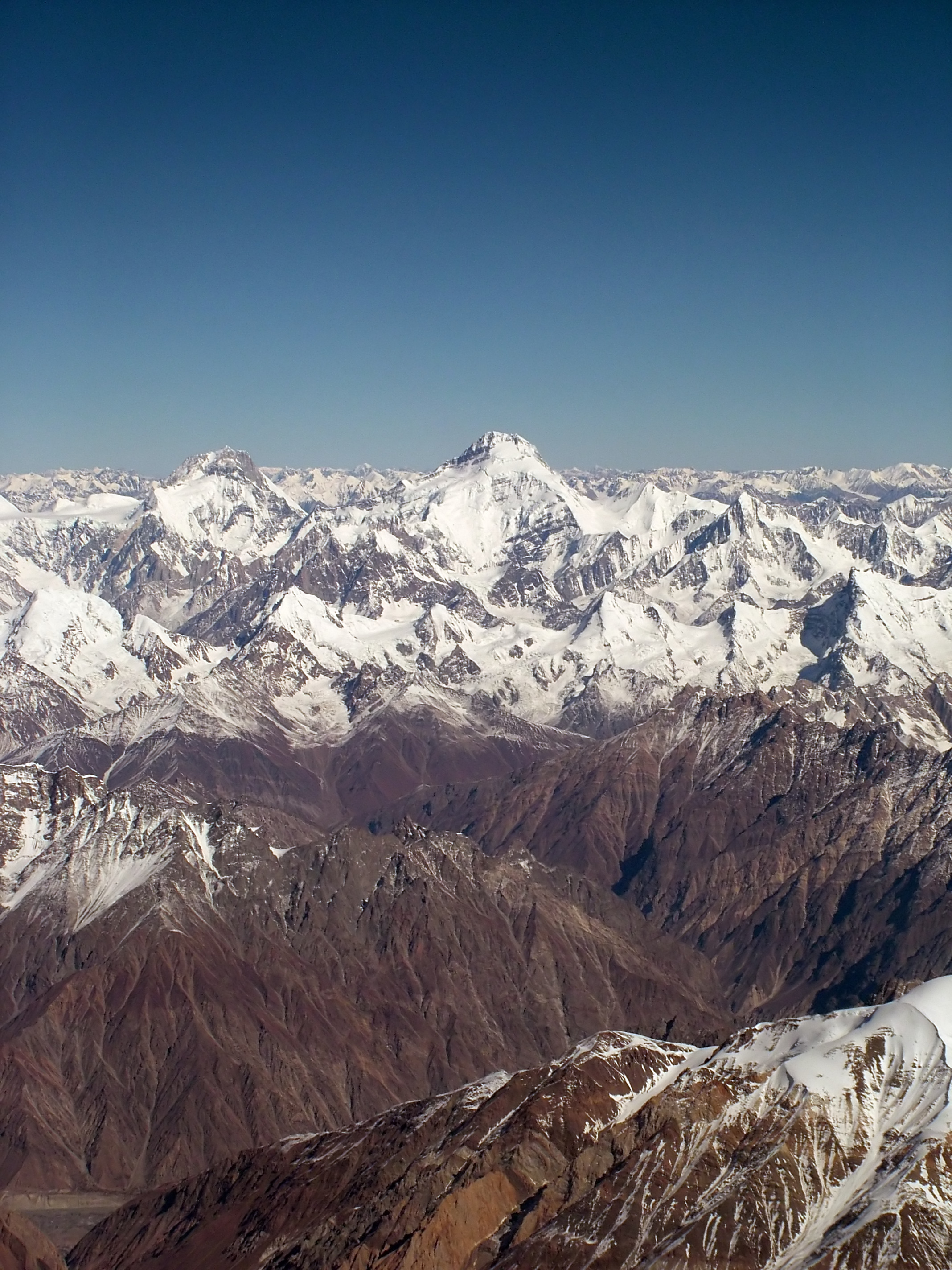
- Yukshin Gardan Sar (background left) and Kanjut Sar (background centre)

Highest point
- Elevation: 7,530 m (24,700 ft); Ranked 55th
- Prominence: 1,313 m (4,308 ft)
- Coordinates: 36°15′00″N 75°22′30″E

Geography
- Location within Pakistan Location within Gilgit Baltistan
- The major peaks in Karakoram are rank identified by height. Legend: 1：K2; 2：Gasherbrum I, K5; 3：Broad Peak; 4：Gasherbrum II, K4; 5：Gasherbrum III, K3a; 6：Gasherbrum IV, K3; 7：Distaghil Sar; 8：Kunyang Chhish; 9：Masherbrum, K1; 10：Batura Sar, Batura I; 11：Rakaposhi; 12：Batura II; 13：Kanjut Sar; 14：Saltoro Kangri, K10; 15：Batura III; 16： Saser Kangri I, K22; 17：Chogolisa; 18：Shispare; 19：Trivor Sar; 20：Skyang Kangri; 21：Mamostong Kangri, K35; 22：Saser Kangri II; 23：Saser Kangri III; 24：Pumari Chhish; 25：Passu Sar; 26：Yukshin Gardan Sar; 27：Teram Kangri I; 28：Malubiting; 29：K12; 30：Sia Kangri; 31：Momhil Sar; 32：Skil Brum; 33：Haramosh Peak; 34：Ghent Kangri; 35：Ultar Sar; 36：Rimo Massif; 37：Sherpi Kangri; 38：Yazghil Dome South; 39：Baltoro Kangri; 40：Crown Peak; 41：Baintha Brakk; 42：Yutmaru Sar; 43：K6; 44：Muztagh Tower; 45：Diran; 46：Apsarasas Kangri I; 47：Rimo III; 48：Gasherbrum V; Location in Gilgit-Baltistan
- Location: Gilgit–Baltistan, Pakistan
- Parent range: Hispar Muztagh, Karakoram

Climbing
- First ascent: June 26, 1984 by Willi Bauer, Walter Bergmayr, Willi Brandecker, Reinhard Streif (Austrian)
- Easiest route: South Ridge: glacier/snow/ice climb

Yukshin Gardan Sar
- Simplified Chinese: 雅克辛嘎丹峰
Transcriptions

Yukshin Gardan Sar (Urdu: یکشن گردن سر) is a high peak in the Shimshal Valley, in the Karakoram range in Gilgit-Baltistan, Pakistan. Its height is often given as 7,469 m (24,505 ft) or 7,641 m (25,069 ft). It lies about 16 km (10 mi) northeast of Khunyang Chhish and 6 km (3.75 mi) northwest of Kanjut Sar. It is flanked on the northwest by the Yazghil Glacier and on the northeast by the Yukshin Gardan Glacier; both drain into the Shimshal River. According to many residents of Shimshal, Yukshin Gardan Sar is the name of the adjacent peak Kanjut Sar, and vice versa. In Shimshal village, the original namings are widely accepted and used, as opposed to what is recognised internationally.

Yukshin Gardan Sar was first climbed on June 26, 1984, by a Pakistani-Austrian group, led by Rudolf Wurzer. They ascended via the South Ridge, which they accessed via the Yazghil Glacier on the west side of the peak.

The second ascent followed very shortly after the first, on July 23, 1984. A Pakistani-Japanese group that had been on the mountain simultaneously with the first ascent party switched from their unworkable North Ridge route to make an alpine style ascent of the first ascent route on the South Ridge.

The third ascent of the peak was in 1986, by a Spanish team comprising Alejandro Arranz, Iñaki Aldaya, Alfredo Zabalza, and Tomás Miguel. They used the same route as the first-ascent party. According to the Himalayan Index, there have been no other ascents or attempts on this peak since that time.

== Notes ==
1. This prominence figure is approximate.
