= Sherpi Kangri =

Mountain peak in the Karakoram range

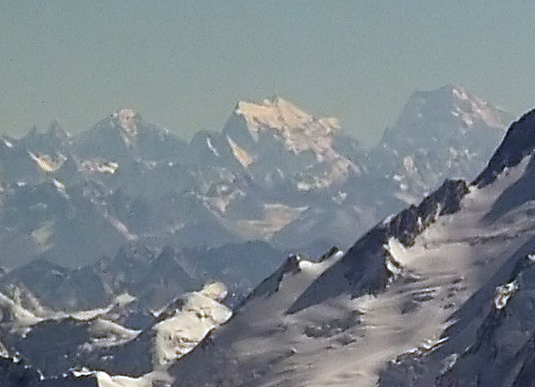

Highest point
- Elevation: 7,380 m (24,210 ft); Ranked 74th
- Prominence: 1,000 m (3,300 ft)
- Coordinates: 35°27′59″N 76°46′55″E

Geography
- Location within Karakoram Location within Gilgit Baltistan Location within Pakistan
- The major peaks in Karakoram are rank identified by height. Legend: 1：K2; 2：Gasherbrum I, K5; 3：Broad Peak; 4：Gasherbrum II, K4; 5：Gasherbrum III, K3a; 6：Gasherbrum IV, K3; 7：Distaghil Sar; 8：Kunyang Chhish; 9：Masherbrum, K1; 10：Batura Sar, Batura I; 11：Rakaposhi; 12：Batura II; 13：Kanjut Sar; 14：Saltoro Kangri, K10; 15：Batura III; 16： Saser Kangri I, K22; 17：Chogolisa; 18：Shispare; 19：Trivor Sar; 20：Skyang Kangri; 21：Mamostong Kangri, K35; 22：Saser Kangri II; 23：Saser Kangri III; 24：Pumari Chhish; 25：Passu Sar; 26：Yukshin Gardan Sar; 27：Teram Kangri I; 28：Malubiting; 29：K12; 30：Sia Kangri; 31：Momhil Sar; 32：Skil Brum; 33：Haramosh Peak; 34：Ghent Kangri; 35：Ultar Sar; 36：Rimo Massif; 37：Sherpi Kangri; 38：Yazghil Dome South; 39：Baltoro Kangri; 40：Crown Peak; 41：Baintha Brakk; 42：Yutmaru Sar; 43：K6; 44：Muztagh Tower; 45：Diran; 46：Apsarasas Kangri I; 47：Rimo III; 48：Gasherbrum V; Location in Gilgit-Baltistan
- Location: Saltoro Ridge, Pakistan
- Parent range: Karakoram

Climbing
- First ascent: 10 August 1976

Sherpi Kangri
- Simplified Chinese: 舍披崗日峰
Transcriptions

Sherpi Kangri is a mountain peak in the Karakoram Range. It lies six km south of Ghent Kangri (7,380 m) and ten km northwest of Saltoro Kangri (7,742 m).

Sherpi Kangri I is the higher, western summit at 7380 m. Sherpi Kangri II at approximately 7100 m is further east.

== See also ==
- List of mountains in Pakistan
- Gilgit–Baltistan
- List of mountains in India
- Ladakh
