= Diran =

Mountain in Karakoram range, Pakistan

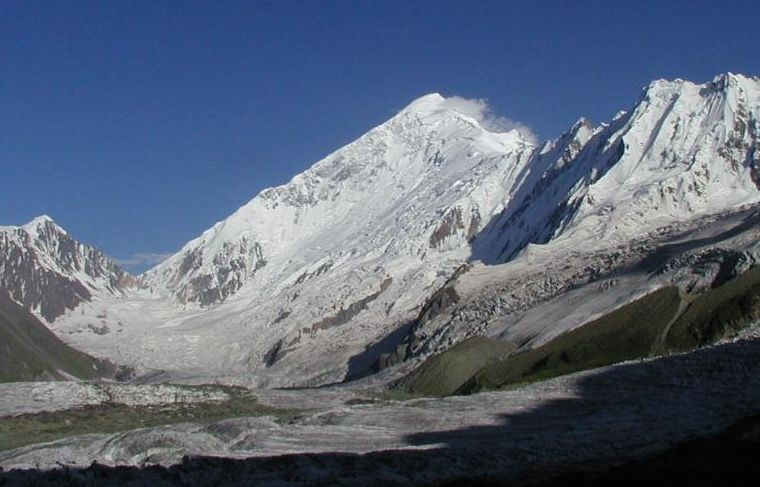
- Diran Peak from Rakaposhi Base Camp

Highest point
- Elevation: 7,266 m (23,839 ft); Ranked 93rd
- Prominence: 1,325 m (4,347 ft)
- Listing: Mountains of Pakistan
- Coordinates: 36°07′N 74°40′E

Naming
- Native name: دیرن (Urdu)

Geography
- Location within Pakistan Location within Gilgit Baltistan
- The major peaks in Karakoram are rank identified by height. Legend: 1：K2; 2：Gasherbrum I, K5; 3：Broad Peak; 4：Gasherbrum II, K4; 5：Gasherbrum III, K3a; 6：Gasherbrum IV, K3; 7：Distaghil Sar; 8：Kunyang Chhish; 9：Masherbrum, K1; 10：Batura Sar, Batura I; 11：Rakaposhi; 12：Batura II; 13：Kanjut Sar; 14：Saltoro Kangri, K10; 15：Batura III; 16： Saser Kangri I, K22; 17：Chogolisa; 18：Shispare; 19：Trivor Sar; 20：Skyang Kangri; 21：Mamostong Kangri, K35; 22：Saser Kangri II; 23：Saser Kangri III; 24：Pumari Chhish; 25：Passu Sar; 26：Yukshin Gardan Sar; 27：Teram Kangri I; 28：Malubiting; 29：K12; 30：Sia Kangri; 31：Momhil Sar; 32：Skil Brum; 33：Haramosh Peak; 34：Ghent Kangri; 35：Ultar Sar; 36：Rimo Massif; 37：Sherpi Kangri; 38：Yazghil Dome South; 39：Baltoro Kangri; 40：Crown Peak; 41：Baintha Brakk; 42：Yutmaru Sar; 43：K6; 44：Muztagh Tower; 45：Diran; 46：Apsarasas Kangri I; 47：Rimo III; 48：Gasherbrum V; Location in Gilgit-Baltistan
- Location: Gilgit-Baltistan, Pakistan
- Parent range: Karakoram

Climbing
- First ascent: 1968 by Rainer Goschl, Rudolph Pischinger and Hanns Schell
- Easiest route: Rock/snow/ice climb

Diran (Urdu: دیرن) is a mountain in the Karakoram range in Bagrot Valley, Gilgit-Baltistan, Pakistan. This 7,266-metre (23,839 ft), pyramid-shaped mountain lies to the east of Rakaposhi (7,788m).

The first ascent of Diran was in 1968, in alpine-style climbing by three Austrian mountaineers: Rainer Goeschl, Rudolph Pischinger and Hanns Schell. Earlier attempts by a British expedition in 1958, a German expedition in 1959, and an Austrian expedition in 1964 had been unsuccessful, driven back by bad weather, deep snow and avalanches.

== See also ==
- List of mountains by elevation
