= Shimshal =

Village in northern Pakistan

Shimshal شمشال Shingshal
- Village
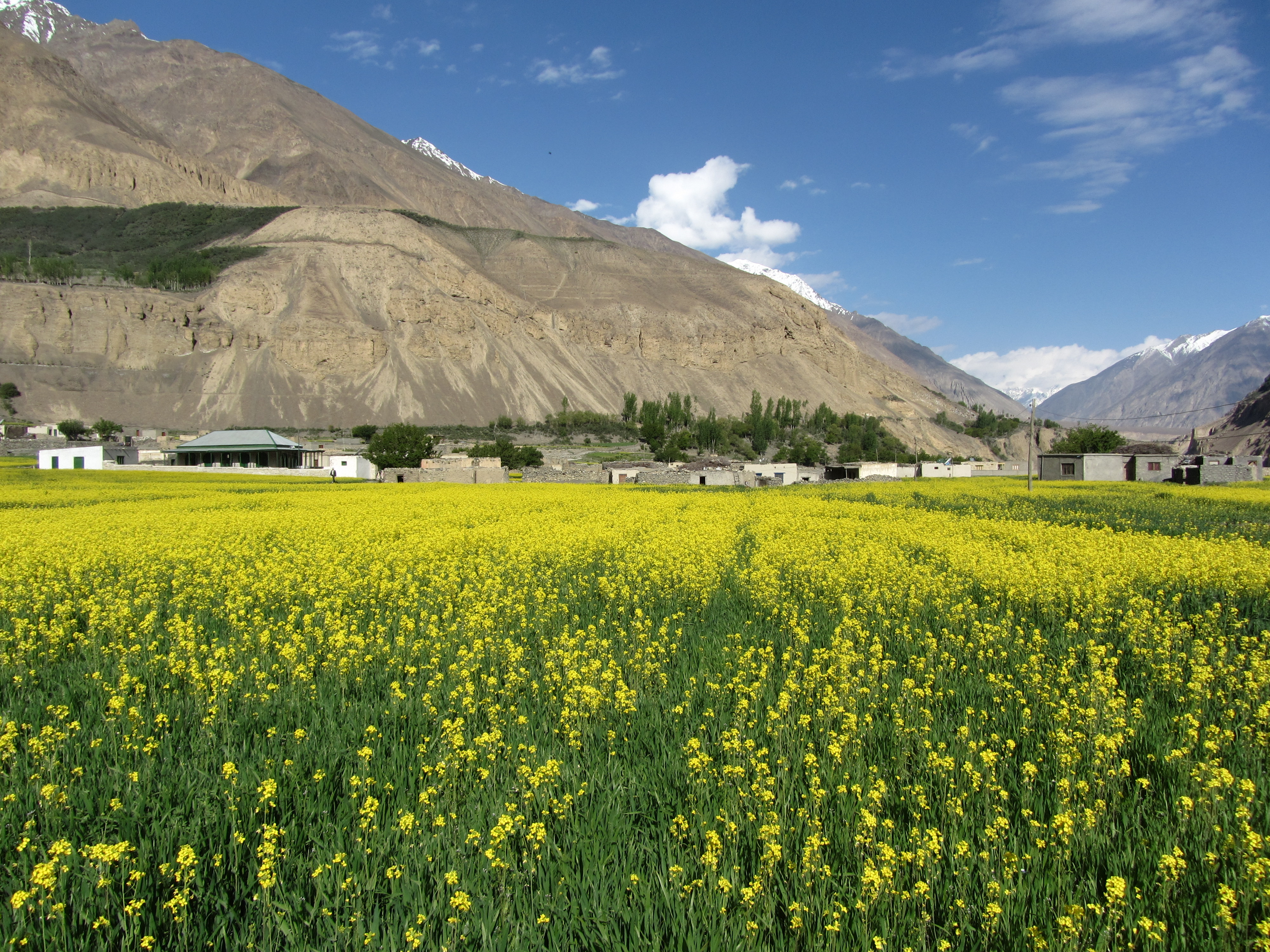
- Shimshal in the spring

- Location within Gilgit Baltistan Location within Pakistan
- Coordinates: 36.4366°N 75.3260°E
- Country: Pakistan
- Autonomous territory: Gilgit Baltistan
- District: Hunza
- subdivision: Gojal
- Elevation: 3,100 m (10,200 ft)

Population
- More than 2,000
- Time zone: PST
  - Summer (DST): GMT+5:00

Shimshal (Urdu: شمشال), previously known as Shingshal, is a village located in the Gojal tehsil of the Hunza District in the Gilgit–Baltistan region of northern Pakistan. It is located on the Karakoram range bordering the Pamir Mountains to the north. It lies at an altitude of 3,113 metres (10,213 ft) above sea level and is the highest settlement in the district. Shimshal is also the name of the largest valley in Gilgit-Baltistan. The valley encompasses nearly the entire district of Hunza. Situated within the valley is the Shimshal River, a tributary that feeds into the Hunza River. Shimshal itself is a border village, serving as a linkage point between Pakistan's Gilgit-Baltistan region and China.

== History ==
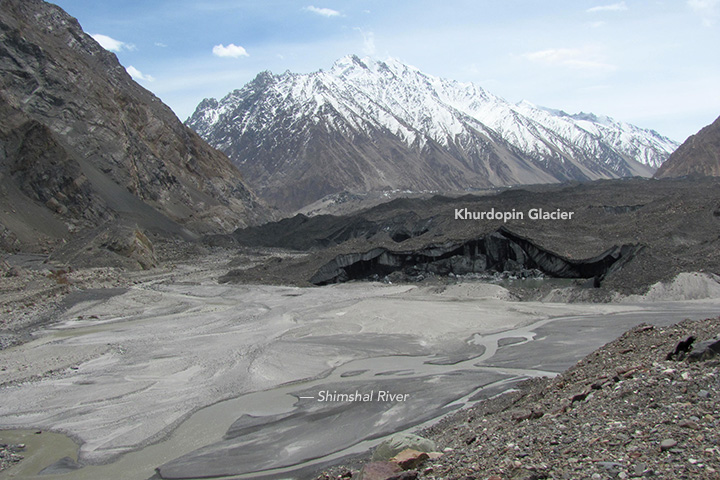
Khurdopin glacier and Shimshal River, 2017. Several glaciers flow into the Shimshal Valley, and are prone to blocking the river. Khurdopin glacier surged in 2016–17, creating a sizable lake.

The village of Shimshal was founded in 1450 by Mamu Singh, the brother of "Chu Singh". Both were Burushaski peakers and they belonged to the "Brong Family". Mamu Singh was fond of hunting and other mountain sports. One day, in search of ibex, he went to Gojal. During his hunting trip, he fell in love with a beautiful girl who he then married. They started to live in the area of Boiber. Once, he climbed up to the summit of Karun Kuh which provided him a chance to view the entire region and to see the grazing ground of Lup Goz, which they traveled to with a flock of sheep and goats.

Later, he climbed on the high ground running east, and saw the vast area of "Shimshal Valley" (Shingshal). He noticed that there were signs of existence of a water channel. He came to the conclusion that this flat barren land had been cultivated some time in the past. Thus, Mamu Singh decided to cultivate the abandoned land. He repaired the broken water channel and got water running through it for irrigation. After cultivations in the new settlement Mamu Singh decided to relocate from Astan to Shimshal along with his wife and herds.. They had a son who went on to produce further descendants, populating the area.

=== Pakistan ===
The Pakistan Army came to Shimshal in the late 1960s and was posted in Pamir because of border disputes with China. Many Shimshalis worked as porters for the army. Today, many Shimshalis work as porters for trekking and mountaineering groups and expeditions.

== Geography ==
The village was inaccessible by motor roads until October 2003, when a new road from the Karakoram Highway at Passu was constructed. It is 56 km to reach the Shimshal Valley from Passu. Self-help or Nomus (in local Wakhi language) is the major driver for infrastructure development in Shimshal. Shimshal is the largest valley of the Hunza District of Gilgit-Baltistan. Its extensive pasture lands include Shimshal Pamir, Gujerav, Yazghail and Loopghar.

=== Shimshal Pass ===
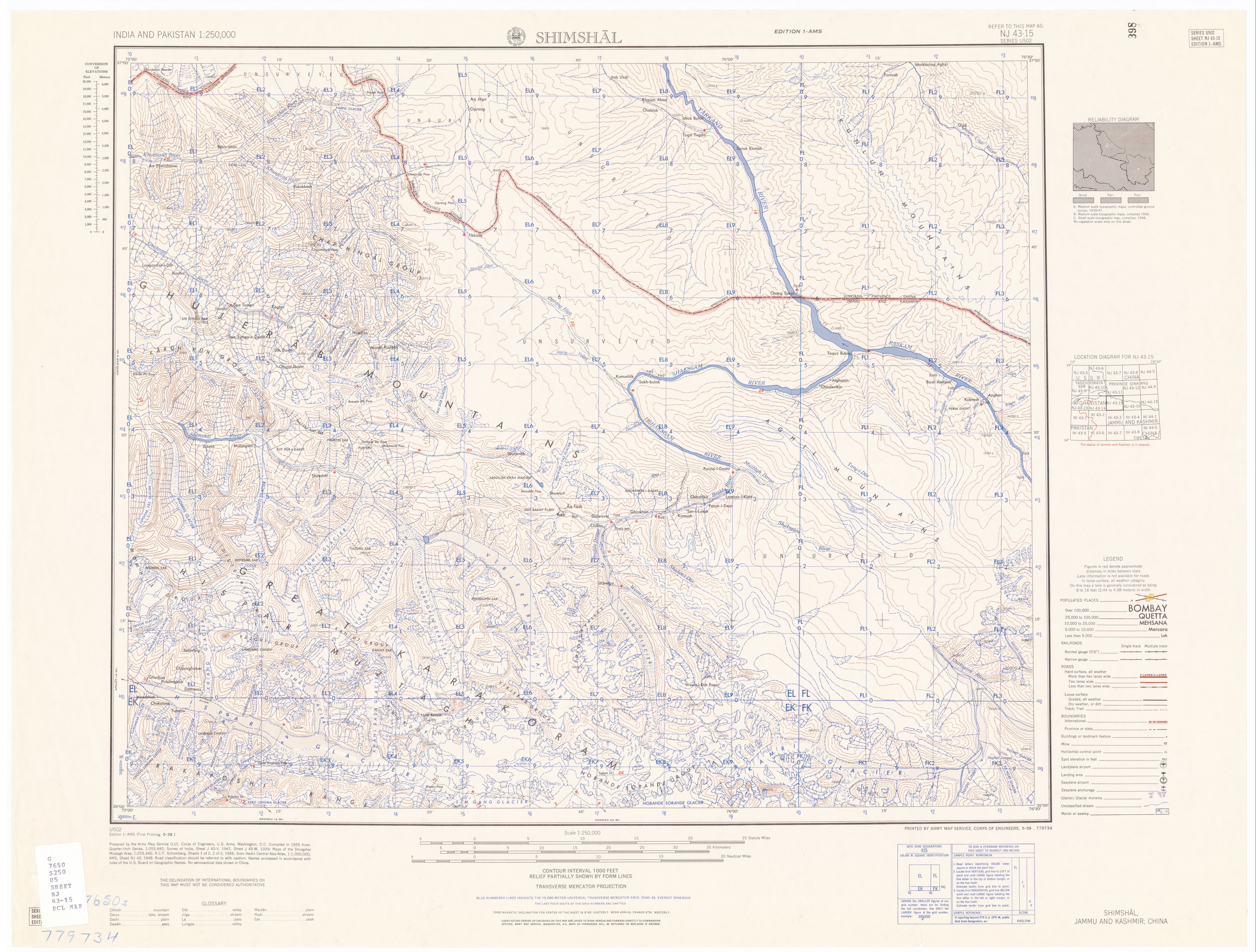
Map including Shimshāl (AMS, 1955)

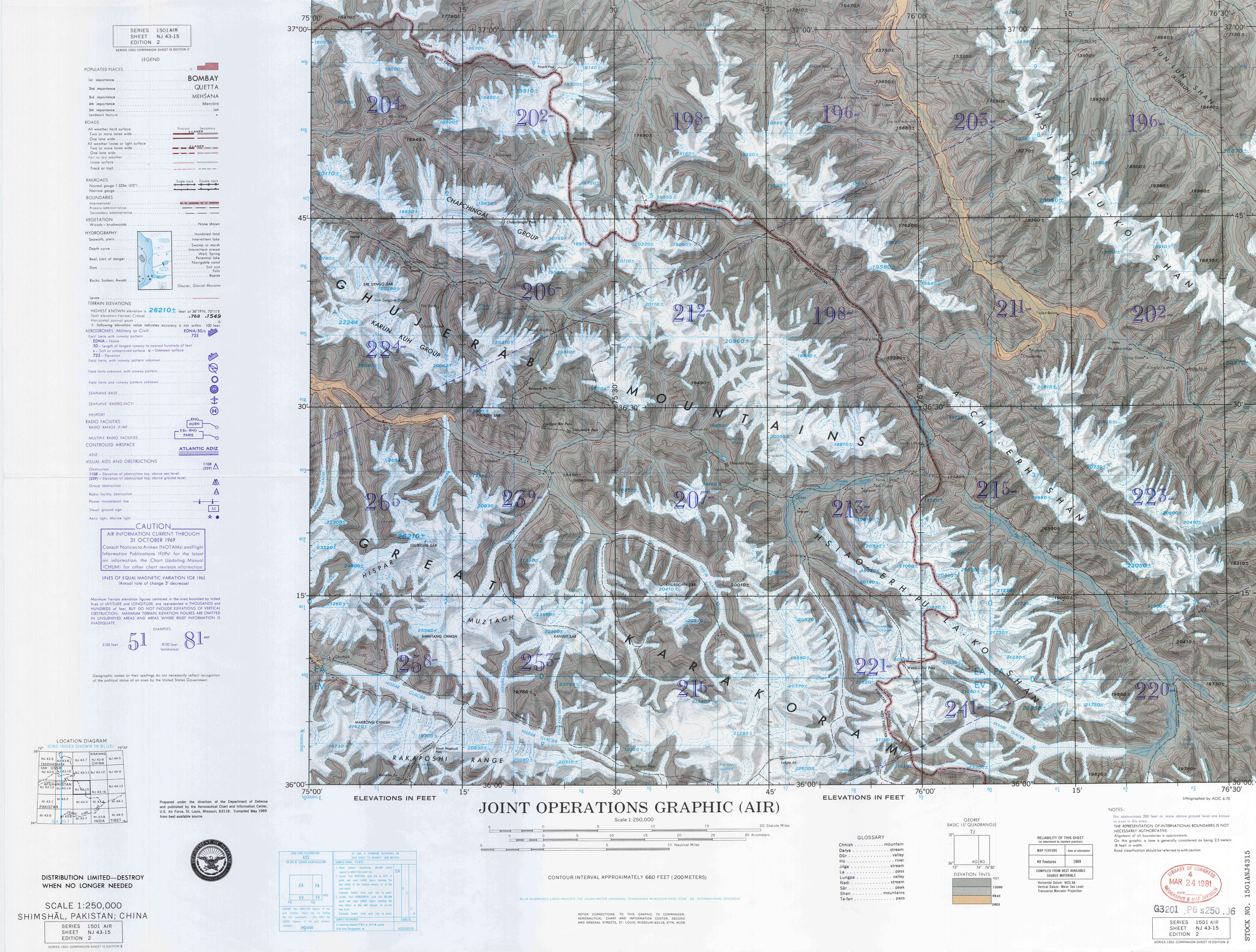
Map including Shimshāl (ACIC, 1969)

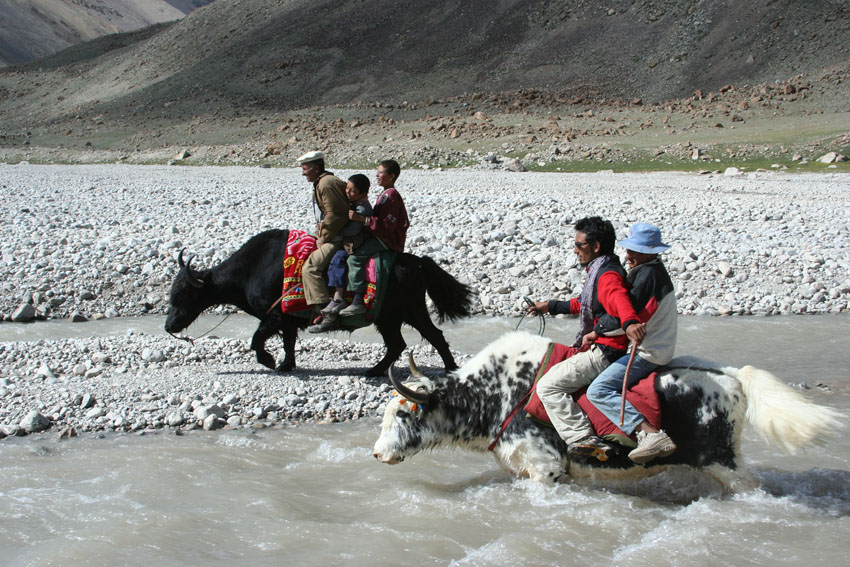
Yak racing

Shimshal Pass (4,735 m [15,535 ft]) 36°26′0″N 75°41′15″E rises above the village. It lies on the watershed between the Indus River and Tarim River basins, and leads to the valley of the Shimshal Braldu River, a tributary of the Shaksgam River on the border with China. Francis Younghusband was likely the first Englishman to reach the pass (1889). At the time it was used by raiders from Hunza to attack caravans traveling between Leh and Yarkand.

The pass is not part of Khunjerab National Park, but the Shimshal community has set up an organization called SNT (Shimshal Nature Trust) which oversees the entire region and takes care of its own land. It is a community-based organization and is registered with the Government of Pakistan. Annually, in the last week of July or the first week of August, there is a festival at Shimshal Pass where locals partake in a yak race, followed by singing and dancing. In Wakhi language it is called Woolyo. This yak race is the only one of its kind, and is a unique event organised at high mountain settlements of Pakistan.

== Demographics ==
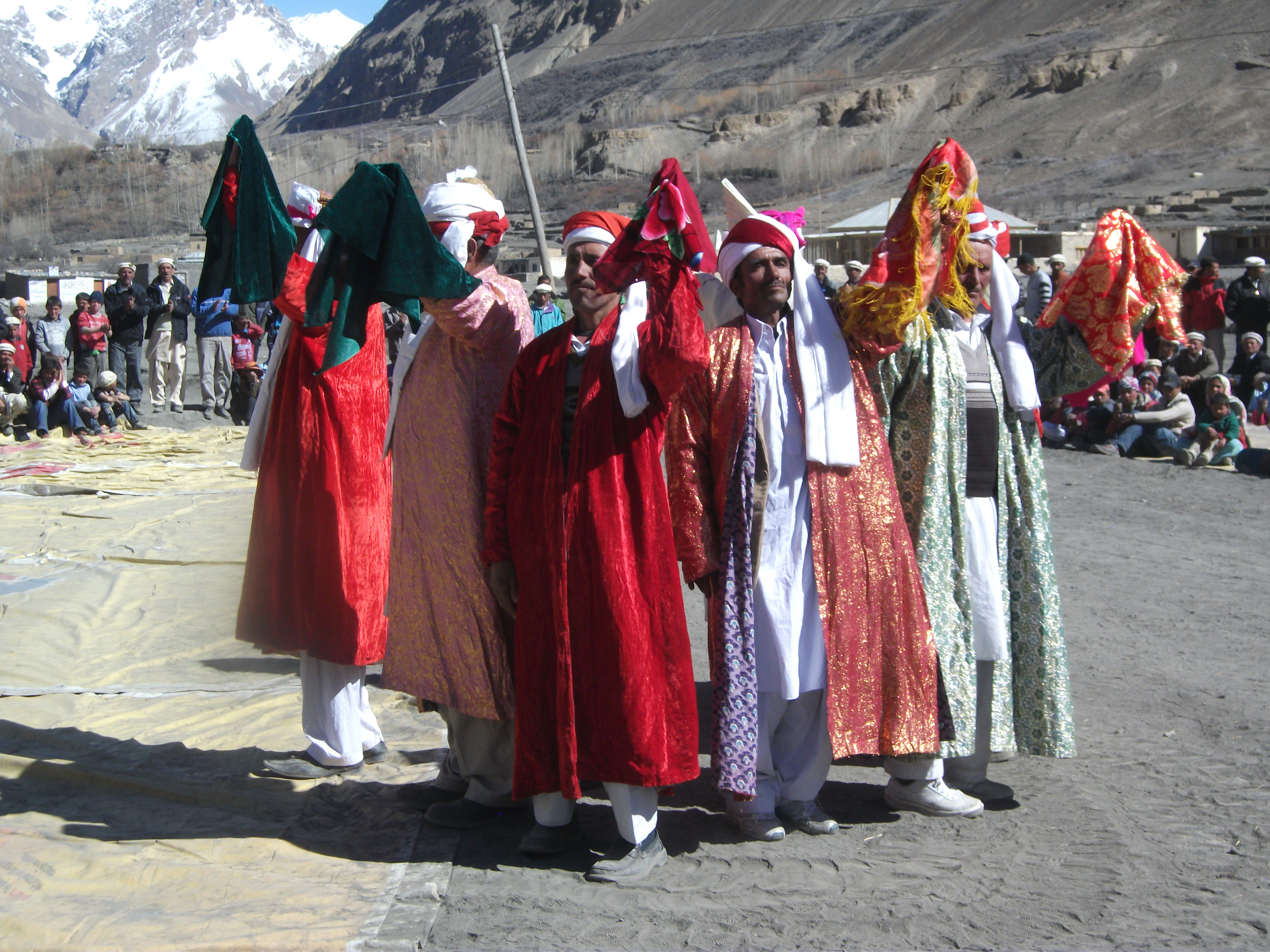
Silk Route caravan of Shimshal

The people of Shimshal are Wakhi and they speak the Wakhi language. They belong to the Ismaili sect of Shia Islam. The community follows Aga Khan, a spiritual leader. The total area of Shimshal is estimated at approximately 3,800 km^{2} (1,500 sq mi) and there are around three thousand inhabitants with a total of 450 households, and almost every house uses solar panels to generate electricity.

=== Settlements ===
Shimshal comprises four major hamlets: Farmanabad, Aminabad, Center Shimshal, and Khizarabad. Shimshalis use numerous seasonal mountain grasslands, located several days walk from the village, to sustain herds of yaks, goats, and sheep.

Shimshal has produced several well-known mountaineers for Pakistan. Among those, Samina Baig is the first woman climber from Pakistan to scale Mt. Everest and all highest peaks in seven continents around the globe. Rajab Shah has the honor of scaling all five highest peaks in Pakistan. Both Rajab Shah and Mehrban Shah have received a Presidential Award for Pride of Performance in the field of mountaineering. Some people call Shimshal The Valley of Mountaineers in Pakistan.

The Lok Versa Museum of Shimshal has antiques, artifacts, musical instruments, and daily life items made from wood, showcasing the history of its local community. Two books by Pam Henson about Shimshal, "Shimshal" and "Women of Shimshal," have been published by the Shimshal Trust. Henson, a teacher from New Zealand, wrote the books based on her experiences teaching and living in Shimshal.

The Shimshal River comes from this area and then transforms the shape of Hunza River, which joins the Indus River below the region's capital city Gilgit. Shimshal River is formed from three sources: Khurdopin Glacier, Shimshal Pass and Zardgorban. The Shimshal River flows into the Khunjrab River and then the Passu River before ending in Attabad Lake.

== Economy ==
Shimshal obtains hydroelectricity from the Odver stream, particularly during the warmer months of the year which typically span from June to October. The absence of electricity for seven months poses a significant challenge for the local community in Shimshal. During this prolonged period, residents have had to resort to various alternatives such as kerosene oil, firewood, solar panels, and compressed natural gas in cylinders to meet their energy needs However, a small hydro electricity power station of 0.2 MW is under construction at Kuk area of Shimshal that is scheduled to be complete in 2017.

On 14 December 2016, Shimshal connected with the rest of the world through a cellular network of the Special Communications Organization known as SCOM. SCOM provides GSM services in Azad Jammu and Kashmir and Gilgit-Baltistan, and its GSM service is connected with the solar power grid in Shimshal. Samina Baig, who is Brand Ambassador of SCOM, played a vital role in providing cellular service to the people of Shimshal.

Naubahar School in Shimshal produces 20 KV electricity using solar panels. This is enough to meet the electricity needs of 18 classrooms and an IT lab.

=== Shimshal Nature Trust ===
Shimshal Nature Trust is a community-based development organization. In January 2008, The Science and Practice of Ecology & Society Award (SPES) was granted to Shimshal Nature Trust by the Resilience Alliance.

=== Nomus (self-help village development programme) ===
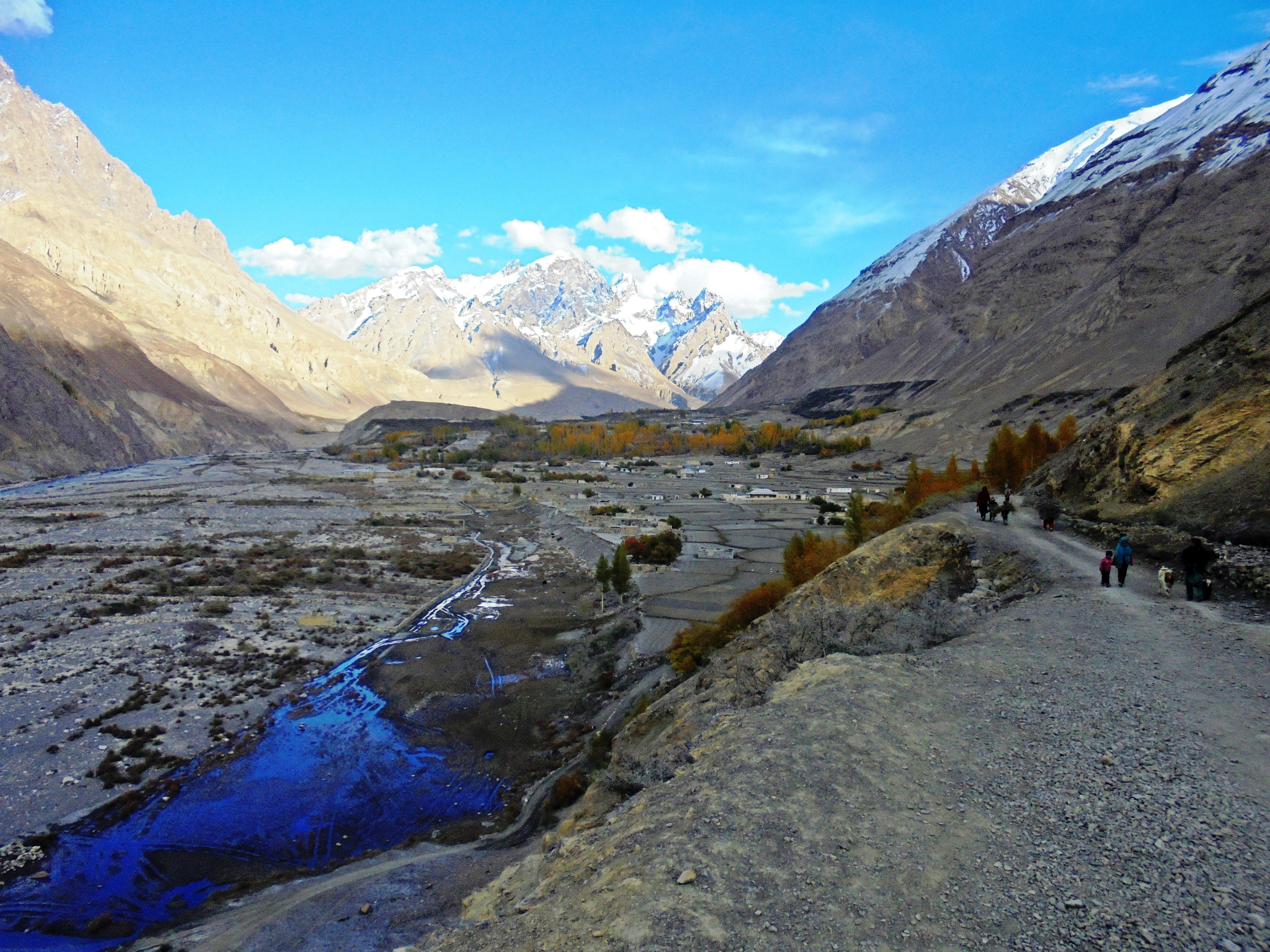
Vibrant Colours of Autumn in Shimshal, Hunza Pakistan

Nomus is a Wakhi word commonly known in Shimshal valley. It is a unique social philanthropic (showing concern for humanity) system of the local community. Details are available here Nomus and Oral testimonies from Shimshal. It is one of its kind model of participatory community development in Gilgit-Baltistan area of Pakistan.

== Tourism ==
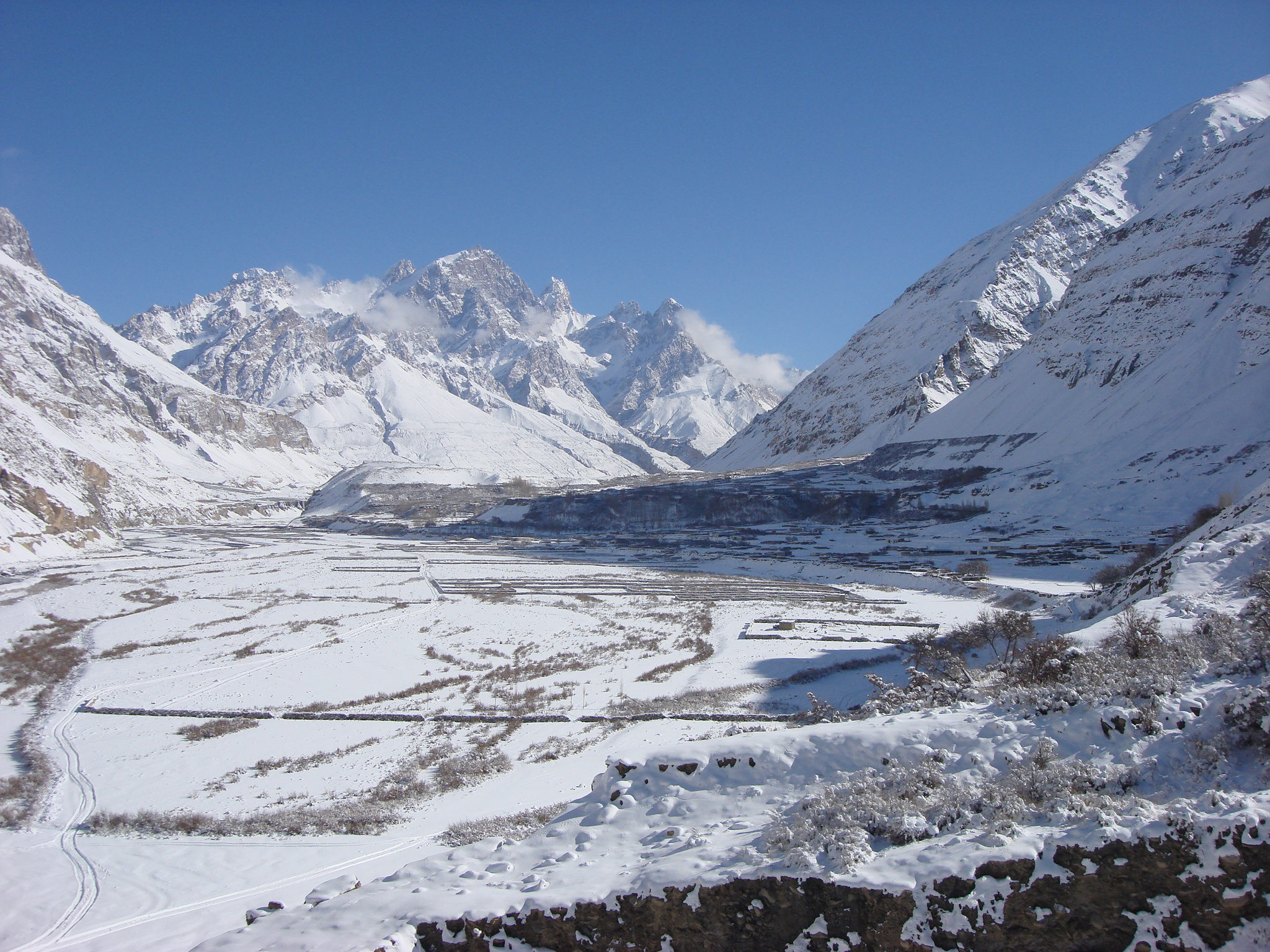
Shimshal in Winter

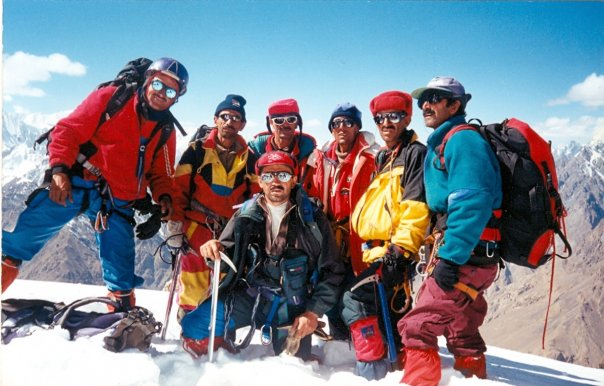
Shimshali mountaineers

Shimshal Valley has its largest adventure area in Hunza and is a major attraction for tourists. Its well-known mountains include:

- Distaghil Sar (7,885 m [25,869 ft])
- Kunjut Sar (7,790 m [25,560 ft])
- Trivor (7,577 m [24,859 ft])
- Pumari Chhish (W) (7,492 m [24,580 ft])
- Yukshin Gardan Sar (7,530 m [24,700 ft])
- Momhil Sar (7,343 m [24,091 ft])
- Malungutti Sar (7,207 m [23,645 ft])
- Shimshal Whitehorn (6,303 m [20,679 ft])
- Minglik Sar (6,150 m [20,180 ft])
- Lupghar Sar (7,200 m [23,600 ft])
- Dut Sar (6,858 m [22,500 ft])
- Sonia Peak (6,310 m [20,700 ft])
- Purian Sar (6,293 m [20,646 ft])
- Yazghail Sar (6,000 m [20,000 ft])
- Yawash Sar II (6,176 m [20,262 ft])

Gigantic glaciers include Malangudhi, Yazghail, Khurdopin (5,800 m [19,000 ft]), Braldu, Odver, and Ver Zharav. The main passes include Chafchingoal, Khurdopin, Mai Dur, Braldu, and Boi Sam. Among these, the Khurdopin glacier pass remains a favorite destination for trekkers.

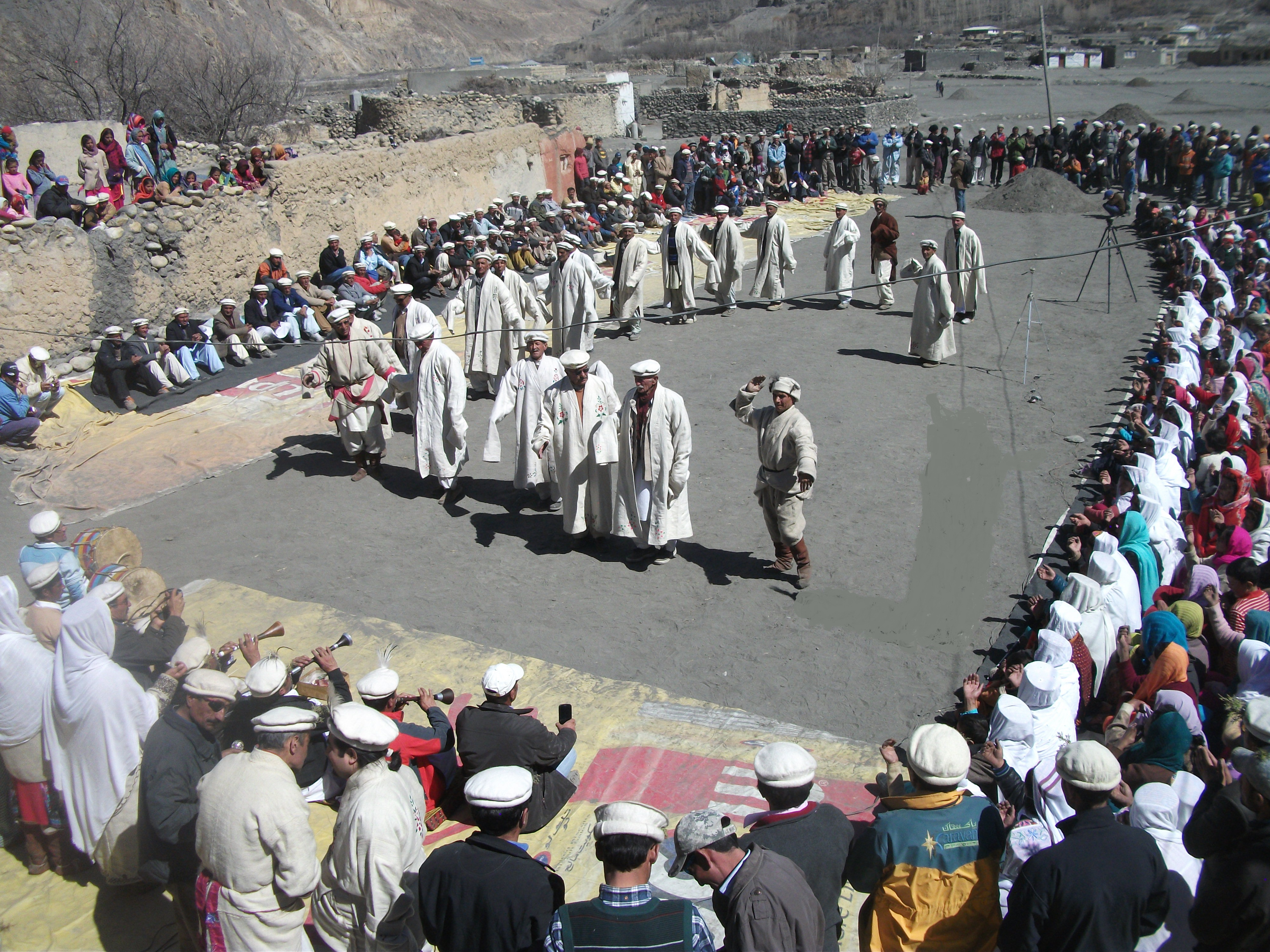
Traditional dance of Shimshal

== Notable people ==
- Samina Baig, hailing from Shimshal valley, is the first Pakistani woman to scale the world's highest mountain, Mt. Everest. She also has the honor of scaling all highest peaks in seven continents.
- Mirza Ali Baig hailing from Shimshal is also a mountaineer. In addition, he is a photographer and social worker. He is the brother of Samina Baig, and trained here climbing on mountains and mountaineering.
- Abdul Joshi, born in Shimshal, is the first Pakistani to summit Annapurna, the tenth highest peak in the world. He is also the eighth Pakistani to summit Mount Everest.
