= Apsarasas Kangri =

Mountain in Central Asia

- Location within Karakoram Location within Southern Xinjiang Location within Ladakh
- The major peaks in Karakoram are rank identified by height. Legend: 1：K2; 2：Gasherbrum I, K5; 3：Broad Peak; 4：Gasherbrum II, K4; 5：Gasherbrum III, K3a; 6：Gasherbrum IV, K3; 7：Distaghil Sar; 8：Kunyang Chhish; 9：Masherbrum, K1; 10：Batura Sar, Batura I; 11：Rakaposhi; 12：Batura II; 13：Kanjut Sar; 14：Saltoro Kangri, K10; 15：Batura III; 16： Saser Kangri I, K22; 17：Chogolisa; 18：Shispare; 19：Trivor Sar; 20：Skyang Kangri; 21：Mamostong Kangri, K35; 22：Saser Kangri II; 23：Saser Kangri III; 24：Pumari Chhish; 25：Passu Sar; 26：Yukshin Gardan Sar; 27：Teram Kangri I; 28：Malubiting; 29：K12; 30：Sia Kangri; 31：Momhil Sar; 32：Skil Brum; 33：Haramosh Peak; 34：Ghent Kangri; 35：Ultar Sar; 36：Rimo Massif; 37：Sherpi Kangri; 38：Yazghil Dome South; 39：Baltoro Kangri; 40：Crown Peak; 41：Baintha Brakk; 42：Yutmaru Sar; 43：K6; 44：Muztagh Tower; 45：Diran; 46：Apsarasas Kangri I; 47：Rimo III; 48：Gasherbrum V

Highest point
- Elevation: 7,245 m (23,770 ft); Ranked 95th
- Prominence: 625 m (2,051 ft)
- Parent peak: Teram Kangri
- Coordinates: 35°32′20″N 77°08′57″E

Geography
- Location: Ladakh, India, Xinjiang, China
- Parent range: Siachen Muztagh, Karakoram

Climbing
- First ascent: 1976
- Easiest route: snow/ice climb

Apsarasas Kangri
- Simplified Chinese: Apsarasas崗日峰
Transcriptions

Apsarasas Kangri is a mountain in the Siachen subrange of the Karakoram mountain range. With an elevation of 7,245 m (23,770 ft), it is the 95th highest mountain in the world. Apsarasas Kangri is located within the broader Kashmir region disputed between India, Pakistan and China. It is situated on the border between the areas controlled by China as part of the Xinjiang autonomous region, and the Siachen Glacier controlled by India as part of Ladakh.

View from space of Apsarasas Kangri
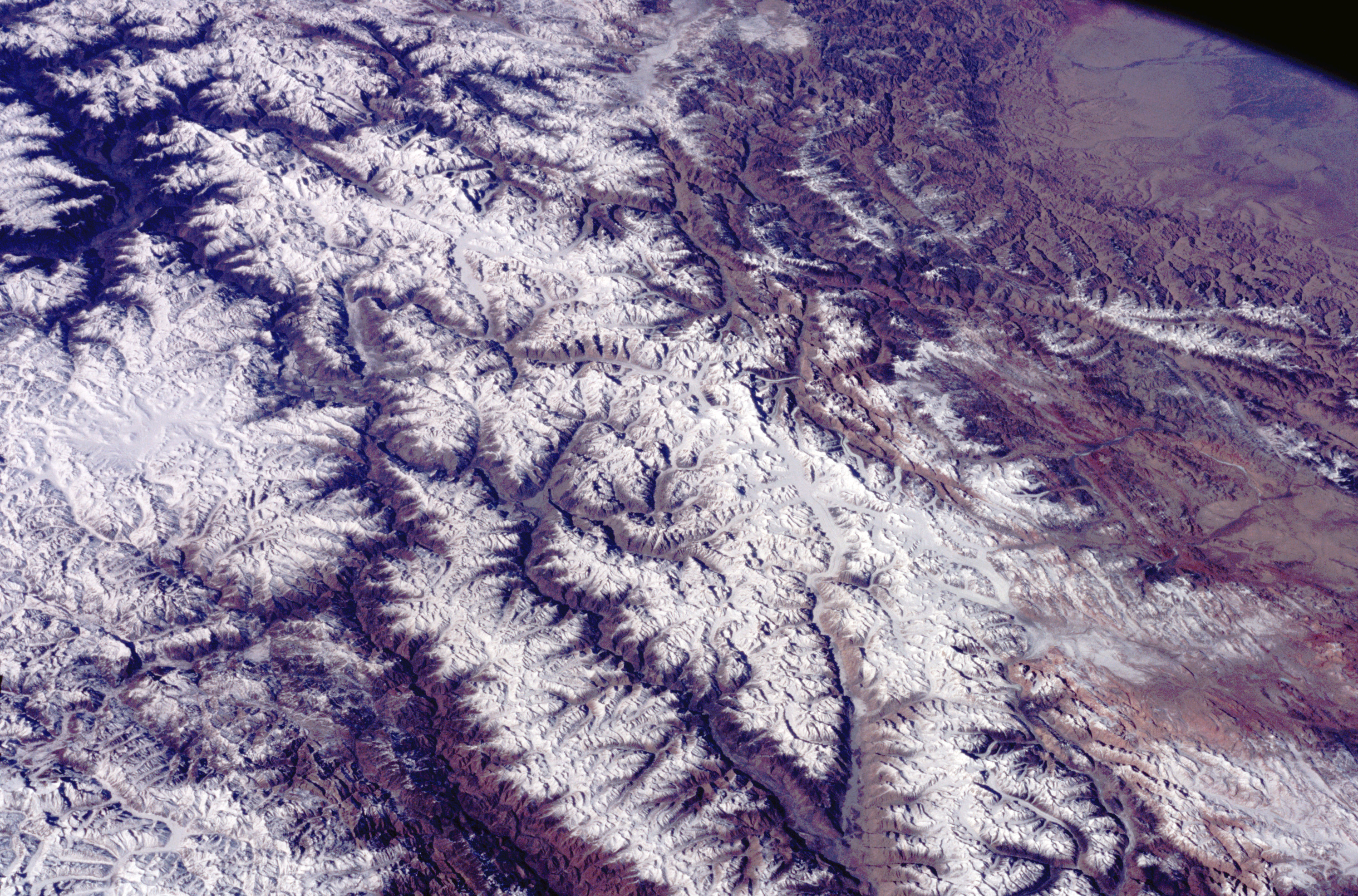

== Geography ==
Apsarasas was named by Grant Peterkin of the 1908 Workman expedition, from apsara ("fairies") and sas ("place"), thus "place of the fairies". There are at least three main summits of near-equal height, usually labeled I to III from west to east over a distance of 5 km (3.1 mi). The eastern summit (35°31′14″N 77°11′56″E) is separated from the other two by a saddle just over 6800 m high.

Only the western peak (Apsarasas I) appears to have been climbed. The first ascent was made over the west ridge by Yoshio Inagaki, Katsuhisa Yabuta and Takamasa Miyomoto of the Osaka University Mountaineering Club on August 7, 1976. The second ascent was by an Indian Army expedition on September 18, 1980, and another Indian army team achieved the third ascent in 1988. Apsarasas II and Apsarasas III are listed as "virgin peaks" by the Indian Mountaineering Foundation, and the eastern summit counts amongst the highest unclimbed peaks.
