= Saser Kangri =

Mountain in India

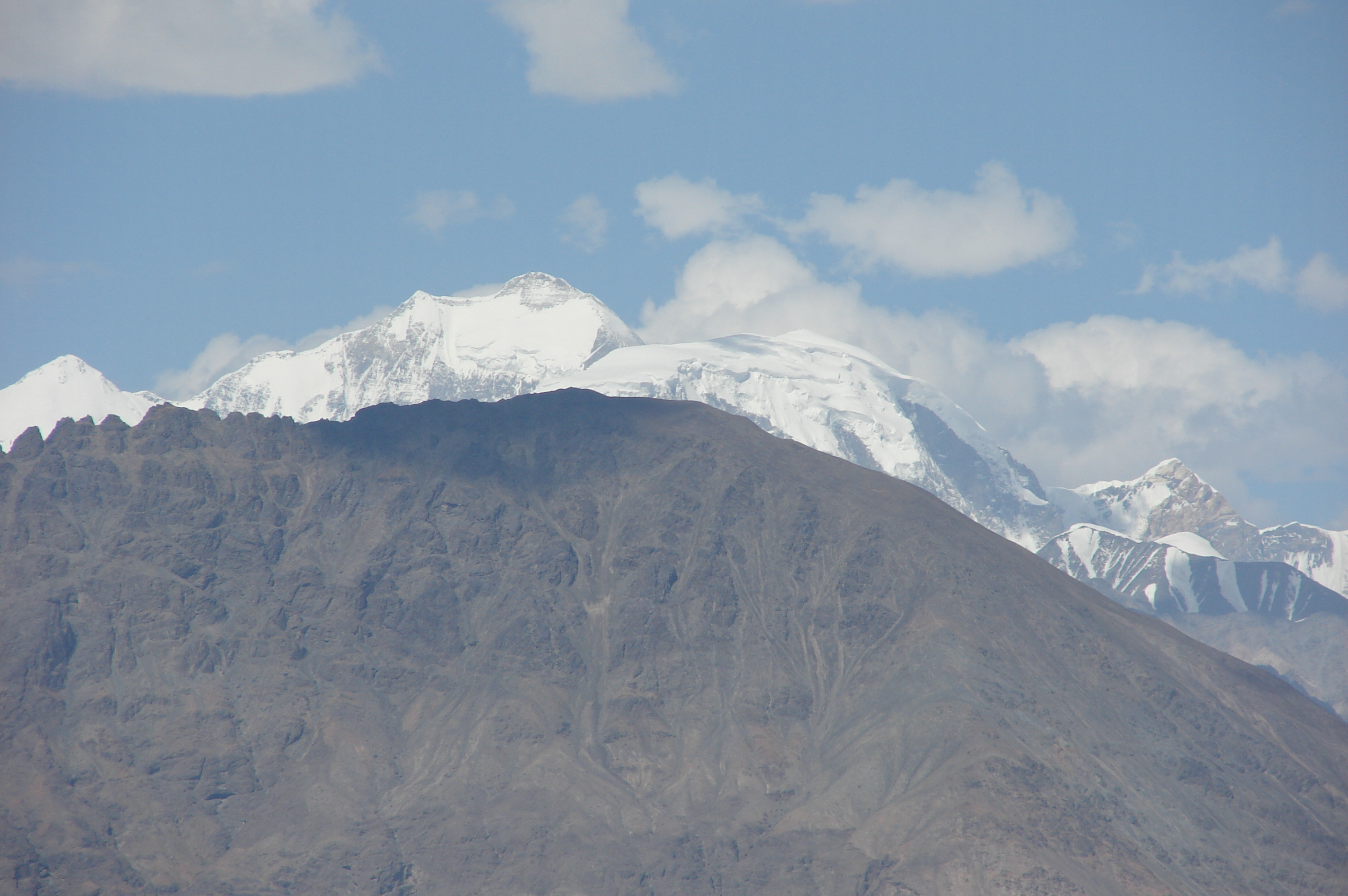
- Saser Kangri I

Highest point
- Elevation: 7,672 m (25,171 ft); Ranked 35th
- Prominence: 2,304 m (7,559 ft)
- Listing: Ultra
- Coordinates: 34°51′54″N 77°45′09″E

Naming
- English translation: Yellow Snow Mountain
- Language of name: Ladakhi

Geography
- Location within Ladakh Location within India
- The major peaks in Karakoram are rank identified by height. Legend: 1：K2; 2：Gasherbrum I, K5; 3：Broad Peak; 4：Gasherbrum II, K4; 5：Gasherbrum III, K3a; 6：Gasherbrum IV, K3; 7：Distaghil Sar; 8：Kunyang Chhish; 9：Masherbrum, K1; 10：Batura Sar, Batura I; 11：Rakaposhi; 12：Batura II; 13：Kanjut Sar; 14：Saltoro Kangri, K10; 15：Batura III; 16： Saser Kangri I, K22; 17：Chogolisa; 18：Shispare; 19：Trivor Sar; 20：Skyang Kangri; 21：Mamostong Kangri, K35; 22：Saser Kangri II; 23：Saser Kangri III; 24：Pumari Chhish; 25：Passu Sar; 26：Yukshin Gardan Sar; 27：Teram Kangri I; 28：Malubiting; 29：K12; 30：Sia Kangri; 31：Momhil Sar; 32：Skil Brum; 33：Haramosh Peak; 34：Ghent Kangri; 35：Ultar Sar; 36：Rimo Massif; 37：Sherpi Kangri; 38：Yazghil Dome South; 39：Baltoro Kangri; 40：Crown Peak; 41：Baintha Brakk; 42：Yutmaru Sar; 43：K6; 44：Muztagh Tower; 45：Diran; 46：Apsarasas Kangri I; 47：Rimo III; 48：Gasherbrum V; Location in Ladakh
- Location: Ladakh, India
- Parent range: Saser Muztagh, Karakoram

Climbing
- First ascent: 5 June 1973 by Dawa Norbu, Da Tenzing, Nima Tenzing, Thondup
- Easiest route: snow/ice climb

Saser Kangri (or Sasir Kangri) is a mountain in India. It is the highest peak in the Saser Muztagh, the easternmost subrange of the Karakoram range. Sasir Kangri is located within Ladakh.

== Saser Kangri massif ==
The Saser Kangri massif consists of six named peaks:

Saser Kangri I
7,672 m (25,171 ft)
Ranked 35th, Prominence = 2,304 m (7,559 ft) 34°52′00″N 77°45′09″E

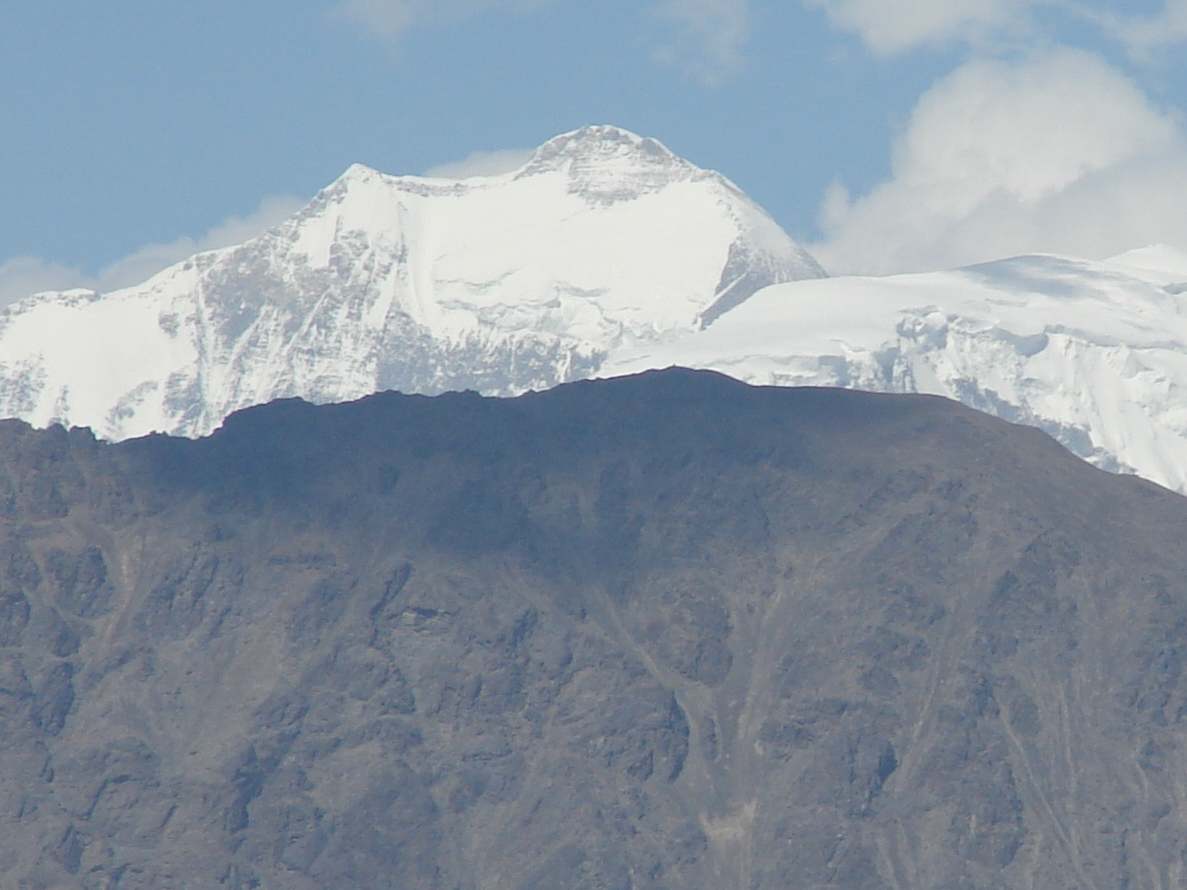
Saser Kangri I

Saser Kangri II East
7,518 m (24,665 ft)
Ranked 48th, Prominence = 1,450 m (4,757 ft) 34°48′15″N 77°48′18″E

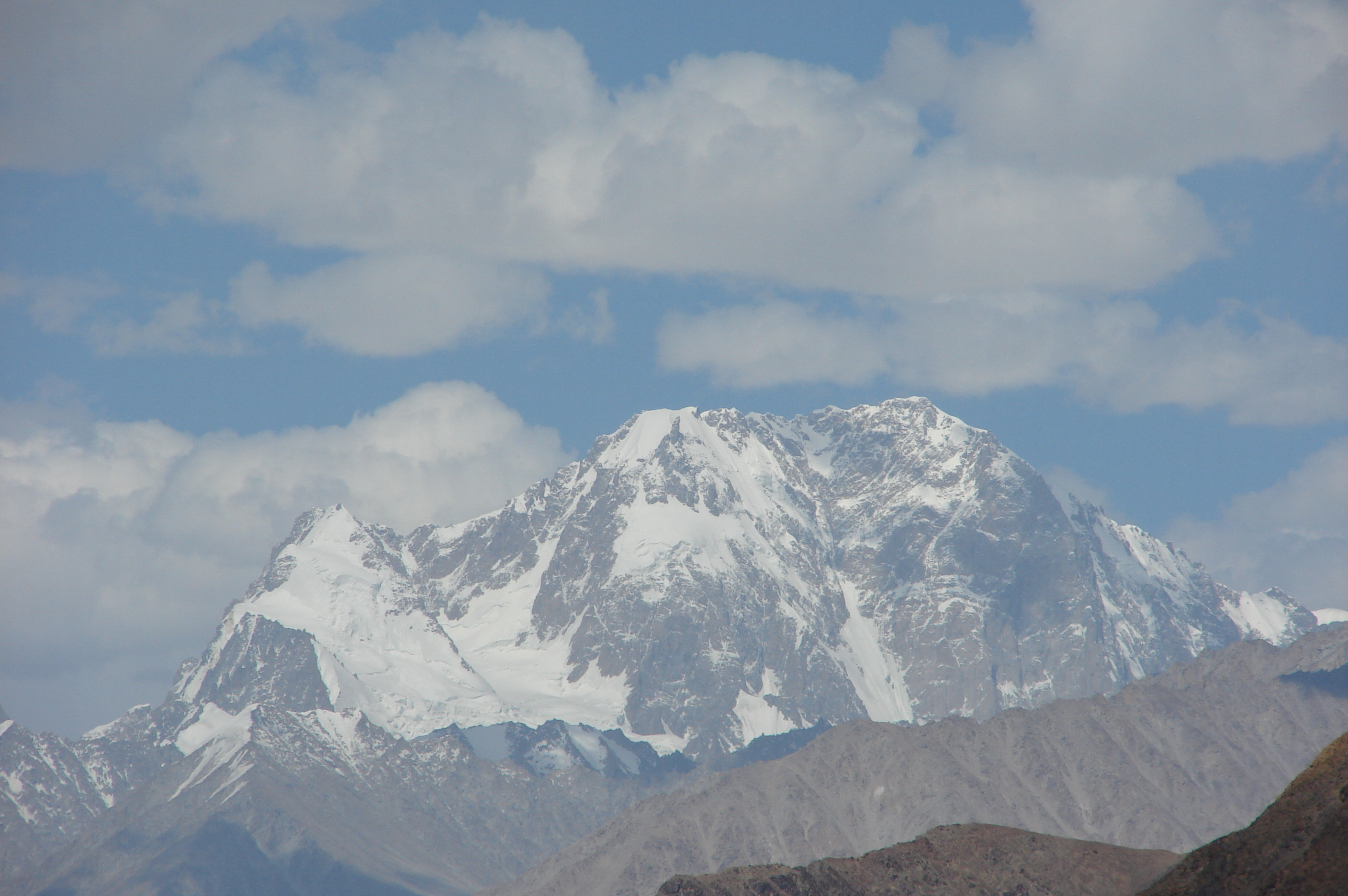
Saser Kangri II

Saser Kangri II West
7,500 m (24,600 ft)
^{†}

Saser Kangri III
7,495 m (24,590 ft)
Ranked 51st, Prominence = 850 m (2,789 ft) 34°50′44″N 77°47′06″E

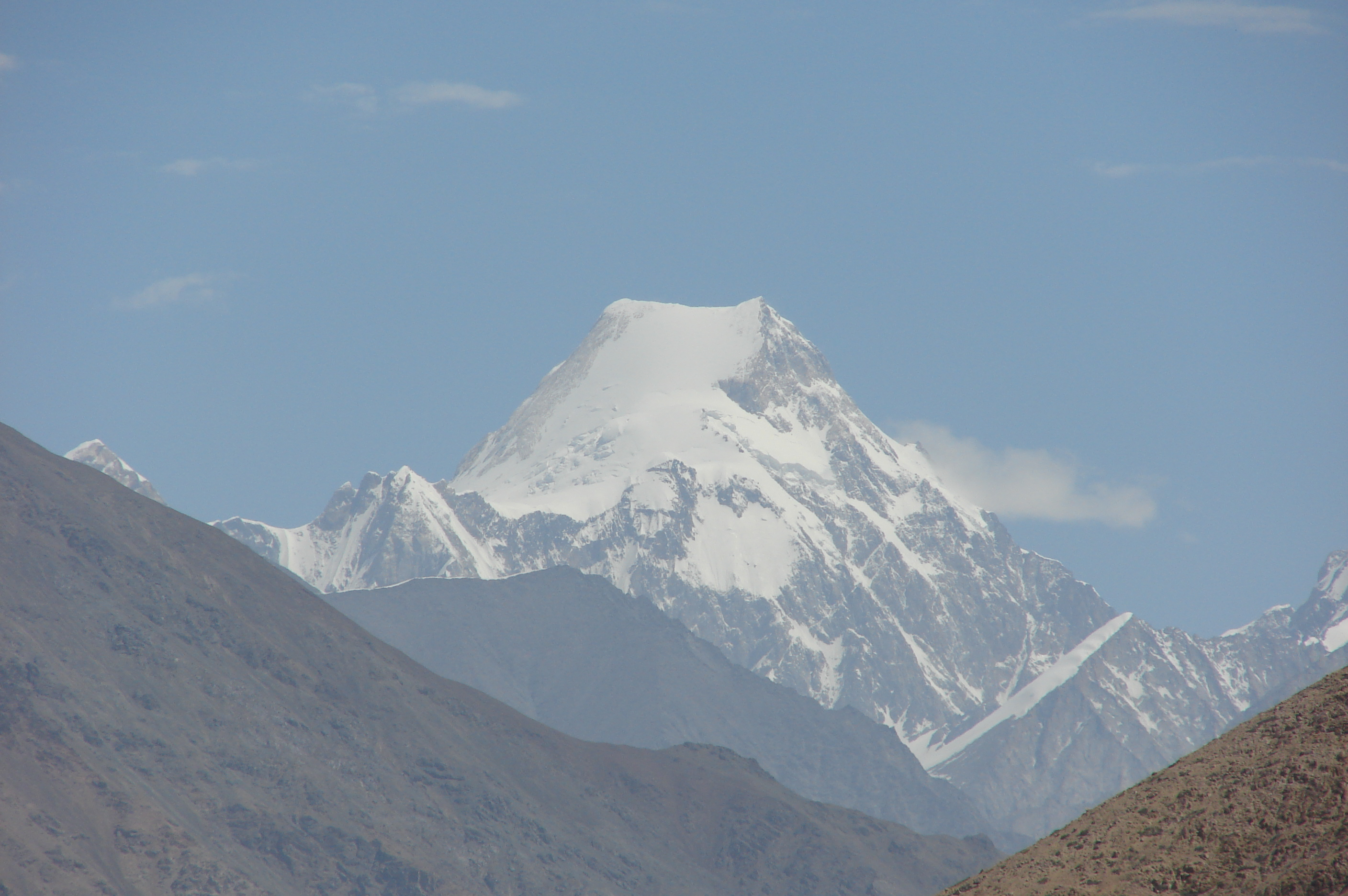
Saser Kangri III

Saser Kangri IV
7,416 m (24,331 ft)
^{†}

Plateau Peak
7,287 m (23,907 ft)
^{†}

This massif lies toward the northwestern end of the Saser Muztagh, at the head of the North Shukpa Kunchang Glacier, a major glacier which drains the eastern slopes of the group. The Sakang and Pukpoche Glaciers head on the western side of the group, and drain into the Nubra River.

== Climbing history ==
Early exploration and climbing attempts of Saser Kangri occurred on the western side, from the Nubra Valley; this is lower, more populated, and hence more easily accessible than the eastern side, which faces the Tibetan Plateau. Early European exploration included a visit in 1909 by explorer T. G. Longstaff, along with Arthur Neve and A. M. Slingsby. However, visits and failed climbing attempts by multiple groups on the western side over the period 1922-1970 showed that the western side was surprisingly difficult.

In 1973, an expedition of members of the Indo-Tibetan Border Police finally succeeded in making the first ascent of the peak, by a very different route. They approached the peak from the southeast, via the upper Shyok Valley and the North Shukpa Kunchang Glacier, a long and difficult journey. Only in 1987 did climbers succeed in ascending this peak from the western side: an Indian-British team led by V.Pandey and LS successfully climbed the peak in conjunction with the first ascent of Saser Kangri IV.

Saser Kangri II West was first climbed in 1984 by an Indo-Japanese team, who at the time, had believed the peak to be higher than Saser Kangri II East and only subsequently was it determined to be the lower of the two. Saser Kangri II East was first climbed by Mark Richey, Steve Swenson, and Freddie Wilkinson on August 24, 2011. Until then it was the world's second highest unclimbed mountain after Gangkhar Puensum, and they won a 2012 Piolet d'Or for their ascent.

Saser Kangri III was first climbed by an Indo-Tibetan Border Police expedition in 1986 using an eastern approach. The summit party consisted of the climbers: Budhiman, Neema Dorjee, Sher Singh, Tajwer Singh, Phurba Sherpa and Chhewang Somanla.

Accident on Saser Kangri IV (2018)

Pemba Sherpa (45) of Darjeeling, India went missing after falling down into a crevasse on Saser Kangri IV on 13 July 2018. He was climbing the peak Saser Kangri IV (7416m) with a team of climbers led by Basanta Singha Roy from West Bengal and another team from Pune, India. On his way down from summit, Pemba fell down into a crevasse before reaching Camp-1 at an altitude of 5750m. No rescue effort has yielded any results; he remains inside the crevasse.

Recovery Attempt: A sustained effort of recovery process was carried out by Indian Armed Forces composed of soldiers from the ITBP (Indo-Tibetan Border Police) and Siachen Battle School between 15 July and 31 July. Indian Army from SBS reached the site on 24 July. Despite interruptions due to inclement weather, they did manage to go down as far as possible until the crevasse became too narrow to negotiate. Their efforts proved unsuccessful and they did not find any trace of Pemba Sherpa, but they did manage to recover his loaded rucksack weighing about 35 kg.

== See also ==
- List of ultras of the Karakoram and Hindu Kush

== Notes ==
†.Saser Kangri II West, Saser Kangri IV and Plateau Peak lack sufficient prominence to be included or ranked in most lists of highest mountains.
