= Batura II =

Mountain in Pakistan

- بتورا ۲
- Location within Pakistan Location within Gilgit Baltistan
- The major peaks in Karakoram are rank identified by height. Legend: 1：K2; 2：Gasherbrum I, K5; 3：Broad Peak; 4：Gasherbrum II, K4; 5：Gasherbrum III, K3a; 6：Gasherbrum IV, K3; 7：Distaghil Sar; 8：Kunyang Chhish; 9：Masherbrum, K1; 10：Batura Sar, Batura I; 11：Rakaposhi; 12：Batura II; 13：Kanjut Sar; 14：Saltoro Kangri, K10; 15：Batura III; 16： Saser Kangri I, K22; 17：Chogolisa; 18：Shispare; 19：Trivor Sar; 20：Skyang Kangri; 21：Mamostong Kangri, K35; 22：Saser Kangri II; 23：Saser Kangri III; 24：Pumari Chhish; 25：Passu Sar; 26：Yukshin Gardan Sar; 27：Teram Kangri I; 28：Malubiting; 29：K12; 30：Sia Kangri; 31：Momhil Sar; 32：Skil Brum; 33：Haramosh Peak; 34：Ghent Kangri; 35：Ultar Sar; 36：Rimo Massif; 37：Sherpi Kangri; 38：Yazghil Dome South; 39：Baltoro Kangri; 40：Crown Peak; 41：Baintha Brakk; 42：Yutmaru Sar; 43：K6; 44：Muztagh Tower; 45：Diran; 46：Apsarasas Kangri I; 47：Rimo III; 48：Gasherbrum V; Location in Gilgit-Baltistan

Highest point
- Elevation: 7,762 m (25,466 ft)
- Prominence: 90 m (300 ft)
- Parent peak: Batura Sar (7795 m)
- Isolation: 0.06 km (0.037 mi)
- Listing: Mountains of Pakistan
- Coordinates: 36°31′08″N 74°30′29″E

Geography
- Location: Gilgit-Baltistan, Pakistan.
- Parent range: Karakoram

Climbing
- First ascent: 2008 by Kim Chang-ho and Choi Suk-mun

Batura II
- Simplified Chinese: 巴托拉II峰
Transcriptions

Batura II (Urdu: بتورا ۲), also known as Hunza Kunji or Peak 31, is a 7,762-metre-high (25,466 ft) peak in the Batura Muztagh, which is the westernmost subrange of the Karakoram range, in the Gilgit-Baltistan region in northern Pakistan. It was first ascended in 2008 by a South Korean duo from the University of Seoul Alpine Club consisting of Kim Chang-ho and Choi Suk-mun.

== Location ==
Batura II lies in the Batura Muztagh, which is a part of the Karakoram range, lying west of the Hunza River. The river curves around the southwest, west, and northwest sides of the Batura Muztagh. Batura Sar lies east to the peak, and along with Batura III, Batura IV, and other lower peaks, they form part of the Batura Wall.

== First Ascent ==
The summit was first climbed on August 11, 2008, by Kim Chang-ho and Choi Suk-mun.
