= Pumari Chhish =

Mountain in Pakistan

Pumari Chhish پماری چش
- Location within Pakistan Location within Gilgit Baltistan
- The major peaks in Karakoram are rank identified by height. Legend: 1：K2; 2：Gasherbrum I, K5; 3：Broad Peak; 4：Gasherbrum II, K4; 5：Gasherbrum III, K3a; 6：Gasherbrum IV, K3; 7：Distaghil Sar; 8：Kunyang Chhish; 9：Masherbrum, K1; 10：Batura Sar, Batura I; 11：Rakaposhi; 12：Batura II; 13：Kanjut Sar; 14：Saltoro Kangri, K10; 15：Batura III; 16： Saser Kangri I, K22; 17：Chogolisa; 18：Shispare; 19：Trivor Sar; 20：Skyang Kangri; 21：Mamostong Kangri, K35; 22：Saser Kangri II; 23：Saser Kangri III; 24：Pumari Chhish; 25：Passu Sar; 26：Yukshin Gardan Sar; 27：Teram Kangri I; 28：Malubiting; 29：K12; 30：Sia Kangri; 31：Momhil Sar; 32：Skil Brum; 33：Haramosh Peak; 34：Ghent Kangri; 35：Ultar Sar; 36：Rimo Massif; 37：Sherpi Kangri; 38：Yazghil Dome South; 39：Baltoro Kangri; 40：Crown Peak; 41：Baintha Brakk; 42：Yutmaru Sar; 43：K6; 44：Muztagh Tower; 45：Diran; 46：Apsarasas Kangri I; 47：Rimo III; 48：Gasherbrum V; Location in Gilgit-Baltistan

Highest point
- Elevation: 7,492 m (24,580 ft); Ranked 53rd
- Prominence: 890 m (2,920 ft)
- Listing: Mountains of Pakistan
- Coordinates: 36°12′40″N 75°15′10″E

Geography
- Location: Gilgit-Baltistan, Pakistan
- Parent range: Hispar Muztagh, Karakoram

Climbing
- First ascent: 1979 by S. Chiba, K. Minami, M. Ohashi, H. Yokoyama (Japanese)Capt. Nazar Abbas Awan (Pakistan)
- Easiest route: North Ridge: glacier/snow/ice climb

Pumari Chhish
- Traditional Chinese: 普馬里基什峰
Transcriptions

Pumari Chhish (Urdu: پماری چش), is a group of peaks in the Shimshal Valley, in the Karakoram range in Gilgit-Baltistan, Pakistan. The central peak, (or Pumarikish, Peak 11) rises to 7,492m. It lies about 4 km east of Khunyang Chhish, in the heart of the Hispar, north of the Hispar Glacier.

Other peaks in the group include Pumari Chhish South and Pumari Chhish East. Pumari Chhish South lies about 1 km (0.6 mi) to the southeast of the main summit of Pumari Chhish and reaches 7,350 m (24,110 ft). The 6,850-meter Pumari Chhish East is located off the Hispar Glacier.

== Climbing History ==
=== Pumari Chhish ===
Pumari Chhish was first attempted by an Austrian group in 1974, who failed to climb or bypass the Yazghil Glacier on the north side of the peak. In 1979, a Japanese group from the Hokkaido Alpine Association and an officer of the Pakistan Army from 29 Signal (a unit of the army's Corps of Signals) succeeded in climbing the mountain via a long route starting from the Khunyang Glacier, well to the west of the peak. They first had to cross a significant col to access the upper Yazghil Glacier; they then ascended the north ridge of Pumari Chhish.

According to the Himalayan Index, there have been no other successful ascents of Pumari Chhish.

=== Pumari Chhish South ===
After two unsuccessful attempts on this peak in 1999 and 2000 by Julie-Ann Clyma and Roger Payne, it was first climbed on June 12, 2007, by Yannick Graziani and Christian Trommsdorff. Among first ascents of peaks over 7000 metres, their 2,700 m (8,900 ft) climb was highly technical (they rate it ABO 5.10 M6 A1). They made the ascent in pure alpine style over six days. Their achievement earned them the lead article in the 2008 American Alpine Journal.

=== Pumari Chhish East ===
The first successful ascent of Pumari Chhish East was via the south face on 29 June 2022. The ascent was made by Christophe Ogier, Victor Saucede and Jérôme Sullivan via a direct route they named The Crystal Ship and graded M7, 6b, A2, 1600m. The successful climb was awarded one of the 2023 Piolets d'Or.

Before the successful ascent, there had only been three previous attempts to climb this peak.
