= Yutmaru Sar =

Mountain in Pakistan

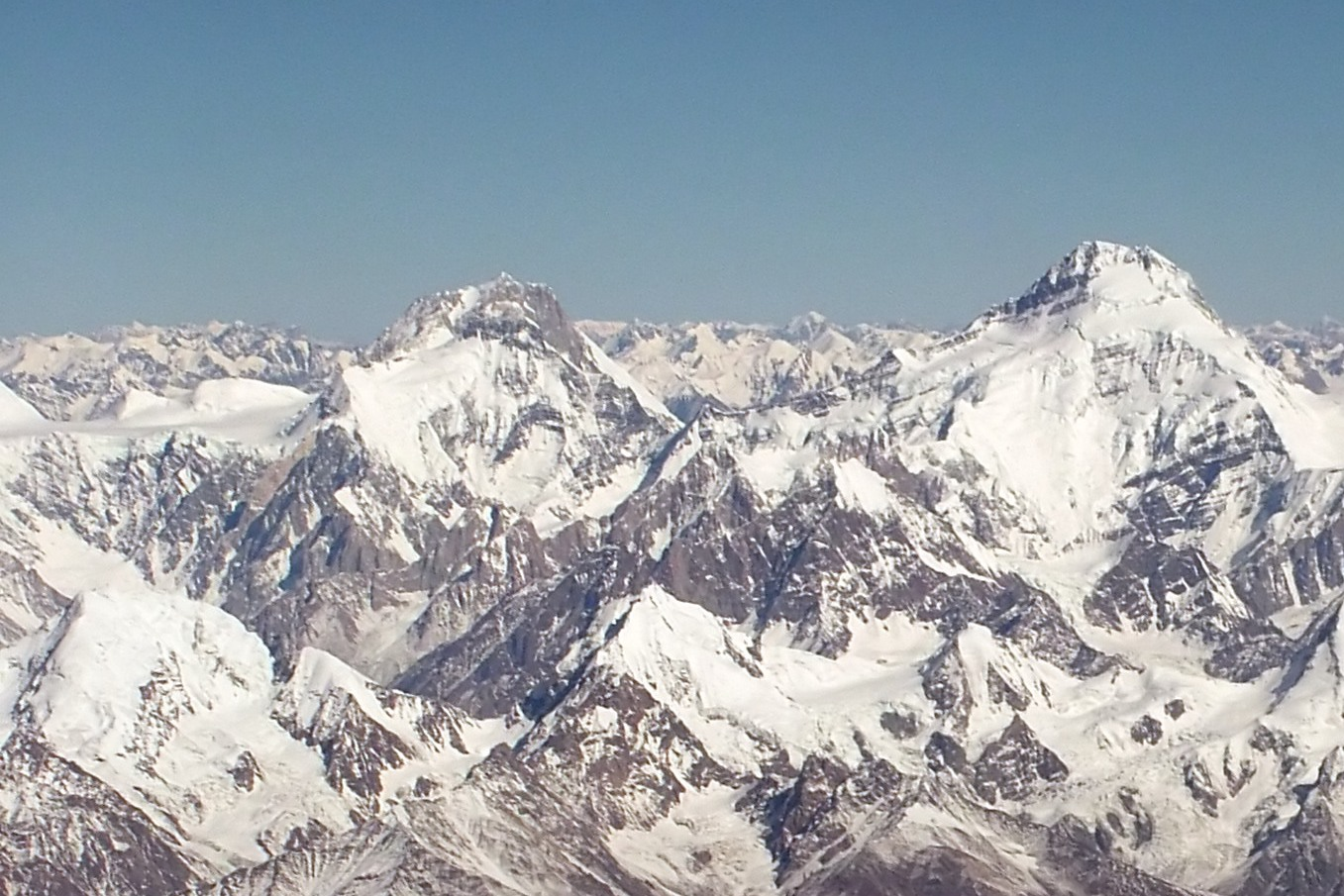
- Aerial view of the Karakorams: Yukshin Gardan Sar (left) and Kanjut Sar (right), Yutmaru Sar is directly in front of Yuksin Gardan Sar

Highest point
- Elevation: 7,283 m (23,894 ft); Ranked 87th
- Prominence: 620 m (2,030 ft)
- Parent peak: Yukshin Gardan Sar
- Coordinates: 36°14′N 75°22′E

Geography
- Location within Pakistan Location within Gilgit Baltistan
- The major peaks in Karakoram are rank identified by height. Legend: 1：K2; 2：Gasherbrum I, K5; 3：Broad Peak; 4：Gasherbrum II, K4; 5：Gasherbrum III, K3a; 6：Gasherbrum IV, K3; 7：Distaghil Sar; 8：Kunyang Chhish; 9：Masherbrum, K1; 10：Batura Sar, Batura I; 11：Rakaposhi; 12：Batura II; 13：Kanjut Sar; 14：Saltoro Kangri, K10; 15：Batura III; 16： Saser Kangri I, K22; 17：Chogolisa; 18：Shispare; 19：Trivor Sar; 20：Skyang Kangri; 21：Mamostong Kangri, K35; 22：Saser Kangri II; 23：Saser Kangri III; 24：Pumari Chhish; 25：Passu Sar; 26：Yukshin Gardan Sar; 27：Teram Kangri I; 28：Malubiting; 29：K12; 30：Sia Kangri; 31：Momhil Sar; 32：Skil Brum; 33：Haramosh Peak; 34：Ghent Kangri; 35：Ultar Sar; 36：Rimo Massif; 37：Sherpi Kangri; 38：Yazghil Dome South; 39：Baltoro Kangri; 40：Crown Peak; 41：Baintha Brakk; 42：Yutmaru Sar; 43：K6; 44：Muztagh Tower; 45：Diran; 46：Apsarasas Kangri I; 47：Rimo III; 48：Gasherbrum V; Location in Gilgit-Baltistan
- Location: Gilgit-Baltistan, Pakistan
- Parent range: Hispar Muztagh, Karakoram

Climbing
- First ascent: 1980
- Easiest route: Snow/ice climb

Yutmaru Sar is a mountain in the Hispar mountain range, a subrange of the Karakoram, in the Gilgit-Baltistan region of Pakistan. At an elevation of 7,283 m (23,894 ft), it is the 87th highest mountain in the world. Yutmaru Sar lies west of Kanjut Sar north of the Hispar Glacier. It was first climbed on July 22, 1980, by a Japanese team.
