= Kanjut Sar =

Mountain in Pakistan

- کنجت سر
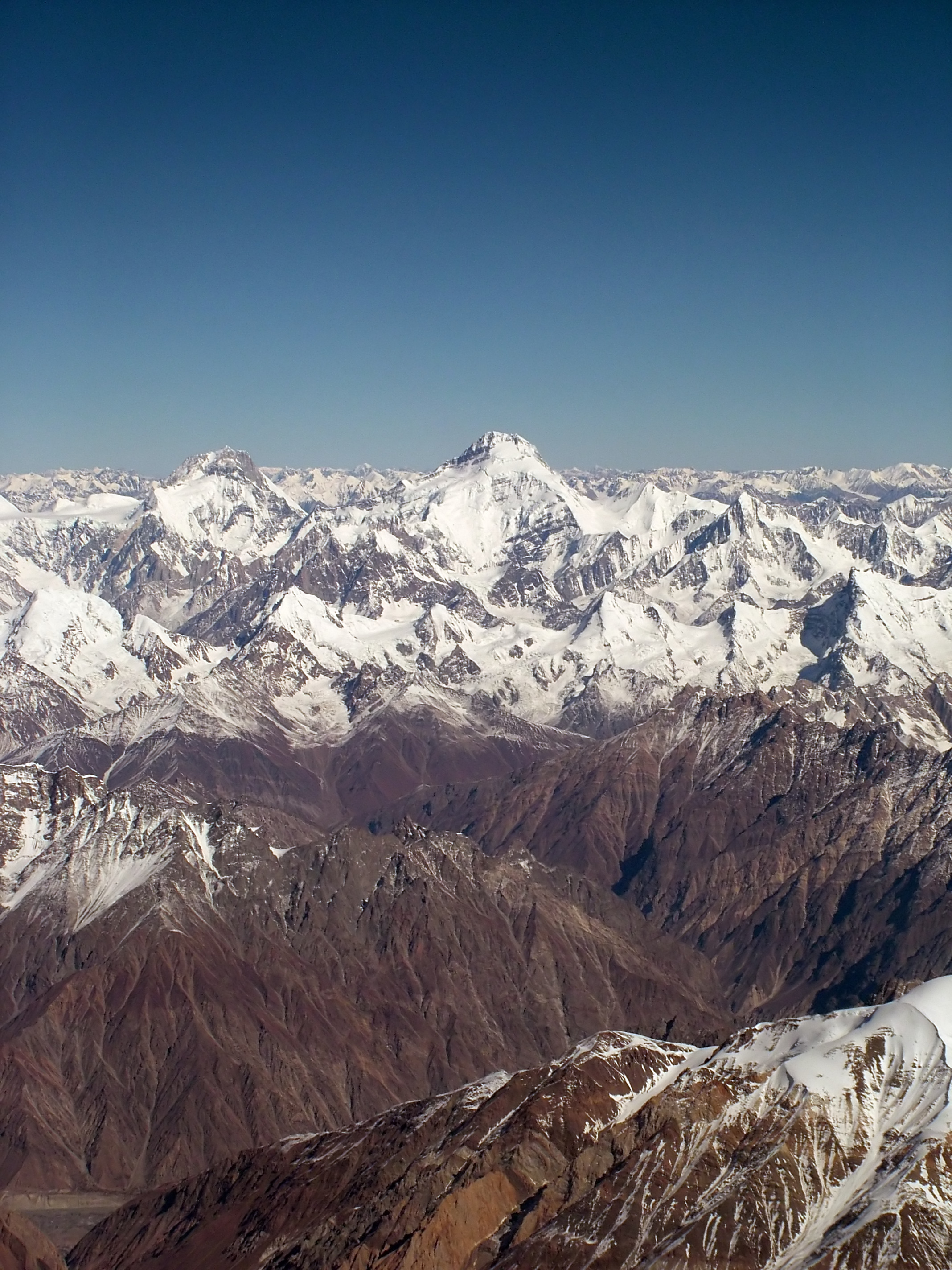
- Yukshin Gardan Sar (background left) and Kanjut Sar (background centre)

Highest point
- Elevation: 7,760 m (25,460 ft); Ranked 28th
- Prominence: 1,660 m (5,450 ft)
- Listing: Mountains of Pakistan; Ultra
- Coordinates: 36°12′18″N 75°25′06″E

Geography
- Location within Pakistan Location within Gilgit Baltistan
- The major peaks in Karakoram are rank identified by height. Legend: 1：K2; 2：Gasherbrum I, K5; 3：Broad Peak; 4：Gasherbrum II, K4; 5：Gasherbrum III, K3a; 6：Gasherbrum IV, K3; 7：Distaghil Sar; 8：Kunyang Chhish; 9：Masherbrum, K1; 10：Batura Sar, Batura I; 11：Rakaposhi; 12：Batura II; 13：Kanjut Sar; 14：Saltoro Kangri, K10; 15：Batura III; 16： Saser Kangri I, K22; 17：Chogolisa; 18：Shispare; 19：Trivor Sar; 20：Skyang Kangri; 21：Mamostong Kangri, K35; 22：Saser Kangri II; 23：Saser Kangri III; 24：Pumari Chhish; 25：Passu Sar; 26：Yukshin Gardan Sar; 27：Teram Kangri I; 28：Malubiting; 29：K12; 30：Sia Kangri; 31：Momhil Sar; 32：Skil Brum; 33：Haramosh Peak; 34：Ghent Kangri; 35：Ultar Sar; 36：Rimo Massif; 37：Sherpi Kangri; 38：Yazghil Dome South; 39：Baltoro Kangri; 40：Crown Peak; 41：Baintha Brakk; 42：Yutmaru Sar; 43：K6; 44：Muztagh Tower; 45：Diran; 46：Apsarasas Kangri I; 47：Rimo III; 48：Gasherbrum V; Location in Gilgit-Baltistan
- Location: Gilgit-Baltistan, Pakistan
- Parent range: Hispar Muztagh, Karakoram

Climbing
- First ascent: 1959 by Camillo Pellissier
- Easiest route: snow/ice climb

Kanjut Sar
- Simplified Chinese: 坎巨提峰
Transcriptions

Kanjut Sar (Urdu: کنجوت سر) is a mountain located between Shimshal Valley and Hisper Valley in the Karakoram mountain range. It is the 28th-highest mountain in the world. Kanjut is the native name of the Hunza valley while Sar means mountain peak in Burushaski.

Kanjut Sar consists of two peaks:

- Kanjut Sar I at 7,760 metres (25,459 ft).
- Kanjut Sar II, to the southeast of I, at 6,831 m (22,411 ft).

Kanjut Sar I was first climbed in 1959 by Camillo Pellissier, member of an Italian expedition directed by Guido Monzino. From 4 to 6 August 1981, seven Japanese climbers of the same expedition climbed to the top.

The first ascent of Kanjut Sar II was achieved by a Swiss team in 1985. Expedition leader Toni Spirig, Ueli Stahel and Richie Ott finally carried it out in alpine style after several attempts . The climbers reached the summit on July 10. The ascent route led over the north-west side.

On July 29, 1990, a Dutch expedition made the second ascent of Kanjut Sar II in alpine style via the south face. Expedition members were Peter Kok, Frank Schmidt, Franck van den Barselaer, Hendrik Freie and Pieter de Kam.

== See also ==
- Highest mountains of the world
- List of ultras of the Karakoram and Hindu Kush
