= Gasherbrum V =

Mountain in Gilgit-Baltistan, Pakistan

- گاشربرم - 5
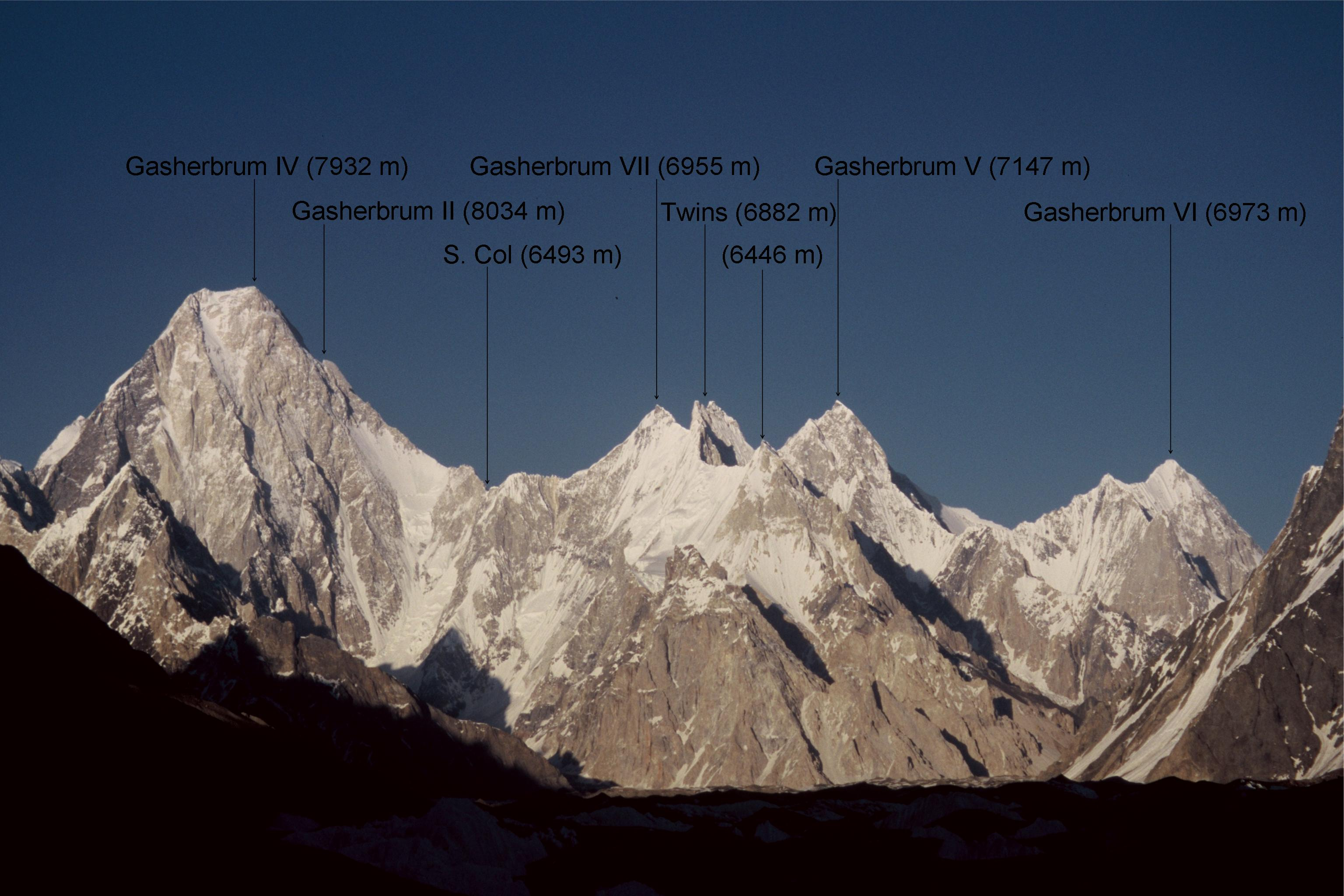
- West faces of Gasherbrum massif, V is right centre

Highest point
- Elevation: 7,147 m (23,448 ft)
- Prominence: 654 m (2,146 ft)
- Listing: Mountains of Pakistan
- Coordinates: 35°44′N 76°37′E

Geography
- Location within Pakistan Location within Gilgit Baltistan
- The major peaks in Karakoram are rank identified by height. Legend: 1：K2; 2：Gasherbrum I, K5; 3：Broad Peak; 4：Gasherbrum II, K4; 5：Gasherbrum III, K3a; 6：Gasherbrum IV, K3; 7：Distaghil Sar; 8：Kunyang Chhish; 9：Masherbrum, K1; 10：Batura Sar, Batura I; 11：Rakaposhi; 12：Batura II; 13：Kanjut Sar; 14：Saltoro Kangri, K10; 15：Batura III; 16： Saser Kangri I, K22; 17：Chogolisa; 18：Shispare; 19：Trivor Sar; 20：Skyang Kangri; 21：Mamostong Kangri, K35; 22：Saser Kangri II; 23：Saser Kangri III; 24：Pumari Chhish; 25：Passu Sar; 26：Yukshin Gardan Sar; 27：Teram Kangri I; 28：Malubiting; 29：K12; 30：Sia Kangri; 31：Momhil Sar; 32：Skil Brum; 33：Haramosh Peak; 34：Ghent Kangri; 35：Ultar Sar; 36：Rimo Massif; 37：Sherpi Kangri; 38：Yazghil Dome South; 39：Baltoro Kangri; 40：Crown Peak; 41：Baintha Brakk; 42：Yutmaru Sar; 43：K6; 44：Muztagh Tower; 45：Diran; 46：Apsarasas Kangri I; 47：Rimo III; 48：Gasherbrum V; Location in Gilgit-Baltistan
- Location: Gilgit–Baltistan (Pakistan)
- Parent range: Karakoram, Gasherbrum

Climbing
- First ascent: July 25, 2014 by Seong Nakjong and An Chi Young

Gasherbrum V
- Traditional Chinese: 加舒爾布魯木V峰
Transcriptions

Gasherbrum V (Urdu: گاشر برم ۔ ۵) is a mountain in the Gasherbrum massif, located in the Karakoram range in Gilgit–Baltistan, Pakistan.

== Location and naming ==
The Gasherbrum massif is a remote group of peaks located at the northeastern end of the Baltoro Glacier in the Karakoram range of the Himalaya. The massif contains three of the world's 8,000 metre peaks (if one includes Broad Peak). Gasherbrum is often claimed to mean "Shining Wall", presumably a reference to the highly visible face of Gasherbrum IV; but in fact it comes from "rgasha" (beautiful) + "brum" (mountain) in Balti, hence it actually means "beautiful mountain."

While the four highest Gasherbrum peaks (Gasherbrum I to IV) have been named and numbered since the 19th century, Gasherbrum V (as well as its neighbour Gasherbrum VI) were only considered as "Peaks on the south ridge of Gasherbrum IV". The Swiss geologist and Himalayan expert Günter Oskar Dyhrenfurth recommended to give this independent mountain an own name and proposed in 1934 the name of "Gasherbrum V", which is now well established.

== Altitude and climbing status ==
Although in former literature a height around 7,320 m was traditionally given, the mountain is more likely to be around 7,150 m high. The Russian military 1:100,000 topographical map shows a height of 7,120 m. The currently most accurate map of the region probably is that in the series of "Maps of Snow Mountains in China", which gives a height of 7,147 m. On this map the pass connecting to Gasherbrum IV is 6,493 m high (654 m prominence).

== See also ==
- Concordia (Karakoram)
