= Yugo, Baltistan =

Coordinates: 35°11′8″N 76°9′49″E

Yugo (یول گو) یوگو
- Village
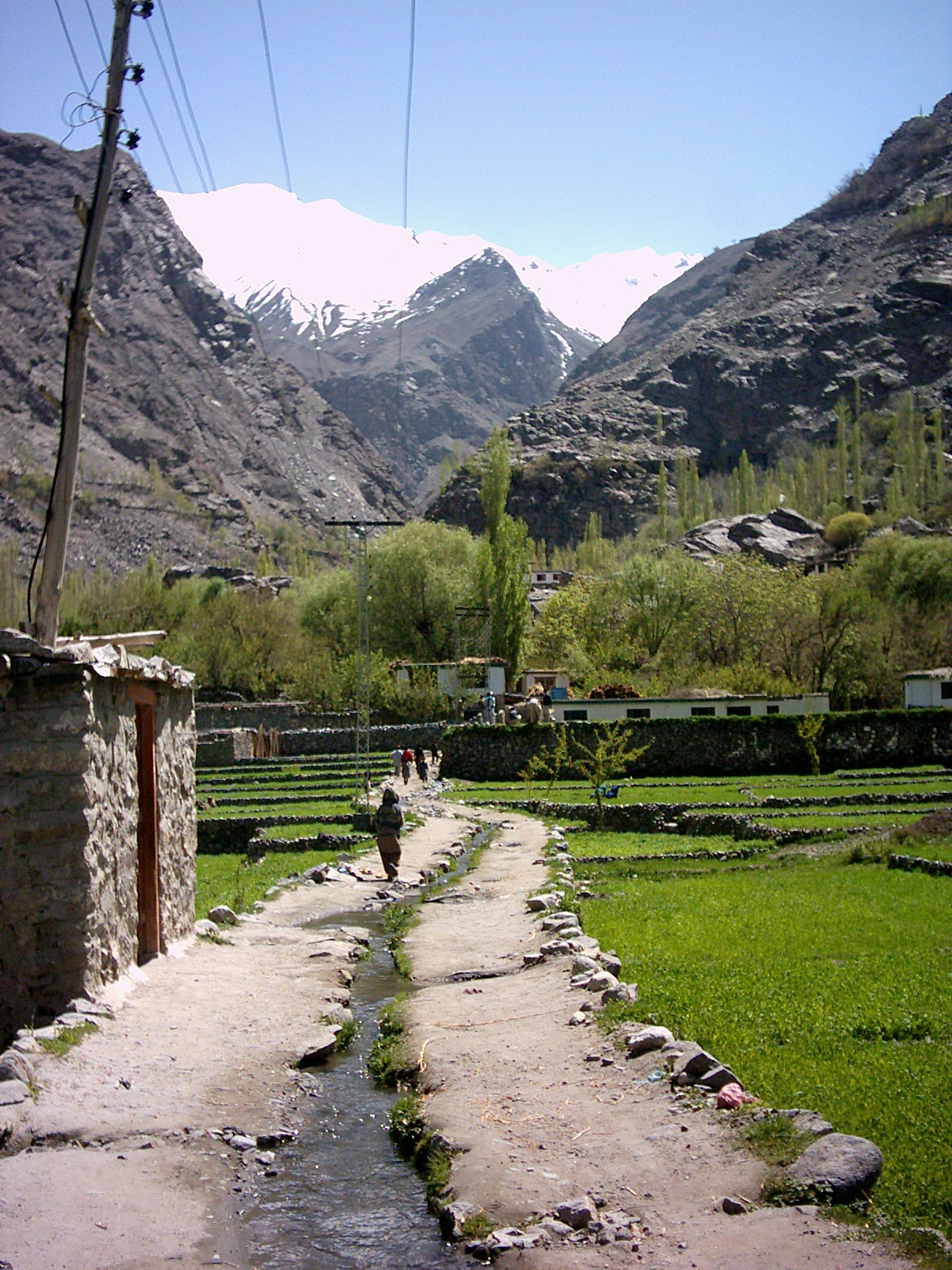
- Yugo

- Location in Pakistan
- Country: Pakistan
- Administrative unit: Gilgit-Baltistan
- District: Ghanche District
- Elevation: 2,472 m (8,111 ft)

Population
  - Total: 6,000
- Time zone: UTC+5 (PST)
  - Summer (DST): UTC+6 (GMT+6)

Yugo (Yugu) is a small village with a population of more than 6,000 people in the Ghanche district of Baltistan, Gilgit-Baltistan, Pakistan. The village is located above the Shyok River 70 km from Baltistan's capital Skardu on a tarmac highway heading towards Khaplu after passing Ghawari and Kunes. Yugo is situated adjacent to the geographically important village of Kharfaq which boasts of a high-altitude mountain lake, Lake Kharfaq. Khaplu, which is Ghanche district's administrative capital, lies 25 km from Yugo.

Yugo is territorially separated from Kharfaq by a strategically important landmark- the "Kharfaq Bridge" which separates the territories of Yugo and Kharfaq. Kharfaq village lies on its immediate east, Ghawari on the west, Kharmang on the southern side and Balghar on the northeast. Yugo consists of four colonies: 'Yugo proper', Albok, Fazlee Colony and Sirkiting (Baqir Colony). Fazlee Colony and Baqir Colony are separated by a glacier water stream. A small bridge, the Sirkiting bridge, connects Sirkiting and Yugo proper. The people of Yugo refer to themselves as Yugupa. The Shyok River meanders around the edges of the village, between the Bragh, a towering huge bald rocky mountain, and the village. A sandy area of the river bank on the north of the village across Shyok River which is locally referred to as Foshfosh is part of Yugo territory.

== Education ==
Hundreds of students continue to study basic religious education in local madrassas or seminaries and then proceed to Ghawari for higher studies, some eventually ending up at Madinah University in Saudi Arabia and Kuwait University. This is attributed to the fact that most of the village's inhabitants profess a form of Islam that is close to the Saudi version of Salafi Islam, known as Ahl al-Hadith in the South Asian region. However, the people of Yugo get along very well with their Noorbakshi and Shia neighbours and are thought to be very tolerant compared to most of their Arab counterparts. All baltis regardless of creed share a common cultural and linguistic heritage.

== Origins ==
Due to ideological persecution. While details of their persecution are controversial, they are believed to be more secular with a love for music especially drums-Dang. The two apo were joined by another religious man Apo Baqir from Khaplu who fled religious persecution and eventually settled in nearby Skirkiting. Eventually their descendants formed the twin villages of Yugo and Skirkiting. The people of both Yugo proper and Skirkiting now generally regard themselves as Yugupa although some sections of smaller subsets within the community still prefer to maintain their original identities. For example, the people of Skirkiting sometimes refer to themselves as Baqirpa to differentiate themselves from the other Yugupas based on their being descendants of Apo Baqir. Generally, the people of Yugo proper display more caucasoid features being fairer, taller and with lighter and more broader eyes as compared to the people from Skirkiting who are more Tibetan in their features with slanted epicanthial folds and shorter, stouter stature and darker complexion. This is attributed to their different origins- the people of Skirkiting being closer to their Tibetan origin kinsmen in Khaplu as opposed to the people of Yugo proper, who are of Turkic and Aryan origin like their counterparts in Gilgit. However, following numerous intermarriages, this may not always be true and it is now common to have mixed characteristics on both sides.

== The people of Yugo ==
The people of Yugo have maintained their unique identities and yet share cultural and religious beliefs. They profess a more tolerant version of Ahl al-Hadith sect of Sunni Islam. Several decades ago, Yugupas were all Sufia Nurbakhshi but following intense preaching by the late Sheikh-ul-Hadith Mufti Azam Maulana Abdul Qadir Baltistani and his contemporaries from Skirkiting like the late Apo Jaafar, they converted to Ahl al-Hadith form of Islam. Despite the love for music by most Baltis, it was banned after a religious revival movement by Sheikh-ul-Hadith Mufti Azam Maulana Abdul Qadir Baltistani in the late 1960s. Intermarriages between the two communities of Skirkiting and Yugo proper over time have led to more integration with the Yugupa now acquiring a relatively homogenous identity.

Due to shortage of arable land and other resources, it is now estimated that more than half of its original inhabitants migrated to mainland Pakistan and overseas in search of better life including employment opportunities and both religious and secular education. Many Yugupa work in the UAE, Saudi Arabia and Kuwait, teachers, labourers and drivers with a few in the engineering, medical and marketing sectors. A number of Yugupa, most of them in mainland Pakistan and a handful abroad in North America, Australia and Africa are professionals in the medical and engineering sector.

== Language ==
Most of the current inhabitants speak Balti dialect similar to other areas of Baltistan, although the style of speaking is slightly different from other areas of Baltistan. Yugupa speak a dialect that is rougher, louder and with less emphasis on traditional intonation, and less strain on the vowels at the end of speech than some of their counterparts for example in Khaplu.

== Geography and biodiversity of Yugo ==
Geographically, Yugo resembles much of the other Himalayan regions. The village settlements are at an average altitude of 10498 ft above sea level with the lowest point of the village- Fosh Fosh Thung which is a sandy river shore being 9186 ft above sea level close to the River Shyok. There are towering ice-capped mountains in the surrounding areas including Sn'gonpo Ran'ga – a high altitude plateau around 13,000 ft above sea level, as well as mountains Ming met la, Marpho khiyang ra la, Hyaqra, Khi sa and Dindaq khilas, which are all at heights greater than 16,000 feet (4,900 m) above sea level at their peaks. There are also cultivable (in summer) highland slopes like the Ltep La – which resembles the steppes, Ghorawat, Burat La and Thangwa. The area is in an earthquake-prone area close to Eurasian faultlines with minor earthquakes and tremors – Sa gul felt not so infrequently. The village also has a permanent spring which is the main source of clean drinking water provided to the houses via pipes. Electricity generated from hydroelectric power from the gushing glacier water streams from a neighbouring village is available in Yugo but supply is erratic and voltage fluctuations and outages are common. The mountain areas are known to have a number of endangered species like the snow leopard, brown bear, red fox also known as Waa and the beautiful Ibex which is a wild mountain goat locally known as Markhor. Exotic birds such as the Himalayan eagle, pheasants, chikor and partridges can also be spotted in the area. The rivers are rich in fresh-water fish like the Saanya and the Trout. Rare flowers and plants can also be spotted in summer and spring on the mountains.

== Other names and spellings for Yugo ==
Yugo is spelled Yugu, Yuogo Yugu, Northern Areas, Pakistan or Yougo.

== See also ==
- Balti people
- Balti language
- Baltistan
- Ghanche
- Skardu
- Northern Areas
