= Thalay =

Valley in Gilgit-Baltistan, Pakistan

Thalay تھلے Thally
- Union Council
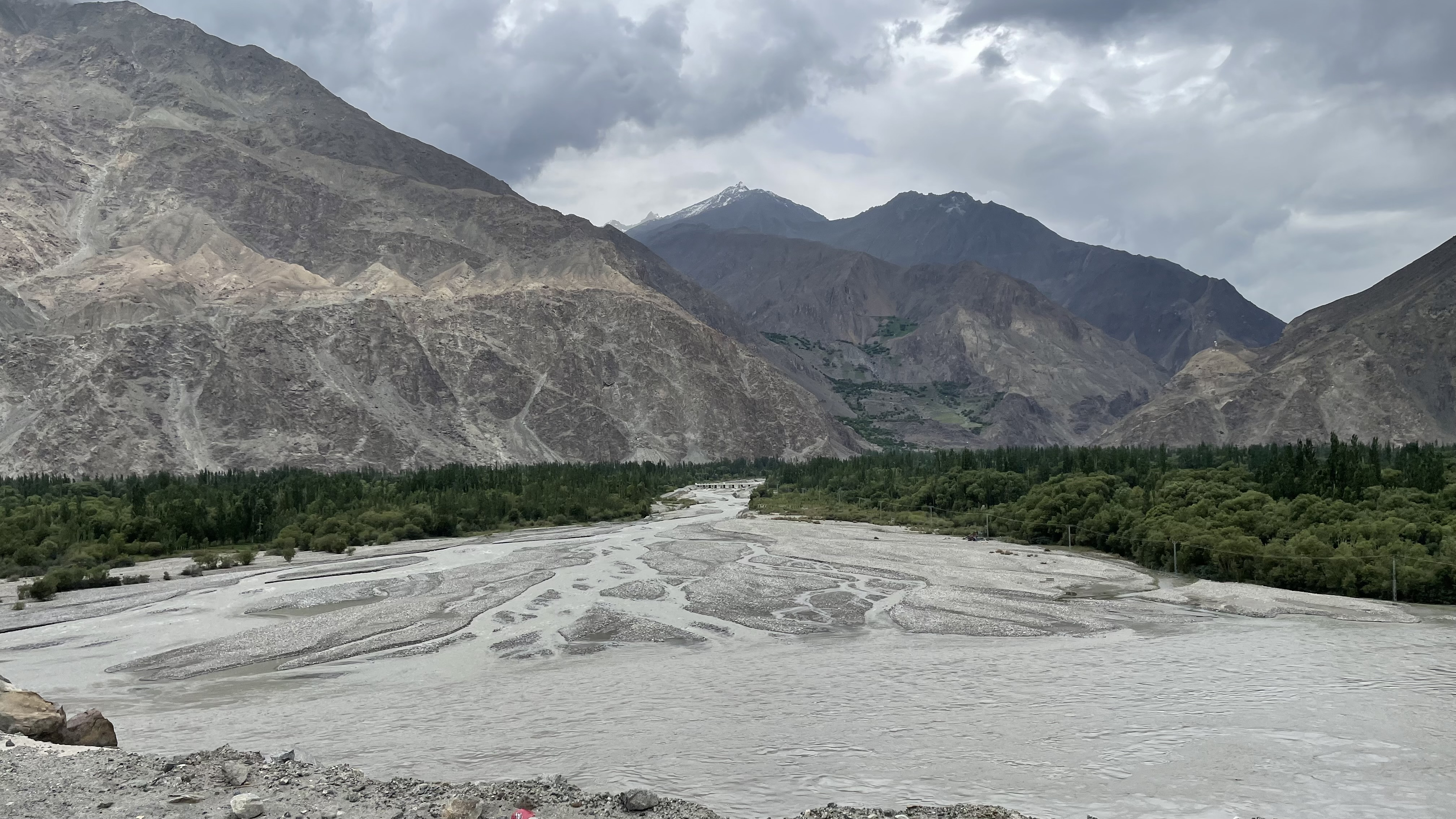
- Confluence of Thalla and Shyok rivers looking north
- Interactive map of Thalay
- Coordinates: 35.30997°N 76.15791°E
- Country: Pakistan
- State: Gilgit-Baltistan
- District: Ghanche
- Tehsil: Chorbat

Dimensions
  - Length: 40 km (25 mi)
  - Width: 20 km (12 mi)
- Elevation: 2,647 m (8,684 ft)

The Thalay Valley (Balti / Urdu: تھلے), located in the southeastern part of Baltistan within the Ghanche District of Gilgit-Baltistan, Pakistan, is a side valley of Khaplu Valley. The valley ascends from 2,500 meters above sea level to Thalay La, a pass at 4,576 meters. The Thalay Valley and its surrounding mountains serve as a natural habitat for various wildlife, including Ibex.

== History ==
Historically, the Thalay La pass provided a connection to the Shigar Valley; however, following the construction of a road in 1985 that linked Thalay to the Skardu-Khaplu road, the significance of the pass has waned. Today, it is primarily traversed by yaks and the occasional trekker. The Himalayan Ibex typically inhabits high-altitude pastures, ranging from 3,500 to 5,200 meters above sea level.

== Geography ==
The valley is located approximately 35 km northwest of Khaplu, the Ghanche district headquarters, and 110 km from Skardu. It is bordered by the Hushe Valley to the east, the Keris Valley to the south-west, and the Shigar Valley to the north-west. The residents of the valley are known as Thalaypa. Stretching 40 km in length and about 20 km in width, the valley is situated along the Thalla River, which is part of the Shyok basin. The river converges with the Shyok River at the southern end of the valley, near Daghoni Balgar.

Khasurmik is the northernmost village in Upper Thalay, situated at an altitude of 3,150 meters.

=== Climate change ===
The valley has witnessed climate change, like a noticeable delay in the onset of the snow season each year, accompanied by an increase in rainfall. Consequently, the frequency and severity of flooding have risen by 45% over the past 30 years. Thalay Valley is notably among the most vulnerable valleys in the wider Karakoram, especially concerning pasture degradation and potential future threats.

Thalay lies within a double cropping zone, where wheat, potatoes, and barley serve as the primary subsistence crops, while maize and fodder are grown as secondary crops. Despite this, 95% of households rely on purchasing wheat from outside the valley for their consumption.

== Socioeconomic ==
S/No Description about Thalay Union Council Number

- Elevation (in meters) 2600 to 7150
- Number of Settlement 16
- Total length of the valley (in KM) 40
- Number of Glaciers 5
- Number of Natural Lake 6
- Shingchang Pass (in meters) 4700
- Cropping zone Single Human Resource
- Total Household 1746
- Household Size 10
- Male 6500
- Female 6460
- Total Population 12960
- Male Literacy Ratio 60%
- Female Literacy Ratio 50%
- Tourism related persons 5%
- Servicemen 15%
- Skilled Person 5%
- Businessmen 4%
- / Farmer 70%
- Poor 38%
- Poorest 4%
- Rich 2%
- Disable 320
- Orphan 260

== Education ==
The awareness of getting education in Thalay started hundreds of years ago. From that era most of them became Islamic school. After 1945 the few parents sent their children to school. They were 8–12 in number from village Harangus, yarkhor and baltoro. One of them became successful to get his goal. Behind his success was his mother. His mother was not educated but encouraged and helped him to get education. And he was Haji Ali Shah from Harangus Thalay. Then he struggled to spread education in Thalay. Initially there was no school. And because of his struggle new educational institutions are founded rapidly. Nowadays there are following institutions;

- one higher secondary school
- Two High school
- 2 midel schools
- 4 primary schools
- Non-formal school
- 6 BECS schools ( working now)

Total= 15

== Infrastructure ==
- BHU

(at Harangus)

- Fruit nursery (agriculture department)
- Post office
- Ration depot
- Hydle (power) station (Daltir)
- Hydle station phase I (Parangus)
- Hydle station phase II (Baltoro)

== Health care ==
- Four first aid posts
- A class dispensary
- Veterinary dispensaryReferences (harangus)
- C class dispensary (Tagari)

== Nature resources ==
- 38 valleys for pasture
- Abundant water from glaciers
- Three Lakes
