= Kunais Valley =

Valley in Baltistan, Pakistan

Kunais Valley is a valley located in Ghanche District of Gilgit Baltistan in northern Pakistan. The valley consists of a number of small villages.
