= Thagus =

Thagus تھگس
- Union Council
- Thagas
- Motto: The Hub of Ancient Beads
- Location within Gilgit Baltistan Location within Pakistan
- Coordinates: 35.21293°N 76.46450°E
- Country: Pakistan
- State: Gilgit-Baltistan
- District: Ghanche
- Tehsil: Masherbrum
- Time zone: PST
  - Summer (DST): GMT+5
- Postal code: 16900

Thagus or Thagas (Urdu: تھگس, romanized: thagas) is a village and union council in Masherbrum Tehsil of Ghanche District of Gilgit Baltistan, Pakistan located 32 km (20 mi) from Khaplu in east. It lies on the bank of the Saltoro River just before it joins the Shyok River. Thagas is the administrative headquarters of Mashabrum subdivision of Ghanche District.

== History ==
Thagas is on the way from the centers of Baltistan, such as Skardu and Khaplu, to the Saltoro Pass, which was a traditional trade route to Kashgar. A mosque traditionally attributed to Shah-e-Hamadan is found at Thagas, which is said to have been built by him while on his way to Kashgar.
