= Dansam =

Mountain peak

- Location within Karakoram Location within Gilgit Baltistan

Highest point
- Elevation: 6,568 m (21,549 ft)
- Prominence: 1,226 m (4,022 ft)
- Coordinates: 35°14′29″N 76°48′32″E

Geography
- Location: Gilgit-Baltistan

Climbing
- First ascent: No records

Dansam (also known as K13) is a 6,568 m (21,549 ft) mountain peak in the west of the Saltoro Mountains, part of Karakorum Range.

== Location ==
Dansam is located in the disputed border region between the Pakistani territory of Gilgit-Baltistan (the former Northern Territories) and the Indian Kashmir region to the south-west of the Siachen Glacier. The mountain forms the highest peak of a ridge that runs between the river valleys of Kondus in the northwest and Dansam river in the south and east. The peak is located almost 24 km south-southwest of the Saltoro Kangri 7,742 m (25,400 ft), the highest point of the Saltoro Mountains, and 21 km west of the Chumik Kangri 6,754 m (22,159 ft), which is the dominance reference point. The prominence is 1,226 m (4,022 ft).

== Climbing history ==
No ascents of Dansam Peak are documented.
