= Hushe =

Hushe: ཧཱུཥེ; ہوشے
- Village
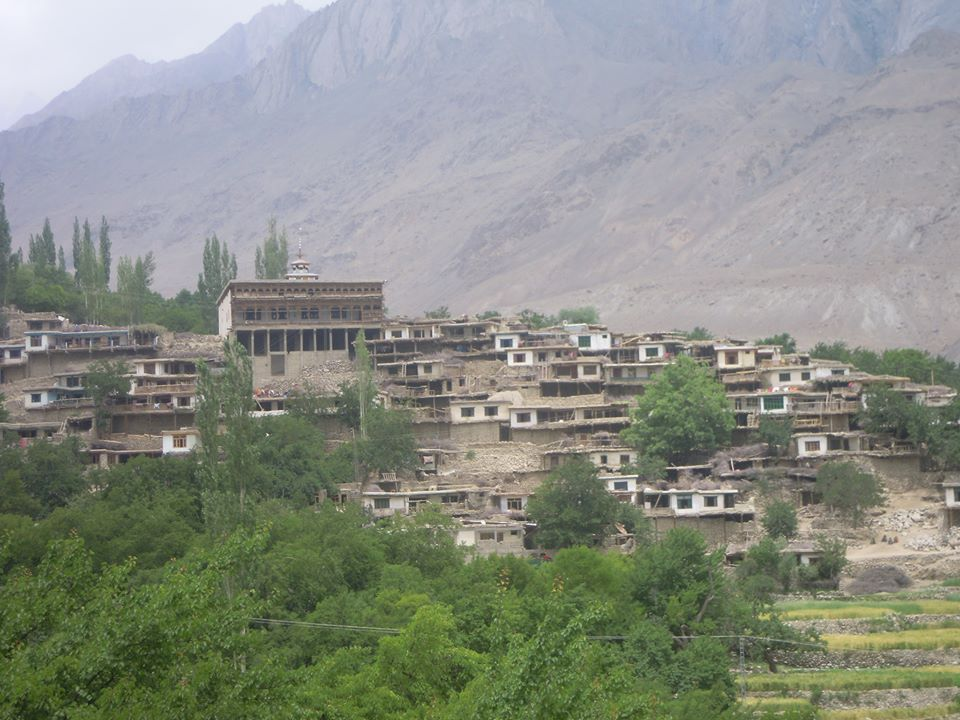
- Hushe village
- Interactive map of Hushe
- Location in Pakistan Hushe (Pakistan)
- Coordinates: 35°27′9″N 76°21′26″E
- Country: Pakistan
- State: Gilgit-Baltistan
- District: Ghanche
- Tehsil: Chorbat
- Union council: Machulo
- Elevation: 10,420 ft (3,180 m)

Population (1994)
  - Total: 931
- Time zone: UTC+5 (PST)

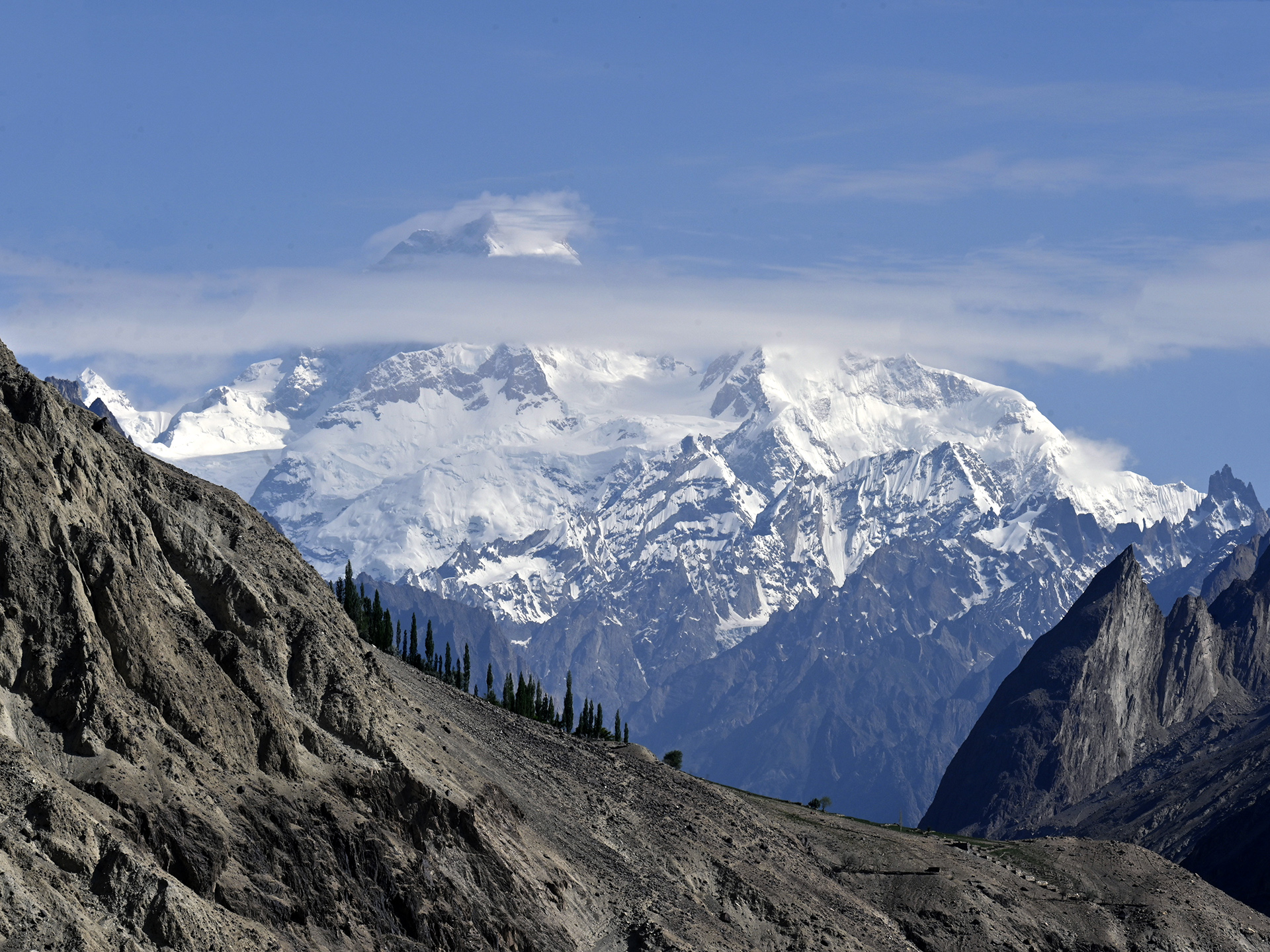
The south face of Masherbrum (7,821 m), formerly known as K1, as seen from the road leading to the village of Hushe in Gilgit–Baltistan, Pakistan.

Hushe (Balti: ཧཱུཥེ, romanized: Hūshe; Urdu: ہوشے) is the last village of the Ghangche District of Gilgit-Baltistan, Pakistan. It is the highest village in the once extremely remote and impoverished Hushe Valley.

== History ==
Hushe men began working as cooks and porters for mountaineering expeditions in the 1960s. Hushe is no longer the poorest of villages, as its popularity as a trekking and climbing destination continues to grow. Climbers and trekkers come all the way from Baltoro Glacier, Concordia and K2 via Gondogoro Pass, descend into Hushe village to reach Skardu District. Access to the Gasherbrums peaks is also possible going north up through Hushe Valley.

== Gallery ==
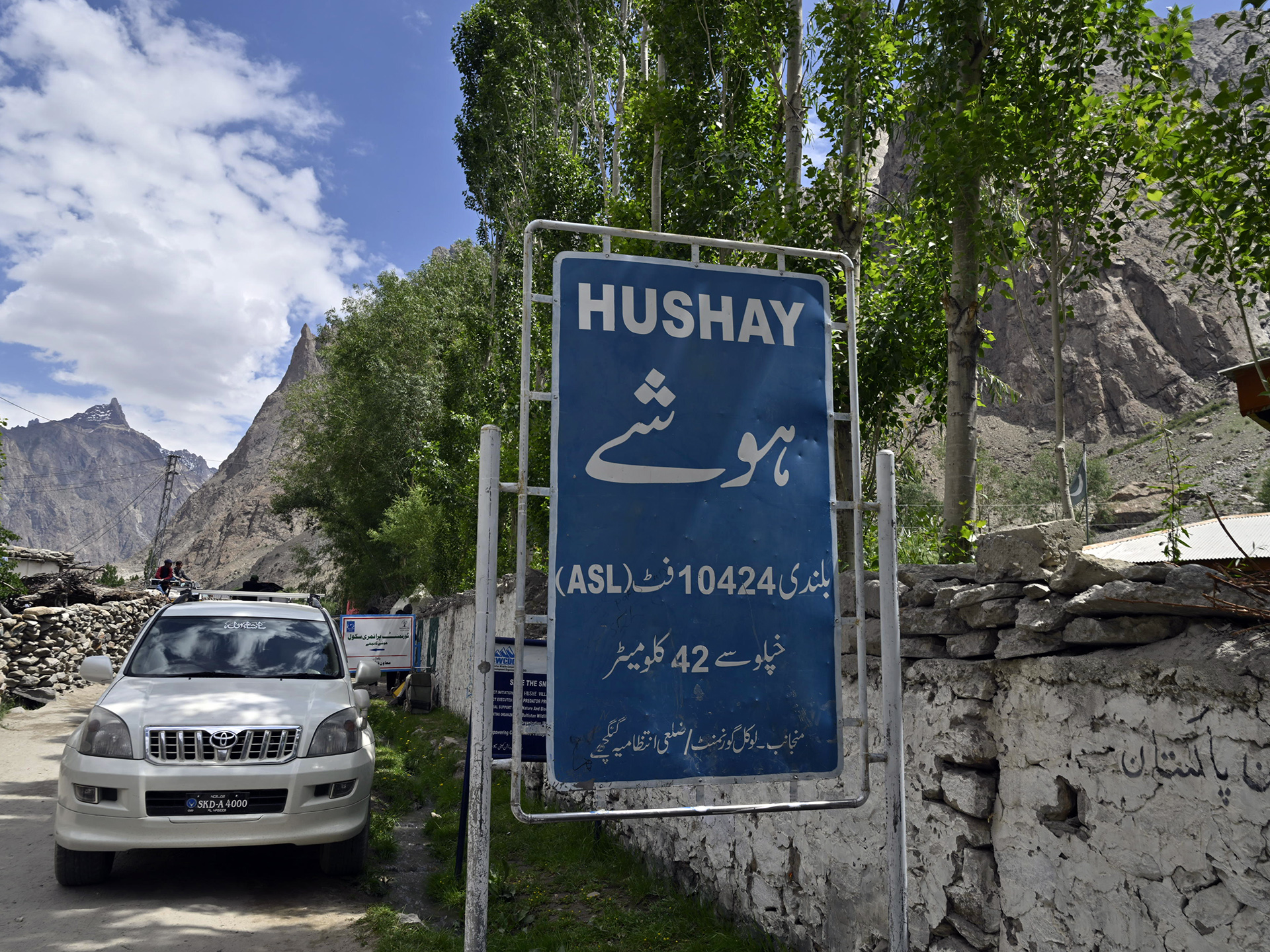
The village of Hushe, the last settlement on the road leading to Masherbrum in Gilgit-Baltistan, Pakistan.

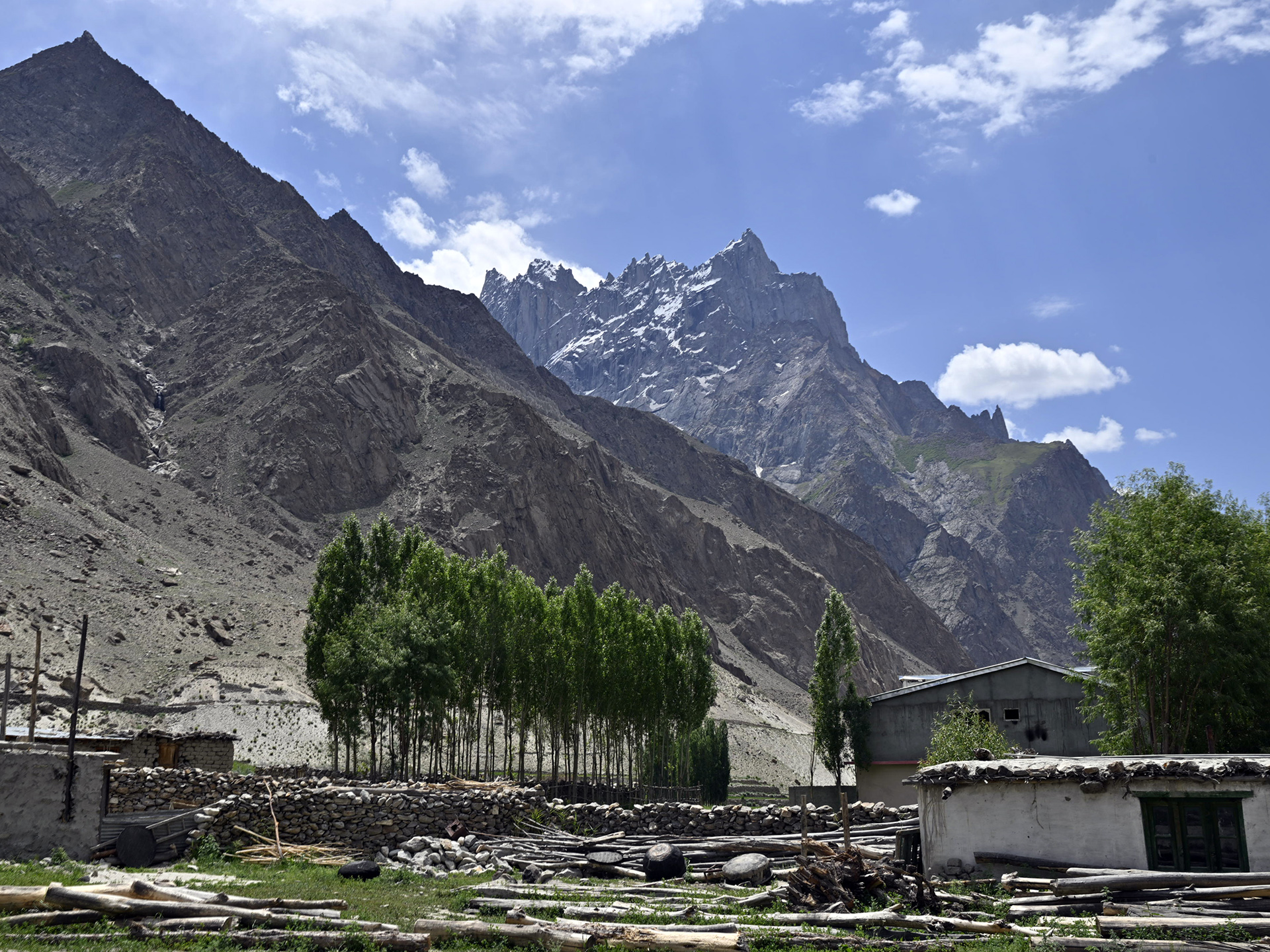
The village of Hushe, the last settlement on the road leading to Masherbrum in Gilgit-Baltistan, Pakistan.

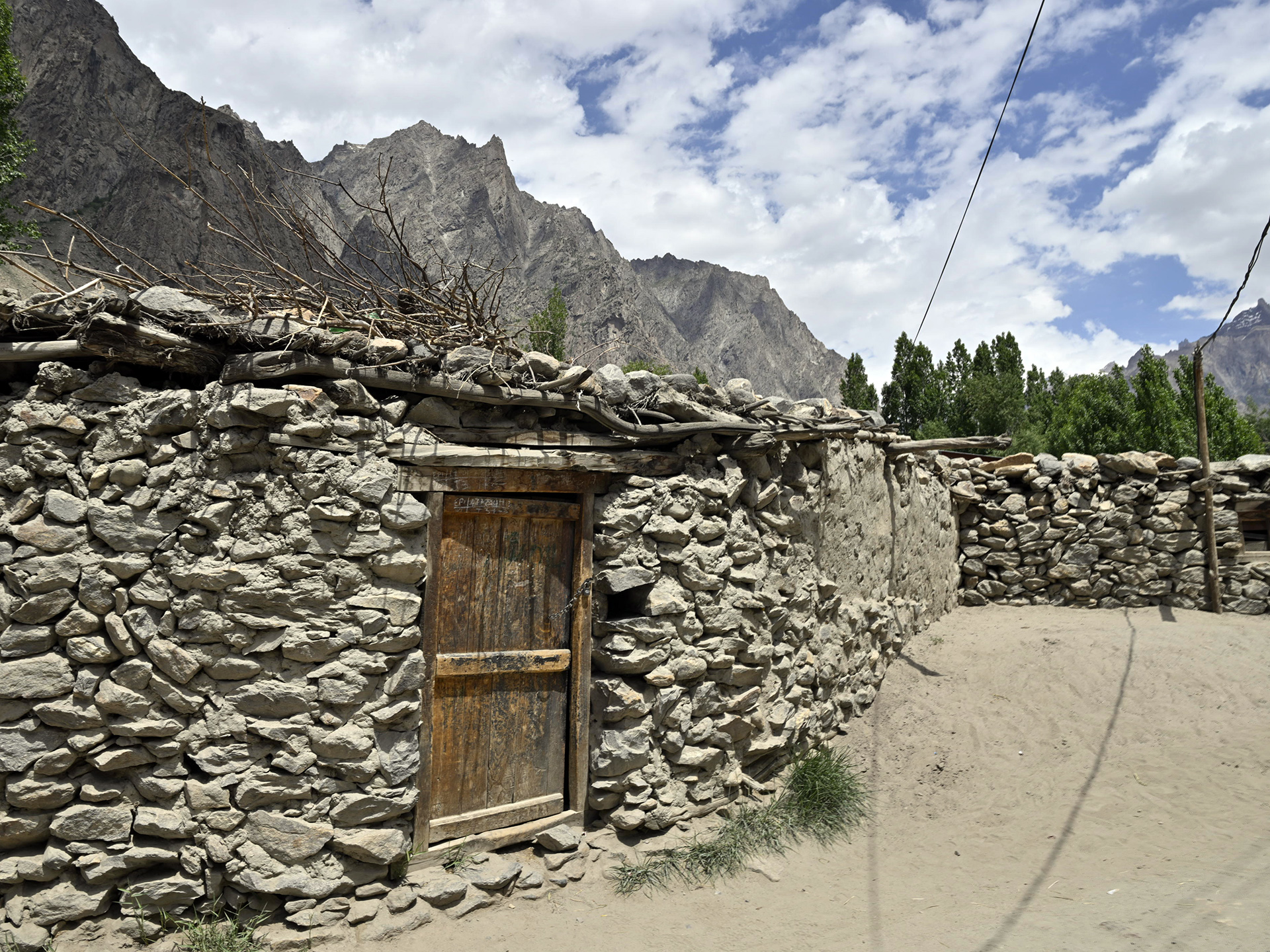
A house in the village of Hushe.

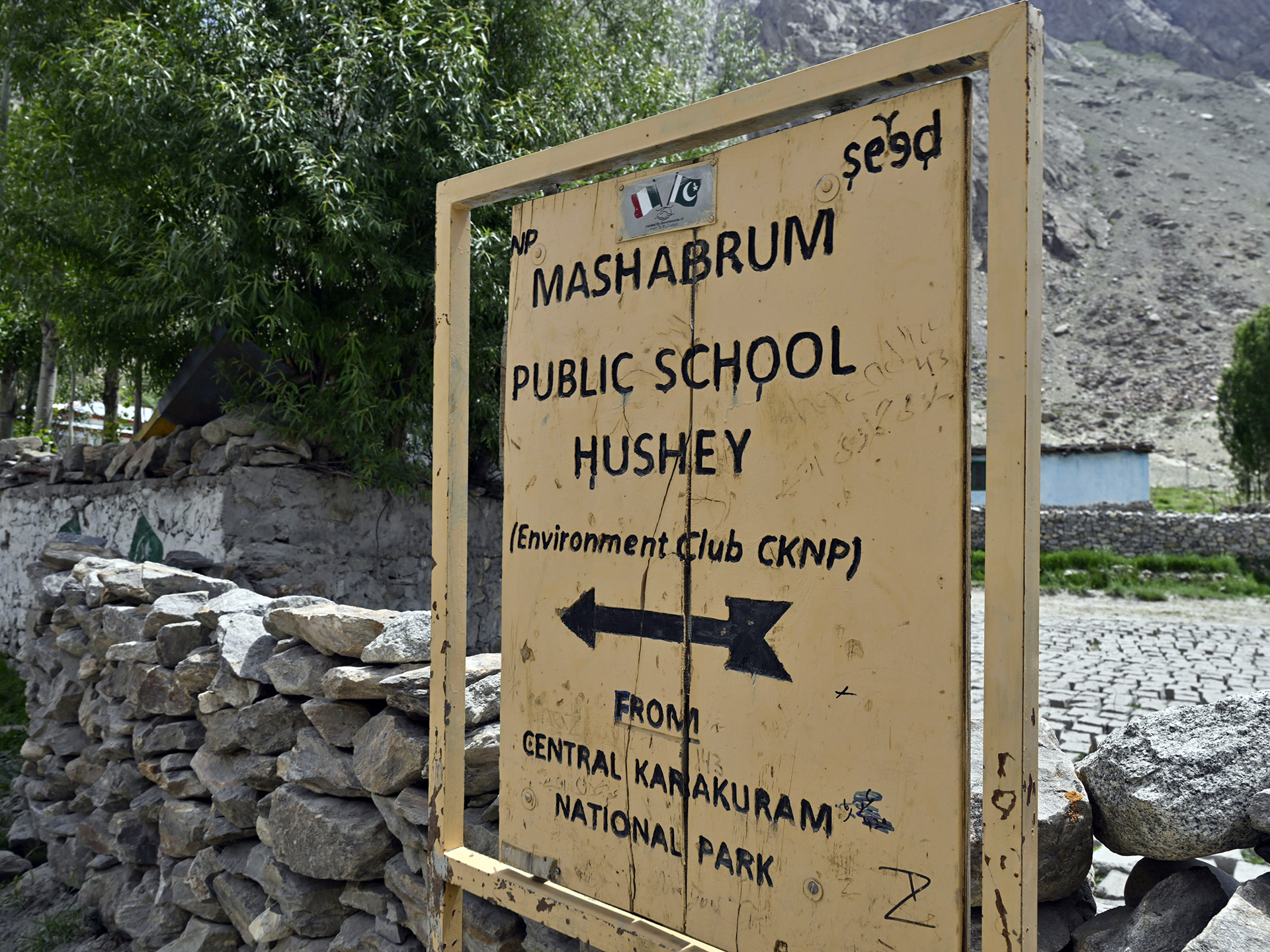
Signboard of the government school in Hushe.

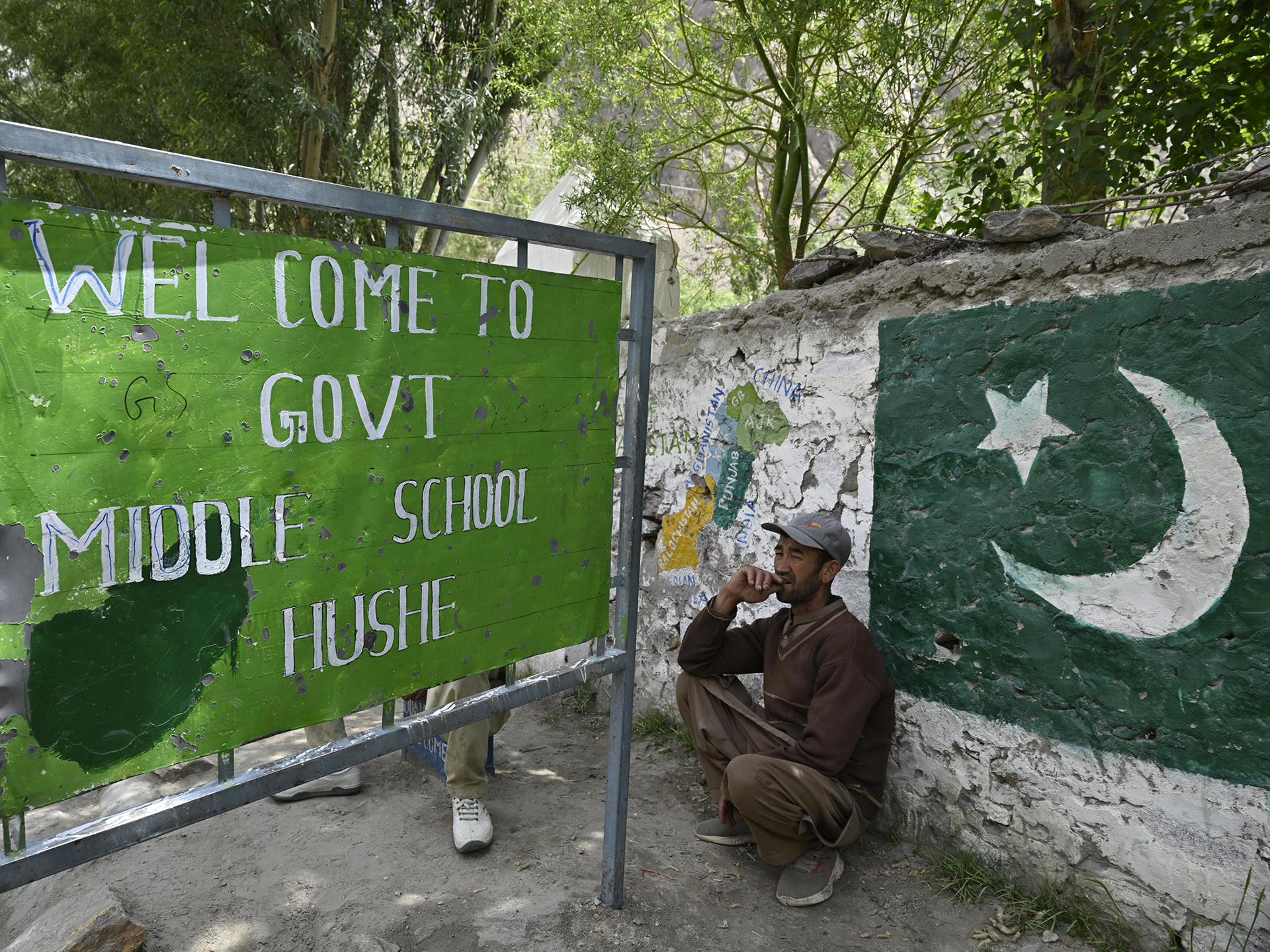
Signboard of the government school in Hushe.

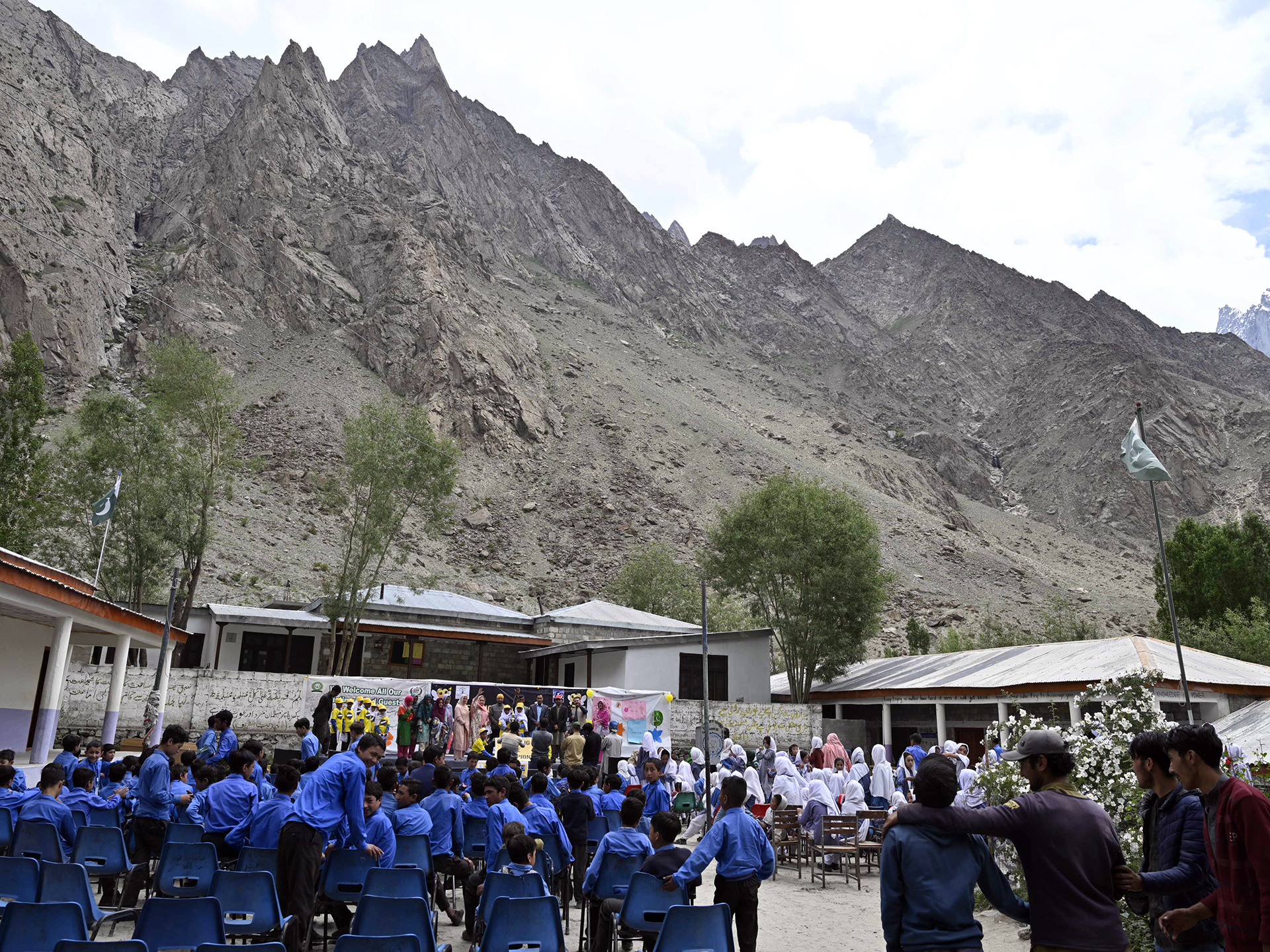
Government school in Hushe.

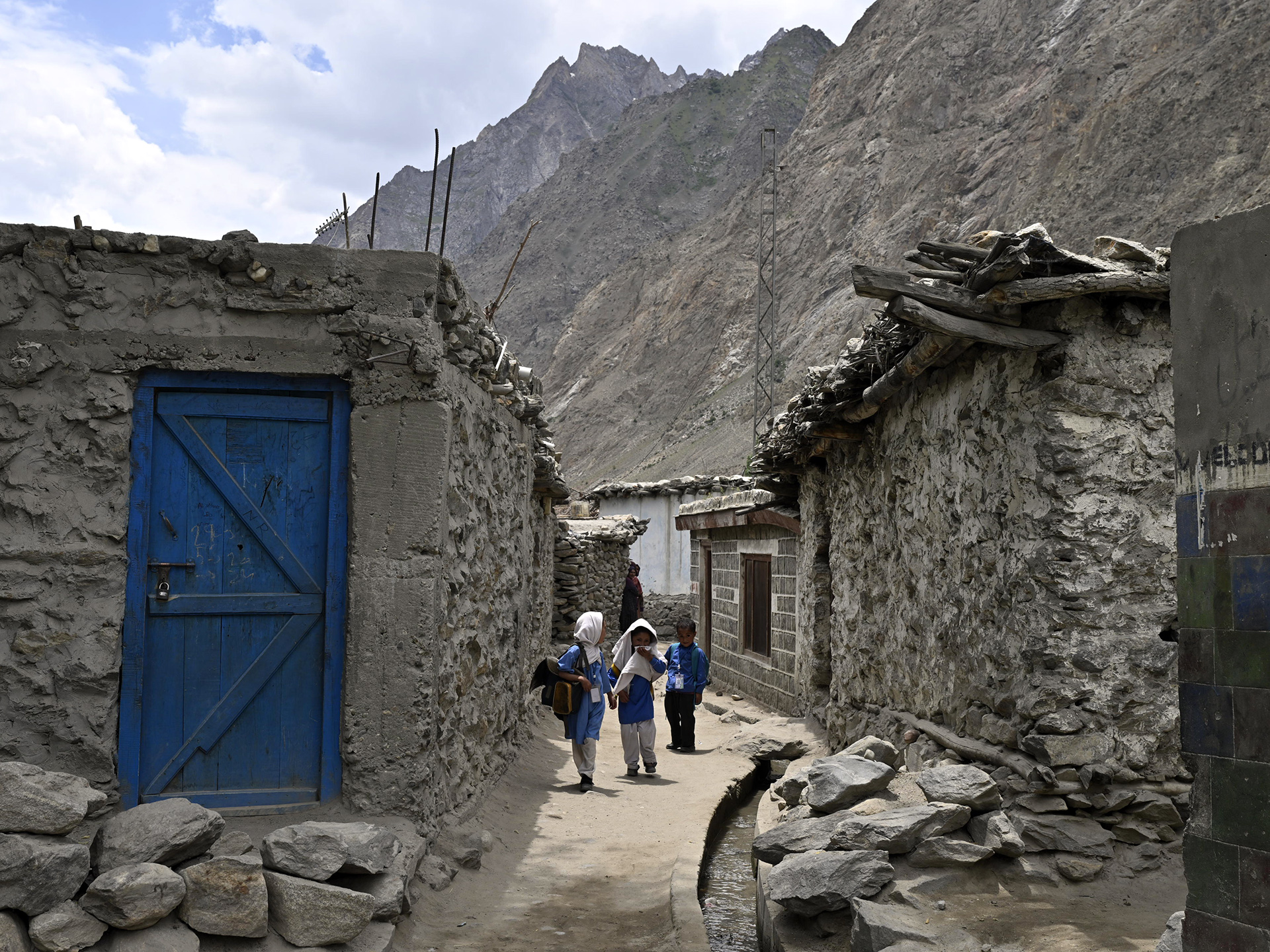
The village of Hushe.

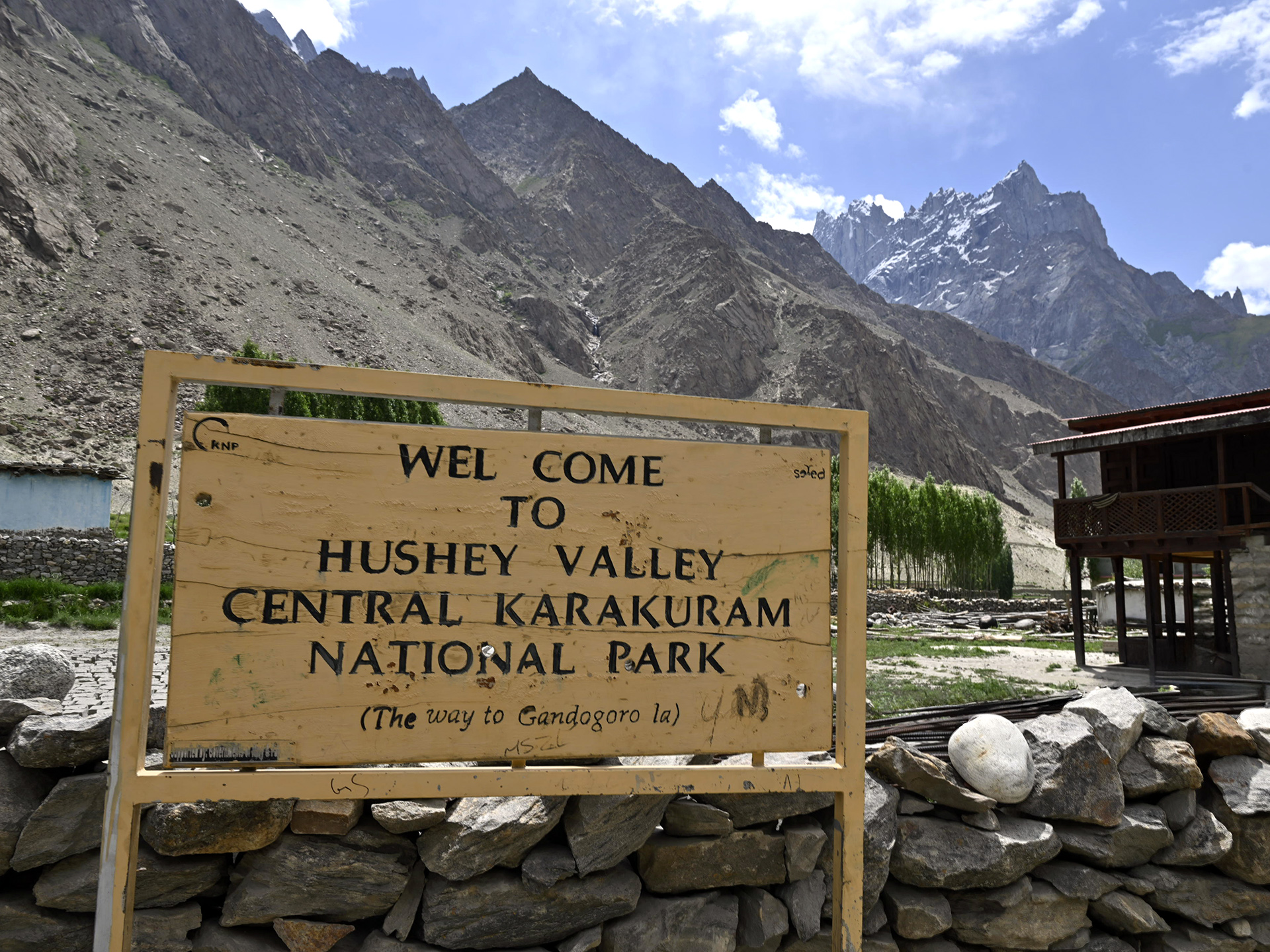
Signboard of the Hushe Valley – Central Karakoram National Park in the village of Hushe.
