= Kharkoo =

Village in Gilgit-Baltistan, Pakistan

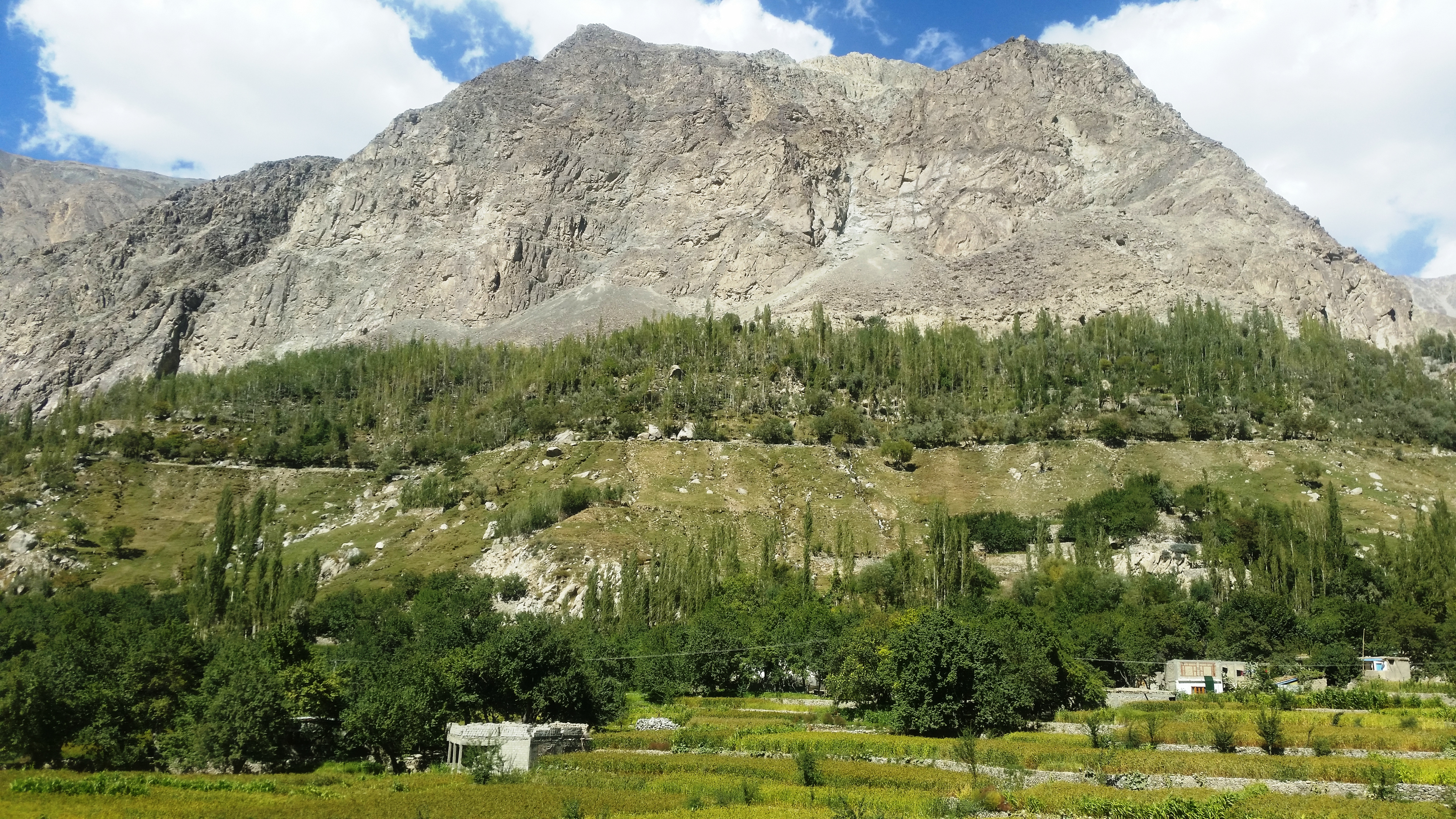

Kharkoo is a village on the right bank of Shyok River in Ghanche District of Gilgit-Baltistan, in northern Pakistan.
