= Barah Valley =

Valley in Gilgit Baltistan, Pakistan

Barah Valley وادی براہ
- Union Council
- Location in Pakistan
- Coordinates: 35.3297°N 76.4725°E
- Country: Pakistan
- Region: Gilgit-Baltistan
- District: Ghanche
- Elevation: 2,500 m (8,200 ft)

Languages
  - Official: Urdu
  - Local: Balti
- Time zone: UTC+5 (PST)
- Climate: Alpine
- Tourist attractions: Trekking, Hiking, Cultural festivals

The Barah Valley is a village in Gilgit Baltistan, Pakistan. Barah Valley is 100 km from Skardu in the east. The valley is located on the bank of Shyok river in the city of Khaplu, (Ghanche District) of Baltistan.

== Ethnography ==
The people are Balti and mostly belong to the Noorbakshia and Sunni sects of Islam.

=== Geography ===
Barah Valley lies at an elevation of approximately 2,500 meters above sea level. The valley is characterized by its rugged terrain and alpine climate, with cold winters and mild summers. The valley is accessible via a network of roads connecting it to Khaplu and other neighboring areas.

=== Climate ===
The climate in Barah Valley is predominantly alpine, with long, harsh winters and short, cool summers. During the winter months, the valley is often blanketed in snow, making transportation challenging.

=== Demographics ===
The population of Barah Valley is predominantly Balti, an ethnic group native to the region. The Balti people have a unique language, traditions, and customs. The main language spoken in the valley is Balti, a Tibetic language.

=== Economy ===
The economy of Barah Valley is primarily based on agriculture and livestock farming. The fertile soil and favorable climate allow the cultivation of various crops, including wheat, barley, and potatoes. Additionally, fruit orchards producing apples, apricots, and cherries are common in the valley. Livestock farming, particularly the rearing of yaks and sheep, is also a significant source of livelihood for the inhabitants.

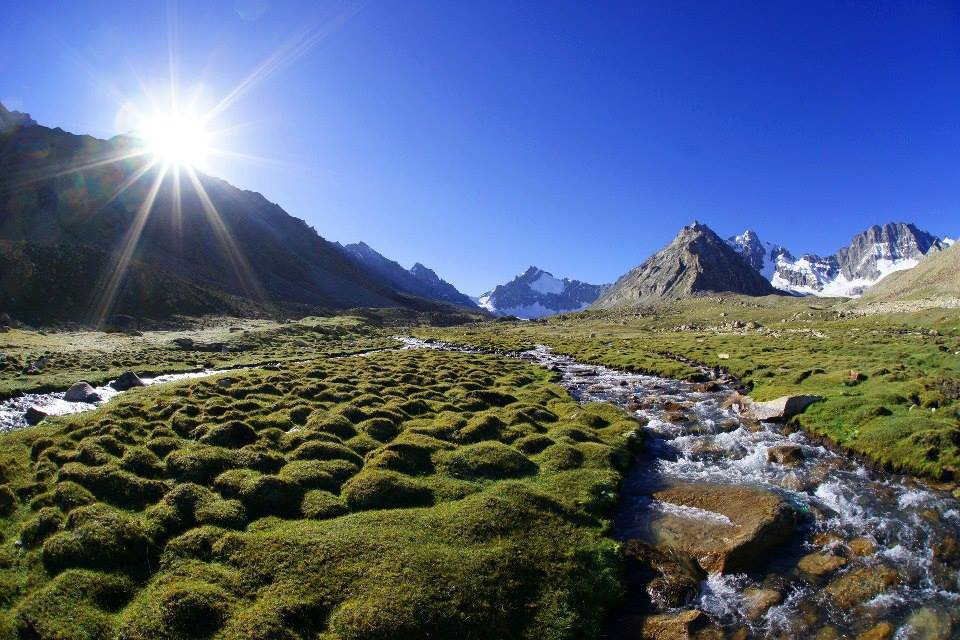

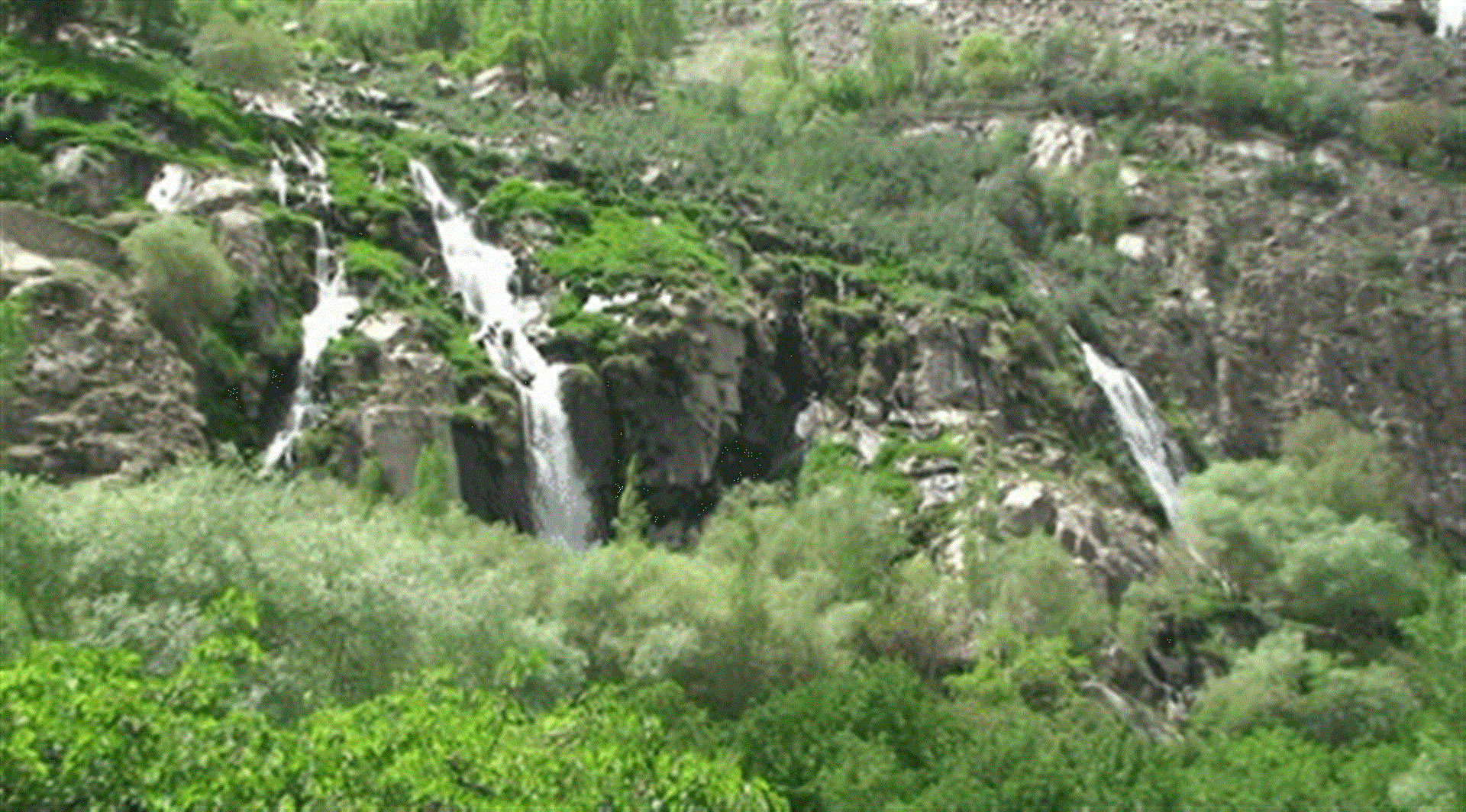

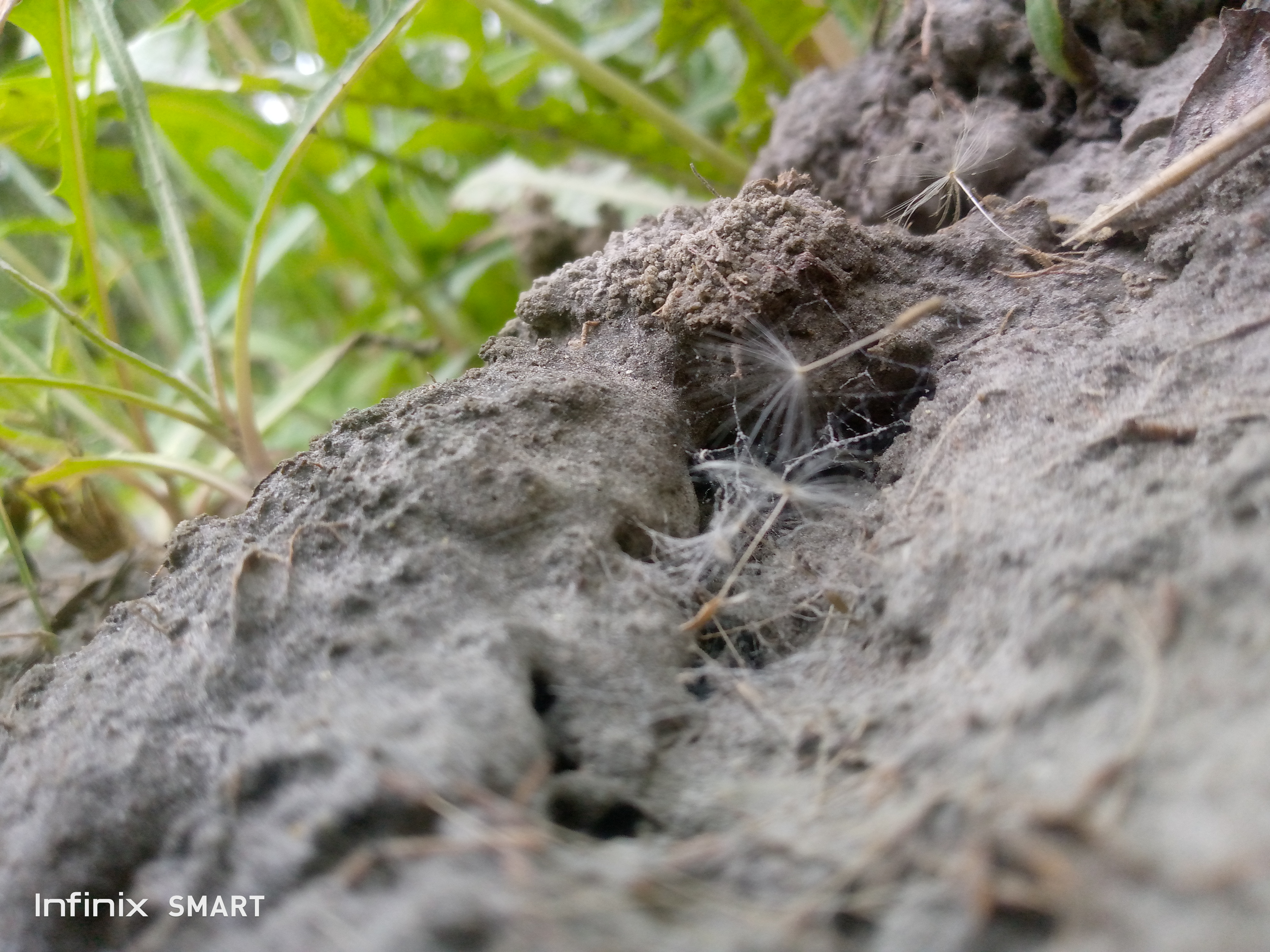
