= Surmo =

Surmo سرمو
- Village
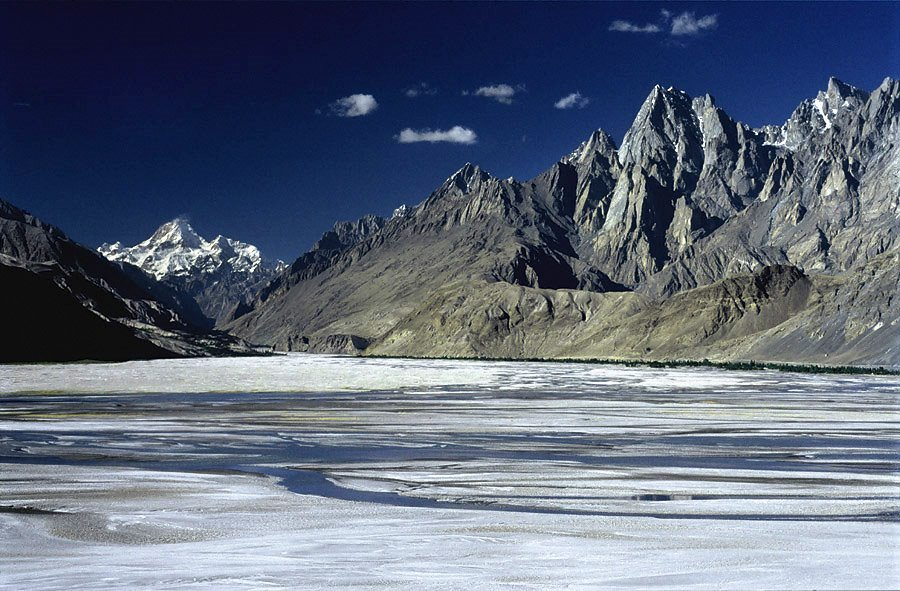
- The 7,821 m (25,659 ft) tall Masherbrum as viewed from Surmo

- Location in Pakistan
- Coordinates: 35°9′6.5181″N 76°26′43.6057″E
- Country: Pakistan
- Province: Gilgit Baltistan
- District: Ghanche
- Elevation: 8,532.50 ft (2,600.707 m)

Population
  - Total: 10,000
- Time zone: UTC+5 (PST)
  - Summer (DST): UTC+6 (GMT+6)
- Postal code: 16800

Surmo Valley (Urduوادی سرمو) is a valley in the Ghanche District in Gilgit–Baltistan, Pakistan. Etymologically, the name is derived from sermo: ser means gold and mo feminises the word.

== Location ==
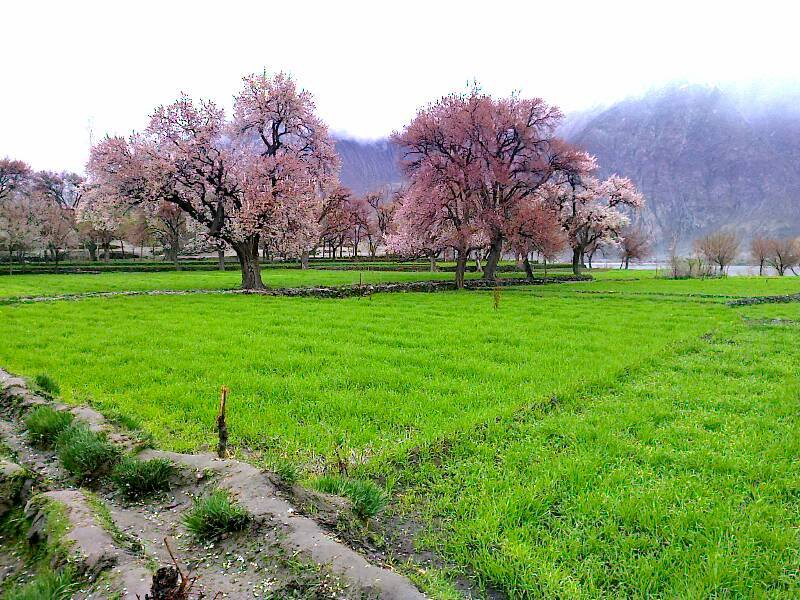
Surmo farm, November 2015

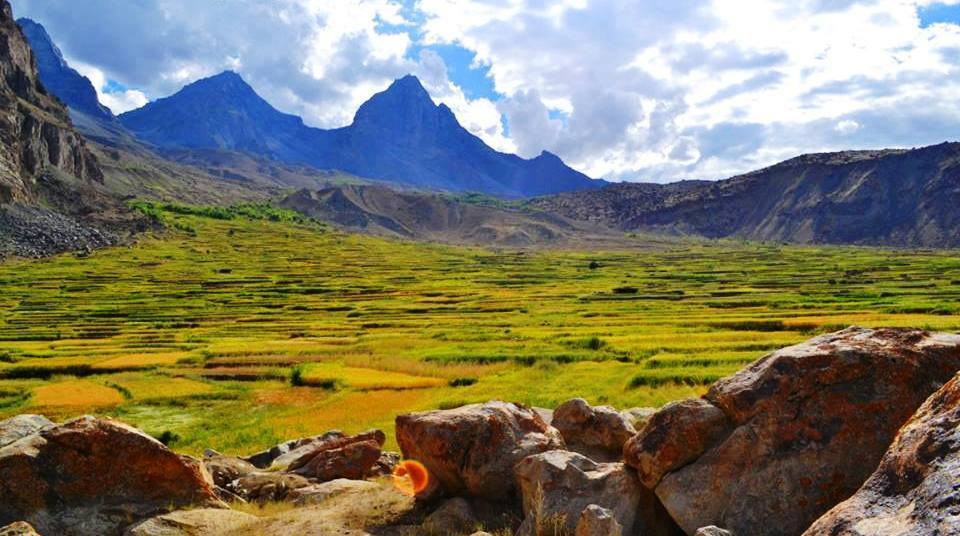
High terraced fields at Surmo Broq, May 2015

Surmo is approximately 12 kilometres (7.5 mi) from the district administrative capital of Khaplu. Its neighborhoods are Choghogrong, Tarkari, Khar, Gond, Langkhung, Tishari, and Ghazi-Thang. It is adjacent to the Shyok River.

== History ==
Surmo is one of the oldest valleys in Baltistan and contains 150-year-old walnut trees. In 1996, stupas were found here. Local people call this place Rgyalmo Khar (a queen's palace) as it had been a rich village.
