= Gulshan-e-Kabir =

Village in Pakistan

Coordinates: 35°12′N 76°31′E

Gulshan-e-Kabir is a village in Ghanche district of Gilgit-Baltistan in Pakistan. It is approximately 40 km from the city of Khaplu.

== History ==
The old name of Gulshan-e-Kabir is Pharawa but the still older name is Ralta Khonbu. Ralta Khonbu was known for beautiful lush green fields and meadows. The village was struck by a powerful flood from the mountains, resulting in the total devastation of Ralta Khonbu.

The surrounding villagers noticed that there was no trees or greenery left in Ralta Khonbu so they started calling it Phara ("bald" in Balti). Phara over time became Pharawa, a name the villagers never liked. Pharawa and Ralta Khonbu were equally used for a time but Pharawa dominated and was later registered in all the government records by the Dogra, so the name became a permanent identity.

In 1992 a group of youth from Pharawa residing in Karachi founded an organization by the name "Anjuman-e-Falah-o-Behbud" to rename the village. Different names, including the ancient name of Ralta Khonbu, were suggested, but finally they agreed on the name Gulshan-e-Ameer-e-Kabir, or Gulshan-e-Kabir for short, named after the Islamic saint and missionary from Iran, Ameer Kabir Syyed Ali Hamadni, whose preaching converted the villagers from Buddhism to Islam. The new name was warmly welcomed, and now the village in the middle of the mountains of Karakorum is known as Gulshan-e-Kabir (the garden of Kabir).

According to the history of Baltistan, Raja Ghori Tham had ruled here before 850 A.D. Ghori Tham was a powerful ruler of his time in Baltistan and Laddakh. His might can be imagined by the traces of his fort found on the top of a mountain situated in Gulshan-e-Kabir. No food or water was available near the fort and so they had to be carried there, down from the village through a special and secrete tunnel in the mountain. Ghori Tham used this fort for defense purposes in foreign invasions. This fort was almost impregnable to most invaders, as Ghori Tham stood at the top of the mountain and attacked his opponents with rocks rolling down the mountain.
