= Ghawari =

- Union Council
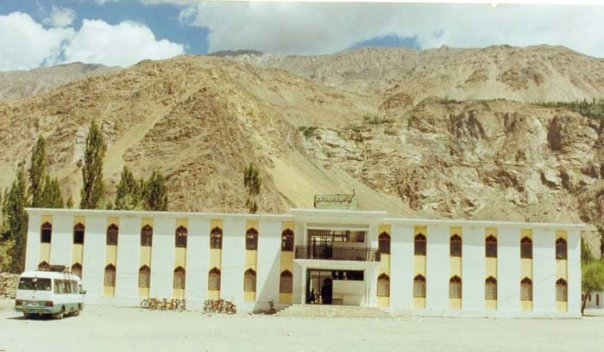
- Ghowari University

- Location in the Gilgit Baltistan region Ghawari (Pakistan)
- Coordinates: 35°11′1″N 76°03′33″E
- Country: Pakistan
- Region: Gilgit-Baltistan
- District: Ghanche
- Time zone: UTC+5 (PST)
  - Summer (DST): UTC+6 (GMT+6)

Ghawari (Note: Alternative spellings: Ghowari, Gowari, Oaree, Wali, and Gwali) is a union council and oasis in Ghanche District, Baltistan, Pakistan. It lies on the Shyok River about 14 miles (23 km) east of Sermik and 45.5 miles (73.2 km) southeast of Skardu. There is a suspension bridge over the Shyok in the southeast of the town which leads to Kuroo on the other side of the river. It is well known as a center of Islamic scholarship and learning and for its production of cherries and the associated Ghawari Cherry Festival, meant to highlight the importance of cherry farming to Baltistan.

== Demography ==
The population of Ghawari district at the end of the 19th century was 19,445 people. In 1951, Ghawari itself had a population of 1,691 people.
