= Balghar =

Historical village in Gilgit Baltistan, Pakistan

Balghar بلغار
- Balghar on Pakistan Map
- Coordinates: 35°15′1″N 76°11′41″E
- Country: Pakistan
- Province: Gilgit Baltistan
- Time zone: UTC+5 (PST)

Balghar (Urdu: بلغار وادی) is a village situated in Ghanche District, Gilgit Baltistan, Pakistan, along the banks of the Shyok River.

The confluence of the Shyok River and the Indus River occurs to the west of Balghar. Balghar encompasses 15 distinct neighborhoods (mahallahs), both large and small, namely Gond Balghar, Chan-Gond Balghar, Rotika, Ongbo, Marmyoung Balghar, Louhra Balghar, Khanka Grwong Balghar, Khorokha Balghar, Garippa Balghar, Krawathang Balghar, Khashu Balghar, Gamba Bordas Balghar, Younpawa Balghar, and Xooq Balghar. To the east lies the Daghoni Valley, while the Karis Valley is located to the west, Shiger Valley to the north, and Kharfaq Valley to the south.

Balghar valley is 30 kilometers northwest of the district headquarters of Ghanche, and 110 kilometers from Skardu city. Balghar Valley is at an elevation of 2,635 meters above sea level and falls in a single cropping zone. The main occupation in the area is agriculture.

There are rock carvings (petroglyphs) and inscriptions near Balghar.

== Occupations ==
Farming and agriculture of common food crops like wheat is done in Gilgit Baltistan including this region.

== Natural resources ==
- 10 valleys for pasture
- Abundant water from glaciers (Thalay valley) and Balghar. Water from two natural springs (Gon Balghar & Khashu Balghar)
- Two lakes from (Hashuo brog Lagouynangjouing, Shagaran Ariyas).
