= Ghanche District =

Ghanche District ضلع گانچھے
- District of Gilgit-Baltistan administered by Pakistan
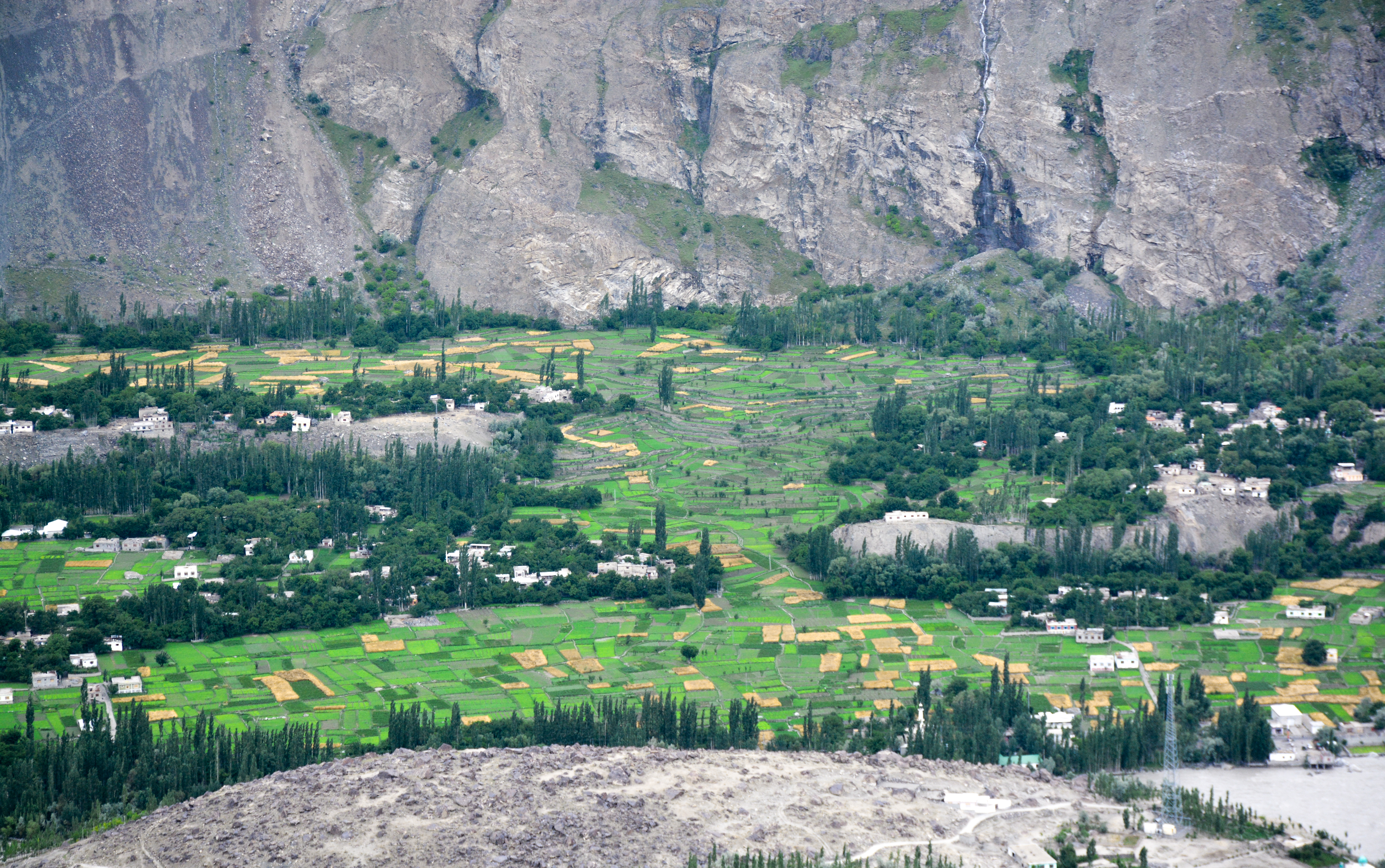
- View from Dongsa Rock at Kuro, Ghanche

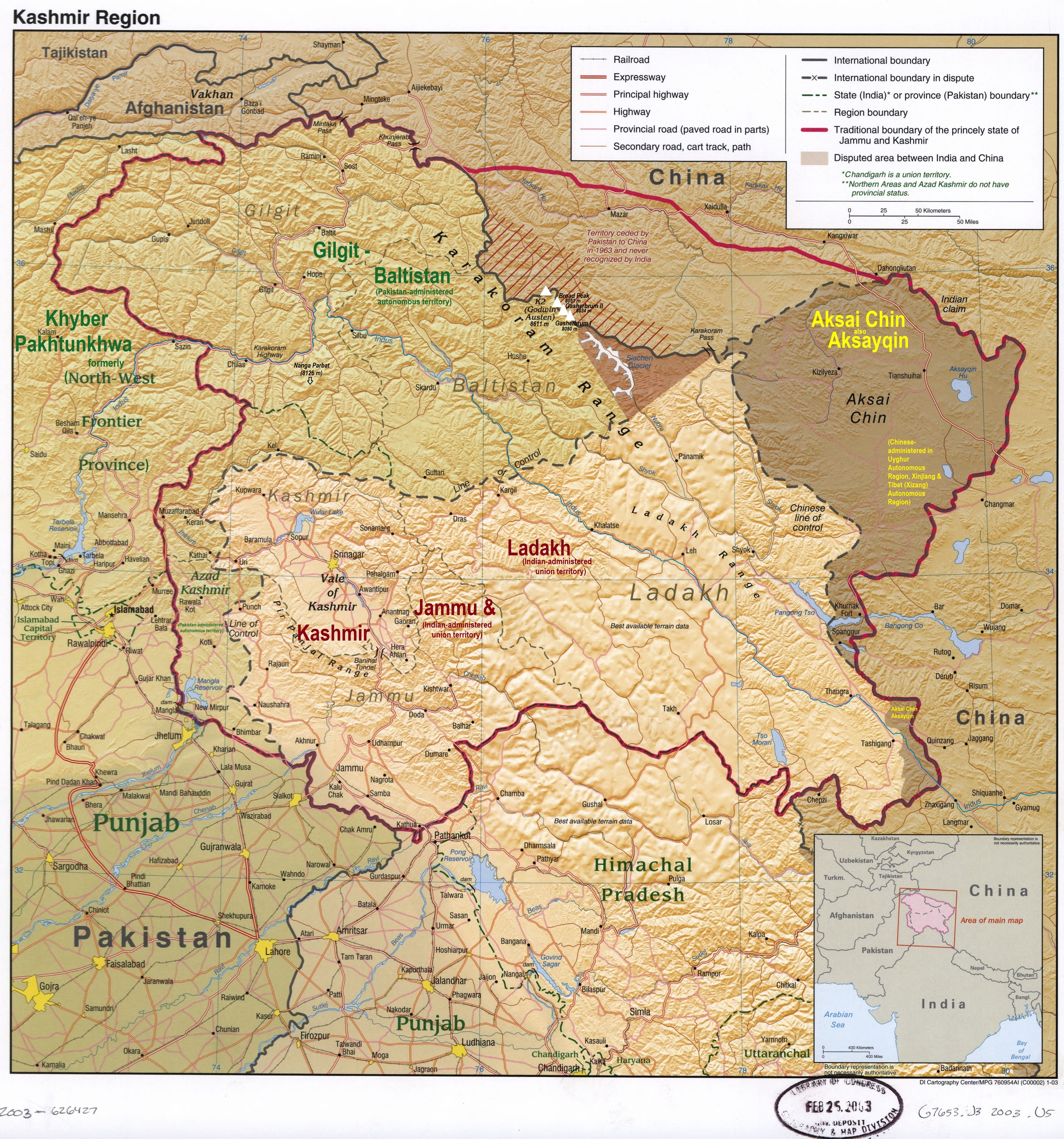
- Map showing Pakistani-administered Gilgit-Baltistan (shaded in sage green) in the disputed Kashmir region
- Interactive map of Ghanche District
- Coordinates: 35°10′N 76°20′E
- Territory: Gilgit-Baltistan
- Division: Baltistan Division
- Headquarters: Khaplu

Government
  - Type: District Administration
  - Deputy Commissioner: Umer Viqar (BPS-18 PAS)
  - District Police Officer: Nasir Ali Khan (BPS-18 PSP)

Area
  - Total: 8,531 km^{2} (3,294 sq mi)

Population (2023)
  - Total: 157,822
  - Density: 18.50/km^{2} (47.91/sq mi)
- Number of Tehsils: 6

Ghanche District (Urdu: ضلع گانچھے; Balti: ضلع گنگچھے, གངས་ཆེ) is a district of Pakistan-administered Gilgit-Baltistan in the disputed Kashmir region.

== Etymology ==
The word "gang" in the Balti language means glacier, and '"che" is used as a superlative term to indicate an abundance. The term is used by the residents of the Khaplu Valley for the Ghanche Nallah, a seasonal stream which flows through the town of Khaplu during the summer season. When the Pakistani government elevated the status of the Ghanche Tehsil to that of a district, the people of the valley selected the name "Ghanche".

== Geography ==
Map of Gilgit–Baltistan with the Ghanche District highlighted in red

It is the eastern-most district of Gilgit-Baltistan. It is the coldest place within Pakistan as it is situated on the so-called "third pole", with temperatures reaching below -20 °C in the winter. Shyok River flows through the Ghanche District. The Khaplu Valley and the Hushe Valley form the gateway for the great Baltoro Muztagh, the subrange of the Karakoram Mountains that includes the high peaks of K2 (8,611 m), Broad Peak (8,047 m), the Gasherbrums (8,000+ m) and Masherbrum (7,821 m). Overall less than half the area of district is covered by forests, and a major portion is permanently snow covered.

== History ==
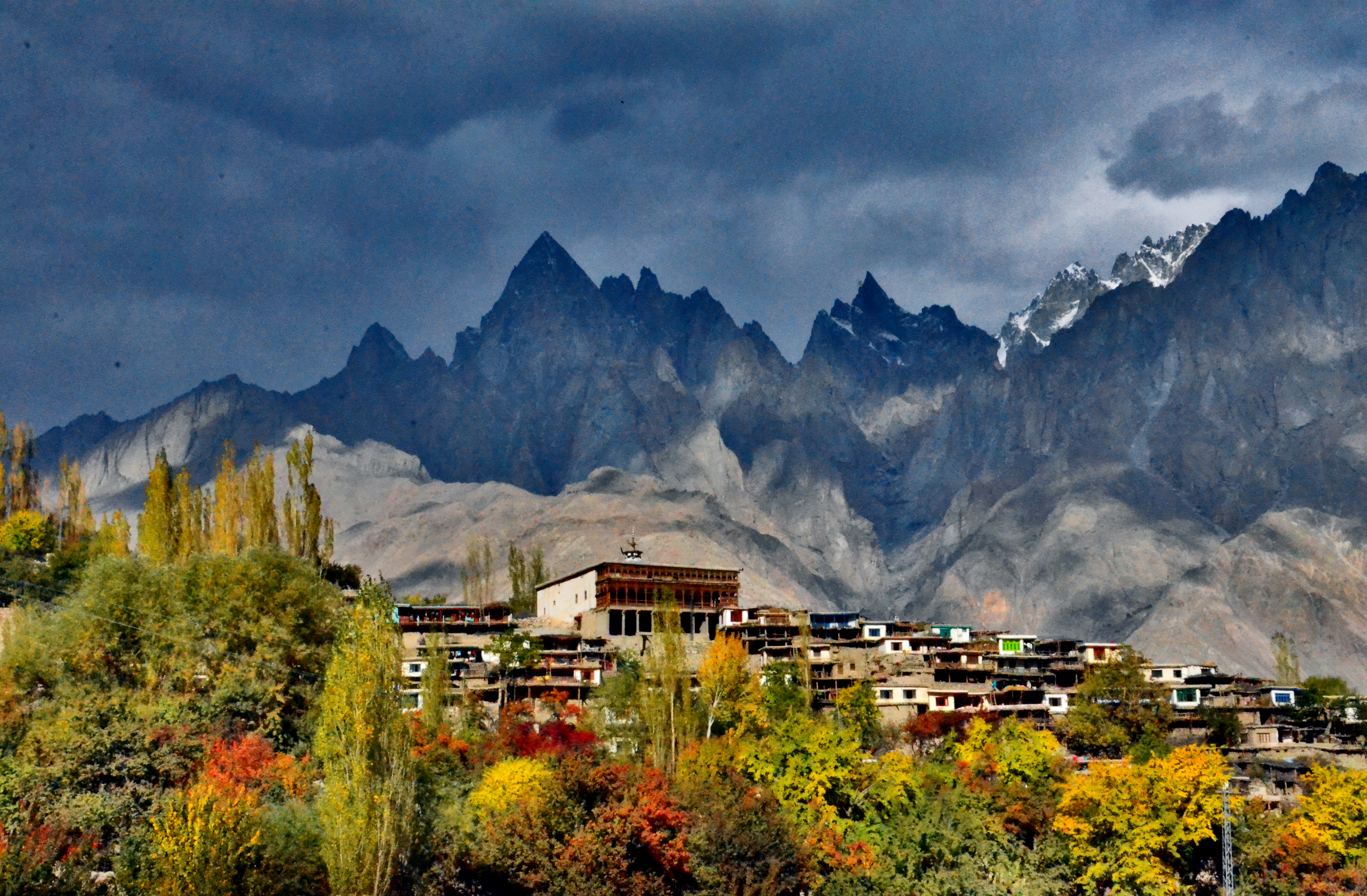
A mosque built in the typical style of the Baltistan in the village of Machlu

Until 1820 Ghanche was ruled by Yabghu dynasty, which had close relations with the Maqpon dynasty of Skardu. That year, Ahmad Shah of Skardu invaded and annexed Ghanche. In 1840, the Dogras invaded and conquer Ghanche. In the princely state of Jammu and Kashmir, established under British suzerainty in 1846, Ghanche was a part of Skardu tehsil of Ladakh Wazarat. Following 1947 Gilgit Rebellion it became a part of Pakistan along with rest of Baltistan. The Ghanche District was first established in 1974, but it was abolished sometimes later. It remained a part of Skardu District until 1989, when it was recreated and given District status.

== Administration ==
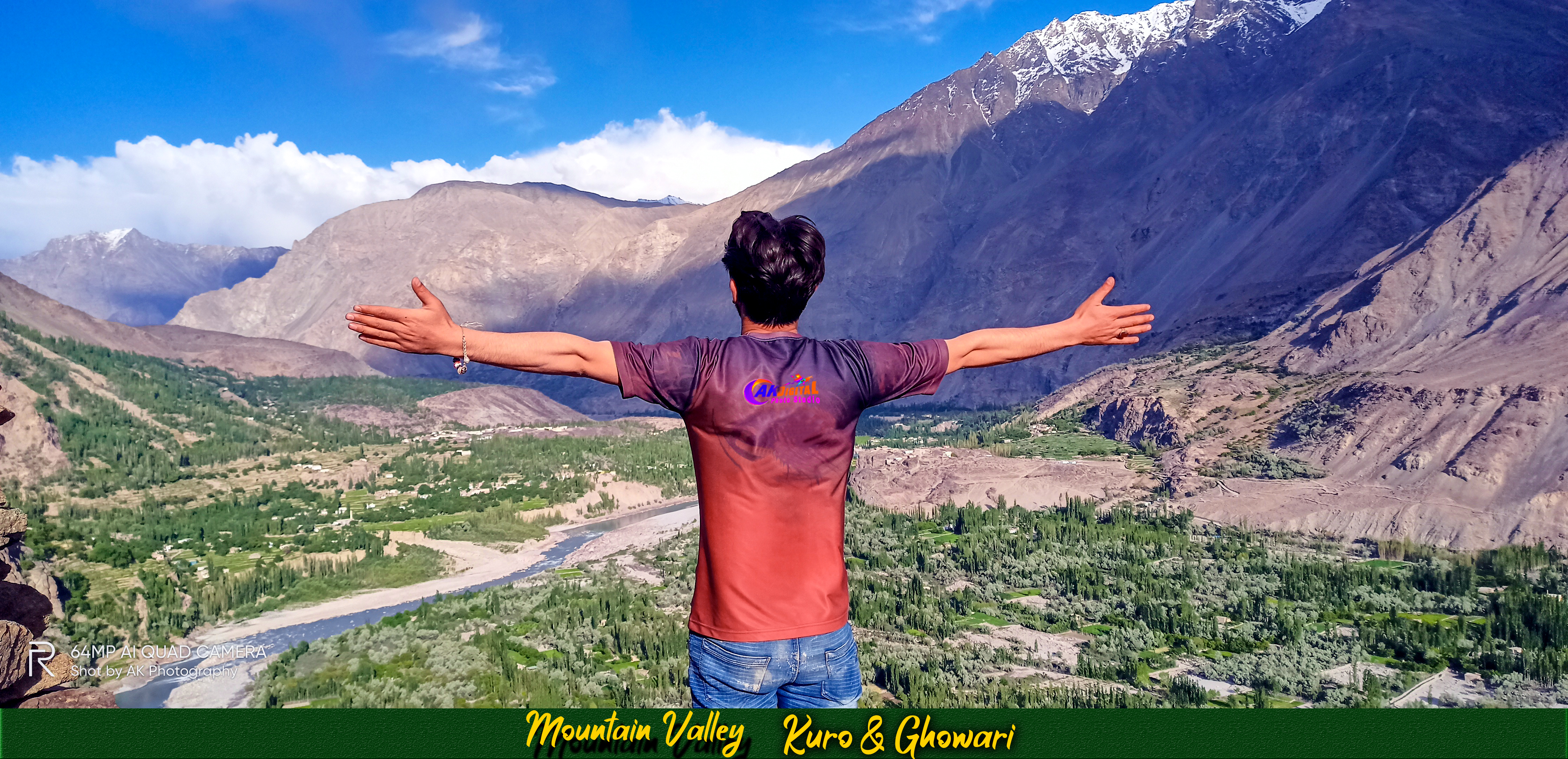
Kuro Valley near Khaplu

The Ghanche District is divided into six tehsils:

- Khaplu Tehsil
- Daghoni Tehsil
- Masherbrum Tehsil
- Chorbat Tehsil
- Ghowari Tehsil
- Keris Tehsil

The six tehsils are divided into 56 union councils, with each council containing several villages. Four villages of the Chorbat Valley were lost in the Indo-Pakistani War of 1971. Those were the villages of Chalunka, Thang, Turtuk, and Tyakshi. Some of them are given in the chart below.

Name of Village/Town	Muhallahs in the Village/Town
Keris	Oroba, Sumalsa, Kashiba, Sadat Colony, Barchong, Khargrong, Dangah, Youljuk, Charathang, Ural Gone, Banpa, Mustafaabad, Shagaran, Barchong
Gone	Gongma Grong, Gamba Grong
Kuro	Farool, Bahadurabad, Braqthoq, Khankah Grong, Gulshen Town Sato, Banigala, Gharaqpi Gond, Katchurdas, Khuramabad, Ldamxong, Airot
Ghowari	Ghulu Khor, Manjar, Sain (Hill Town), Chogo Grong, Shahoba, Zangi Ba, Manowa, Sobi Gon, Rahinpi Khor, Mala Abdul pi Khor, Mayokhor, Duskhor, Soq, Gintha
Yugo	Baqir Colony, Yogo
Daghoni	Malagrong, Baleeva, kharmang, Thagna, Shigalgrong, Chogogrong, Baktawa, Haiderabad
Kharkoo	Mandik, Arapa, Malayar, Thana Gamba Trangzong, Gongma Trangzong, Garbong, Youlskil, Piyara, Shopacholi, Lahar, Sogha
Balghar	Soq, Yompoya, Loda, Khankha Groing, Marmung, Gon, Chan Gon, Ungbo, Gongmayar, Bazawa, Khodakha, Garieppa, Kharwathaing, Khashou, Gamba Bardas
Barah	Gumba Bara (Hilfiyuoq, Kharfiyouq, Bara Gond, BrouqPa, Thupori), Gungma Bara (Spinpa, Sampa, MantholPa, Khanka, Pandiva, Darussalam, Mirikpa, Shourova, MominPa, QadeerPa, Tatous)
Khaplu Pain	Kraming, Malaliwa, Ansoq, Kongbozang, Gongmayar, Baqerpi Gund. Mekxerpi, Goqpi Mirpiser, Thaskong, Ghares, Morgoto, Helam Groung, Braqchan, Chaqchan, Mongrong, Beadenday, Hipi, Askari Gond, Chilabatigond, Kowakhong, Stronpi, Konowa, Khsergroung, Garboung
Khaplu Bala	Mouldomar, Sargaib, Stodkhoor (Braqchansar, Khansar, Banpi, Hundili Gharalti, Laxar), Khanqah, Naqzigroung, Gamba Bathong, Goma Bathong, Goma Staqji (Muhsinabad), Langkhong (Islamabad), Hatchhe Khar, Hatchhe, Dinis (Faizbaksh Sector), Gamba Bngriya, Goma Bngriya, Doqsa Garbochung
Saling	Banpi Gabkhore, Doqbar, Biliggrong, Sotol, Gond
Haldi	
Thagas	* Newti Chan, Olday Groung, Garbi Groung, Kharat, Arif Abad, Chansoq, Farol, Baqmacho, Kharkhor, Bandy Groung, Arappi Groung, Ool, Tholdi, Dung, Lhangkhani Groung
Chorbat	Siksa (Kalan, Sokhmos), Chowar, Siari, Piun, Hassanabad, Ameerabad, Dawoo, Marcha, Partook, Thoqmus, Frano
Gulshan-e-Kabir	Tranzong, Gonpon, Kharkhor (Kharkhor & Bongri), Farol (Gapkhor & Yarol)
Dumsum	Mallon, Gabser, Mongron, Khachepa, Yarkhor, Oling, Skoungoa, Barngmalla,
Ghursay	
Sino	Sino
Talis	Nima Bazar, Hussani Chock,
Saltoro	Mandik, Saith, Ghaglu and Goma
Surmo	Choghogrong, Tarkari, Tishari, Gond, Khar
Kundos	Karmanding, Gubla, Choghogrong, Telcho, bagey, shakhma, Lachat, Thang, Hano, Khorkondo, Farol,
Machulu	Ashurpi, Malikpi, Manthalpi, Khadi, Badawa, Hilbi, Mallon, Teshari, Marin, Bongri, Baqdurpi
Hushe	
Marzi Gon	
Thalay	Haltagari Baltoro, Daltir, Yarkhor, Taso, Harangus, Parangus, Chundu, Khasomik, Bordas, Gaworic, lodas.

== Religion ==
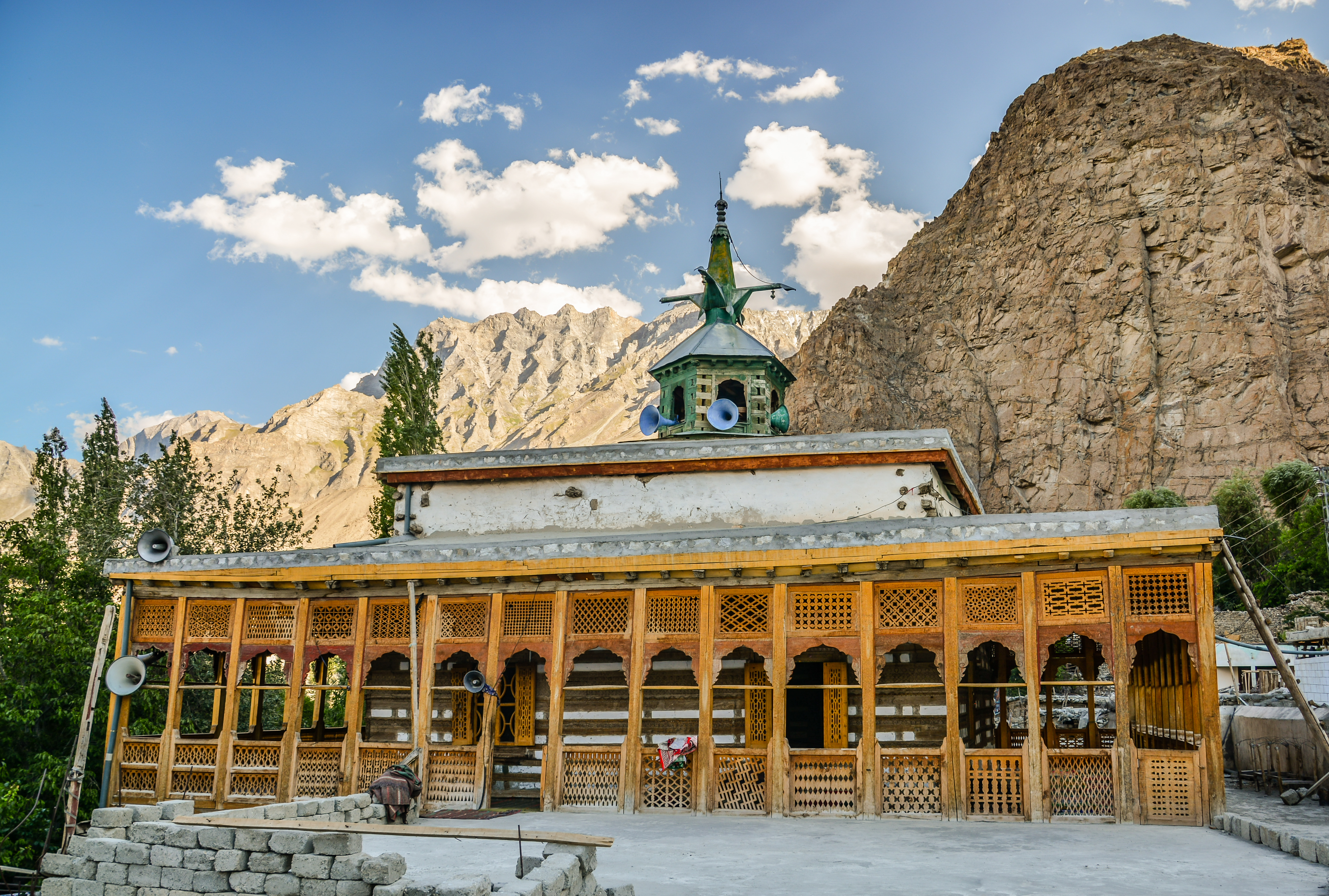
The Chaqchan Mosque, which dates to 1370 C.E., around the time that the district's inhabitants converted to Islam

The majority of the people living in Ghanche District belong to Noorbakshia sect, with the rest belonging to the Sunni and Shia sects. A religious leader locally called a "bowa" has a very important place in Ghanche society.

== Tourism ==
Ghanche is one of the most visited tourist destination in Pakistan. Famous places to visit in Ghanche are:

- Barah valley
- Chaqchan Mosque
- Hushe Valley (K2 Gateway)
- Thalay valley
- Yabgo palace Keris
- Aastana Mir Mukhtar Keris (Tomb)
- Balghar Ranga
- Crystal Lake Soga
- Dongsa Rock View Point Kuro
- Frano (Last village on the LOC)
- Gyari Yadgar e Shuhada
- Haldi Coneas
- Dumsum Valley
- Dumsum WaterFall
- Dumsum Rock Carving l
- Hot Spring Kondus
- Jerba So Keris (Lake)
- Keris Valley View Point (Chanma)
- Khashal Agri Tourism Park Ghowari
- Machulu Valley
- Mashbrum View Point
- Saling Spangtoq (Trout Fish)
- Thoqsi Khar Khaplu
- Yabgo Palace Khaplu (Sereena Palace)

== Education ==
According to the Alif Ailaan Pakistan District Education Rankings 2017, Ghanche is ranked 29th out of 141 districts in terms of education. For facilities and infrastructure, the district is ranked 118th out of 155.

== See also ==
- Districts of Gilgit–Baltistan
- Constituency GBLA-24
- 2012 Gayari Sector avalanche
- Noorbakhshia
- Saltoro Ridge
