= Hushe Valley =

Hushe Valley ཧཱུཥེ་ལུང་མ།
- Valley
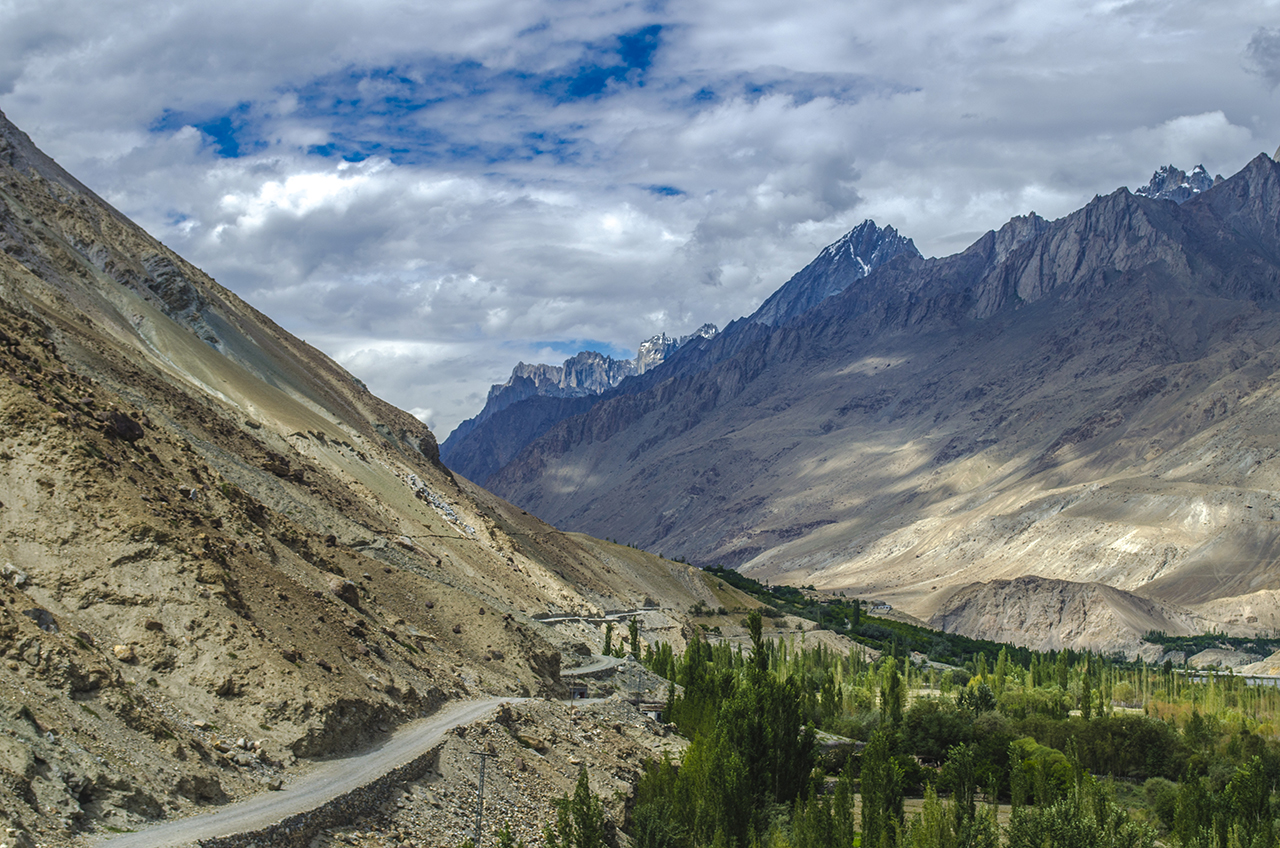
- Road in lower Hushe Valley

- Location in Pakistan
- Coordinates: 35°28′17″N 76°21′12″E
- Country: Pakistan
- Administrative unit: Gilgit-Baltistan
- District: Ghanche
- Time zone: UTC+5 (PST)
  - Summer (DST): UTC+6 (GMT+6)

Hushe Valley (Balti: ཧཱུཥེ་ལུང་མ།, romanized: Hūshe lung ma; Urdu: وادی ہوشے) is a valley in Ghanche District, Gilgit-Baltistan, Pakistan. Formed by the Hushe River, the valley runs from Masherbrum Mountain (at 7,821 meters) and nearby glaciers south to the Shyok River, opposite Khaplu. Hushe village lies in the center of the valley.

The valley is known for the surrounding high mountains of the Karakoram range, including several peaks above six thousand meters like Laila Peak, K6, and K7. Murtaza peak is 5,100 m just behind K6 base camp and is considered the epicenter of trekkers and beginners.

There are many sub-valleys in the area, including Gondogor (see Gondogoro Pass), Charkusa, Nagma, Nanbroq and Mashabrum.
