= Kondus Valley =

Valley in Ghanche District, Gilgit Baltistan

Kondus Valley وادی کندوس
- Union Council
- Location in Pakistan Kondus Valley (Pakistan)
- Coordinates: 35°15′N 76°40′E
- Administering country: Pakistan
- Autonomous territory: Gilgit Baltistan
- Baltistan division: Ghanche
- Elevation: 9,500 ft (2,900 m)

Population
  - Total: 10,000
- Time zone: UTC+5 (PST)
  - Summer (DST): UTC+6 (GMT+6)
- Postal code: 16800

Kondos Valley (Urdu: وادی کندوس) is a valley in the Masherbrum Tehsil of Ghanche District of Gilgit-Baltistan, Pakistan. It shares boundaries with China on the northern side and Indian-administered part of the disputed Kashmir region on the eastern side. It is 150 km from Skardu and 50 km from Khaplu with its population of approximately 10,000 people. It is located 9,500 feet above sea level.

The valley is approximately 162 km away from Skardu International Airport. The valley can be reached through Soltoro Road.

== History ==
Kondus Valley was part of the ancient kingdom of Baltistan, which was ruled by the Maqpon dynasty until the 19th century. In 1840, the region was subjugated by the Dogra rulers of Jammu under the suzerainty of the Sikh Empire. The valley was strategically important for trade and exploration, as it was connected to the Silk Road and the Siachen Glacier. Siachen Glacier has been a site of a military conflict between Pakistan and India since 1984. Due to this, Kondus Valley was closed to foreigners for 18 years, until it was reopened in 2002 with a special permit.

== Culture ==
The people of Kondus Valley are mostly Balti, who speak the Balti language, a Tibetan dialect. They celebrate various festivals and rituals throughout the year. The most prominent festival is the Nauroz, which marks the beginning of the new year and the spring season. The people also have a rich tradition of music, poetry, and art, which reflect their unique identity and heritage.

== Education ==
Kondus Valley is considered one of the most backward parts of Ghanche District. In the past, people were unable to get their education properly because of the lack of facilities and harsh environment of the valley. Due to this, Students of this valley used to go to nearby cities for higher education but now in recent years more government and private schools were built in the area.

== Geography ==
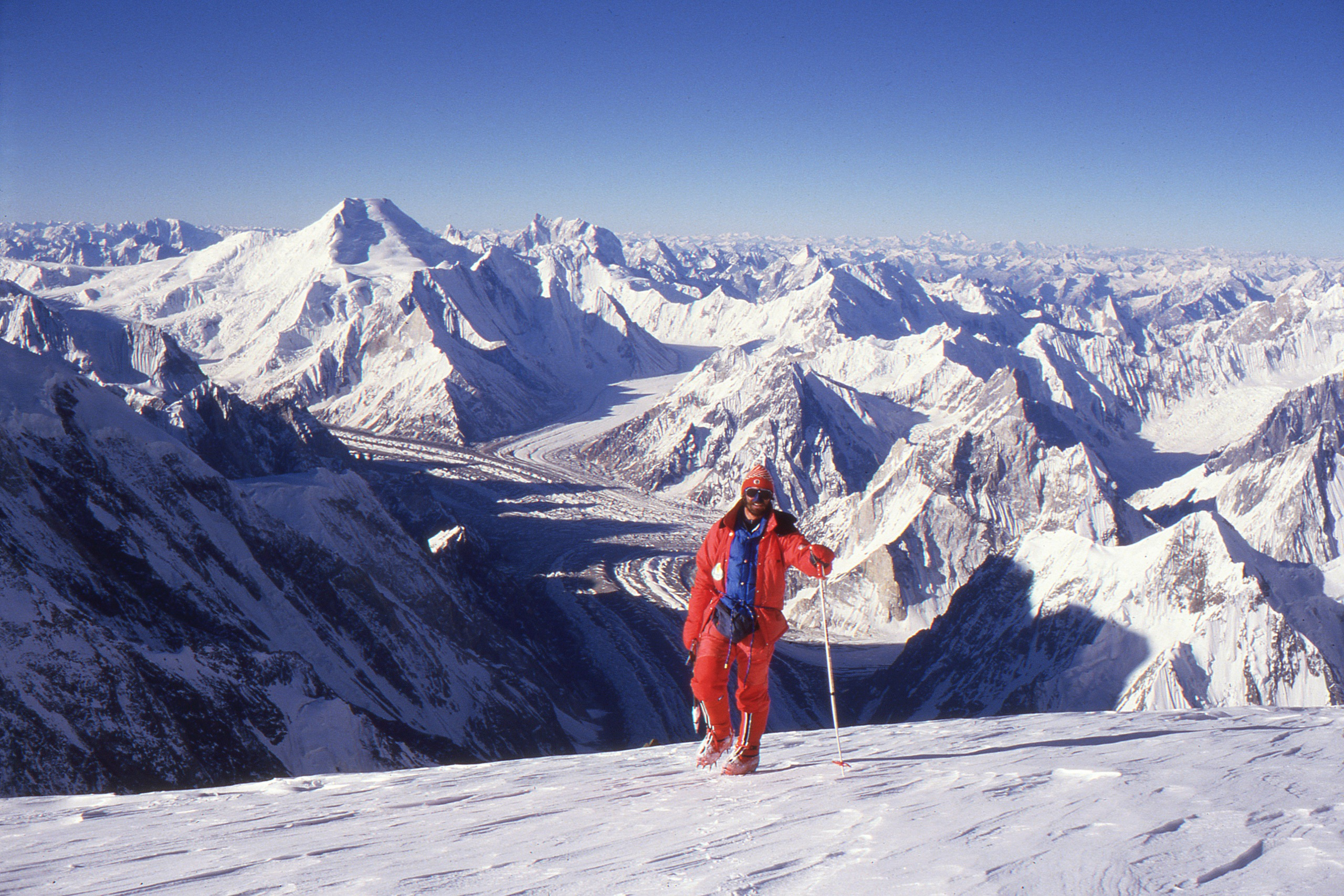
K6 is shown in the background of this photo, 21.7 km (13.5 miles) from Chogolisa. At the foot of Chogolisa is Vigne Glacier.

=== Khor Kondus ===
Khor Kondus is the main village of the valley, where the locals live in traditional mud houses and cultivate wheat and other crops. The village is surrounded by a forest of granite spires, and has a hot spring that is believed to have healing properties. It's considered as one of the last village of Pakistan near the boundary of the Indian-controlled part of the disputed Kashmir region. Six nearby villages to Khor Kondus are Lachat, Thang, Jaffarabad, Choghogron, Karmanding, and Khorkondo.

=== Rivers, Waterfalls and Hot springs ===
Two rivers run through the valley that are River Khorkondo and River Kayver which meet at the center known as Lobaha mor. In addition to rivers, There are many waterfalls and springs especially hot-spring of Khorkondo village is very famous. These waters are fed by melting snow of Siachin Glacier, Charakusa Glacier and the Kaberi Glacier.

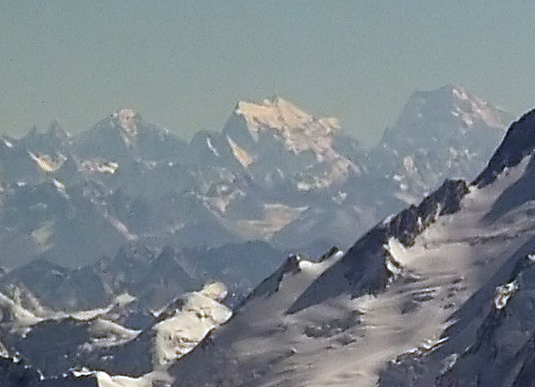
K6 (middle) and Saltoro Kangri (right) from the air in 2011

=== Mountain Peaks ===
Tahir Tower: A giant granite tower that was first climbed in 2000 by a team of American climbers. The tower is about 1,500 feet high, and has a challenging route that involves slabs, dihedrals, cracks, and offwidths. The tower is named after Brigadier Tahir, who helped the climbers get the special permit to enter the valley.

Dansam West: A 5,800-meter peak that was first ascended in 2018 by a team of French climbers. The peak has a striking shape, resembling a shark fin. The climbers named their route Harvest Moon, and described it as a mix of ice, snow, and rock climbing.

Saltoro Kangri I: This peak ranks as the 31st highest mountain globally and is about 7,742m high in elevation connected by a saddle with Saltoro Kangri II,

Chogolisa I: is one of the peaks of trapezoidal Chogolisa Mountain. This peak reaches an elevation of 7,665 meters.

Sherpi Kangri: is a mountain peak with an elevation of 7,380m. It lies Six km south of Ghent Kangri.

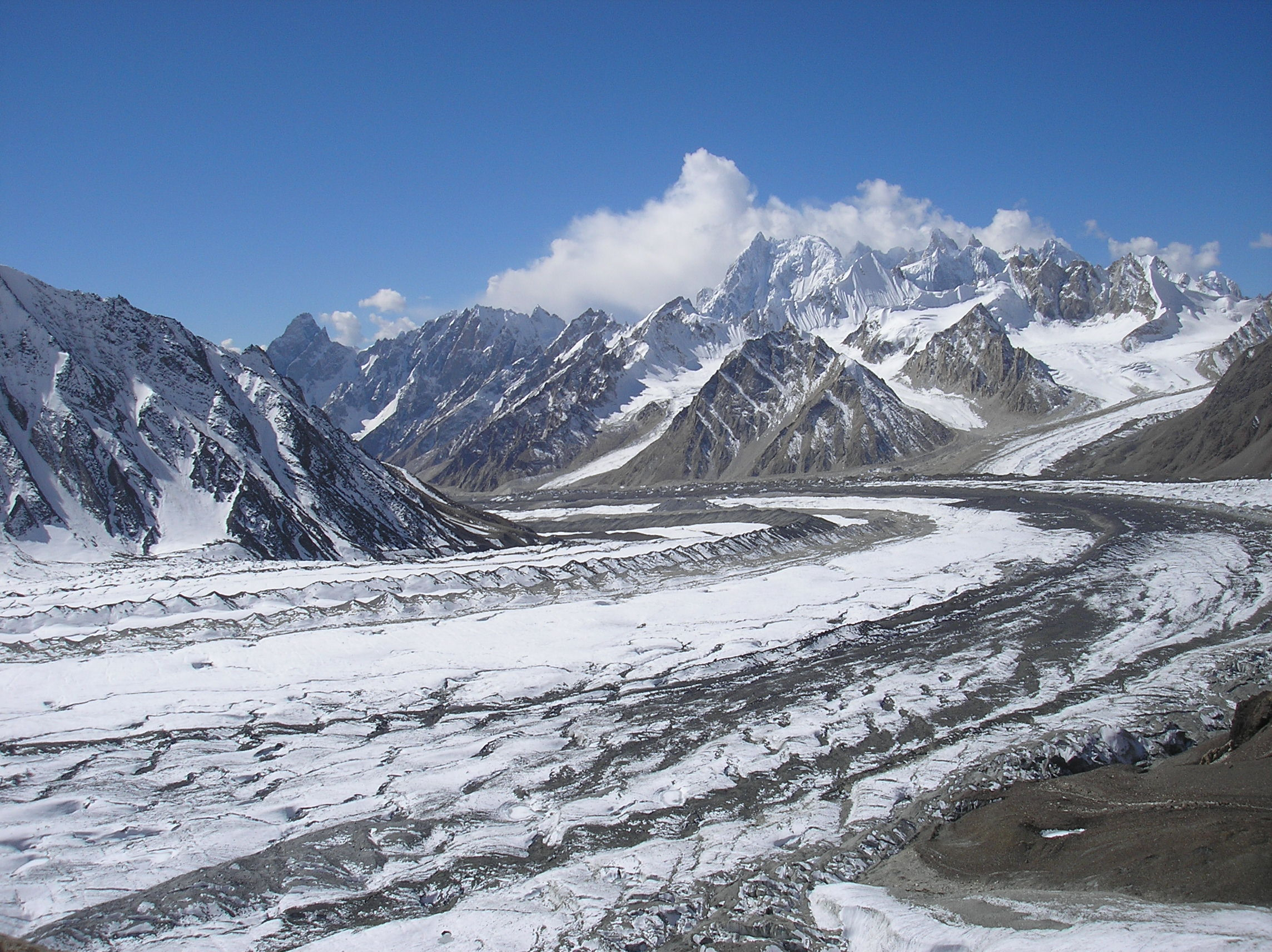
View of Link Sar (right of centre), K6 and K7 behind.

Link Sar: is a mountain located in between the head of the Charakusa Glacier and the Kaberi Glacier. The peak lies on a horseshoe which links K6 and K7 around the head of the Charakusa Glacier. Mountain is 7041m High.

K6: also known as Baltistan Peak is a notable peak of the valley as it is one of the smaller peaks compared to adjoining mountains. K6 has an elevation of 7280m. K6 has huge, steep faces, and great relief above the valley.

In addition to these peaks, several unnamed and unclimbed peaks also touch the Valley.
