= Keris Valley =

Keris Valley Kesari ཀེརིས་ལུང་མ།
- Union Council
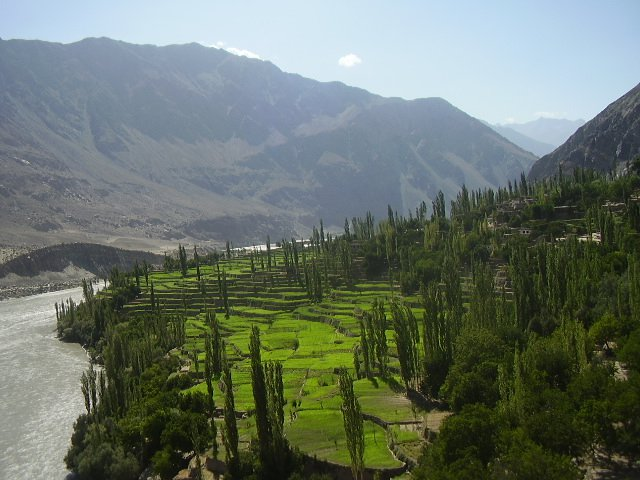

- Location in Gilgit-Baltistan
- Coordinates: 35°13′N 75°57′E
- Country: Pakistan
- Region: Gilgit-Baltistan
- Division: Baltistan
- District: Skardu, Ghanche District, Shigar and Kharmang
- Time zone: UTC+5:00 (PST)
- Postal code: 15100
- Official languages: Urdu and English (Official)
- Spoken languages: Balti; Lhasa Tibetan; Purgi

The Keris Valley (Balti: ཀེརིས་ལུང་མ།, romanized: keris lung ma) also spelled Kiris is a valley in Ghanche District of Baltiyul, Pakistan. It is located beside the Shyok River lying 39.3 km from Skardu in the east. The valley is at the confluence of the Indus River, and the Shingo River which passes through Kharmang after originating across the Line of Control in the Kargil region in Indian-administered Ladakh of the disputed Kashmir region.
