= Masherbrum =

Mountain in Gilgit-Baltistan, Pakistan

- K1
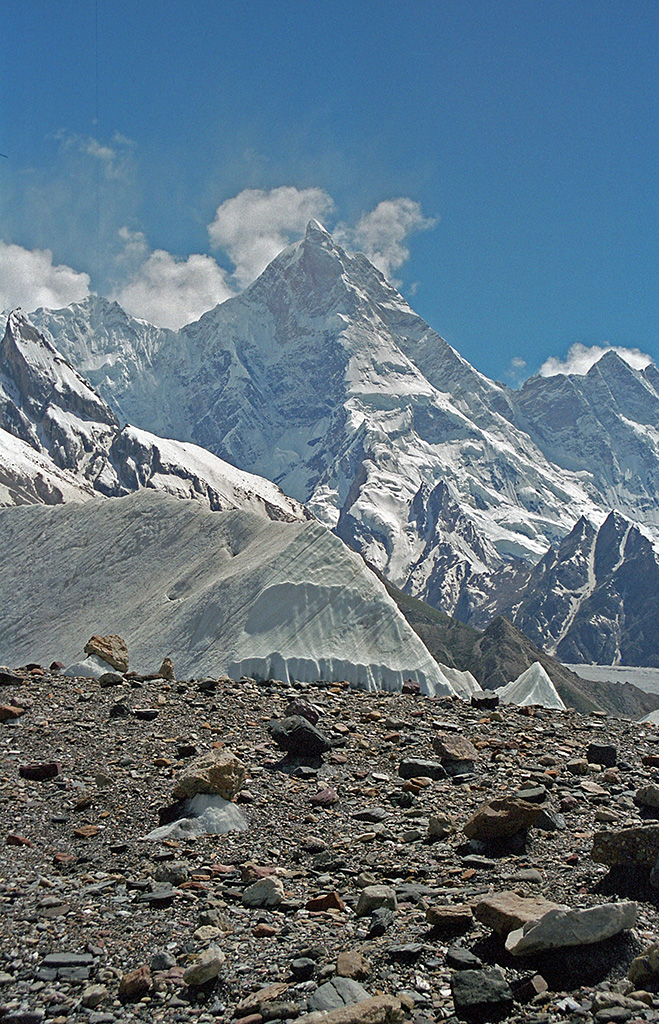
- Masherbrum, July 2004

Highest point
- Elevation: 7,821 m (25,659 ft); Ranked 22nd
- Prominence: 2,457 m (8,061 ft)
- Listing: Mountains of Pakistan; Ultra
- Coordinates: 35°38′24″N 76°18′21″E

Naming
- Native name: مشہ بروم (Urdu)

Geography
- Location within Pakistan Location within Gilgit Baltistan
- The major peaks in Karakoram are rank identified by height. Legend: 1：K2; 2：Gasherbrum I, K5; 3：Broad Peak; 4：Gasherbrum II, K4; 5：Gasherbrum III, K3a; 6：Gasherbrum IV, K3; 7：Distaghil Sar; 8：Kunyang Chhish; 9：Masherbrum, K1; 10：Batura Sar, Batura I; 11：Rakaposhi; 12：Batura II; 13：Kanjut Sar; 14：Saltoro Kangri, K10; 15：Batura III; 16： Saser Kangri I, K22; 17：Chogolisa; 18：Shispare; 19：Trivor Sar; 20：Skyang Kangri; 21：Mamostong Kangri, K35; 22：Saser Kangri II; 23：Saser Kangri III; 24：Pumari Chhish; 25：Passu Sar; 26：Yukshin Gardan Sar; 27：Teram Kangri I; 28：Malubiting; 29：K12; 30：Sia Kangri; 31：Momhil Sar; 32：Skil Brum; 33：Haramosh Peak; 34：Ghent Kangri; 35：Ultar Sar; 36：Rimo Massif; 37：Sherpi Kangri; 38：Yazghil Dome South; 39：Baltoro Kangri; 40：Crown Peak; 41：Baintha Brakk; 42：Yutmaru Sar; 43：K6; 44：Muztagh Tower; 45：Diran; 46：Apsarasas Kangri I; 47：Rimo III; 48：Gasherbrum V; Location in Gilgit-Baltistan
- Location: Gilgit-Baltistan, Pakistan
- Parent range: Karakoram

Climbing
- First ascent: 1960 by George Bell and Willi Unsoeld
- Easiest route: glacier/snow/ice climb

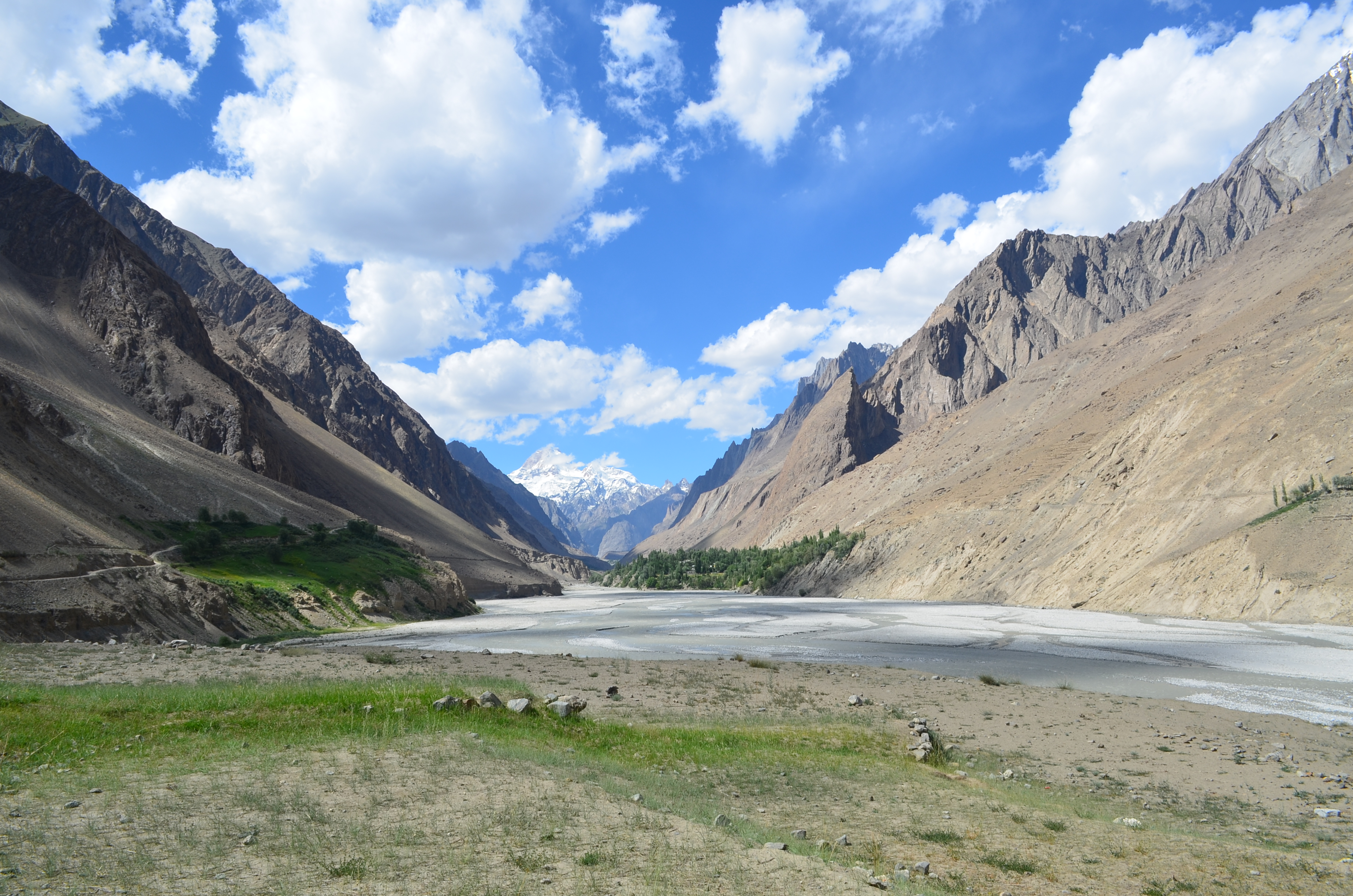
K1 Mountain, view from Talis

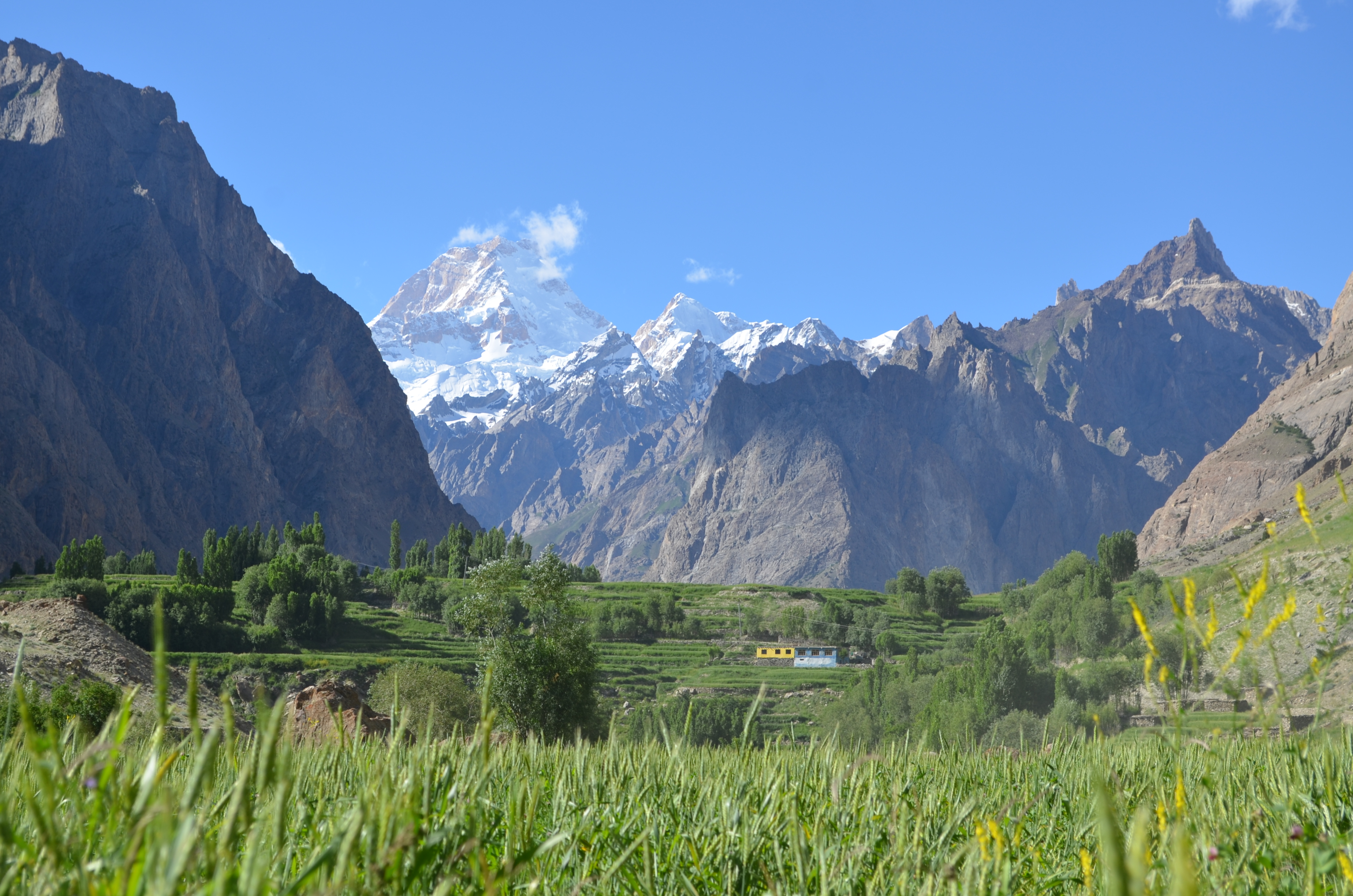
K1 Mountain, view from Hushe

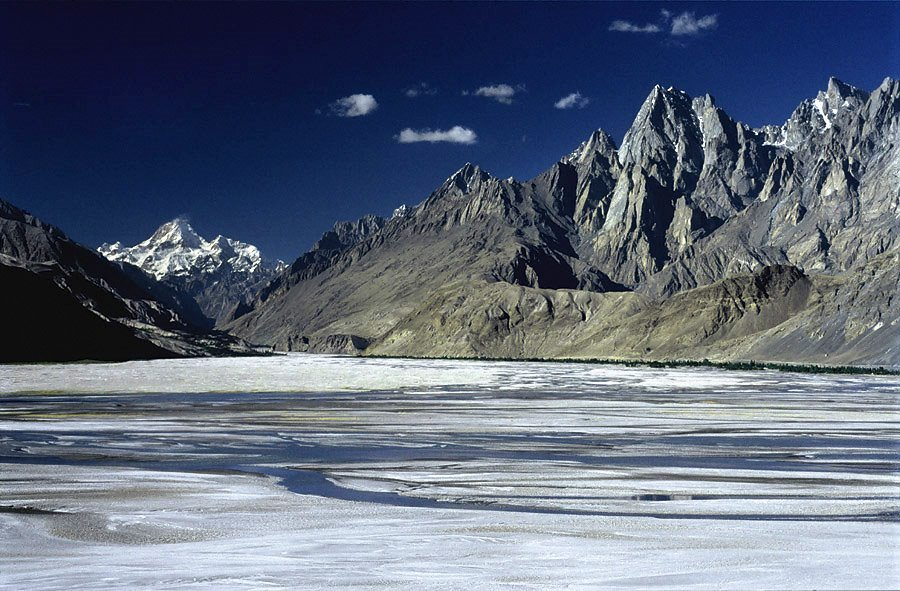
Masherbrum view from Surmo, Gilgit Baltistan.

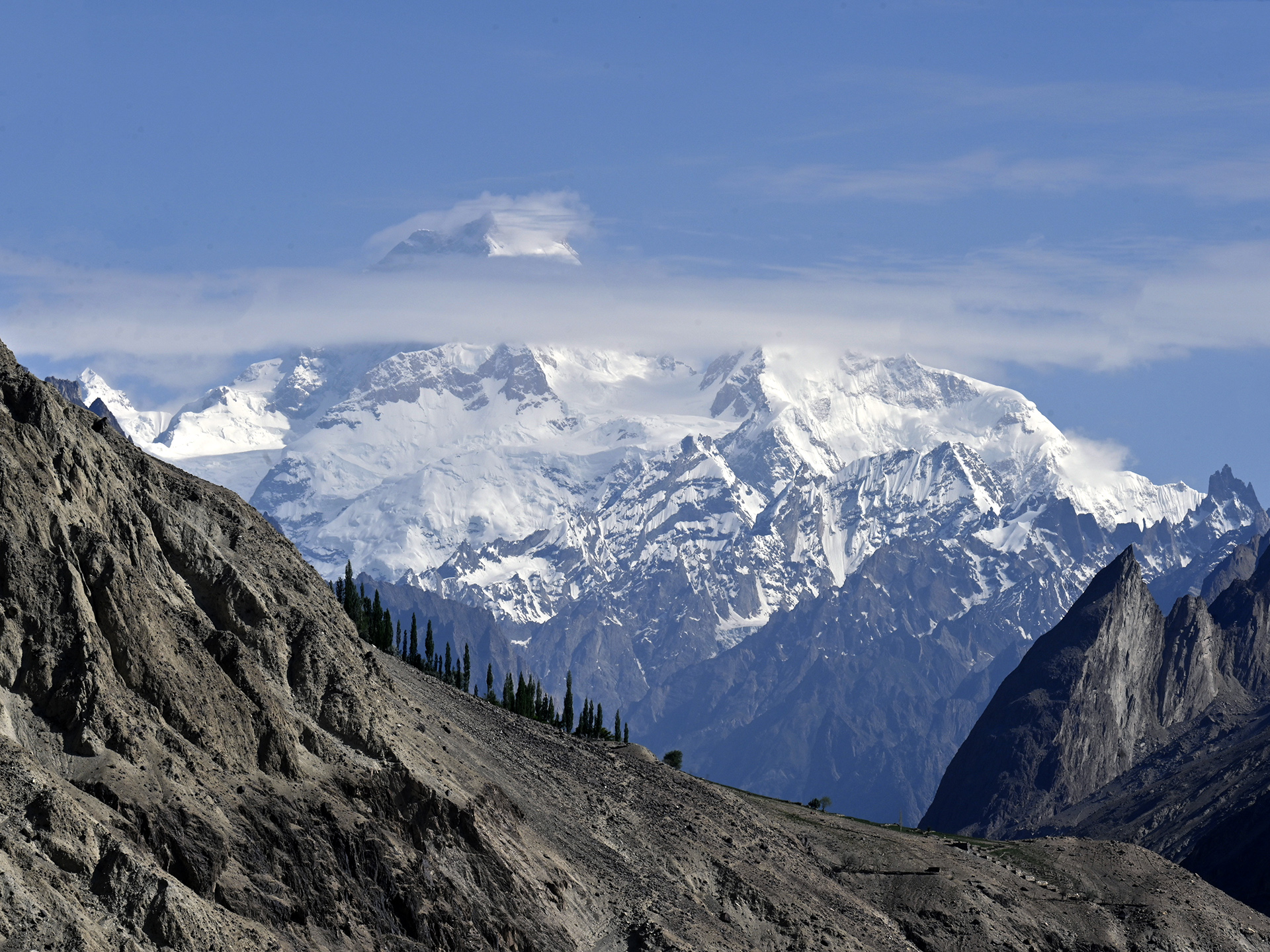
The south face of Masherbrum (7,821 m), formerly known as K1, seen from the road leading to the village of Hushe in Gilgit-Baltistan, Pakistan.

Masherbrum (Urdu: مشہ بروم; formerly known as K1) is a mountain located in the Ghanche District in the Gilgit Baltistan region of Pakistan. With an elevation of 7,821 metres (25,659 feet), it ranks as the 22nd highest mountain globally and the 9th highest in Pakistan.

It holds the distinction of being the first mapped peak in the Karakoram mountain range during the Great Trigonometrical Survey, leading to its K-number designation as "K1".

== Etymology ==
The etymology of the name "Masherbrum" is a subject of some debate and the exact origin of the name may still be open to interpretation and further research. While "brum" is understood to mean "mountain" in Balti, the origin of "masher" remains less clear. One suggestion is that it may come from "mashadar," which means a muzzle-loader, possibly alluding to the distinctive curvature or shape of its summit as observed from the Baltoro Glacier (and in Persian, "masheh" means both matchlock and trigger, and "dar" is a suffix meaning "having"). Others have noted that "masha" means lady, and thus "Masherbrum" is the "queen of peaks".

In neighbouring India, this mountain peak is known as "Mahasherbaram", which comes from Sanskrit word referring to "The White Tiger".

== Geography ==
Masherbrum is the highest peak of the Masherbrum Mountains, a subrange of the Karakoram range. It is a large and striking peak, which is somewhat overshadowed by the nearby 8,000-metre (26,000 ft) peaks of the main range of the Karakoram which includes four of the fourteen Eight-thousanders, namely K2, Gasherbrum I, Broad Peak and Gasherbrum II.

The Masherbrum Mountains lie to the south of the Baltoro Glacier and the main range of the Karakoram lies to the north of the Baltoro (which is the route most commonly used to access the 8000m peaks of the Karakoram). However, the "normal route" to Masherbrum is along the Hushe Valley which flows south from the summit.

== Climbing history ==
In 1856, Thomas Montgomerie, a British Royal Engineers lieutenant, noticed a tall mountain in the Karakorams and called it K1 (denoting peak 1 of the Karakorams; K2 was the name he gave to the nearby peak behind K1 when viewed from Harmukh). To the local people of the area, it is known as Masherbrum.

Masherbrum was reconnoitered in 1911 by Fanny Bullock Workman and her husband, Dr. William H. Workman. It was first attempted in 1938 from the south, by a group led by James Waller which included Dawa Thondup and J. O. M. Roberts. The attempt failed just short of the summit, when J.B. Harrison and R.A. Hodgkin, severely frostbitten, had to return due to bad weather.

Two more unsuccessful expeditions took place, in 1955 by a team from New Zealand and in 1957 by a UK team which included Don Whillans (on his first visit to the greater ranges). In 1955 the team reached c. 7000m. During the 1957 attempt Bob Downes died high on the mountain of altitude sickness and the highest point reached by the team was c. 200m below the summit.

Masherbrum was first climbed in 1960 by George Irving Bell and Willi Unsoeld, led by the former, in an American-Pakistani expedition including Nick Clinch. They succeeded in climbing the southeast face route that had stymied the earlier parties. Two days later team members Clinch and Pakistani mountaineer Jawed Akhter reached the summit. Masherbrum is the highest peak in Pakistan where a Pakistani man reached the summit on the first ascent expedition.

The Himalayan Index lists three additional ascents and six additional failed attempts on Masherbrum. Masherbrum has only ever been ascended from the north by one route, following the Northwest Ridge before traversing across the upper Northwest Face to reach the summit saddle.

In her book, Voyage au Bout du Vide: Une Cordėe Alpine au Masherbrum, the French mountaineer Christine de Colombel provides a dramatic account of her 1980 attempt, with David Belden, to ascend Masherbrum in alpine style. Their three-month expedition, bedeviled by bad weather, ended in failure when avalanches swept their camp and injured de Colombel, leading to a desperate three-day retreat in whiteout conditions.

== Sources ==
- Neate, Jill (1989). High Asia: An Illustrated History of the 7000 Metre Peaks. Seattle: The Mountaineers. ISBN 0-89886-238-8.
- Himalayan Index
