= Shispare =

Mountain in Pakistan

Shispare شیسپیئر
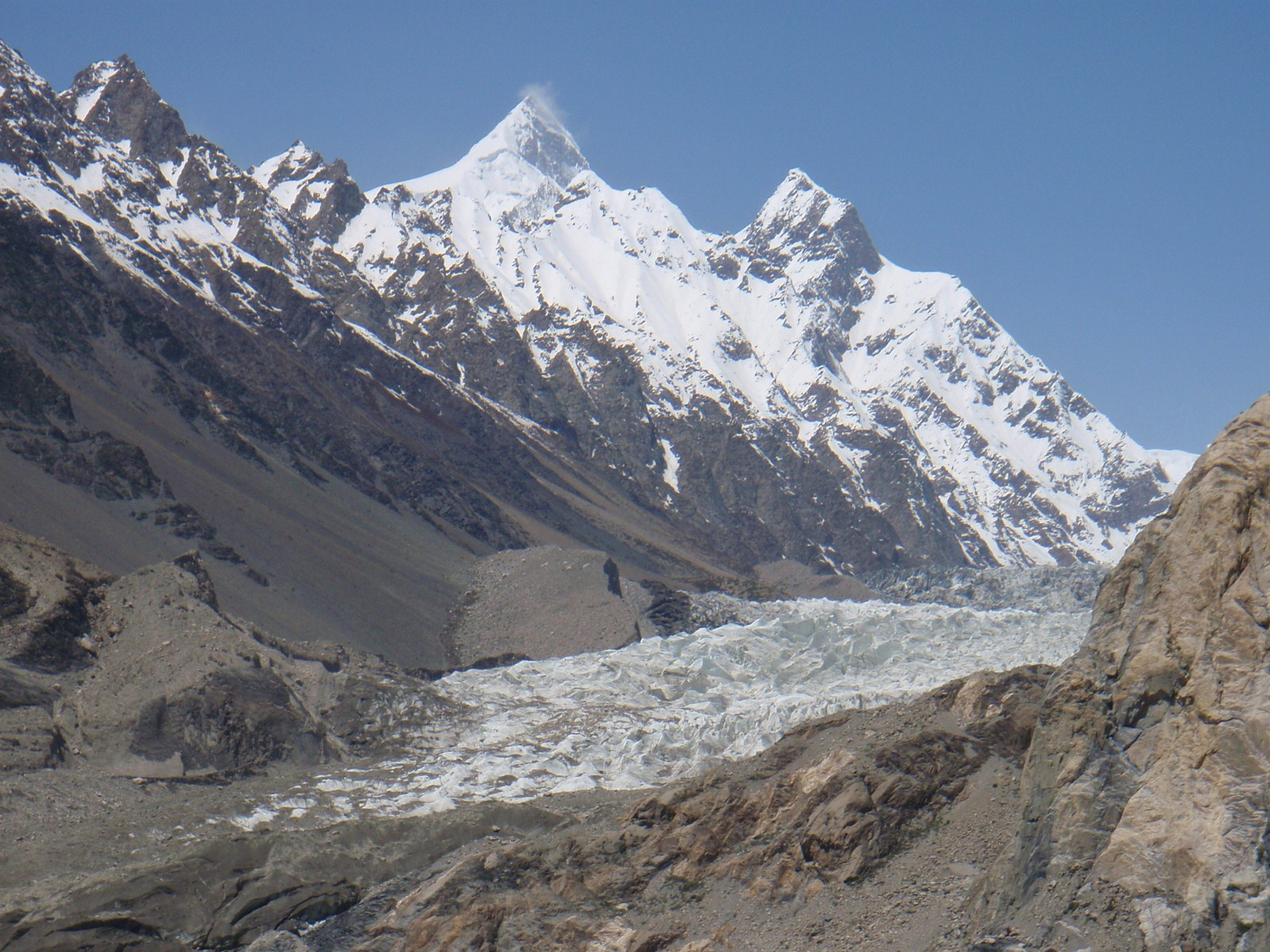
- Shispare above the Passu glacier

Highest point
- Elevation: 7,611 m (24,970 ft); Ranked 38th
- Prominence: 1,241 m (4,072 ft)
- Listing: Mountains of Pakistan
- Coordinates: 36°26.4′N 74°40.9′E

Geography
- Location within Pakistan Location within Gilgit Baltistan
- The major peaks in Karakoram are rank identified by height. Legend: 1：K2; 2：Gasherbrum I, K5; 3：Broad Peak; 4：Gasherbrum II, K4; 5：Gasherbrum III, K3a; 6：Gasherbrum IV, K3; 7：Distaghil Sar; 8：Kunyang Chhish; 9：Masherbrum, K1; 10：Batura Sar, Batura I; 11：Rakaposhi; 12：Batura II; 13：Kanjut Sar; 14：Saltoro Kangri, K10; 15：Batura III; 16： Saser Kangri I, K22; 17：Chogolisa; 18：Shispare; 19：Trivor Sar; 20：Skyang Kangri; 21：Mamostong Kangri, K35; 22：Saser Kangri II; 23：Saser Kangri III; 24：Pumari Chhish; 25：Passu Sar; 26：Yukshin Gardan Sar; 27：Teram Kangri I; 28：Malubiting; 29：K12; 30：Sia Kangri; 31：Momhil Sar; 32：Skil Brum; 33：Haramosh Peak; 34：Ghent Kangri; 35：Ultar Sar; 36：Rimo Massif; 37：Sherpi Kangri; 38：Yazghil Dome South; 39：Baltoro Kangri; 40：Crown Peak; 41：Baintha Brakk; 42：Yutmaru Sar; 43：K6; 44：Muztagh Tower; 45：Diran; 46：Apsarasas Kangri I; 47：Rimo III; 48：Gasherbrum V; Location in Pakistan
- Location: Passu, Gilgit-Baltistan, Pakistan
- Parent range: Karakoram

Climbing
- First ascent: July 21, 1974 by H. Bleicher, L. Cichy, M. Grochowski, J. Holnicki-Szulc, A. Mlynarczyk, H. Oberhofer, J. Poreba
- Easiest route: Rock/snow/ice climb

Shispare
- Traditional Chinese: 喜士帕爾峰
Transcriptions

Shispare (Urdu: شیسپیئر) is one of the high mountain peaks of the Batura Muztagh, the westernmost subrange of the Karakoram range in the Gilgit-Baltistan region of Pakistan.

Alternate forms of the name of this peak include Shispare Sar, Shisparé Sari "Fiak Ting" فیاک ٹنگ or Tegh Sar تیغ سر (which means Sharp Head in the local Wakhi language).

== Location ==
Shispare lies east of the Batura Wall, which is the highest part of the Batura Muztagh in Pakistan. Notable neighbouring peaks include Pasu Sar to the northwest, Bojohagur Duanasir, Ultar, Hunza Peak and Ladyfinger Peak, which comprise the most southeasterly of the major groups of the Batura Muztagh. The Hunza River curves around the southeastern, eastern, and northeastern sides of the Batura Muztagh, and Shispare towers above the western bank of the river. In turn, the Hunza Valley lies in the Hunza District of Gilgit-Baltistan, Pakistan.

== Notable features ==
Shispare is notable for its tremendous rise above local terrain. For example, the nearby town of Karimabad, in the Hunza Valley, has an elevation of 2,060 m (6,759 ft), making for 5,550 m (18,210 ft) of relief, in only 13 km (8 mi) horizontal distance. Being near the end of the Batura Muztagh, it commands large drops in three directions (north, east, and south). In addition, Shispare has a strikingly large and steep Northeast Face.

== Climbing history ==
Climbing began in the Batura Muztagh later than in other parts of the Karakoram. Shispare was the first major peak in the range to be successfully climbed, in 1974, by the "Polish-German Academic Expedition" under the leadership of Janusz Kurczab. The ascent took 35 days, and during preparations for a second group to try for the summit, one member of the expedition (Heinz Borchers) was killed in an avalanche.

The first ascent route followed the Passu Glacier to the East Ridge, between the Passu Glacier. (Note: this ridge goes southeast from the summit, turns northeast, and then turns roughly east, so it is called the "southeast ridge" and the "northeast ridge" in different sources.) Difficulties included a long ice ridge, and the access to the ridge required 1500m of fixed rope.

The next attempt was in 1989 by members of the Ryukoku University Alpine Club in Japan, led by Masato Okamoto. The group was on the mountain for almost two months, but was not able to summit; their high point was around 7,200 m (23,620 ft).

In 1994, a group from the Komono Alpine Club in Japan, led by Yukiteru Masui, achieved the second ascent of the peak. They reached Base Camp on June 18, and Masui, Kokubu, and Ozawa reached the summit on July 20. They followed the same route as the first ascent party and climbed in a similar style, with a similar amount of fixed rope.

In 2017, Japanese climbers Kazuya Hiraide and Kenro Nakajima made the first alpine-style ascent via the previously unclimbed northeast route, and they won the Piolets d'Or prize.

The Himalayan Index lists no other ascents or attempts of this peak.

== Books, pamphlets, and maps about Shispare ==
- Neate, Jill (1989). High Asia: An Illustrated History of the 7000 Metre Peaks. Seattle: The Mountaineers. ISBN 0-89886-238-8.
- Batura Mustagh (sketch map and pamphlet) by Jerzy Wala, 1988.
- Orographical Sketch Map of the Karakoram by Jerzy Wala, 1990. Published by the Swiss Foundation for Alpine Research.
