= Batura Muztagh =

Mountain range in Pakistan

Batura Muztagh بتورا موز تاغ
- Chinese: 巴托拉慕士塔格山
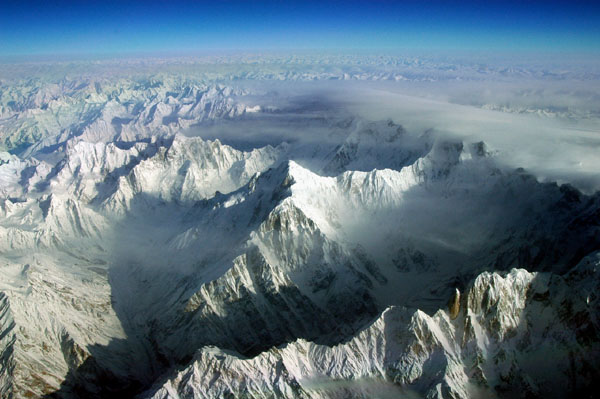
- Aerial view of part of the Batura Muztagh from the southeast

Highest point
- Peak: Batura Sar
- Elevation: 7,795 m (25,574 ft)
- Coordinates: 36°30′36″N 74°31′37″E

Geography
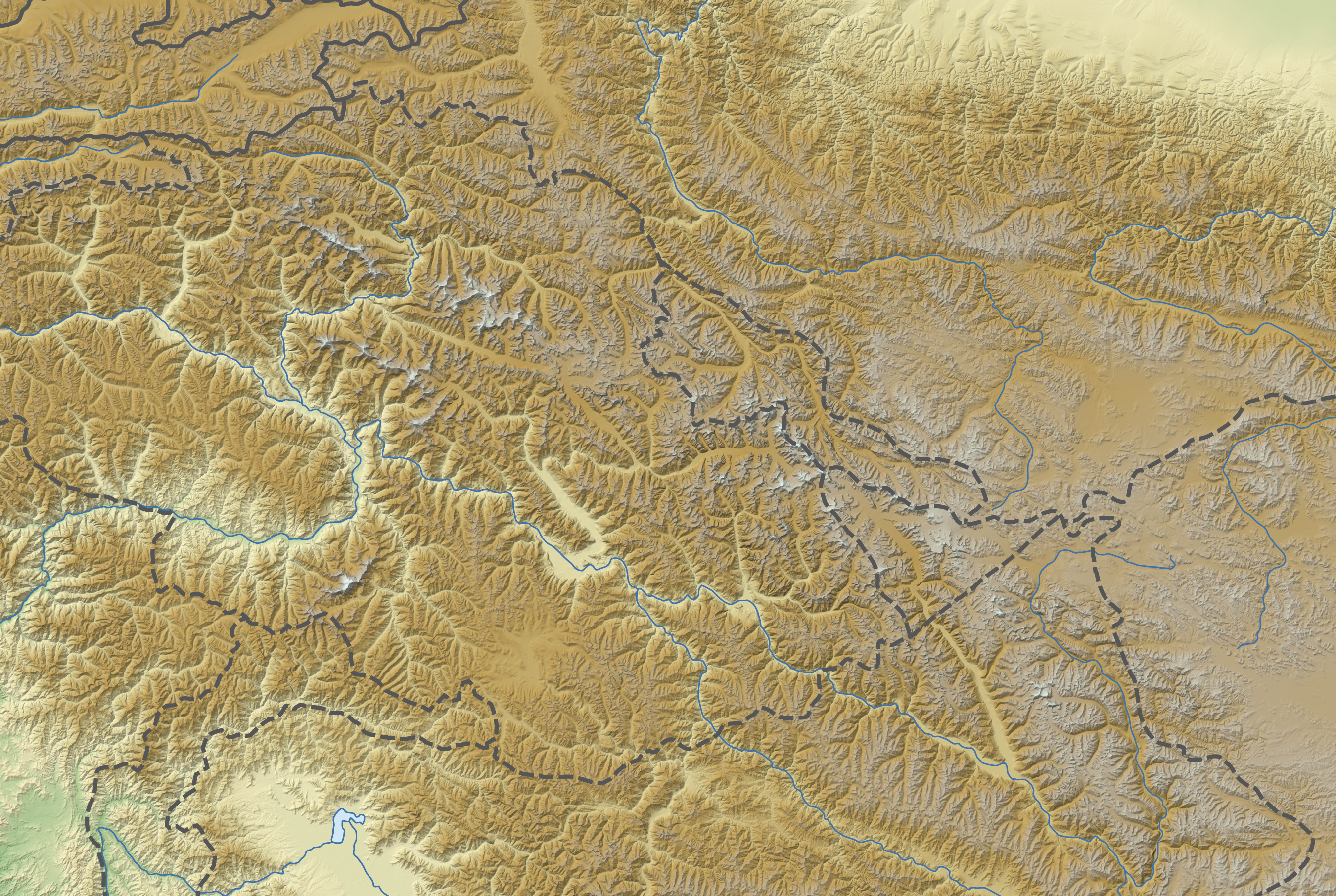
- Location within Karakoram Location within Gilgit Baltistan Location within Pakistan
- Country: Pakistan
- Region: Gilgit District
- Parent range: Karakoram

The Batura Muztagh (Urdu: بتورا موز تاغ) mountains are a sub-range of the Karakoram mountain range. They are located in Passu (Gojal Valley) in the Hunza District of Gilgit-Baltistan region in northern Pakistan.

They are the westernmost sub-range of the Karakoram, running from Chalt village in Bar Valley in the east to Kampir Dior in the Kurumbar Valley in the west, and they separate the Hindu Raj range from the Karakoram range. The Muchu Chhish peak located in this sub-range remained for many years the second highest unclimbed peak in the world, until its successful summit in 2024 by a Czech team.

== Selected peaks in the Batura Muztagh ==
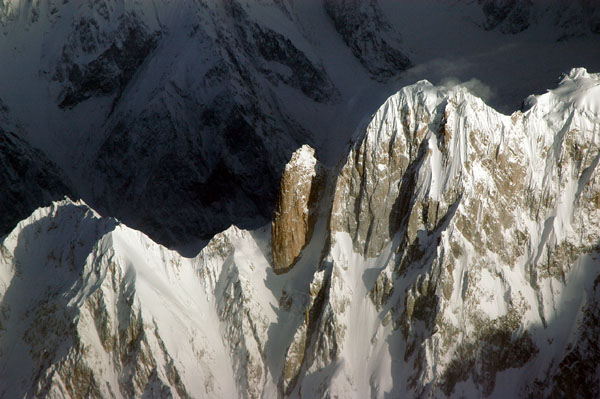
Bublimotin and Hunza Peak, southeastern Batura Muztagh

Mountain	Height (m)	Height (ft)	Coordinates	Prominence (m)	Parent mountain	First ascent	Ascents (attempts) (Note: This data is from the Himalayan Index and is not always correct. In particular it is not clear if Batura Sar has really had four ascents or only three.)
Batura Sar (Note: Sometimes called Batura I.)	7,795	25,574	36°30′36″N 74°31′27″E	3,118	Distaghil Sar	1976	4 (6)
Shispare	7,611	24,970	36°26′26″N 74°40′51″E	1,240	Batura Sar	1974	3 (1)
Pasu Sar	7,476	24,528	36°29′16″N 74°35′16″E	645	Batura Sar	1994	1 (0)
Ultar Sar (Note: Sometimes called Ultar II or Bojohagur Duanasir II.)	7,388	24,239	36°23′54″N 74°42′32″E	700	Shispare	1996	2 (5)
Sangemarmar Sar (Note: Also known as Sang-e-Marmar (or Sangemarmar), and sometimes referred to by locals as Marble Peak.)	7,000 (Note: The heights given for this peak vary between 6949m and 7050m.)	22,966	36°25′31″N 74°33′38″E	1,100	Pasu Sar	1984	1 (3)
Bublimotin (Ladyfinger Peak)	6,000 (Note: This elevation is approximate.)	19,685	36°22′12″N 74°39′00″E	<200	Hunza Peak	1982	2 (5)

== Books, pamphlets, and maps ==
- Neate, Jill (1989). High Asia: An Illustrated History of the 7000 Metre Peaks. Seattle: The Mountaineers. ISBN 0-89886-238-8.
- Batura Mustagh (sketch map and pamphlet) by Jerzy Wala, 1988.
- Orographical Sketch Map of the Karakoram by Jerzy Wala, 1990. Published by the Swiss Foundation for Alpine Research.

== See also ==
- List of highest mountains of the World
- List of mountains in Pakistan
