= Sangemarmar Sar =

Pyramidal peak in the Batura Muztagh, Pakistan

Sangemarmar Sar سنگ مرمر سر
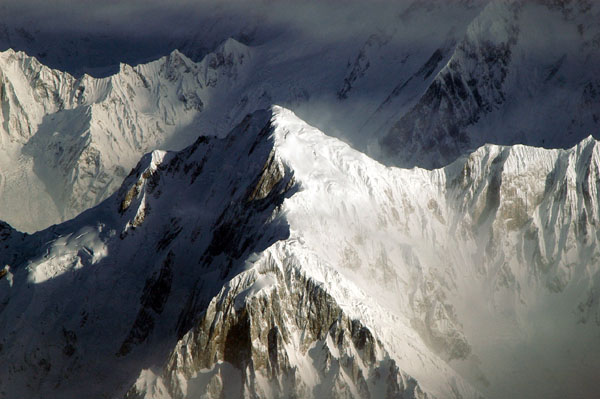
- Aerial close-up of Sangemarmar Sar from the southeast

Highest point
- Elevation: 6,949 m (22,799 ft)
- Prominence: 1,050 m (3,440 ft)
- Listing: Mountains of Pakistan
- Coordinates: 36°25′31″N 74°33′38″E

Geography
- Location within Pakistan
- Country: Pakistan
- Parent range: Karakoram, Batura Muztagh

Climbing
- First ascent: 1984 by Takashi Matsuo et al.

Sangemarmar Sar (Urdu: سنگ مرمر سر), or Sangemar Mar and Sang-e-Marmar, is a pyramidal peak in the Batura Muztagh, at the end of a spur ridge running southwest from Passu Sar in Pakistan. It lies between the Muchuhar Glacier to the west, and the Shispare (or Hasanabad) Glacier to the east.

== Overview ==
Because it is much lower in elevation than many of the surrounding peaks, such as Batura Sar and Rakaposhi, Sangemarmar Sar is little-known, and there has been only one successful ascent of the peak, according to the Himalayan Index. However, because of its location on the southern flank of the main crest of the range, relatively near the Hunza Valley, it does enjoy tremendous vertical relief above local terrain. For example, its summit rises over 5,000 metres (16,400 ft) above the Hunza River, in a horizontal distance of 15 kilometres (9 mi).

The mountain was named (as "Sangemarmur", meaning in Persian "ore/ heart of marble", after a conspicuous band of yellow marble crossing the summit) in 1964 by the First Canadian Himalayan Expedition, comprising Fred Roots (leader), Donald Lyon, John Ricker, Lisle Irwin, Donald Poole, Hermann Jamek, Momin Khalifa and Karl Tomm. They intended to locate and climb Hachindar Chhish, which they determined to be a peak a few kilometers to the west of Sangemarmar Sar; however that peak proved too difficult and technical for the party to attempt. The expedition reached 6,300 metres (20,700 ft) but was then forced to retreat by repeated heavy snowstorms.

On July 11, 1984, a team from Osaka University made the first ascent of the mountain via the southwest ridge. The expedition comprised Takashi Matsuo (leader), Hiromi Okuyama, Takehiro Hirota, Tokio Kozuki, Masaya Oishi, Toru Sakakibara, Kenya Sato, Shinichi Miyata, Tomoyoshi Mizukawa, Hiroyuki Onishi, and Akira Noguchi. All members reached the summit, on two separate days. They encountered ice up to 50 degrees. They used three high camps, and fixed 3,000 metres (10,000 ft) of rope.
