= Ultar =

Mountain in Pakistan

Ultar Sar
- آلتر سار
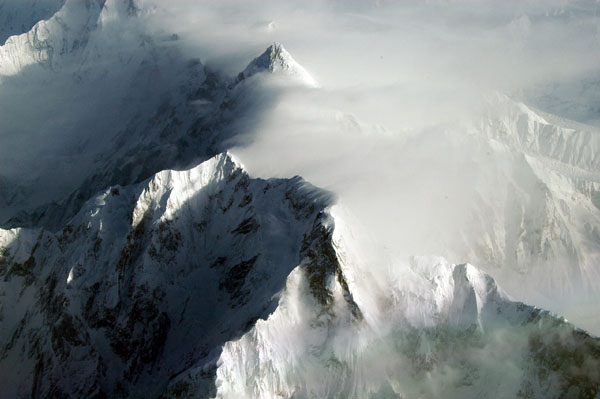
- Ultar Sar (centre foreground) viewed from the southeast, with Shispare (centre background) and Bojohagur Duanasir (left foreground).

Highest point
- Elevation: 7,388 m (24,239 ft); Ranked 70th
- Prominence: 688 m (2,257 ft)
- Listing: Mountains of Pakistan
- Coordinates: 36°23′59″N 74°41′31″E

Geography
- Location within Pakistan Location within Gilgit Baltistan
- The major peaks in Karakoram are rank identified by height. Legend: 1：K2; 2：Gasherbrum I, K5; 3：Broad Peak; 4：Gasherbrum II, K4; 5：Gasherbrum III, K3a; 6：Gasherbrum IV, K3; 7：Distaghil Sar; 8：Kunyang Chhish; 9：Masherbrum, K1; 10：Batura Sar, Batura I; 11：Rakaposhi; 12：Batura II; 13：Kanjut Sar; 14：Saltoro Kangri, K10; 15：Batura III; 16： Saser Kangri I, K22; 17：Chogolisa; 18：Shispare; 19：Trivor Sar; 20：Skyang Kangri; 21：Mamostong Kangri, K35; 22：Saser Kangri II; 23：Saser Kangri III; 24：Pumari Chhish; 25：Passu Sar; 26：Yukshin Gardan Sar; 27：Teram Kangri I; 28：Malubiting; 29：K12; 30：Sia Kangri; 31：Momhil Sar; 32：Skil Brum; 33：Haramosh Peak; 34：Ghent Kangri; 35：Ultar Sar; 36：Rimo Massif; 37：Sherpi Kangri; 38：Yazghil Dome South; 39：Baltoro Kangri; 40：Crown Peak; 41：Baintha Brakk; 42：Yutmaru Sar; 43：K6; 44：Muztagh Tower; 45：Diran; 46：Apsarasas Kangri I; 47：Rimo III; 48：Gasherbrum V; Location in Gilgit-Baltistan
- Location: Gilgit–Baltistan, Pakistan
- Parent range: Karakoram, Batura

Climbing
- First ascent: 1996 by Akito Yamazaki & Kiyoshi Matsuoka
- Normal route: Via Bathbakor Base Camp

Ultar
- Traditional Chinese: 烏爾塔峰
Transcriptions

Ultar (also Ultar Sar Urdu: آلتر سار, Ultar II, Bojohagur Duanasir II) is the southeasternmost major peak of the Batura Muztagh, a subrange of the Karakoram range. It lies about 10 km (6.2 mi) northeast of Karimabad, a town on the Karakoram Highway in the Hunza Valley, part of the Hunza District of Gilgit–Baltistan, Pakistan.

While not one of the highest peaks of the Karakoram, Ultar Sar is notable for its dramatic rise above local terrain. Its south flank rises over 5,300 metres (17,400 ft) above the Hunza River near Karimabad, in only about 9 km (5.6 mi) of horizontal distance. Combined with its strategic position at the end of the Batura Muztagh, with the Hunza River bending around it, this makes Ultar a visually striking peak.

== Climbing history ==
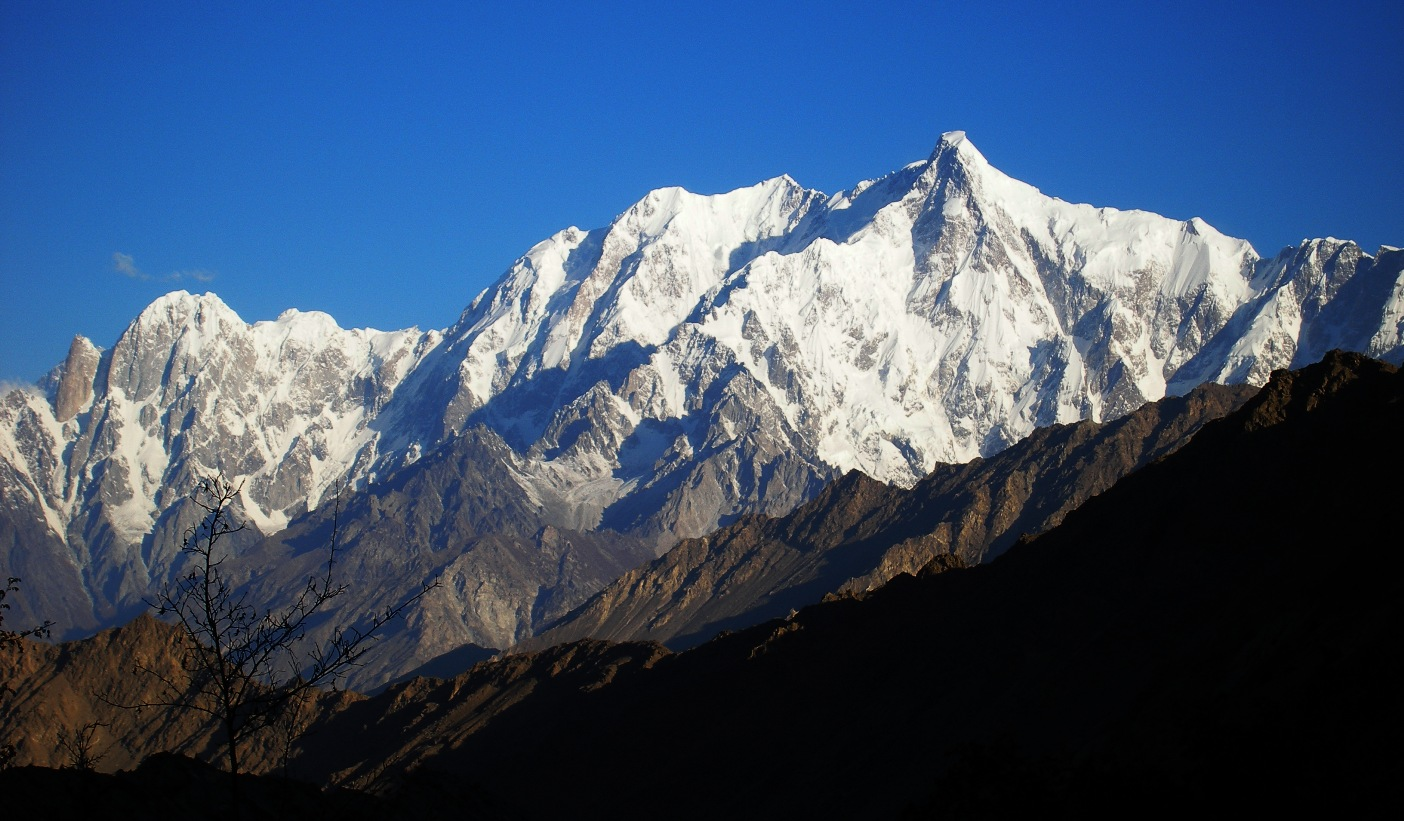
Ultar Sar (right), Bojohagur Duanasir (left of it); Hunza Peak and Bublimotin (far left)

Ultar Sar also gained fame in the 1990s as supposedly the world's highest unclimbed independent peak. This was incorrect, as Gangkhar Puensum in Bhutan is higher, and remains unclimbed (and off-limits) as of 2007 (two other higher peaks are also reputedly unclimbed and of independent stature). However, that perception did add to the appeal of the peak, and a number of expeditions attempted to climb it. During the 1980s and 1990s fifteen expeditions made attempts and no summits, but with a number of fatalities.

The first two summits were made in 1996 by two separate Japanese expeditions, the first on 11 July from the Tokai section of the Japanese Alpine Club led by Akito Yamazaki, and the second led by Ken Takahashi. The first summit team comprised Yamazaki and Kiyoshi Matsuoka (who died one year later on the nearby Ladyfinger Peak). They climbed the peak from the southwest in alpine style, doing much of the climbing at night to avoid danger from falling rock and ice. After their summit, they faced strong storms and bivouacked several days without food before returning to basecamp. Yamazaki died of high altitude sickness after the descent to basecamp. The second summit was made on 31 July via the south ridge by Takahashi, Masayuki Ando, Ryushi Hoshino, Wataru Saito, and Nobuo Tsutsumi.

Third ascent of the peak was also made from the south west by Daniel Akbar a British born Pakistani climber. Daniel climbed the peak solo in alpine style using some of the old fixed ropes from the earlier expedition.

On 1 July 2018, Pakistan Army pilots in a daring mission rescued three foreign mountaineers stuck in snow avalanche at above the height of 5,800 metres (19,000 ft) on Ultar Sar Peak near Hunza. Bruce Normand and Timothy Miller from UK successfully rescued alive while their companion Christian Huber from Austria had succumbed to an avalanche. His dead body was recovered.

== Nearby summits and glaciers ==
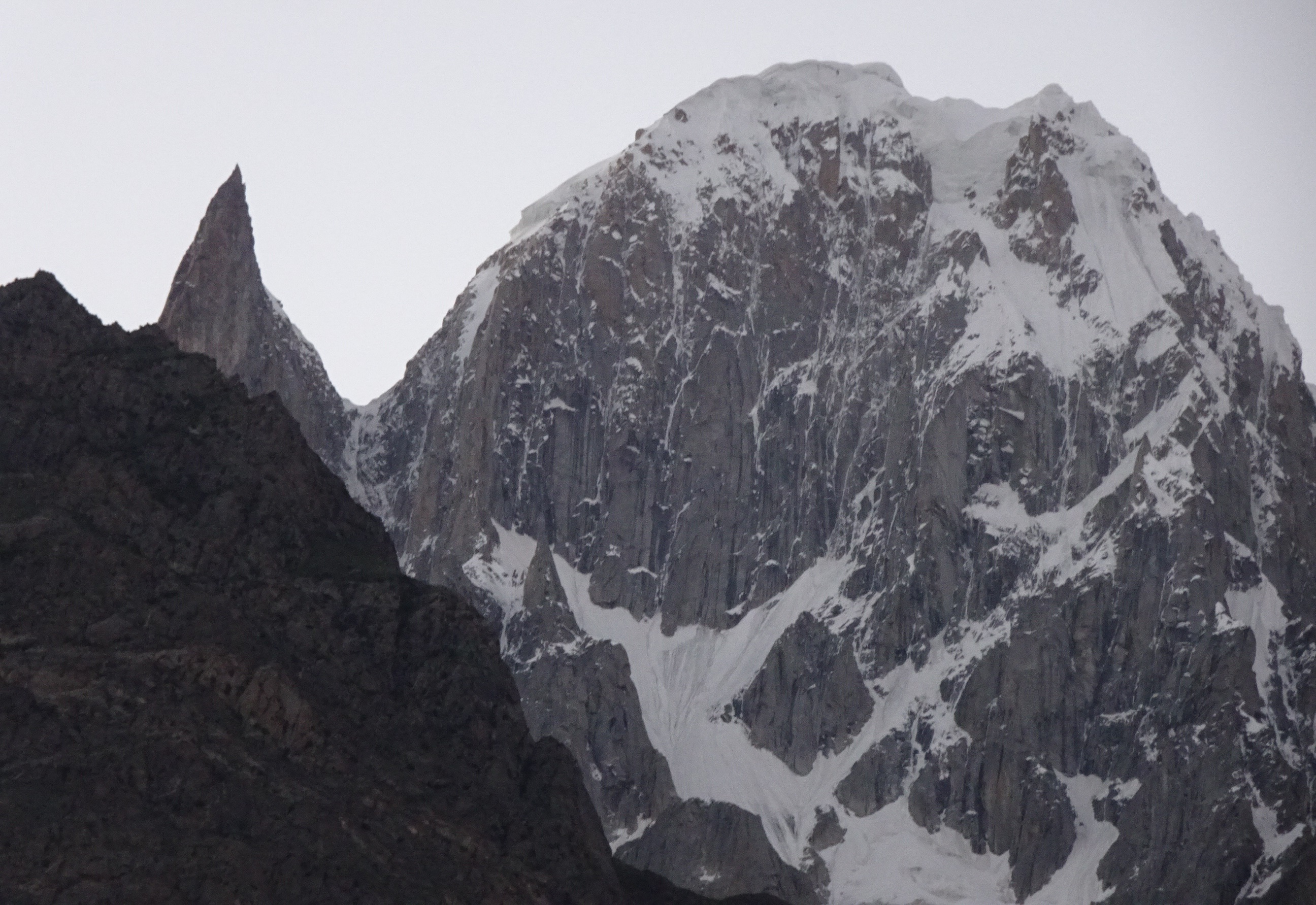
Close-up of Ladyfinger Peak and Hunza Peak

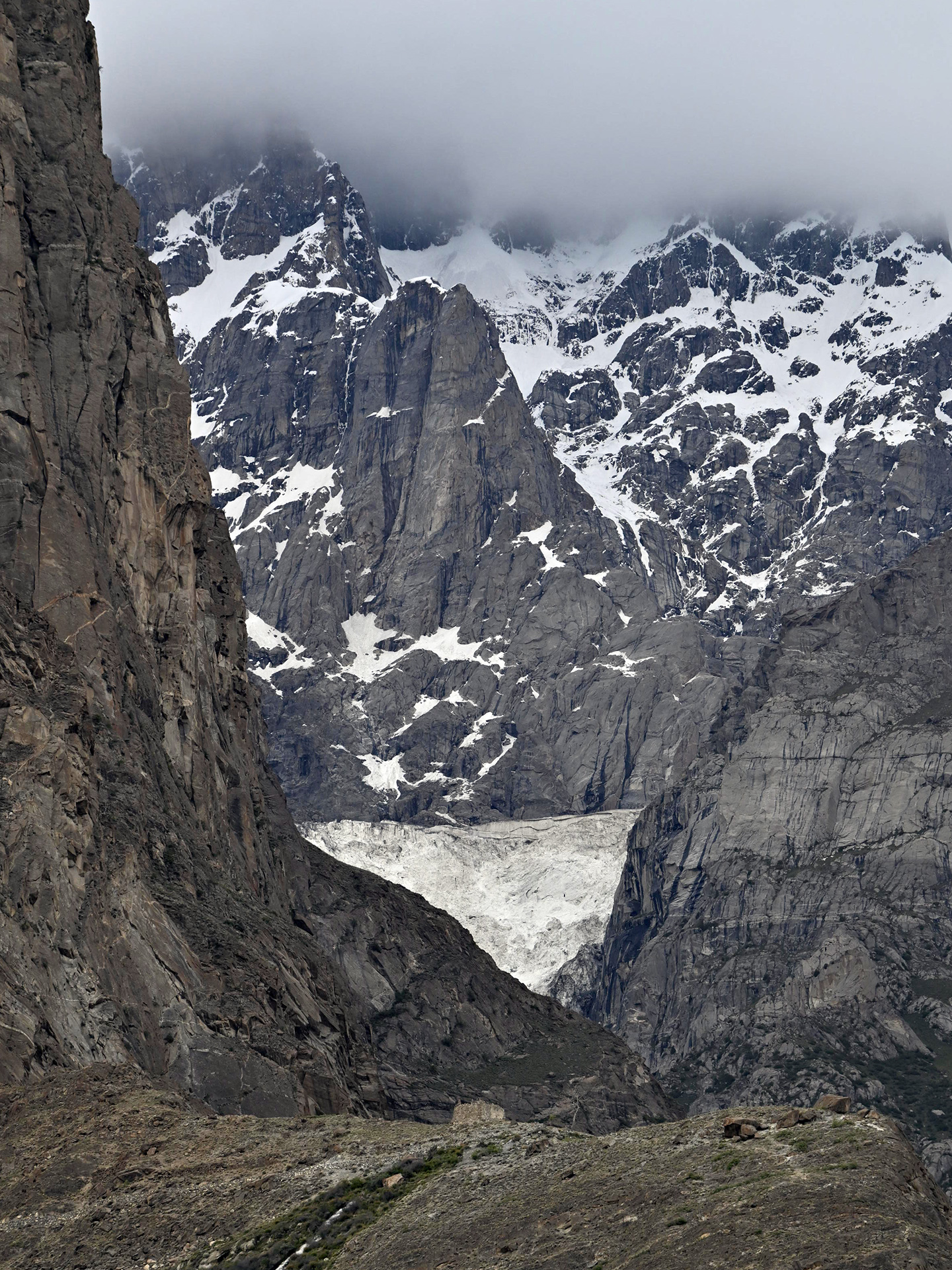
View of the Ultar Glacier as seen from the rooftop of Baltit Fort in Karimabad, Hunza. The glacier flows down from the Ultar Sar massif in the Karakoram Range and is a prominent feature visible from the fort.

Ultar Sar is the east end of a short, somewhat level ridge, the west end of which is a peak called Bojohagur Duanasir (7,329 m/24,045 ft), climbed in 1984 by a Japanese party. To the northwest of both peaks is the huge pyramid of Shispare (7,611 m/24,970 ft). Along the southwest ridge of the massif are Hunza Peak and the striking rock spire of Ladyfinger Peak. The glaciers draining the slopes of the massif are (clockwise from north): the Ghulkin Glacier, the Gulmit Glacier, the Ahmad Abad Glacier, the Ultar Glacier, and the Hasanabad Glacier (many of these have other names as well).

== See also ==
- Hunza
- Highest Mountains of the World

== Sources ==
- Jerzy Wala, Orographical Sketch Map of the Karakoram, Swiss Foundation for Alpine Research, 1990.
- Jerzy Wala, Orographical Sketch Map of the Batura Muztagh, 1988.
- Himalayan Index
- Kashmir § Terminology
