= Muztagh Tower =

Mountain in Pakistan and China

Muztagh Tower مز تاغ ٹاور
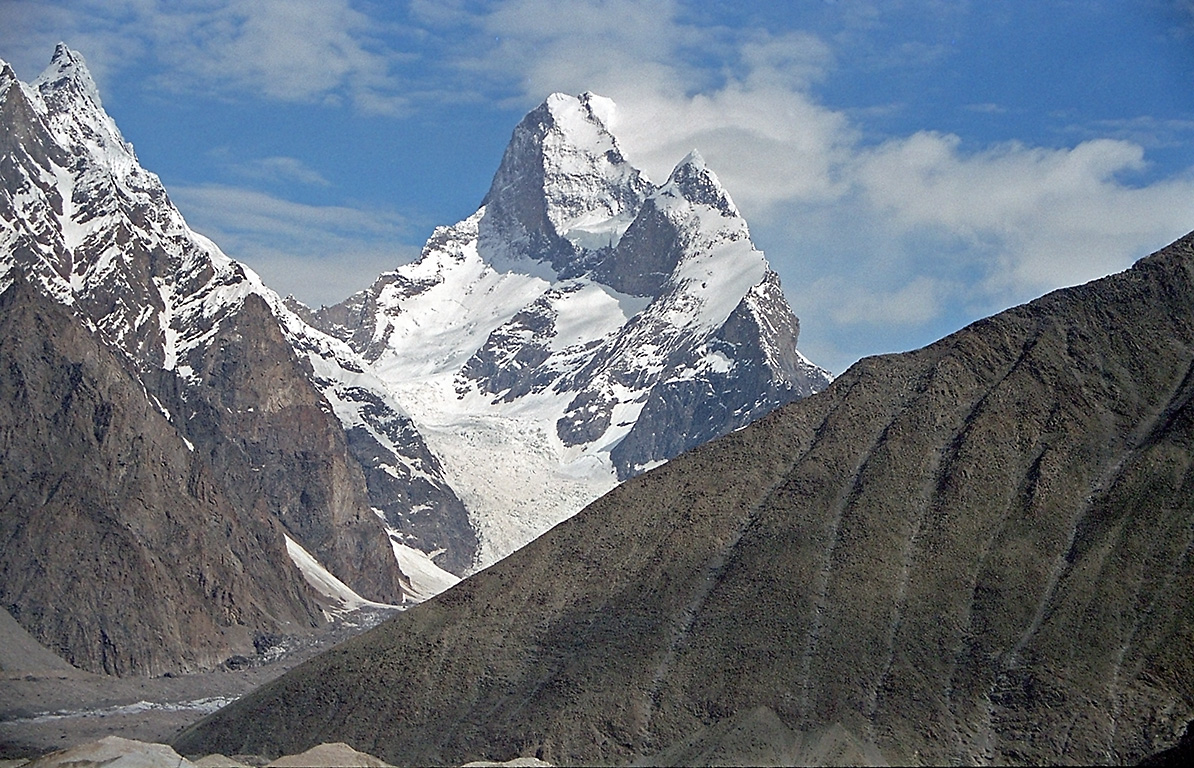
- Muztagh Tower in 2004

Highest point
- Elevation: 7,276 m (23,871 ft); Ranked 90th
- Prominence: 1,710 m (5,610 ft) (Note: Peakbagger states 7,273 metres elev. and 1,707 metres prom.)
- Listing: Mountains of Pakistan; Mountains of China; Ultra
- Coordinates: 35°49′36″N 76°21′42″E

Geography
- Location within Karakoram Location within Gilgit Baltistan Location within Southern Xinjiang
- The major peaks in Karakoram are rank identified by height. Legend: 1：K2; 2：Gasherbrum I, K5; 3：Broad Peak; 4：Gasherbrum II, K4; 5：Gasherbrum III, K3a; 6：Gasherbrum IV, K3; 7：Distaghil Sar; 8：Kunyang Chhish; 9：Masherbrum, K1; 10：Batura Sar, Batura I; 11：Rakaposhi; 12：Batura II; 13：Kanjut Sar; 14：Saltoro Kangri, K10; 15：Batura III; 16： Saser Kangri I, K22; 17：Chogolisa; 18：Shispare; 19：Trivor Sar; 20：Skyang Kangri; 21：Mamostong Kangri, K35; 22：Saser Kangri II; 23：Saser Kangri III; 24：Pumari Chhish; 25：Passu Sar; 26：Yukshin Gardan Sar; 27：Teram Kangri I; 28：Malubiting; 29：K12; 30：Sia Kangri; 31：Momhil Sar; 32：Skil Brum; 33：Haramosh Peak; 34：Ghent Kangri; 35：Ultar Sar; 36：Rimo Massif; 37：Sherpi Kangri; 38：Yazghil Dome South; 39：Baltoro Kangri; 40：Crown Peak; 41：Baintha Brakk; 42：Yutmaru Sar; 43：K6; 44：Muztagh Tower; 45：Diran; 46：Apsarasas Kangri I; 47：Rimo III; 48：Gasherbrum V
- Location: Baltistan, Gilgit–Baltistan, Pakistan; Tashkurgan, Xinjiang, China, China–Pakistan border
- Parent range: Karakoram

Climbing
- First ascent: 6 July 1956 by a British team
- Easiest route: glacier/snow/ice climb

Muztagh Tower
- Simplified Chinese: 慕士塔格塔峰
Transcriptions

Muztagh Tower (Urdu: مز تاغ ٹاور), also Mustagh Tower; Muztagh: icy mountain), is a mountain situated in Baltoro Muztagh, which is a segment of the Karakoram range. It straddles the border of the Gilgit–Baltistan region of Pakistan and the Xinjiang Uyghur Autonomous Region of China. Muztagh Tower is located between the basins of the Baltoro and Sarpo Laggo glaciers.

== Early prominence ==
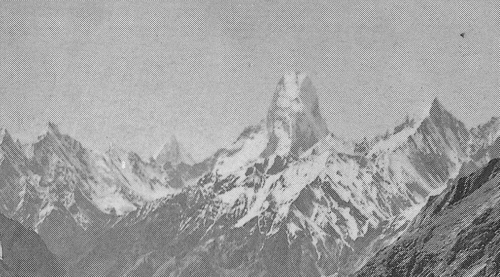
Vittorio Sella's 1909 photograph of the Muztagh Tower, which was to inspire the first ascent

The Mustagh Tower gained attention through a photograph captured by Vittorio Sella during the 1909 Italian expedition to K2. The picture was taken from the upper Baltoro, from a vantage point located due southeast of the mountain. In this photograph, the twin summits of Mustagh Tower appeared perfectly aligned, giving the mountain the appearance of a slender tooth and making it seem extremely impregnable. This image was featured in a book on mountaineering in 1941 with the caption "The Last Citadel".

== First and second ascents ==
Nearly five decades after Vittorio Sella's photograph was taken, in 1956, his image served as inspiration for two separate expeditions that raced to achieve the first ascent of Mustagh Tower. Interestingly, both teams discovered that the mountain's routes were less steep than what Sella's photograph had suggested. The British expedition, consisting of John Hartog, Joe Brown, Tom Patey and Ian McNaught-Davis, approached the peak from the Chagaran Glacier on the west side and successfully reached the summit via the Northwest Ridge on July 6. They achieved this feat five days ahead of the French team, consisting of Guido Magnone, Robert Paragot, André Contamine, and Paul Keller, who climbed the mountain from the east. François Florence waited for the two parties at the camp IV during 42 hours without a radio, when they went, reached the summit and came back to this camp.

== Notable ascents and attempts ==
- 1984: Northwest Ridge 2nd of route, 3rd of peak by Mal Duff, Tony Brindle, Jon Tinker and Sandy Allan (all UK).
- 1990: The fourth ascent was made by Göran Kropp and Rafael Jensen.
- 2008: On 24 August 2008, the Northeast Face was climbed by two Slovenian alpinists, Pavle Kozjek and Dejan Miškovič. They bivouacked on the crest after 17 hours of climbing. They decided not to go to the summit due to strong winds. Just after they started descending, Kozjek fell to his death.
- 2012: On 25 August, 56 years after the first ascent of this mountain, three Russians made an ascent by the centre Northeast Face. Sergei Nilov, Dmitry Golovchenko and Alexander Lange reached the top and made a new route. The ascent lasted for 17 days.

== See also ==
- List of ultras of the Karakoram and Hindu Kush
