= Saltoro Kangri =

Mountain in disputed Kashmir region administered by India

- Location within Karakoram Location within Gilgit Baltistan Location within Ladakh
- The major peaks in Karakoram are rank identified by height. Legend: 1：K2; 2：Gasherbrum I, K5; 3：Broad Peak; 4：Gasherbrum II, K4; 5：Gasherbrum III, K3a; 6：Gasherbrum IV, K3; 7：Distaghil Sar; 8：Kunyang Chhish; 9：Masherbrum, K1; 10：Batura Sar, Batura I; 11：Rakaposhi; 12：Batura II; 13：Kanjut Sar; 14：Saltoro Kangri, K10; 15：Batura III; 16： Saser Kangri I, K22; 17：Chogolisa; 18：Shispare; 19：Trivor Sar; 20：Skyang Kangri; 21：Mamostong Kangri, K35; 22：Saser Kangri II; 23：Saser Kangri III; 24：Pumari Chhish; 25：Passu Sar; 26：Yukshin Gardan Sar; 27：Teram Kangri I; 28：Malubiting; 29：K12; 30：Sia Kangri; 31：Momhil Sar; 32：Skil Brum; 33：Haramosh Peak; 34：Ghent Kangri; 35：Ultar Sar; 36：Rimo Massif; 37：Sherpi Kangri; 38：Yazghil Dome South; 39：Baltoro Kangri; 40：Crown Peak; 41：Baintha Brakk; 42：Yutmaru Sar; 43：K6; 44：Muztagh Tower; 45：Diran; 46：Apsarasas Kangri I; 47：Rimo III; 48：Gasherbrum V

Highest point
- Elevation: 7,742 m (25,400 ft); Ranked 31st
- Prominence: 2,160 m (7,090 ft)
- Listing: Ultra
- Coordinates: 35°23′57.6″N 76°50′55.2″E

Dimensions
- Length: 80 km (50 mi)

Geography
- Location: Saltoro Ridge, Siachen, Actual Ground Position Line, Saltoro Kangri on the border between Indian and Pakistani controlled territories
- Parent range: Saltoro Mountains, Karakoram

Climbing
- First ascent: 24 July 1962 by Y. Takamura, A. Saito, Capt. Bashir
- Easiest route: rock/snow/ice climb

Saltoro Kangri
- Traditional Chinese: 薩爾托洛崗日峰
Transcriptions

Saltoro Kangri, previously known as Peak 36, stands as the highest peak within the Saltoro Mountains subrange, which is part of the larger Karakoram range. This subrange is also referred to as the Saltoro Range and is situated within the Karakoram region. The term "Saltoro Kangri" typically encompasses both of its twin peaks, Saltoro Kangri I (located to the south) and Saltoro Kangri II, which are connected by a saddle. When comparing heights, the generic term "Saltoro Kangri" is used for the taller of the two peaks, Saltoro Kangri I. This peak ranks as the 31st highest mountain globally and is located in the remote reaches of the Karakoram. It lies on the Actual Ground Position Line, dividing Indian-controlled territory in the Siachen region from Pakistani-controlled territory to the west of the Saltoro Range.

US maps of the area and many world atlases starting in the 1960s showed the Line of Control between Pakistani and Indian territory running from the last defined point in the 1949 Karachi Agreement, NJ9842, east-northeast to the Karakoram Pass, thus putting the whole of Saltoro Kangri and the entire Siachen Glacier in Pakistan. However, the Simla Agreement defined the Line of Control no further than point NJ9842 other than with the phrase "thence north to the glaciers."

== Climbing history ==
The mountain underwent reconnaissance by Fanny Bullock Workman and her husband in 1911-12. The initial endeavor to conquer the peak, which was then denoted as "Peak 36," took place in 1935, led by a British expedition headed by James Waller and John Hunt. Hunt's involvement in the expedition had been suggested by the Himalayan Club in Calcutta. Among the expedition's members were Rowland Brotherhood and Dr. Steward Carslaw, accompanied by two Sherpas named Palden and Dawa Thondup. Their approach to the mountain commenced from the Likah Glacier, with the objective of ascending the South East ridge. They successfully established a final camp on June 19th, yet their altitude estimation proved to be inaccurate. An attempt to reach the summit the following day, amidst worsening weather conditions, was thwarted as they ere required to ascend an additional 1,100 metres (3,500 feet). Hunt and Brotherhood managed to reach an elevation of 7,500 metres (24,500 ft) but were compelled to turn around.

In 1957, under the leadership of Eric Shipton, a British university expedition approached the mountain via the Bilafond La route, entering from Pakistan and operating under a Pakistani climbing permit. However, they chose not to make a summit attempt. Unintentionally, this expedition marked the initial manoeuvre in the consequential oropolitics dispute over the Siachen conflict, ultimately culminating in the Siachen conflict of 1984.

The first ascent of Saltoro Kangri was in July 1962, by a joint Japanese-Pakistani expedition led by T. Shidei. This piggyback expedition put A. Saito, Y. Takamura and Pakistani climber R.A. Bashir on the top on July 24, following the S.E. ridge route. The peak was again climbed by an Indian Army expedition led by Colonel Narendra Kumar in 1981. The Himalayan Index lists only one more ascent of the mountain, in 1981, and no other attempts.
