= Patrick Cordier (alpinist) =

French mountain climber

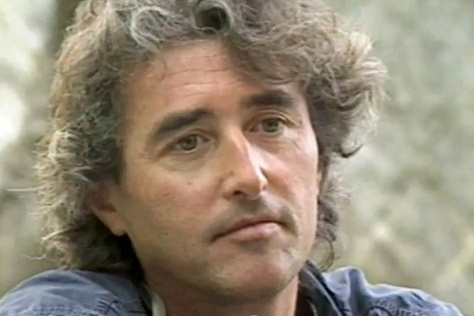
Patrick Cordier

Patrick Cordier (29 December 1946 – 5 June 1996) was a French alpinist. He was killed on 5 June 1996 in a motoring accident riding his motorcycle whilst travelling on the Marseille to Aix-en-Provence motorway.

== Career ==
Born in 1946, Cordier learned to climb at Fontainebleau near his home in Paris. He moved on quickly to the Alps, where he became one of the most recognizable climber of his generation. In 1967 he was a member of the French team that made the first ascent of the French Direct on Norway's Troll Wall. Through the 1970s he climbed many new routes in the Vercors and the Chamonix Aiguilles, the Cordier Pillars on the Grands Charmoz and the Aiguille de Roc bear his name. He climbed, solo, the Nose on El Capitan in America's Yosemite Valley in 1972.

His new route on the East Ridge of the Lepiney was accomplished using new climbing ideas brought back from the US. Cordier climbed further a field making the first ascent of Bubulimoting Spire above the Hunza Valley in the Karakoram. In 1976, Cordier accomplished a solo ascent of the American Direct on the South face of the Fou in the Chamonix Aiguilles. His ascent took three days to accomplish. In 1977, he became a founding member of the Independent Company of Mont Blanc Guides. Now Doctor Cordier, from 1977, he worked as an instructor for the Ecole National de Ski et Alpinisme at Chamonix.
