= Sia Kangri =

Mountain in Karakoram Range

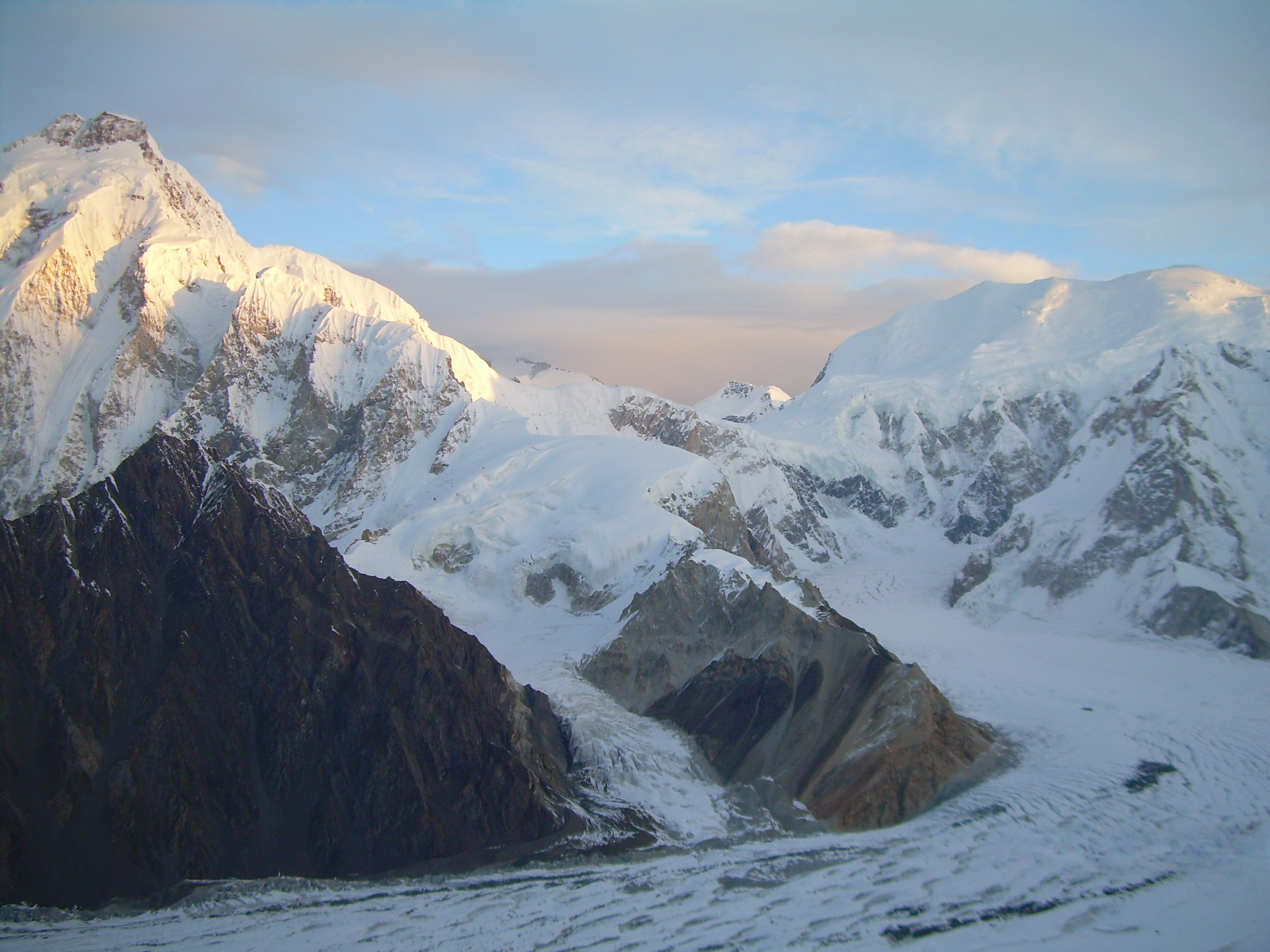
- Sia Kangri at right, above Kondus glacier

Highest point
- Elevation: 7,422 m (24,350 ft); Ranked 63rd
- Prominence: 640 m (2,100 ft)
- Coordinates: 35°39′49″N 76°45′41″E

Geography
- Location within Southern Xinjiang Location within Gilgit Baltistan Location within Ladakh Location within India Location within Pakistan Location within China
- The major peaks in Karakoram are rank identified by height. Legend: 1：K2; 2：Gasherbrum I, K5; 3：Broad Peak; 4：Gasherbrum II, K4; 5：Gasherbrum III, K3a; 6：Gasherbrum IV, K3; 7：Distaghil Sar; 8：Kunyang Chhish; 9：Masherbrum, K1; 10：Batura Sar, Batura I; 11：Rakaposhi; 12：Batura II; 13：Kanjut Sar; 14：Saltoro Kangri, K10; 15：Batura III; 16： Saser Kangri I, K22; 17：Chogolisa; 18：Shispare; 19：Trivor Sar; 20：Skyang Kangri; 21：Mamostong Kangri, K35; 22：Saser Kangri II; 23：Saser Kangri III; 24：Pumari Chhish; 25：Passu Sar; 26：Yukshin Gardan Sar; 27：Teram Kangri I; 28：Malubiting; 29：K12; 30：Sia Kangri; 31：Momhil Sar; 32：Skil Brum; 33：Haramosh Peak; 34：Ghent Kangri; 35：Ultar Sar; 36：Rimo Massif; 37：Sherpi Kangri; 38：Yazghil Dome South; 39：Baltoro Kangri; 40：Crown Peak; 41：Baintha Brakk; 42：Yutmaru Sar; 43：K6; 44：Muztagh Tower; 45：Diran; 46：Apsarasas Kangri I; 47：Rimo III; 48：Gasherbrum V
- Location: Baltistan, Gilgit–Baltistan, Pakistan; Tashkurgan, Xinjiang, China, China–Pakistan border
- Parent range: Baltoro Muztagh

Climbing
- First ascent: 1934 by the International Himalaya Expedition led by Günther Dyhrenfurth

Sia Kangri
- Traditional Chinese: 錫亞康戈里峰
Transcriptions

Sia Kangri (7,422 m, 24,350 ft) is a mountain in the Baltoro Muztagh in the Karakoram. Its summit lies on the border of Pakistan and China. About a kilometer southeast of the Sia Kangri summit is the tri point where territories controlled by India, Pakistan and China meet. Territories on all sides are disputed. The land immediately to the southwest of the peak is claimed by both Pakistan and India and controlled by Pakistan. The land to the northeast is part of the Trans-Karakoram Tract, controlled by China under a 1963 border agreement with Pakistan but claimed by India. The land to the southeast is claimed by Pakistan and India, but controlled by India, as a part of Ladakh. Sia Kangri is the 63rd highest mountain in the world, and the 25th highest in Pakistan. The peak is on the watershed between the Indus River basin and the Tarim Basin. Indira Col which is 3 km to the east is the northernmost point under India's control.

Sia Kangri was first climbed during the 1934 International Himalaya Expedition led by the Swiss-German mountaineer Günter Dyhrenfurth. On 3 August Hans Ertl and Albert Höcht climbing with Günter and his wife Hettie Dyhrenfurth reached the western summit 7,273 m (23,862 ft). Hettie Dyhrenfurth thereby set a women's world altitude record which stood for 20 years. A few days later, on 12 August, Ertl and Höcht "climbed the central, east, and main summits of the Queen Mary group". (At that time Sia Kangri was still referred to by the name Queen Mary Peak, coined by Fanny Bullock Workman in 1912).

Lately, Pakistan has opened Sia Kangri peak for mountaineers and climbers who can obtain permission from Islamabad to summit Sia Kangri.

== See also ==
- Indira Col
- List of highest mountains
- List of mountains in Pakistan
- Saltoro Kangri
