= Gasherbrum I =

11th-highest mountain on Earth

- Hidden Peak
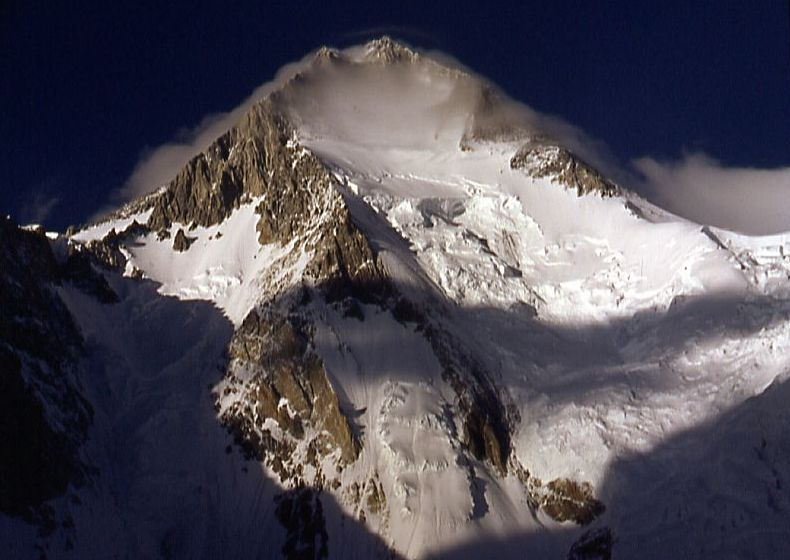
- Gasherbrum I in 2001

Highest point
- Elevation: 8,080 m (26,510 ft); Ranked 11th
- Prominence: 2,155 m (7,070 ft)
- Listing: Eight-thousander; Ultra; List of mountains in China; List of mountains in Pakistan
- Coordinates: 35°43′28″N 76°41′47″E

Geography
- Location within Karakoram Location within Gilgit Baltistan Location within Southern Xinjiang
- The major peaks in Karakoram are rank identified by height. Legend: 1：K2; 2：Gasherbrum I, K5; 3：Broad Peak; 4：Gasherbrum II, K4; 5：Gasherbrum III, K3a; 6：Gasherbrum IV, K3; 7：Distaghil Sar; 8：Kunyang Chhish; 9：Masherbrum, K1; 10：Batura Sar, Batura I; 11：Rakaposhi; 12：Batura II; 13：Kanjut Sar; 14：Saltoro Kangri, K10; 15：Batura III; 16： Saser Kangri I, K22; 17：Chogolisa; 18：Shispare; 19：Trivor Sar; 20：Skyang Kangri; 21：Mamostong Kangri, K35; 22：Saser Kangri II; 23：Saser Kangri III; 24：Pumari Chhish; 25：Passu Sar; 26：Yukshin Gardan Sar; 27：Teram Kangri I; 28：Malubiting; 29：K12; 30：Sia Kangri; 31：Momhil Sar; 32：Skil Brum; 33：Haramosh Peak; 34：Ghent Kangri; 35：Ultar Sar; 36：Rimo Massif; 37：Sherpi Kangri; 38：Yazghil Dome South; 39：Baltoro Kangri; 40：Crown Peak; 41：Baintha Brakk; 42：Yutmaru Sar; 43：K6; 44：Muztagh Tower; 45：Diran; 46：Apsarasas Kangri I; 47：Rimo III; 48：Gasherbrum V
- Location: China–Pakistan border in Gilgit–Baltistan and Xinjiang
- Parent range: Karakoram

Climbing
- First ascent: 5 July 1958 by an American team including two Pakistan army officers; First winter ascent 9 March 2012 Adam Bielecki and Janusz Gołąb

Gasherbrum I, (Note: Balti: རྒ་ཥཱ་བྲུམ་། - ༡, romanized: rgasha brum - 1, lit. 'Beautiful Mountain - 1'; Urdu: گاشر برم - ۱; simplified Chinese: 加舒尔布鲁木I峰; traditional Chinese: 加舒爾布魯木I峰; pinyin: Jiāshūěrbùlǔmù I Fēng) originally surveyed as K5, and also known as Hidden Peak, is the 11th highest mountain in the world at 8,080 metres (26,510 ft) above sea level. It is located between Shigar District in the Gilgit–Baltistan region of Pakistan and Tashkurgan in the Xinjiang province of China. Gasherbrum I is part of the Gasherbrum Massif, located in the Karakoram range.

Gasherbrum is often claimed to mean "Shining Wall", presumably a reference to the highly visible face of the neighboring peak Gasherbrum IV; but in fact, it comes from "rgasha" (beautiful) + "brum" (mountain) in Balti, hence it actually means "beautiful mountain".

Gasherbrum I was designated K5 (meaning the 5th peak of the Karakoram) by T.G. Montgomerie in 1856 when he first spotted the peaks of the Karakoram from more than 200 km away during the Great Trigonometric Survey of India. In 1892, William Martin Conway provided the alternate name, Hidden Peak, in reference to its extreme remoteness, due to which it remains hidden behind anterior peaks of the Gasherbrum group for most of the way along the Baltoro glacier.

Gasherbrum I was first climbed on July 5, 1958, by Pete Schoening and Andy Kauffman of an eight-man American expedition led by Nicholas B. Clinch, Richard K. Irvin, Tom Nevison, Tom McCormack, Bob Swift and Gil Roberts were also members of the team.

== Timeline ==
- 1934 - A large international expedition, organized by the Swiss G.O. Dyhrenfurth, explores Gasherbrum I and II. Two climbers get to 6,300 m (20,670 ft).
- 1936 - A French expedition gets to 6,900 m (22,640 ft).
- 1958 - An American team led by Nicholas Clinch, including the two Pakistani army officers captain Mohammad Akram and captain S.T.H Rizvi, makes the first ascent via Roch ridge.
- 1975 - Reinhold Messner and Peter Habeler reach the summit on a new route (northwest route) in pure alpine style (first time on an 8000-metre peak) taking three days in total. One day later, a team of three led by Austrian Hanns Schell reached the summit on the American route.
- 1977 - The fourth successful ascent by two Slovenians (Nejc Zaplotnik and Andrej Stremfelj), again on a new route. Team member Drago Bregar dies.
- 1980 - Frenchmen Maurice Barrard and Georges Narbaud are successful with the fifth ascent, and pass the South Ridge for the first time.
- 1981 - A Japanese team follows the Clinch route with fixed ropes for the sixth successful ascent.
- 1982 - Michael Dacher, Siegfried Hupfauer and Günter Sturm of a German expedition summit via a new route on the north face. In the same year, French Marie-José Vallençant is the first woman who reaches the summit. Her husband, Sylvain Saudan from Switzerland, performs the first ski descent from the top of an 8000-metre peak to base camp.
- 1983 - Jerzy Kukuczka with Wojciech Kurtyka, new route. Alpine style ascent without the aid of oxygen.
- 1983 - Teams from Switzerland and Spain are successful.
- 1984 - Reinhold Messner and Hans Kammerlander traverse Gasherbrum II and Gasherbrum I without returning to base camp in between.
- 1985 - Solo ascent by Benoît Chamoux. On July 14, the Italian Giampiero Di Federico (solo ascent) opens a new route on the north-west face.
- 1997 - Magnus Rydén and Johan Åkerström reach the summit.
- 2003 - 19 people reach the summit. Four people lose their lives to the mountain, including Mohammad Oraz.
- 2012 - March 9, Adam Bielecki and Janusz Gołąb (Poland) make the first winter ascent. They do so without the aid of supplementary oxygen. The same day, three climbers from a different expedition — Austrian Gerfried Göschl, Swiss Cedric Hählen and Pakistani Nisar Hussain Sadpara — go missing, never to be found again. They were trying to ascend via a new route and are considered to have been blown off by strong winds.
- 2013 - 7 July, Artur Hajzer dies after falling in the Japanese Couloir after an attempt to reach the summit.
- 2013 - 21 July, Spaniards Abel Alonso, Xebi Gomez, and Álvaro Paredes climb to the top, then disappear while descending after a storm.
- 2017 - 30 July, in an alpine style six-day ascent without supplementary oxygen, Czechs Marek 'Mára' Holeček and Zdeněk Hák establish a new route named "Satisfaction!" (in memory of Zdeněk Hrubý) up the Southwest Face.

== See also ==
- List of deaths on Gasherbrum I
- List of mountains in Pakistan
- List of highest mountains on Earth

== Bibliography ==
- Carter, H. Adams (1975). "Balti Place Names in the Karakoram". American Alpine Journal. 49: 53.
- Clinch, Nicholas (December 1982). A Walk in the Sky: Climbing Hidden Peak. Seattle, WA, USA: The Mountaineers. ISBN 0-89886-042-3.
- Fanshawe, Andy; Venables, Stephen (March 1996). Himalaya alpine-style: the most challenging routes on the highest peaks. Seattle, WA, USA: Mountaineers Books. ISBN 0-34064-931-3.
