= Baintha Brakk =

Mountain in Pakistan

Baintha Brakk بائنتھا براک
- The Ogre
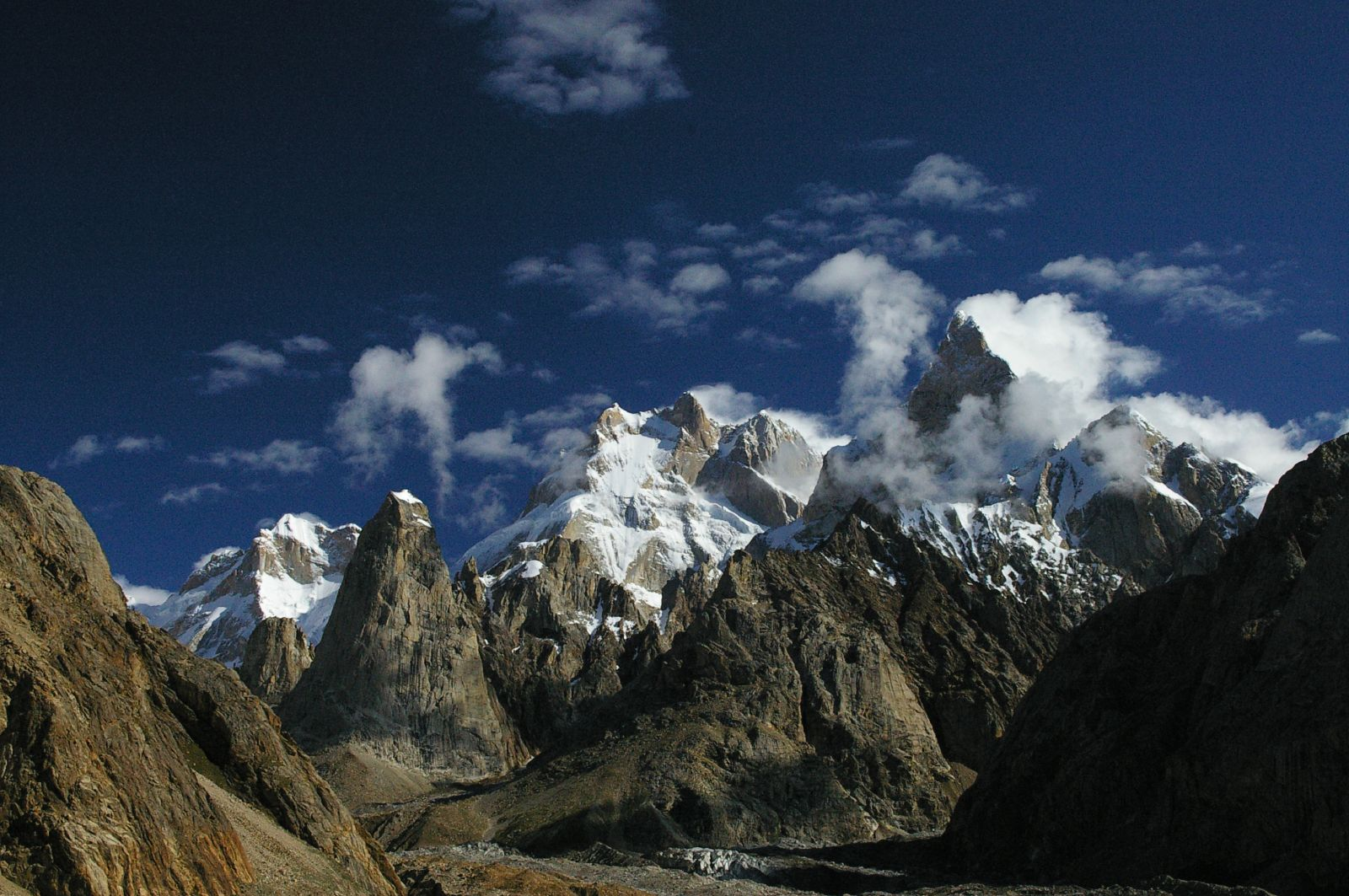
- Baintha Brakk I (center right) and II (far right, clouded), with Ogre's Thumb spire in left foreground

Highest point
- Elevation: 7,285 m (23,901 ft); Ranked 86th
- Prominence: 1,891 m (6,204 ft)
- Listing: Ultra
- Coordinates: 35°56′52″N 75°45′13″E

Geography
- Location within Pakistan Location within Gilgit Baltistan
- The major peaks in Karakoram are rank identified by height. Legend: 1：K2; 2：Gasherbrum I, K5; 3：Broad Peak; 4：Gasherbrum II, K4; 5：Gasherbrum III, K3a; 6：Gasherbrum IV, K3; 7：Distaghil Sar; 8：Kunyang Chhish; 9：Masherbrum, K1; 10：Batura Sar, Batura I; 11：Rakaposhi; 12：Batura II; 13：Kanjut Sar; 14：Saltoro Kangri, K10; 15：Batura III; 16： Saser Kangri I, K22; 17：Chogolisa; 18：Shispare; 19：Trivor Sar; 20：Skyang Kangri; 21：Mamostong Kangri, K35; 22：Saser Kangri II; 23：Saser Kangri III; 24：Pumari Chhish; 25：Passu Sar; 26：Yukshin Gardan Sar; 27：Teram Kangri I; 28：Malubiting; 29：K12; 30：Sia Kangri; 31：Momhil Sar; 32：Skil Brum; 33：Haramosh Peak; 34：Ghent Kangri; 35：Ultar Sar; 36：Rimo Massif; 37：Sherpi Kangri; 38：Yazghil Dome South; 39：Baltoro Kangri; 40：Crown Peak; 41：Baintha Brakk; 42：Yutmaru Sar; 43：K6; 44：Muztagh Tower; 45：Diran; 46：Apsarasas Kangri I; 47：Rimo III; 48：Gasherbrum V; Location in Gilgit-Baltistan
- Location: Gilgit-Baltistan, Pakistan
- Parent range: Panmah Muztagh, Karakoram

Climbing
- First ascent: July 13, 1977 by Doug Scott and Chris Bonington
- Easiest route: snow/ice climb

Baintha Brakk
- Simplified Chinese: 拜塔布拉克峰
Transcriptions

Baintha Brakk (Urdu: بائنتھا براک) or The Ogre is a steep, craggy mountain, 7,285 metres (23,901 ft) high, in the Panmah Muztagh, a subrange of the Karakoram mountain range. It is located in Gilgit-Baltistan, Pakistan. It is famous for being one of the hardest peaks in the world to climb: twenty-four years elapsed between the first ascent in 1977 and the second in 2001.

== Location ==
Baintha Brakk rises above the north side of the Biafo Glacier, one of the major glaciers of the central Karakoram. It lies about 75 kilometres (47 mi) north of Skardu, the major town of the region, and about 30 kilometres (19 mi) north of the roadhead at Askole.

== Notable features ==
Baintha Brakk is exceptional in its combination of altitude, height above local terrain, and steepness. It is a complex granite tower, steeper and rockier than most other Karakoram peaks, although similar to the Latok peaks next to it. For example, its South Face rises over 3,000 m (9,800 ft) above the Uzun Brakk Glacier in only 2 km (1.2 mi) of horizontal distance.

It is because of this steep, rocky nature that Baintha Brakk has been both difficult to climb and attractive, a target for extreme mountaineers.

== Climbing history ==
Following two unsuccessful attempts in 1971 and 1976, the peak was first climbed by two Britons, Doug Scott and Chris Bonington, in 1977. The other members of the party were Mo Anthoine, Clive Rowland, Nick Estcourt, and Tut Braithwaite. Estcourt, Anthoine, and Rowland all reached the lower West Summit at 7,150 m (23,460 ft), while Braithwaite was injured early on by rockfall. They climbed via the Southwest Spur to the West Ridge, and over the west summit to the main summit. The ascent of the summit block required difficult rock climbing that extended the boundaries of what had been done at over 7,000 metres (23,000 ft).

The descent proved more dangerous still: On the first rappel from the summit, Scott broke both legs. Later, Bonington broke two ribs and contracted pneumonia. Also, much of the week-long descent to base camp was in a major storm. However, they were all able to reach base camp, where they had a long wait for assistance.

The second ascent of Baintha Brakk was made by Urs Stöcker, Iwan Wolf, and Thomas Huber, on 21 July 2001, via the South Pillar route, following their first ascent of the subsidiary peak Ogre III (circa 6,800 metres (22,300 ft)). They noted that there were more than 20 unsuccessful expeditions in the interim. Mountain INFO magazine characterized their ascent as "arguably the most notable mountaineering achievement during the entire 2001 season."

A third ascent by a new line on the peak's South Face was made by Americans Kyle Dempster and Hayden Kennedy on August 21, 2012. Compatriot Josh Wharton had also accompanied them on the climb but had to abandon the attempt at approximately 6,800 m (22,300 ft) due to altitude sickness. Earlier in their trip, the two and Slovenian Urban Novak had made another first ascent of a new line on the massive east face of K7 (6,934 metres; 22,749 ft).

== See also ==
- List of mountains in Pakistan
- List of ultras of the Karakoram and Hindu Kush
