= Ghent Kangri =

Mountain in Pakistan/India

- Mount Ghent
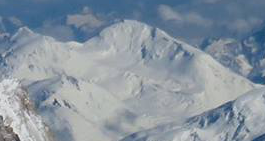
- View of Ghent Kangri from K2. The ridge in the left foreground is part of Gasherbrum IV and in the right part of Baltoro Kangri.

Highest point
- Elevation: 7,401 m (24,281 ft); Ranked 69th
- Prominence: 1,493 m (4,898 ft)
- Coordinates: 35°31′39″N 76°48′39″E

Geography
- Location within Karakoram Location within Gilgit Baltistan Location within Ladakh
- The major peaks in Karakoram are rank identified by height. Legend: 1：K2; 2：Gasherbrum I, K5; 3：Broad Peak; 4：Gasherbrum II, K4; 5：Gasherbrum III, K3a; 6：Gasherbrum IV, K3; 7：Distaghil Sar; 8：Kunyang Chhish; 9：Masherbrum, K1; 10：Batura Sar, Batura I; 11：Rakaposhi; 12：Batura II; 13：Kanjut Sar; 14：Saltoro Kangri, K10; 15：Batura III; 16： Saser Kangri I, K22; 17：Chogolisa; 18：Shispare; 19：Trivor Sar; 20：Skyang Kangri; 21：Mamostong Kangri, K35; 22：Saser Kangri II; 23：Saser Kangri III; 24：Pumari Chhish; 25：Passu Sar; 26：Yukshin Gardan Sar; 27：Teram Kangri I; 28：Malubiting; 29：K12; 30：Sia Kangri; 31：Momhil Sar; 32：Skil Brum; 33：Haramosh Peak; 34：Ghent Kangri; 35：Ultar Sar; 36：Rimo Massif; 37：Sherpi Kangri; 38：Yazghil Dome South; 39：Baltoro Kangri; 40：Crown Peak; 41：Baintha Brakk; 42：Yutmaru Sar; 43：K6; 44：Muztagh Tower; 45：Diran; 46：Apsarasas Kangri I; 47：Rimo III; 48：Gasherbrum V
- Location: Saltoro Ridge, Siachen, near the Actual Ground Position Line (the line between the Indian and Pakistani controlled territories)
- Parent range: Saltoro Mountains, Karakoram

Climbing
- First ascent: 1961 by Wolfgang Axt (Austrian)
- Easiest route: West Ridge: glacier/snow climb

Ghent Kangri
- Simplified Chinese: 根特崗日峰
Transcriptions

Ghent Kangri (or Mount Ghent, Ghaint I) is a high peak near the north end of the Saltoro Mountains, a subrange of the Karakoram range. It is located west of the Siachen Glacier near the Actual Ground Position Line between India and Pakistan.

Ghent Kangri was first climbed on 4 June 1961, by Wolfgang Axt, a member of an Austrian expedition led by Erich Waschak, via the West Ridge. He climbed solo above the high camp.

According to the Himalayan Index, there have been three subsequent ascents of the peak, in 1977, 1980, and 1984.

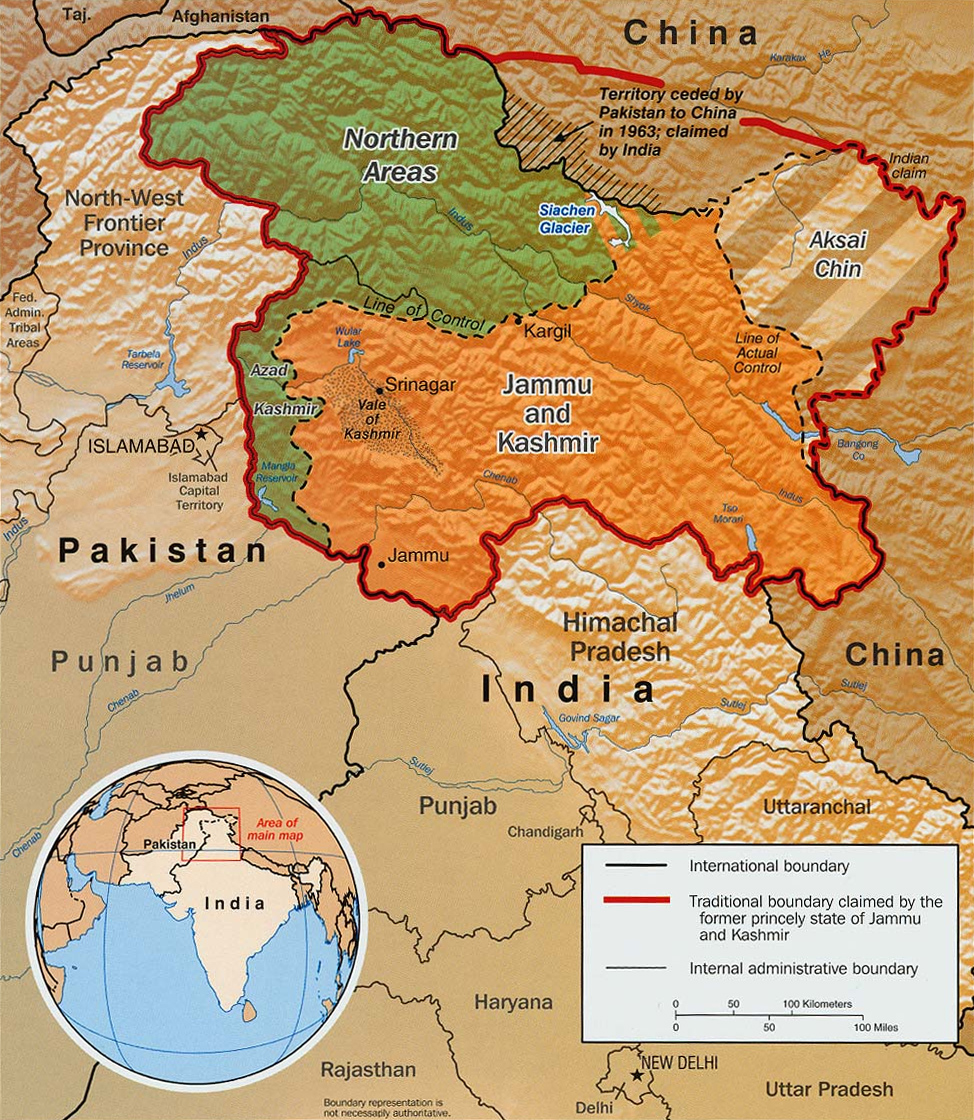
Indo-Pak mutually-agreed undisputed "International Border" (IB) in the black line, Indo-Pak "Line of Control" (LoC) in black dotted line in the north and west, Indo-Sino "Line of Actual" (LAC) in black dotted line in the east, Indo-Pak line across Siachen in north is "Actual Ground Position Line" (AGPL). The areas shown in green are the two Pakistani-controlled areas: Gilgit–Baltistan in the north and Azad Kashmir in the south. The area shown in orange is the Indian-controlled territories of Jammu and Kashmir, and Ladakh, and the diagonally-hatched area to the east is the Chinese-controlled area known as Aksai Chin. "Territories ceded by Pakistan to China claimed by India" in the north is Shaksgam (Trans-Karakoram Tract).

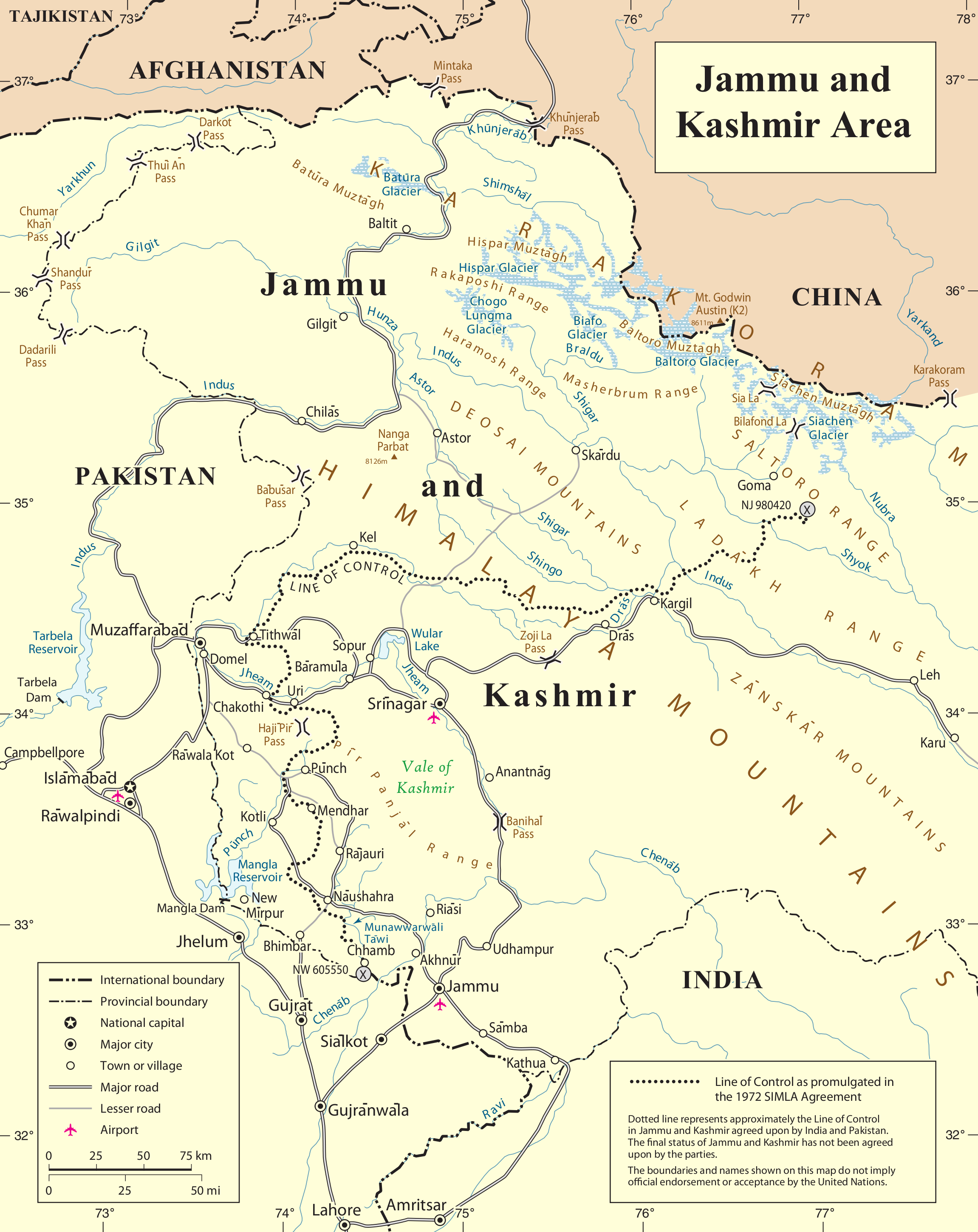
United Nations map of Siachen Glacier showing "Point NJ980420" (Point NJ9842) as starting point of "Actual Ground Position Line" (AGPL), Goma military camp of Pakistan, Nubra River valley and Siachen glaciers held by India; Bilafond La and Sia La north of NJ9842 are also held by India. Masherbrum Range, Baltoro Glacier, Baltoro Glacier, Baltoro Muztagh and K2 are held by Pakistan.

== See also ==
Near the AGPL (Actual Ground Position Line)

- NJ9842, LoC ends and AGPL begins
- Gyong La
- Chumik Glacier
- Saltoro Mountains
- Saltoro Kangri
- Bilafond La
- Sia La
- Indira Col, AGPL ends at LAC

Borders

- Actual Ground Position Line (AGPL)
- India–Pakistan International Border (IB)
- Line of Control (LoC)
- Line of Actual Control (LAC)
- Sir Creek (SC)
- Borders of China
- Borders of India
- Borders of Pakistan

Conflicts

- Kashmir conflict
- Siachen conflict
- Sino-Indian conflict
- List of disputed territories of China
- List of disputed territories of India
- List of disputed territories of Pakistan
- Northern Areas
- Trans-Karakoram Tract

Operations

- Operation Meghdoot, by India
- Operation Rajiv, by India
- Operation Safed Sagar, by India

Other related topics

- Awards and decorations of the Indian Armed Forces
- Bana Singh, after whom Quaid Post was renamed to Bana Top
- Dafdar, westernmost town in Trans-Karakoram Tract
- India-China Border Roads
- Sino-Pakistan Agreement for transfer of Trans-Karakoram Tract to China

== Sources ==
- Neate, Jill (1989). High Asia: An Illustrated History of the 7000 Metre Peaks. Seattle: The Mountaineers. ISBN 0-89886-238-8.
- Jerzy Wala, Orographical Sketch Map of the Karakoram, Swiss Foundation for Alpine Research, 1990.
