= Teram Kangri =

Mountain in China/India

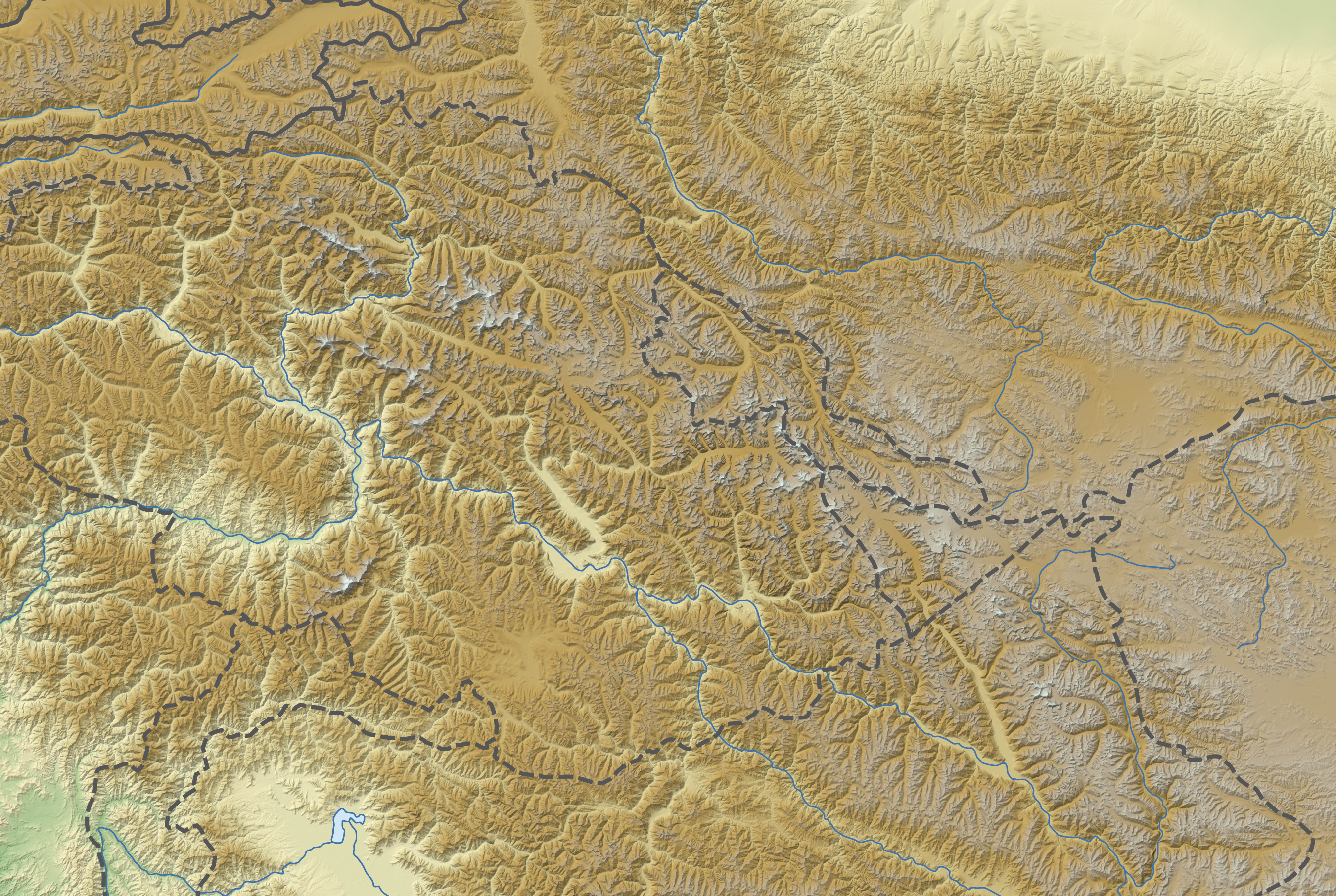
- Location within Karakoram Location within Ladakh Location within India Location within Southern Xinjiang Location within China
- The major peaks in Karakoram are rank identified by height. Legend: 1：K2; 2：Gasherbrum I, K5; 3：Broad Peak; 4：Gasherbrum II, K4; 5：Gasherbrum III, K3a; 6：Gasherbrum IV, K3; 7：Distaghil Sar; 8：Kunyang Chhish; 9：Masherbrum, K1; 10：Batura Sar, Batura I; 11：Rakaposhi; 12：Batura II; 13：Kanjut Sar; 14：Saltoro Kangri, K10; 15：Batura III; 16： Saser Kangri I, K22; 17：Chogolisa; 18：Shispare; 19：Trivor Sar; 20：Skyang Kangri; 21：Mamostong Kangri, K35; 22：Saser Kangri II; 23：Saser Kangri III; 24：Pumari Chhish; 25：Passu Sar; 26：Yukshin Gardan Sar; 27：Teram Kangri I; 28：Malubiting; 29：K12; 30：Sia Kangri; 31：Momhil Sar; 32：Skil Brum; 33：Haramosh Peak; 34：Ghent Kangri; 35：Ultar Sar; 36：Rimo Massif; 37：Sherpi Kangri; 38：Yazghil Dome South; 39：Baltoro Kangri; 40：Crown Peak; 41：Baintha Brakk; 42：Yutmaru Sar; 43：K6; 44：Muztagh Tower; 45：Diran; 46：Apsarasas Kangri I; 47：Rimo III; 48：Gasherbrum V; Location of the Teram Kangri within the greater Karakoram region

Highest point
- Elevation: 7,462 m (24,482 ft); Ranked 56th
- Prominence: 1,702 m (5,584 ft)
- Listing: Ultra
- Coordinates: 35°34′48″N 77°04′42″E

Geography
- Location: Ladakh, India, Xinjiang, China
- Parent range: Siachen Muztagh (Karakoram)

Climbing
- First ascent: 1975 by K. Kodaka and Y. Kobayashi (Japanese)
- Easiest route: glacier/snow/ice climb

Teram Kangri
- Simplified Chinese: 特拉木坎力峰
Transcriptions

The Teram Kangri group is a mountain massif in the remote Siachen Muztagh, a subrange of the Karakoram range. The high point of the group, and of the Siachen Muztagh, is Teram Kangri I. The peak lies on the boundary between disputed China controlled Trans-Karakoram Tract and the disputed Siachen Glacier section controlled by India. The northeast side of the peak is in Chinese-controlled territory, the southwest side is controlled by India.

The name Teram Kangri is derived from a Yarkandi legend about a large town which was said to lie at the site of the Teram Shehr glacier. It was named by Tom Longstaff in 1909 when he saw it from the Bilafond La (which lies a few km SW of the peak).

View from space of Teram Kangri Group
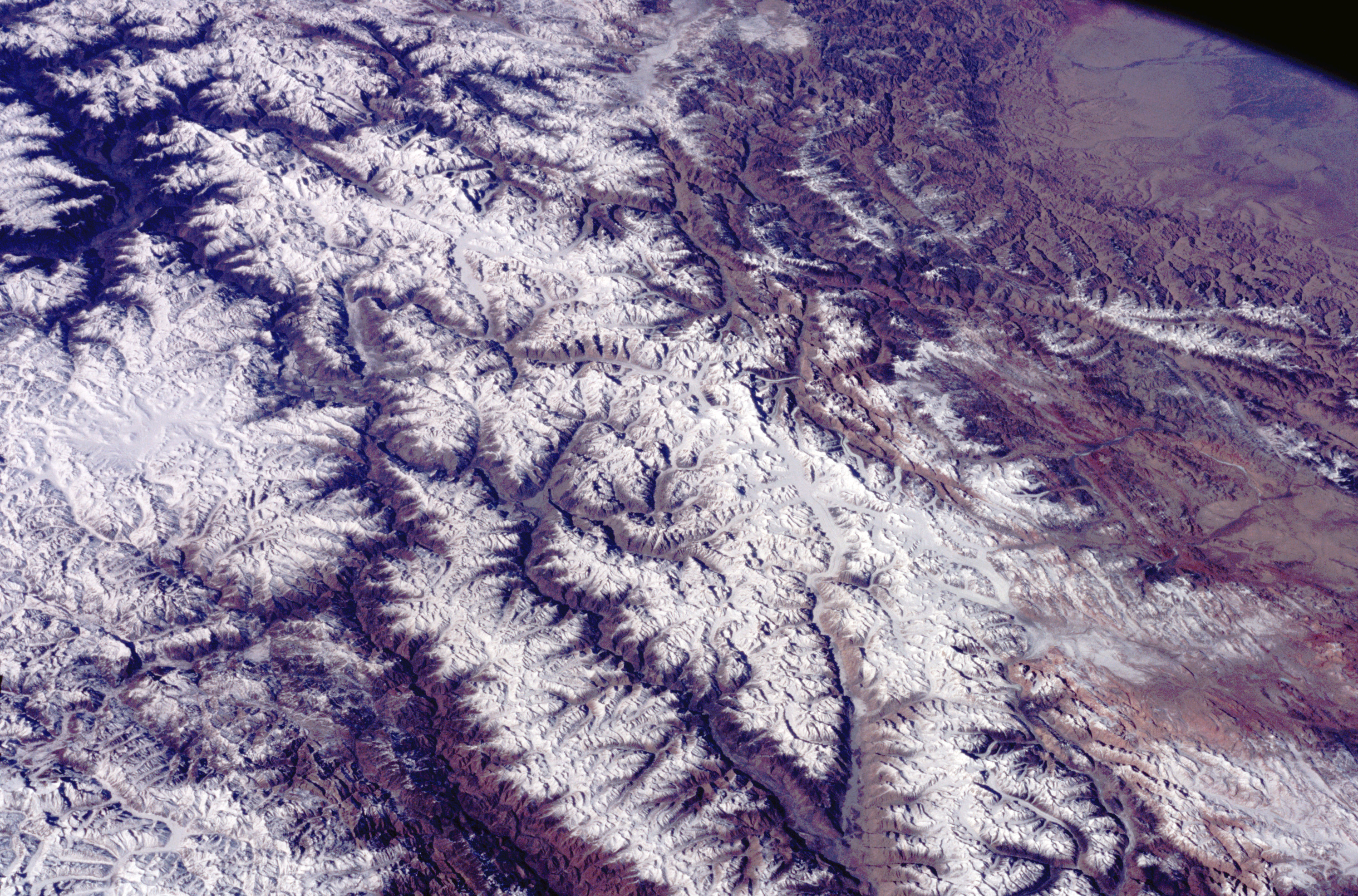

== Climbing history ==
Teram Kangri I was first climbed on August 12, 1975, by a Japanese expedition led by H. Katayama, which obtained a permit from the Government of Pakistan and made the long approach via Bilafond La (the Saltoro Pass). They climbed the SW ridge of Teram Kangri II and then took the East ridge to the top. Teram Kangri II was climbed on August 12 and 13 by six Japanese climbers.

Teram Kangri II (7,407 m) was climbed in 1978 by an Indian Army expedition led by Colonel Narendra Kumar in the first move by India to lay claim to the Siachen Glacier area. Teram Kangri I has been climbed once since, in 1992. The expedition approached through Indian territory.

Teram Kangri III 35°35′59″N 77°02′53″E (7,382 m ranked 73rd, Prominence = 500 m) was first climbed in 1979 by a Japanese expedition led by S. Hanada. Their route crossed over Bilafond La, much like the first ascent of Teram Kangri I.

== Sources ==
- Wala, Jerzy Orographical Sketch Map of the Karakoram, Swiss Foundation for Alpine Research, Zurich, 1990.
- Neate, Jill (1989). High Asia: An Illustrated History of the 7000 Metre Peaks. Seattle: The Mountaineers. ISBN 0-89886-238-8.
- Himalayan Index
