= Chogolisa =

Mountain in Pakistan

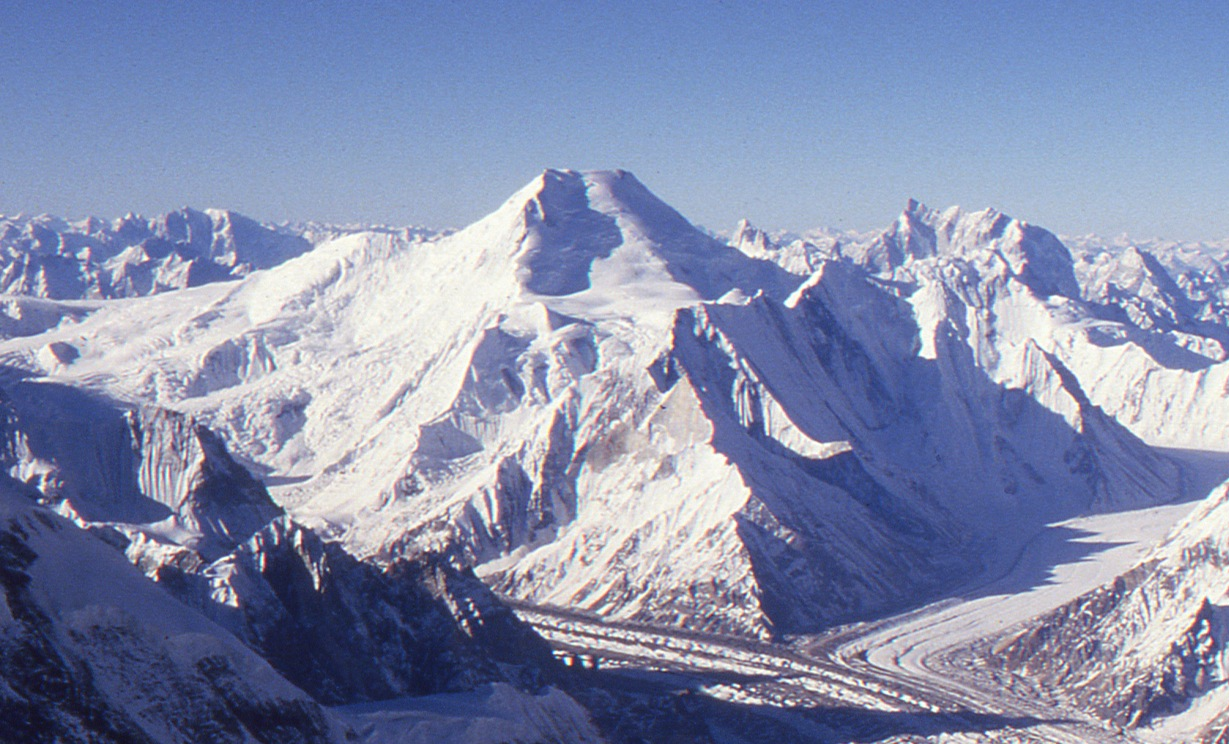
- Chogolisa seen from the "shoulder" of K2

Highest point
- Elevation: 7,665 m (25,148 ft); Ranked 36th
- Prominence: 1,624 m (5,328 ft)
- Listing: Mountains of Pakistan; Ultra
- Coordinates: 35°36′51″N 76°34′45″E

Naming
- Native name: چوگولیزا (Urdu)
- English translation: Great Hunt

Geography
- Location within Pakistan Location within Gilgit Baltistan
- The major peaks in Karakoram are rank identified by height. Legend: 1：K2; 2：Gasherbrum I, K5; 3：Broad Peak; 4：Gasherbrum II, K4; 5：Gasherbrum III, K3a; 6：Gasherbrum IV, K3; 7：Distaghil Sar; 8：Kunyang Chhish; 9：Masherbrum, K1; 10：Batura Sar, Batura I; 11：Rakaposhi; 12：Batura II; 13：Kanjut Sar; 14：Saltoro Kangri, K10; 15：Batura III; 16： Saser Kangri I, K22; 17：Chogolisa; 18：Shispare; 19：Trivor Sar; 20：Skyang Kangri; 21：Mamostong Kangri, K35; 22：Saser Kangri II; 23：Saser Kangri III; 24：Pumari Chhish; 25：Passu Sar; 26：Yukshin Gardan Sar; 27：Teram Kangri I; 28：Malubiting; 29：K12; 30：Sia Kangri; 31：Momhil Sar; 32：Skil Brum; 33：Haramosh Peak; 34：Ghent Kangri; 35：Ultar Sar; 36：Rimo Massif; 37：Sherpi Kangri; 38：Yazghil Dome South; 39：Baltoro Kangri; 40：Crown Peak; 41：Baintha Brakk; 42：Yutmaru Sar; 43：K6; 44：Muztagh Tower; 45：Diran; 46：Apsarasas Kangri I; 47：Rimo III; 48：Gasherbrum V; Location in Gilgit-Baltistan
- Location: Gilgit–Baltistan, Pakistan
- Parent range: Karakoram

Climbing
- First ascent: August 2, 1975 (Chogolisa I); 1958 (Chogolisa II)
- Easiest route: Rock/snow/ice climb

Chogolisa
- Traditional Chinese: 喬戈里薩峰
- Simplified Chinese: 乔戈里萨峰
Transcriptions

Chogolisa (Urdu: چوگولیزا derived from Chogo Ling Sa; literally "Great Hunt") is a trapezoidal mountain located in the Karakoram range within the Gilgit-Baltistan region of Pakistan. It is situated near the Baltoro Glacier in the Concordia region, which is renowned for hosting some of the world's tallest peaks.

Chogolisa has several peaks, the highest being its southwest face (Chogolisa I), which reaches an elevation of 7,665 metres (25,148 ft). On the northeast side, the second-highest peak stands at 7,654 m (25,112 ft) in height and was named "Bride Peak" by Martin Conway in 1892.

== Climbing history ==
In 1909, a party led by Duke of the Abruzzi reached 7,498 m (24,600 ft) from a base camp located on the northern side and a high camp on the Chogolisa saddle at 6,335 m. Bad weather stopped the party from ascending further, but their climb established a new world altitude record which was not beaten until 13 years later, when Mallory, Norton and Somervell reached 8,200 m (26,903 ft) on the 1922 British Mount Everest expedition.

Austrian mountaineers Hermann Buhl and Kurt Diemberger attempted Chogolisa in 1957 after they had successfully summitted Broad Peak behind Marcus Schmuck and Fritz Wintersteller a few weeks earlier. On June 25, they left camp I and camped in a saddle at 6,706 m on the southeast ridge. On June 27, a sudden snowstorm forced them to retreat less than 2000ft from the summit and, on the descent, Buhl broke off a big cornice and fell into the mountain's near vertical north face. His body has never been found.

On August 4, 1958, a Japanese expedition from the Academic Alpine Club Kyoto University led by Takeo Kuwabara (桑原武夫) made the first ascent of Chogolisa II, placing Masao Fujihira and Kazumasa Hirai on top.

The first ascent of Chogolisa I was made on August 2, 1975, by Fred Pressl and Gustav Ammerer of an Austrian expedition led by Eduard Koblmueller. Koblmueller almost suffered the same fate as Buhl, as he also fell through a snow cornice on the ascent, but he was roped and team members were able to pull him to safety.

== See also ==
- List of highest mountains
- List of ultras of the Karakoram and Hindu Kush
