= Hunza Peak =

Mountain in Gilgit-Baltistan (Pakistan)

Hunza Peak ہنزہ چوٹی
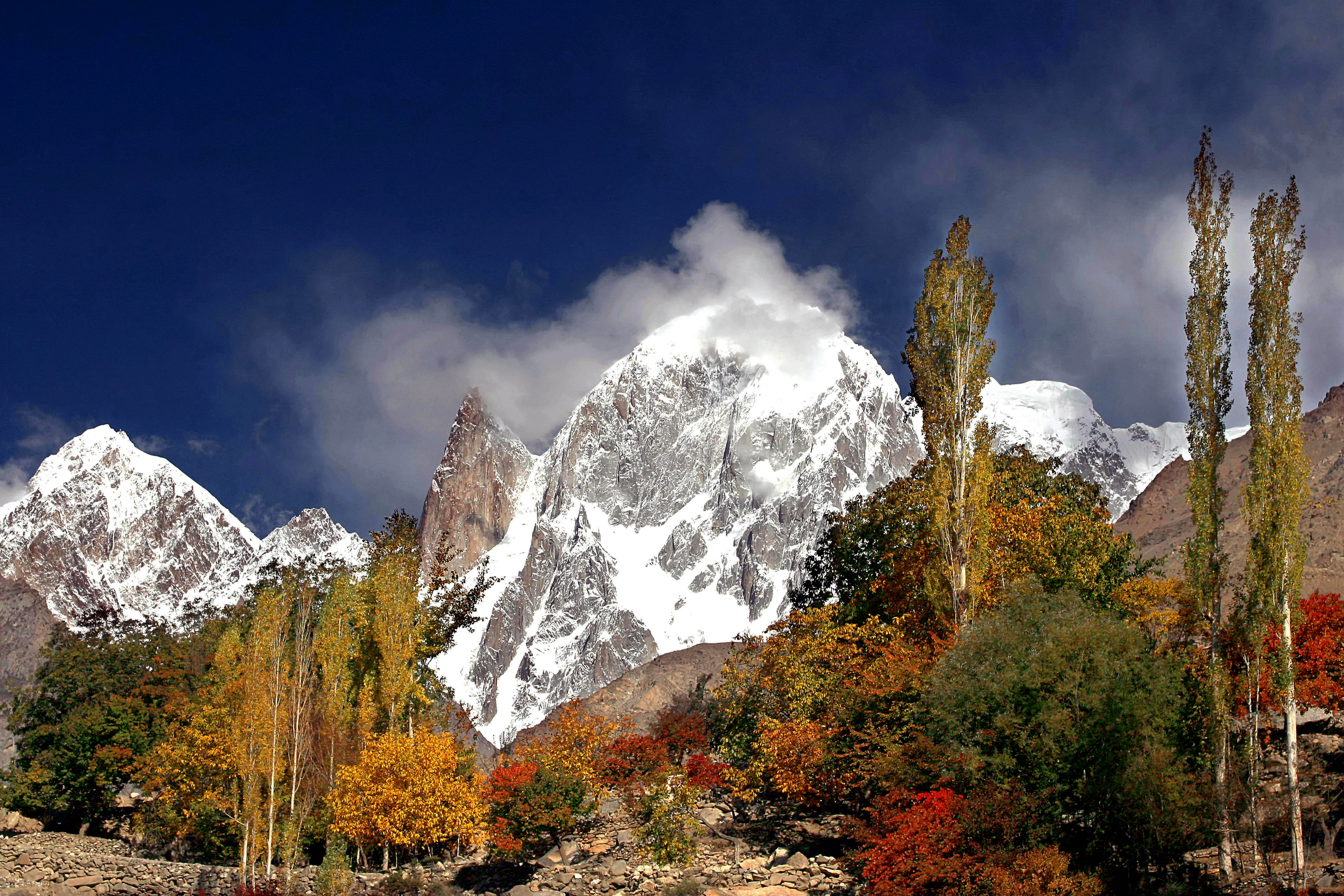
- Hunza Peak (center) and Bublimating (rock spire, left)

Highest point
- Elevation: 6,270 m (20,570 ft)
- Listing: Mountains of Pakistan
- Coordinates: 36°22′12″N 74°39′00″E (Note: These are the coordinates of the Bublimating peak.)

Geography
- Country: Pakistan
- Region: Gilgit-Baltistan
- Parent range: Batura Muztagh, Karakoram

Hunza Peak (Urdu: ہنزہ چوٹی) lies in the westernmost subrange of the Karakoram range in Pakistan, along with the Ladyfinger Peak (Bublimating). It lies on the southwest ridge of the Ultar Sar massif, the most southeasterly of the major groups of the Batura Muztagh. The whole massif rises precipitously above the Hunza Valley to the southeast.

This peak has at least two known routes, both first climbed in 1991. Both routes were done in alpine style, the first by a Swedish expedition and the second by a British team, which included Caradog Jones and Mick Fowler.

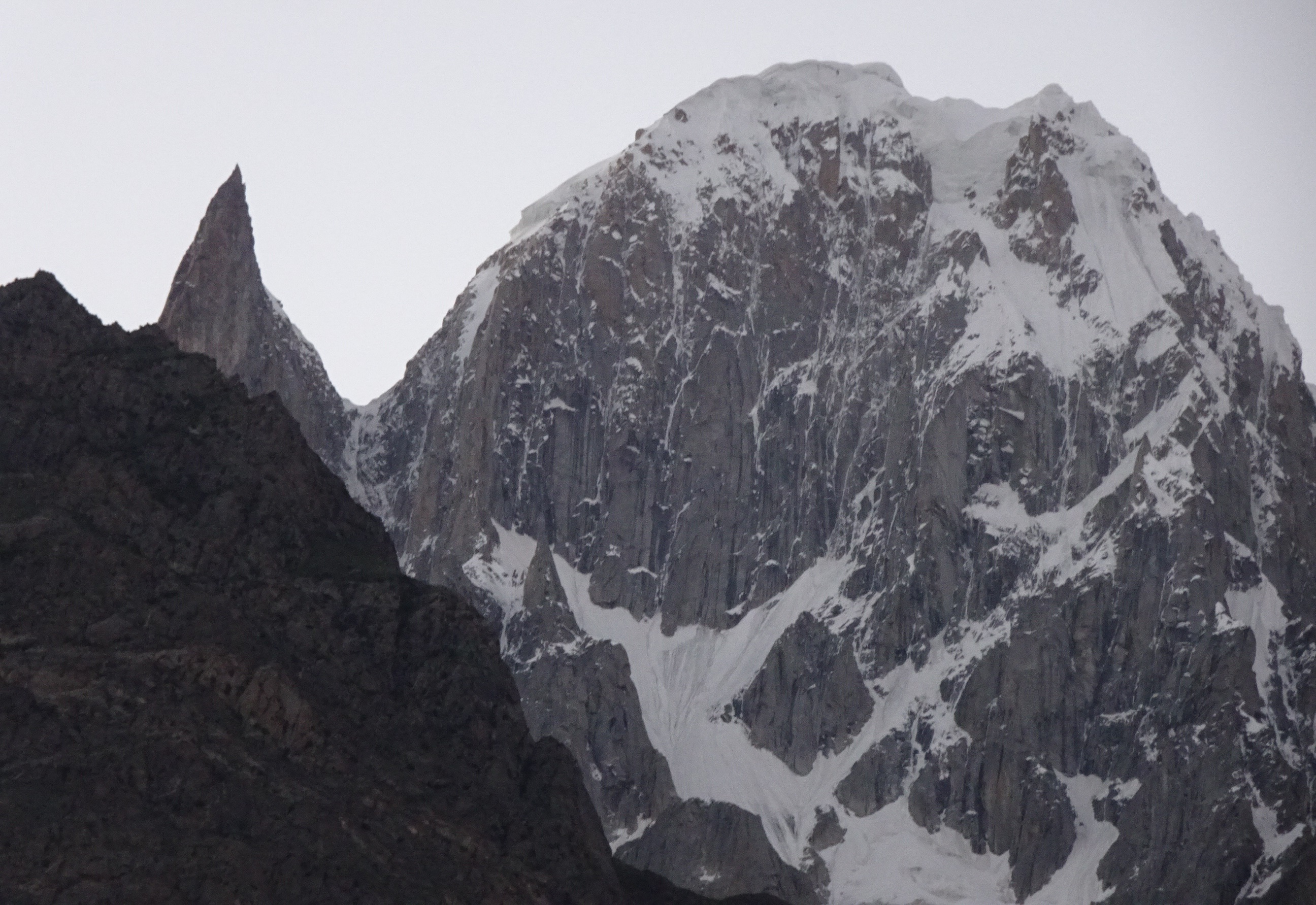
Close-up of Bublimotin Ladyfinger and Hunza Peak

While nearby Ladyfinger Peak has little prominence above the saddle with Hunza Peak, it is a sharp, relatively snowless rock spire among the peaks around it.

== See also ==
- Highest Mountains of the World
