= Ladyfinger Peak =

Rock spire in the Western Karakoram, Pakistan

Lady Finger Peak لیڈی فنگر
- Bublimotin
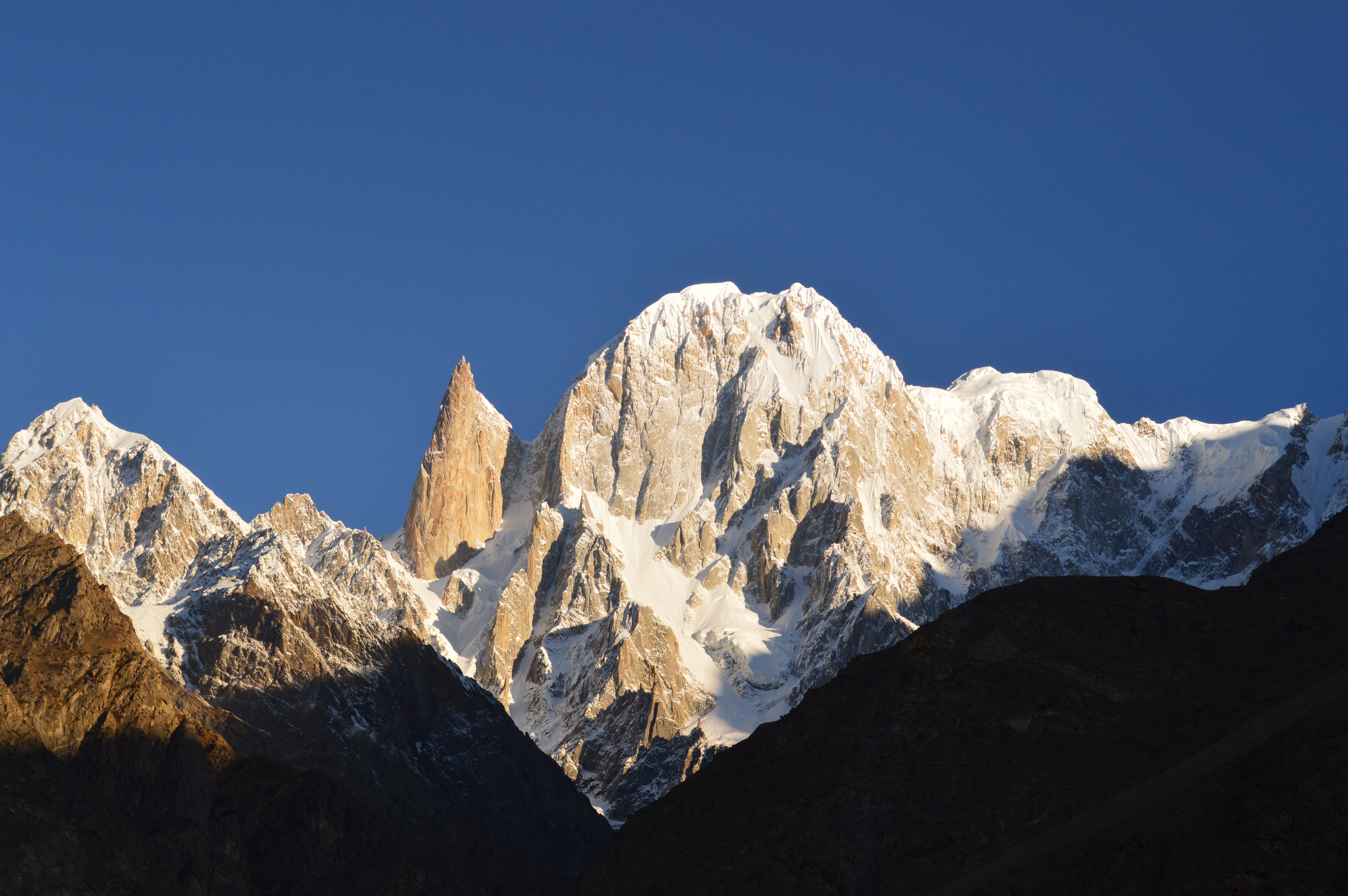
- Ladyfinger peak is the sharp peak in the centre-left

Highest point
- Elevation: 6,000 m (20,000 ft) (Note: This elevation is approximate.)
- Prominence: < 200 m
- Listing: Mountains of Pakistan
- Coordinates: 36°22′12″N 74°39′00″E

Geography
- Location within Gilgit Baltistan Location within Pakistan
- Country: Pakistan
- Region: Gilgit-Baltistan
- District: Gilgit
- Parent range: Batura Muztagh, Karakoram

Climbing
- First ascent: May 22, 1982 by Patrick Cordier and Jacques Maurin
- Easiest route: East Ridge

The Bublimotin, Bubli Motin, Bublimating or Ladyfinger Peak (Urdu: لیڈی فنگر), is a distinctive rock spire in the Batura Muztagh, the westernmost subrange of the Karakoram range in Pakistan. It lies on the southwest ridge of the Ultar Sar massif, the most southeasterly of the major groups of the Batura Muztagh. The whole massif rises precipitously above the Hunza Valley to the southeast.

Bublimotin is a sharp, relatively snowless, rock spire among the nearby peaks, although it has little prominence above the saddle with nearby Hunza Peak. It provides a 6,000-metre (20,000 ft) rock climb (with a very serious alpine approach) and has been the scene of some notable paragliding.

An interesting folk tale about the peak (Bubli mo Ting, literally meaning 'Bubli's peak') is that Kisar, a (magical) prince from Baltistan, came to Hunza on one of his adventures and married a princess, a gas, called Bubli. When he received news that his first wife in Baltistan, Langabrumo, had been kidnapped (by a phut or a deu, one story says, but according to Lorimer's book it is a king from another country), he immediately made preparations to set off and rescue her. He took Bubli up to this mountain, (later named after her), and handed her a sack of grain as well as a hen or chicken (a qarqamuts). She must have asked whether – and when – he would be back and he told her: "Every year give this chicken a single grain to eat. When the sack is empty, I will return. Until that time, stay here." He left, and, they say, Bubli is waiting there still.

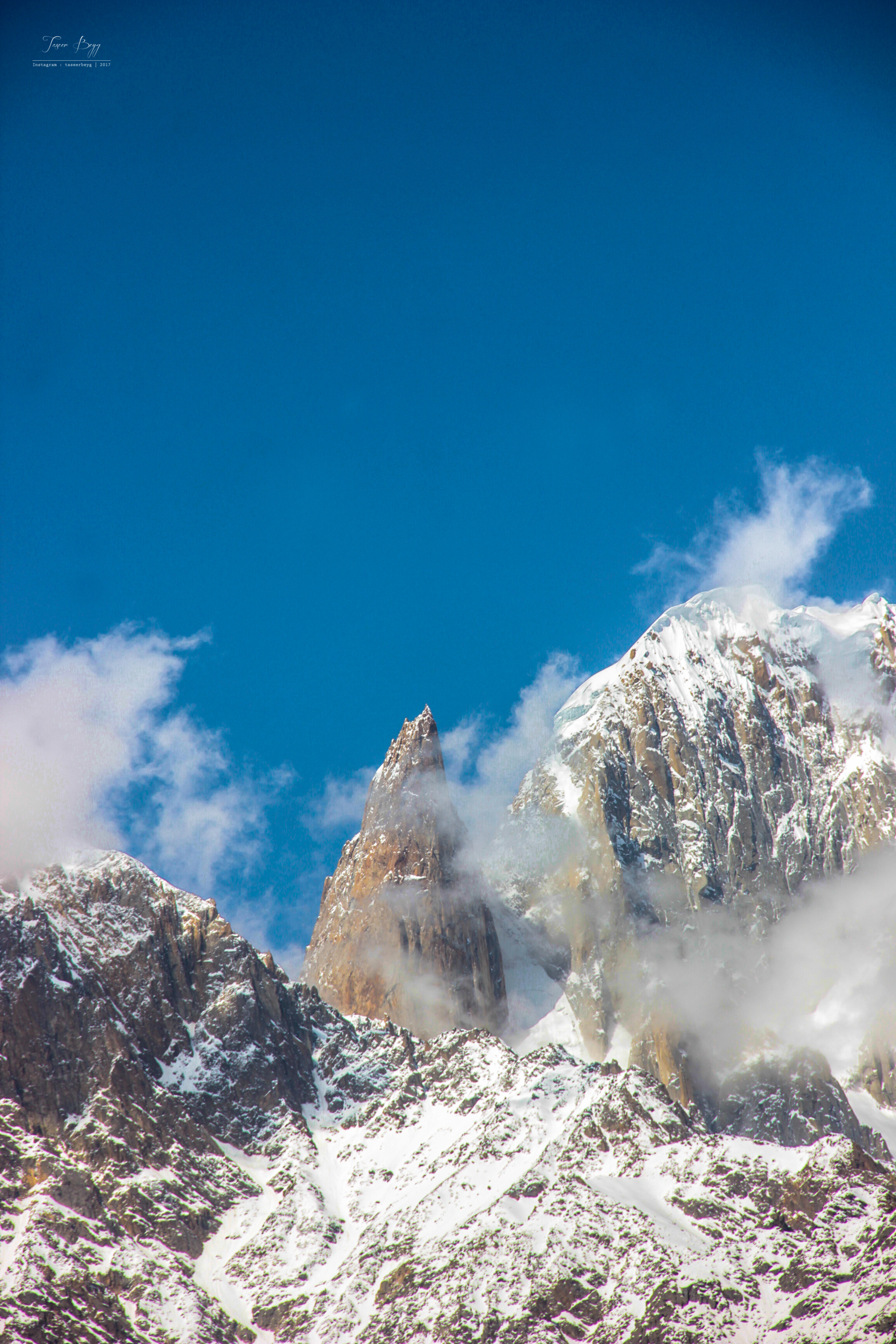
Close-up of Ladyfinger Peak

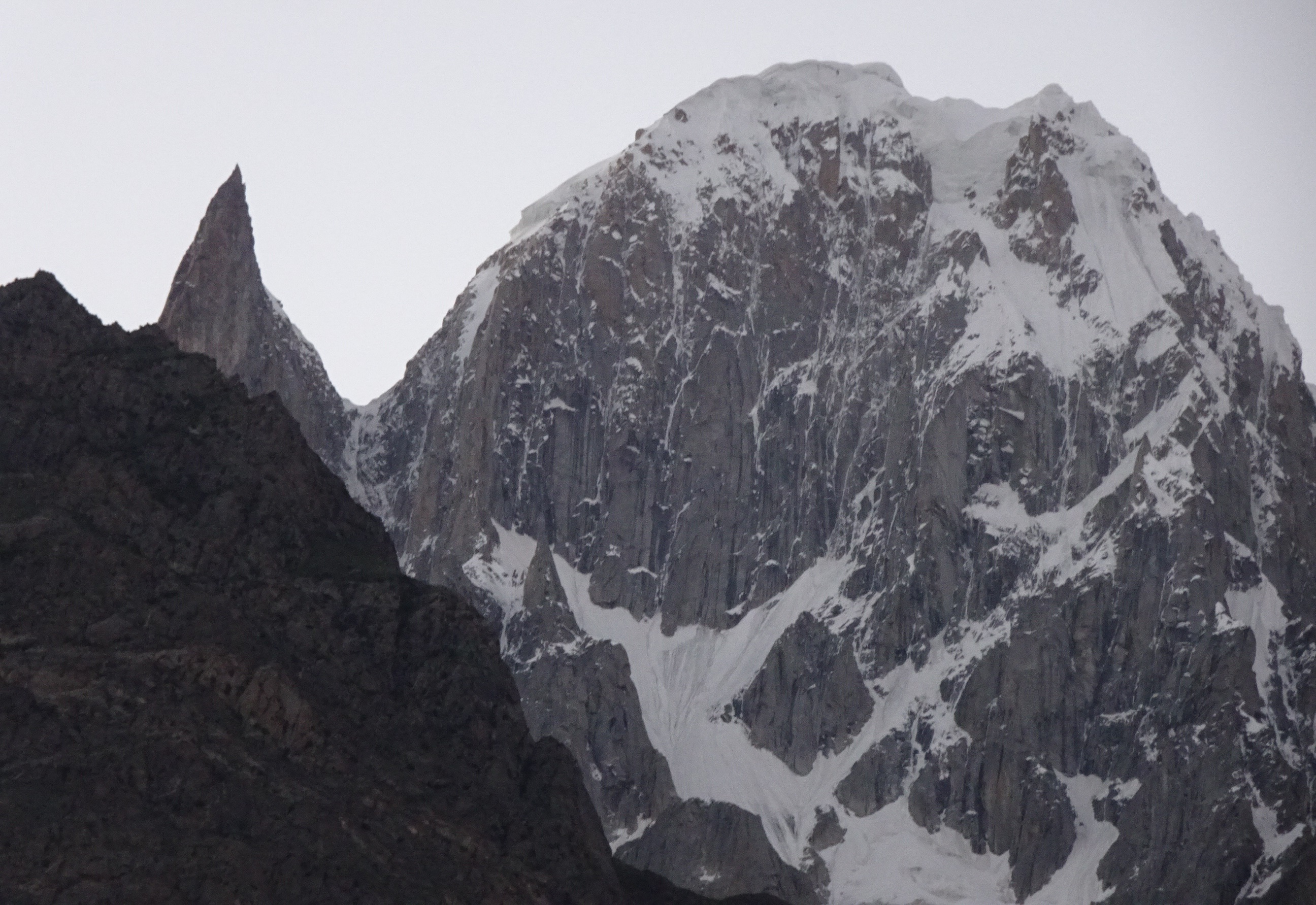
Ladyfinger and Hunza Peak

== See also ==
- Highest mountains of the World

== Sources ==
- Jerzy Wala, Orographical Sketch Map of the Batura Muztagh, 1988.
- Himalayan Index
- Climbs and Expeditions:Pakistan, The American Alpine Journal (1997), pp. 306 – 331
