= Distaghil Sar =

Mountain in Pakistan

Disteghil Sar
- Location within Pakistan Location within Gilgit Baltistan
- The major peaks in Karakoram are rank identified by height. Legend: 1：K2; 2：Gasherbrum I, K5; 3：Broad Peak; 4：Gasherbrum II, K4; 5：Gasherbrum III, K3a; 6：Gasherbrum IV, K3; 7：Distaghil Sar; 8：Kunyang Chhish; 9：Masherbrum, K1; 10：Batura Sar, Batura I; 11：Rakaposhi; 12：Batura II; 13：Kanjut Sar; 14：Saltoro Kangri, K10; 15：Batura III; 16： Saser Kangri I, K22; 17：Chogolisa; 18：Shispare; 19：Trivor Sar; 20：Skyang Kangri; 21：Mamostong Kangri, K35; 22：Saser Kangri II; 23：Saser Kangri III; 24：Pumari Chhish; 25：Passu Sar; 26：Yukshin Gardan Sar; 27：Teram Kangri I; 28：Malubiting; 29：K12; 30：Sia Kangri; 31：Momhil Sar; 32：Skil Brum; 33：Haramosh Peak; 34：Ghent Kangri; 35：Ultar Sar; 36：Rimo Massif; 37：Sherpi Kangri; 38：Yazghil Dome South; 39：Baltoro Kangri; 40：Crown Peak; 41：Baintha Brakk; 42：Yutmaru Sar; 43：K6; 44：Muztagh Tower; 45：Diran; 46：Apsarasas Kangri I; 47：Rimo III; 48：Gasherbrum V; Pakistan

Highest point
- Elevation: 7,885 m (25,869 ft); Ranked 19th
- Prominence: 2,525 m (8,284 ft)
- Listing: Mountains of Pakistan; Ultra
- Coordinates: 36°19′33″N 75°11′18″E

Naming
- Native name: دستاغل سر

Geography
- Location: Nazimabad Shishkat, Gilgit-Baltistan region, Pakistan
- Parent range: Hispar Muztagh, Karakoram

Climbing
- First ascent: 9 June 1960 by Günther Stärker and Diether Marchart of an Austrian team
- Easiest route: Glacier/snow/ice climb

Distaghil Sar
- Simplified Chinese: 迪斯特吉峰
Transcriptions

Disteghil Sar or Distaghil Sar (Note: Urdu: دستاغل سر; Burushaski: دستݵغل سر, lit. 'Sheephold in the hills') is the highest mountain in the Baltin Bar Nallah Shishkat, Hunza. It is part of the Karakoram mountain range in Gilgit-Baltistan, Pakistan. It is the 19th-highest mountain on Earth, the 7th-highest in Pakistan, and the first of the high peaks after Shishapangma to be the tallest independent summit of its own subrange. The mountain has a 3-kilometre-long (1.9 mi) top ridge above 7,400 meters elevation, with three distinct summits: Northwest, 7,885 m; Central, 7,760 m; and Southeast, 7,696m or 7,535m.

== Etymology ==
The name "Disteghil Sar" literally means "Sheepfold in the Hills" in the local language of Hunza, Burushaski.

== Climbing history ==
The first recorded attempt to climb Distaghil Sar was made in 1957 by an English expedition led by Alf Gregory. That team attempted to climb the mountain from the south and the west, they reached 21,300 feet (6,500 m) but were defeated by bad weather. Unfavourable weather also foiled a 1959 Swiss attempt over the southeast ridge led by Raymond Lambert.

The first successful ascent was made in 1960 by Günther Stärker and Diether Marchart who were part of an Austrian expedition led by Wolfgang Stefan. The expedition climbed the western part of the south face and continued over the southwest ridge to reach the highest summit on 9 June.

The eastern summit is independent of the main, western, summit and about 100m lower; it was first climbed over the east face in 1980 by a Polish expedition which included Tadeusz Piotrowski. All participants of the expedition reached the summit. It was reascended in 1983.

It was more than 20 years before a second successful ascent of the highest, western summit. The Himalayan Index lists another ascent of the peak in 1980 and a Spanish team made an ascent in 1982 by following a route close to the one taken in 1960.

Two attempts over the daunting north face, in 1988 and 1998, were unsuccessful.

An attempt on the north ridge in 2008 was abandoned soon after the party arrived because dramatic changes to the terrain, which had occurred over the previous ten years or so, had resulted in conditions becoming extremely dangerous.

== See also ==
- List of highest mountains on Earth
- List of ultras of the Karakoram and Hindu Kush

== Sources ==
- Hohe Siebentausender (in German)
- The Himalayan Index
