= Batura Sar =

Mountain in Pakistan

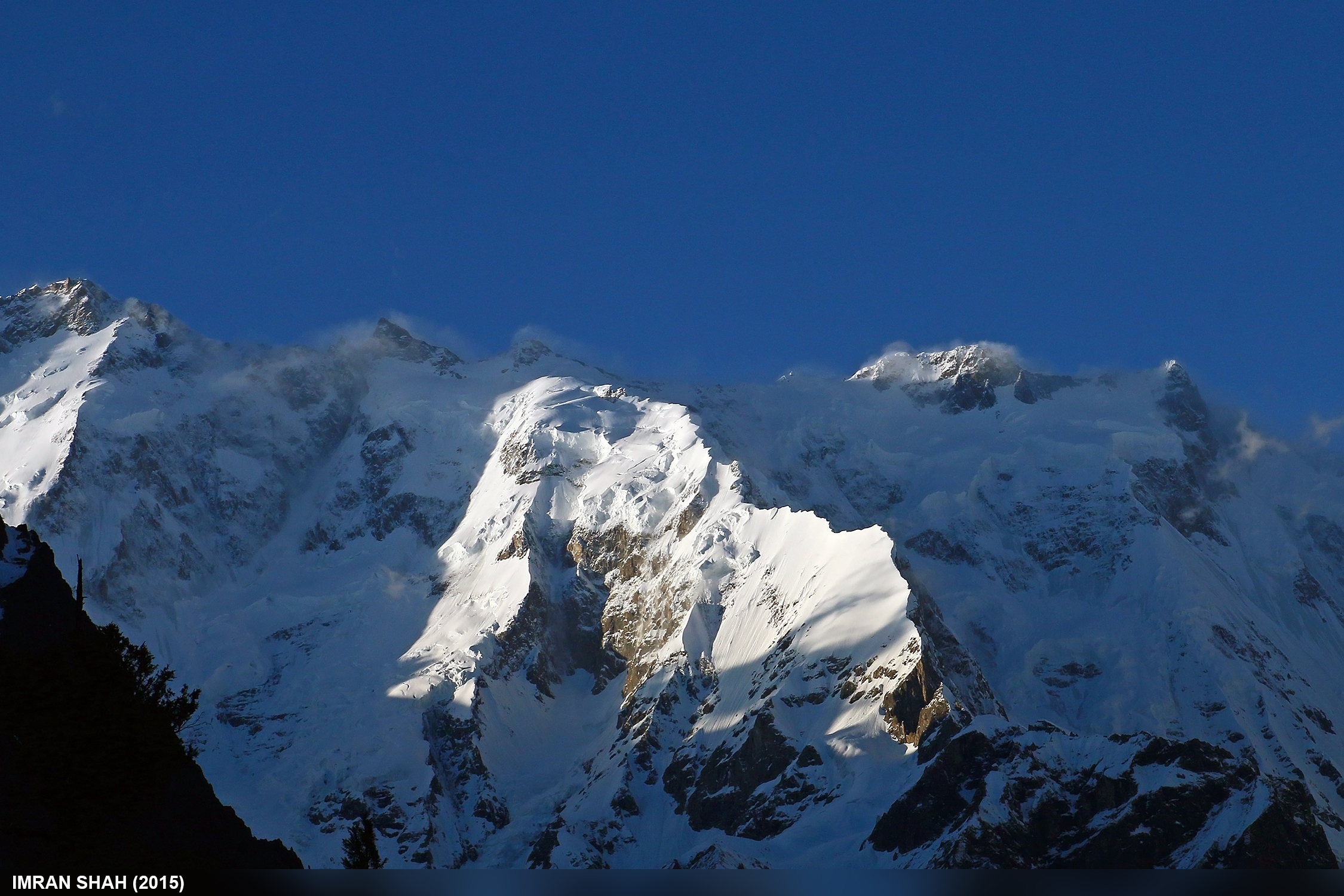
- Batura I is to the left, Batura V is next in shadow, Batura VI is in shadow above the sunlight slope, and to the right distance Muchu Chhish catches the sun.

Highest point
- Elevation: 7,795 m (25,574 ft); Ranked 25th
- Prominence: 3,118 m (10,230 ft); Ranked 77th
- Listing: Ultra
- Coordinates: 36°30′36″N 74°31′21″E

Naming
- Native name: بتورا سر (Urdu)

Geography
- Location within Pakistan Location within Gilgit Baltistan
- The major peaks in Karakoram are rank identified by height. Legend: 1：K2; 2：Gasherbrum I, K5; 3：Broad Peak; 4：Gasherbrum II, K4; 5：Gasherbrum III, K3a; 6：Gasherbrum IV, K3; 7：Distaghil Sar; 8：Kunyang Chhish; 9：Masherbrum, K1; 10：Batura Sar, Batura I; 11：Rakaposhi; 12：Batura II; 13：Kanjut Sar; 14：Saltoro Kangri, K10; 15：Batura III; 16： Saser Kangri I, K22; 17：Chogolisa; 18：Shispare; 19：Trivor Sar; 20：Skyang Kangri; 21：Mamostong Kangri, K35; 22：Saser Kangri II; 23：Saser Kangri III; 24：Pumari Chhish; 25：Passu Sar; 26：Yukshin Gardan Sar; 27：Teram Kangri I; 28：Malubiting; 29：K12; 30：Sia Kangri; 31：Momhil Sar; 32：Skil Brum; 33：Haramosh Peak; 34：Ghent Kangri; 35：Ultar Sar; 36：Rimo Massif; 37：Sherpi Kangri; 38：Yazghil Dome South; 39：Baltoro Kangri; 40：Crown Peak; 41：Baintha Brakk; 42：Yutmaru Sar; 43：K6; 44：Muztagh Tower; 45：Diran; 46：Apsarasas Kangri I; 47：Rimo III; 48：Gasherbrum V; Location in Gilgit-Baltistan
- Location: Gilgit-Baltistan, Pakistan.
- Parent range: Karakoram

Climbing
- First ascent: June 30, 1976 by H Bleicher, H Oberhofer
- Easiest route: rock/snow/ice climb

Batura Sar
- Simplified Chinese: 巴托拉峰
Transcriptions

Batura Sar (Urdu: بتورا سر), also referred to as Batura I, is the 25th-highest mountain on Earth. Located in Passu (Gojal Valley) in the Hunza District of Gilgit-Baltistan region in northern Pakistan, it is the highest peak of the Batura Muztagh, which is the westernmost subrange of the Karakoram range. It forms the apex of the Batura Wall, a continuously high part of the backbone of the Batura Muztagh.

Alternative names of this peak are Batura, Batura I, and Batura I East.

== Location ==
Batura Sar and the Batura Wall lie near the middle of the Batura Muztagh between Shindar shander valley Nagar and Gojal Hunza, which is the only part of the Karakoram which is west of the Hunza-Nagar River. The river curves around the southwest, west, and northwest sides of the Batura Muztagh. The Batura Wall bisects Gojal and Nagar's Bar Valley. In turn, Upper Hunza (Gojal Valley) lies in the Hunza District of the Gilgit-Baltistan.

== Notable features ==
Batura Sar is the 25th highest mountain in the world and the second most prominent peak in the Karakoram range. Since it lies at the northwest end of the Karakoram, there is no higher peak north or west of it in the world.

The Batura Wall is notable for being a long (approximately 11.3 km) and imposing ridge over 7000m. Batura is a very ridge-like peak, rather than a pointed spire.

Although it is just slightly higher (according to the usual figures) than nearby Rakaposhi, it is not nearly as famous, since it is set back much further from the Hunza Valley.

== History ==
Climbing began in the Batura Muztagh later than in other parts of the Karakoram, and despite Batura Sar's height, it has seen little climbing activity.

A climber named Matthias Rebitsch is recorded (by Neate) as having been in the icefall area (this is presumably the Batura First Ice Flow on the north side of the peak) in 1954. The peak was attempted in 1959 by three British and two German climbers, but they all died, probably in an avalanche. Some of the climbers may have gotten near the summit.

The first ascent of the peak was in 1976 by the Göppingen Karakoram-Himalaya Expedition, led by Dr. Alexander Schlee. They placed their base camp on the Baltar Glacier, below the South Face of the peak, on May 21. Hubert Bleicher and Herbert Oberhofer reached the summit on June 30. The first ascent route climbed first from the Eastern Baltar Glacier up and over Batokshi Peak (called "Saddle Peak" by the first expedition) to Batokshi Pass (called the "Batura Saddle"). It then climbed diagonally up and northeast to East Ridge, and thence to the summit. The route used five camps above base camp.

The second ascent of the peak was in 1983 by an Austrian group, who climbed a new route, to the left of the first ascent route.

The Himalayan Index lists an ascent in 1984, but this is contradicted by Neate's book, so the status of this is unclear.

The year 1988 saw the third or fourth ascent of Batura Sar, by another Polish-German expedition, led by Piotr Młotecki. They used the first ascent route; however, they failed in an additional goal of reaching Batura I West.

The Himalayan Index lists five other failed attempts on the peak; these include a winter attempt by an Austrian group in 1981. However, there seems to have been little or no activity on the north side of the mountain since the 1950s.

== Climbing ==
The first ascent route is outlined above. The first ascent party reported ice up to 50 degrees, but they did not record the use of any extensive fixed ropes. They noted the weather and repeated storms as the primary difficulty.

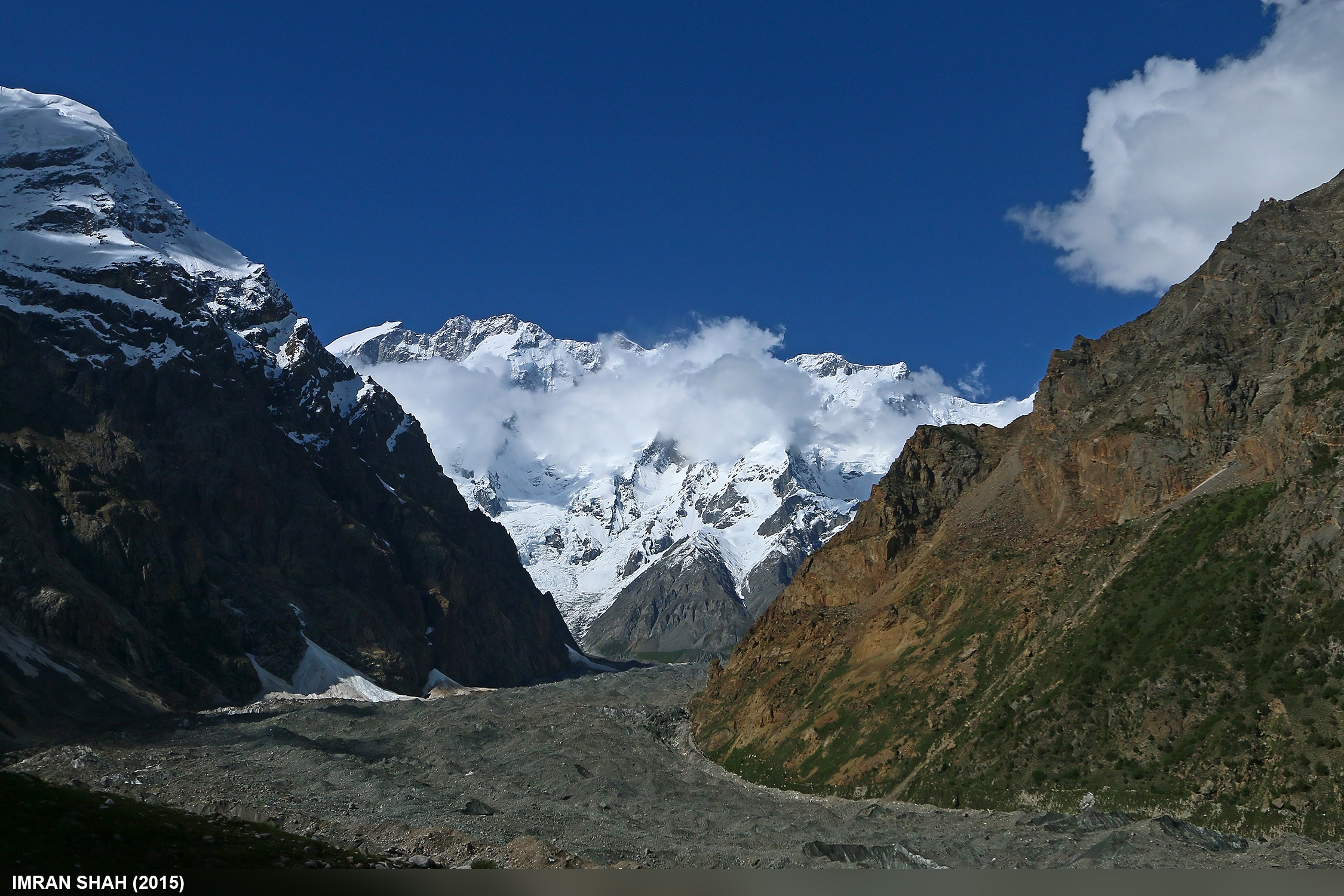
Batura Wall from Gutum Talji, Hunza, Gilgit-Baltistan, Pakistan

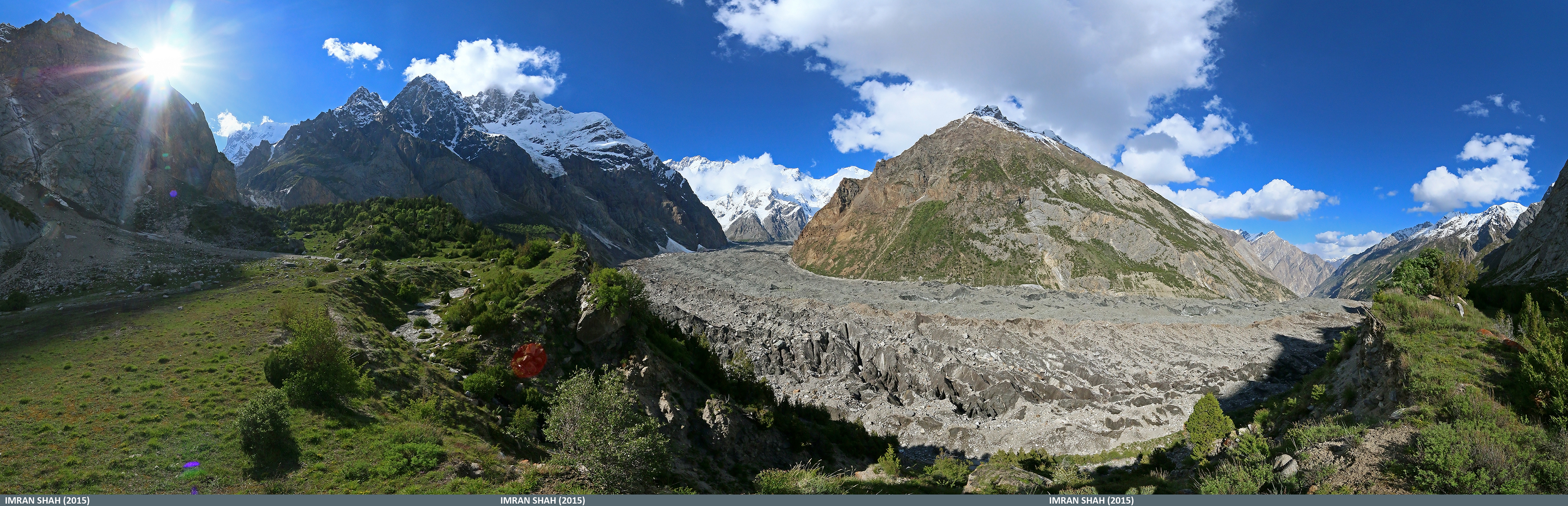
Panorama that includes the snow covered Batura Wall and glaciers from Gutum Talji

== Notes ==
1. This uses a cutoff of 500 m prominence, or re-ascent.

== See also ==
- List of mountains in Pakistan
- List of ultras of the Karakoram and Hindu Kush

== Books/pamphlets/maps about Batura Sar ==
- Neate, Jill (1989). High Asia: An Illustrated History of the 7000 Metre Peaks. Seattle: The Mountaineers. ISBN 0-89886-238-8.
- Batura Mustagh (sketch map and pamphlet) by Jerzy Wala, 1988.
- Orographical Sketch Map of the Karakoram by Jerzy Wala, 1990. Published by the Swiss Foundation for Alpine Research.
- American Alpine Journal 1977, p. 273-274
- American Alpine Journal 1989, p. 262
