= Spantik =

Mountain in Gilgit-Baltistan

- Golden Peak
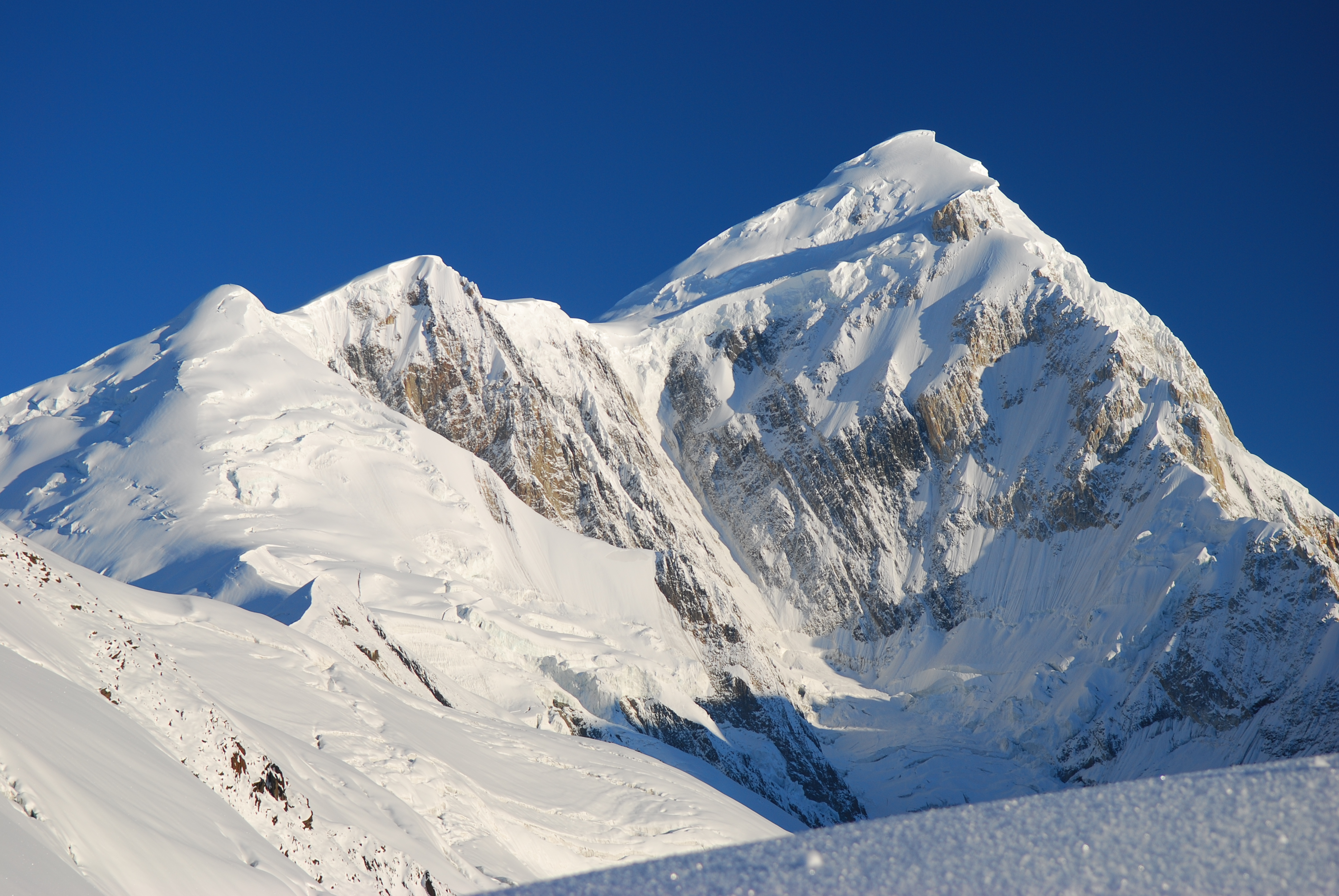
- Spantik south east ridge (left)

Highest point
- Elevation: 7,027 m (23,054 ft)
- Prominence: 1,250 m (4,100 ft)
- Listing: Mountains of Pakistan
- Coordinates: 36°3′26.35″N 74°57′28.74″E

Naming
- Native name: سپانٹک (Balti)

Geography
- Location within Gilgit Baltistan Location within Pakistan
- Country: Pakistan
- Region: Gilgit-Baltistan
- District: Shigar
- Parent range: Spantik-Sosbun Mountains

Spantik, also known as Golden Peak, is a mountain situated in the Spantik-Sosbun subrange within the Karakoram range. It is located in Shigar District, of the Gilgit-Baltistan region of Pakistan. The northwest face of Spantik is dominated by a pronounced pillar of creamy yellow marble which reaches up its north face to 300 m below the summit. Its distinctive appearance has given the peak its Buruskaski name, "Ganesh Chish" or Golden Peak. This outcropping is renowned for its exceptionally challenging climbing route, famously referred to as the "Golden Pillar".

Spantik is positioned to the east of Diran (7,266 m) and northeast of Malubiting (7,458 m). There are various routes leading to the mountain, including paths from the Arandu village in Shigar District, as well as routes originating from the Hopar Valley in Nagar District.

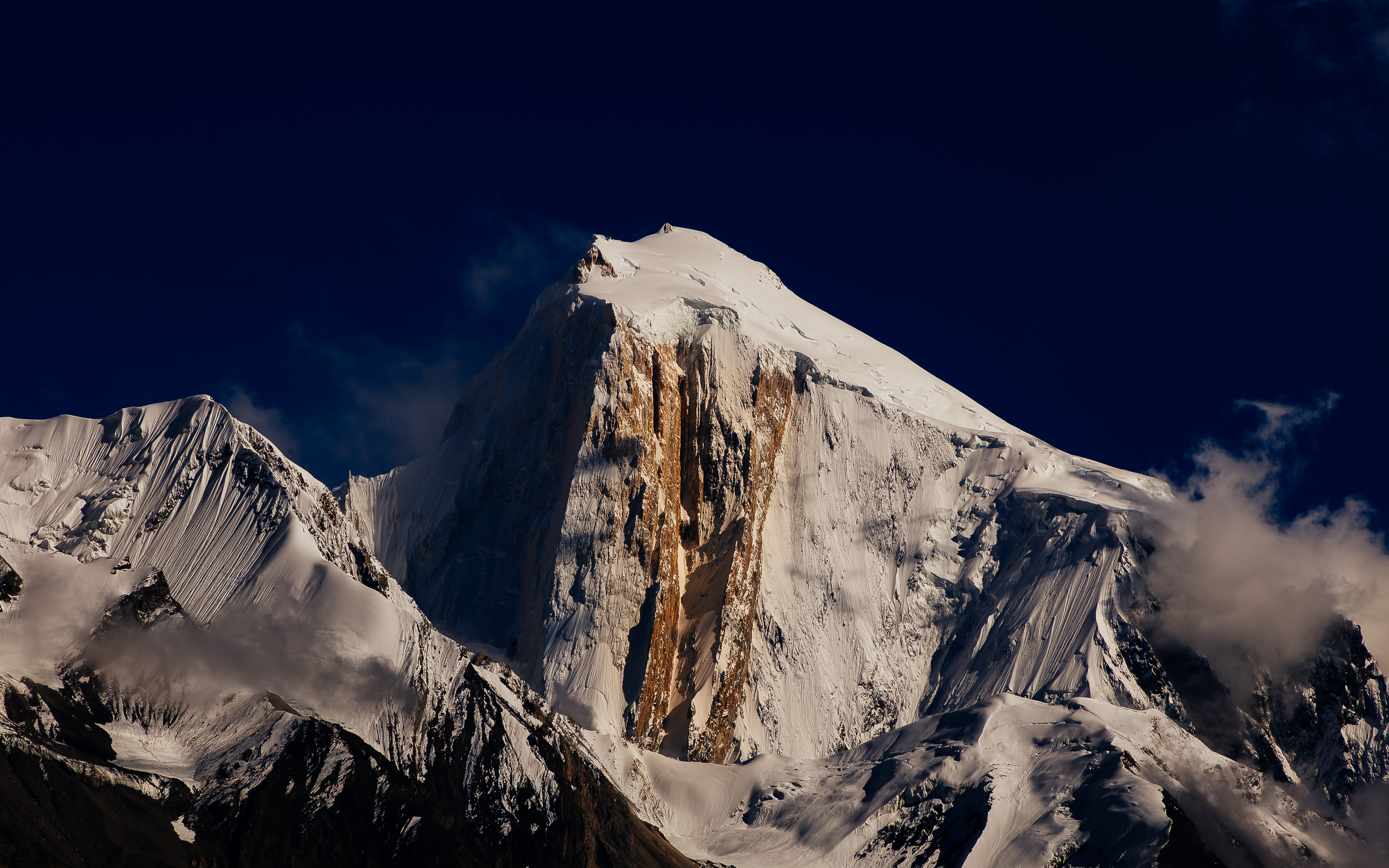
Spantik northwest face

== Climbing history ==
The southeast ridge presents a challenging ascent, spanning 2,700 metres (8,900 ft) over a lateral distance of 7.6 km. The terrain along this ridge is diverse, ranging from rocky outcrops to snow, ice, and scree. The incline along this route generally remains under 30 degrees, with a few sections reaching up to 40 degrees. The most frequently chosen route for climbers follows the southeast ridge, a line that was originally attempted by the Bullock Workman party in 1906.

The mountain has become popular with organised commercial expeditions, due to its relative ease of ascent and scarcity of objective dangers. The short 3-day approach trek across straightforward terrain also provides for easy access and gradual acclimatization.

=== First ascents ===
The first recorded attempt to climb Spantik was in 1906 by the American couple Fanny Bullock Workman and Dr. William Hunter Workman. They reached an altitude 304 metres (997 ft) below the summit. In 1955, Germans Reiner Diepen, Eduard Reinhardt and Jochen Tietze made the first successful ascent of Spantik via the Chogolungma Glacier up the southeast ridge.

In 1978, separate Japanese expeditions made successful summits via the southeast ridge and the unclimbed south ridge.

In 1985, a Dutch expedition made the fourth successful summit of Spantik, and the first ascents by female climbers Antoinette Briët, Sabine Deneer, and Dr. Margreet Hogeweg.

In 1987, Michael George Fowler and Anthony Victor Saunders made the first ascent of Spantik's "Golden Pillar" via its northwest face. The route would not be summited again until 2000.

In 1989, a Swiss-German expedition saw the next successful summits by female climbers, made by Irene Oehringer, Ursula Heynert, Eva Höllinger, Gerhild Kurze, and Monika Weber.

In 2009, a Korean expedition by Kim Hyung-il, Kim Pal-bong, and Min Jun-young made a new route on Spantik's northwest face, climbing in alpine style. The 2,300 m route, Dream 2009 was climbed from July 8 to 14th and graded VI WI4 M8.

=== Pakistani expeditions ===
The first Pakistani expedition to Spantik took place in 1988, consisting of six Pakistan army personnel alongside a German expedition team, The first Pakistani to reach the summit was Captain Muhammad Moiz Uddin Uppal Now Brigadier Muhammad Moiz ud din Uppal.

In July 2011, Spantik was climbed by a team of mountaineers from the Army High Altitude School Rattu. Lt Col Abdul Aziz supervised the team of climbers.

In 2012, Abdul Jabbar Bhatti led the China-Pakistan Friendship Expedition to a successful ascent of Spantik in honor of the 60th anniversary of diplomatic relations between China and Pakistan.

On August 2, 2017, Uzma Yousaf became the first Pakistani woman to climb Spantik as well as any peak above 7,000 meters in Pakistan. The next year, Komal Uzair became the second Pakistani woman to scale Spantik.

On 14 August 2024, Fareed Hussain became the youngest mountaineer to summit Golden Peak. He hails from Rahimabad, a small village in Gilgit.

=== Dual ascent ===
In 1998, French climber Daniel Petraud summited Spantik twice in 16 hours, a new milestone.

=== Youngest ascent ===
On July 17, 2019, Selena Khawaja, a 10-year-old girl from Abbottabad reached the summit, becoming the youngest person to scale Spantik and any peak over 7,000 metres in the world.

=== Ski descent ===
In 2019, Tiphaine Duperier and Boris Langenstein made the first successful ski descent of Spantik.

=== Paragliding ===
On June 8, 2021, French paraglider Antoine Girard landed a paraglider at 6,400 m (21,000 ft) on Spantik's southwest ridge. He climbed to the summit, and flew off the mountain, landing safely in Karimabad an hour later.

== Climbing incidents ==
In 2002, Japanese climber Saito Kenji died on descent from the summit of acute mountain sickness.

In August 2006, German climber Andrea Linckh died near Camp II on her descent from the summit.

In June 2024, Japanese climbers Atsushi Taguchi and Ryuseki Hiraoka went missing during their attempt to summit the peak in alpine style. Hiraoka's body was found 300 m (980 ft) below camp III, two days after going missing. A third Japanese climber, Hiroshi Onishi died less than a month later after falling into a crevasse.

On 20 August 2026, Pakistani mountaineer Asma Mushtaq successfully reached the summit of Spantik (7,027 m) accompanied by mountain guide Akbar Ali. During her descent, at an altitude of approximately 6,400 meters, Mushtaq suffered a severe medical emergency related to high-altitude sickness and died despite immediate rescue and assistance efforts by the mountain guides.

== See also ==
- Nagar Valley

== Bibliography ==
- Dave Hancock - Climbing Spantik, The FTA trip Files (Perth, WA 2004)
