= Machulo La =

Pakistani mountain pass

Coordinates: 35°16′25″N 76°19′08″E

Machulo La (has also been spelled Machulu) is a mountain pass at an altitude of about 5,000 metres (16,000 ft), located in Central Karakoram National Park, Gilgit-Baltistan, Pakistan.

It offers stunning views of some of the highest peaks in the Himalayas and Karakoram ranges. From this point one can see K2, Broad Peak, Gasherbrum-I, Gasherbrum-II, Gasherbrum III, Gasherbrum IV, K7, K6 and Nanga Parbat. It is also possible to have a wider view point including Masherbrum (K1) by moving along the ridgeline to the southeast.

== See also ==
- Burji La
