= Eduard Koblmueller =

Eduard "Edi" Koblmueller (German: Koblmüller) (10 April 1946 – 16 April 2015) was an Austrian mountaineer.

== Life ==
Koblmueller was born in Linz, Austria. He studied at the University of Natural Resources and Life Sciences, Vienna with a degree in forestry.

In 1978 he founded with his wife Elisabeth a mountaineering school called Bergspechte and for that gave up his secure position with the government of Upper Austria (he worked in the department of agriculture and forestry and was responsible for environmental matters, at a time when no department for these existed.)

In 1991 he was caught by an avalanche in the Pyrenees and rescued by his team, but suffered knee injuries with long-term consequences. In 2005 he was completely buried by an avalanche in Abruzzo, but located and excavated by friends. In this incident, he suffered no injuries.

In 1999, Koblmueller's older son Michael died at the age of 24 during an ascent of the Diran (7,266-meter/23,839 ft) in an avalanche. In 2003, his wife died at age 56 during an exercise in an indoor climbing wall. Both Koblmueller and his wife were licensed mountain guides, as is their younger son Reinhard.

Since 1968, Koblmueller participated in expeditions in the Andes, in the Hindu Kush, in the Karakoram and the Himalayas, and achieved important first ascents. His most important accomplishment was the first ascent of the Southeast Face of Cho Oyu (8201 m/26,906 ft) in 1978 together with Alois Furtner [3]. Koblmueller was considered one of the most successful Austrian expedition mountaineer, and reached five eight-thousanders.

In the summer of 2014, he sold his shares of the Bergspechte company to a German firm operating in the same field, but remained active as an adviser.

On 10 April 2015 Koblmueller led a group of nine participants in a ski expedition to Mount Kazbek (5047 m/16,516 ft) in the Greater Caucasus. During one leg of the ascent the group encountered a snow storm. Seven members of the mostly Austrian group managed to reach a hut and were unharmed. Koblmueller and an Austrian participant attempted to reach the summit as the last of the group. Both were caught in a blizzard, and were found dead on the afternoon of 16 April 2015 at an altitude of 4700 m. Their bodies were retrieved by helicopter.

== Mountaineering achievements (selected) ==
- K6 (7281 m/23,891 ft) 1970, First ascent with Gerhard Haberl, Christian von der Hecken and Gerd Pressl
- Chogolisa (7668 m/25,157 ft), 1975. First ascent of Chogolisa I.
- Cho Oyu (8201 m/26,901 ft): 1978, First ascent of Southeast Face in alpine style
- Nanga Parbat (8125 m/26,660 ft): 1983, Rupal Face with one partner
- Batura Sar (7785 m/25,574 ft), Karakoram: 1983, First ascent of South Face
- Diran (7266 m/23,893 ft), Karakoram: 1985, First ascent of North Pillar
- Rakaposhi (7010 m/25,551 ft), Karakoram: 1985, First ascent of North Pillar
- K2 (8611 m/28,251 ft): 1989, Attempt of a new route in the East Face, up to 7200 m/23,600 ft
- Dhaulagiri (8167 m/26,795 ft): 1996, Reached summit together with son Michael Koblmüller
- Muztagh Ata (7546 m/24,636 ft): 1997, Ski ascent
- Shishapangma (8013 m/26,335 ft): 1998
- Broad Peak (8047 m/26,414): 1999, Reached summit with son Reinhard Koblmüller
- Pik Lenin (7134 m/23,406 ft), Pamir, Kyrgyzstan: 2002
