= Panmah Muztagh =

Mountain range in the Karakoram

- 潘玛慕士塔格山
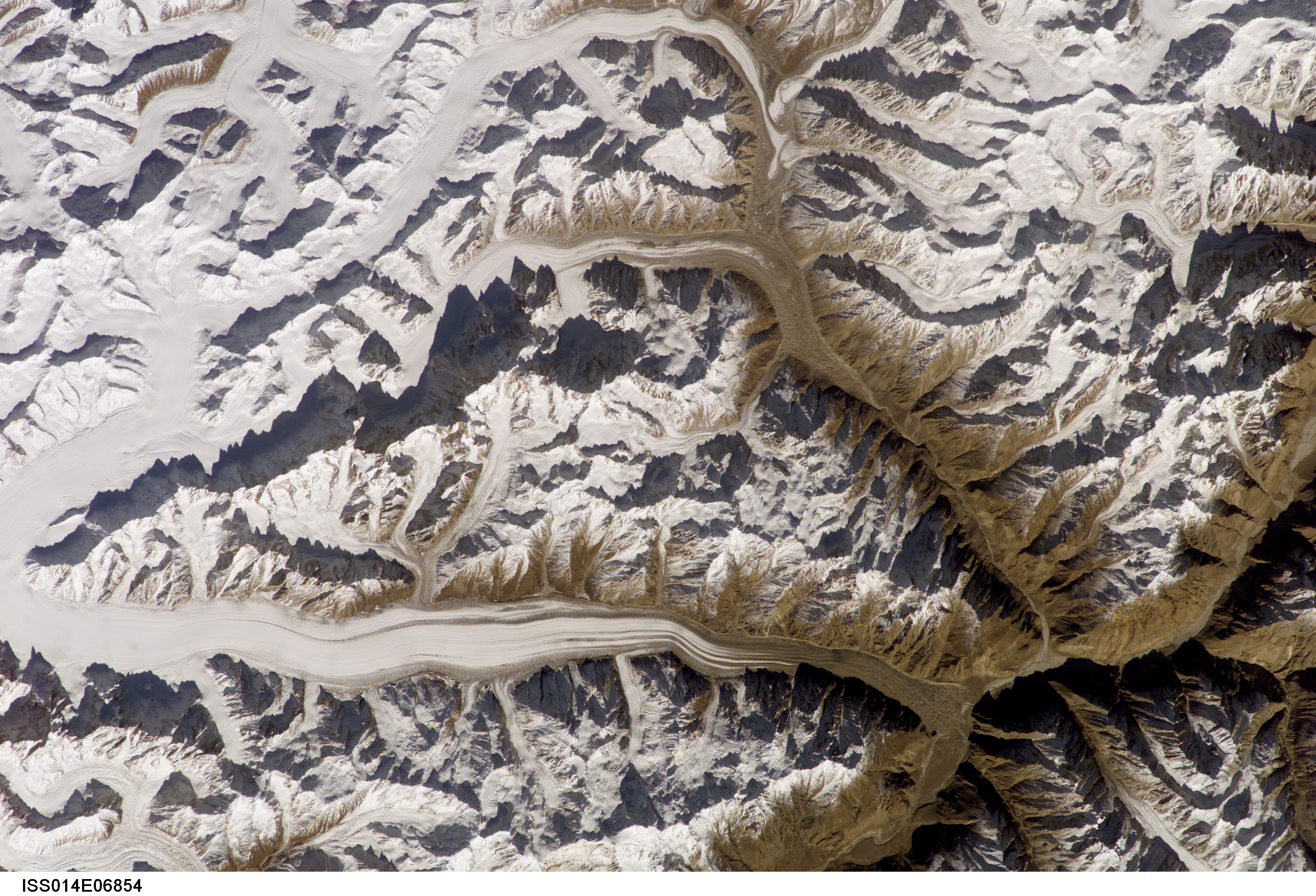
- Panmah Muztagh above the Biafo Glacier: Latok Group (centre-left) and Baintha Brakk (The Ogre)(very left)

Highest point
- Peak: Baintha Brakk
- Elevation: 7,285 metres (23,901 ft)
- Coordinates: 35°57′N 75°45′E

Geography
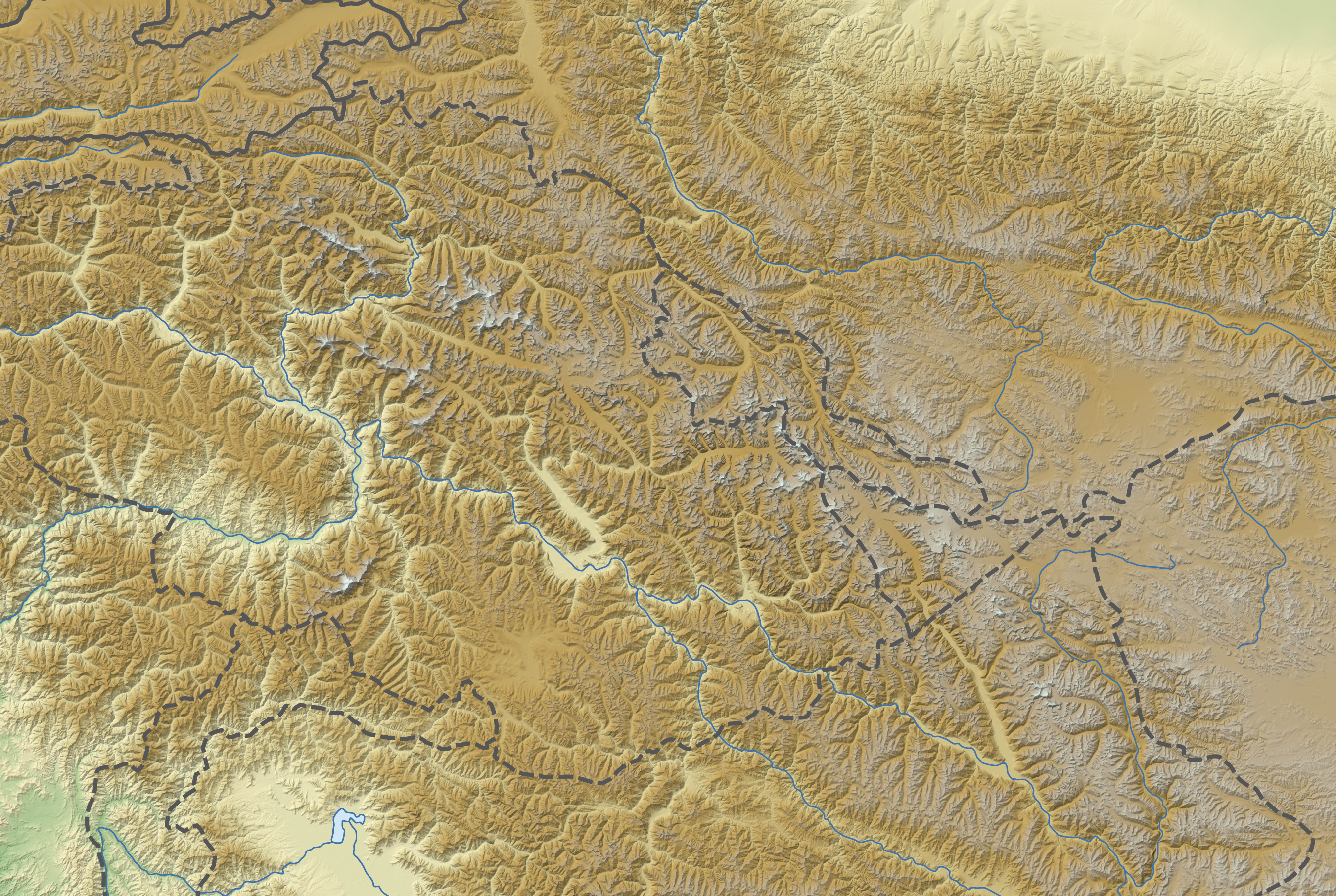
- Location within Karakoram Location within Gilgit Baltistan
- Country: Pakistan
- Regions: Gilgit-Baltistan
- Parent range: Karakoram

The Panmah Muztagh is a subrange of the Karakoram range, in Shigar, a district of Gilgit-Baltistan, Pakistan.

== Geography ==
Panmah Muztagh's highest peaks are not particularly high by Karakoram standards, but they are exceedingly steep rock spires, unlike many of the peaks in the surrounding subranges. In particular, the highest of the Panmah peaks, Baintha Brakk (The Ogre) (7,285 m/23,901 feet), is a very difficult climb; it has seen only three ascents. The nearby Latok group is of similar difficulty. Both groups lie on the north side of the long Biafo Glacier.

The Panmah Muztagh lies in the heart of the Karakoram, northwest of the Baltoro Muztagh (home of the eight thousand meter peaks of the Karakoram), and southeast of the Hispar Muztagh. On the southwest, it is separated from the Spantik-Sosbun Mountains by the Biafo Glacier. The Skamri Glacier and the Braldu Glacier separate it from the Wesm Mountains to the north. The Panmah, Nobande Sobande, Choktoi, and Chiring Glaciers lie within the range.

== Notable peaks of the Panmah Muztagh ==
Mountain	Height (m)	Height (ft)	Coordinates	Prominence (m)	Parent mountain	First ascent	Ascents (attempts)
Baintha Brakk	7,285	23,901	35°56′51″N 75°45′12″E	1,891	Distaghil Sar	1977	3 (14)
Latok I (Latok Central)	7,151	23,461	35°55′41″N 75°49′21″E	1,475	Baintha Brakk	1979	2
Latok II (Latok West)	7,108	23,320	35°55′12″N 75°48′09″E	400	Latok I	1977	7
Latok III (Latok East)	6,949	22,798	35°55′12″N 75°50′23″E	650	Latok I	1979	5
