= Link Sar =

Mountain in Karakoram

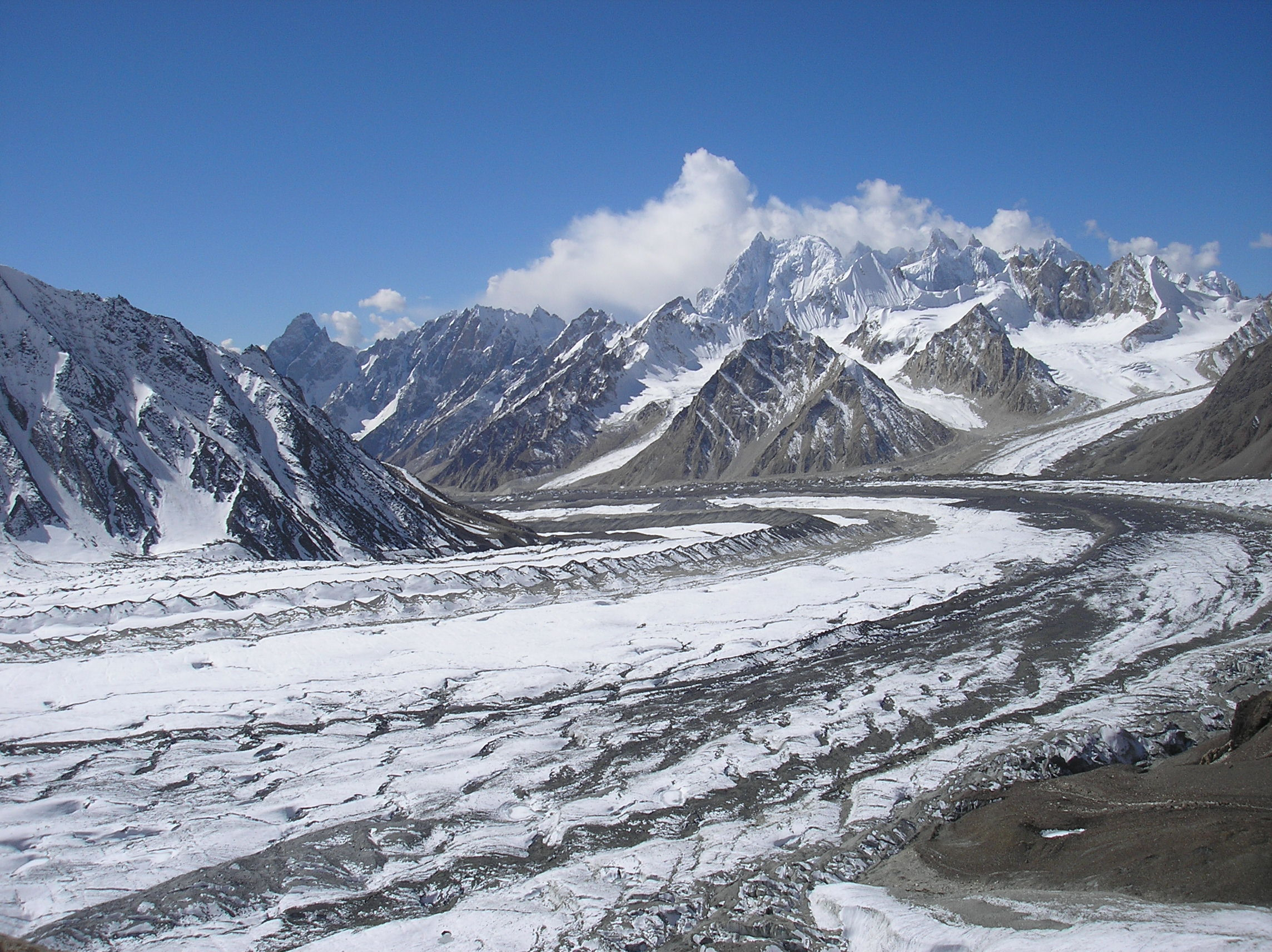
- View of Link Sar (right of centre), K6 and K7 behind.

Highest point
- Elevation: 7,041 m (23,100 ft)
- Prominence: 1,021 m (3,350 ft)
- Coordinates: 35°27′04″N 76°35′39″E

Geography
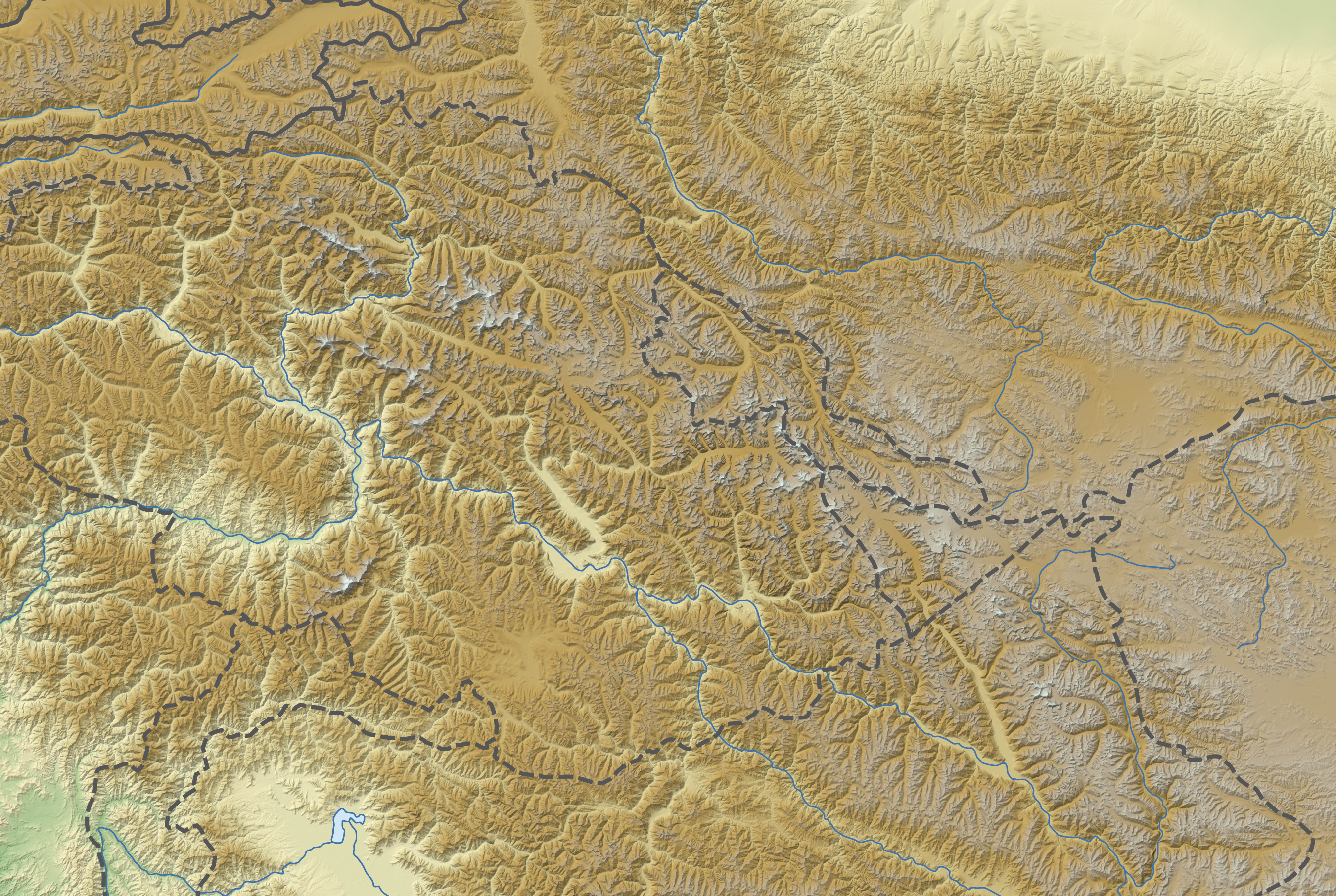
- Location within Gilgit Baltistan Location within Karakoram Location within Ladakh
- Location: Gilgit-Baltistan
- Parent range: Karakoram, Masherbrum Range

Climbing
- First ascent: 6 Aug 2019 by Graham Zimmerman, Steve Swenson, Chris Wright and Mark Richey.

Link Sar is a mountain located in the Masherbrum sub-range of the Karakoram between the head of the Charakusa Glacier and the Kaberi Glacier. The peak lies on a horseshoe which links K6 and K7 around the head of the Charakusa Glacier.

== Climbing history ==
Isolated, steep and protected by significant snow and ice, Link Sar remained one of the world's highest unclimbed peaks until 2019.

First attempts of ascent were made by Japanese teams in the mid-1970s. After that period, very few permits to access the mountain from the east were available due to the proximity to the contested border between Pakistan and India. Steve Swenson was granted a permit with others in 2001 and his team made some limited progress from this side of the mountain. Over the next decade, all attempts to obtain permits for a return were denied.

Jon Griffith made attempts on the western side of the mountain from 2011 with different climbing partners, scaling the Northwest Face in 2015 with Andy Houseman to reach the subsidiary peak of Link Sar West (6,938m). Illness and a narrowing weather window led to a decision not to push further to the main summit a kilometre away.

Swenson was eventually able to return to the eastern side in 2017, with Graham Zimmerman and Chris Wright. In atrocious weather they only reached a height of 5,900m on the Southwest Face but the experience enabled them to identify a possible future safe route to the summit.

On 6 August 2019, the summit was finally conquered by Steve Swenson, Mark Richey, Graham Zimmerman, and Chris Wright via the mountain's Southeast Face.
