= Drifika =

Mountain peak in Karakoram range, Pakistan

- Defrekal (13 November 2014)

Highest point
- Elevation: 6,447 m (21,152 ft)
- Coordinates: 35°25′31″N 76°27′26″E

Geography
- Location within Pakistan Location within Gilgit Baltistan
- Location: Karakoram

Climbing
- First ascent: 1978 by Japanese team

Drifika (also known as Drefekal) is a mountain peak in the Karakoram range, far west of the Transhimalaya.

== Location ==
The peak is located at 6,447 m (21,152 ft) above sea level near the Charakusa glacier in Gilgit-Baltistan region. It is considered part of the Masherbrum Mountains.

Both the north route, through the Kharidas valley, and the south route, through the Nangma valley, are viable routes to the summit. The south route is the most popular for climbing due to its easy accessibility from base camp.

== Climbing history ==
In 1978, a group of Japanese climbers led by Akiya Ishimura were the first group of mountaineers to reach the summit.

In May 2023, Italian climber Giovanni Zaccaria made a first ascent of the south face and southwest spur of Drifika, descending on skis. The one day climb and descent was nominated as one of the most notable climbs of 2023 by members of the Piolets d'Or technical committee.
