= Sosbun Brakk =

Mountain peak in Karakoram range, Pakistan

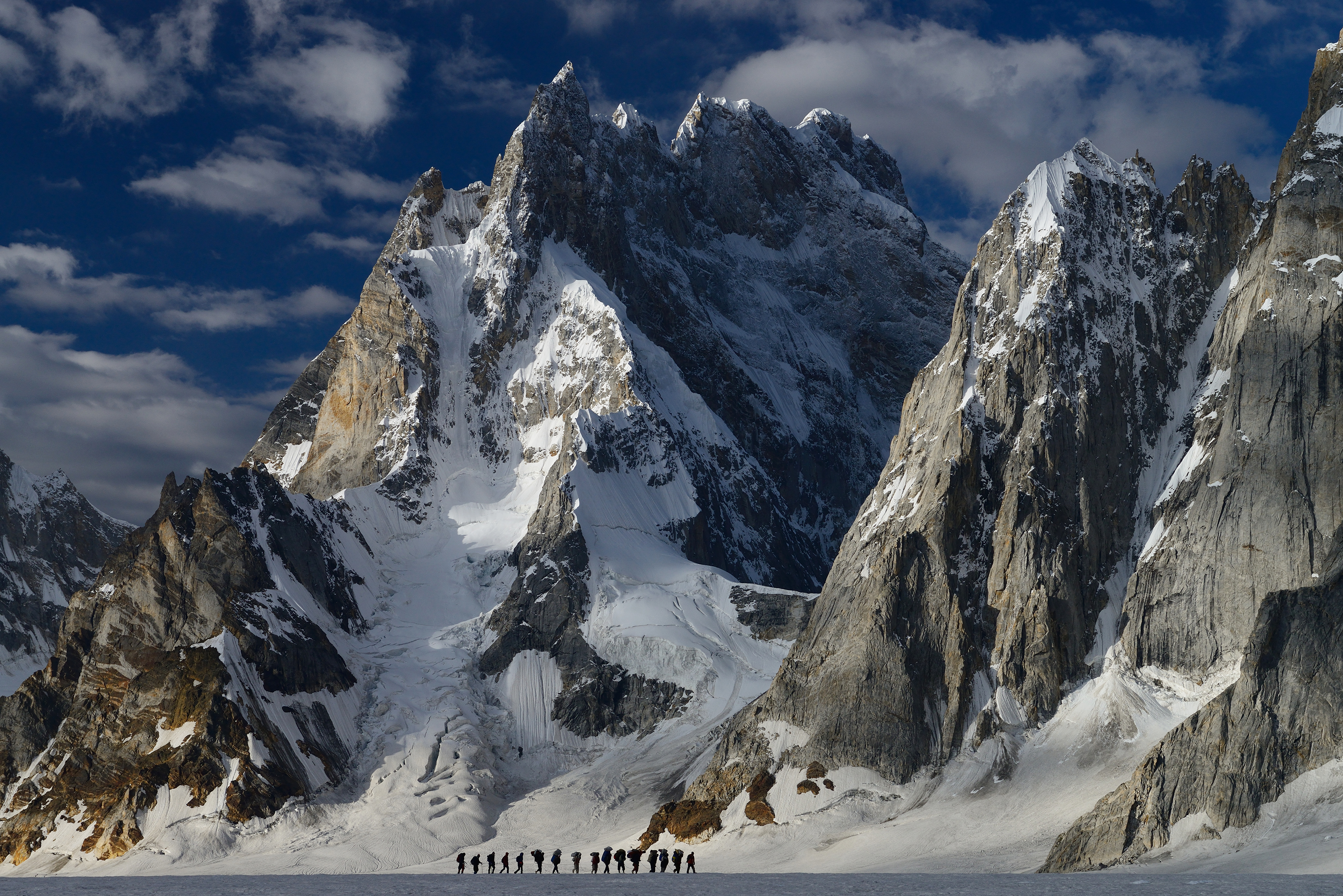
- An expedition of trekkers was moving towards Snow Lake when this image was captured. The mountain behind is Sosbun Brakk, 6413 meters high. (26 August 2013)

Highest point
- Elevation: 6,413 m (21,040 ft)
- Coordinates: 35°56′01″N 75°33′13″E

Geography
- Location within Pakistan Location within Gilgit Baltistan
- Location: Karakoram

Climbing
- First ascent: 1982 by Japanese team

Sosbun Brakk is one of the mountain peaks of the Spantik-Sosbun Mountains, part of a subrange of the Karakoram range in Gilgit-Baltistan, Pakistan.

== Location ==
The peak is located at 6,413 m (21,040 ft) above sea level.

== Climbing history ==
In 1976, a German expedition team tried to reach the summit but failed. Finally, on 4 July 1982, a Japanese team led by Seiichi Kawauchi of the Japanese Alpine Club successfully climbed the mountain. Hisao Hashimoto, Mikio Tabata, and Norichika Matsumoto were the other people on the Japanese team.
