= Burji La =

Mountain pass in Baltistan, Pakistan

Coordinates: 35°12′N 75°32′E

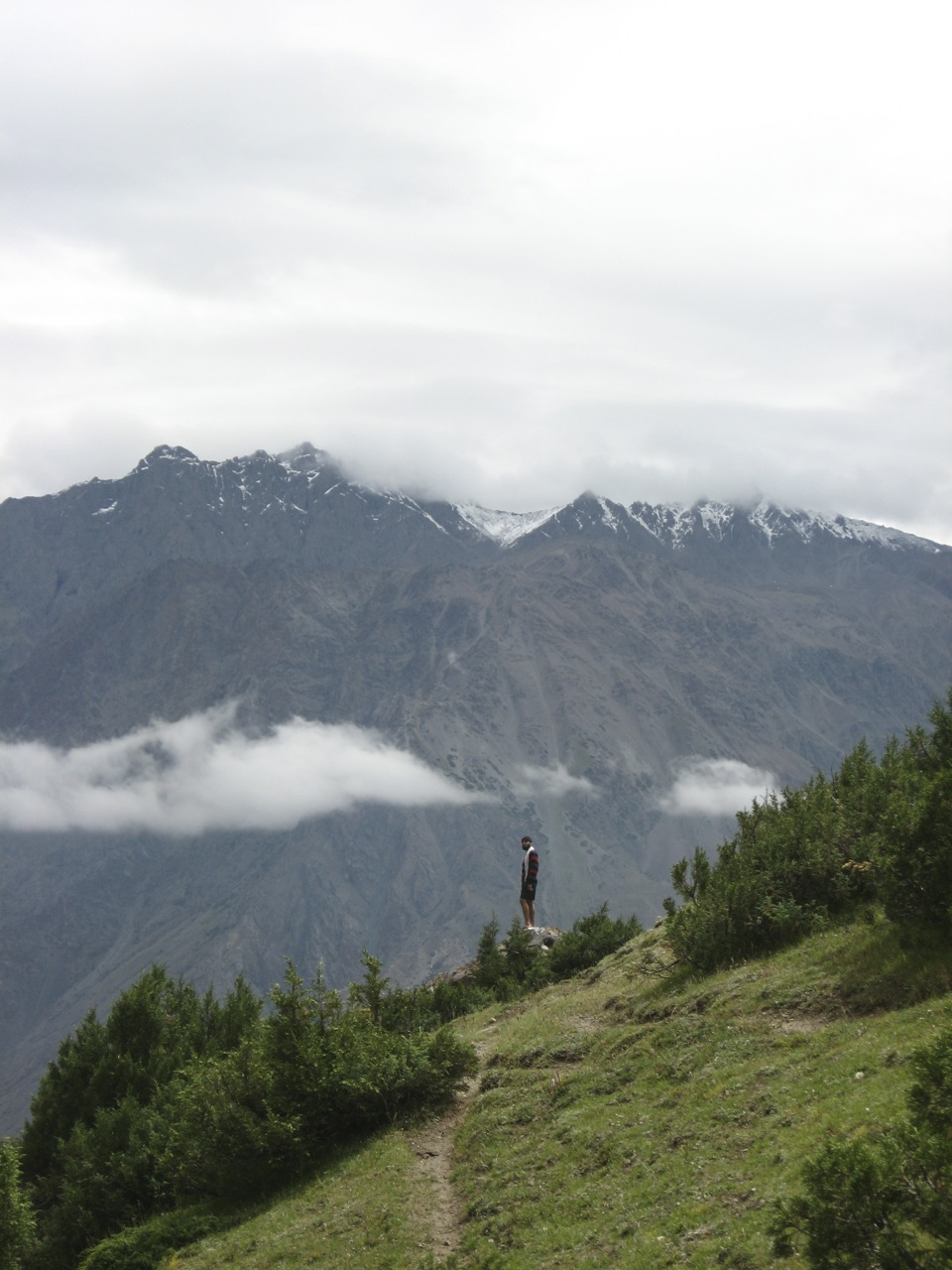
A vista near Burji La in Pakistan

Burji La (Balti: བུརཇི་ལ།, romanized: buraji la, lit. 'Burji pass') is a natural pass in the Karakoram mountains between Skardu and Deosai National Park in Gilgit Baltistan, Pakistan. Its elevation is 5000 meters. It is famous, especially for its beautiful panoramic view of many mountain peaks, including that of K2, Nanga Parbat, Masherbrum, Chogolisa, Laila Peak, Golden Peak, Gasherbrum I, Gasherbrum II, Gasherbrum IV and a part of Broad Peak mountain.

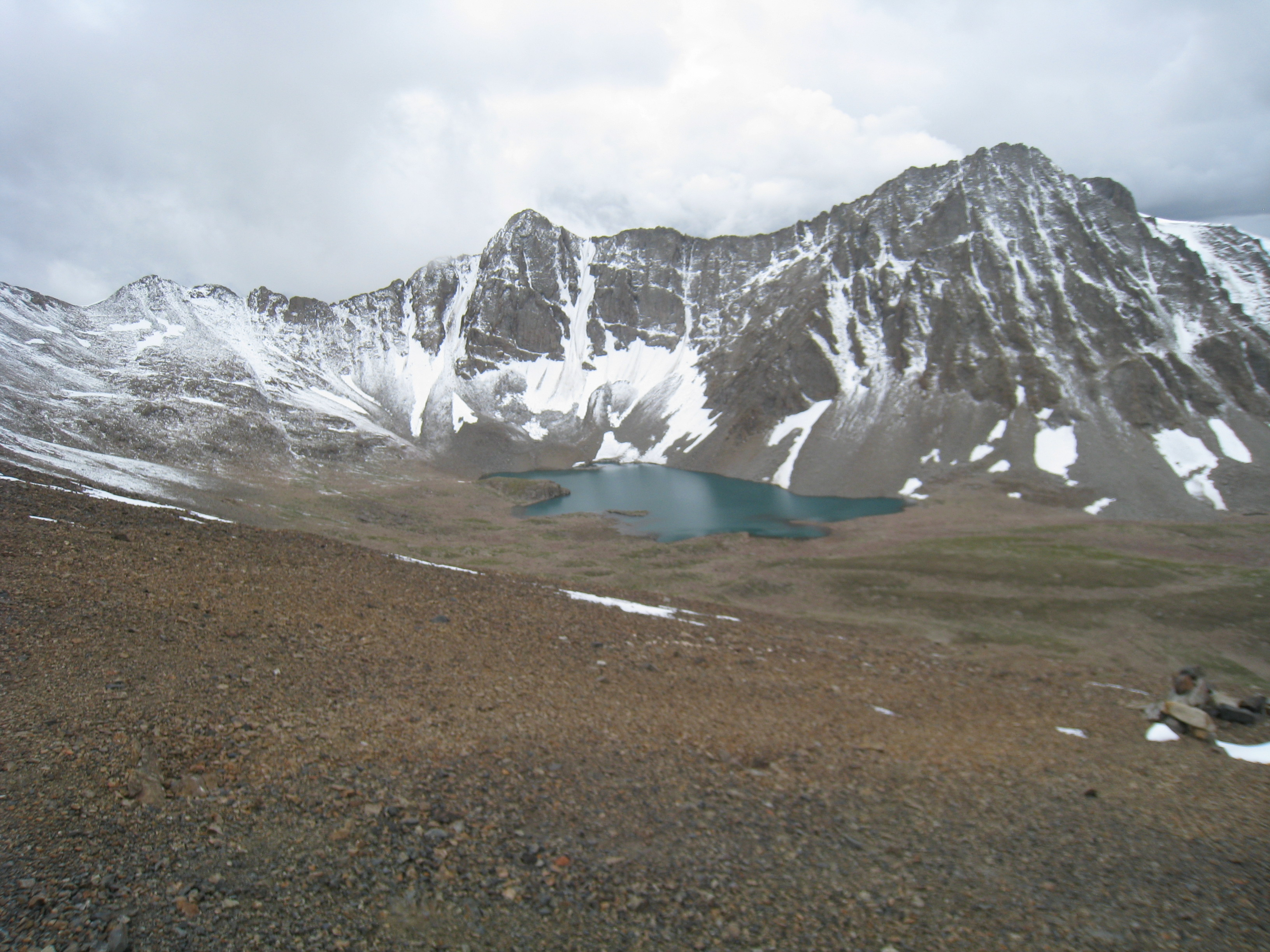
An unnamed lake located below Burji La

== See also ==
- Machulo La
