= Army High Altitude School =

Pakistan Army training formation for mountain warfare

Coordinates: 35.142548273277°N 74.79311181037332°E

Pakistan Army High Altitude School
- Badge of Pakistan Army
- Active: 1987; 39 years ago
- Country: Pakistan
- Branch: Pakistan Army
- Type: Training formation
- Garrison/HQ: Rattu Cantt, Gilgit-Baltistan in Pakistan.
- Nickname: AHAS

The Pakistan Army High Altitude School (reporting name: AHAS) is a military training school that provides special skills training to its soldiers in the mountain and cold-weather environment.

It is located in Rattu Cantonment in Gilgit-Baltistan, Pakistan.

== Overview and training ==
The Pakistan Army's Corps of Education organized the training formation to provide teaching and instructions on trekking, mountaineering, skiing, and survival techniques in 1987. Training is delivered in the form of lectures, demonstrations, practices and physical fitness and training. In order to ensure realistic training, different exercises are conducted form high altitude of 12,000 to 16,000 feet (3,700 to 4,900 m) at the surface of most famous peaks— the Nanga Parbat and Rakaposhi mountain ranges.

Students are taught how to acclimatise, climb safely and move safely in the mountainous areas. The focus is on soldiers being able to carry out their daily tasks while surviving on barely sufficient oxygen.

Although, the school is managed and operated by the Pakistan Army's administration, the Navy SEALs groups from the Pakistan Navy, special forces personnel from the Pakistan Marines, and even the 5th Special Forces Group of the United States Army Special Forces and the Russian special operations forces have trained and earned their certification pins.

The AHAS school training faculty consist of only army officers, warrant officers, and enlisted personnel.

Additionally the school supports the training of civilian volunteer rescuers in disaster response.
