= Abdul Jabbar Bhatti =

Pakistani retired military officer

Personal information
- Native name: عبدالجبار بھٹی
- Nationality: Pakistani
- Born: 9 October 1957 (age 69) Gujranwala, Pakistan
- Occupations: Physician, Mountaineer
Mountaineering Career
- Major Ascents: Broad Peak in 1985; Gasherbrum II in 1986; Spantik in 2012; Mount Everest in 2017

Sport
- Military Career
- Military career
- Allegiance: Pakistan
- Branch: Pakistan Army
- Rank: Lt. Colonel
- Units: Special Services Group; Pakistan Army Medical Corps
- Awards: President's Award for Pride of Performance; Tamgha-i-Basalat; Sitara-i-Imtiaz

Abdul Jabbar Bhatti is a Pakistani mountaineer and paraglider. He served in the Pakistani Army until he retired as lieutenant colonel. In 1985, he climbed Broad Peak, in 1986 Gasherbrum II, and later in 2012, he climbed Spantik. In 2017, he became the fourth Pakistani citizen, oldest Pakistani climber, and the first mountaineer from Punjab to climb the Mount Everest.

He is first Pakistani to learn paragliding from France in 1988 and introduce in Pakistan with the help of Pakistan army.

He got Mountaineering training in Pakistan through ACP in 1981 and later he went to France where he received mountaineering training from the National School of Mountaineering (ENSA) in 1983. The recipient of military and civil awards, including the Pride of Performance, He has also climbed Mt. Kilimanjaro and Mt. Aconcagua.

In December 2020 (22 to 29), he completed an ultra run of 500 km, starting from Khunjerab Pass (4,693M) over snow and on October 1, 2021, completed the highest run over Deosai Plains for 65 km, starting at 5,370 M and finishing at 4,170 M.

In 2019, he climbed Mount Aconcagua, the highest peak in South America.

== Awards and accolades ==
Year	Award	Category	Ref.
—N/a	Pride of Performance	Sports	
—N/a	Tamgha-i-Basalat	Military	
2018	Sitara-i-Imtiaz	Sports	
