= Paiju Peak =

Mountain in Pakistan

- Payu
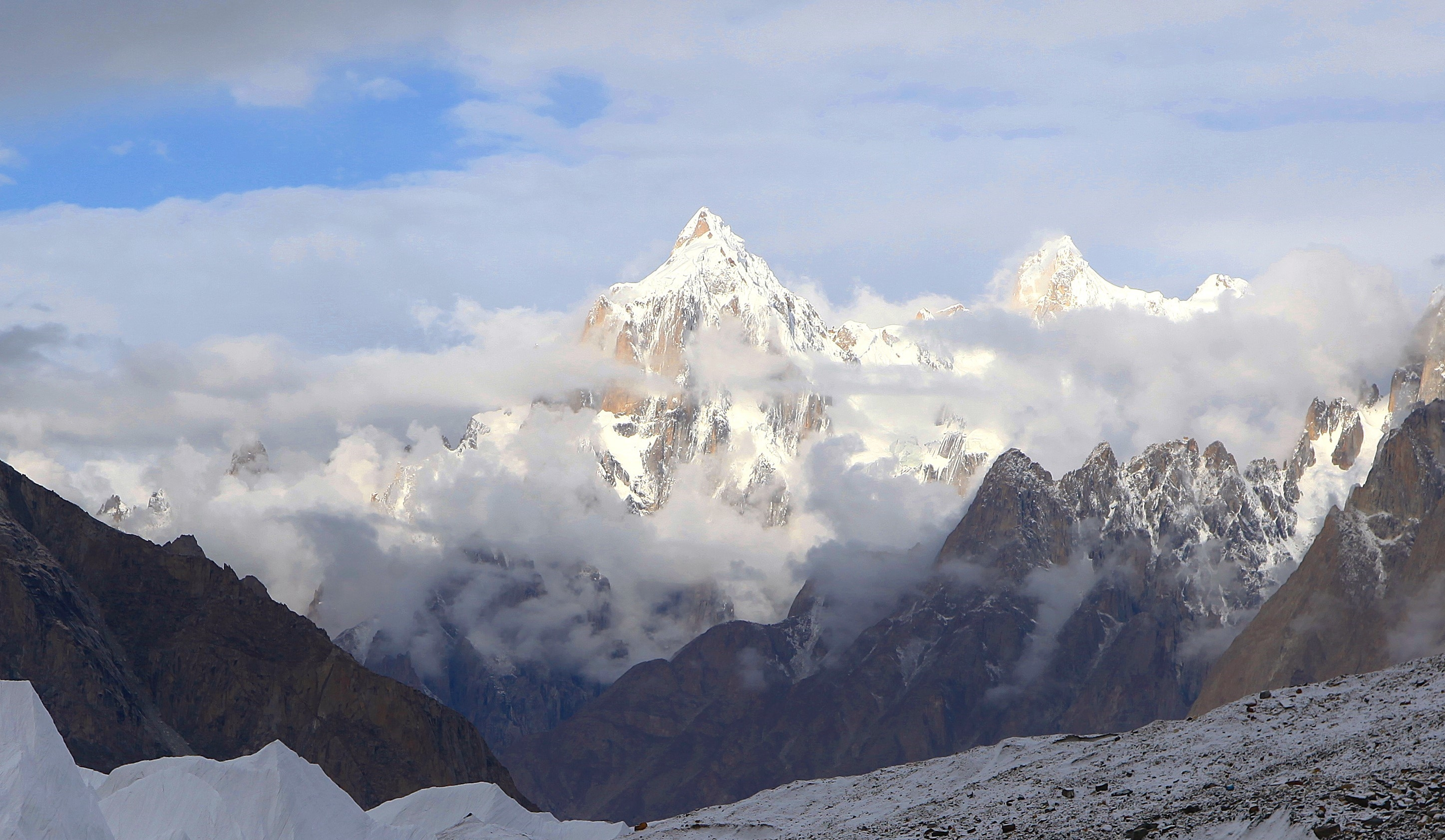
- East aspect

Highest point
- Elevation: 6,610 m (21,686 ft)
- Prominence: 582 m (1,909 ft)
- Parent peak: Choricho
- Isolation: 2.97 km (1.85 mi)
- Coordinates: 35°42′57″N 76°06′59″E

Geography
- Location within Karakoram Location within Gilgit Baltistan Location within Pakistan
- Interactive map of Paiju Peak
- Location: Kashmir
- Country: Pakistan
- Administrative territory: Gilgit-Baltistan
- District: Shigar
- Protected area: Central Karakoram National Park
- Parent range: Karakoram; Baltoro Muztagh

Geology
- Rock type: Granite

Climbing
- First ascent: 1976

Paiju Peak, also known as Payu, is a mountain in northern Pakistan.

== Description ==
Paiju Peak is a 6,610-metre (21,686-foot) glaciated summit in the Baltoro Muztagh subrange of the Karakoram. The remote mountain is situated three kilometres (1.9 mi) immediately northwest of the terminus of the Baltoro Glacier and nine kilometres (5.6 mi) southwest of the Trango Towers in Central Karakoram National Park. Precipitation runoff from this mountain's slopes drains into the Braldu River drainage basin. Topographic relief is significant as the summit rises 3,200 metres (10,500 ft) above the Braldu River Valley in three kilometres (1.9 mi).

The first recorded ascent of the summit was achieved on July 20, 1976, by Raja Bashir Ahmad, Manzoor Hussain, and Nazir Sabir who were members of an Alpine Club of Pakistan expedition. Technical assistance was provided by Allen Steck who stopped short of the summit to photograph the other climbers.

== Climate ==
Based on the Köppen climate classification, Paiju Peak is located in a tundra climate zone with cold, snowy winters, and cool summers. Weather systems are forced upwards by the mountains (orographic lift), causing heavy precipitation in the form of rainfall and snowfall. October through November is the monsoon season. The months of June, July, and August offer the most favorable weather for visiting or climbing this peak.

== See also ==
- List of mountains in Pakistan

== Gallery ==
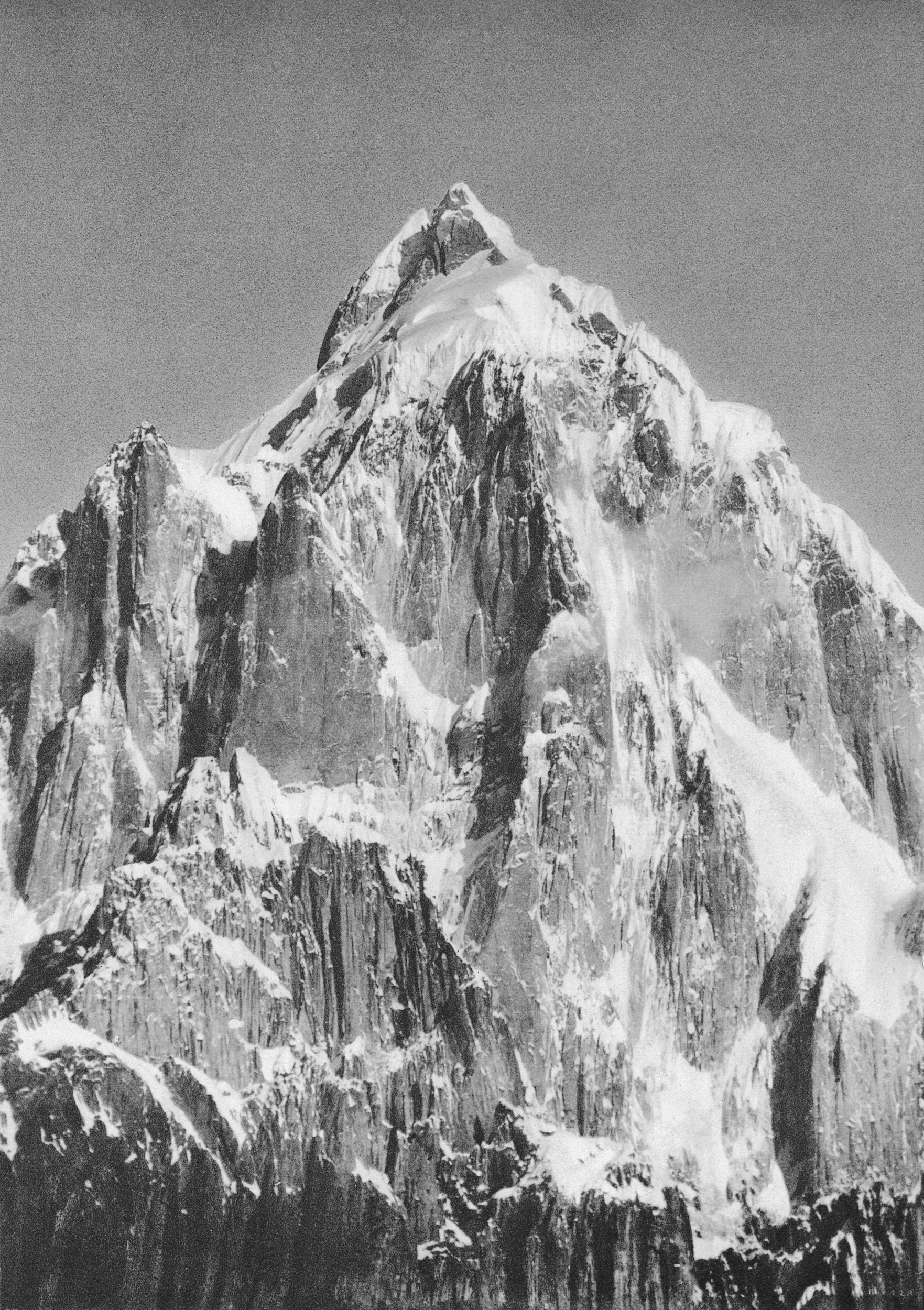
East face

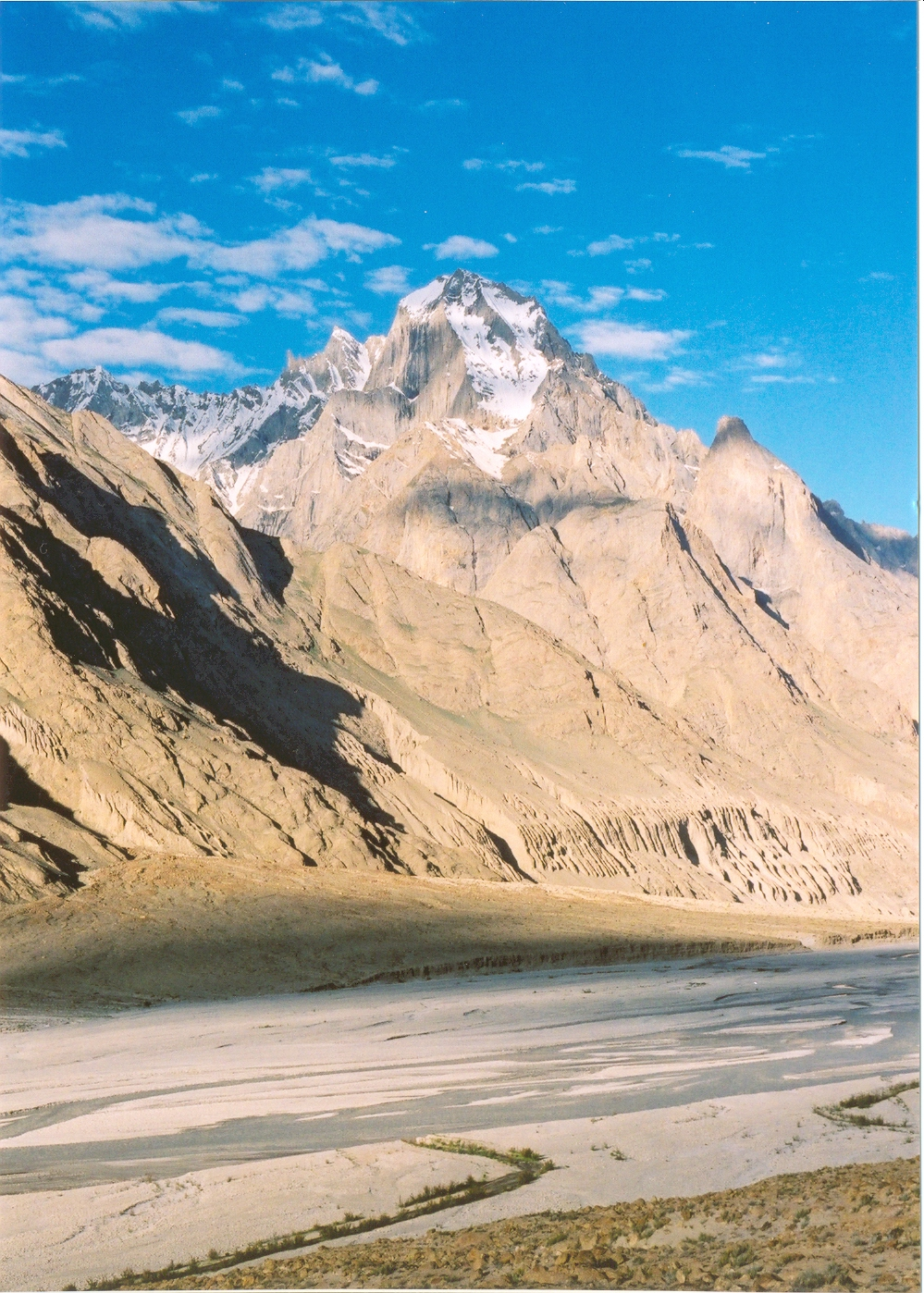
Southwest aspect

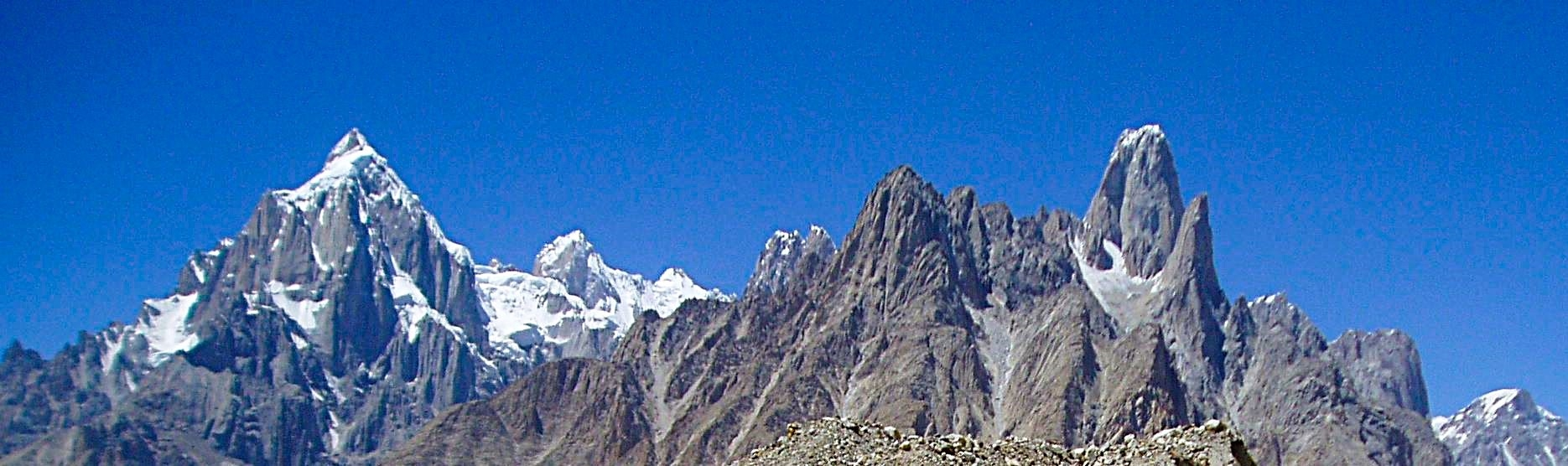
Paiju Peak (left), and Uli Biaho Tower (right) from east
