= Spantik-Sosbun Mountains =

Sub-range of the Karakoram in Pakistan

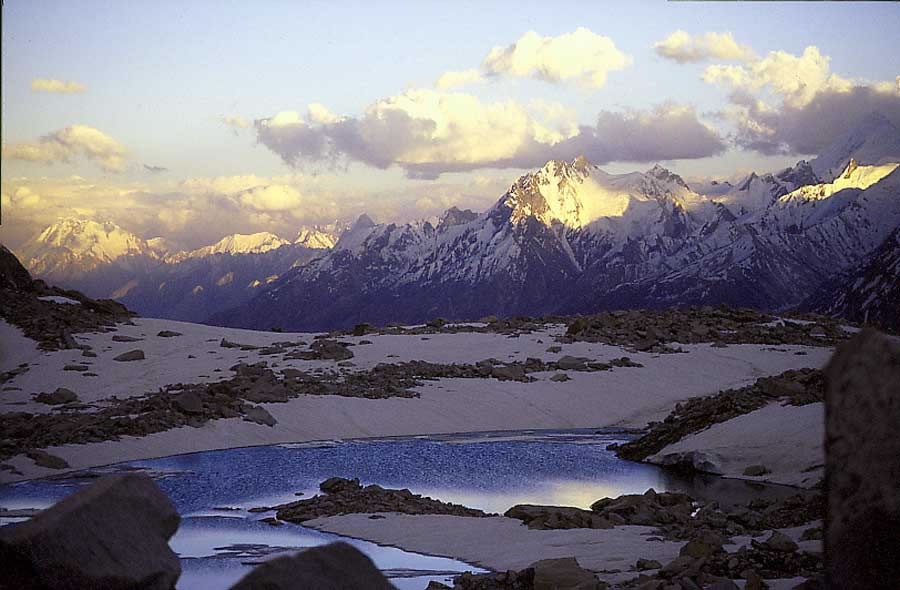
- Eastern parts of the range, Biafo valley on the left

Highest point
- Peak: Spantik
- Elevation: 7,027 metres (23,054 ft)
- Coordinates: 36°03′N 74°57′E

Geography
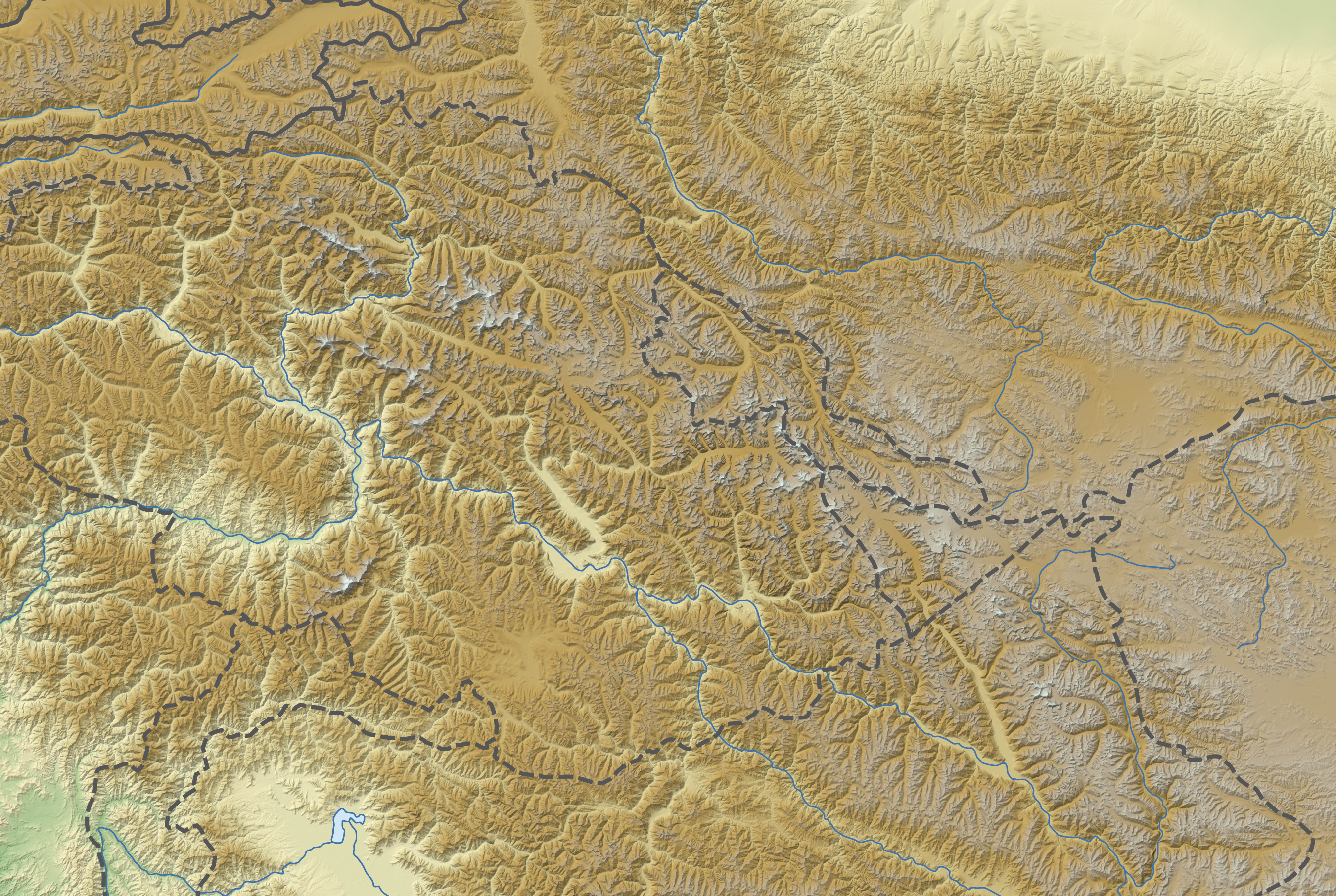
- Location within Karakoram Location within Gilgit Baltistan
- Country: Pakistan
- Regions: Gilgit-Baltistan
- Parent range: Karakoram

The Spantik-Sosbun Mountains are a sub-range of the Karakoram range in Gilgit-Baltistan, Pakistan.

== Geography ==
The highest peak is Spantik, 7,027 metres (23,054 ft). The other namesake peak is Sosbun Brakk, 6,413 metres (21,040 ft).

The Spantik-Sosbun Mountains are a narrow range, about 120 kilometres (75 mi) long, trending roughly east–west. On the north, the range is bounded by the important Hispar and Biafo Glaciers, across which lie the Hispar Muztagh and Panmah Muztagh respectively. On the southwest, the Barpu Glacier and the longer Chogo Lungma Glacier separate the range from the Rakaposhi-Haramosh Mountains; the pass known as the Polan La, 5,840 metres (19,160 ft)separates the Barpu from the Chogo Lungma, and links the two ranges. On the southeast, the Braldu River separates the range from the somewhat lower Mango Gusor Mountains.

== See also ==
- Mountain ranges of Pakistan
