= Mustagh Pass =

Mountain pass in China and Pakistan

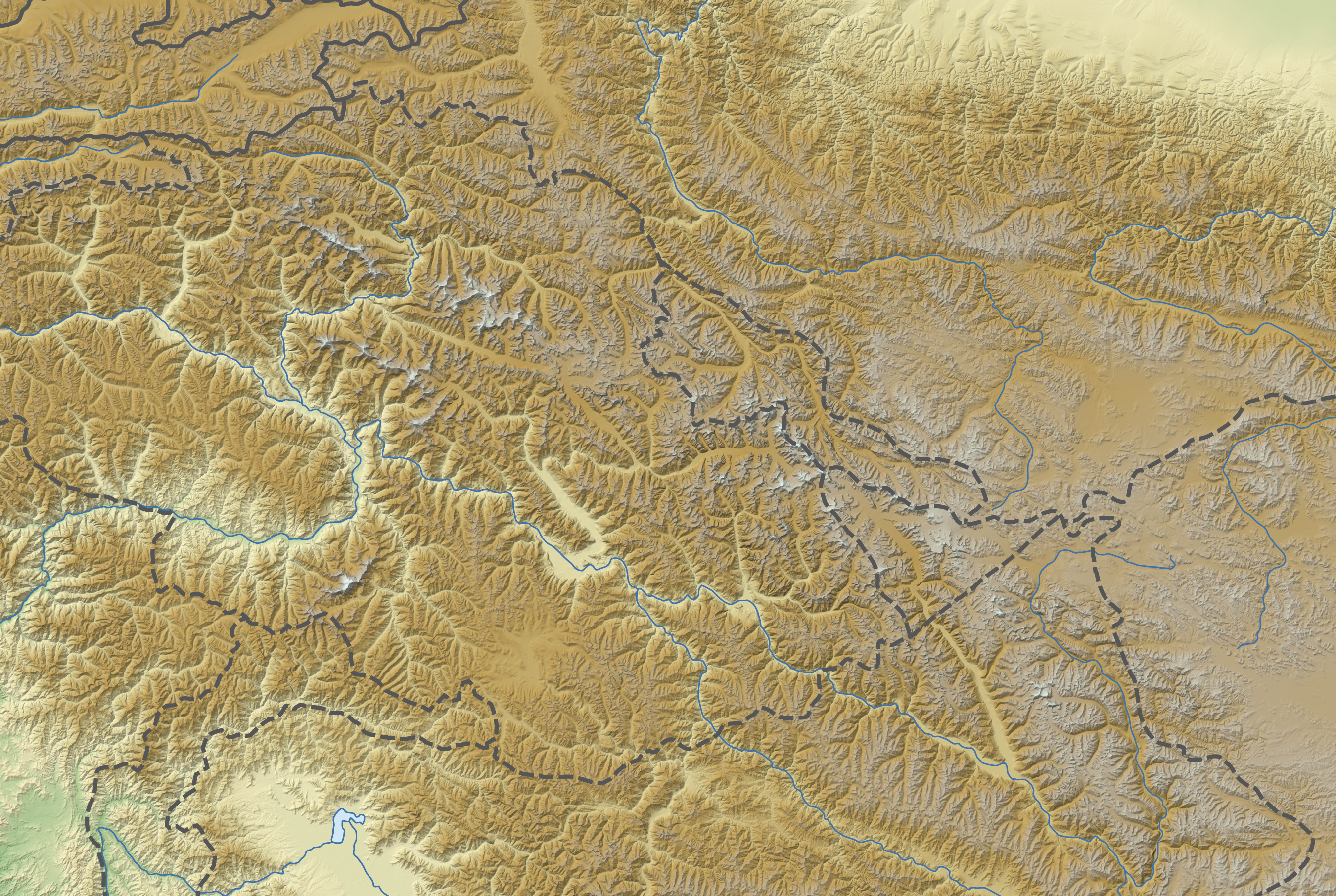
- Location within Southern Xinjiang Location within Karakoram Location within Gilgit Baltistan
- Interactive map of Mustagh Pass

Third Approach
- Location: Taxkorgan, Kashgar, Xinjiang, China - Baltistan, Gilgit-Baltistan, Pakistan
- Range: Baltoro Muztagh, Karakorum Mountains
- Coordinates: 35.8398171°N 76.2508701°E

Mustagh Pass
- Traditional Chinese: (东)木斯塔山口
- Simplified Chinese: (东)木斯塔山口
Transcriptions
Standard Mandarin
- Hanyu Pinyin: jīlǐkè dábǎn

Alternative Chinese name
- Traditional Chinese: 穆斯塔山口
- Simplified Chinese: 穆斯塔山口
Transcriptions
Standard Mandarin
- Hanyu Pinyin: kèlǐkè shānkǒu

The Mustagh Pass or Muztagh Pass (Chinese: (东)木斯塔山口) is a mountain pass across the Baltoro Muztagh subrange within the Karakoram, which includes K2, the world's second highest mountain. The crest of the Baltoro Muztagh marks the present border between Pakistani and Chinese territory. Sarpo Laggo Pass is a 6,013-meter (19,728 ft)-high mountain pass at 35.8234°N 76.16249°E near Mustagh Pass.

According to Francis Younghusband, there are actually two passes, the eastern or 'Old' Mustagh Pass (alt. about 5,422 m.) and the so-called 'New' Mustagh Pass, about 16 km (9.9 mi) to the west (altitude variously given as 5,700 and 5,800 m.) The pass is on the watershed between the rivers which flow towards the Tarim Basin and those flowing to the Indian Ocean.

== Description ==
The route across the Mustagh Pass is the shortest route from Yarkand to Skardu on the upper Indus River in Baltistan, from where caravans used to head on to Srinigar in Kashmir. The pass is situated about midway between the Karakoram Pass to the east, which leads to Leh in Ladakh, and the Kilik and Mintaka passes to the west which lead to Hunza and Gilgit.

The route has been impassible to caravans since at least the middle of the 19th century due to the movement of the glaciers on it and, by 1861, when Godwin-Austen did his survey of the region, it was only in use by a few Baltis living in Yarkand who crossed it to visit their families. Frederic Drew reported that there had been no crossings between Yarkand and Baltistan between 1863 and 1870.

"The old Mustagh Pass to the east had been out of use for thirty or forty years, on account of the accumulation of ice upon it, in consequence of which a new pass had been sought for, and another one to the west had been found. This latter pass had been in partial use up to ten years ago. No European had, however, crossed either of them, but Colonel Godwin-Austen in 1862 came very near the summit of the new pass from the southern side, when he was obliged to turn back on account of bad weather."

== History ==
There was apparently more abundant fodder and fuel along the Yarkand River than on the approaches to the Karakoram Pass:

"Turdi Kol took me a few miles further down the river and showed me two other equally good camping-grounds, and he says that there is considerably more pasture in the lower part of this valley than in that of the Karakash River, where Shahidula is situated, and that in the old days the valley was populated and cultivated and merchants went to and fro by the Mustagh Pass to Baltistan."

Francis Younghusband (1863-1942) was the first European known to cross the pass which he did with much difficulty in 1887 after a request from Colonel Mark Sever Bell (1843-1906), finally reaching the village of Askole in Baltistan.

Apparently there have only been two recorded crossings of the pass since then, "by an Italian expedition of exploration in 1929, and a French ski expedition in 1986."

As part of the China–Pakistan Economic Corridor investments, plans have emerged to upgrade the pass, shortening the distance between Shigar and Yarkant by 350 kilometres (220 miles) compared to the Khunjerab Pass.

== See also ==
- Trango Glacier
