= Masherbrum Mountains =

Mountain range

Masherbrum Mountains ما شربرم پہاڑیاں
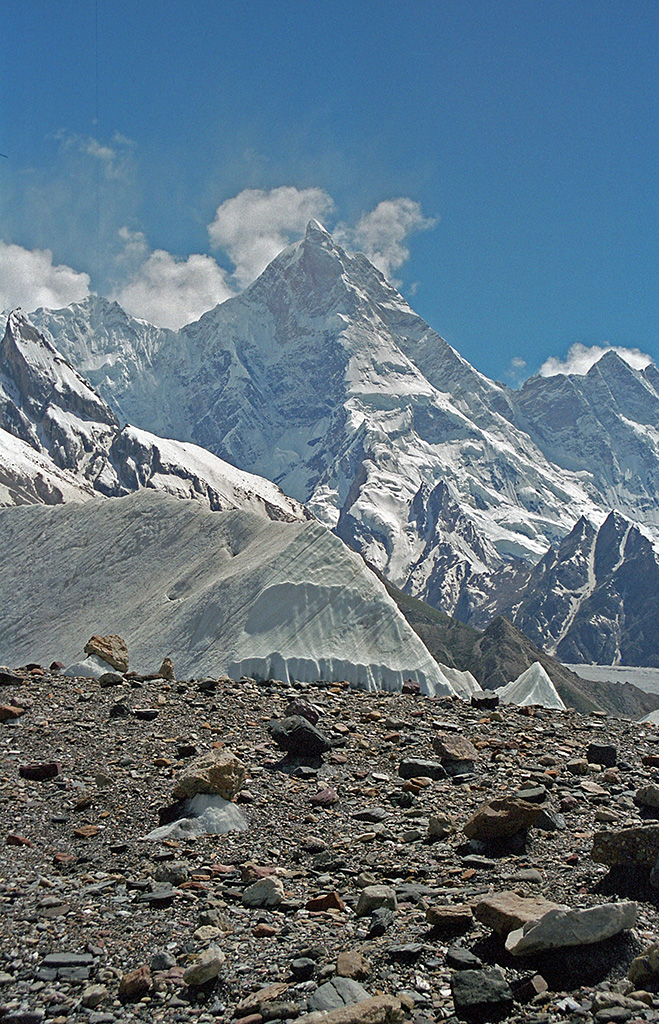
- Masherbrum

Highest point
- Peak: Masherbrum
- Elevation: 7,821 m (25,659 ft)
- Coordinates: 35°38′33″N 76°18′39″E

Geography
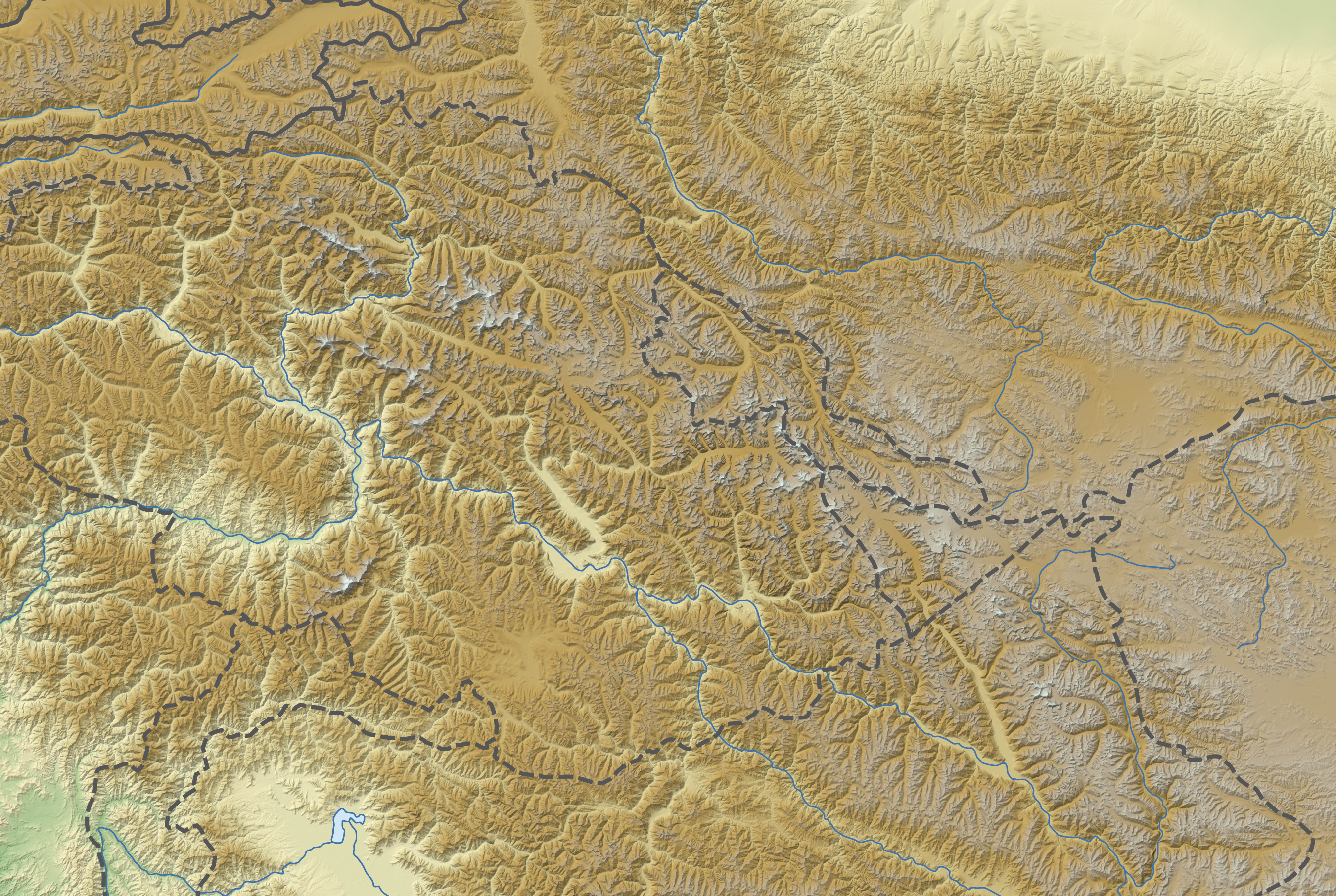
- Location within Karakoram Location within Gilgit Baltistan
- Country: Pakistan
- Region(s): Ghanche District, Baltistan
- Parent range: Karakoram

The Masherbrum Mountains (Urdu: ما شربرم پہاڑیاں) are a subrange of the Karakoram mountains, located in Ghanche District in the Baltistan region of Pakistan-administered Kashmir.

== Geography ==
The Masherbrum Mountains are located on the south side of the Baltoro Glacier. The southern side of the range, in the Indus River basin, is drained by the Hushe River.

While not as famous as the Baltoro Muztagh mountains, which lies across the Baltoro Glacier, the Masherbrum Mountains contain some of the highest peaks in the world (highest 7,821 metres (25,659 ft)). They attract climbers from around the planet.

== Selected peaks ==
The following is a table of the peaks in the Masherbrum Mountains which are over 7,200 metres (23,620 ft) in elevation and have over 500 metres (1,640 ft) of topographic prominence. (This is a common criterion for peaks of this stature to be independent.)

Mountain	Height (m)	Height (ft)	Coordinates	Prominence (m)	Parent mountain	First ascent	Ascents (attempts)
Masherbrum	7,821	25,659	35°38′24″N 76°18′21″E	2,457	Gasherbrum I	1960	4 (9)
Chogolisa	7,665	25,148	35°36′51″N 76°34′45″E	1,624	Masherbrum	1975	4 (2)
Baltoro Kangri	7,312	23,990	35°38′21″N 76°40′24″E	1,040	Chogolisa	1976	1 (0)
Baltistan Peak (K6)	7,282	23,891	35°25′00″N 76°33′03″E	1,962	Chogolisa	1970	1 (3)

=== Other peaks ===
Other notable peaks include the following ones in the Hushe Valley region:

- Link Sar, 7,041 m
- K7, 6,934 m
- Kapura, 6,544 m
- Drifika, 6,447 m

== See also ==
- List of mountains in Pakistan
- List of highest mountains

== Sources ==
- Jerzy Wala, Orographical Sketch Map of the Karakoram, Swiss Foundation for Alpine Research, Zurich, 1990.
- Andy Fanshawe and Stephen Venables, Himalaya Alpine-Style, Hodder and Stoughton, 1995.
