= Uzma Yousaf =

Pakistani mountaineer

- Born: Peshawar, Pakistan
- Occupation: Mountaineer

Uzma Yousuf (Urdu: عظمیٰ یوسف) is a Pakistani mountaineer. She is the first female Pakistani mountaineer who climbed 7027m high Spantik Peak (also known as Golden Peak), located in the Nagar valley of Gilgit-Baltistan.

== Personal life ==
Yousuf is basically from Peshawar Pakistan. Belonging to a sports family, Yousuf always aimed to be a sportswoman, but due to social barriers, she could not pursue her career in sports. She is married and has 2 children.

Yousuf started her climbing career by climbing 6050m high Mingling Sar Mountain located in Shimshal valley of Hunza Gilgit Baltistan. Although Yousuf was not professionally trained for climbing mountains during her first climbing at Mingling Sar Mountain, yet she scaled it. Right after her first achievement, Yousaf made her second achievement by climbing Spantik mountain on 2 August 2017.

Yousaf was stopped to trek the Nanga Parbat base camp by her family saying that she can't do it, which is why she pursued climbing as a career to prove that women can also climb mountains like men.

== Mountaineering achievements ==
- 2016: Expedition to Mingling Sar Mountain in 2016
- 2017: First Pakistani woman to climb Spantik peak.
