= Yengisogat =

Mountain range in Xinjiang, China

Coordinates: 36.0000°N 76.0000°E

The Yengisogat range (音苏盖提), also known as the Wesm Mountains, is a Chinese subrange of the Karakoram mountain range. It lies north of the Baltoro Muztagh, home of the eight-thousanders of the Karakoram. Administratively it is located in Xinjiang. The highest peak of the subrange is Huangguan Shan, or Crown Peak, 7,265 m (23,835 ft) (also sometimes given as 7,295 m/23,934 ft).
