= Rattu =

Village in Astore, Pakistan

Coordinates: 35°09′N 74°48′E

Rattu is a small town of the Astore district in Gilgit Baltistan, Pakistan. Rattu has been traditionally used as a route for traders going to Kashmir from Astore, Gilgit and others parts of present-day Gilgit Baltistan.

== Geography and Climate ==
Rattu lies at an elevation of approximately 2,650 meters (8,700 feet) above sea level, surrounded by lush green valleys and snow-capped peaks. Its cool summers and harsh winters define the region's distinct climate. During winter, the village is often blanketed in snow, making it an ideal location for winter sports. The area’s geography includes alpine pastures, dense forests, and glacial streams that contribute to its biodiversity.

== Tourism and Adventure Sports ==
Rattu has gained prominence as a destination for adventure sports and ecotourism. The village boasts a natural skiing slope, making it a key location for winter sports training in Pakistan. The Pakistan Army’s High Altitude School is located in the more than a century old Rattu Cantonment. It offers specialized training for high-altitude survival and winter sports.

== See also ==
- Rattu Cantonment
