= Rattu Cantonment =

Coordinates: 35.142548273277°N 74.79311181037332°E

Rattu Cantonment (Urdu: رٹو چھاؤنی) is a century plus old cantonment located at Rattu in Astore district of Gilgit Baltistan, Pakistan. It is located at an altitude of 2743 m above sea level. During the summer, the weather remains pleasant but winters are harsh and temperatures range from -35 °C to roughly 20 °C. Rattu receives three to six feet of snow during the winter.

The Army High Altitude School of Pakistan Army is based at Rattu Cantonment. The cantonment is surrounded by two rivers, namely the Kalapani and Mir Malik. Mountain craft training sites, river crossing sites and ski slopes are located within the cantonment. It also serves as the army base camp to communicate across other northern regions of Pakistan.

== See also ==
- Northern Light Infantry
- X Corps
- Force Command Northern Areas
- Special Security Division
