= K6 (mountain) =

Mountain in Pakistan

K6 کے 6
- Baltistan Peak
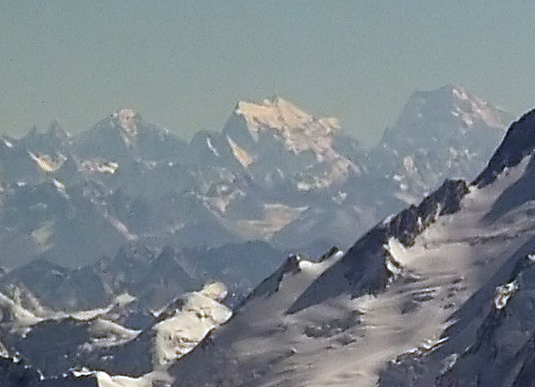
- K6 (middle) and Saltoro Kangri (right) from the air in 2011

Highest point
- Elevation: 7,282 m (23,891 ft); Ranked 88th
- Prominence: 1,962 m (6,437 ft)
- Listing: Ultra
- Coordinates: 35°25′12″N 76°33′00″E

Geography
- Location within Pakistan Location within Gilgit Baltistan
- The major peaks in Karakoram are rank identified by height. Legend: 1：K2; 2：Gasherbrum I, K5; 3：Broad Peak; 4：Gasherbrum II, K4; 5：Gasherbrum III, K3a; 6：Gasherbrum IV, K3; 7：Distaghil Sar; 8：Kunyang Chhish; 9：Masherbrum, K1; 10：Batura Sar, Batura I; 11：Rakaposhi; 12：Batura II; 13：Kanjut Sar; 14：Saltoro Kangri, K10; 15：Batura III; 16： Saser Kangri I, K22; 17：Chogolisa; 18：Shispare; 19：Trivor Sar; 20：Skyang Kangri; 21：Mamostong Kangri, K35; 22：Saser Kangri II; 23：Saser Kangri III; 24：Pumari Chhish; 25：Passu Sar; 26：Yukshin Gardan Sar; 27：Teram Kangri I; 28：Malubiting; 29：K12; 30：Sia Kangri; 31：Momhil Sar; 32：Skil Brum; 33：Haramosh Peak; 34：Ghent Kangri; 35：Ultar Sar; 36：Rimo Massif; 37：Sherpi Kangri; 38：Yazghil Dome South; 39：Baltoro Kangri; 40：Crown Peak; 41：Baintha Brakk; 42：Yutmaru Sar; 43：K6; 44：Muztagh Tower; 45：Diran; 46：Apsarasas Kangri I; 47：Rimo III; 48：Gasherbrum V; Location in Gilgit-Baltistan
- Location: Gilgit-Baltistan, Pakistan-controlled Kashmir (Note: The mountain is located on the western side of the Line of Control between India and Pakistan.)
- Parent range: Masherbrum Mountains, Karakoram

Climbing
- First ascent: 1970 by von der Hecken, G. Haberl, E. Koblmüller, G. Pressl
- Easiest route: glacier/snow/ice climb

K6
- Simplified Chinese: 巴爾蒂斯坦峰 （K6峰）
Transcriptions

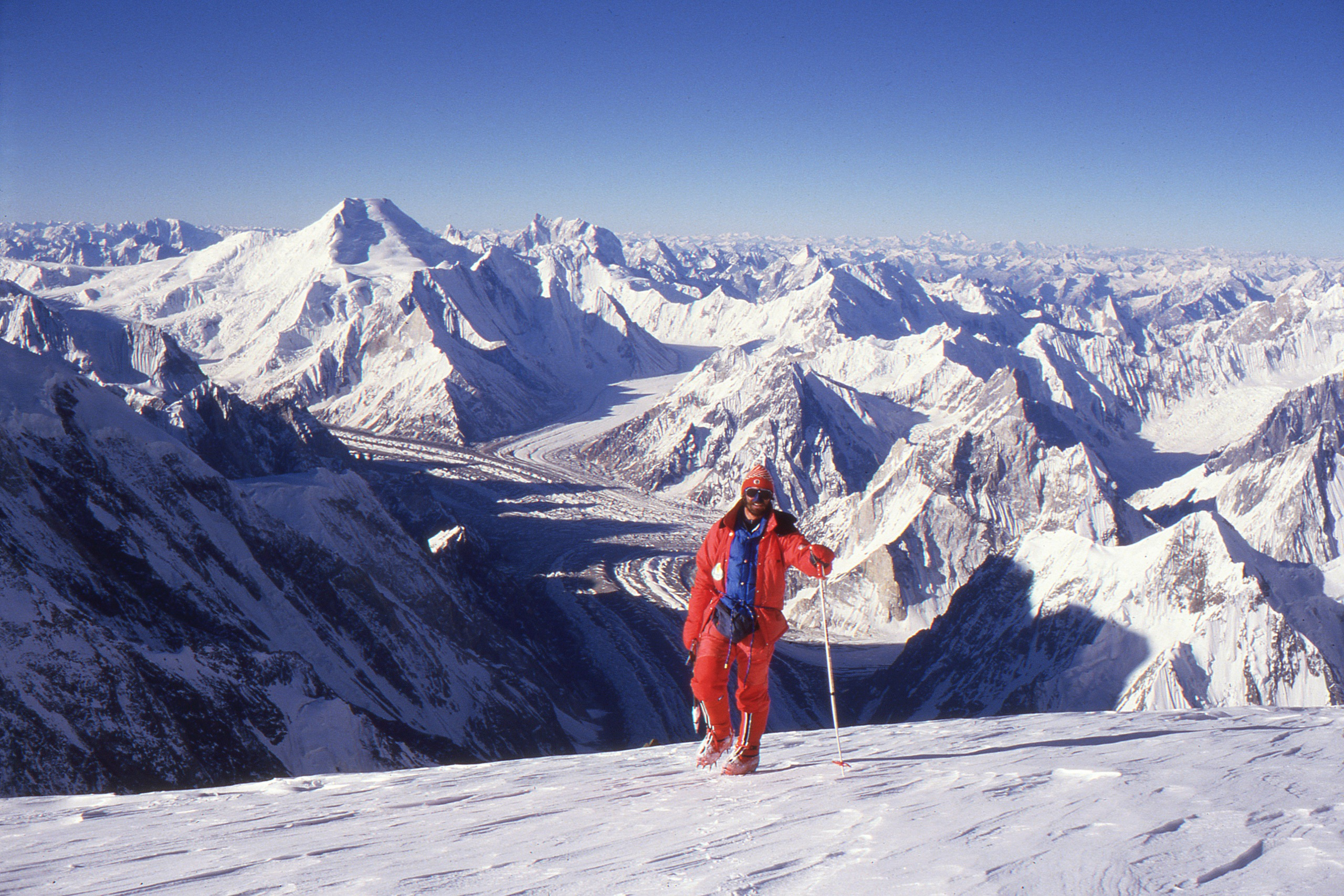
K6 is shown in the background of this photo, 21.7 km (13.5 miles) from Chogolisa. At the foot of Chogolisa is Vigne Glacier.

Surveyed as K6 (Urdu: کے 6), but also known as Baltistan Peak, it is a notable peak of the Masherbrum Mountains, a subrange of the Karakoram mountain range in the Gilgit-Baltistan region of Pakistan. Despite being much lower than the adjoining Eight-thousanders and high 7000m peaks such as Masherbrum, K6 has huge, steep faces, and great relief above the nearby valleys.

== Location ==
K6 is the highest peak in the area surrounding the Charakusa Glacier, a region which has seen renewed climbing interest in recent years. This glacier lies at the head of the Hushe Valley, which in turn leads to the Shyok River and thence to the Indus River. The Charakusa gives access to the north side of K6; to the southwest of the peak is the small Nangmah (or "Nangpah") Glacier, and to the east is the larger Kaberi Glacier and the Kaberi River valley.

== History ==
The first ascent of K6 was in 1970, by an Austrian expedition, which was led by Eduard Koblmueller and included Gerhard Haberl, Christian von der Hecken and Gerd Pressl via the Southeast Ridge from the Nangmah Glacier. The expedition had originally planned to climb Malubiting but the Pakistan government withdrew this permission after the team arrived in the country. K6 was allotted to the team instead.

The Himalayan Index lists three additional attempts, but no additional ascents, on K6.
