= Karakoram =

Mountain range spanning the borders between Pakistan, India and China

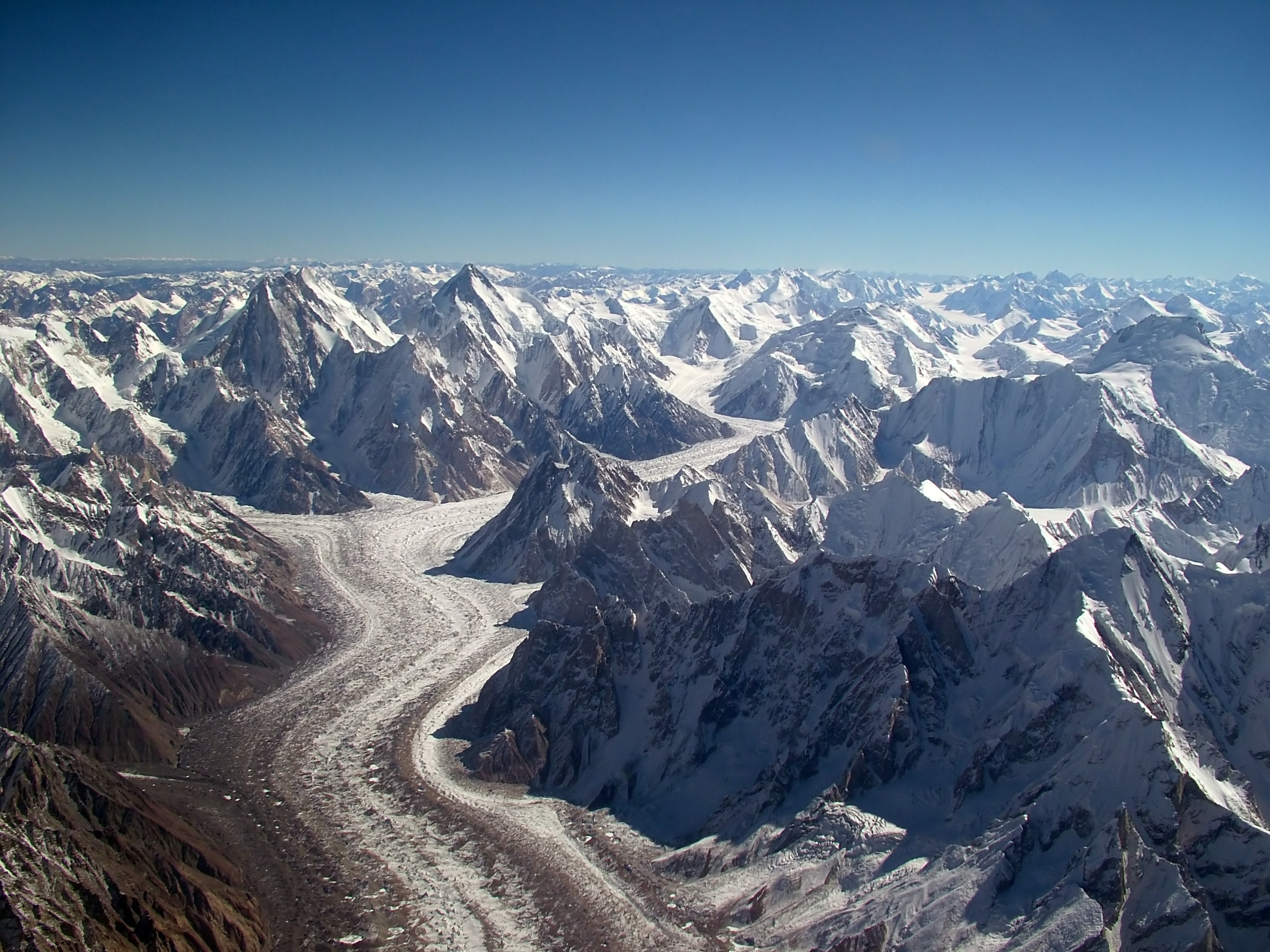
- Baltoro Glacier in the Central Karakoram Gilgit-Baltistan, Pakistan

Highest point
- Peak: K2
- Elevation: 8,611 m (28,251 ft)
- Coordinates: 35°52′57″N 76°30′48″E

Dimensions
- Length: 500 km (310 mi)

Geography
- Interactive map outlining Karakoram range
- Countries: China; India; Pakistan; Tajikistan
- Regions/Provinces: Gilgit-Baltistan; Ladakh; Xinjiang
- Range coordinates: 36°N 76°E
- Borders on: Pamir Mountains; Hindu Kush; Kunlun Mountains; Himalayas; Ladakh Range

Karakoram

Chinese name
- Chinese: 喀喇昆仑山脉
- Hanyu Pinyin: Kālǎ Kūnlún shānmài
- Literal meaning: "Kara-Kunlun mountain range"
Transcriptions
Standard Mandarin
- Hanyu Pinyin: Kālǎ Kūnlún shānmài

Tibetan name
- Tibetan: ཁར་ཁོ་རུམ་རི
Transcriptions
- Wylie: kha ra kho rum ri

Uyghur name
- Uyghur: قاراقورام

The Karakoram (English: /ˌkɑːrəˈkɔːrəm, ˌkær-/, Urdu: [kaːɾaːkoːɾəm]) is a mountain range in Asia which spans the borders of Pakistan, China and India, (Note: The sovereignty over the Kashmir region is disputed and the region is partly administered by Pakistan, India and China.) with the north-western extremities extending into Afghanistan and Tajikistan. The Karakoram contains four of the fourteen eight-thousanders, the highest of which is K2, the second highest mountain on Earth.

The Karakoram begins in the Wakhan Corridor in eastern Afghanistan and extends eastwards into Indian-administered Ladakh and Chinese-administered Aksai Chin, as well as the Chinese province of Xinjiang. Most of the Karakoram is located within the Pakistani-administered Gilgit-Baltistan region. The Karakoram is bounded on the east by the Aksai Chin plateau, on the north-east by the edge of the Tibetan Plateau, and on the north by the river valleys of the Yarkand and Karakash rivers, beyond which lie the Kunlun Mountains. At the north-west corner are the Pamir Mountains, while to the west lies Hindu Kush. The southern boundary of the Karakoram is formed west to east by the Gilgit, Indus, and Shyok rivers, which separate the range from the north-western end of the Himalaya. These rivers flow north-west before making an abrupt turn south-westwards towards the plains of Pakistan. Roughly in the middle of the Karakoram range is the Karakoram Pass, which was part of a now unused trade route between Ladakh and Yarkand.

The Karakoram lies north of the Kashmir Valley and forms part of the wider mountain system surrounding the valley, together with the Pir Panjal and Zanskar ranges.

The range is about 500 km (311 mi) in length and is the most glaciated place on Earth outside the polar regions. The Siachen Glacier (76 km (47 mi) long) and Biafo Glacier (63 km (39 mi) long) are the second- and third-longest glaciers outside the polar regions. The Karakoram is the second-highest mountain range on Earth and part of a complex of ranges that includes the Pamir Mountains, Hindu Kush, and the Himalayas. The range contains eighteen summits higher than 7,500 m (24,600 ft) in elevation, with four above 8,000 m (26,000 ft) which include K2, Gasherbrum I, Broad Peak, and Gasherbrum II.

== Name ==
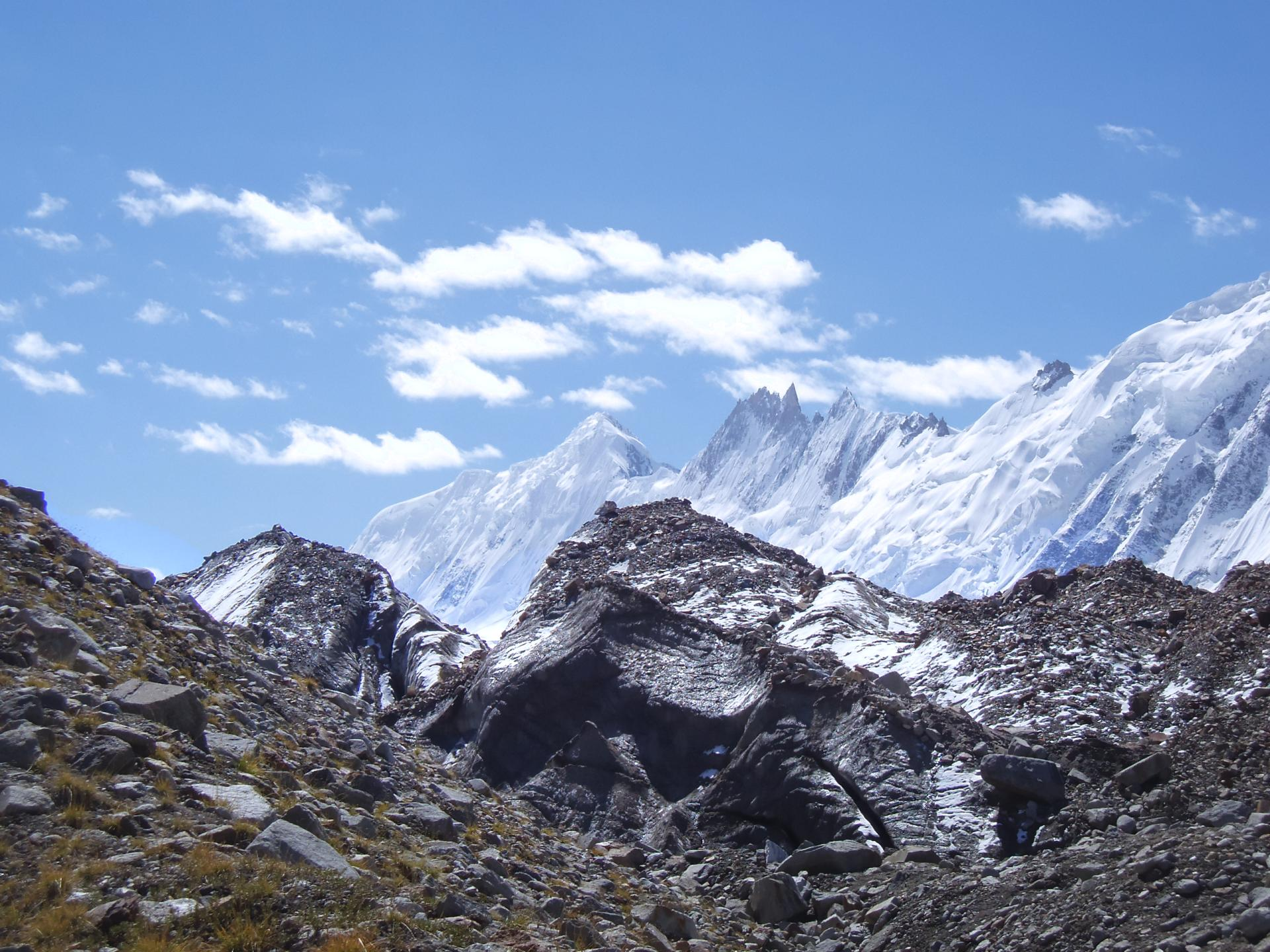
The black gravel of the Karakoram mountains, as seen near Pakistan's Biafo Glacier

Karakoram is a Turkic term meaning black gravel. The Central Asian traders originally applied the name to the Karakoram Pass. Early European travelers, including William Moorcroft and George Hayward, started using the term for the range of mountains west of the pass, although they also used the term Muztagh (meaning, "Ice Mountain"). Thomas Montgomerie of the Survey of India labelled its high peaks K1 to K6 ("K" for Karakoram), identifying them from his station at Mount Haramukh in the 1850s.

In the Sanskrit literature (the Puranas), the Karakoram mountains were called Krishnagiri (black mountains), with vernacular variations of Kanhagiri and Kanheri. Krishnagiri is also associated with older Indian geographical traditions concerning the Karakoram range. The Sanskrit name, meaning "black mountain", has been compared with the Turkic name Karakoram, commonly interpreted as "black gravel"; however, a direct historical or linguistic relationship between the two names has not been established.

== Exploration ==
Due to its altitude and ruggedness, the Karakoram is much less inhabited than parts of the Himalayas further east. European explorers first visited in the early 19th century, followed by British surveyors starting in 1856.

The Muztagh Pass was crossed in 1887 by the expedition of Colonel Francis Younghusband, and the valleys above the Hunza River were explored by General Sir George K. Cockerill in 1892. Explorations in the 1910s and 1920s established most of the geography of the region.

The name Karakoram was used in the early 20th century, for example by Kenneth Mason, for the range now known as the Baltoro Muztagh. The term is now used to refer to the entire range from the Batura Muztagh above Hunza in the west to the Saser Muztagh in the bend of the Shyok River in the east.

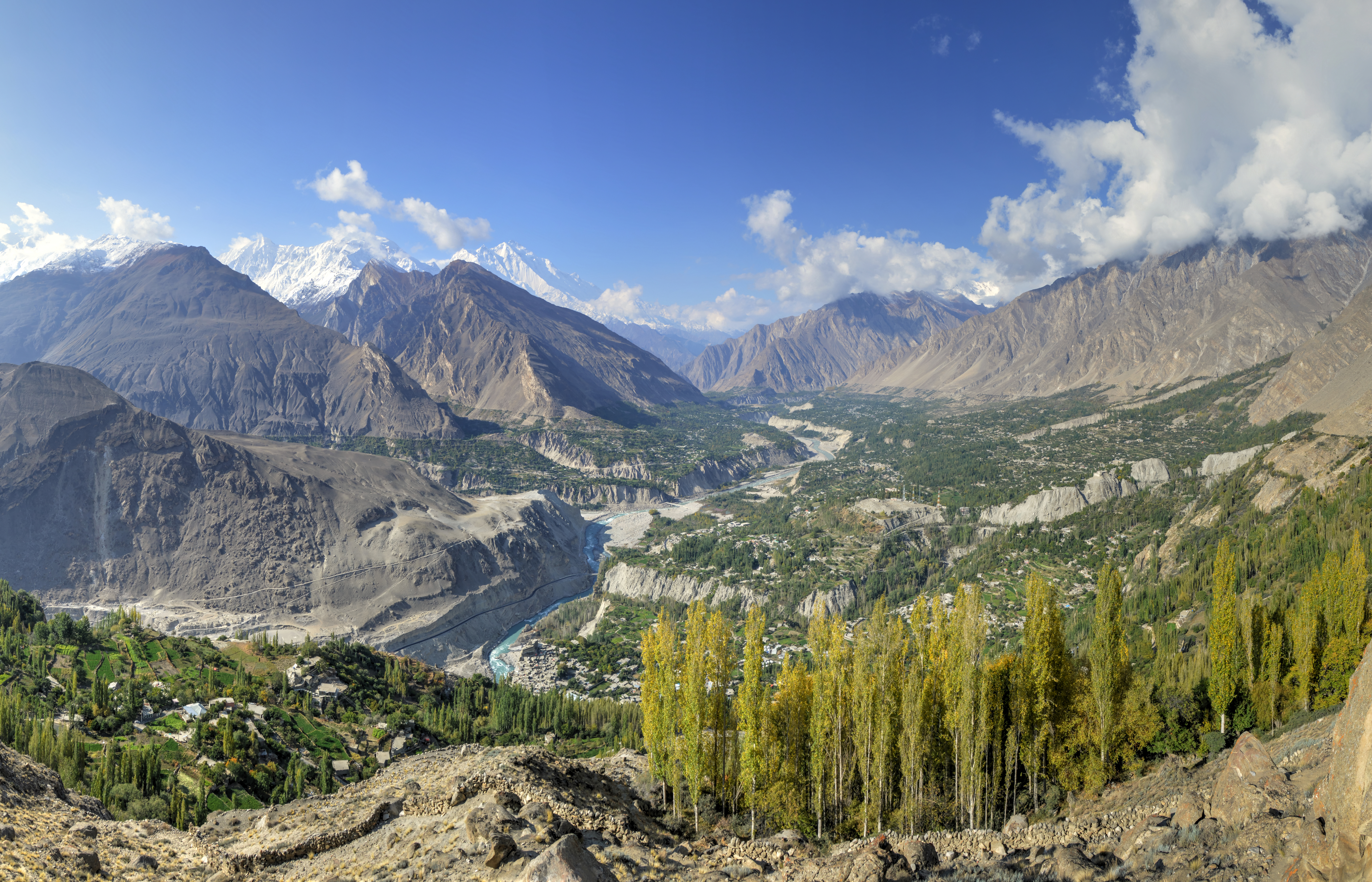
Hunza Valley in the Gilgit-Baltistan region, administered by Pakistan

Floral surveys were carried out in the Shyok River catchment and from Panamik to Turtuk village by Chandra Prakash Kala during 1999 and 2000.

== Geology and glaciers ==
The Karakoram is in one of the world's most geologically active areas, at the plate boundary between the Indo-Australian plate and the Eurasian plate. A significant part, somewhere between 28 and 50 percent, of the Karakoram Range is glaciated, covering an area of more than 15,000 square kilometres or 5,800 square miles, compared to between 8 and 12 percent of the Himalaya and 2.2 percent of the Alps. Mountain glaciers may serve as an indicator of climate change, advancing and receding with long-term changes in temperature and precipitation. The Karakoram glaciers are slightly retreating, unlike the Himalayas, where glaciers are losing mass at a significantly higher rate, many Karakoram glaciers are covered in a layer of rubble which insulates the ice from the warmth of the sun. Where there is no such insulation, the rate of retreat is high. Some recent studies reveal slight increase or stability in glacier mass in central and western Karakoram, termed by some scholars as "Karakoram Anomaly", contrasting with eastern Karakoram where glaciers were found to be retreating. Notable glaciers in Karakoram include:

- Siachen Glacier
- Baltoro Glacier
- Hispar Glacier
- Batura Glacier
- Biafo Glacier
- Chogo Lungma Glacier
- Yinsugaiti Glacier

=== Ice Age ===
In the last ice age, a connected series of glaciers stretched from western Tibet to Nanga Parbat, and from the Tarim Basin to the Gilgit District. To the south, the Indus glacier was the main valley glacier, which flowed 120 kilometres (75 mi) down from the Nanga Parbat massif to 870 metres (2,850 ft) elevation. In the north, the Karakoram glaciers joined those from the Kunlun Mountains and flowed down to 2,000 metres (6,600 ft) in the Tarim Basin.

While the current valley glaciers in the Karakoram reach a maximum length of 76 kilometres (47 mi), several of the ice-age valley glacier branches and main valley glaciers, had lengths up to 700 kilometres (430 mi). During the Ice Age, the glacier snowline was about 1,300 metres (4,300 ft) lower than today.

== Highest peaks ==
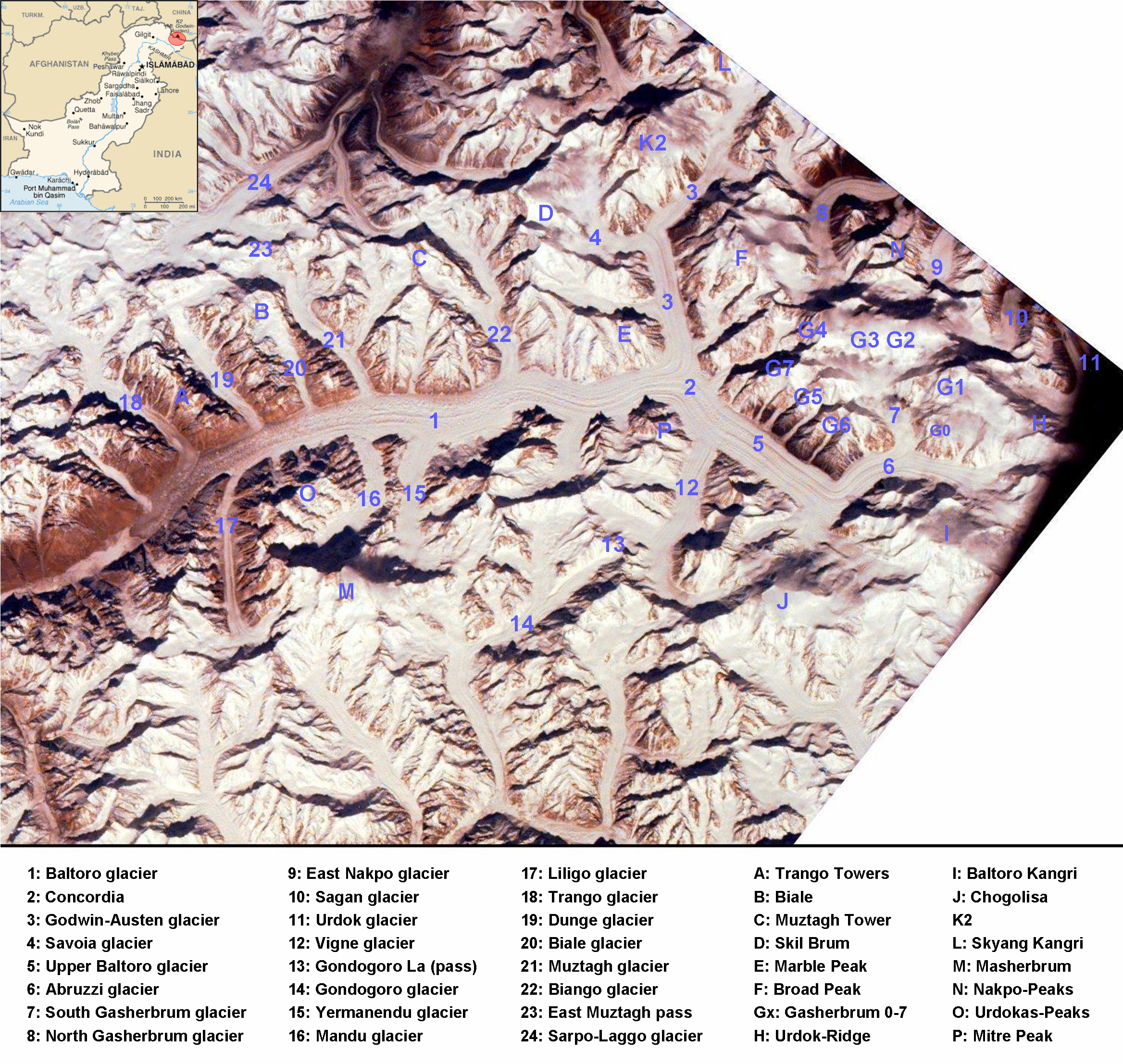
Highest Karakoram peaks in the Baltoro region as seen from the International Space Station

The major peaks in Karakoram are rank identified by height.
Legend
- 1：K2
- 2：Gasherbrum I, K5
- 3：Broad Peak
- 4：Gasherbrum II, K4
- 5：Gasherbrum III, K3a
- 6：Gasherbrum IV, K3
- 7：Distaghil Sar
- 8：Kunyang Chhish
- 9：Masherbrum, K1
- 10：Batura Sar, Batura I
- 11：Rakaposhi
- 12：Batura II
- 13：Kanjut Sar
- 14：Saltoro Kangri, K10
- 15：Batura III
- 16： Saser Kangri I, K22
- 17：Chogolisa
- 18：Shispare
- 19：Trivor Sar
- 20：Skyang Kangri
- 21：Mamostong Kangri, K35
- 22：Saser Kangri II
- 23：Saser Kangri III
- 24：Pumari Chhish
- 25：Passu Sar
- 26：Yukshin Gardan Sar
- 27：Teram Kangri I
- 28：Malubiting
- 29：K12
- 30：Sia Kangri
- 31：Momhil Sar
- 32：Skil Brum
- 33：Haramosh Peak
- 34：Ghent Kangri
- 35：Ultar Sar
- 36：Rimo Massif
- 37：Sherpi Kangri
- 38：Yazghil Dome South
- 39：Baltoro Kangri
- 40：Crown Peak
- 41：Baintha Brakk
- 42：Yutmaru Sar
- 43：K6
- 44：Muztagh Tower
- 45：Diran
- 46：Apsarasas Kangri I
- 47：Rimo III
- 48：Gasherbrum V

The majority of the highest peaks are in the Gilgit–Baltistan region administered by Pakistan. Baltistan has more than 100 mountain peaks exceeding 6,100 metres (20,000 ft) height from sea level. Following is a list of the highest peaks of the Karakoram. Included are some of the mountains named with a K code, the most well-known of which is K2.

Mountain	Height	Ranked	K code	Area administered by
K2	8,611 metres (28,251 ft)	2	K2	Pakistan–China, at the head of the Godwin-Austen Glacier
Gasherbrum I	8,080 metres (26,510 ft)	11	K5	China–Pakistan
Broad Peak	8,051 metres (26,414 ft)	12		China–Pakistan
Gasherbrum II	8,034 metres (26,358 ft)	13	K4	China–Pakistan
Gasherbrum III	7,952 metres (26,089 ft)		K3a	Pakistan
Gasherbrum IV	7,925 metres (26,001 ft)	17	K3	Pakistan
Distaghil Sar	7,885 metres (25,869 ft)	19		Pakistan
Kunyang Chhish	7,852 metres (25,761 ft)	21		Pakistan
Masherbrum I	7,821 metres (25,659 ft)	22	K1	Pakistan
Batura I	7,795 metres (25,574 ft)	25		Pakistan
Rakaposhi	7,788 metres (25,551 ft)	26		Pakistan
Batura II	7,762 metres (25,466 ft)			Pakistan
Kanjut Sar	7,760 metres (25,460 ft)	28		Pakistan
Saltoro Kangri I	7,742 metres (25,400 ft)	31	K10	India–Pakistan
Batura III	7,729 metres (25,358 ft)			Pakistan
Saltoro Kangri II	7,705 metres (25,279 ft)		K11	India–Pakistan
Saser Kangri I	7,672 metres (25,171 ft)	35	K22	India
Chogolisa	7,665 metres (25,148 ft)	36		Pakistan
Shispare Sar	7,611 metres (24,970 ft)	38		Pakistan
Trivor Sar	7,577 metres (24,859 ft)	39		Pakistan
Skyang Kangri	7,545 metres (24,754 ft)	43		China–Pakistan
Mamostong Kangri	7,516 metres (24,659 ft)	47	K35	India
Saser Kangri II	7,513 metres (24,649 ft)	48		India
Saser Kangri III	7,495 metres (24,590 ft)	51		India
Pumari Chhish	7,492 metres (24,580 ft)	53		Pakistan
Passu Sar	7,478 metres (24,534 ft)	54		Pakistan
Yukshin Gardan Sar	7,469 metres (24,505 ft)	55		Pakistan
Teram Kangri I	7,462 metres (24,482 ft)	56		China–India
Malubiting	7,458 metres (24,469 ft)	58		Pakistan
K12 or Saitang Peak	7,428 metres (24,370 ft)	61	K12	India–Pakistan subsidiary of Saltoro Kangri
Sia Kangri	7,422 metres (24,350 ft)	63		China–Pakistan
Skilma Gangri or Ghursay Kangri II	7,422 metres (24,350 ft)		K8	Pakistan, on the western flank of the Siachen Glacier
Momhil Sar	7,414 metres (24,324 ft)	64		Pakistan
Skil Brum	7,410 metres (24,310 ft)	66		China–Pakistan
Haramosh Peak	7,409 metres (24,308 ft)	67		Pakistan
Ghent Kangri	7,401 metres (24,281 ft)	69		India–Pakistan
Ultar Peak	7,388 metres (24,239 ft)	70		Pakistan
Rimo I	7,385 metres (24,229 ft)	71		India
Sherpi Kangri	7,380 metres (24,210 ft)	74		Pakistan
Bojohagur Duanasir	7,329 metres (24,045 ft)			Pakistan
Yazghil Dome South	7,324 metres (24,029 ft)			Pakistan
Baltoro Kangri	7,312 metres (23,990 ft)	81		Pakistan
Crown Peak	7,295 metres (23,934 ft)	83		China
Baintha Brakk	7,285 metres (23,901 ft)	86		Pakistan
Yutmaru Sar	7,283 metres (23,894 ft)	87		Pakistan
Baltistan Peak	7,282 metres (23,891 ft)	88	K6	Pakistan
Muztagh Tower	7,273 metres (23,862 ft)	90		China–Pakistan
Diran	7,266 metres (23,839 ft)	92		Pakistan
Apsarasas Kangri I	7,243 metres (23,763 ft)	95		China–India
Rimo III	7,233 metres (23,730 ft)	97		India
Gasherbrum V	7,147 metres (23,448 ft)			Pakistan
Link Sar	7,041 metres (23,100 ft)			Pakistan
Gamba Gangri	7,000 metres (23,000 ft) (approx)		K9	Pakistan near Trango Towers
Gomgma Gangri	6,934 metres (22,749 ft)		K7	Pakistan at the head of the Charakusa Valley
Dansam Peak	6,666 metres (21,870 ft)		K13	Pakistan south west of Saltoro Kangri
Paiju Peak	6,610 metres (21,686 ft)			Pakistan
Pastan Kangri	6,523 metres (21,401 ft)		K25	India south of Saltoro Kangri

== Subranges ==
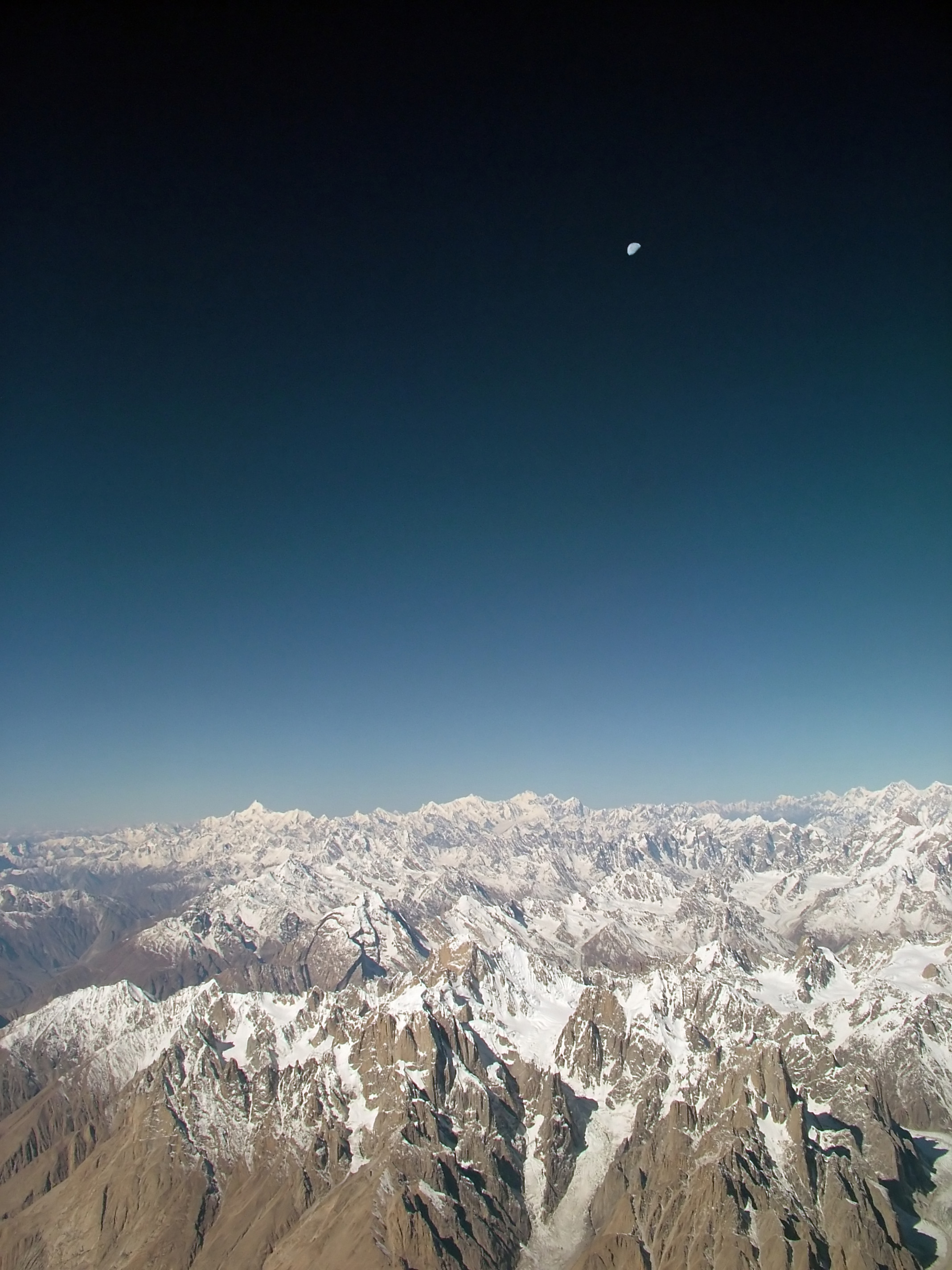
View of the Moon over Karakoram Range in Pakistan

The naming and division of the various subranges of the Karakoram is not universally agreed upon. However, the following is a list of the most important subranges, following Jerzy Wala. The ranges are listed roughly west to east.

- Batura Muztagh
- Rakaposhi-Haramosh Mountains
- Spantik-Sosbun Mountains
- Hispar Muztagh
- South Ghujerab Mountains
- Panmah Muztagh
- Wesm Mountains
- Masherbrum Mountains
- Baltoro Muztagh
- Saltoro Mountains
- Siachen Muztagh
- Rimo Muztagh
- Saser Muztagh

== Passes ==
Location of the passes in Karakoram
Legend:

1：Sia La, 2：Bilafond La, 3：Gyong La, 4：Sasser Pass, 5：Burji La, 6：Machulo La, 7：Naltar Pass, 8：Hispar Pass, 9：Shimshal Pass, 10：Karakoram Pass, 11：Turkistan La Pass, 12：Windy Gap, 13：Mustagh Pass, 14：Sarpo Laggo Pass, 15：Khunjerab Pass, 16：Mutsjliga Pass, 17：Mintaka Pass, 18：Kilik Pass

Passes from west to east are:

- Dandala Pass is the most important and earlier pass. It starts from Ghursay saitang city to Yarqand in China. It is the main trade route between Khaplu, Ladakh, Kharmang to Yarqand, China.
- Kilik Pass
- Mintaka Pass
- Khunjerab Pass is the highest paved international border crossing at 4,693 m (15,397 ft). It serves the China-Pakistan Friendship Highway, the "8th world wonder".
- Shimshal Pass
- Mustagh Pass
- Karakoram Pass
- Sasser Pass
- Naltar Pass

The Khunjerab Pass is the only motorable pass across the range. The Shimshal Pass (which does not cross an international border) is the only other pass still in regular use.

== Cultural references ==
The Karakoram mountain range has been referred to in a number of novels and movies. Rudyard Kipling refers to the Karakoram mountain range in his novel Kim, which was first published in 1900. Marcel Ichac made a film titled Karakoram, chronicling a French expedition to the range in 1936. The film won the Silver Lion at the Venice Film Festival of 1937. Greg Mortenson details the Karakoram, and specifically K2 and the Balti, extensively in his book Three Cups of Tea, about his quest to build schools for children in the region. K2 Kahani (The K2 Story) by Mustansar Hussain Tarar describes his experiences at K2 base camp.

== See also ==
- Karakoram Highway
- List of mountain ranges of the world
- List of highest mountains (a list of mountains above 7,200 m (23,600 ft))
- Mount Imeon
