= Zharba Lake =

Lake in Pakistan

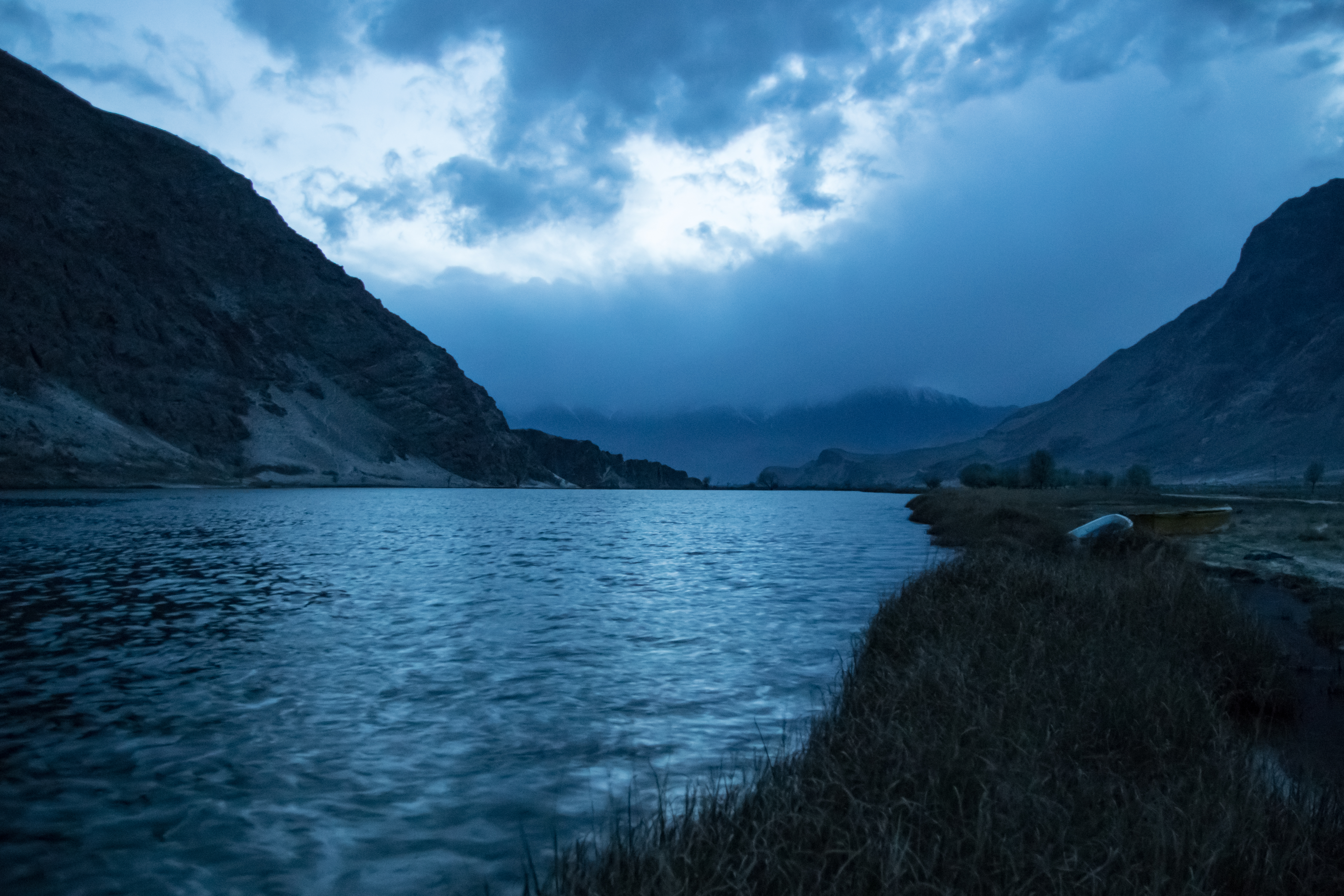
- Zharba Lake

- Location within Pakistan
- Location: Shigar, Gilgit–Baltistan
- Coordinates: 35°21′44″N 75°41′54″E
- Basin countries: Pakistan
- Max. length: 1.4 kilometres (0.87 mi)
- Max. width: 260 metres (850 ft)
- Settlements: Shigar

Zharba Tso or Blind Lake is a panoramic lake near Shigar Valley, Skardu, Gilgit-Baltistan region in Pakistan. The lake is used as a water reservoir for the residents of Shigar Valley. It is fed by the Indus River.

The lake is on the way of Shigar Valley, around 30 minutes' drive from Skardu. It is surrounded by the Indus River on one side and the Shigar River to the other side. It is sometimes used for rafting competitions.
