= Sarfaranga Desert =

Cold desert in Gilgit-Baltistan, Pakistan

Coordinates: 35°21′N 75°41′E

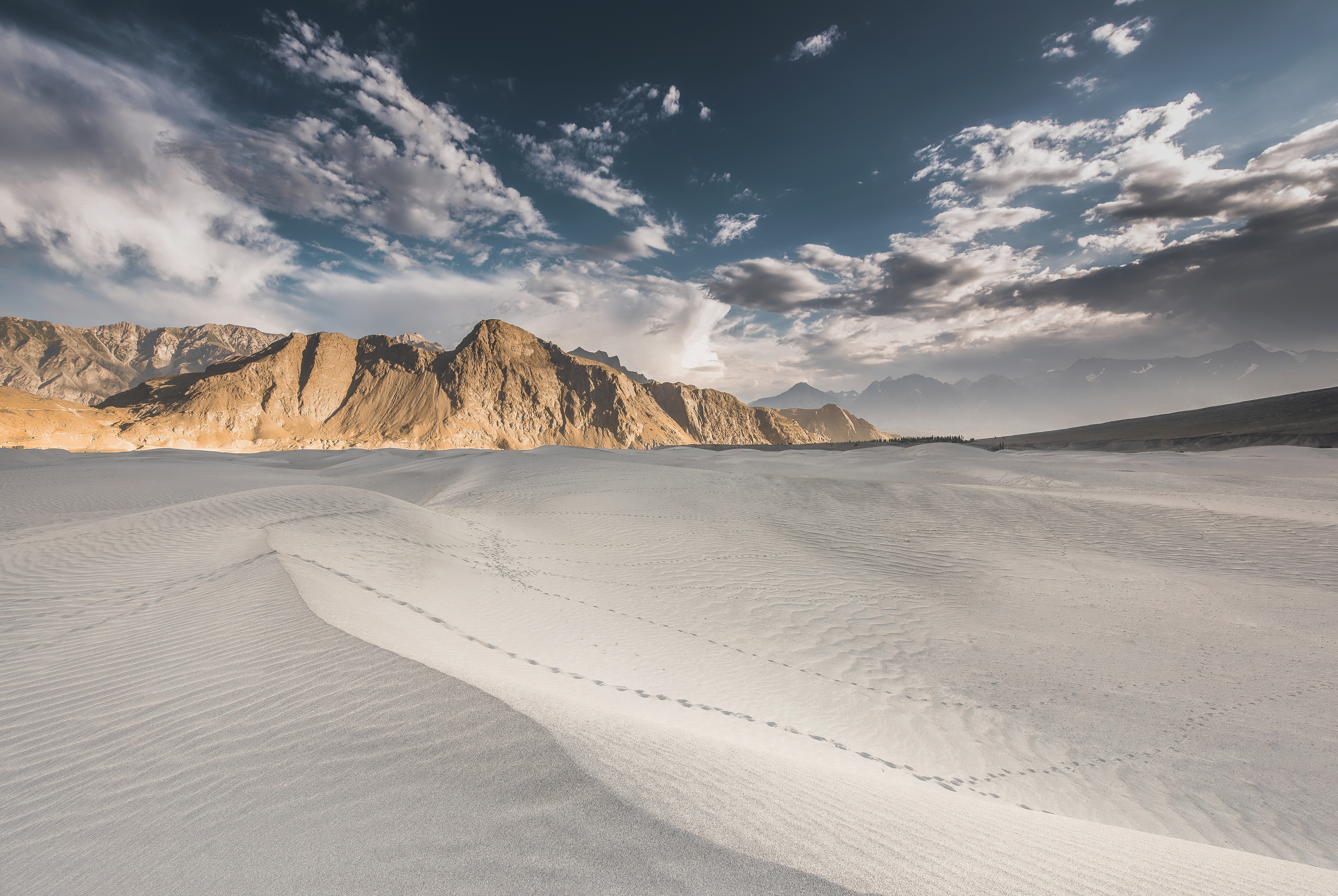
A view of Safaranga Desert, 2017

Sarfaranga Desert (Urdu: صحرائے سرفرنگا), alternatively spelt as Sarfranga, and also known as Safaranga Cold Desert, is a high-altitude cold desert located at the confluence of Shigar River with Indus River, where Shigar Valley opens into Skardu Valley, in Gilgit-Baltistan, Pakistan. It is located at an altitude of 7,500 feet (2,300 m).

The name of the desert is derived from Safaranga village consisting of some 1,500 people, located at its eastern corner along the banks of Shigar River.

== Annual festival ==
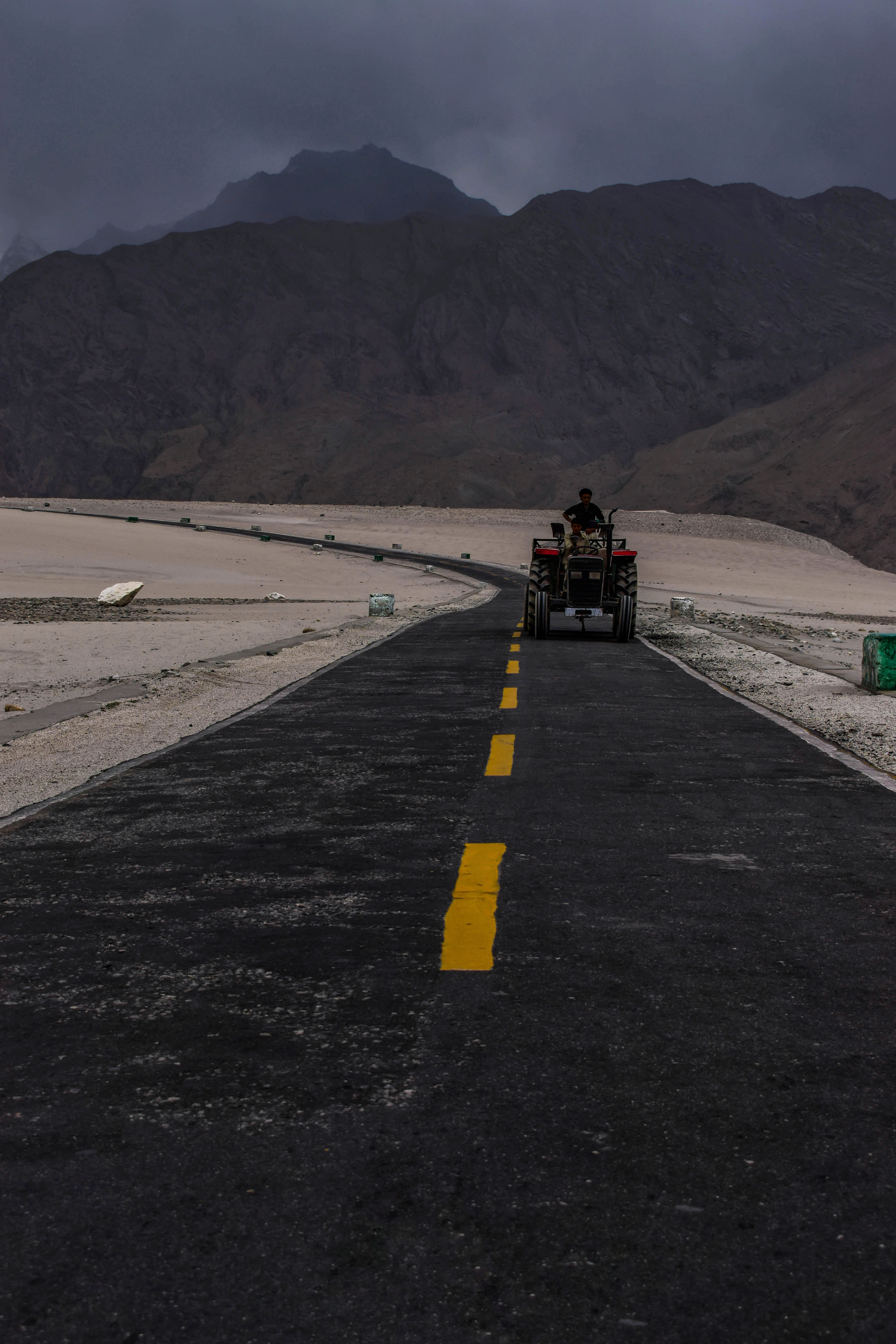
A view of Shigar-Skardu Road passing through Safaranga Desert, 2018

Since 2017, Safaranga Jeep Rally is annually conducted at the desert. The festival also features local music and traditional food. In 2023, the annual festival generated 0.825 million USD in business.

== Climate ==
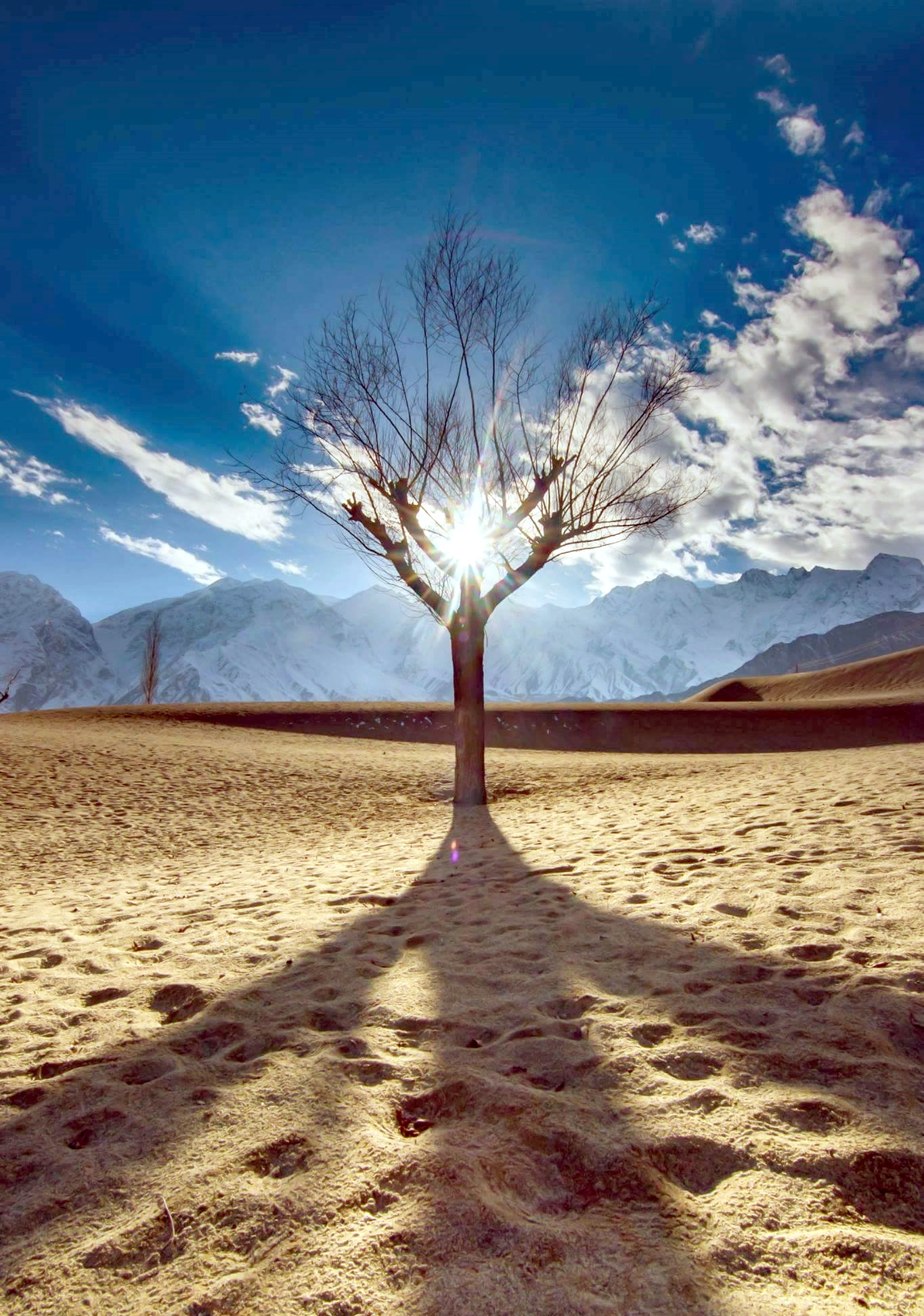
Surrounding Karakoram Range at the desert, 2013

During summer, the weather is mild and dry, but winters are harsh, with temperatures dropping below -25 °C (-13 °F).

== See also ==
- Katpana Desert, separated by Indus River on its left bank
