= Abdul Rahim Yugovi =

Maulana Abdul Rahim Bin Muhammad Ali Yugovi, also known as Bawa Molbi, was a great scholar of Ahle Hadith from Yugo, Baltistan. His father was a famous scholar of that time among the Noorbakhshia of Yugo. Today, people in Baltistan consider him as the first person who propagated and preached Ahle Hadith school of thought among the mainstream. Due to his contributions a lot of people among Norbakhshis of Baltistan converted to Ahle Hadith sect and two villages became predominantly with Ahle Hadith population, with Yugo 100 percent followers of Ahle Hadith.

== Birth and early education ==
Maulana Abdul Rahim Bin Muhammad Ali Yugovi was born in 1860 AD in a religious family. He had two brothers Abdul Karim and Abdul Wahid who died during the lifetime of his father. Maulana Abdul Rahim Bin Muhammad Ali Yugovi got his early education from Akhond Soday Ali Balghari. Then he studied from Sayyeds of Keris, Kharkoh and Shigar ulemas. The books he studied include Quran Majeed, Pand Nama, Karimia, Gulistan, Bostan, Fiqh e Ahwat, Usool-ew-Etiqadiyah and Dawat-e-Sofia. Then he went to India for higher education and got admission in Darul Uloom Deoband and studied there for 23 years. Then he went to Madrasa-e-Naziriyah where he completes his education from Maulana Abdul Salam in 1908 AD (1327h).

== Return to hometown and conversion to Ahlehadith school of thought ==
There were some people before Maulana who accepted Ahlehadith school of thought from Baqir colony including Molvi M.Islam and his brothers Ismail and abul Hassan and Ghulam popularly known as Wahhabi Ghulam. Some people from the town of Maulana had already accepted Ahlehadith, they were Abdul Aziz, Mali, and Soday Ali wh accepted Ahle Hadith while they were working in Delhi and came back to Baqir Colony. There in Baqir Colony they used to offer prayers with their Noorbakhshia brothers, but due to daily skirmish and arguments they decided to build their own mosque. Following their leading imam, all the people of Sirkiting (Baqir Colony) accepted Ahle hadith Sect, and cooperated and coordinated with the three former Ahe Hadith persons. Thus once for all, the people of Baqir Colony converted all together to Ahle Hadith sect.

== Contribution ==
Maulana established a Madrassa in Baqir Colony, where not only students from Yugo but other parts of Baltistan got educated. He used to give what he has food at home to his students. He spent all the wealth he had upon his students.

== Manners and good qualities ==
Maulana Abdul Rahim was a self-respecting, full of courage and self-confident person. Although the Great floods 1918–1930 made people of Yugo Baltistan destitute and poor yet Maulana refused any offer of salary by that time Government of India by saying,"I so all this services for Fisabilillah (God's pleasure)". It show his inner motivation and service for the religion.

== Offspring ==
Maulana had two wives simultaneously, with whom he had five daughters.

== Death ==
Maulana Abdul Rahim died in 1936 AD (1355h).

== See also ==
- Balti people
- Balti language
- Ghanche
- Skardu
- Northern Areas
