= Skardu Valley =

Skardu Valley وادی سکردو
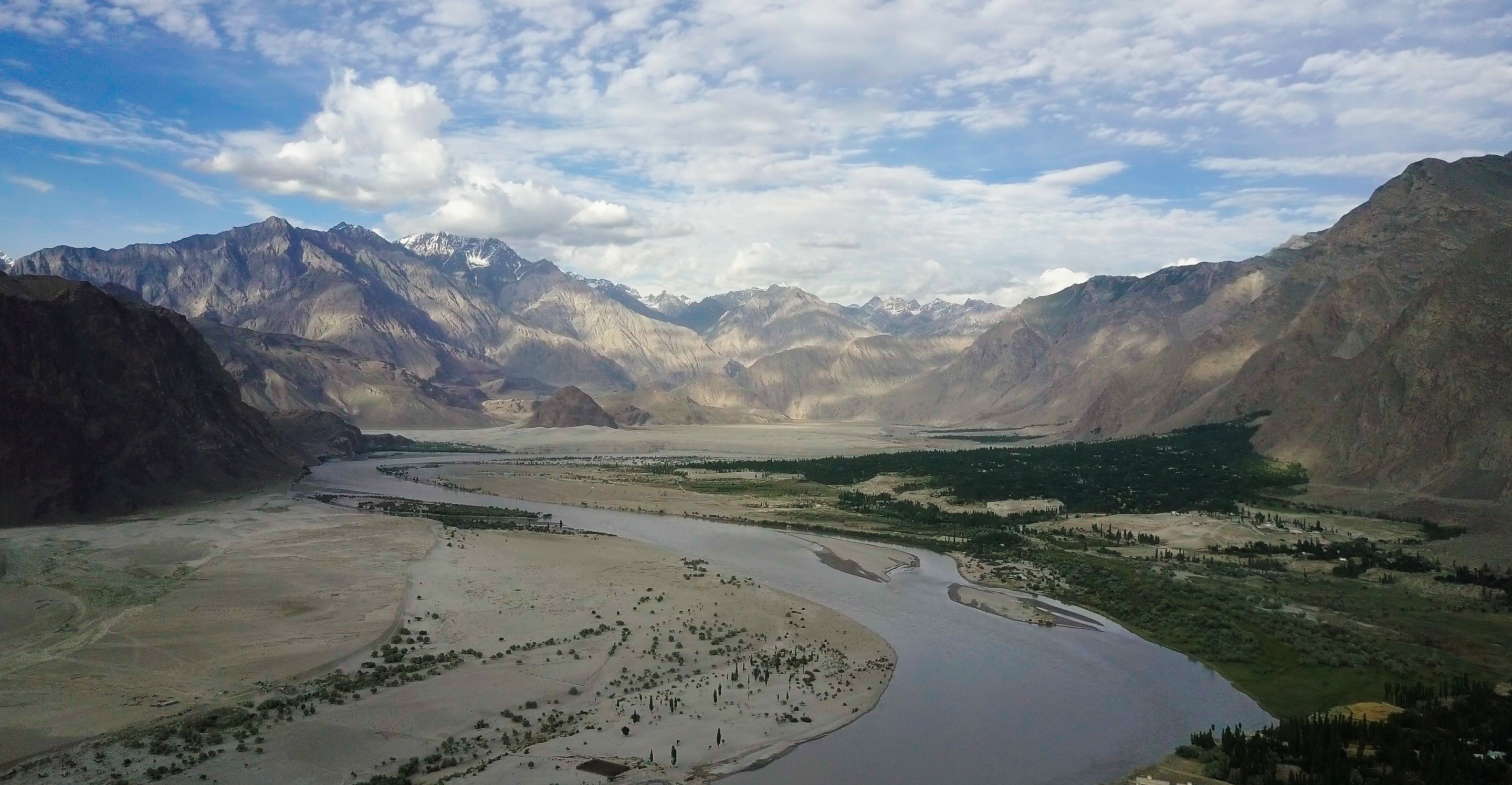
- Skardu Valley, Gilgit Baltistan

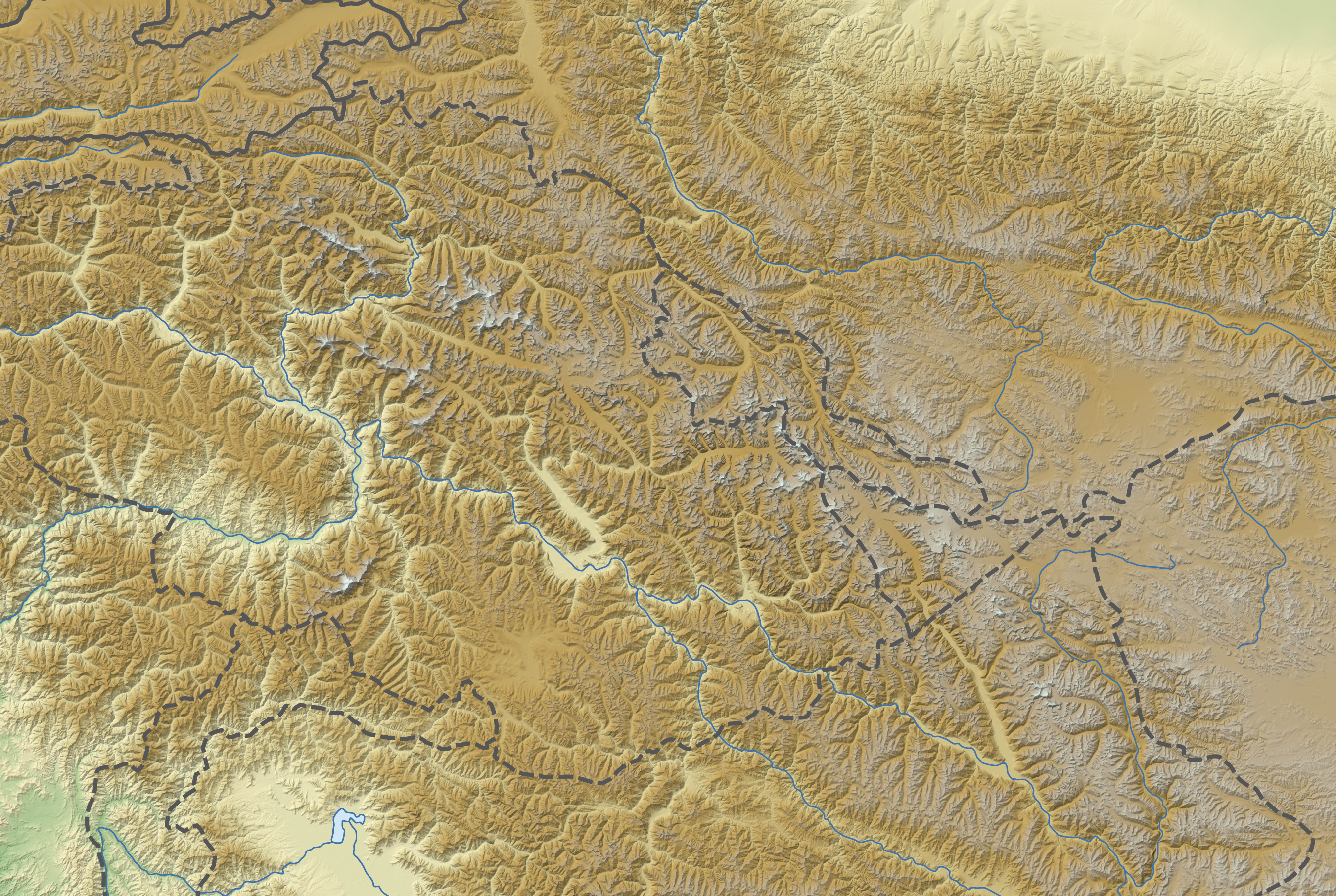
- Skardu Valley on Pakistan Map
- Coordinates: 35°17′25″N 75°38′40″E
- Country: Pakistan
- Province: Gilgit Baltistan
- Time zone: UTC+5 (PST)
  - Summer (DST): UTC+6 (GMT+5)

The Skardu Valley (Urdu: وادئ سکردو) is located in Gilgit-Baltistan region of Pakistan. The valley, about 10 km wide and 40 km long, is located at the confluence of the Shigar River with Indus River where Shigar Valley opens into Skardu Valley.

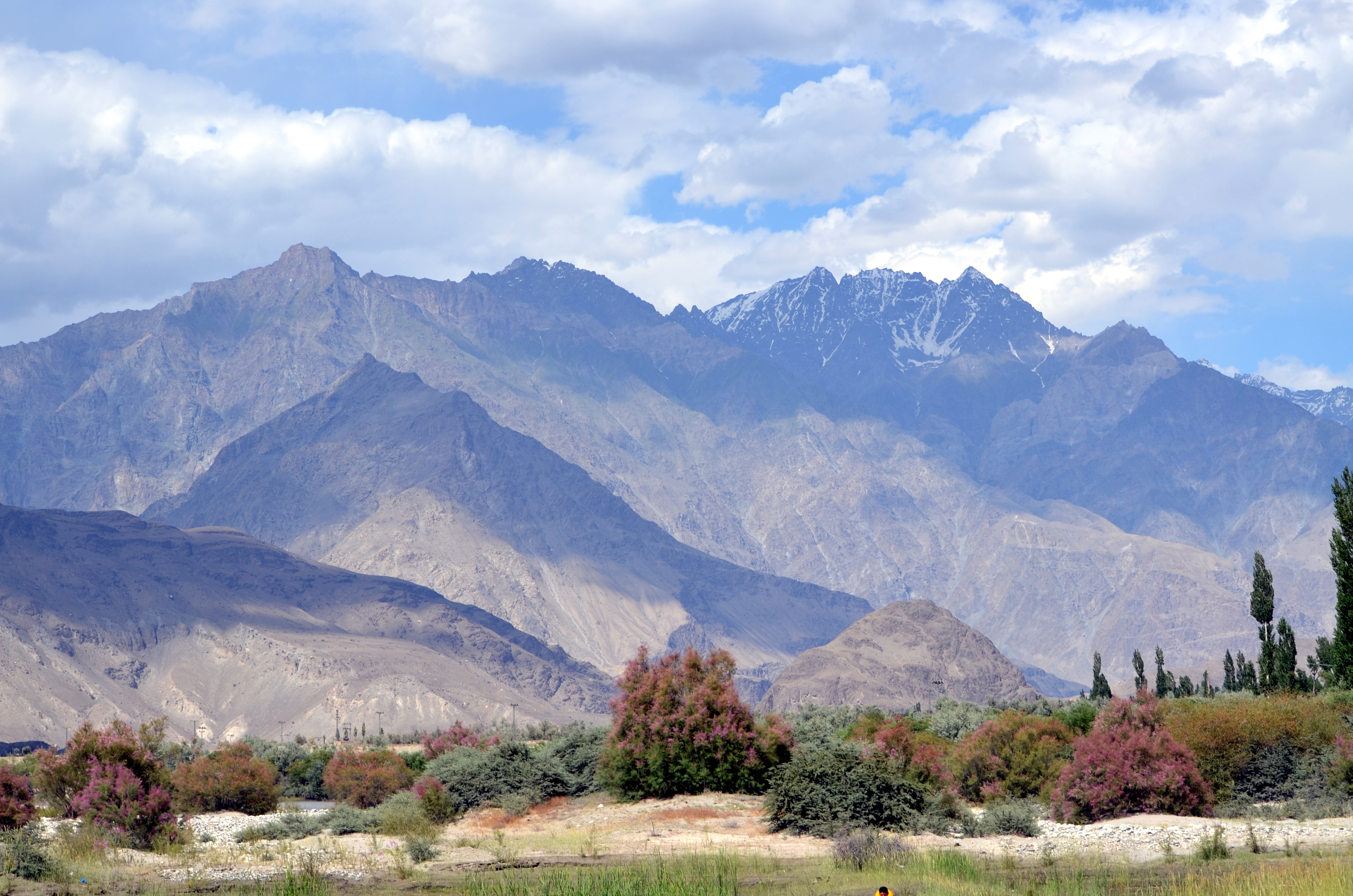
A view of Karakoram mountains from Skardu Valley

It is surrounded by the Karakoram and Himalayas ranges, with elevation of surrounding peaks rising upto 4,500 m to 5,000 m. Upstream from Skardu Basin are located Baltoro Glacier, Biafo Glacier, the K2 Base Camp and Concordia. Skardu by road lies approximately 5 hours away from Gilgit and 10 hours drive from Besham.

== See also ==
- Hunza Valley
- Gilgit Valley
- Katpana Desert
- Sarfaranga Desert
