= Katpana Desert =

High-altitude desert in Gilgit-Baltistan, Pakistan

- Cold Desert
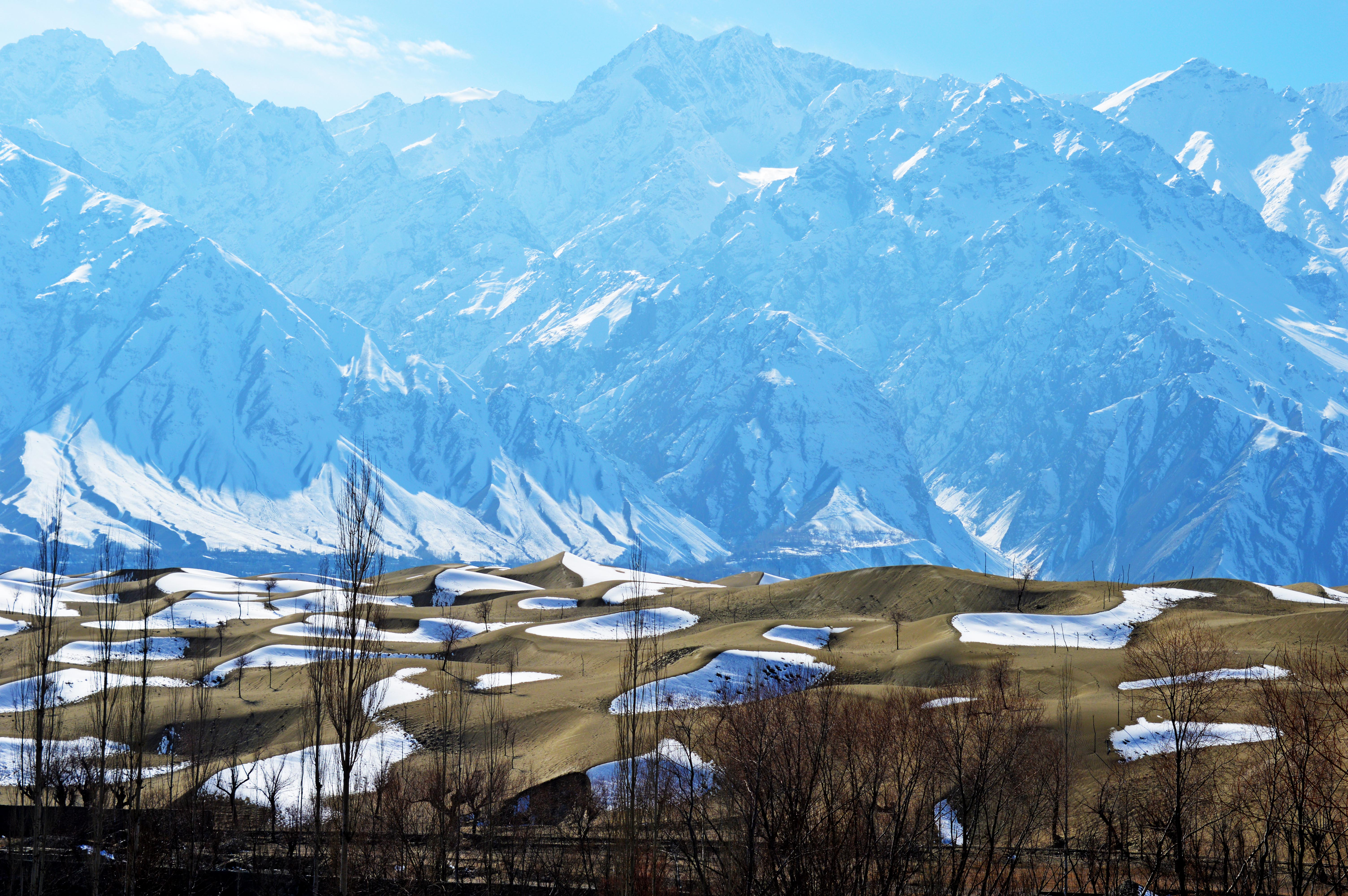
- February 2016 photograph of the high-altitude desert, where sand dunes are seasonally covered in snow

- Location within Pakistan
- Floor elevation: 2,226 m (7,303 ft)

Geography
- Country: Pakistan
- Adm. Unit: Gilgit-Baltistan
- District: Skardu District
- Population center: Skardu
- Coordinates: 35.310522°N 75.590747°E
- Interactive map of Katpana Desert

The Katpana Desert, also known as Biang-a Naqpo, Katpana Biang-a or Skardu Cold Desert, is a high-altitude desert located in Skardu Valley in Skardu District, Gilgit-Baltistan, Pakistan.

Situated at an elevation of 2,226 m (7,303 ft) above sea level, the Katpana Desert is one of the highest deserts in the world. The desert consists of large sand dunes that are covered in snow during the winter. While the desert technically stretches from the banks of Indus River in the south of Skardu to New Ranga Village in the north, the portion of the desert that is most frequented by tourists is located near Katpana Lake close to Skardu International Airport.

== Climate ==
Temperatures range from a maximum of 27 °C (81 °F) and a minimum (in October) of 8 °C (46 °F), which can drop further to below −17 °C (1 °F) in December and January. The temperature occasionally drops as low as −25 °C (−13 °F).

== Gallery ==
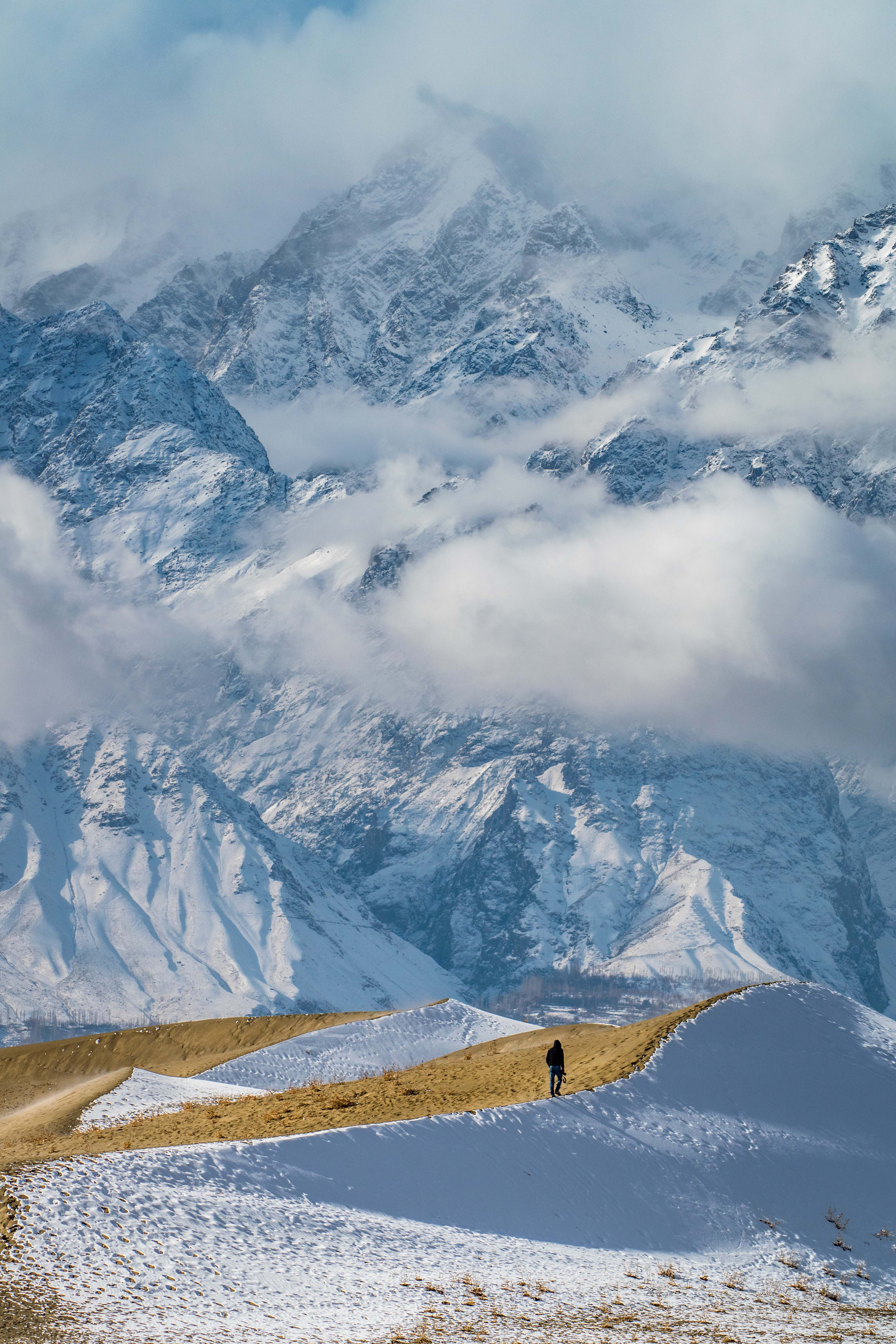

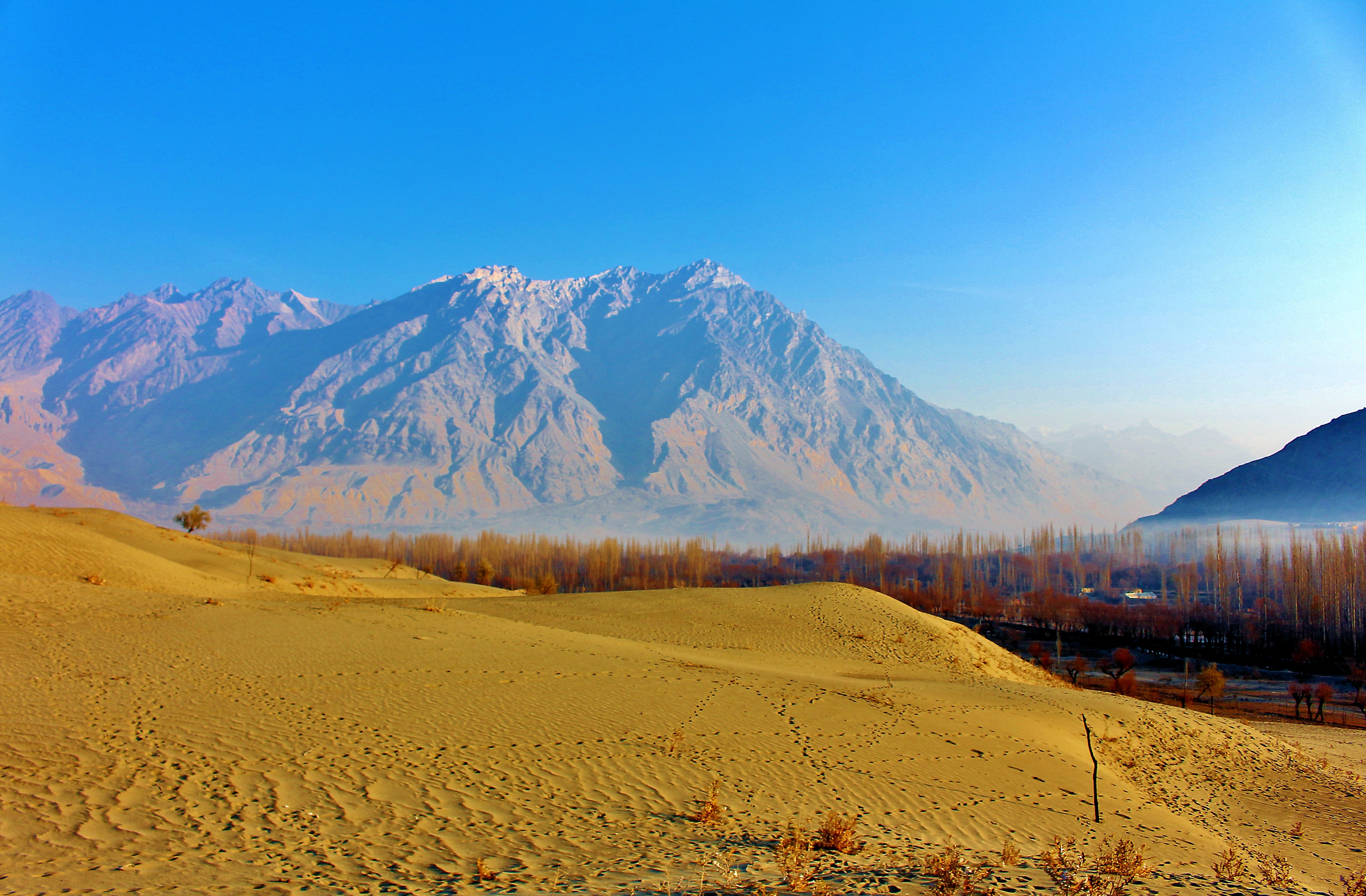

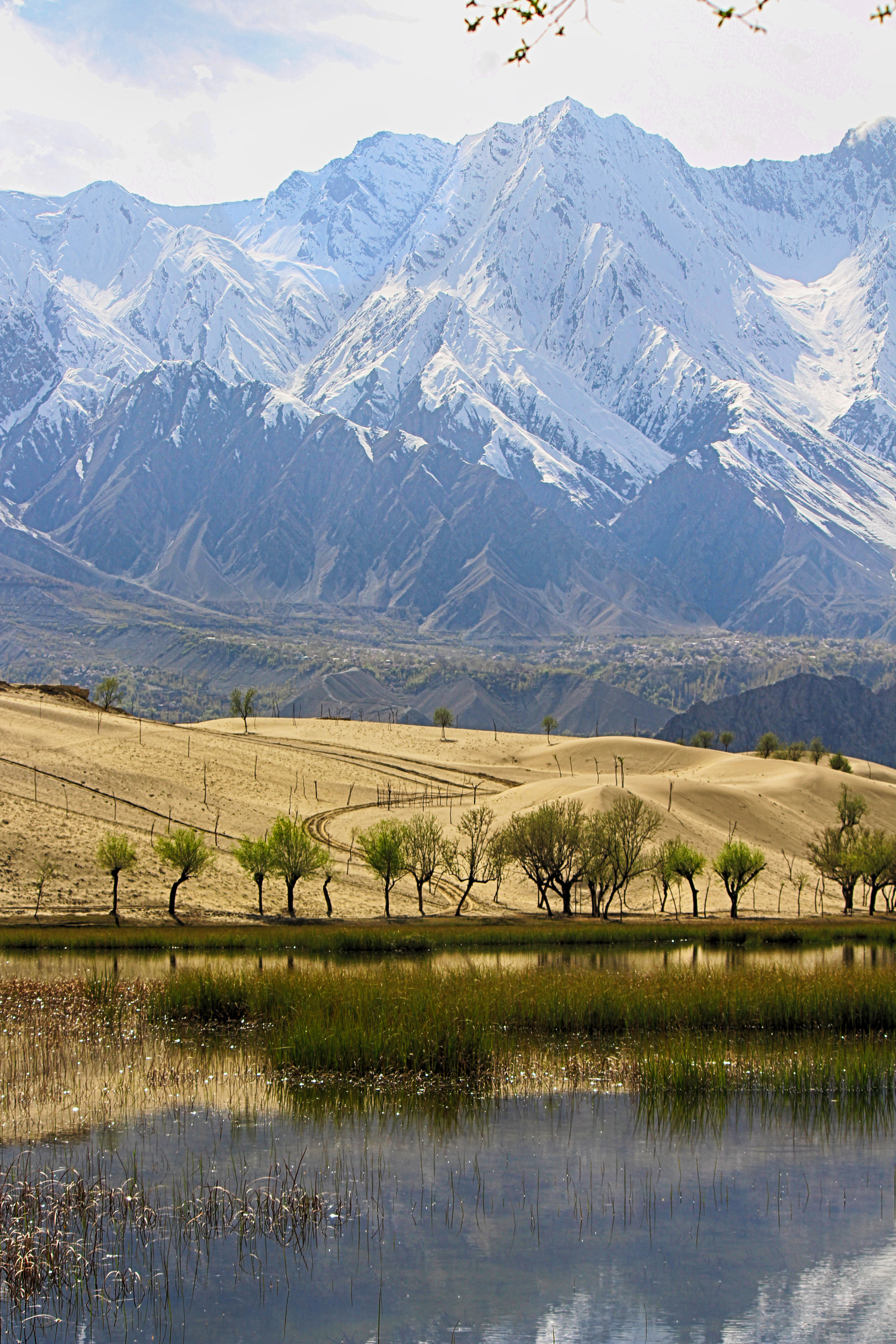
Sand dunes of Katpana

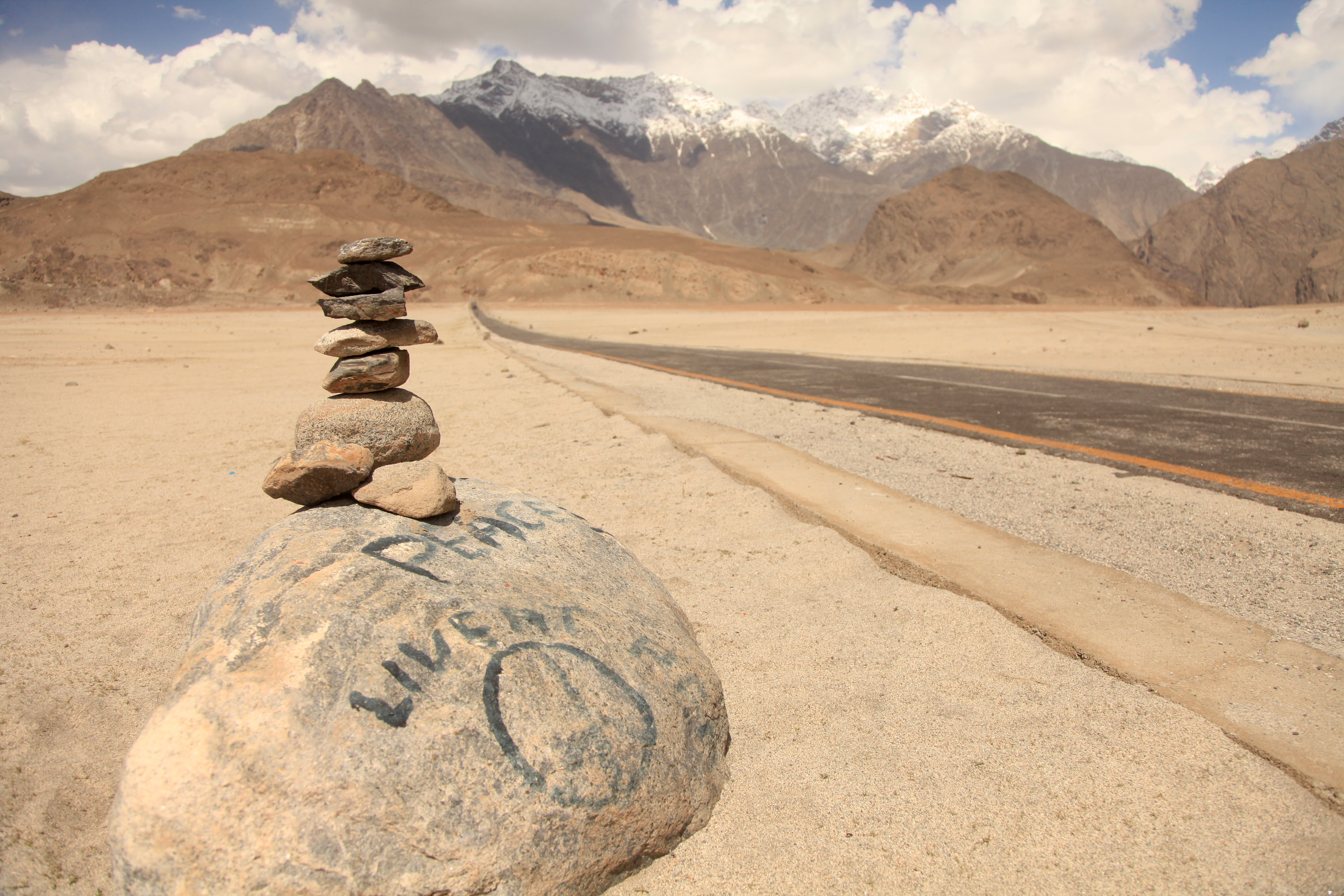
Sand expanse of Katpana

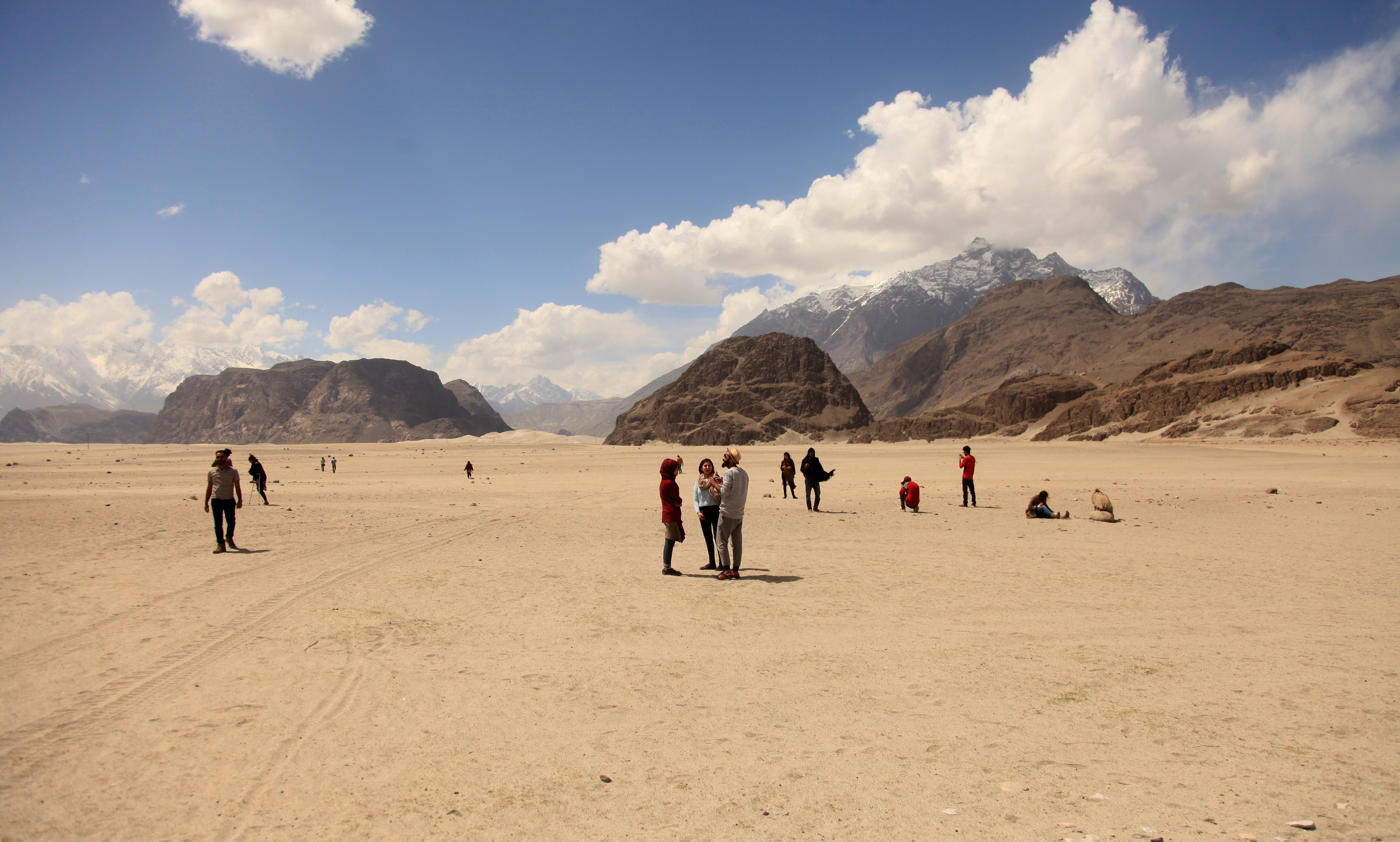

== See also ==
- Sarfaranga Desert
