= Shigar District =

Shigar District ضلع شِگر
- District of Gilgit-Baltistan administered by Pakistan
- Interactive map of Shigar district
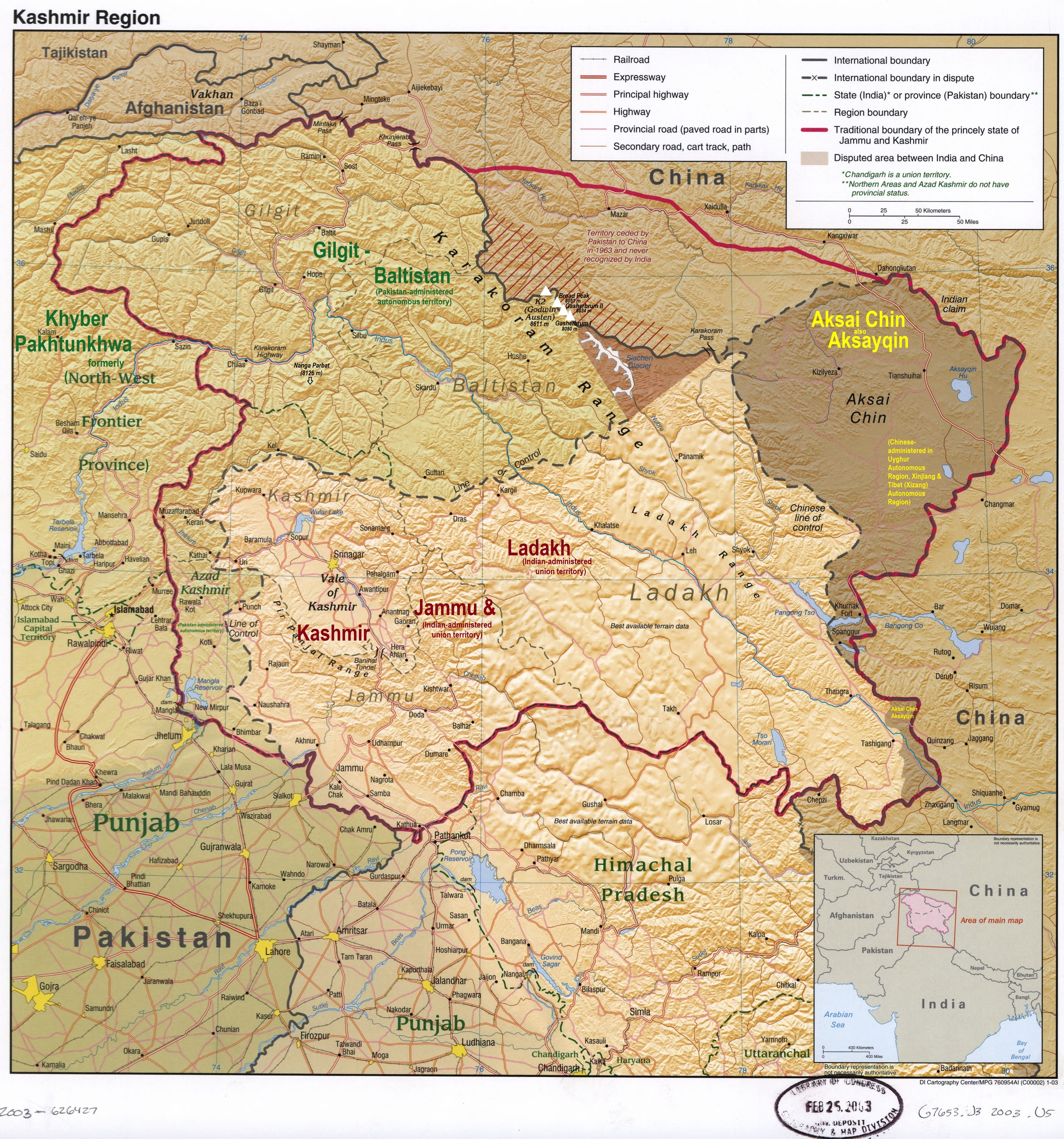
- A map showing Pakistani-administered Gilgit-Baltistan (shaded in sage green) in the disputed Kashmir region
- Coordinates: 35°10′0″N 76°20′0″E
- Country: Pakistan
- Territory: Gilgit-Baltistan
- Division: Baltistan Division
- Headquarters: Shigar

Government
  - Type: District Administration

Area
  - Total: 4,173 km^{2} (1,611 sq mi)

Population (2023)
  - Total: 84,608
  - Density: 20.28/km^{2} (52.51/sq mi)
- Number of tehsils: 1

Shigar District (Urdu: ضلع شِگر) is a district in Gilgit-Baltistan area of Pakistan in the disputed Kashmir region.

== Geography ==
It is home to the world's second highest peak, K2, also known as Chhogori and Mount Godwin-Austen. The district is bounded on the north by the Nagar District, the Hunza District, and the Kashgar Prefecture of China's Xinjiang Uyghur Autonomous Region, on the south-east by the Ghanche District, on the south-west by the Skardu District, and on the west by the Gilgit District.

Map of Gilgit–Baltistan with the Shigar District highlighted in red

The headquarters of the Shigar District is the town of Shigar, which is 30 kilometres (19 mi) from the city of Skardu. Less than 7% of the district consists of alpine pastures, with over 90% of remaining area being permanently snow covered.

== Background ==
The Shigar District is centred around Shigar Valley. Historically ruled by Amacha dynasty, a branch of Trakhān dynasty of Gilgit, Shigar was conquered by Dogras in 1840. In the princely state of Jammu and Kashmir, established under British suzerainty in 1846, Shigar was a part of Skardu tehsil of Ladakh Wazarat. Following 1947 Gilgit Rebellion it along with rest of Baltistan became part of Pakistan. It remained a subdivision of Skardu District until 2015, when it was granted district status.
