= Shigar =

Town in Gilgit–Baltistan, Pakistan

Shigar شگر (Balti ཤི༌གར།)
- Town
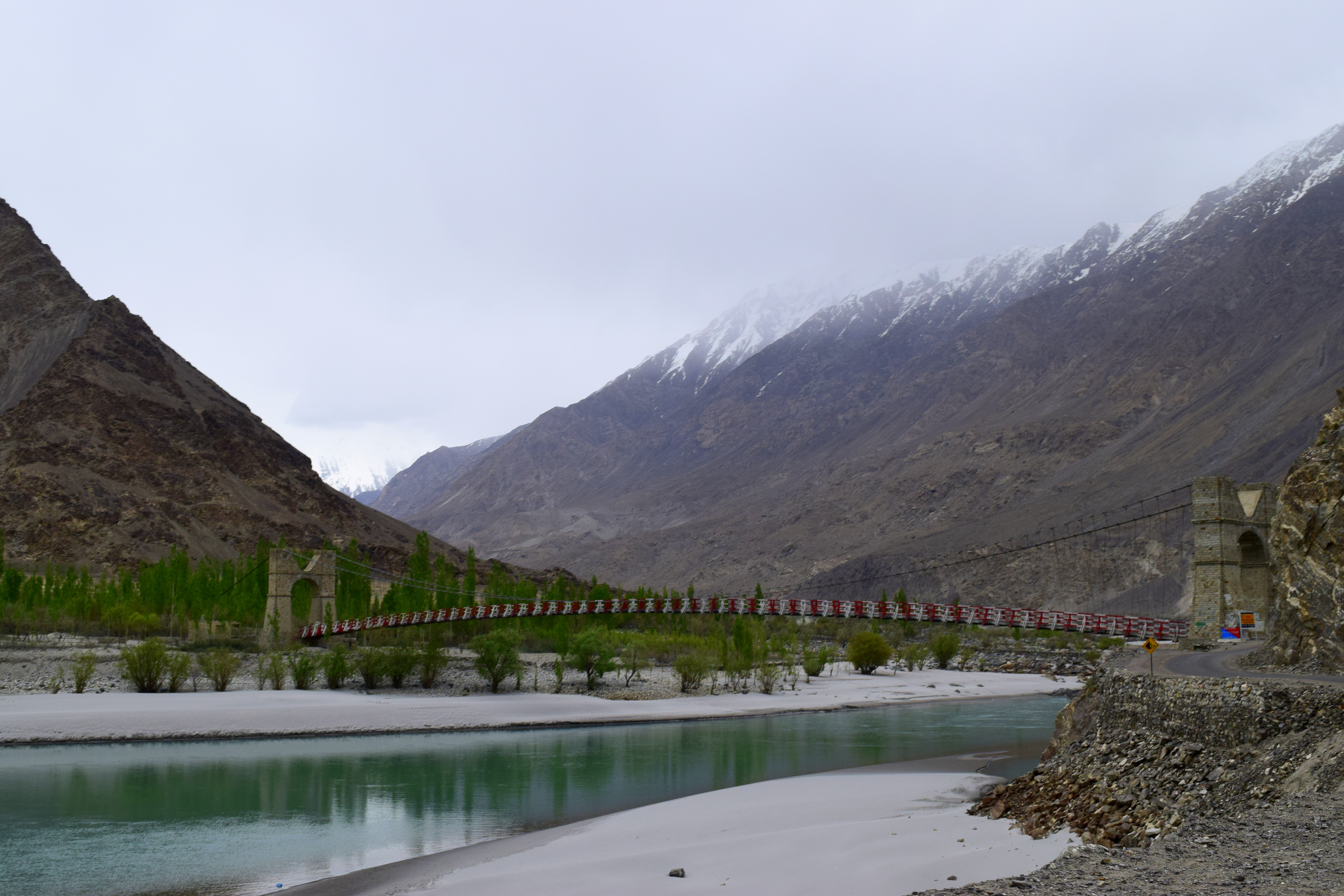
- Shigar, Gilgit Baltistan, Pakistan

- Location in the Karakoram region Shigar (Pakistan)
- Coordinates: 35°25′25″N 75°44′20″E
- Province: Gilgit–Baltistan
- District: Shigar
- Elevation: 2,230 m (7,320 ft)
- Time zone: UTC+5:00 (PST)

Shigar (Urdu: شگر) is the headquarters of Shigar District and tehsil in the Baltistan division of Gilgit-Baltistan region in northern Pakistan. It is located on the bank of the Shigar River in the most remote part of the region. It is a popular site for tourists and trekkers and contains many historical buildings of architectural significance associated with several different communities.

The town is inhabited almost exclusively by the Balti people of Tibetan descent. Almost 65% of the population belongs to the Shia sect of Islam, 26% to the Norbakhshi sect and the remaining to the Sunni sect. Via the Shigar Valley, it is the gateway to the Karakoram mountain range, which has five eight-thousanders, including K2.

== History ==
The local ruling dynasty of Shigar prior to the Dogra conquest was known as Amāchas, who traced their descent from the Ayash dyansty of Hunza and like them used the title of Tham. The principal source of information regarding the Amāchas is the Shigarnamah, written in 1752 CE. Ahmad Hasan Dani derives the etymology of Amācha from the Sanskrit amātya, meaning minister. The founder of the dynasty was one Cha Tham, a Hunza prince. According to tradition, Syed Ali Hamdani arrived in Shigar in the late 14th century and converted the locals to Islam. To this day, mosques and khanqahs attributed to him exist in the region. Mir Shams-ud-Din Araqi (d. 1525) came to Shigar during the reign of Amācha ruler Ghāzitham II. During the reign of Abdullah Khan, Shigar was invaded in 1532 by the Sultan Said Khan, the ruler of Yarkent Khanate. Shigar was conquered in 1634 by Abdal Khan, the ruler of Skardu, but Amāchas regained power with the help of Mughal forces. The last ruler of Shigar was Haidar Khan during whose rule Baltistan was conquered by Zorawar Singh, in 1842.

== Tourist attractions ==
Popular tourist attractions in the town include:

- Shigar Fort
- Amburik Mosque
- Khanqah-e-Muallah Shigar

== Climate ==
Shigar has a cold desert climate (Köppen: BWk).

Climate data for Shigar, elevation: 2,289 m (7,510 ft), 1982–2012 normals
Month	Jan	Feb	Mar	Apr	May	Jun	Jul	Aug	Sep	Oct	Nov	Dec	Year
Mean daily maximum °C (°F)	−0.4 (31.3)	2.2 (36.0)	8.9 (48.0)	16.2 (61.2)	21.8 (71.2)	26.8 (80.2)	30.3 (86.5)	30.0 (86.0)	25.0 (77.0)	18.4 (65.1)	10.9 (51.6)	3.5 (38.3)	16.1 (61.0)
Daily mean °C (°F)	−5.2 (22.6)	−3.0 (26.6)	3.9 (39.0)	10.6 (51.1)	15.4 (59.7)	19.9 (67.8)	23.4 (74.1)	23.0 (73.4)	18.1 (64.6)	11.4 (52.5)	4.3 (39.7)	−1.6 (29.1)	10.0 (50.0)
Mean daily minimum °C (°F)	−9.9 (14.2)	−8.1 (17.4)	−1.0 (30.2)	5.0 (41.0)	9.1 (48.4)	13.0 (55.4)	16.5 (61.7)	16.1 (61.0)	11.3 (52.3)	4.4 (39.9)	−2.2 (28.0)	−6.6 (20.1)	4.0 (39.1)
Average precipitation mm (inches)	18 (0.7)	17 (0.7)	29 (1.1)	22 (0.9)	23 (0.9)	6 (0.2)	7 (0.3)	8 (0.3)	9 (0.4)	5 (0.2)	3 (0.1)	12 (0.5)	159 (6.3)
Source: Climate-Data.org

== Gallery ==
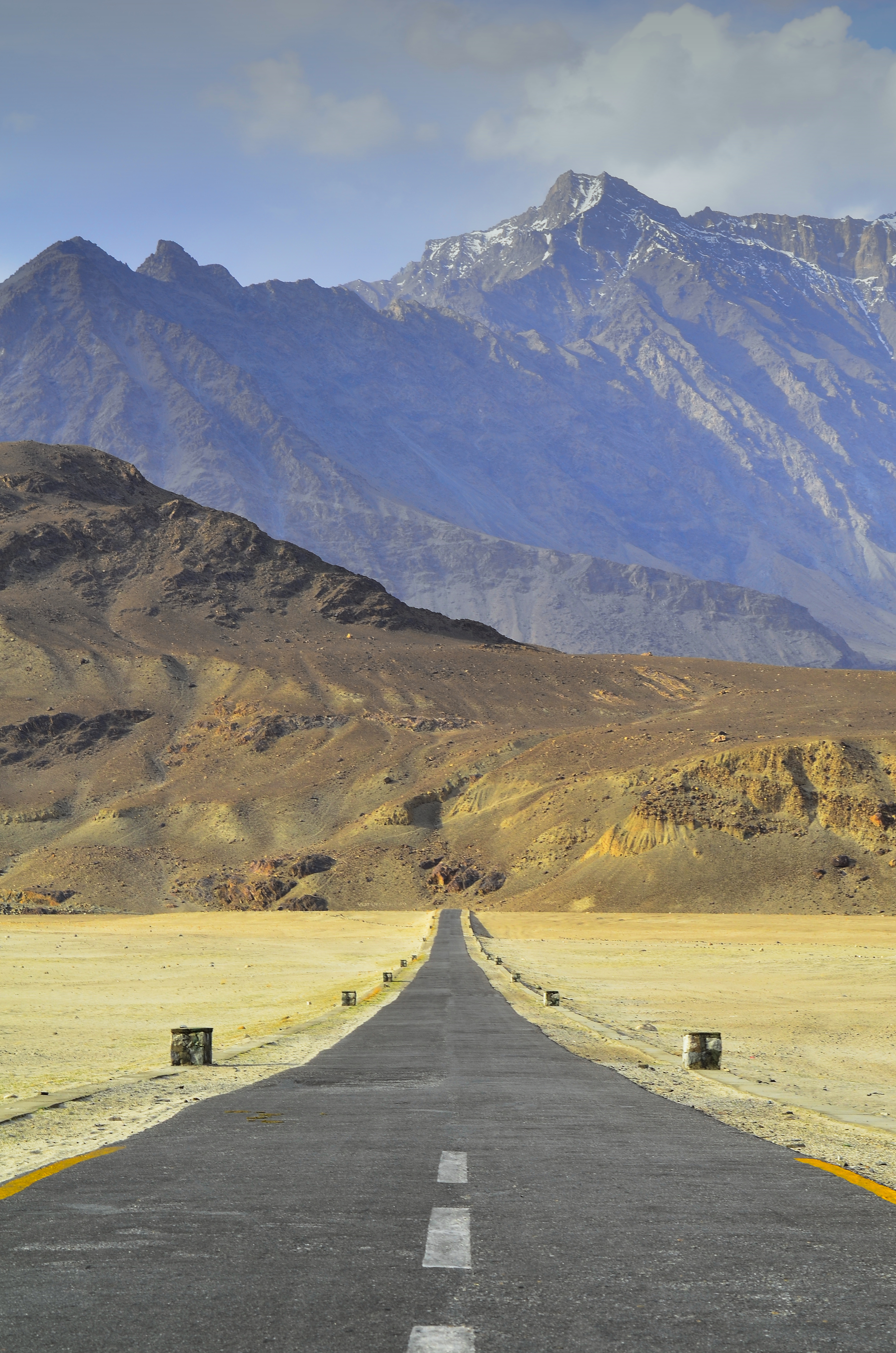
All roads out of Shigar, such as the one to Skardu pictured here, pass through rugged mountainous terrain.

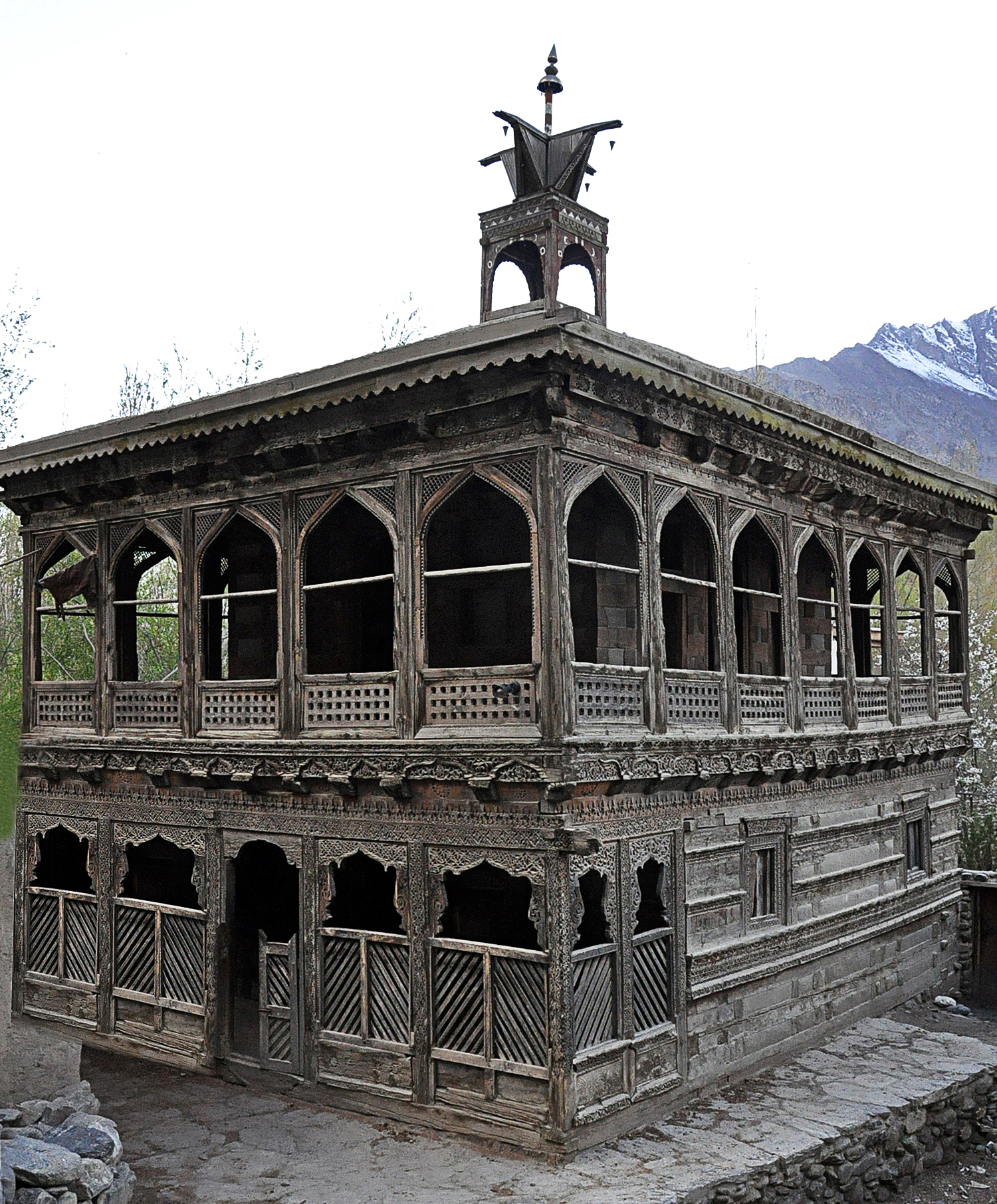
Khilingrong Mosque at Shigar

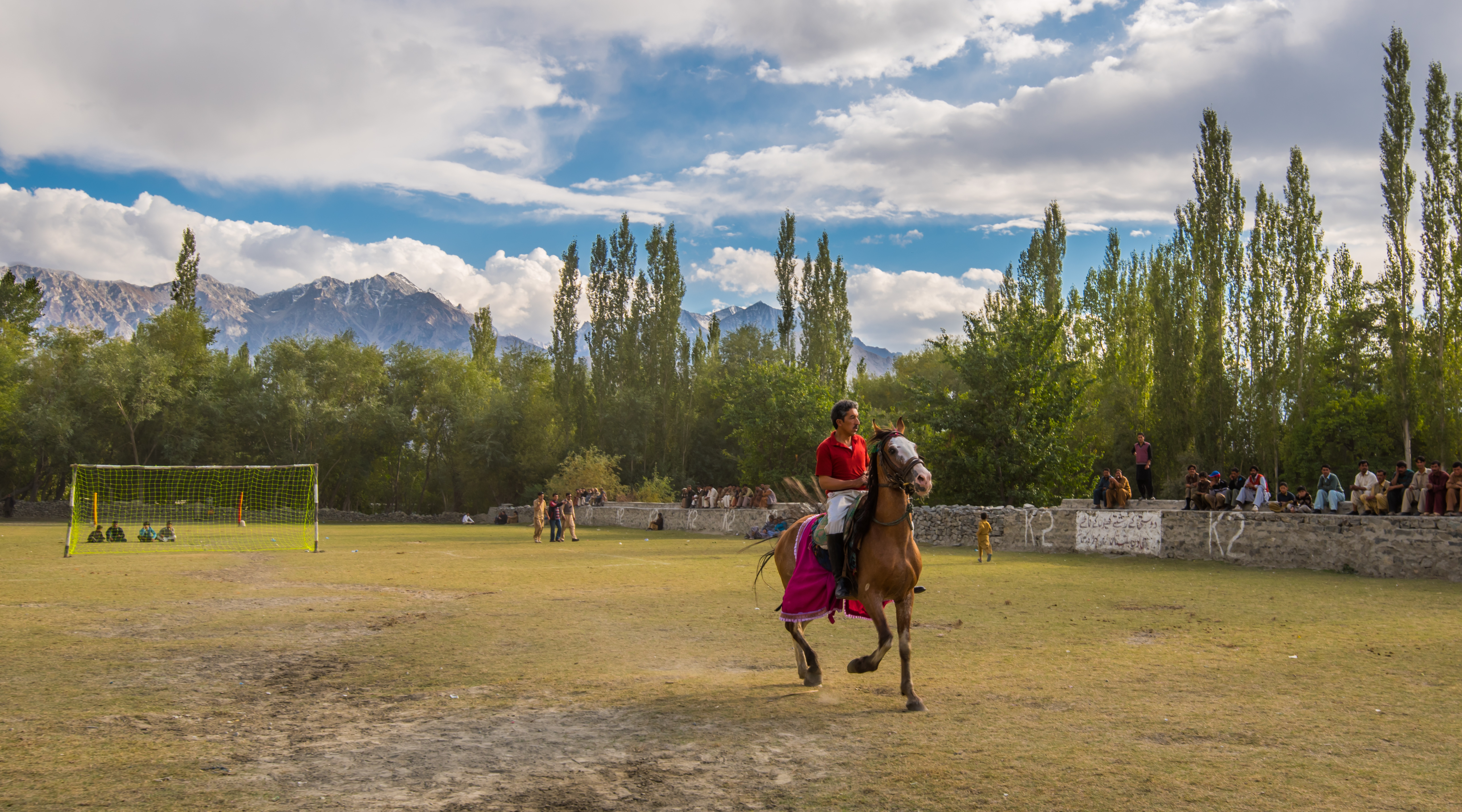
Polo is enjoyed by local Pakistanis in Shigar.

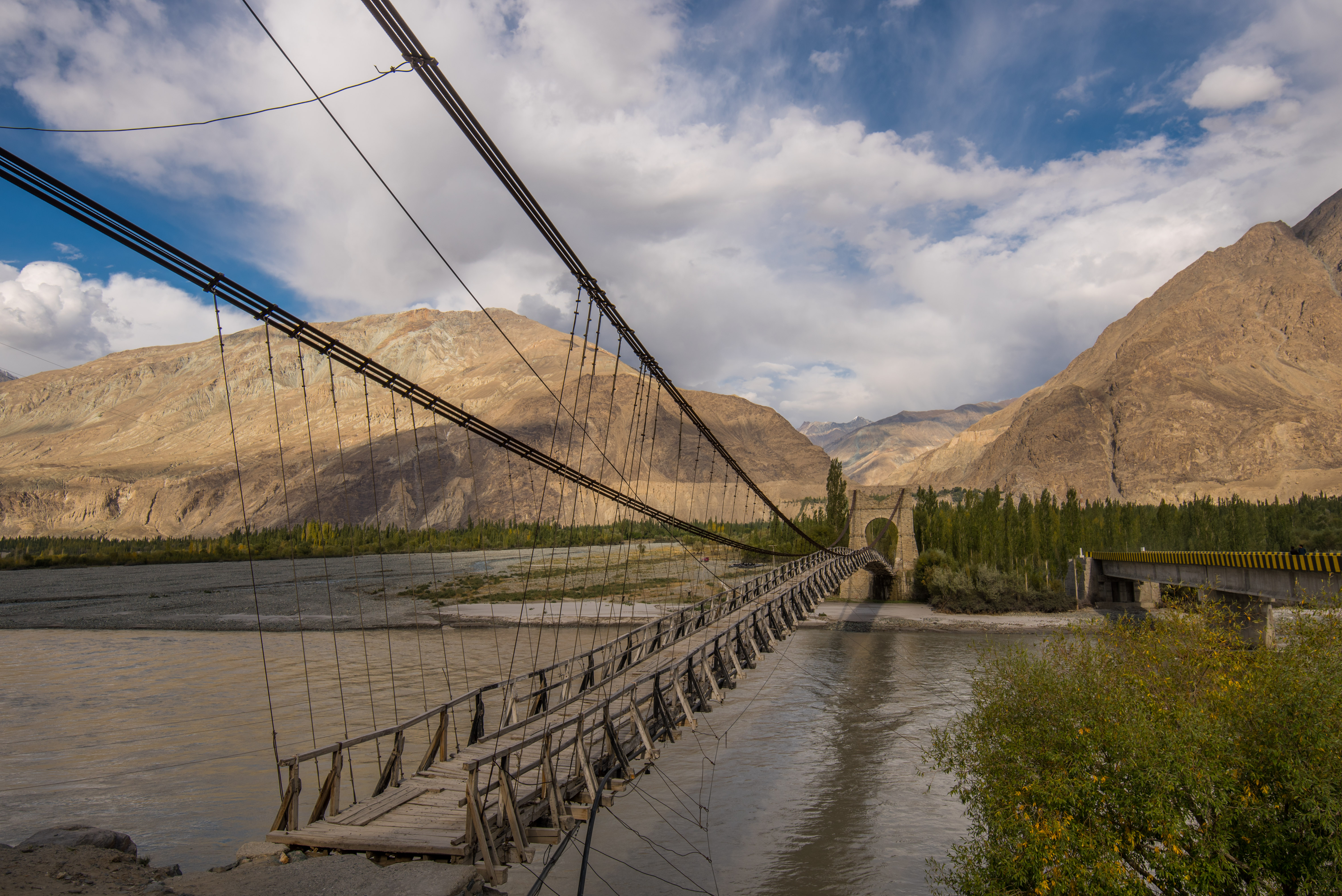
Gulabpur Bridge

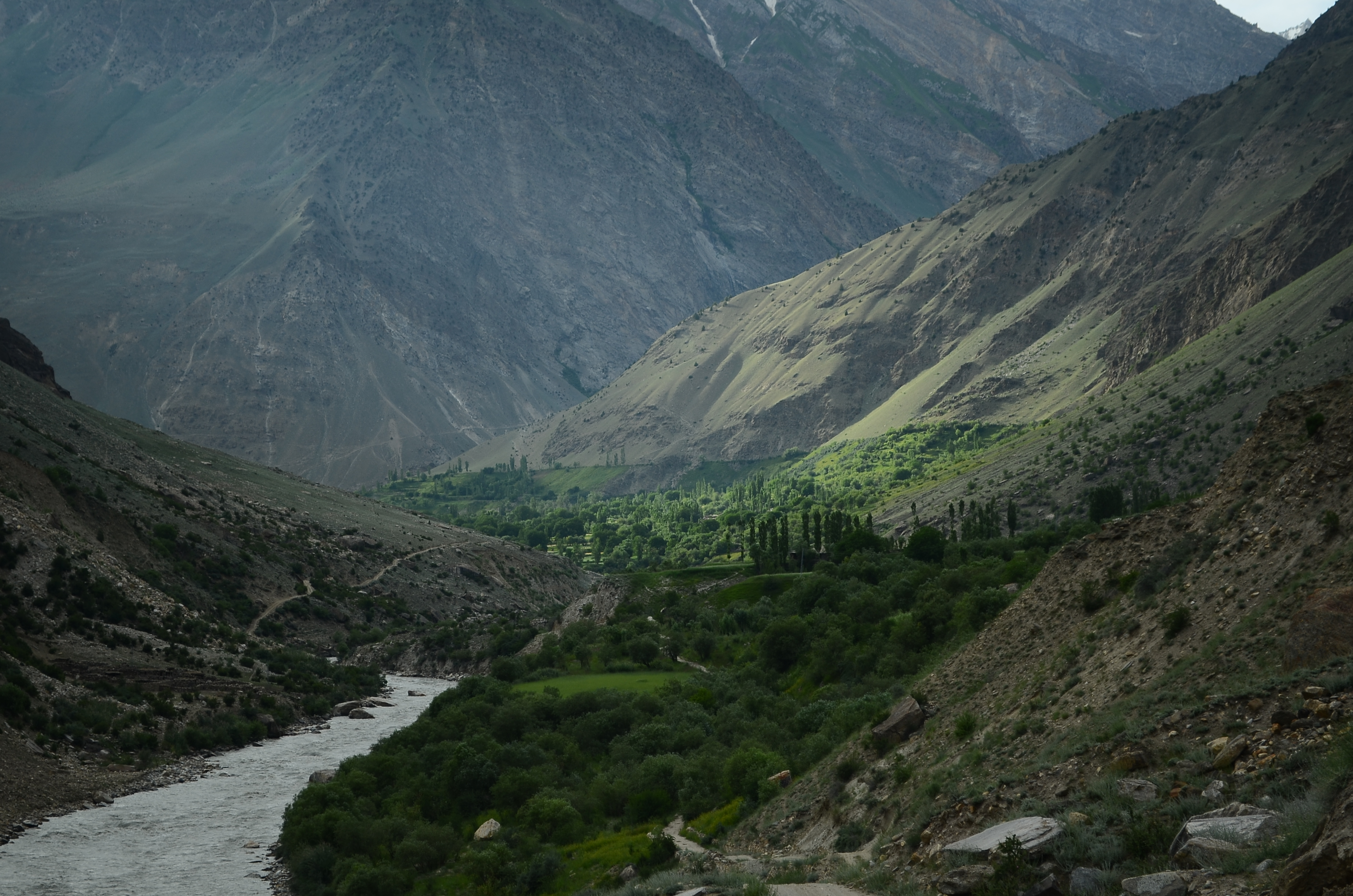
Bisil sunset, Bhasha Valley, Shigar

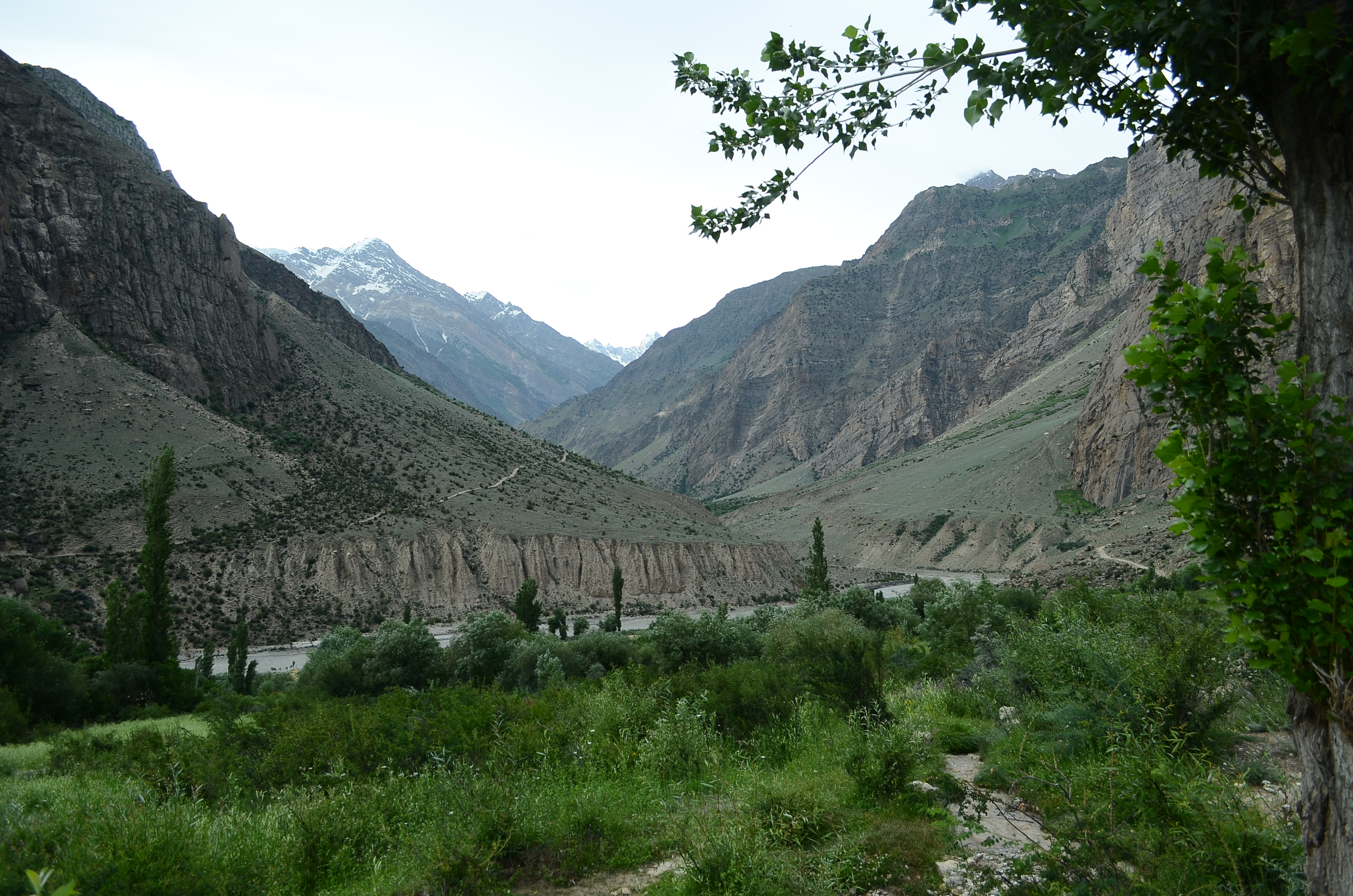
Bisil, Bhasha Valley, Shigar

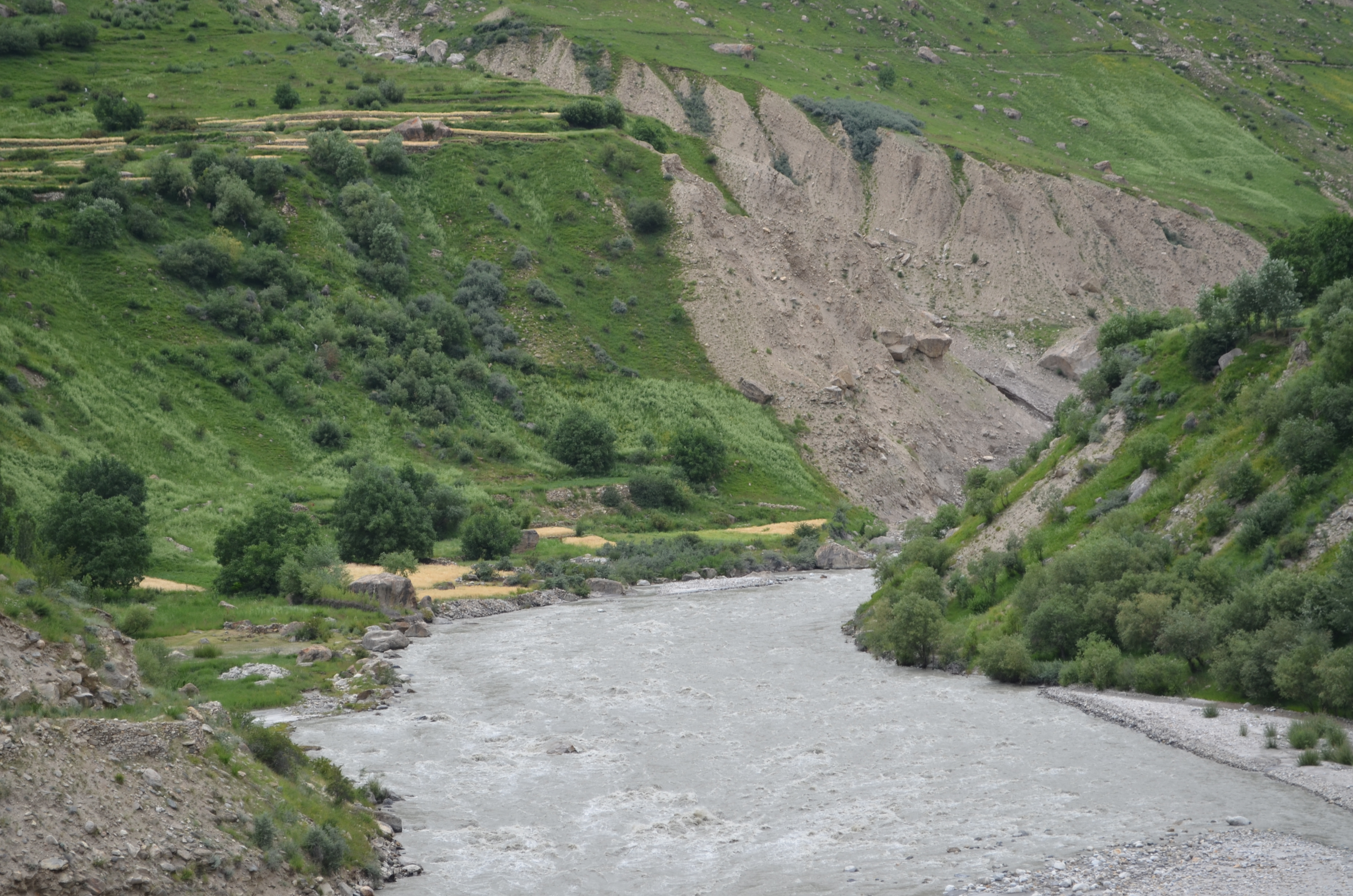
Shigar river, Zil Shigar

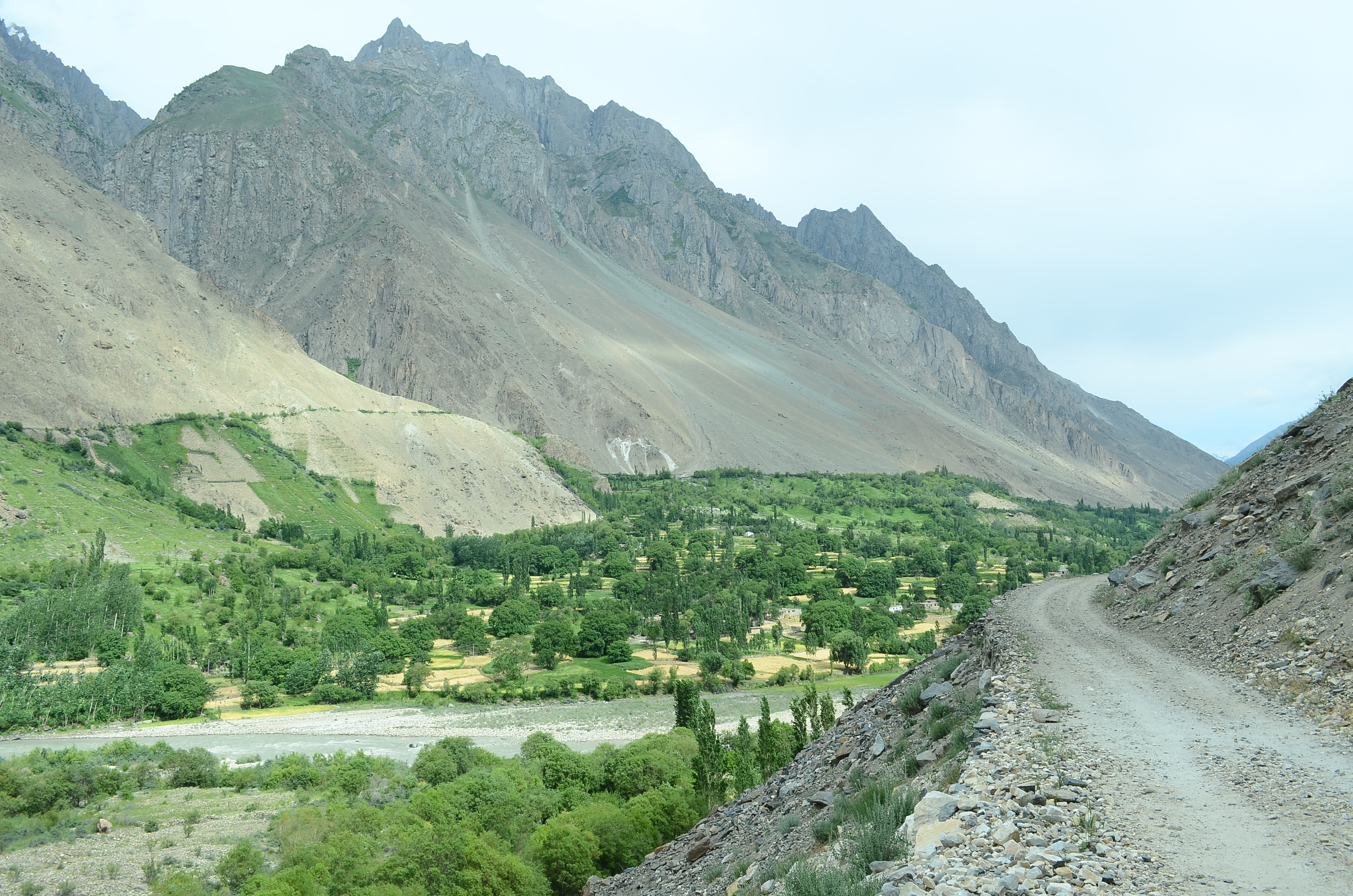
Shigar Bhasha Valley road

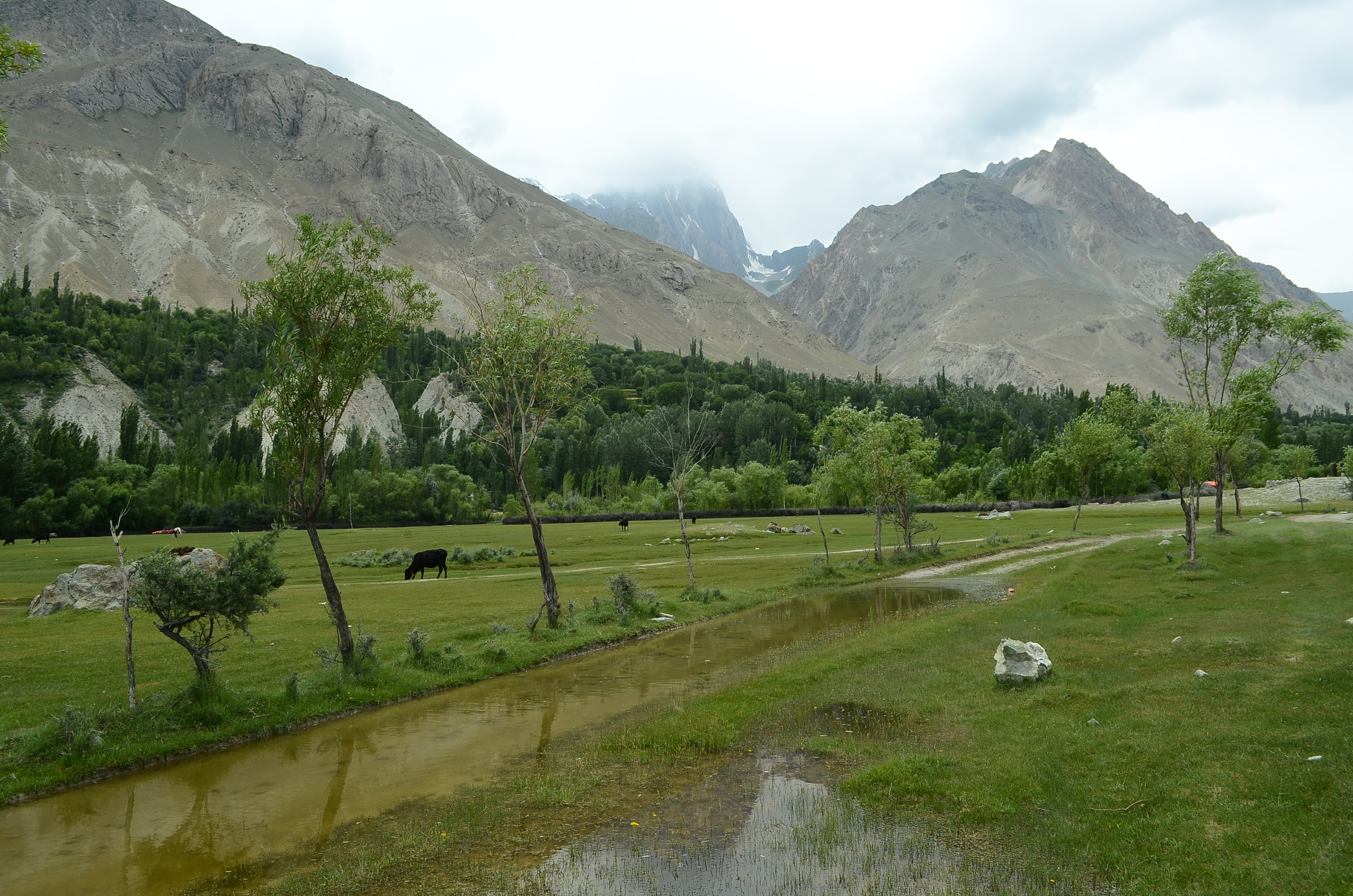
Tisar village, Shigar Valley

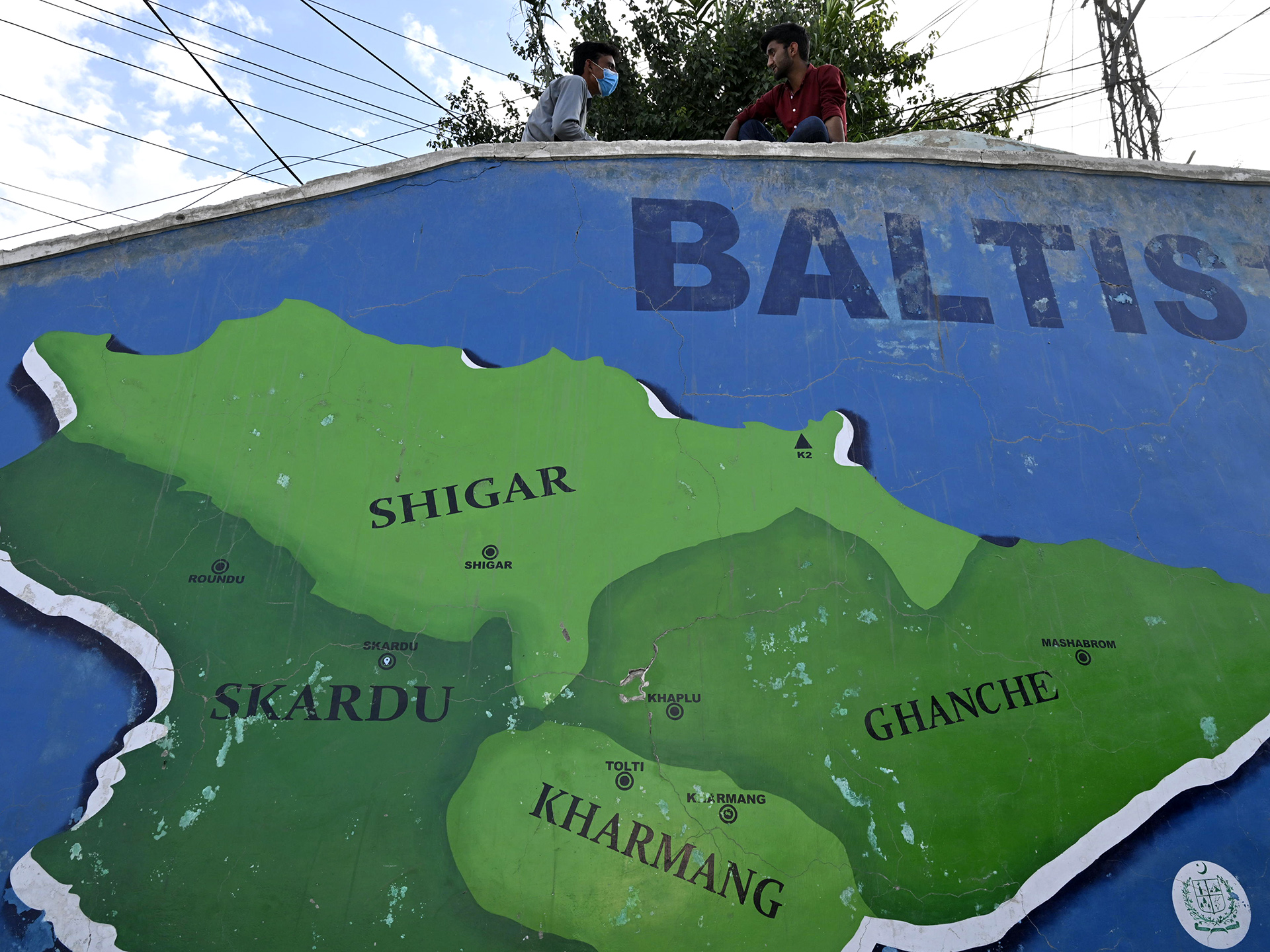
A mural map of Shigar painted on a wall in the city of Skardu, the capital of Gilgit-Baltistan, Pakistan.

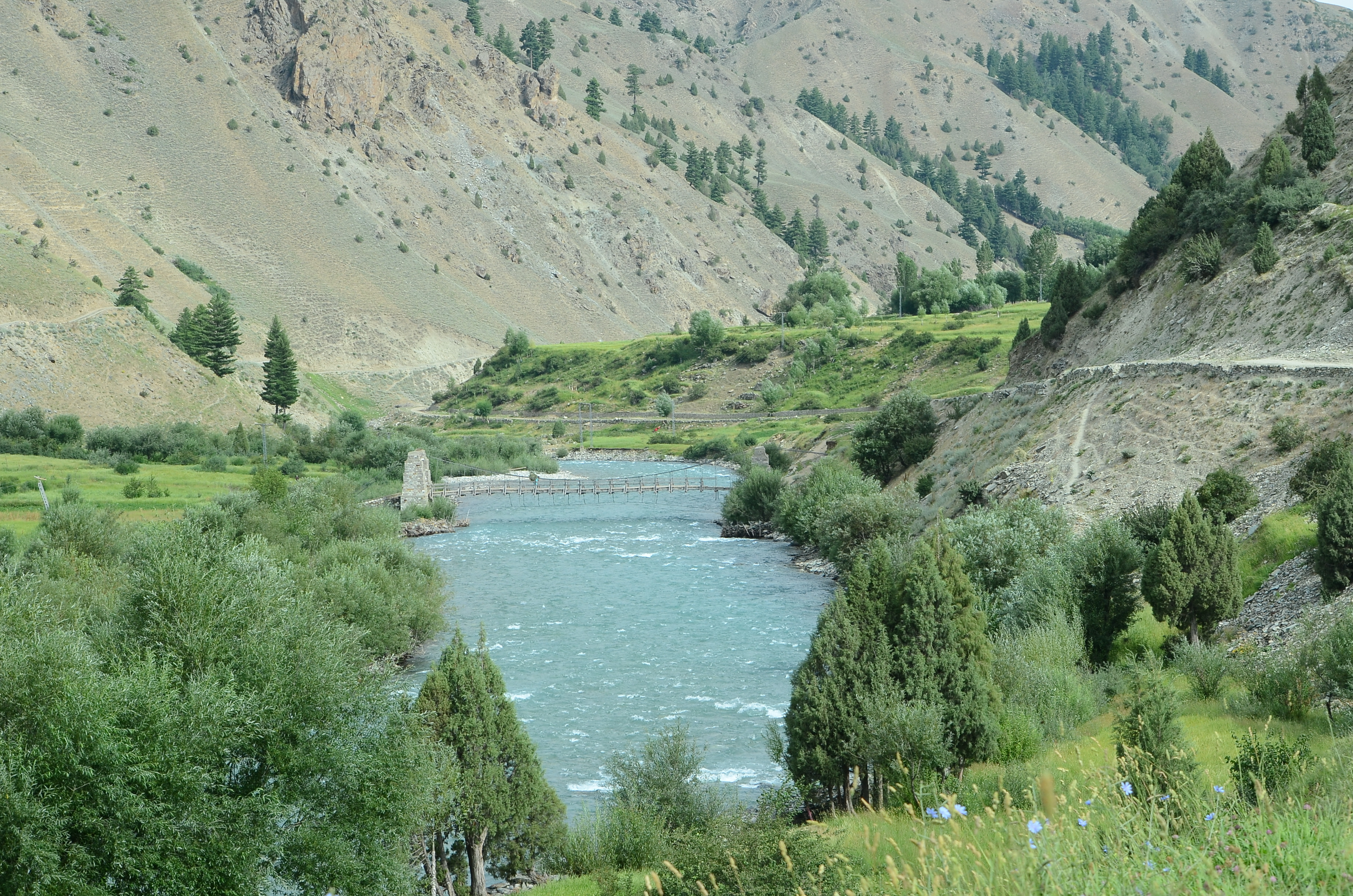
Doko bridge in Shigar

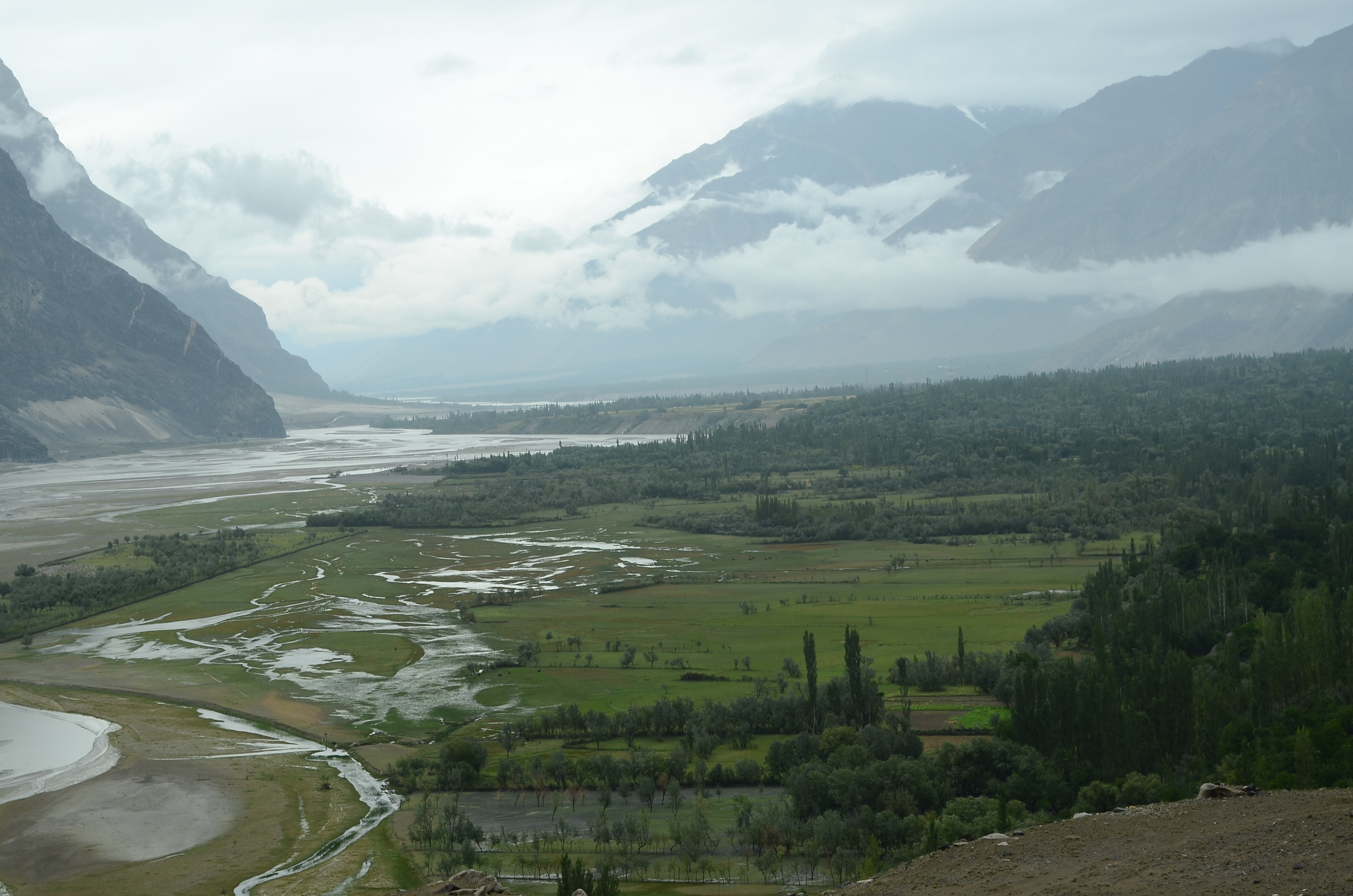
Clouds over Shigar Valley

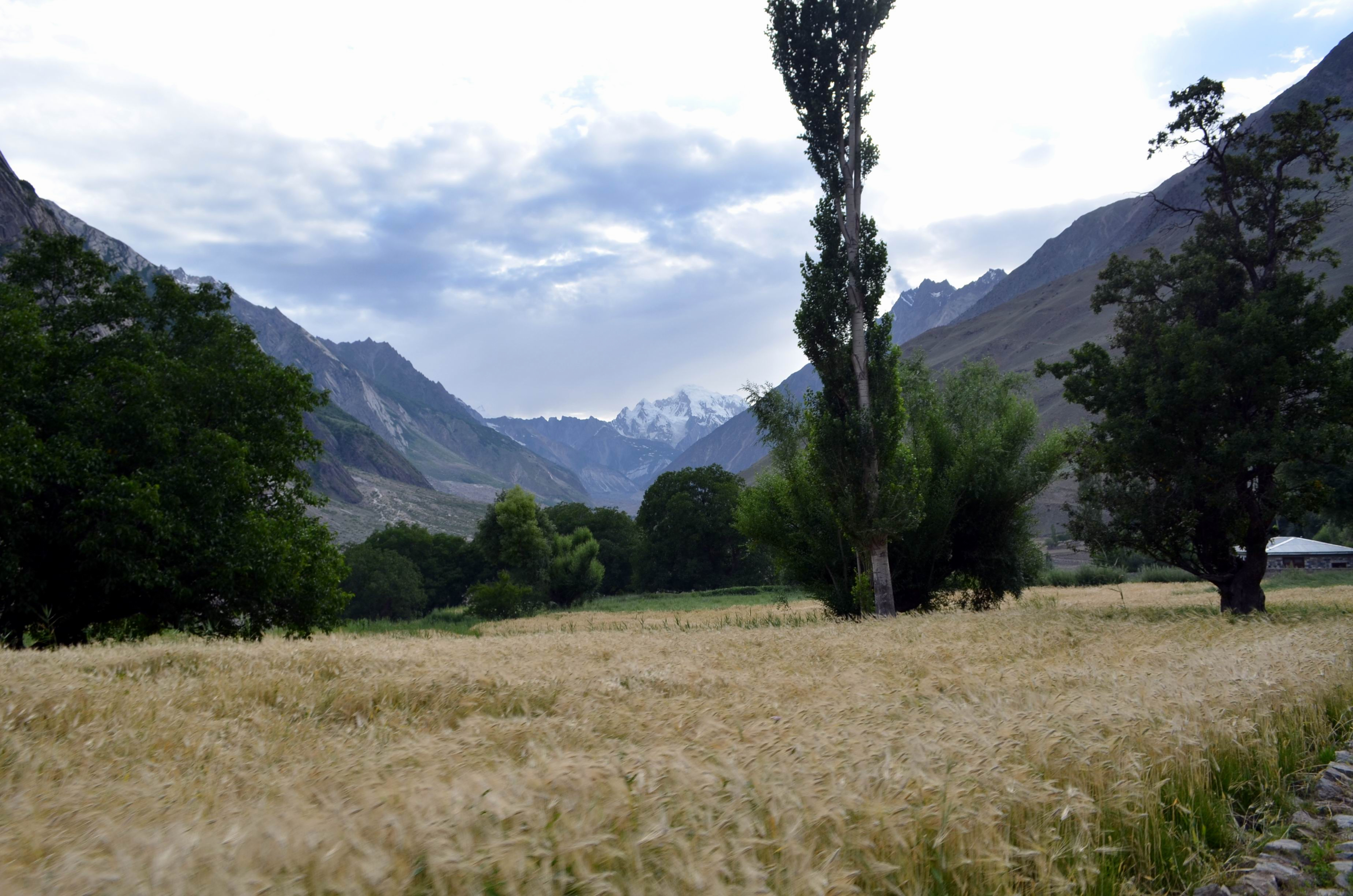
Bhasha Valley

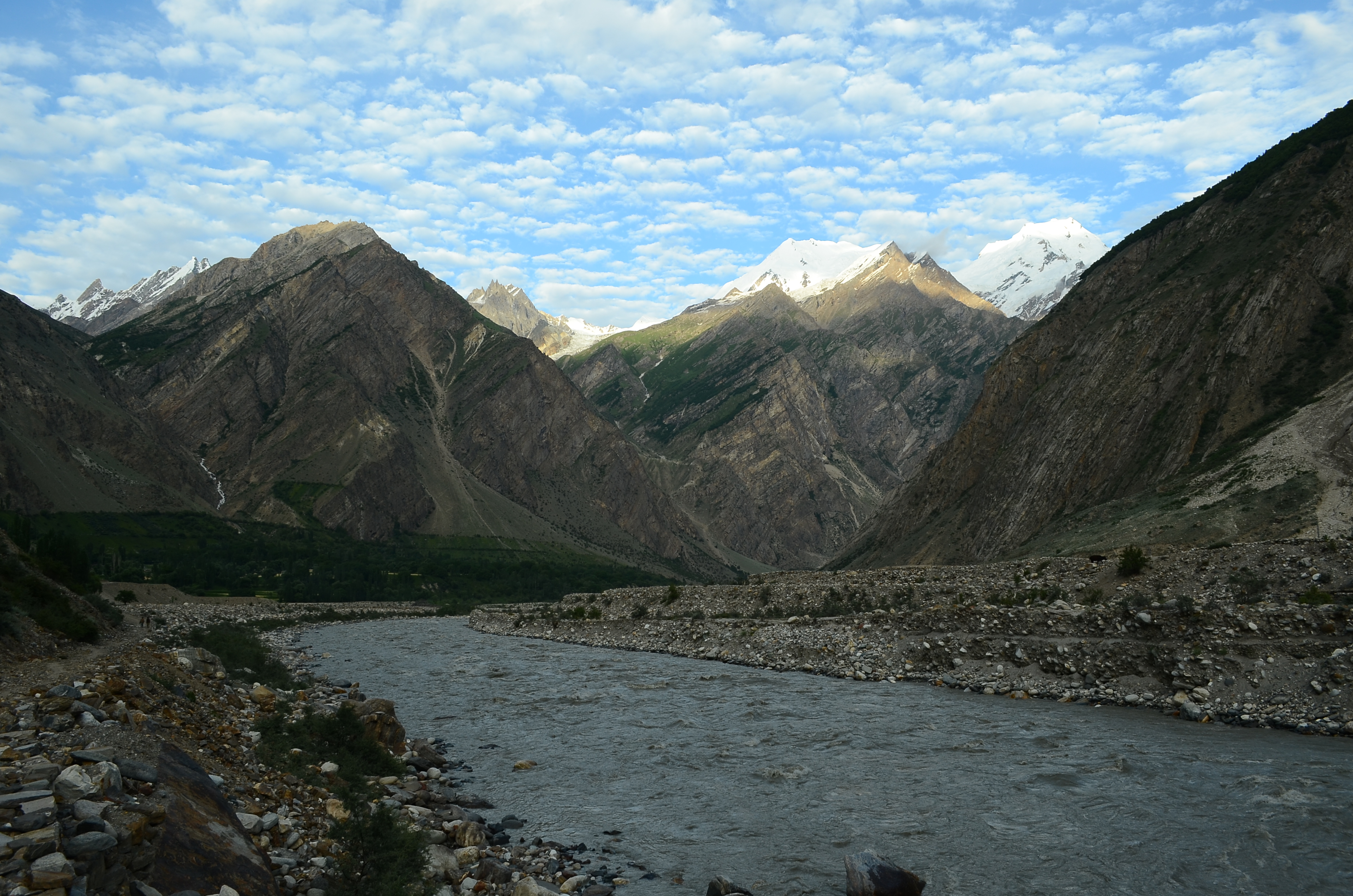
Bhasha Valley

== See also ==
- Shigar Fort
- Shigar Valley
