= Shigar River =

River in Shigar Valley, Gilgit Baltistan, Pakistan

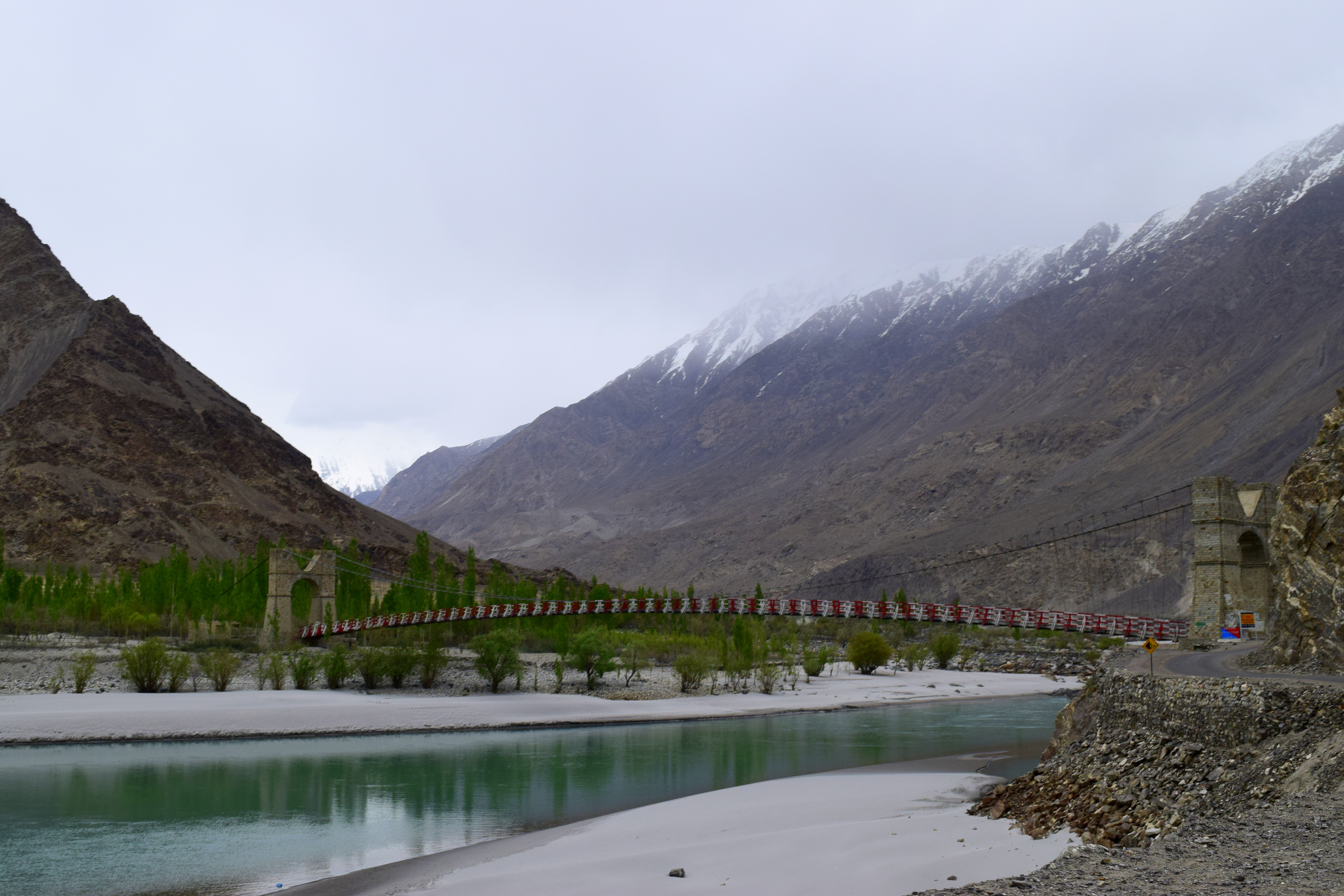
- Shigar river near its confluence with Indus River

- Location within Gilgit Baltistan Location within Pakistan

Location
- Country: Pakistan
- Province: Gilgit-Baltistan

Physical characteristics
- Mouth
  - location: Indus River
  - coordinates: 35°19′52″N 75°38′0″E
- Discharge
  - location: Shigar Gauging Station
  - average: 223.25 m^{3}/s (7,884 cu ft/s) (Period: 1985–1998)
  - minimum: 142.06 m^{3}/s (5,017 cu ft/s) (Period: 1985–1998)
  - maximum: 330.64 m^{3}/s (11,676 cu ft/s) (Period: 1985–1998)

Shigar River (Urdu: دریائے شگر) is a main river flowing through the mountainous Shigar Valley, in Baltistan region of northern Pakistan.

== Course ==
The Shigar River is formed from the melted water of the Baltoro Glacier and Biafo Glacier. It flows through the Shigar Valley. The river is the main right-bank tributary of the Indus River at its mouth and meets the Indus in the Skardu Valley.

== Hydrology ==
The catchment area of Shigar River is 6,610 km^{2} (2,550 sq mi) while its mean annual discharge at Shigar during the period 1985–1998 was 223 m^{3}/s (7,900 cu ft/s), with a minimum and maximum discharge of 142 m^{3}/s (5,000 cu ft/s) and 330 m^{3}/s (12,000 cu ft/s), respectively.
