= Shigar Valley =

Valley in Gilgit-Baltistan, Pakistan

Shigar وادئ شگر شگر
- District Shigar
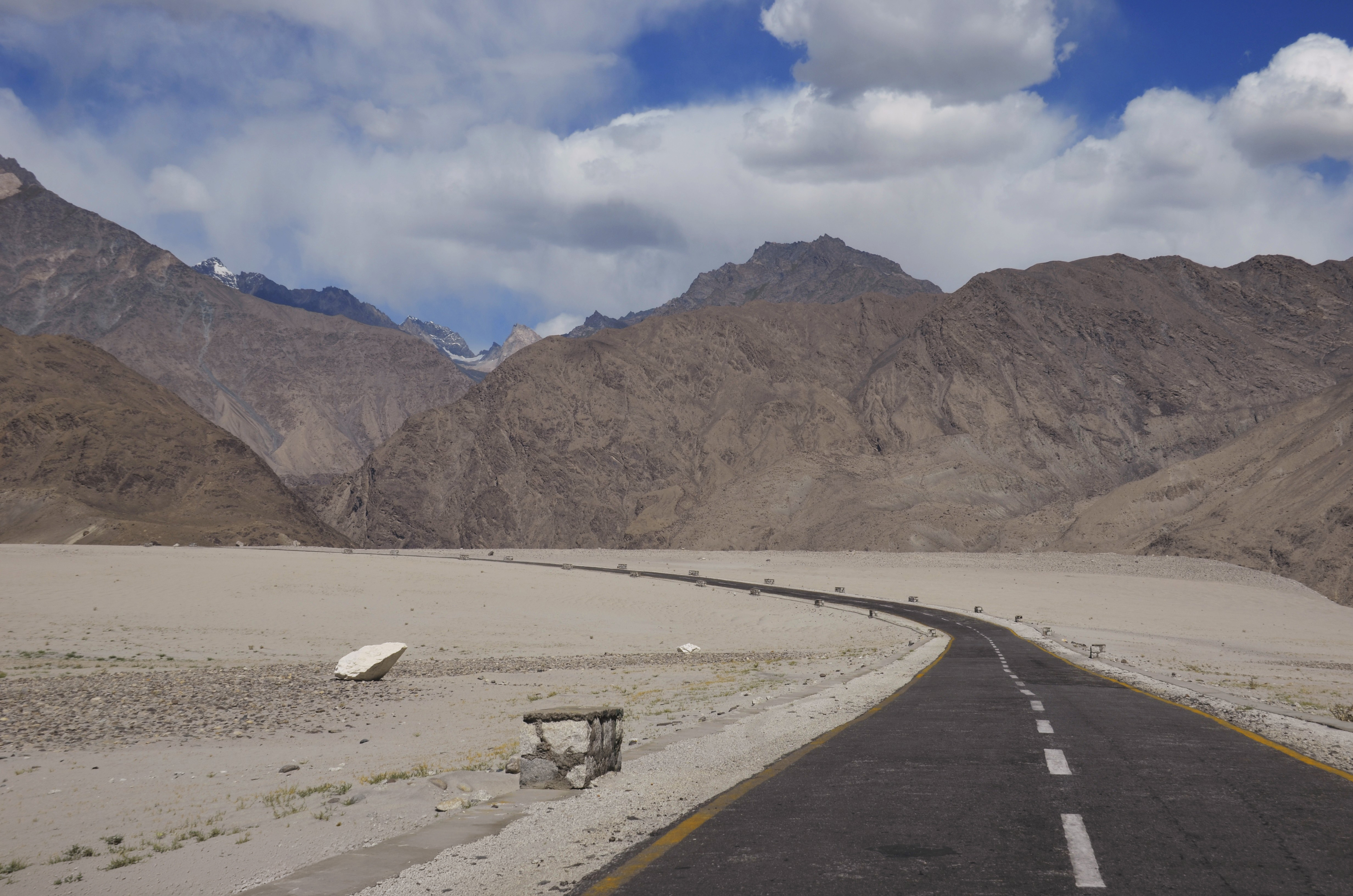
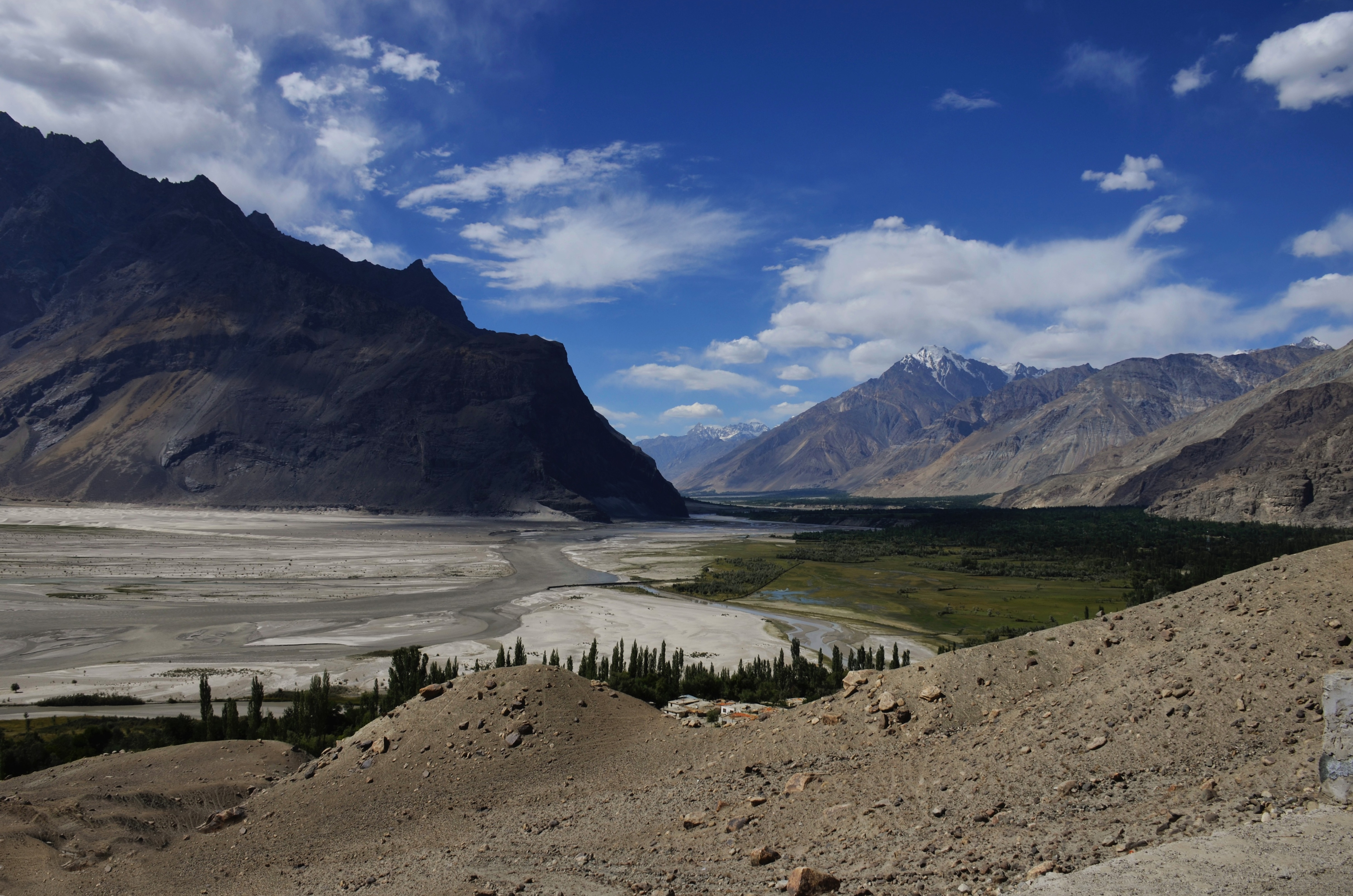
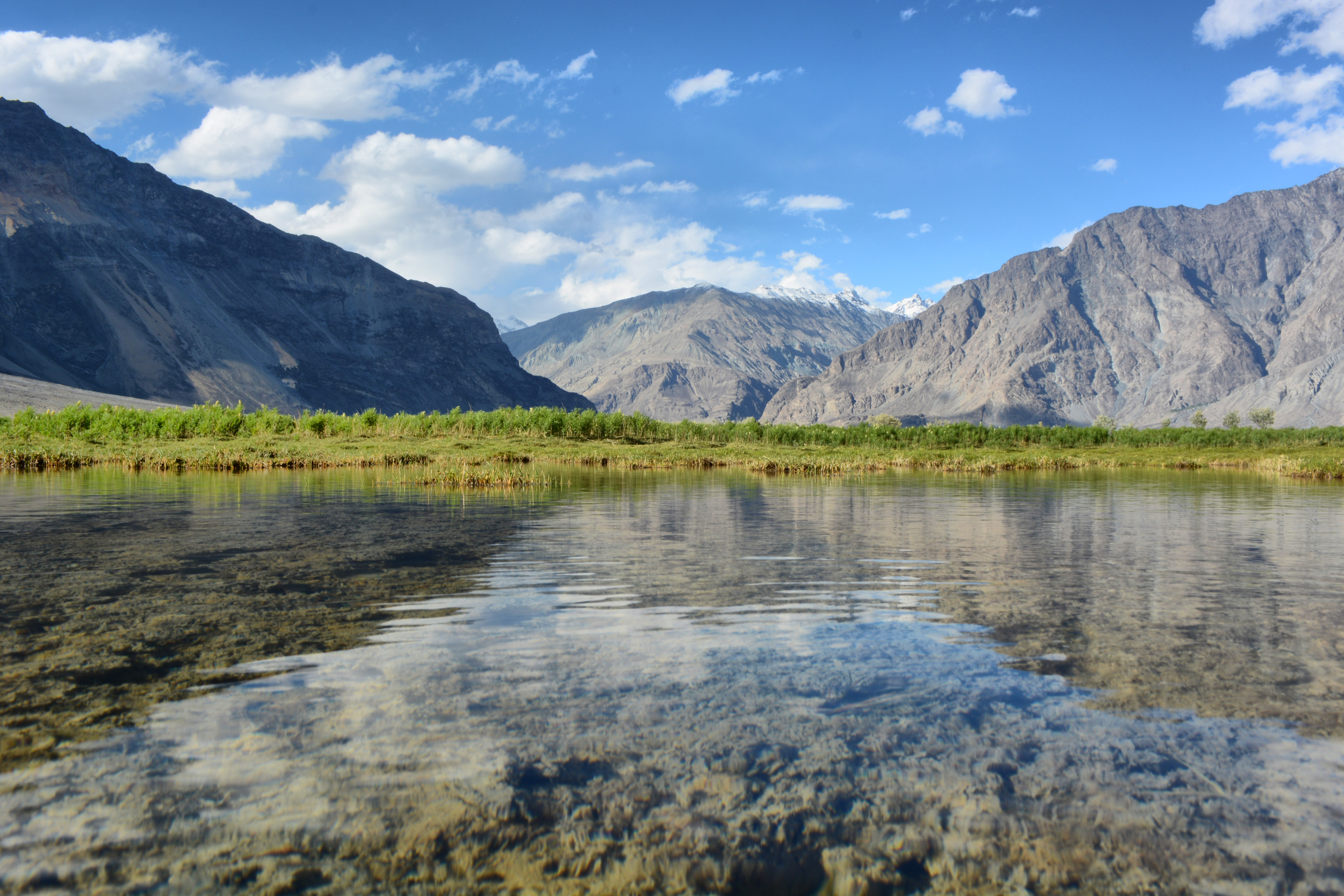
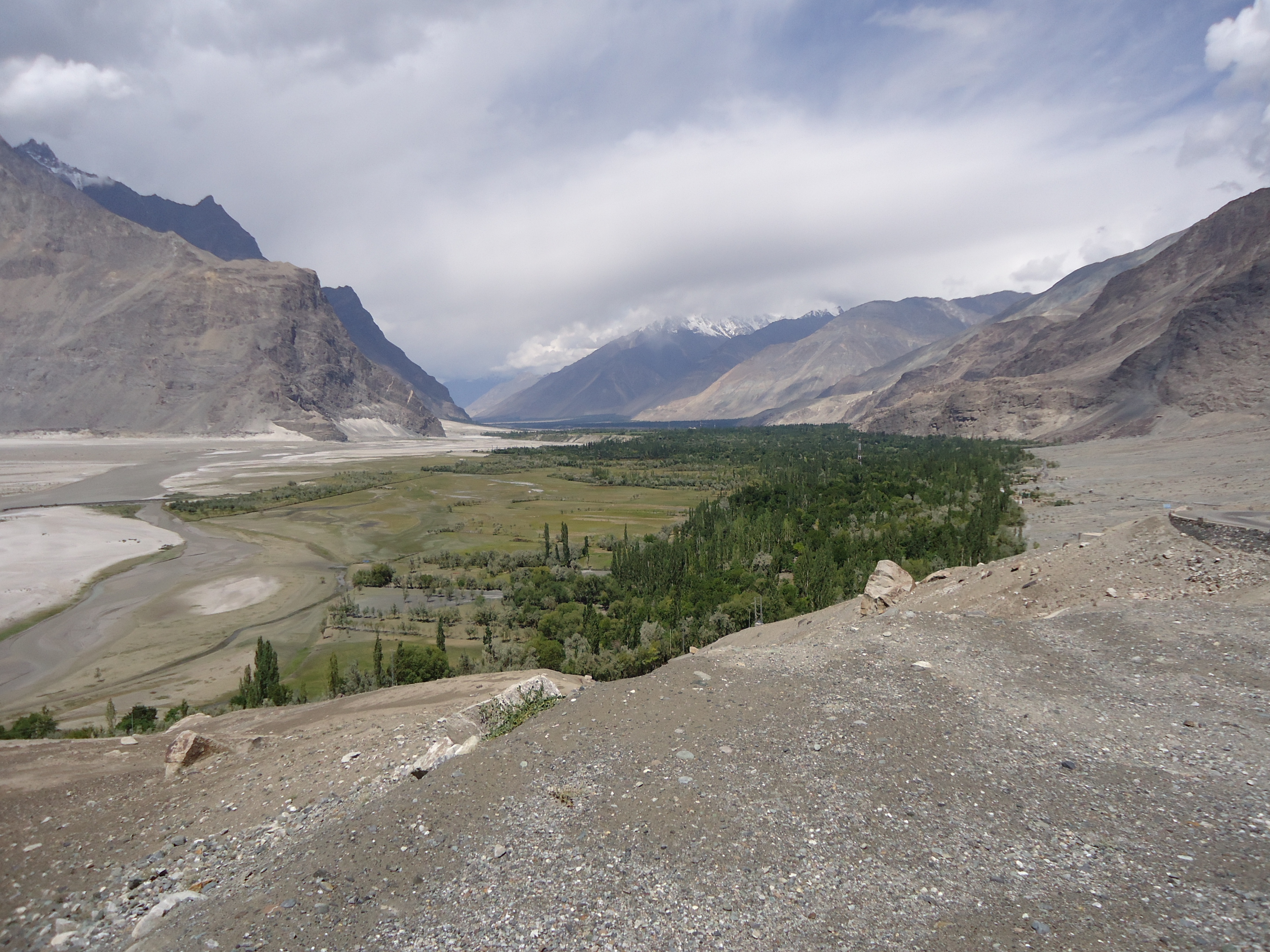
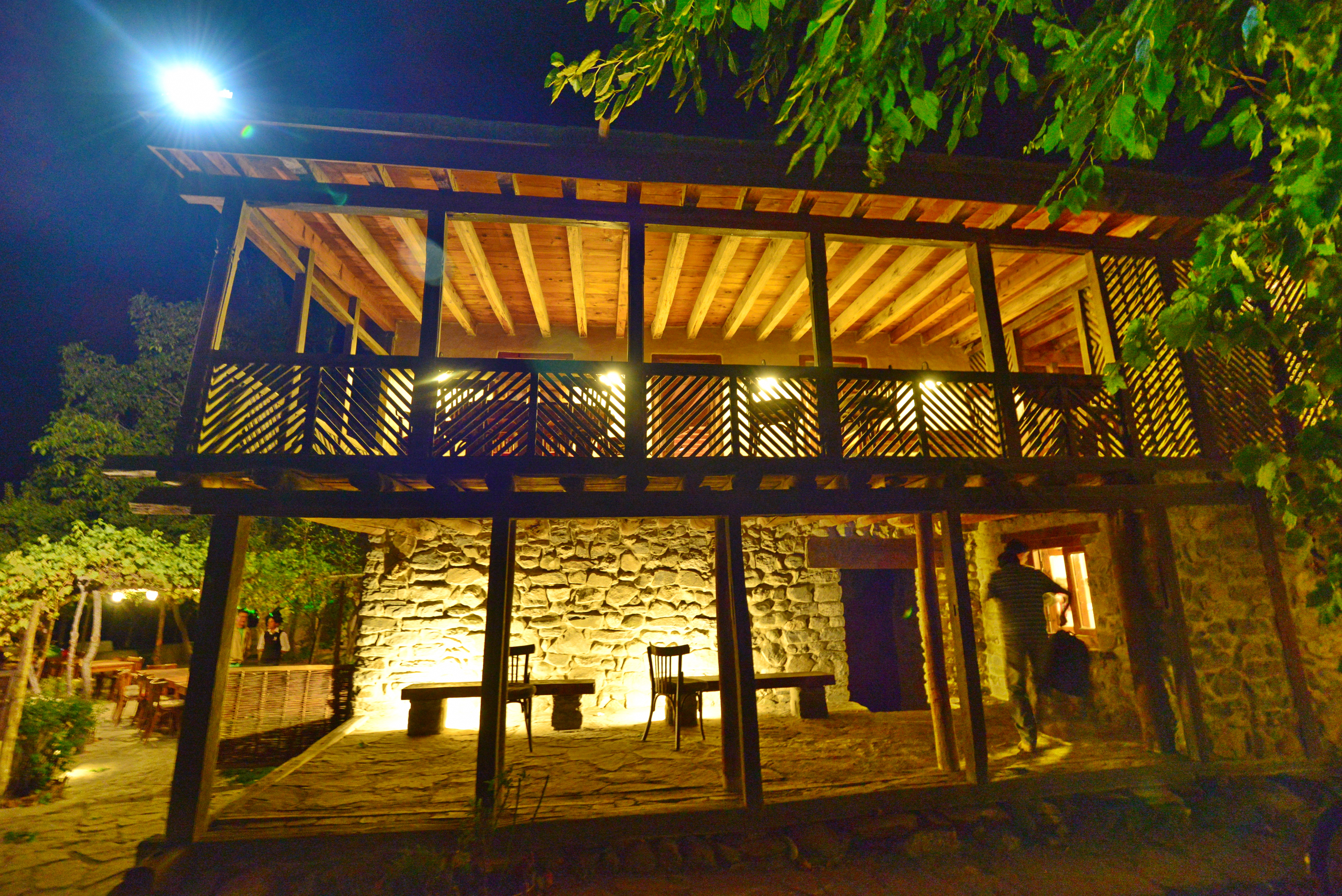
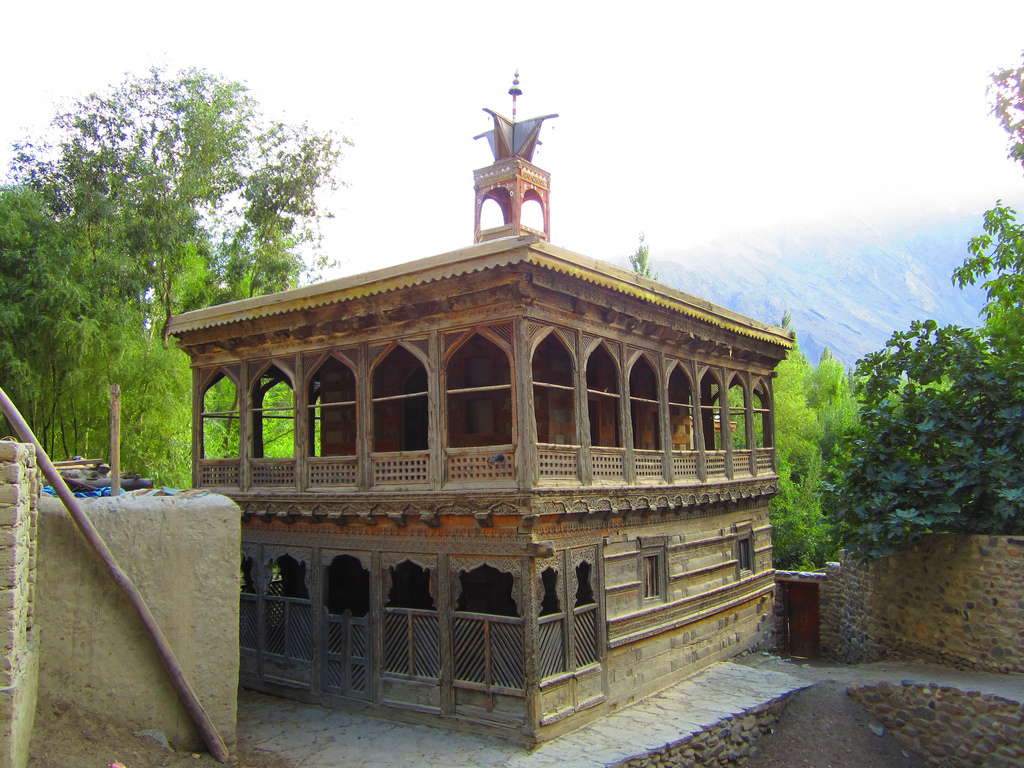

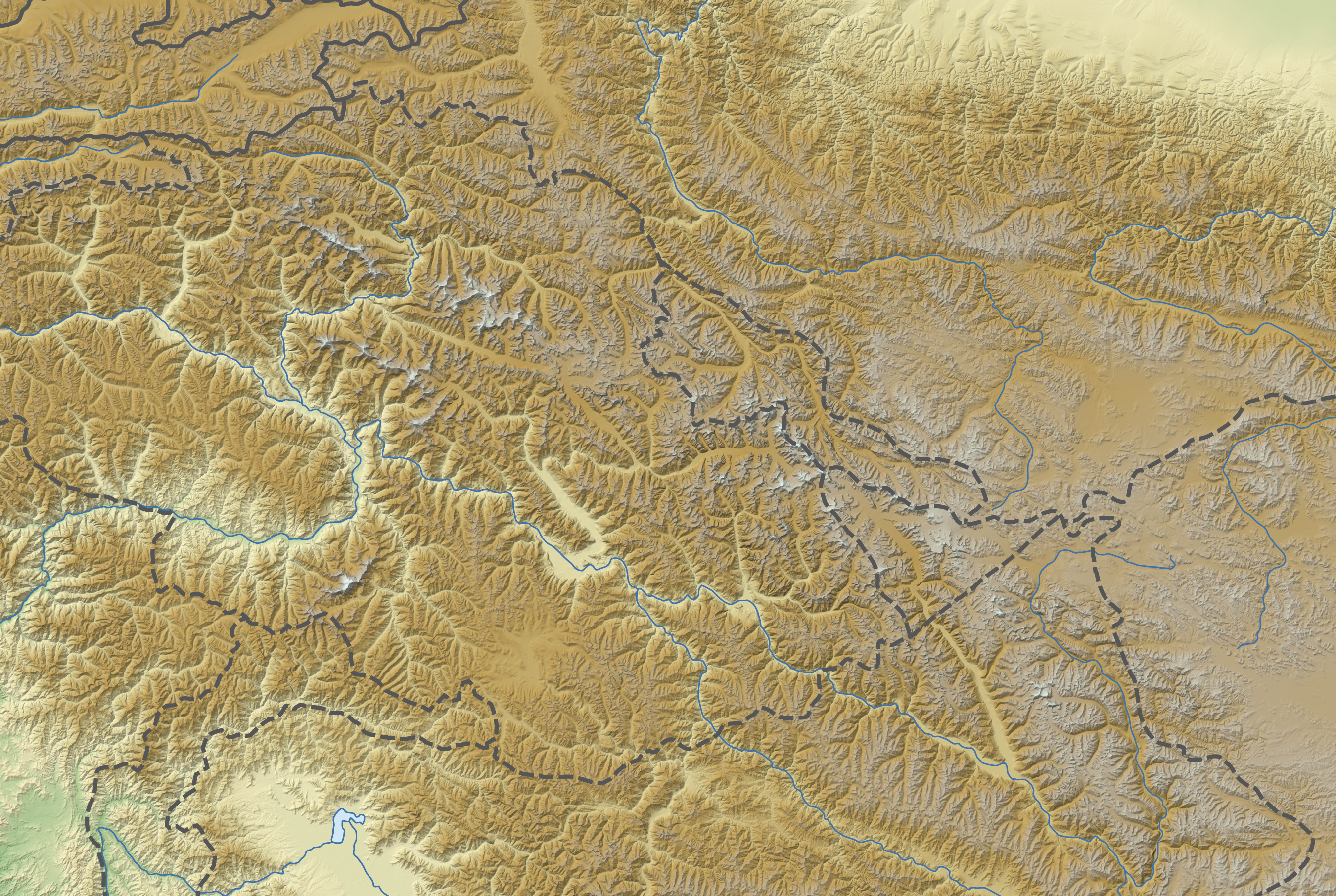
- Hassanabad on Pakistan Map
- Coordinates: 35°25′32″N 75°43′59″E
- Country: Pakistan
- Autonomous region: Gilgit-Baltistan
- District: Shigar
- Time zone: UTC+5 (PST)
  - Summer (DST): UTC+6 (GMT+5)

The Shigar Valley (Urdu: وادئ شگر) is a valley in Gilgit Baltistan in northern Pakistan that is watered by the Shigar River, and centred on the town of Shigar.

The valley stretches about 170 km from Skardu to Askole and is the gateway to the high mountains of the Karakoram. The town of Shigar is the largest settlement in the valley. Even though the Shigar Valley is a remote and largely inaccessible place, there are several villages in the valley. Askole is the last settlement in the Shigar Valley, which is still far from the high mountains. Shigar was an administrative sub-division of Skardu District before it was made a district in its own right.

This valley is a popular destination for hiking, trekking and mountaineering, despite the tough conditions there. Also, the valley is an attraction for the tourists as it is a gateway to Karakoram peaks, including the world's second highest peak, K2.

The local language is only Balti here. This area was once called Little Tibet according to records kept here. But the clothes or food of the people here now, show no trace of Buddhist culture. In 2014, approximately 70,000 people who live here are predominantly Shia.

The local Balti community’s use of medicinal plants has been surveyed in an ethnobotanical study. Shigar Valley offers plains and meadows, forests and trees laden with cherry, apple, apricot, mulberry. Polo is the national game of Baltistan.
