= Geography of Gilgit-Baltistan =

Gilgit-Baltistan is an administrative territory of Pakistan in the northern part of the country. It was granted self-governing status on 29 August 2009. The main political centres are the towns of Gilgit, Skardu and Chilas.

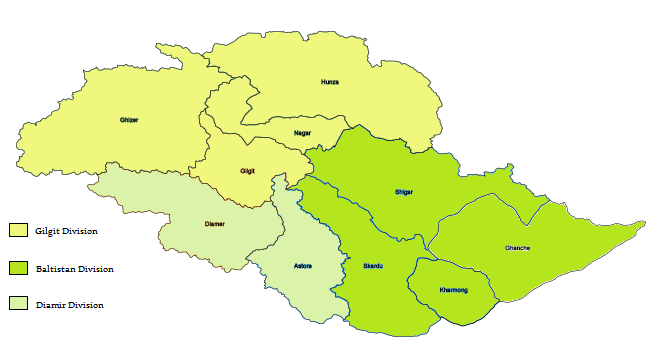
Districts of Gilgit-Baltistan, 2024

Gilgit-Baltistan has a high-altitude desert climate. It is home to some of the highest mountain ranges and all five Pakistan's eight-thousanders, including K2, the second-highest peak in the world. The main ranges are the Karakoram and the western Himalayas. The Pamir mountains are to the north and the Hindu Kush lies to the west. It is also home to some of the longest glaciers outside Polar regions.

== Gilgit Division ==
The Gilgit Division is mainly defined by the long Gilgit Valley which is traversed by Gilgit River. Gilgit River originates from Shandur Lake just besides the Shandur Pass, which separates Gilgit Valley from Chitral Valley. The river valley is at most parts narrow but widens at Punial and later near where Hunza River joins it, at the point where Gilgit is located. Politically, the Wakhan Corridor of Afghanistan in the north separates it from Badakhshan region of Tajikistan. Other river valleys in the division include Yasin, Ishkoman and Hunza, the last of which connects it to the Xinjiang region of China through the high-altitude Khunjerab Pass. Sost is the last Pakistani town near the Sino-Pak border. A small strip of the Ghizer District is sandwiched between Chitral in Khyber Pakhtunkhwa and the Wakhan Corridor. The capital of the Ghizer District is Gakuch.

Indus River after flowing through Baltistan joins Gilgit River near Jaglot, at the point where Hindu Kush, Himalayas and Karakoram meet. The highest peak in the Gilgit Division is Distaghil Sar (7,885 m), the 19th-highest mountain in the world. Other well-known peaks include Kunyang Chhish (7,852 m, 21st-highest in the world), Batura Sar (7,795 m), 25th-highest in the world), Kanjut Sar (7,790 m), 26th-highest in the world), and Rakaposhi (7,788 m), 27th-highest in the world. Koyo Zum (6,871 m) in Ghizer is the highest peak of Hindu Raj. The Major passes include Karambar Pass, Chillinji Pass, Hayal Pass, Naltar Pass, Bichhar Pass, Thoi Pass, and Darkot Pass.

== Diamer Division ==
The Diamer Division is where the Karakoram Highway enters Gilgit-Baltistan from Khyber Pakhtunkhwa. The capital is Chilas. It is mainly traversed by the Indus River which after receiving tributaries from Gilgit-Baltistan enters Kohistan, separated from it on the southwest by Babusar Pass. The Astore River from Astore Valley is one of the left tributaries of Indus, draining into it near Jaglot. The highest peak in the division is Nanga Parbat (8,126 m), the 9th highest mountain in the world. Minimarg, Tarashing, Rupal, and Rama Sar Lake in Astore are among popular tourist places. Diamer is the most forested region in Gilgit-Baltistan.

== Baltistan Division ==
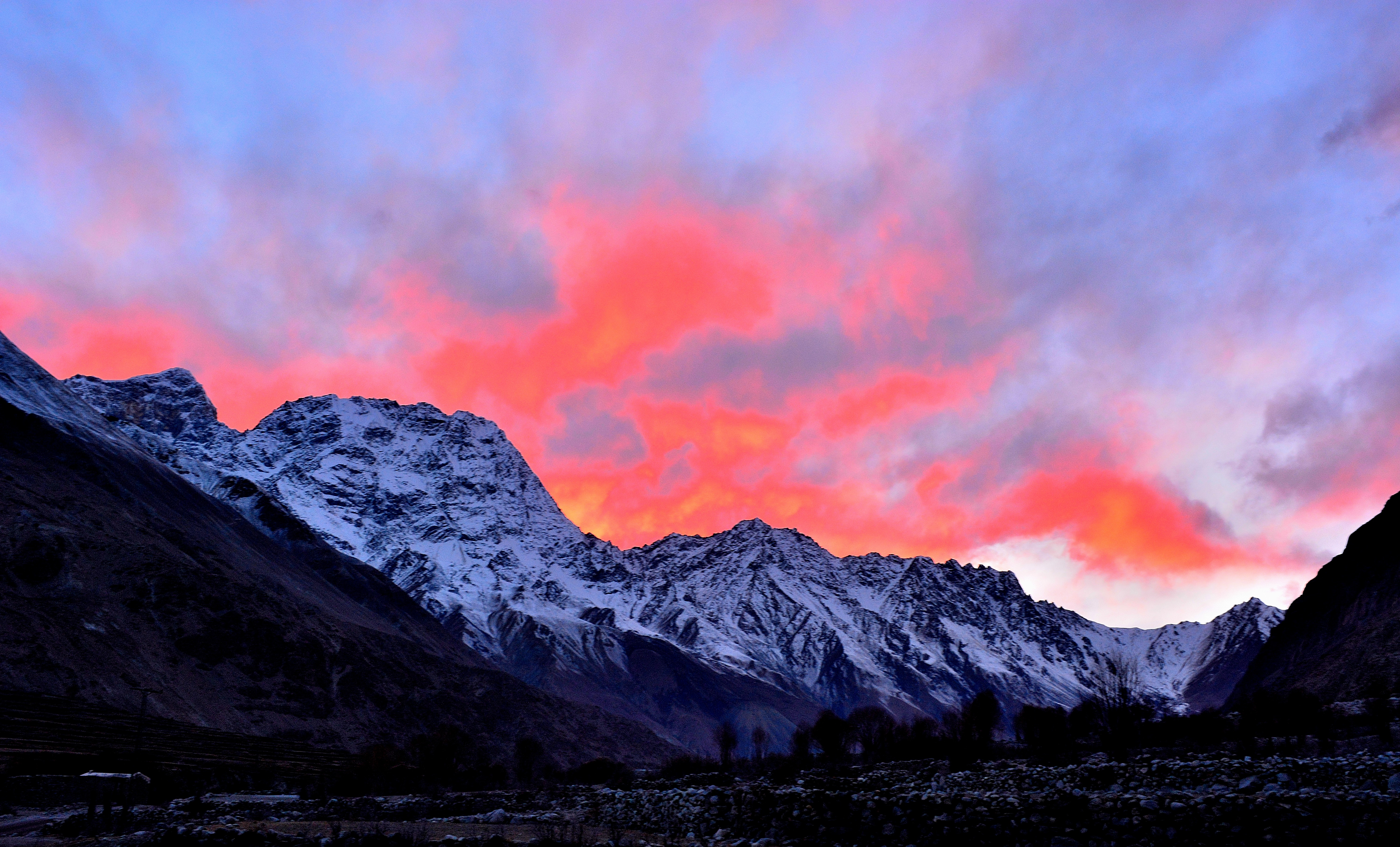
An evening at Goma village, Ghanche, taken just before the start of winter season.

The Baltistan Division is highly glaciated. The capital is Skardu. Baltoro Muztagh, the subrange of the Karakoram that includes K2 (8,611 m), Broad Peak (8,047 m), the Gasherbrums (8,000+ meters) and Masherbrum (7,821 m), are also located in the division. Askole is the last settlement for all treks to Concordia. It also includes almost all of the Deosai Plateau, which is the second-highest plateau in the world. Indus River enters from Ladakh through Kharmang into Baltistan; to further north Shyok River enters via Khaplu Valley. Shigar River in the Shigar Valley is its right tributary. The Actual Ground Position Line (AGPL) is at the easternmost part of Baltistan across the Saltoro Ridge. The Line of Control along the easternmost region of the Ghanche District ends before the start of the Siachen Glacier (entirely under control of India) at NJ9842.

Some of the longest non-polar glaciers in the world, namely the Baltoro Glacier, the Biafo Glacier, the Batura Glacier, and a major part of the Hispar Glacier, are also located in Baltistan. The highest peak in Ghanche District is Saltoro Kangri (7,742 m), which is the 31st-highest peak in the world.

Some of the notable lakes in Baltistan are Snow Lake, Satpara Lake, Sheosar Lake, Kachura Lake, and Shangrila Lake. Notable towns in the district are Khaplu, Keris, Siksa, and Balghar.

Other prominent rivers in the division are Shyok River, the Hushe River in Hushe Valley and the Thalle River.
