= Gishgish =

Village in Gilgit-Baltistan, Pakistan

Coordinates: 36°28′24″N 73°50′48″E

Gishgish is a village situated in the Ishkoman Valley, within the Ghizer District of Gilgit-Baltistan, Pakistan, just beyond BarJungle. It is located approximately 115 km upstream from Gilgit, and 45 km from Gahkuch. The village is divided into two sections: Gishgish Bala and Gishgish Pain.
