= Khora Bhurt Pass =

Mountain pass in Pakistan and Afghanistan

- Interactive map of Khora Bhurt Pass
- Elevation: 15,190 feet (4,630 m)

Third Approach
- Location: Afghanistan–Pakistan border
- Range: Hindukush Mountains
- Coordinates: 36°51′28″N 73°57′19″E

Khora Bhurt pass, also known as Khodarg Werth and sometimes spelt Khora Bort (Khowar: کھورابورت, lit. 'milestone'), is a high mountain pass at an elevation of 4,630 metres (15,190 ft). It connects the Karambar valley in Ishkoman tehsil of Ghizer district in Gilgit–Baltistan, northern Pakistan, with the Wakhan valley in Afghanistan.

To trek from Gahkuch to the Gilgit River is extremely difficult in winter, with snow blocking communication with Wakhan. The route through Karambar Valley and over Khora Bhurt Pass to the Afghan Pamir is only passable in early spring and autumn. An old trade route over Khora Bhurt Pass connects to the Wakhan, but access is only possible from a tributary valley below the Chateboi glacier tongue.
