= Shingus =

Village in Gilgit-Baltistan, Pakistan

Shengus شینگسو
- Village
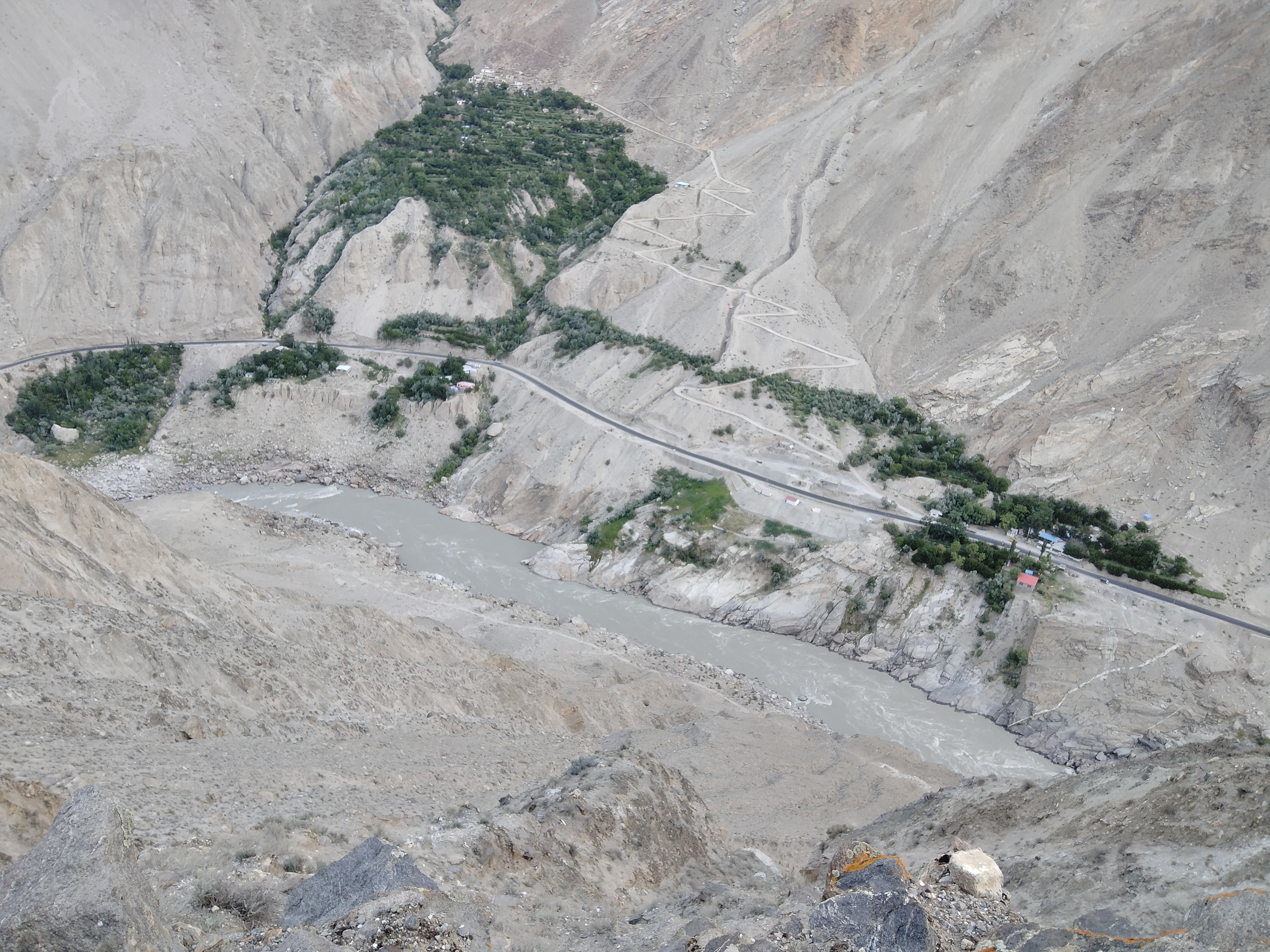
- Shengus seen from across the Indus River

- Location within Gilgit Baltistan
- Coordinates: 35.73°N 74.81°E
- Country: Pakistan
- Province: Gilgit-Baltistan
- District: Roundu District
- Elevation: 2,275 m (7,464 ft)

Population (2017)
  - Total: 3,000
  - Estimate: 2,500

Languages
  - Official: Urdu, Shina
- Time zone: UTC+5 (PST)

Shengus (also known as Shingus) is a village located in Roundu District within the Gilgit-Baltistan region of Pakistan. Positioned along the Gilgit-Skardu Road, it sits approximately 53 kilometers from Skardu City.

The village lies within the Shingus pegmatite region, one of Pakistan's most extensive pegmatite zones. This area holds significant geological importance due to its position on the Indo-Pakistan plate, situated in a subduction zone where Precambrian gneisses of the Nanga Parbat complex override Cretaceous amphibole-pyroxene granulites from the Kohistan island arc.

Shengus has cold winters and cool summers, like most places in Gilgit-Baltistan. Most people there are from the Shina tribe. Some also speak Balti because the village is close to Skardu and people have moved there from nearby areas.
