= Karambar Pass =

Pakistani mountain pass

- Interactive map of Karambar Pass
- Elevation: 4,343 metres (14,249 ft)

Third Approach
- Location: Pakistan
- Range: Hindukush Mountains
- Coordinates: 36°52′46″N 73°40′28″E

Karambar Pass, with an elevation of 4,343 m (14,249 ft), is a mountain pass in Pakistan. The pass serves as a crucial link between the Yarkhun River valley in the Upper Chitral District and the Karambar River valley in the Ishkoman tehsil of Ghizer District within Hunza Valley. Its name is occasionally misspelled as Karomber or Kromber Pass.

Geologists refer to the Karambar Unit when discussing features such as the Karambar Pass, River and Karambar Lake. This unit extends north and east of the Baroghil-Lashkargaz Unit, lying between the Chiantar Glacier and southern Wakhan, and primarily north of the Afghanistan border. It is renowned for having the most extensive and well-preserved paleozoic strata in the Karakoram Range.

The pass is one mile to the west of Karambar Lake and two miles to the south of Dupsuk peak (5748m), which is the meeting point of Pakistan, Afghanistan and Pakistan Kashmir. Approximately 15 miles to the west of the pass lies the prominent Broghol pass. The Karambar River flows out of Karambar Lake in an initially southeast direction. South of Imit it is known as the Ishkoman river and joins the Ghizar river at Gahkuch to become the Gilgit river.
