= Kalandar Pass =

Mountain pass in Pakistan and Afghanistan

- Interactive map of Kalandar Pass
- Elevation: 17,130 feet (5,220 m)

Third Approach
- Location: Afghanistan–Pakistan border
- Range: Hindukush Mountains
- Coordinates: 36°54′22″N 73°53′51″E

Kalandar pass, also known as Qalandar Uwin pass, is a high mountain pass in the Hindu Kush mountain range with an elevation of 17,130 ft.

This pass connects the Karambar River Valley, upper Gilgit Valley, in Ishkoman Tehsil of Ghizer District of Pakistan, with the Wakhan Corridor in Afghanistan.
