= Papaldo =

Village in Gilgit-Baltistan, Pakistan

Papaldo پاپالڈو
- Village
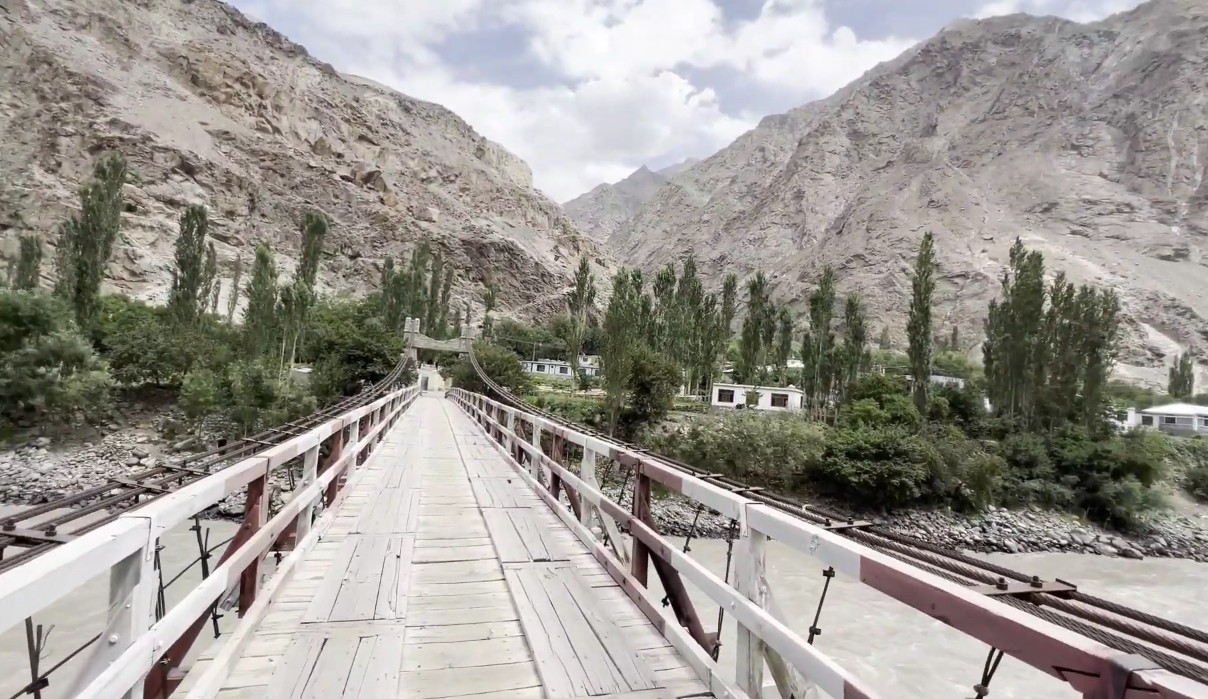
- Papaldo Village with the suspension bridge

- Location within Gilgit Baltistan
- Coordinates: 34.89°N 76.19°E
- Country: Pakistan
- Province: Gilgit-Baltistan
- District: Skardu District
- Elevation: 1,800 m (5,900 ft)

Population (2017)
  - Total: 2,000
  - Estimate: 1,500

Languages
  - Official: Urdu, Balti
- Time zone: UTC+5 (PST)

Papaldo is a village in the Skardu District of Gilgit-Baltistan, Pakistan. It is located near the Line of Control (LoC) and in close proximity to the villages of Shiriting and Gambat Brok. Positioned along the Indus River, it is connecting by a suspension bridge spanning the river. The village lies approximately 100 km south of Skardu City.

In the early 20th century, Papaldo was noted as a large village situated 15 miles from Skardu, accessible by crossing a rope bridge over the Indus River.

The climate in Papaldo is characterized as subarctic, with severe winters, no dry season, and cool summers. The region experiences an average annual temperature of approximately -10.08 °C (13.86 °F). It has around 1,500 inhabitants. The inhabitants are primarily of Balti ethnicity, speaking the Balti language, an ancient form of Tibetan.
