= Newrangha =

Newrangha is an area of Skardu District in Baltistan.
