= BarJungle =

Coordinates: 36°26′31″N 73°50′32″E

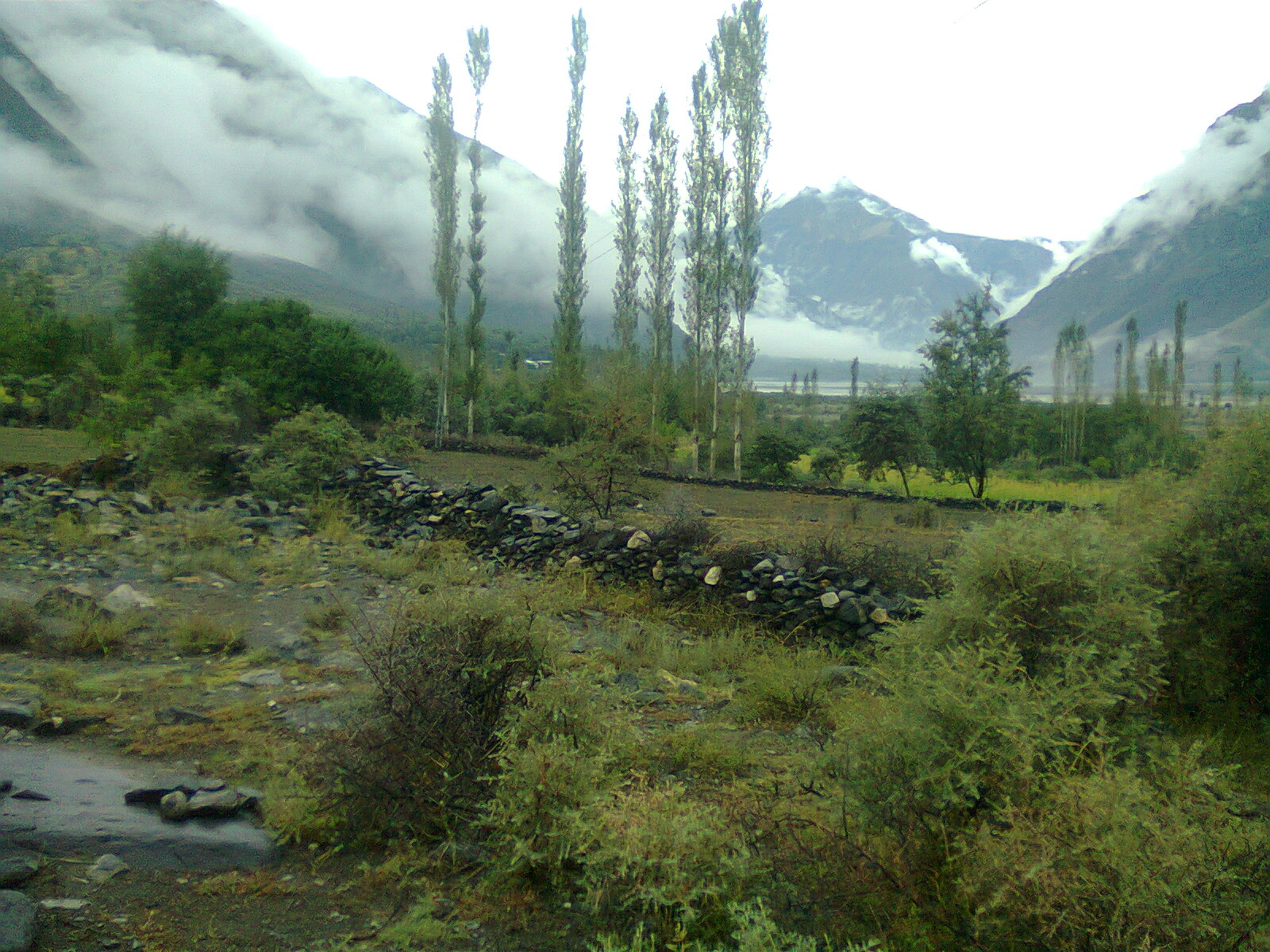
BarJungle, Gilgit-Baltistan, Pakistan.

BarJungle is a village located in the heart of Ishkoman Valley, Ghizer District, Gilgit-Baltistan, Pakistan, and is 100 km (62 mi) from Gilgit city. The village consists of five muhallahs, named Aliabad (shapeergoal), Ghutum (bazar area), Pir, Amanabad and Nowbahar (koloomshogour).

== Description ==
The village has about 2,000 inhabitants. Most of the people living in BarJungle migrated from various villages in the Hunza Valley. The five languages spoken in BarJungle are Burushaski, Khowar, Wakhi, Shina and Gojari. The majority of the population can speak and understand the first three.

The village hosts four schools, four mosques, two irrigation channels, a water supply system, a playground, shops and a hospital along with good road access from Gilgit.
