= Chillinji Pass =

Pakistani mountain pass

- Interactive map of Chillinji Pass
- Elevation: 5,335 metres (17,503 ft)

Third Approach
- Location: Pakistan
- Range: Hindukush Mountains
- Coordinates: 36°48′6″N 74°3′40″E

Chillinji pass is a high mountain pass in Gilgit-Baltistan, Pakistan. It connects the Karambar valley in Ishkoman with the Chapursan river valley in Upper Hunza. Its elevation is variously marked as either 17,503 feet (5,335 m) or 17,360 feet (5,290 m). Its name is also spelled Chilinji.

The pass is 6 miles to the north of Koz Sar peak. To the west of the pass is river Karambar that is known as Ishkoman river south of Imit, and joins Ghizar river at Gahkuch to become Gilgit river. To the east of the pass is Chapursan river that flows southeast and joins Hunza river at Khudabad at Karakorum Highway. As such, Chillinji pass is the closest natural path between upper Gilgit and Hunza valleys.
