= Thowar =

Pakistani valley

Thowar Valley تھوار
- Interactive map of Thowar Valley
- Coordinates: 35°31′51″N 74°24′45″E
- Administering country: Pakistan
- Province: Gilgit-Baltistan
- District: Skardu
- Tehsil: Roundu Valley
- Time zone: UTC+5 (PST)
- Website: www.trangotour.com

Thowar Valley (Urdu: تھوار, Balti: སྟཀ ནལ་) is located in the Roundu Subdivision of Skardu District within Pakistan-administered Gilgit-Baltistan, part of the disputed Kashmir region. Positioned on the right bank of the Indus River, Pakistan's longest river, the valley lies between Skardu and Gilgit city. Serving as the administrative hub of Roundu Subdivision, Shower Valley houses key facilities, including the THQ hospital, Assistant Commissioner's House, a college and other significant landmarks.

== Geography ==
In the east of the Shower valley lies the Tormik Valley, while Stak Valley and Askor Valley are to the west. On the Himalayan side, the valleys of Lower Talu, Upper Talu (formerly Talo Broq), Gangi, Bilamik, Hango, and Harpo are situated close to Thowar Roundu. To the south is the Mandi valley, and to the north is a mountainous area connecting Thowar Valley to the upper reaches of Stak and Tormik valleys.
