= Roundu District =

Administrative unit of Gilgit-Baltistan, Pakistan

Rondu District །
- District of Gilgit-Baltistan administered by Pakistan
- Interactive map of Roundu district
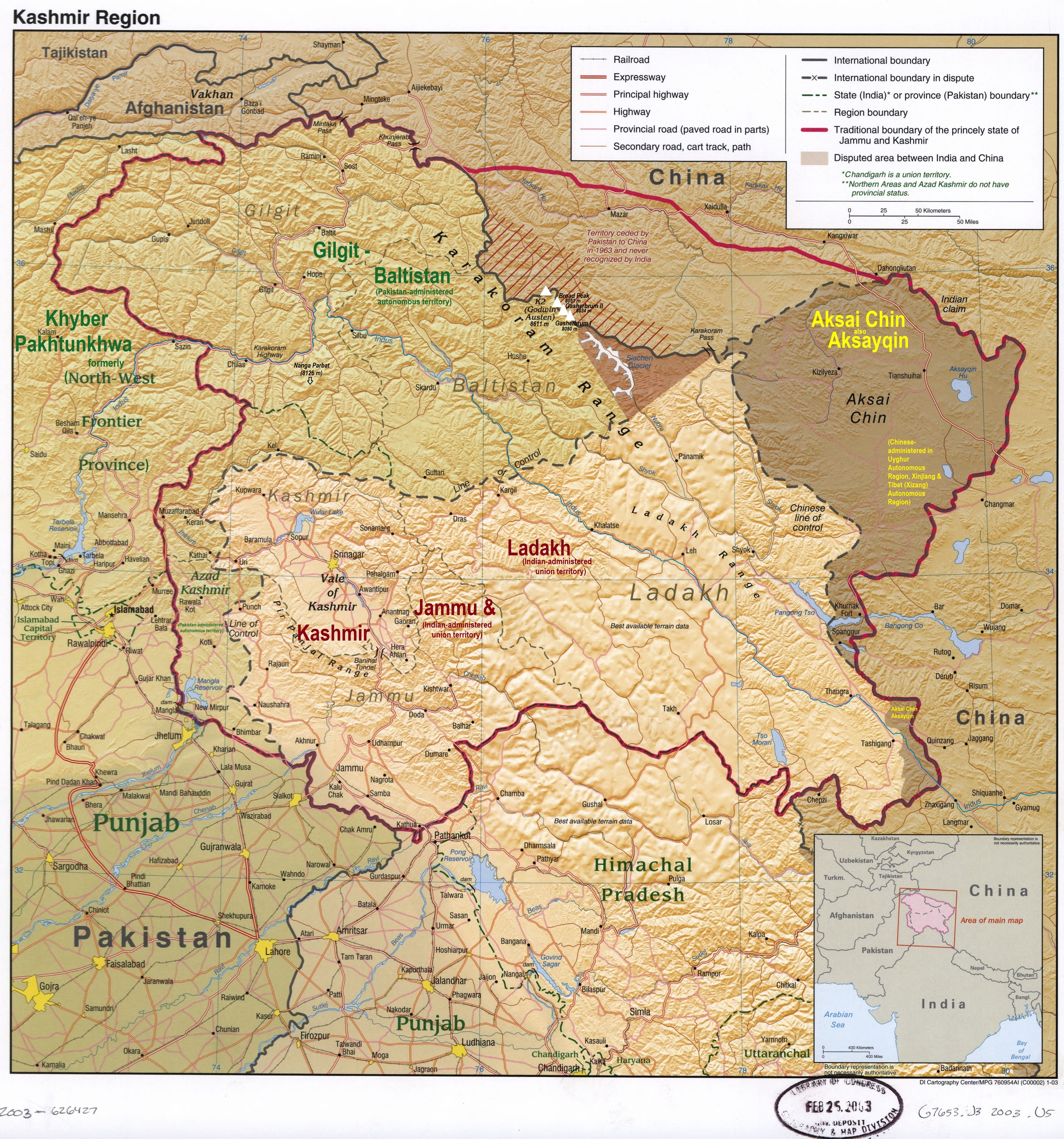
- A map showing Pakistani-administered Gilgit-Baltistan (shaded in sage green) in the disputed Kashmir region
- Coordinates: 35°33′3″N 75°20′51″E
- Administering country: Pakistan
- Territory: Gilgit-Baltistan
- Division: Baltistan Division
- Headquarters: Thowar

Government
  - Type: District Administration
  - Deputy Commissioner: Ghulam Ali
  - District Police Officer: N/A
  - District Health Officer: N/A

Area (per UNOSAT)
  - Total: 1,895 km^{2} (732 sq mi)

Population (2023, per UNOSAT)
  - Total: 39,490
  - Density: 20.84/km^{2} (53.97/sq mi)
- Number of tehsils: 0

Rondu District (Urdu: ضلع روندو), also spelled Roundu District, is a district of Pakistan-administered Gilgit-Baltistan in the disputed Kashmir region. It is one of 14 districts of Gilgit-Baltistan. The district encompasses the entire Roundu Valley, which is the fourth-largest valley in Gilgit-Baltistan, after the Skardu, Khaplu, and Shigar valleys. The Roundu valley lies in the western part of the Baltistan Division and forms the main trade and travel route between the Baltistan Division and the Gilgit Division. The Rondu District was carved out of Skardu District in 2019.

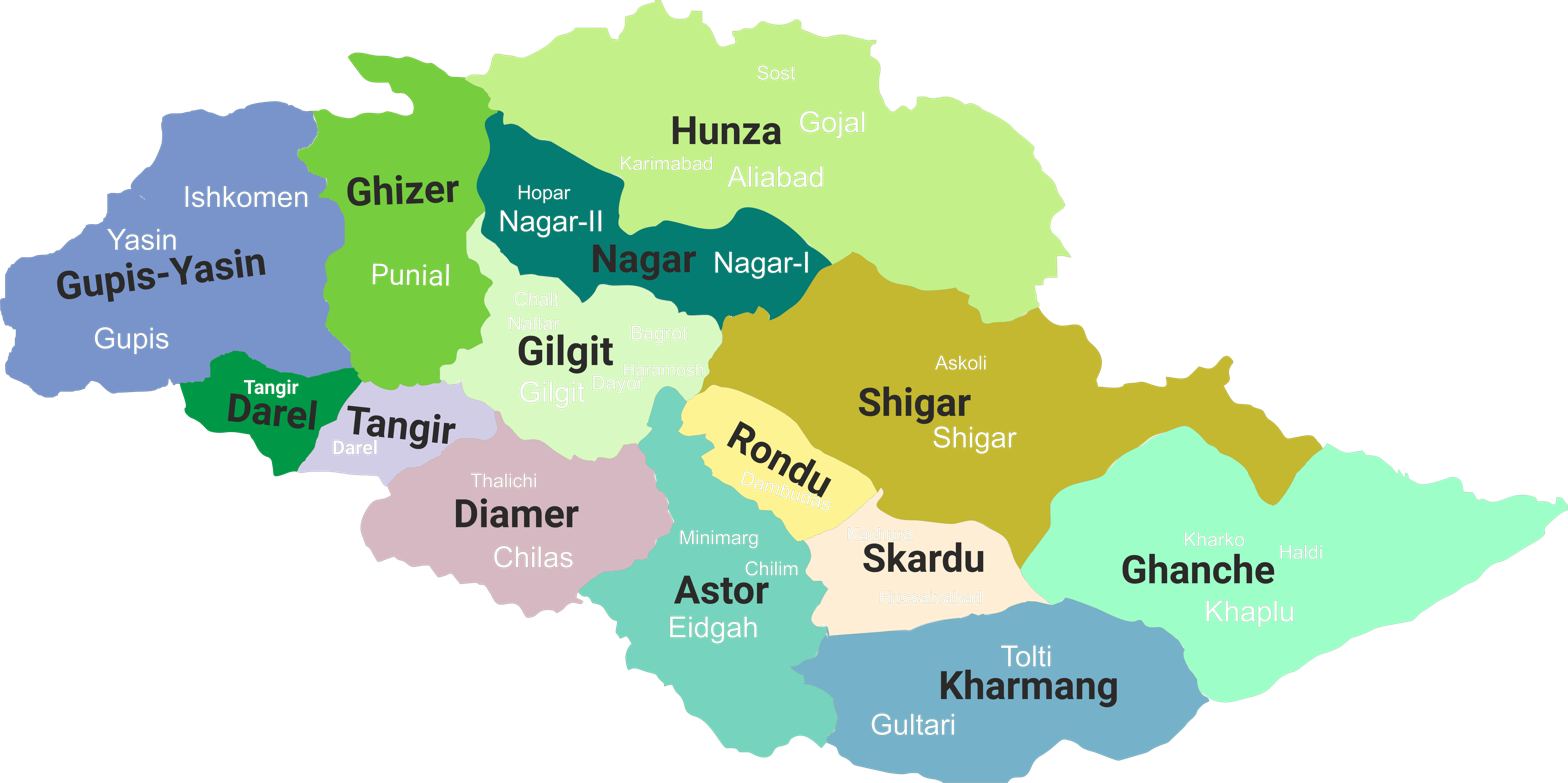
Map of Gilgit-Baltistan showing its 14 districts

== Demographics ==
The people of the Rondu Valley are predominantly Balti people, who speak the Balti language, but there are a significant number of Shina-speaking people as well. The people of the Roundu valley belong to Shia sect of Islam. The district headquarters is the town of Thowar, which is about 65–70 km from Skardu. Dambudas currently serves as the district headquarters. Although the population of Dambudas is less than that of the Stak, Thorchay, and Tormik valleys, Dambudas is located in the middle of the Rondu Valley. The literacy rate of the district is approximately 90%. About 70% of the residents speak Balti, and around 30% speak Shina, but most Shina people are bilingual, due to having lived with the Balti people for a long time. The Rondu District has very scenic and lush green valleys, such as Bilamik, Talubruq, Tormik, and Ganji (Gunji), and has four union councils: Mindi, Stak, Tormik, and Ganji.

== See also ==
- Divisions of Pakistan
- Tehsils of Pakistan
  - Tehsils of Punjab, Pakistan
  - Tehsils of Khyber Pakhtunkhwa, Pakistan
  - Tehsils of Balochistan, Pakistan
  - Tehsils of Sindh, Pakistan
  - Tehsils of Azad Kashmir
  - Tehsils of Gilgit-Baltistan
- District of Pakistan
  - Districts of Khyber Pakhtunkhwa, Pakistan
  - Districts of Punjab, Pakistan
  - Districts of Balochistan, Pakistan
  - Districts of Sindh, Pakistan
  - Districts of Azad Kashmir
