= Baltistan Division =

Administrative division of Pakistan-administered Gilgit-Baltistan

Baltistan Division بلتستان ڈویژن
- Region administered by Pakistan as a Division
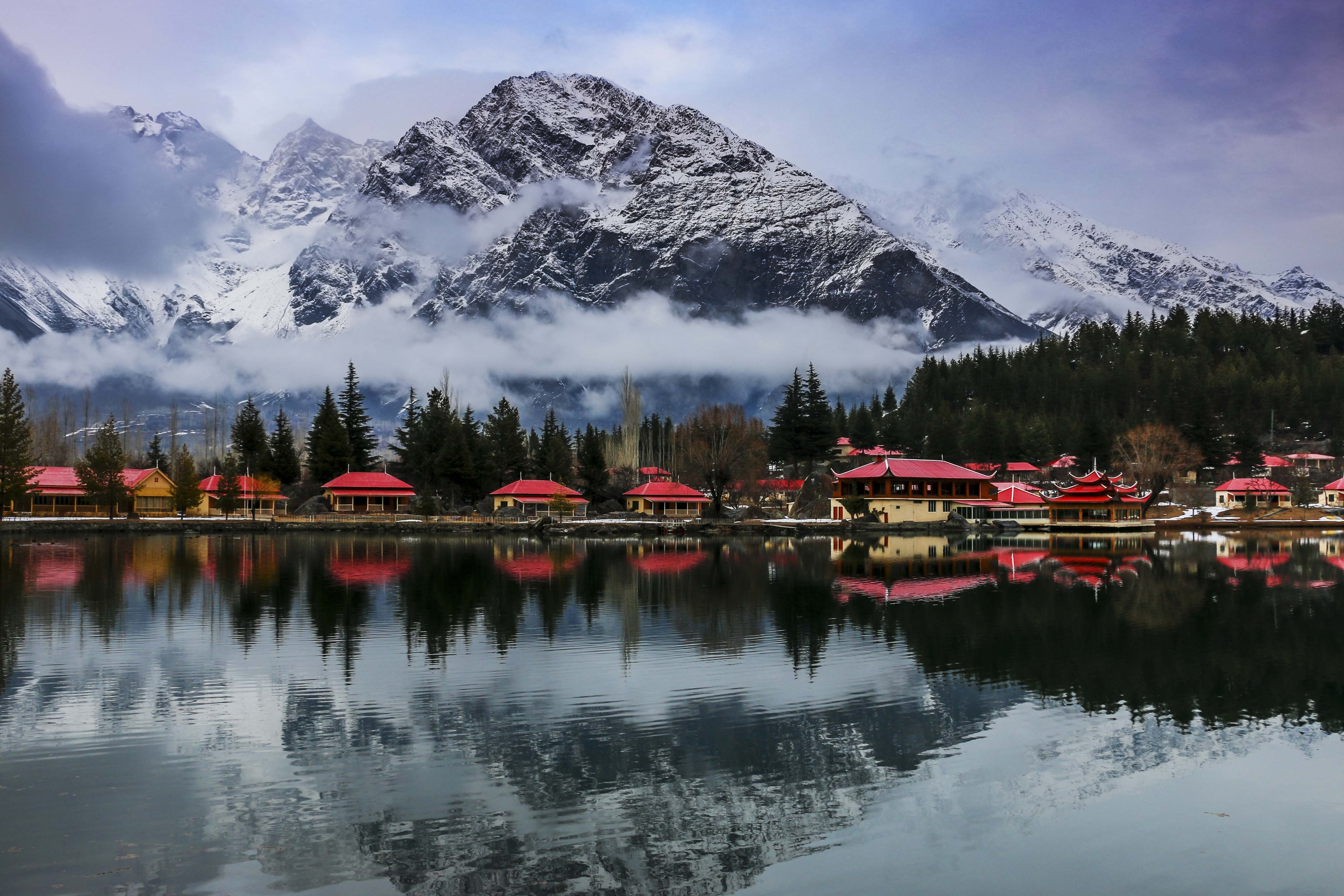

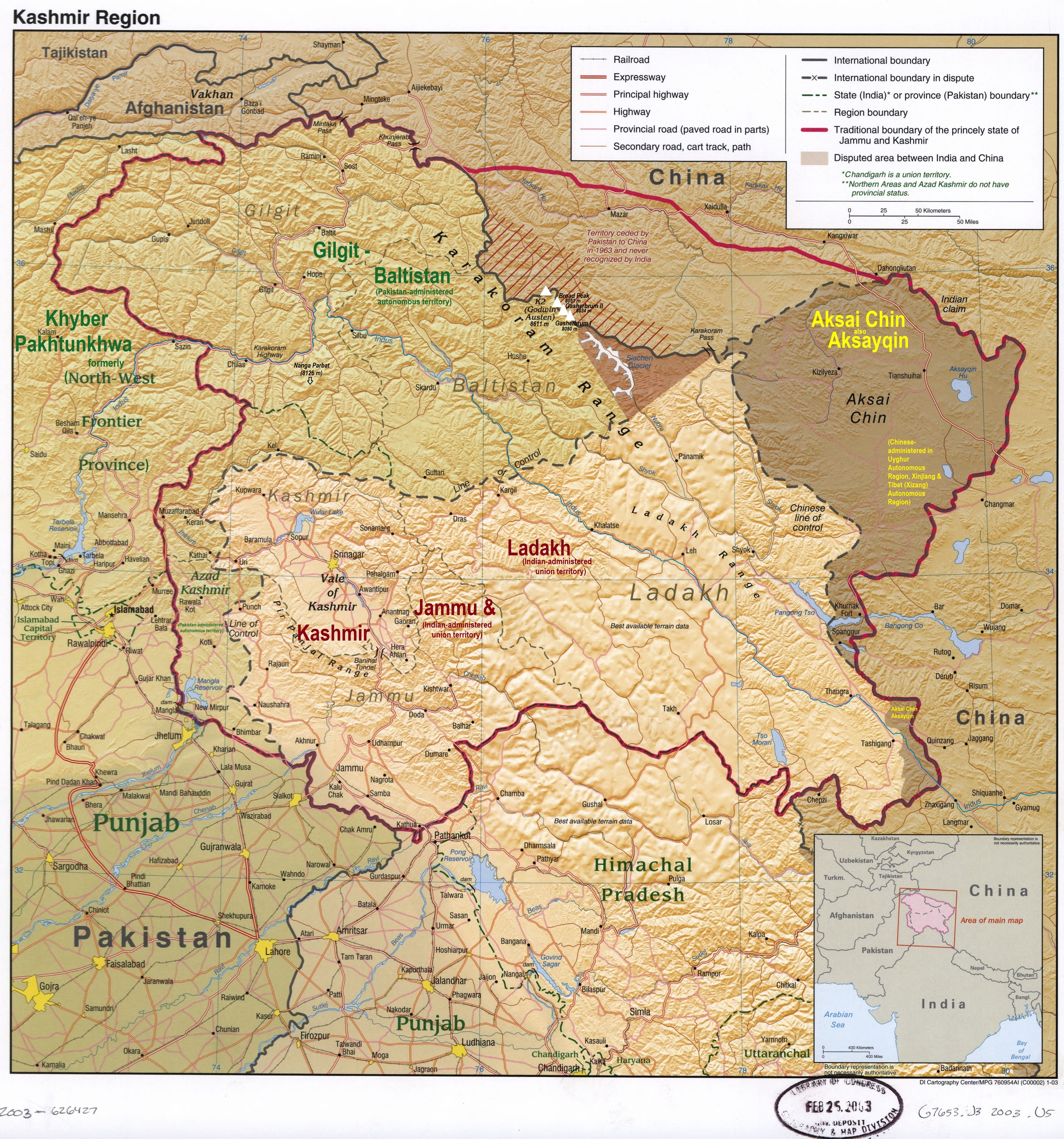
- A map showing Pakistan-administered Gilgit-Baltistan, a part of the disputed Kashmir region.
- Interactive map of Baltistan Division
- Coordinates: 35°51′N 74°44′E
- Administering country: Pakistan
- Territory: Gilgit-Baltistan
- Capital: Skardu

Government
  - Type: Divisional Administration
  - Commissioner: Kamal Khan (BPS-19 PAS)
  - Regional Police Officer: Cap. (R) Liaquat Ali Malik (BPS-20 PSP)

Baltistan Division (Urdu: بلتستان ڈویژن) is a first-order administrative division of Pakistan-administered Gilgit-Baltistan in the disputed Kashmir region. It overlaps with the historical Baltistan region, and is primarily inhabited by the Balti people.

The divisional headquarters of the Baltistan Division is the town of Skardu. Since divisions were restored in 2008, the Baltistan Division currently consists of five districts. The figures for area and population are as per the Government of Gilgit Baltistan. In brackets are the figures given by the UNOSAT. Note that UNOSAT gives the total area of Gilgit Baltistan as 70,226 km^{2} (27,114 sq mi), as opposed to the official figures of 72,496 km^{2} (27,991 sq mi).

District	Headquarters	Area (km²)	Population (2023)
Ghanche	Khaplu	8,531 [8,766]	181,610
Skardu	Skardu	10,168 [2,136]	312,875
Roundu	Dambudas	[1,895]	Included in Skardu District
Kharmang	Tolti	6,144 [6,023]	58,303
Shigar	Shigar	4,173 [8,586]	84,662
Total		29,016 [27,406]	637,450

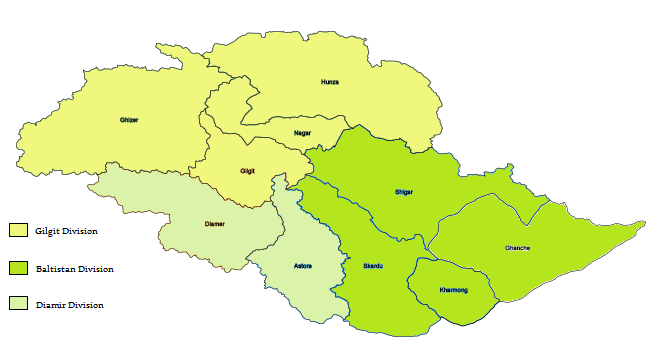
Baltistan division, in dark green, Gilgit Baltistan

== Administration ==
The Baltistan is one of three divisions of Gilgit Baltistan. The division is administrated under a commissioner of BPS-20 of Pakistan Administrative Service (PAS) group of Central Superior Services of Pakistan (CSS). The current commissioner of Baltistan Division is Kamal Khan.

== See also ==
- Skardu
