= Kachura =

Kachura (Belarusian: Качура) is a gender-neutral Ukrainian and Belarusian surname. Notable people with the surname include:

- Borys Kachura (1930–2007), Ukrainian politician
- Olga Kachura (1970–2022), Ukrainian-born Russian collaborator
- Pyotr Kachura (born 1972), Belarusian football player

== See also ==
- Alternate spelling of cachua, Peruvian folk dance
- Kachura Lakes in Pakistan
