= Pakkora =

Village in Pakistan

Pakkora is a village of the Ishkoman valley in Gilgit-Baltistan, Pakistan. It is located 95 km north west of Gilgit city. The village has a population of around 3,500 inhabitants, according to the 1998 census.

== Geography ==
Pakkora is connected to the Hunza Valley via the Naltar pass from its northeastern side while annexed to the Pamir mountain range to the northwest. The village is sandwiched between the Hindukush and the great Karakorum mountain ranges.

It has a diverse weather pattern. The climate remains moderate all year round.

== Culture and economy ==
Khowar, Shina, Burushaski, Gujri and Wakhi are the lingua franca of Pakkora. As many as 60% residents of this village are educated. There is one Inter college and two high schools. The main source of income is cultivation of wheat, corn, potatoes, and fruit. Bread and butter are also sustained by the gemstones mined from here and by government employment.
