= Shahchoi Pass =

Pakistani mountain pass

- Interactive map of Shahchoi Pass
- Elevation: 4,481 m (14,701 ft)

Location
- Location: Pakistan
- Range: Hindukush Mountains
- Coordinates: 36°20′53″N 73°41′48″E

Shahchoi pass (el. 14,700 ft.) is a high mountain pass in the Ishkoman Valley Gilgit-Baltistan in northern Pakistan. It is also called Shahchoi An.
