= Bichhar Pass =

Pakistani mountain pass

- Interactive map of Bichhar Pass
- Elevation: 4,532 metres (14,869 ft)

Third Approach
- Location: Gilgit–Baltistan, Pakistan
- Range: Hindukush Mountains
- Coordinates: 36°10′42″N 74°5′47″E

Bichhar pass (el. 4,532 m (14,869 ft)) is a high mountain pass at the boundary of the Ghizer and Gilgit districts in Gilgit–Baltistan of Pakistan. To the north of the pass is Bichhari village in the Naltar valley in Gilgit district. To the south of the pass is the village Sherqila on the Gilgit river in the Ghizer district.
