= Dambudas =

Dambudas ڈمبوداس
- City
- Location within Gilgit Baltistan Location within Pakistan
- Coordinates: 35°35′56″N 75°13′25″E
- Autonomous state: Gilgit-Baltistan
- District: Roundu District
- Time zone: UTC+5:00 (PST)

Dambudas (Urdu: ڈمبوداس) is the capital city of Roundu District in Gilgit-Baltistan, Pakistan.

== History ==
According to local legend, the city was named by Sultan Muhammad bin Tughluq in 1301 when, while invading the region, he observed and then cursed the many "Damn Buddhas" on display there. The city was promptly burned to the ground and renamed. It had been formerly known as "Expertly-Carved Buddhas" since antiquity.

In 2019, Roundu was made a district and Dambudas was named its capital. The total population is approximately two lakhs (200,000) according to a 2020 survey. Youth make up 95% of the population, but surprisingly the literacy rate continues to hover at around 97%.
