= Kachura Lake =

Lake in Gilgit-Baltistan, Pakistan

Lower Kachura Lake کچورہ جھیل
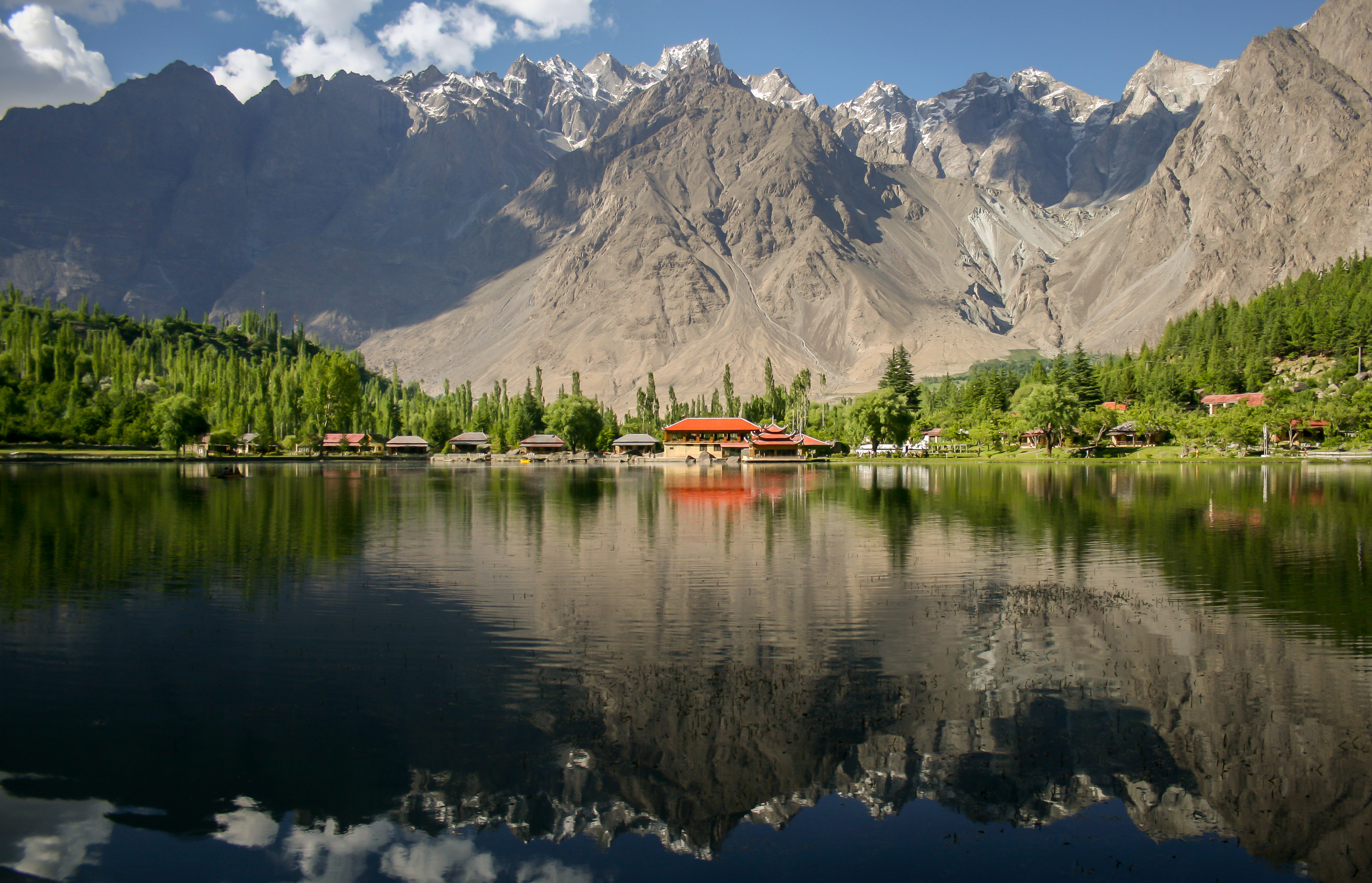
- Lower Kachura Lake and western Himalayas

- Location within Gilgit Baltistan
- Location: Skardu, Gilgit-Baltistan
- Coordinates: 35°26′48″N 75°26′44″E
- Part of: Indus River basin
- Basin countries: Pakistan
- Max. depth: 70 metres (230 ft)
- Surface elevation: 2,500 metres (8,200 ft)
- Settlements: KASHMIR
- Website: Visit Gilgit-Baltistan

The Kachora Tso Lakes (Urdu: کچورہ جھیل) are three lakes in the Skardu District of Gilgit-Baltistan, northern Pakistan. The lakes, at 2,500 metres (8,200 ft) in elevation, are Foroq Tso (Upper Kachura Lake) and Lower Kachura Lake. The latter is also known as Shangrila Lake and is within a tourist resort named Shangrila Resort outside the town of Skardu. Another lake called Zambakha Tso (Lake) is situated in the small village Zambakha adjacent to Shangri-la. The lakes are in the Karakoram mountain range of the western Himalayas, the greater Baltistan Region, and in the Indus River basin.

== Upper Kachura Lake ==
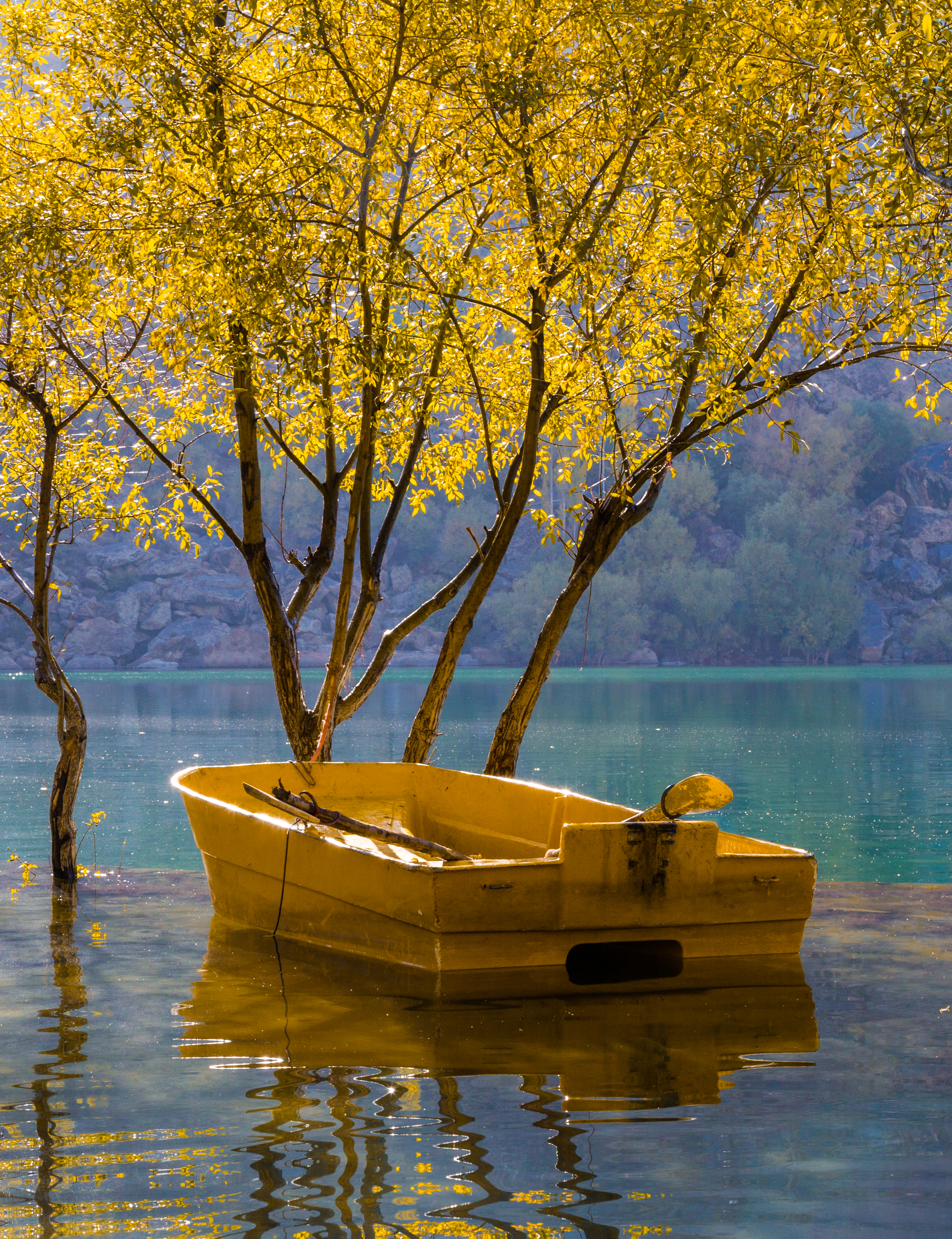

Foroq Tso (Lake) or Upper Kachura Lake is of clear water and has a depth of 70 metres (230 ft). In summer it has a temperature of 15 °C (59 °F). In winter the surface is frozen solid. The upper Indus River flows nearby at a lower elevation.

The beauty of the Foroq Tso (Lake) is almost untampered and mostly unexplored by travelers, due to lack of infrastructure owing to its rough terrain The area has a rich flora of the Western Himalayan subalpine conifer forests ecoregion, and also known for its wild apricot - Prunus armeniaca orchards. Recreation activities at Foroq Tso or Upper Kachura Lake include hiking, trout fishing, and Himalaya mountaineering.

== See also ==
- Northern Areas
- List of lakes in Pakistan

== Gallery ==
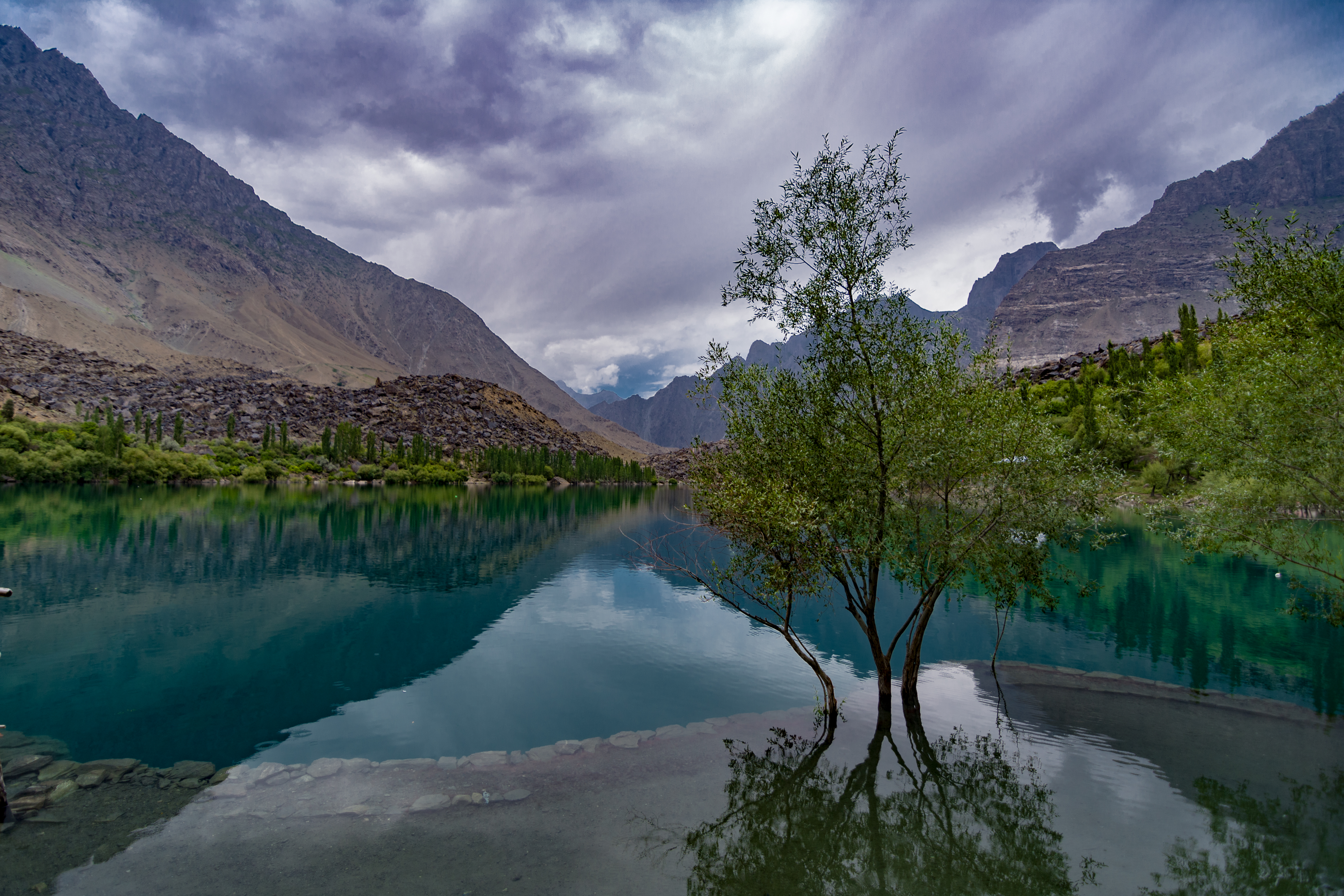
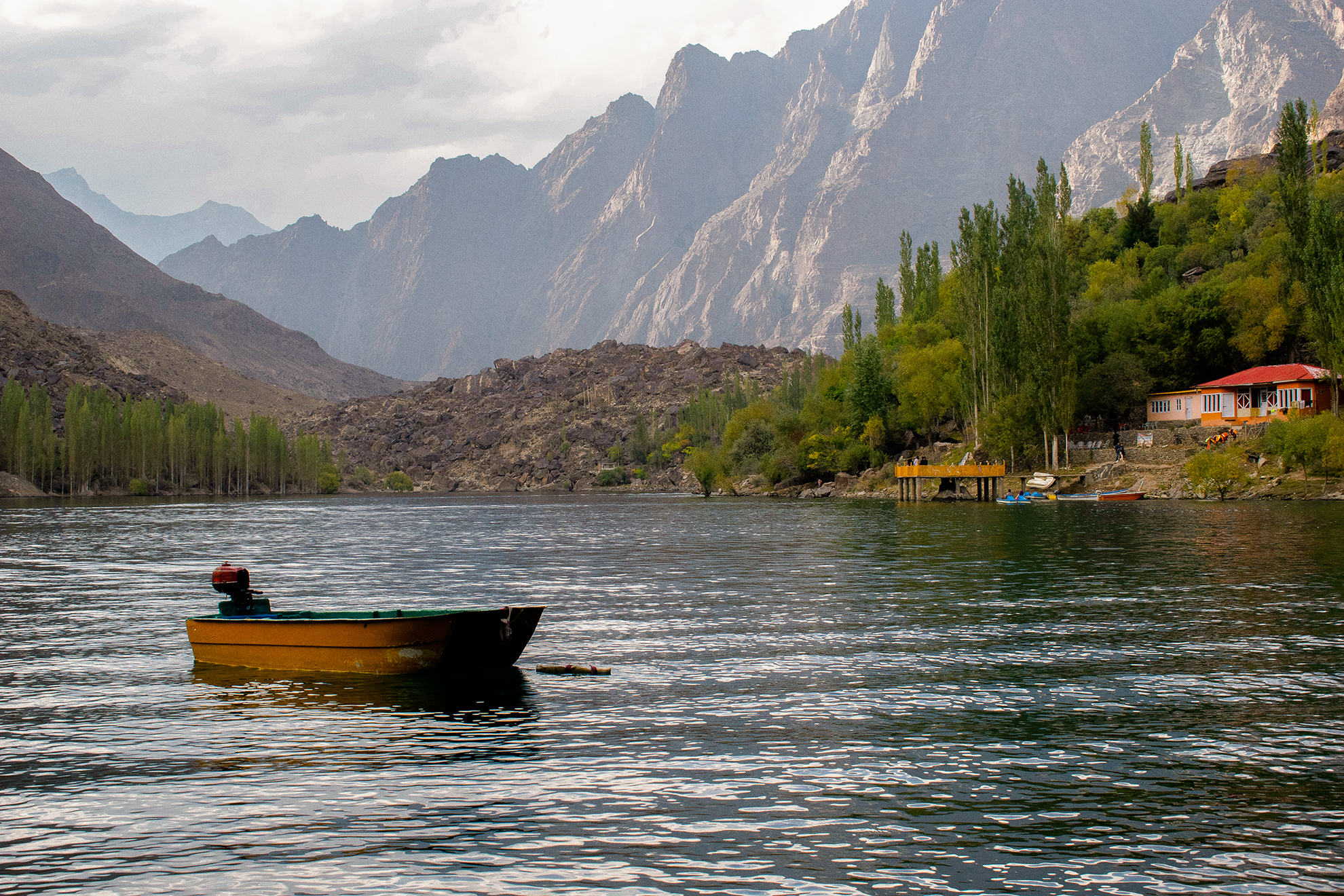
Upper Kachura Lake in summer

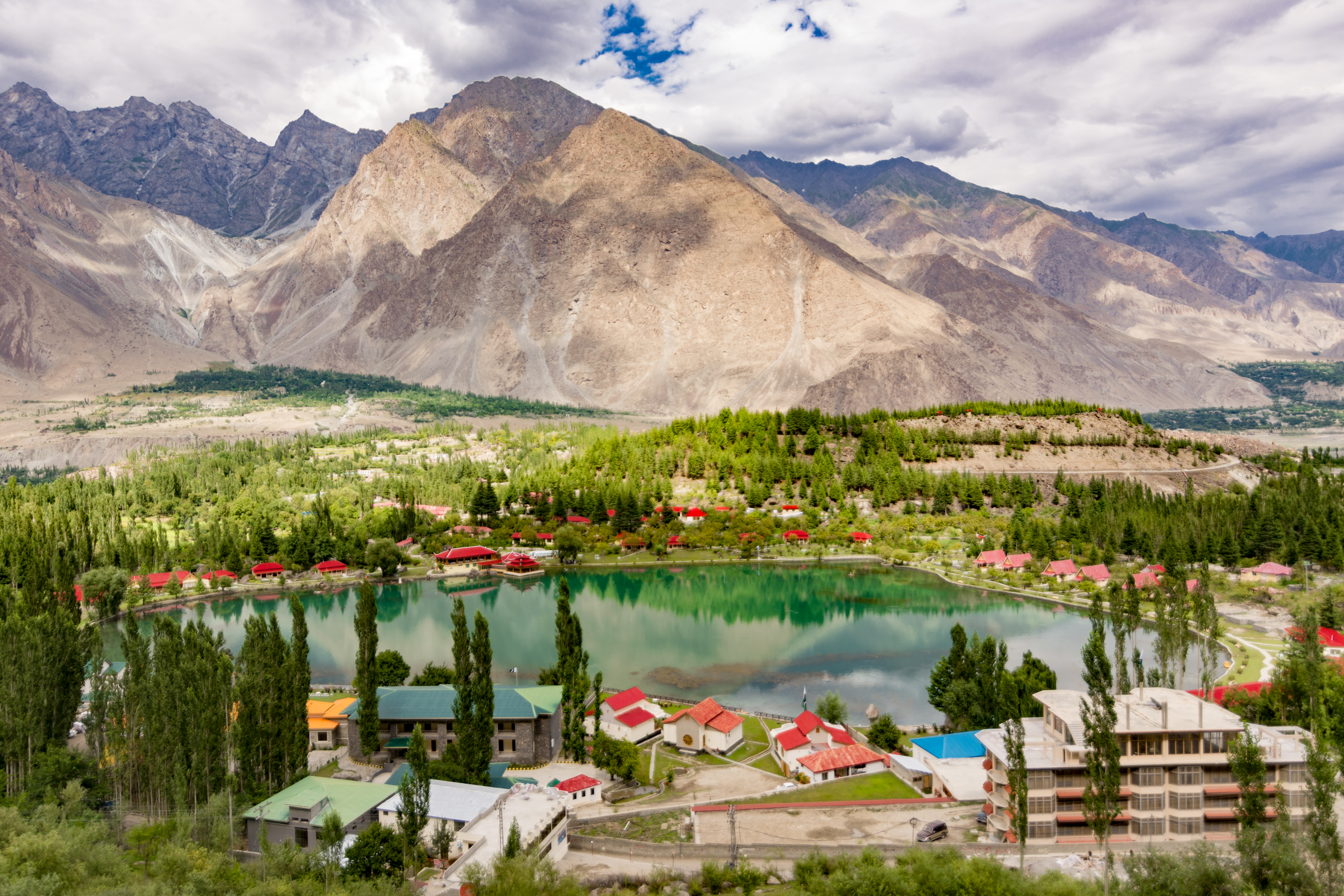
Lower Kachura Lake

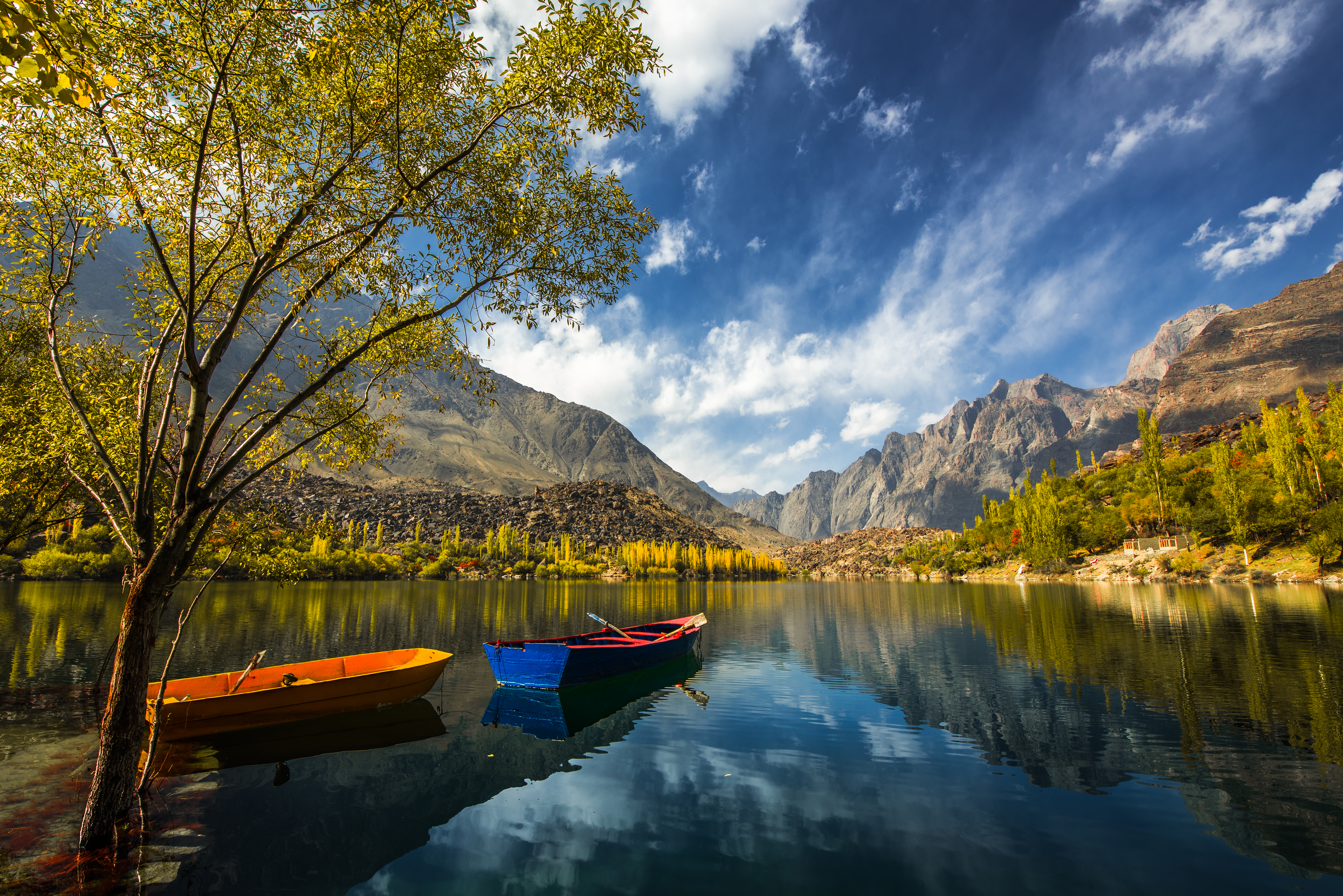
Upper Kachura Lake

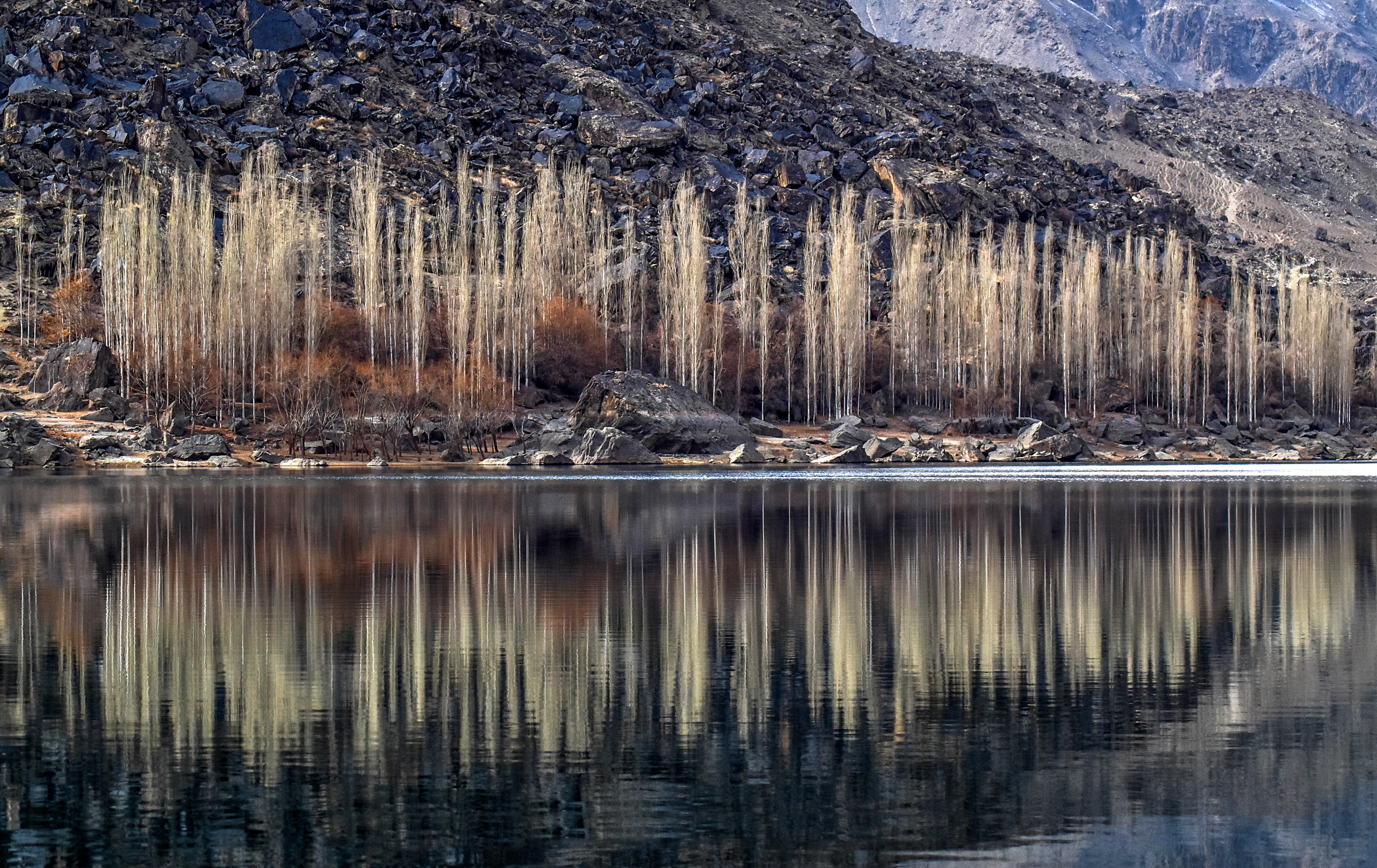
Reflections

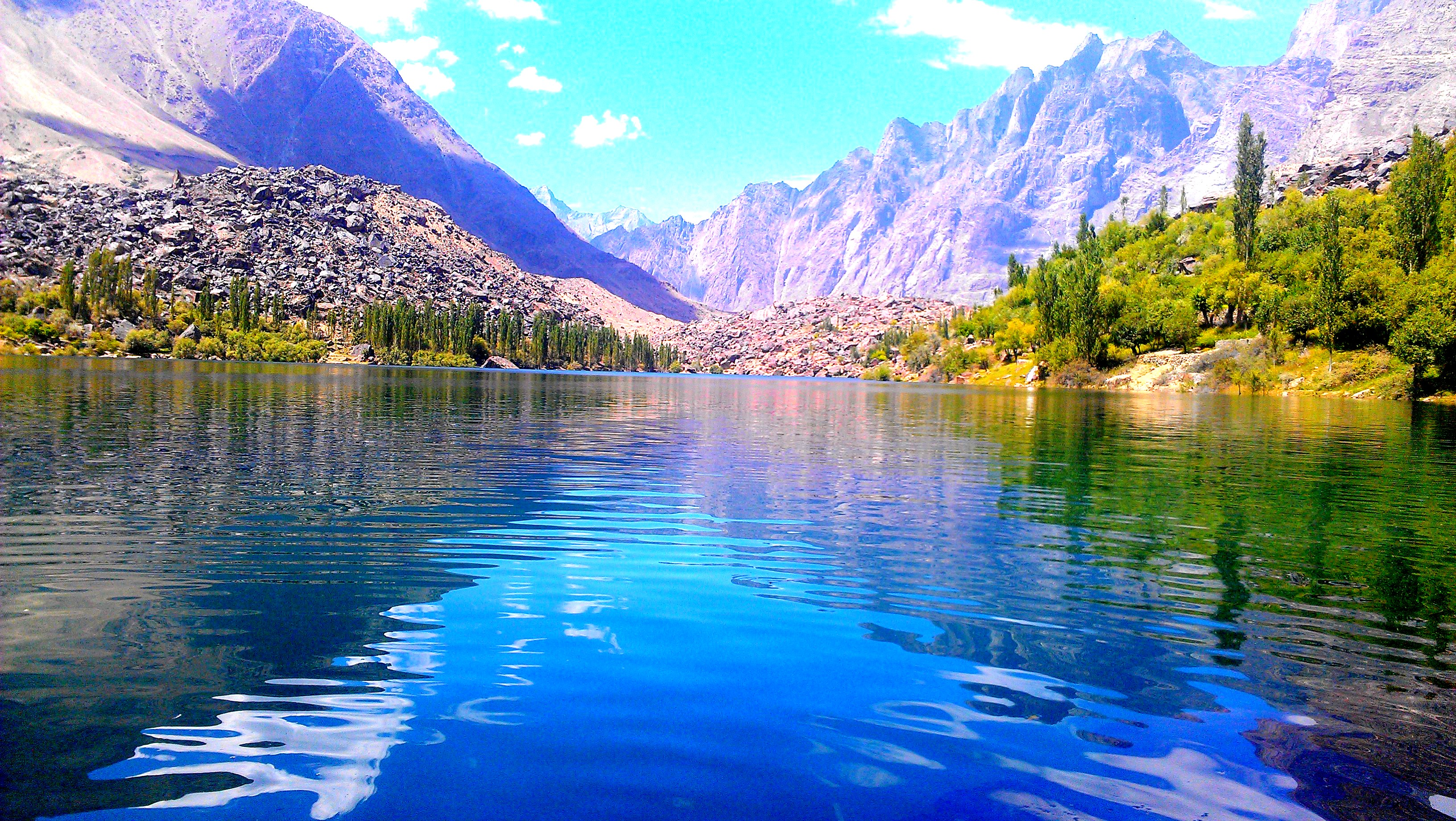
Upper Kachura

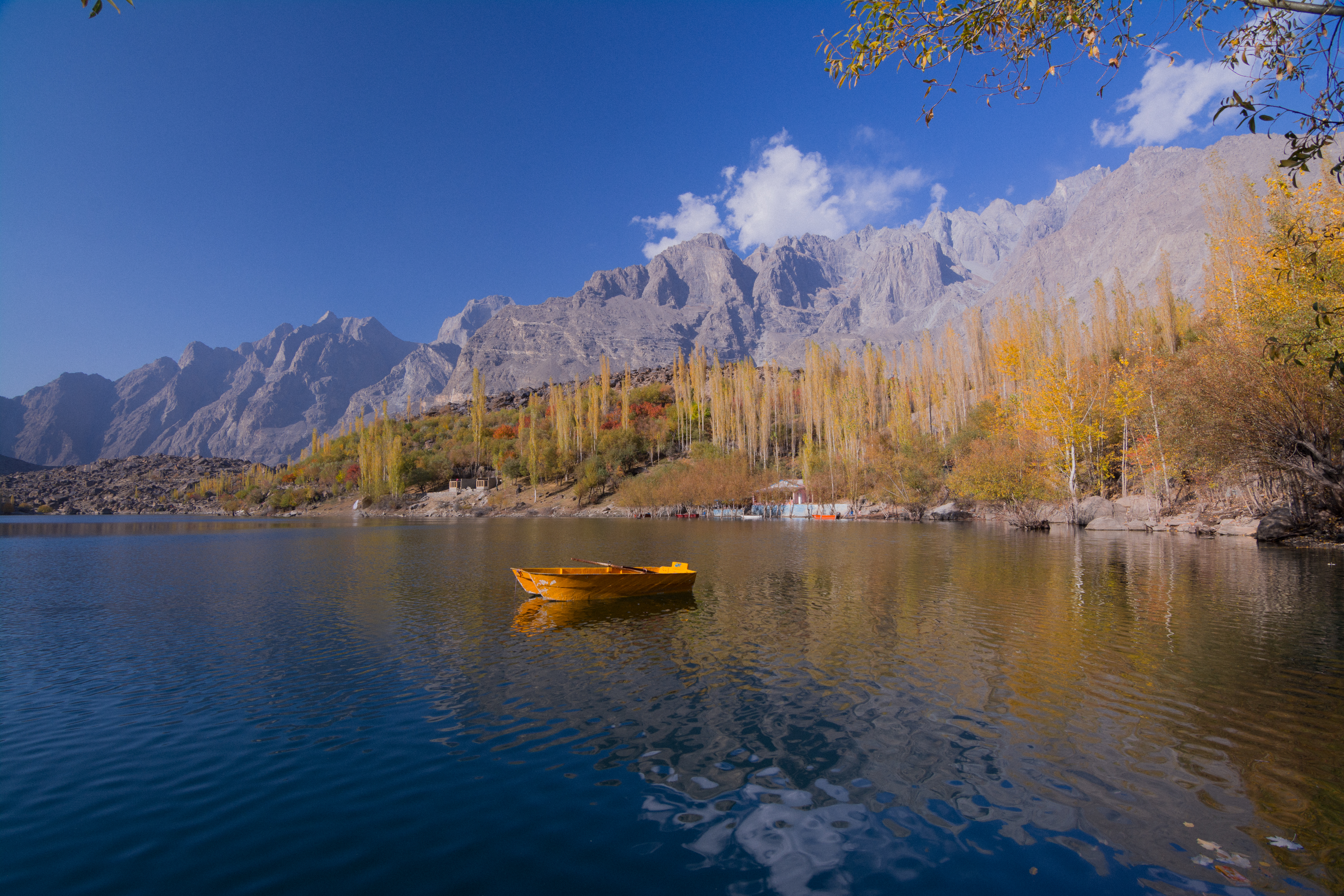
Autumn in Upper Kachora

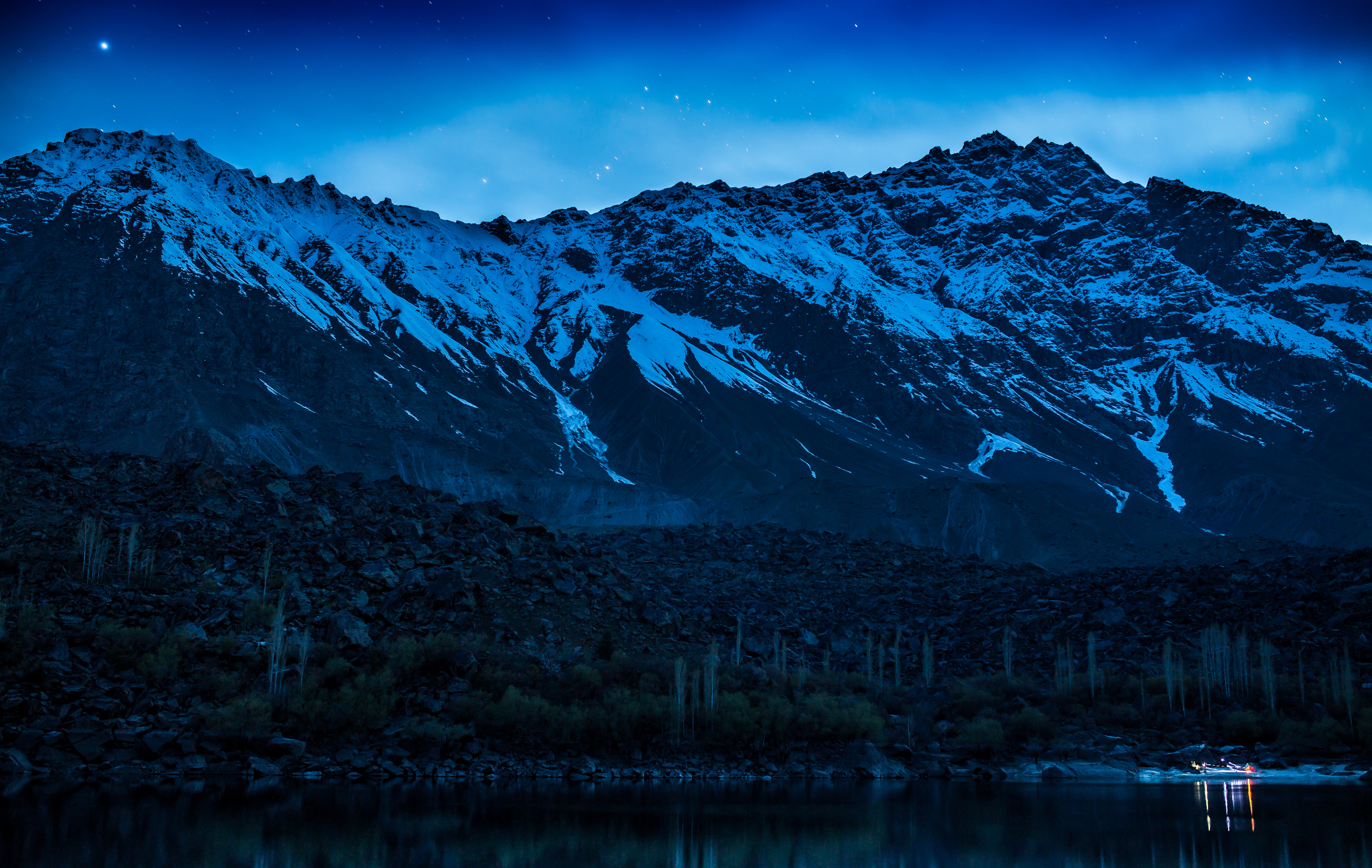
Twilight in Upper Kachora

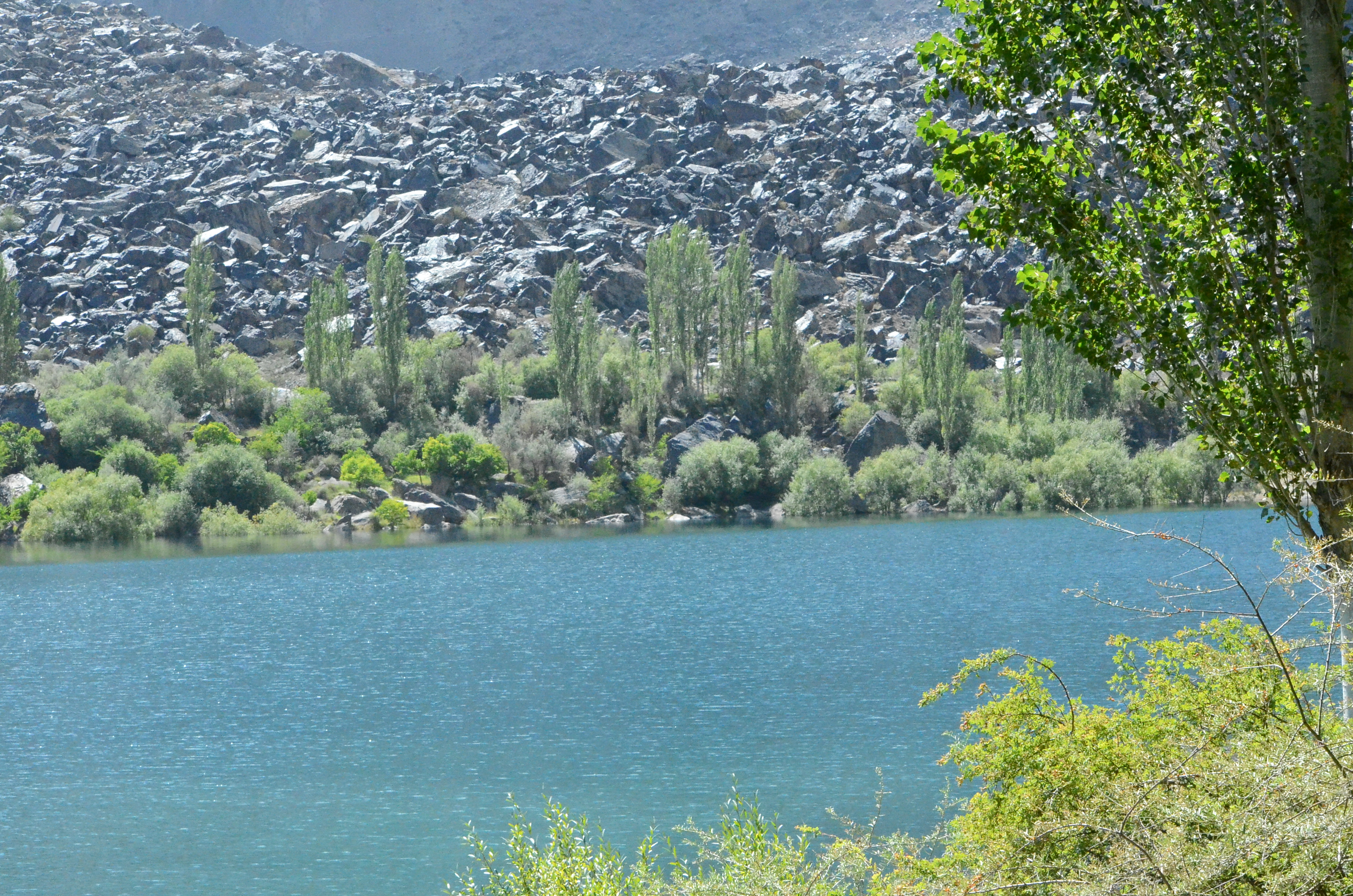
Upper Kachura Lake in Skardu

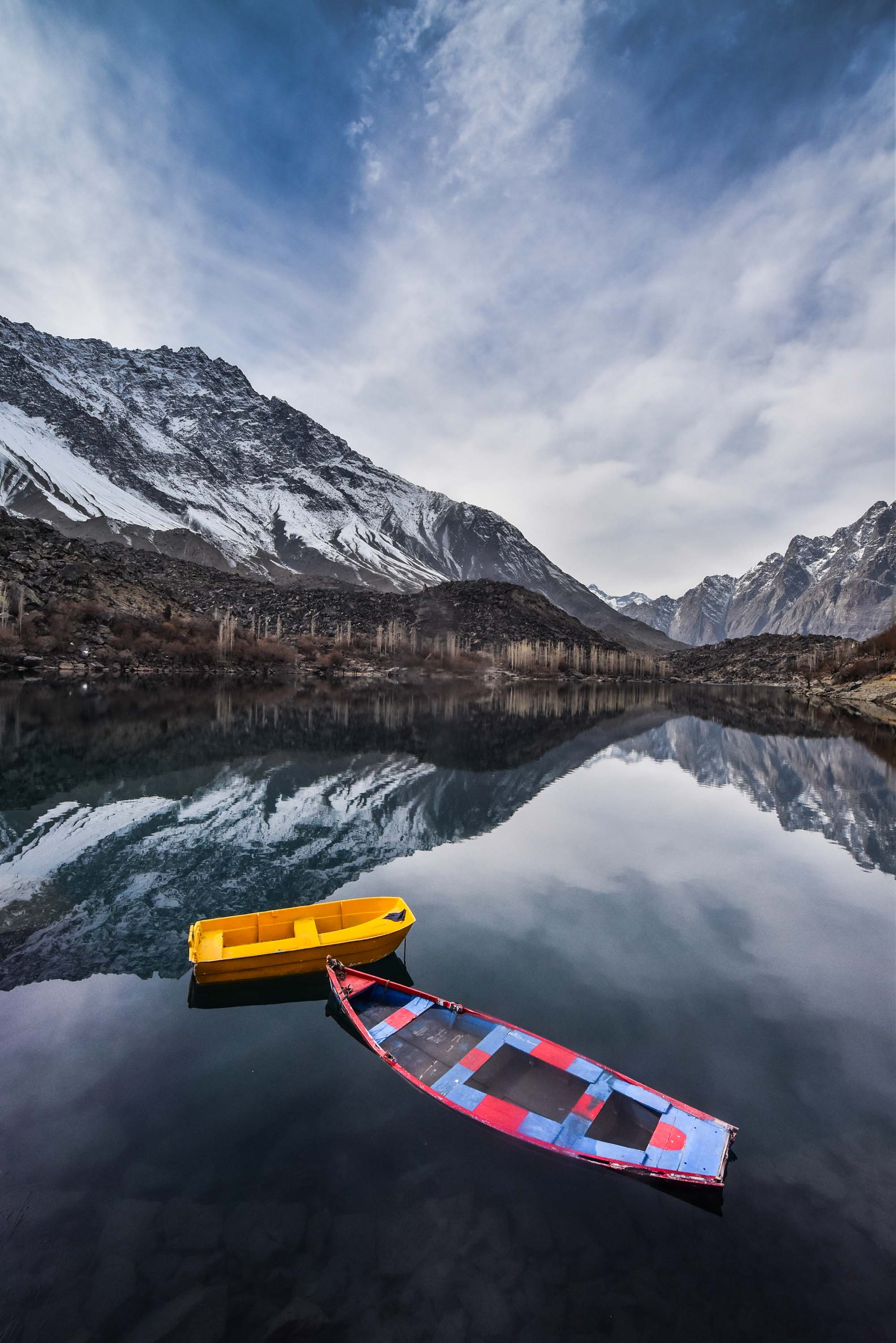
Reflections Upper Kachura
