= Skardu District =

Skardu District ضلع سکردو
- District of Gilgit-Baltistan administered by Pakistan
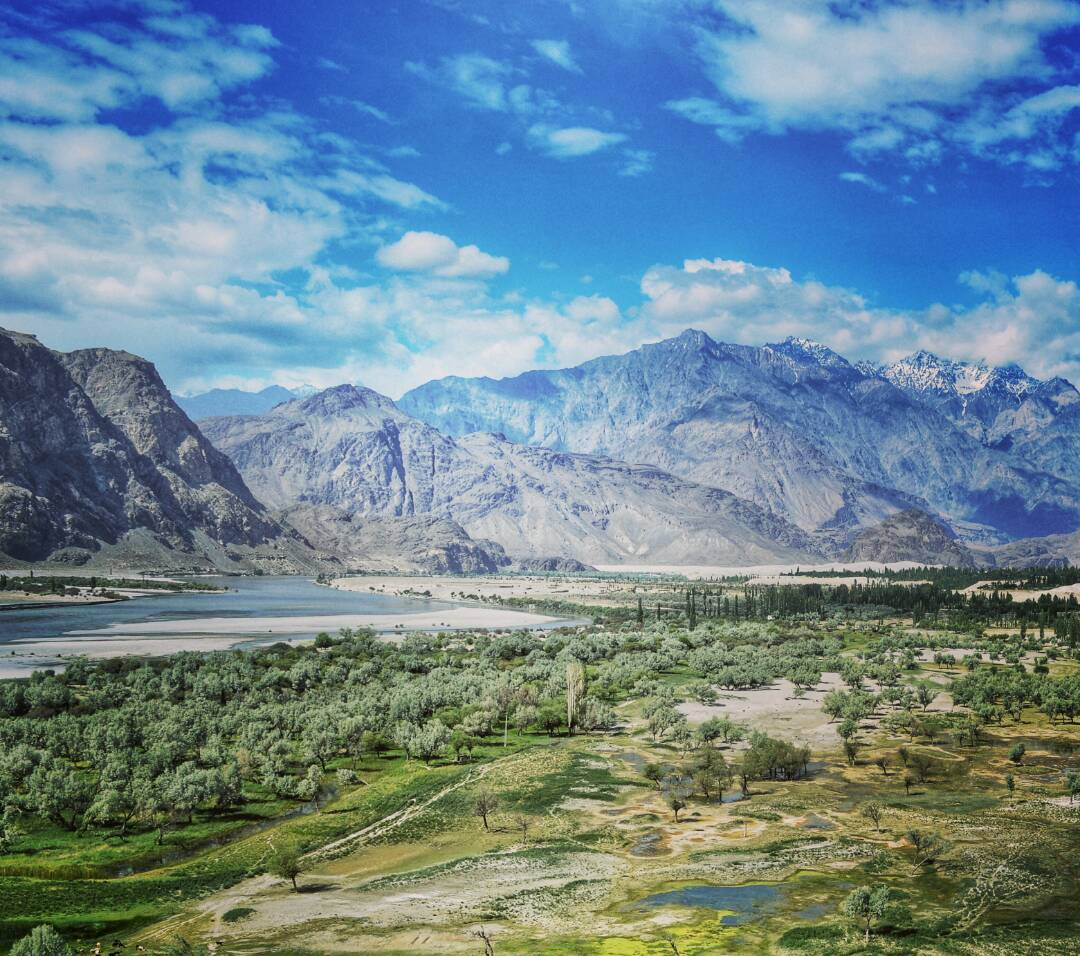
- Halma Ranga
- Interactive map of Skardu district
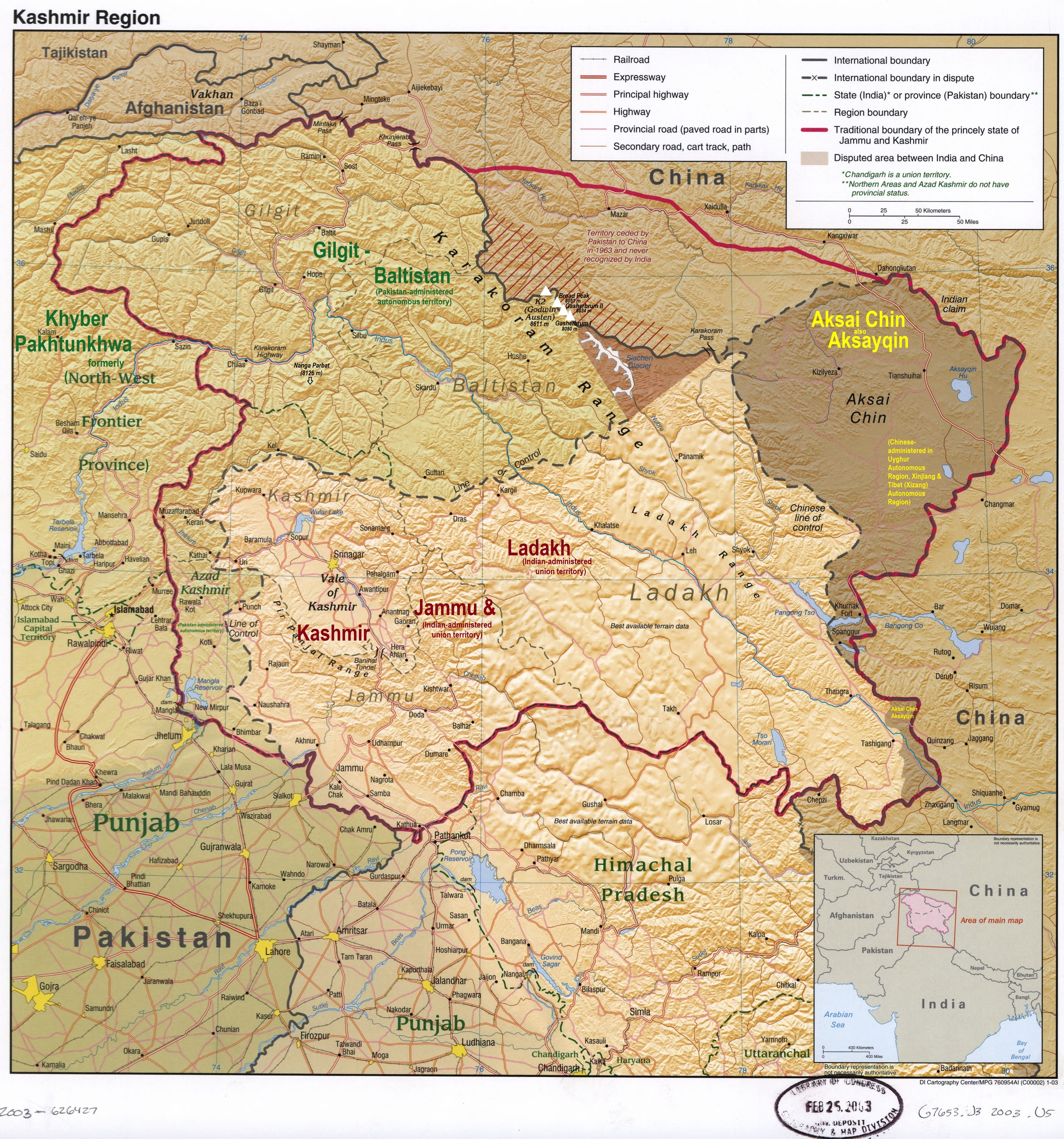
- A map showing Pakistani-administered Gilgit-Baltistan (shaded in sage green) in the disputed Kashmir region
- Coordinates: 35°17′25″N 75°38′40″E
- Administering country: Pakistan
- Territory: Gilgit-Baltistan
- Division: Baltistan Division
- Headquarters: Skardu

Government
  - Type: District Administration
  - Deputy Commissioner: Karimdad Chugtai (PAS)
  - District Police Officer: Hassan Ali (PSP)
  - District Health Officer: N/A

Area
  - Total: 10,168 km^{2} (3,926 sq mi)

Population (2023)
  - Total: 278,885
- Number of tehsils: 4

The Skardu District (Urdu: ضلع سکردو) is a district of Pakistan-administered Gilgit-Baltistan in the disputed Kashmir region. The district headquarters is the town of Skardu, which is also the headquarters of Baltistan Division.

== Geography ==
Skardu District is bounded on the east by the Ghanche District, on the south by the Kharmang District, on the west by the Astore District, on the north-west by the Gilgit District and on the north by the Shigar District.

Map of Gilgit–Baltistan with the Skardu District highlighted in red

=== Mountain peaks and glaciers ===
The highest peak in Skardu District is K2 (8,611 m), which is the highest peak in Pakistan and the second-highest in the world. The Baltoro Muztagh, the subrange of the Karakoram Mountains that includes the mighty peaks of K2 (8,611 m), Broad Peak (8,047 m), the Gasherbrums (8,000+ m), and Masherbrum (7,821 m), is located in Skardu District. Askole is the last settlement in the district for all treks to Concordia (the confluence of the Baltoro Glacier and the Godwin-Austen Glacier). The Biafo Glacier and a major part of the Hispar Glacier are also located in Skardu District. Overall, 27% of the district consists of alpine and winter pastures, and 71% is either barren or permanently snow covered.

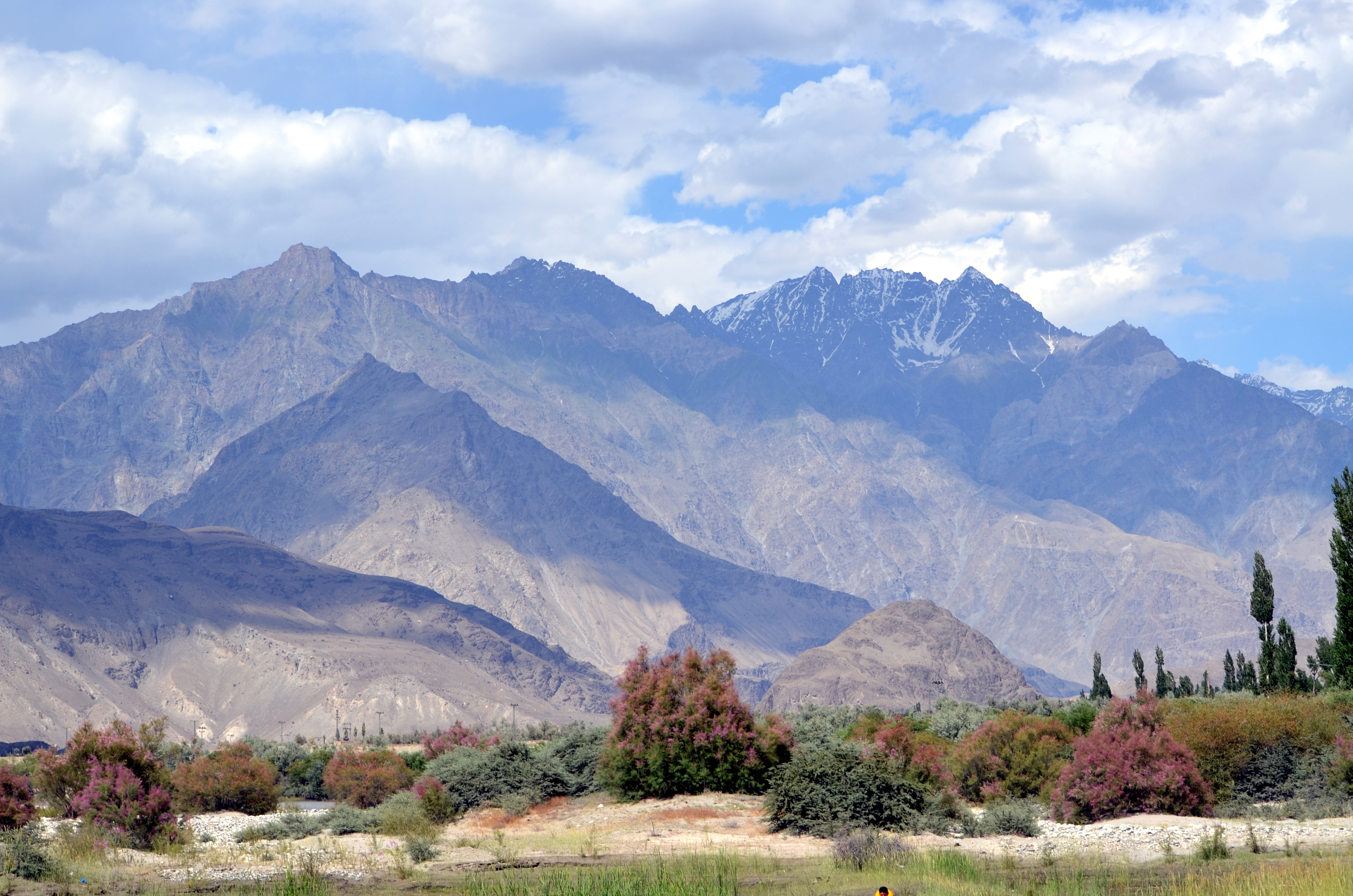
View of the Karakoram Mountains

=== Deosai National Park ===
The Deosai Plateau, which is one of the highest plateaus in the world, falls under the jurisdiction of Skardu District. For centuries the people of Skardu including Sadpara village, and Yultar Area (Newranga, Astana, Kushmara, Fapa, Kharpito etc) have used Deosai as pasture land in summers for grazing their domesticated animals. The Deosai Plateau is the second- highest plateau in the world, after the Tibetan Plateau. Famous places in the Deosai National Park are, Chogo Chu (Bara Pani), Naqpo Chu (Kala Pani), Shatong Nala, Sheosar Tso (lake).

=== Lakes ===
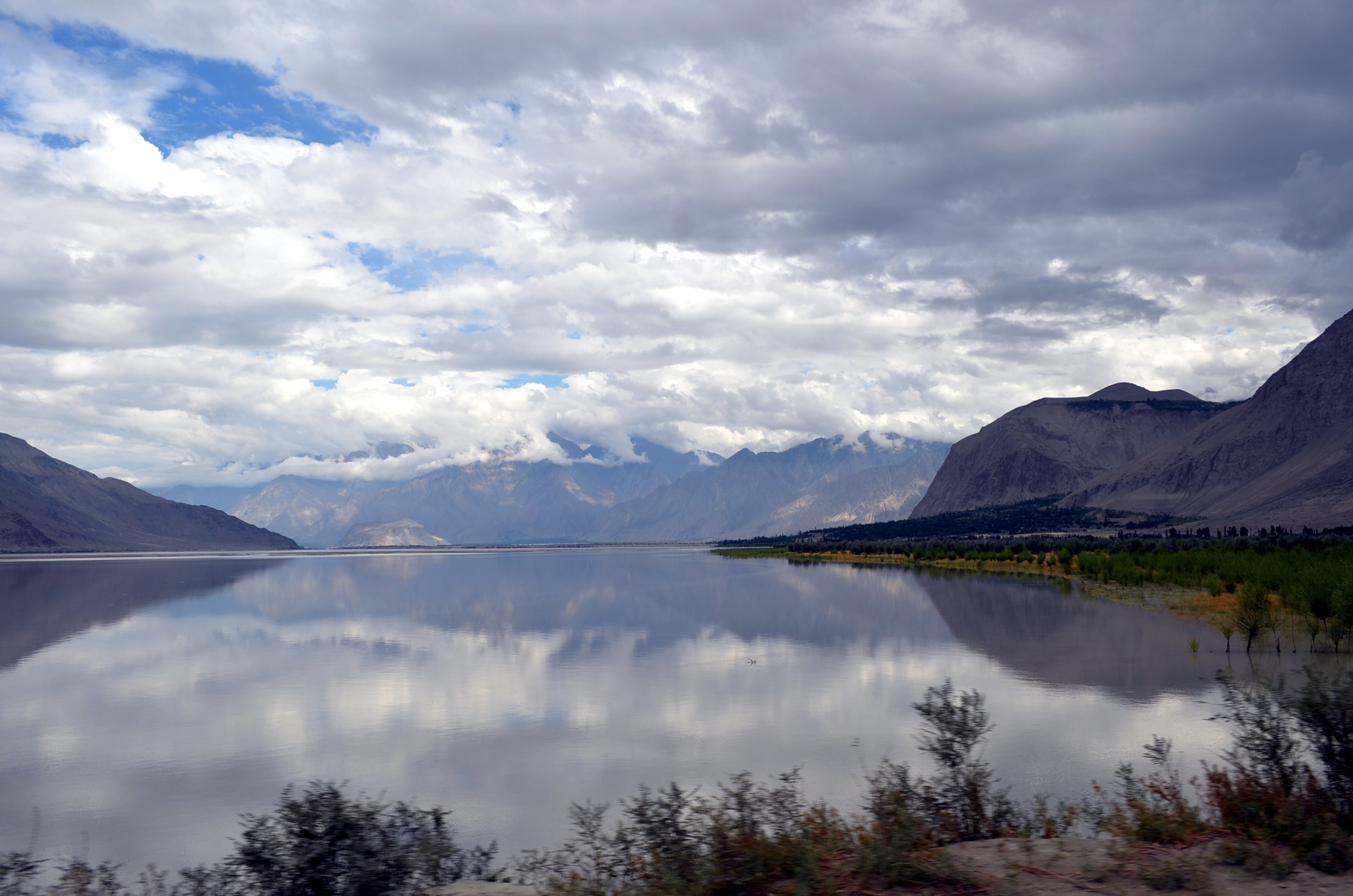
A view of the Indus River in Skardu District

The main lakes in the district are:

- Foroq Tso (Kachura Lake)
- Sadpar Tso (Satpara Lake)
- Kachura Tso (Shangrila Lake)
- Sheosar Tso (Sheosar Lake)

=== Mountain passes ===
The Gondogoro Pass and Burgy La (Burgy Pass) are located in Skardu District.

== History ==
Skardu District largely overlaps with the Skardu Valley section of larger Indus Valley and Deosai Plains. The Maqpon dynasty got established in Skardu near the end of 14th century. Maqpon Bokha founded the town of Skardu in early 1500s. Afterwards it remained under the control of Maqpons until the Dogra invasion of Baltistan in 1840. In the princely state of Jammu and Kashmir, established under British suzerainty in 1846, Skardu was one of the three tehsils of Ladakh Wazarat along with Leh and Kargil, with Skardu Tehsil roughly corresponding to present-day Baltistan Division. After 1947 Gilgit Rebellion and Pakistani victory in the siege of Skardu, it became a part of Pakistan. Skardu was set up as an independent agency, Baltistan Agency, which was later merged with Gilgit Agency to create Northern Areas in 1972, the same year Skardu District was established. In 1989 Ghanche District was separated from it, followed by Shigar and Kharmang in 2015.

== Education ==
According to the Alif Ailaan Pakistan District Education Rankings 2015, Skardu District is ranked 14th out of 148 districts of Pakistan in terms of education. For facilities and infrastructure, the district is ranked 89th out of 148 districts.

== Major towns ==
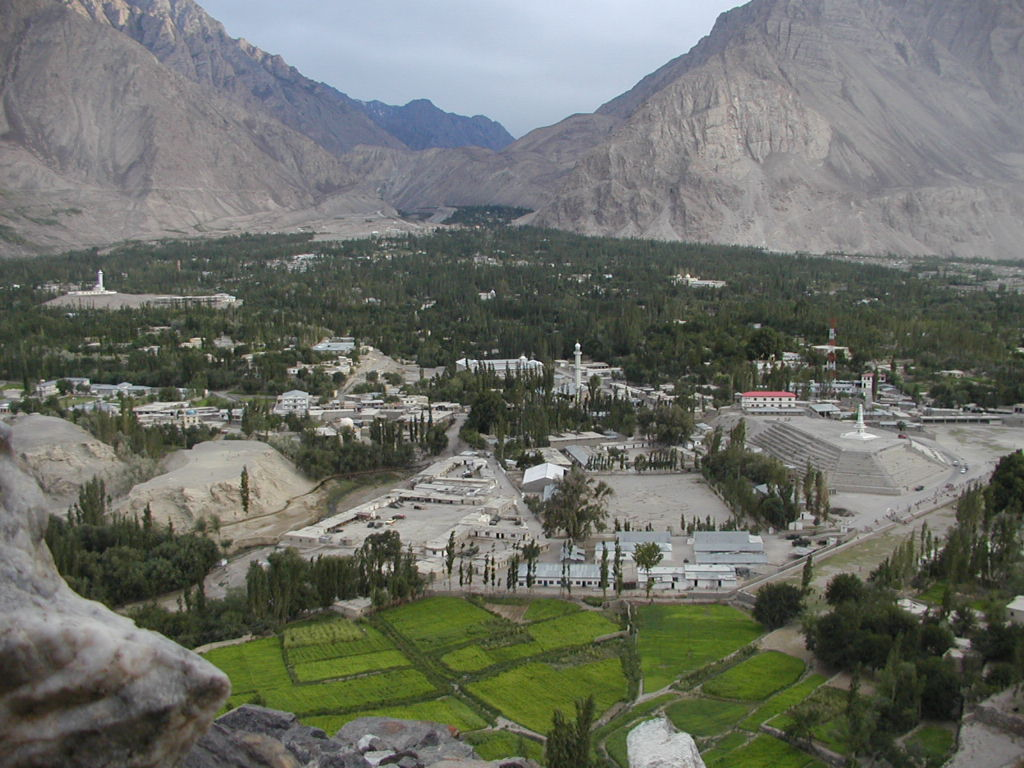
The town of Skardu as seen from the Skardu Fort

The major towns of Skardu District are: Newranga, Roundu, Hussainabad, Sadpara, Gamba, Kowardo, Qomrah, Sermik, Chunda, Tandal, Thorgu, Narh, Gol, Koshmara, Atana, Rgya Yul, Sondus, Kharpito, Fapa, Katpana, Shagharthang, Sok, Hoto, Shilla, Shigari Bala, Basho, Kachura and Skardu town areas including Olding, Khargrong, Sakmaidan, Yultar, Haji Gam, Hassan Colony, Manthal, and Chumik.

== Demographics ==
People of Skardu District are predominantly of the Shia sect of Islam, where 97% of the people are of the Shia sect, 2% are of the Noorbakshi sect, and 1% of the Sunni sect.

== See also ==
- Geography of Gilgit–Baltistan
