= Gahkuch =

City in Pakistan-administered Gilgit-Baltistan

Gahkuch گاہکوچ
- City
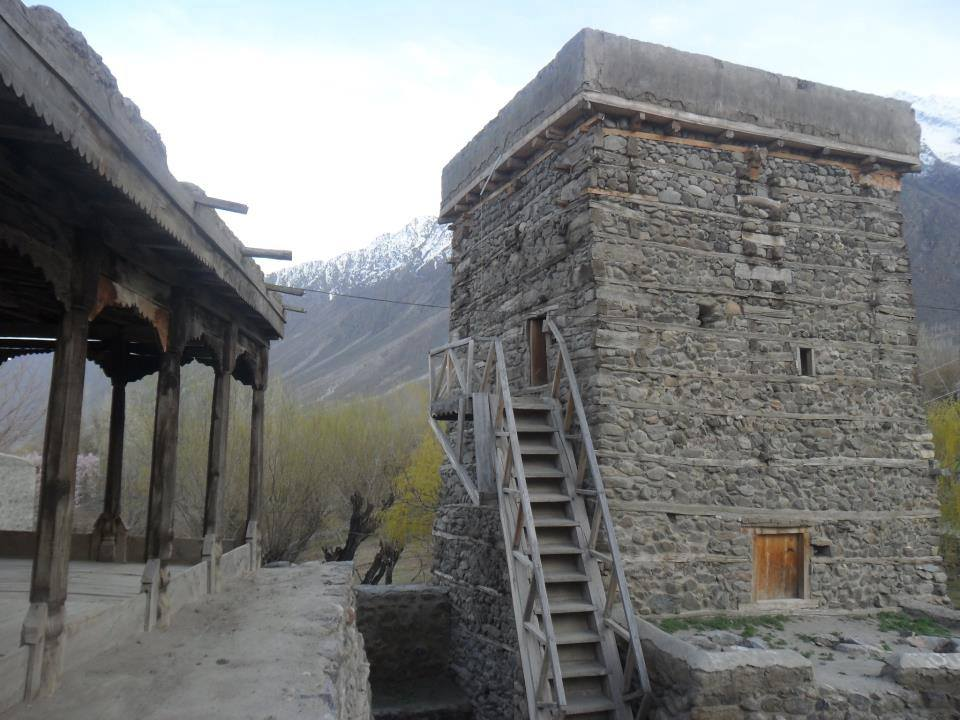
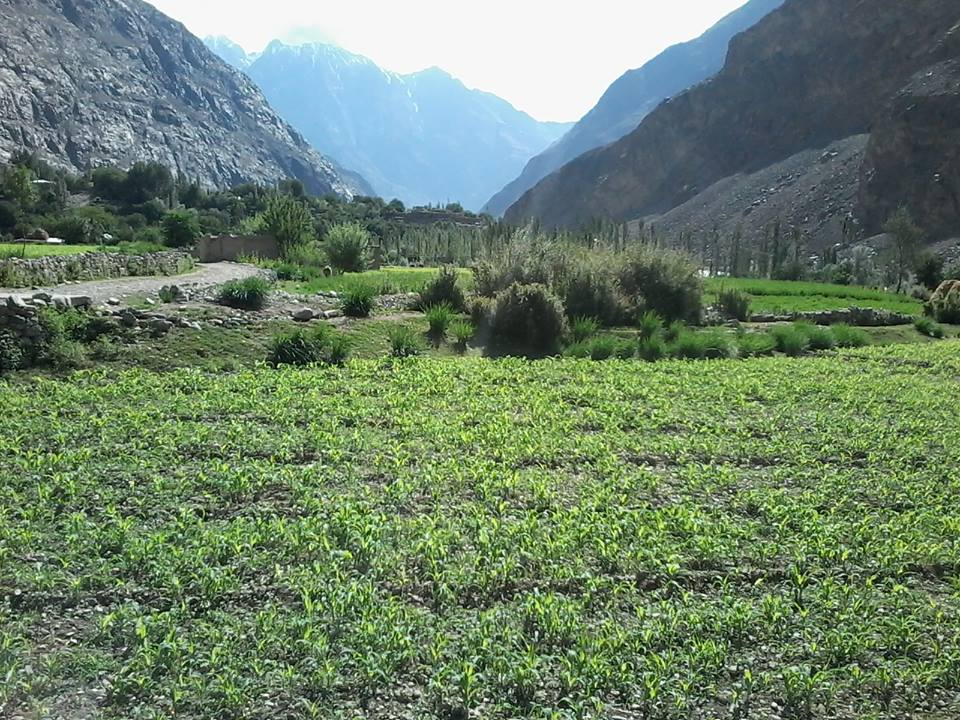
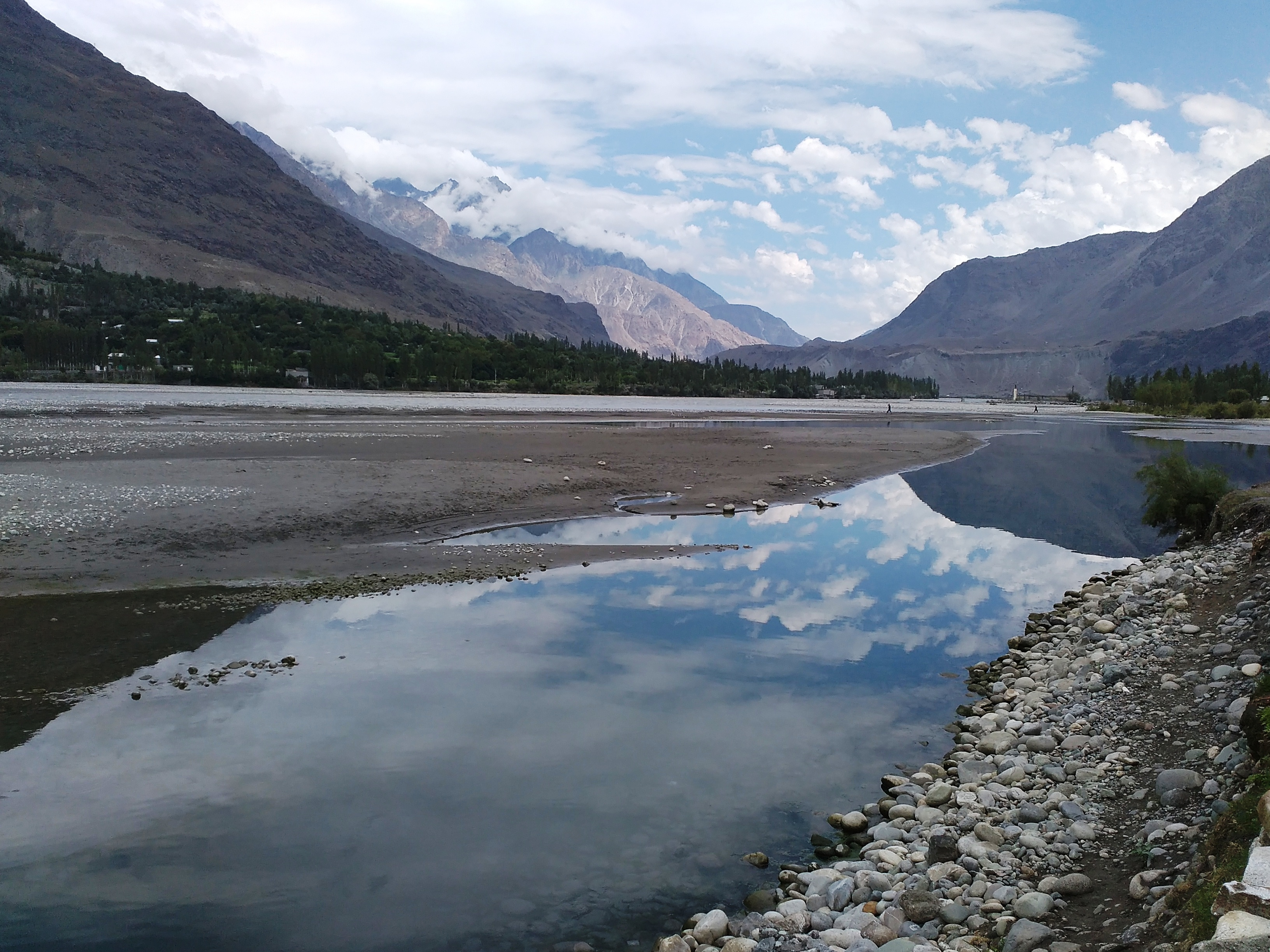
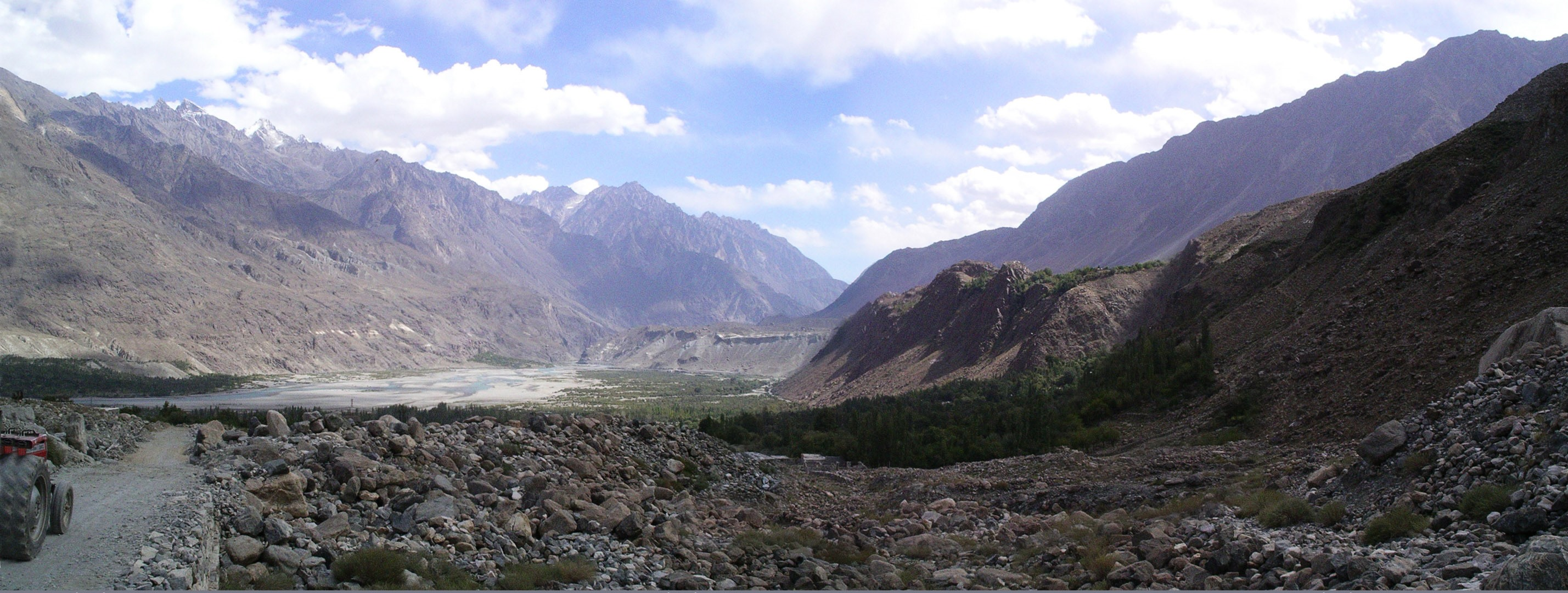
- Top left to right: Gahkuch Fort, Sumal Valley, River Ghizer and Gahkuch Valley

- Location within Gilgit Baltistan Location within Pakistan
- Coordinates: 36°10′25″N 73°46′00″E
- Administering country: Pakistan
- Administrative unit: Gilgit–Baltistan
- District: Ghizer District
- Elevation: 1,899 m (6,230 ft)

Population (1998)
  - Total: 10,142
- Time zone: UTC+05:00 (Pakistan Standard Time)

Gahkuch (Urdu: گاہکوچ) is the capital city of Ghizer District in Pakistan-administered Gilgit-Baltistan, in the disputed Kashmir region. Surrounded by mountains, it lies 72 kilometers northwest of Gilgit, the capital of the Gilgit-Baltistan region.

The city lies on the way to Ishkoman. 1998 Pakistani census recorded the population of Gahkuch as 10,142.
