= Ghizer District =

Ghizer District ضلع غذر
- District of Gilgit-Baltistan administered by Pakistan
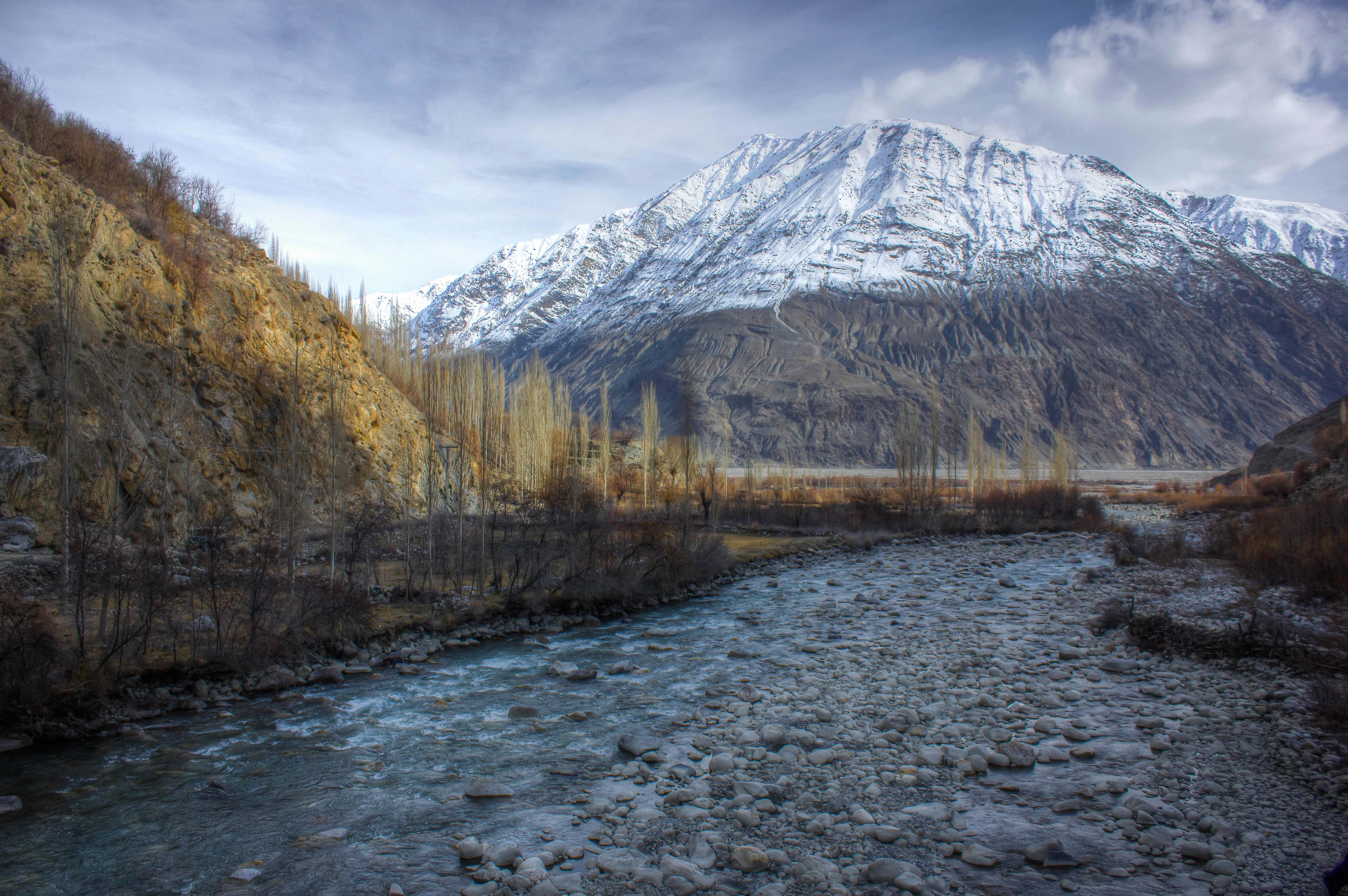
- Ishkoman Valley

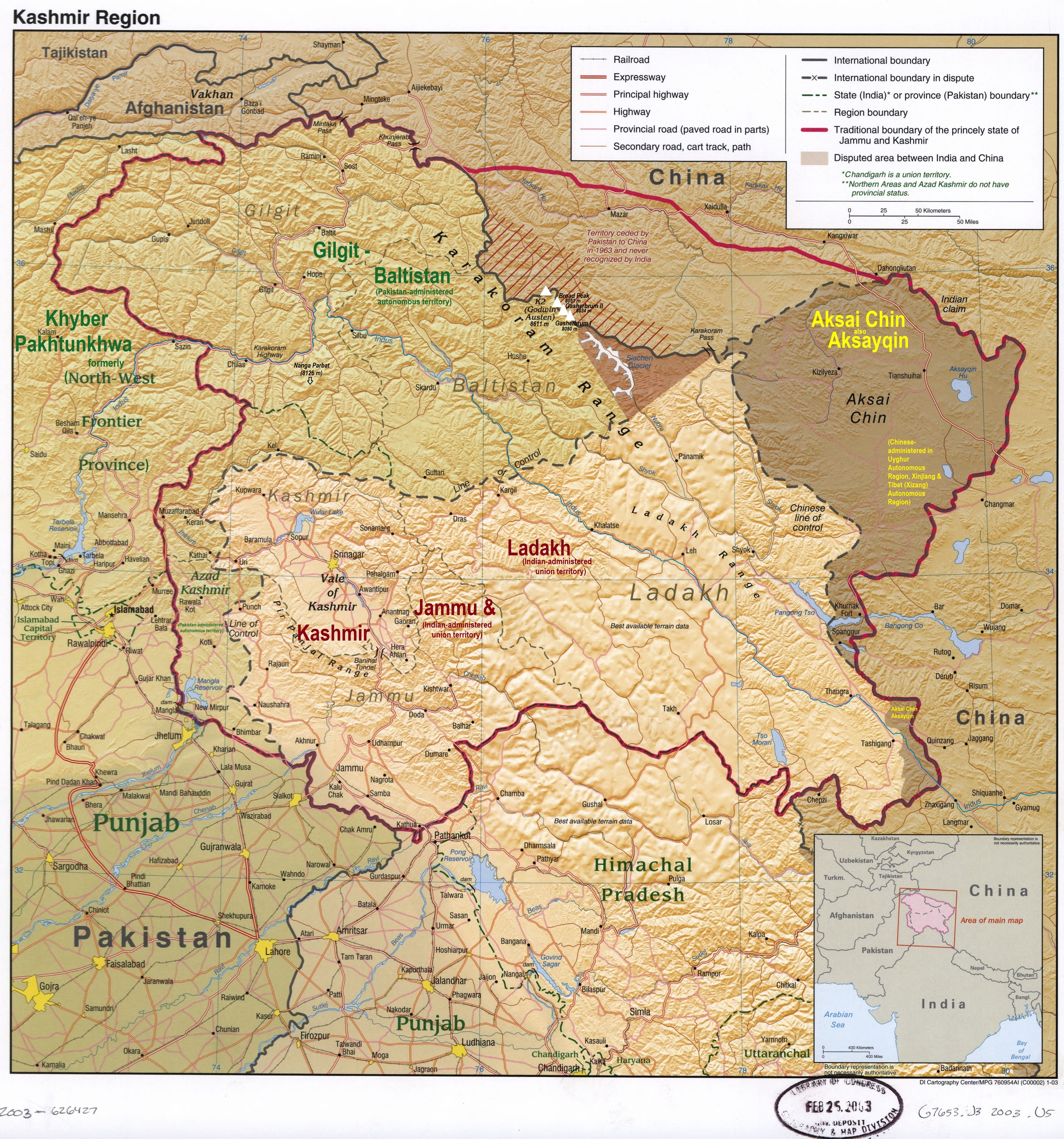
- A map showing Pakistani-administered Gilgit-Baltistan (shaded in sage green) in the disputed Kashmir region
- Interactive map of Ghizer District
- Coordinates (Gahkuch): 36°10′25″N 73°46′0″E
- Administering country: Pakistan
- Territory: Gilgit-Baltistan
- Division: Gilgit Division
- Headquarters: Gahkuch

Government
  - Type: District Administration
  - Deputy Commissioner: N/A
  - District Police Officer: N/A
  - District Health Officer: N/A

Area
  - Total: 12,381 km^{2} (4,780 sq mi)

Population (2023)
  - Total: 200,069
  - Density: 16.159/km^{2} (41.853/sq mi)
- Number of tehsils: 2

Ghizer District (Urdu: ضلع غذر) is a district of the Pakistan-administered Gilgit-Baltistan region in the disputed Kashmir region. Less than 13.5% of the district consists of alpine pastures, with over 83% of remaining area being barren or permanently snow covered.

== Geography ==
The Ghizer District is bounded on the north by the Upper Chitral District of Khyber Pakhtunkhwa Province and the Wakhan District of Afghanistan's Badakhshan Province, on the east by the Hunza District, the Nagar District, and the Gilgit District.

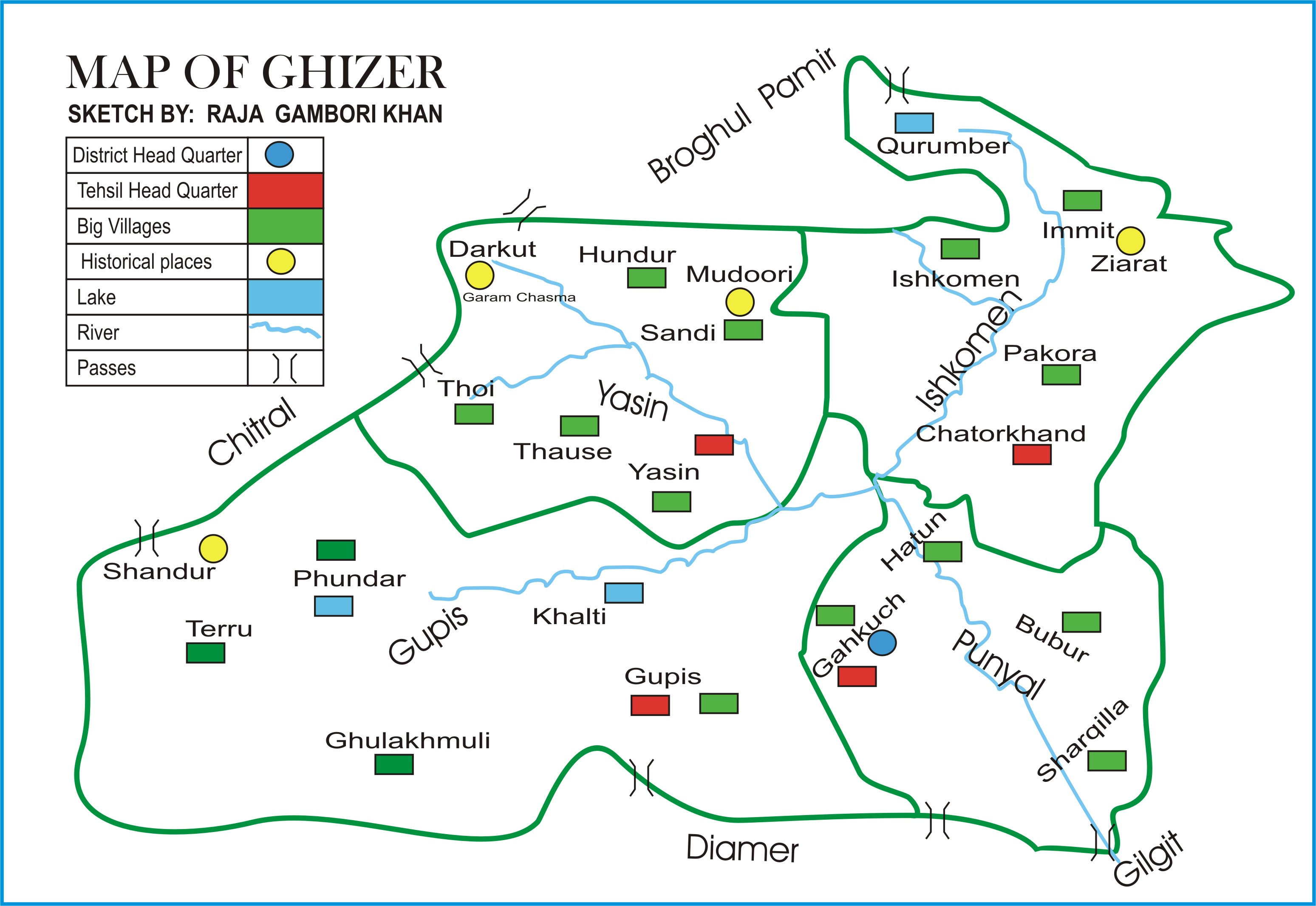
Map of the Ghizer District

The highest peak of Ghizer District is Koyo Zom (6,871 m) in Hindu Kush Range range, which lies on the boundary between Ghizer District and Chitral.

Some of the main places in the district are Koh-i-Ghizer, Ishkoman and Yasin valleys. Other places include Gupis, Chatorkhand, Imit, Pingal, Shahmaran and Utz.

Some of the passes in the district are:

- Bichhar Pass (on the boundary of Ghizer and Gilgit Districts)
- Chillingi Pass
- Hayal Pass and Naltar Pass (on the boundary of Ghizer and Gilgit Districts)
- Kalandar Pass
- Thui Pass between Yasin and Yarkhun Valley
- Darkot Pass that connects Broghil Valley to Yasin in the Ghizer Valley

There are several more Passes like Attar Pass, Punji Pass, Korumbar Pass, Assumbar Pass, Chumakhand Pass, Nazbar and Zagar Passes they connect Mastuj to Ghizer Valley. These are trekking routes with camping sites and views of the Hindukush and Hindu Raj Mountains.

The main river in the district is the Gilgit River. The other tributaries include the Qurumbar River, Phakora River, Hayal River, Singul River and Yasin River, Phander River tributary which also joins the main stream at different points.

== Administration ==
The present Ghizer District consists of four tehsils:

- Ishkoman Tehsil
- Punial Tehsil
- Yasin Tehsil
- Gupis Tehsil

The district headquarters is the town of Gahkuch. The former Ghizer District that existed from 1974 to 2019 spanned the entire upper Gilgit River Valley (also known as the Ghizer River Valley). In 2019, the former district was announced to have been divided into the Gupis-Yasin District in the west and the present, smaller Ghizer District in the east. However, as of 2024, it has not yet been established.

== Education ==
According to the Alif Ailaan Pakistan District Education Rankings of 2015, Ghizer was ranked 10 out of 148 districts in terms of education. For facilities and infrastructure, the district was ranked 17 out of 148. The biggest contribution in the region in education is "Aga Khan Education Service Pakistan"(AKESP).
