= Ishkoman Valley =

Valley in Gilgit-Baltistan, Pakistan

Ishkoman Valley اشکومن (Urdu) Ṣ̌qəmən (Wakhi)
- Ishkoman
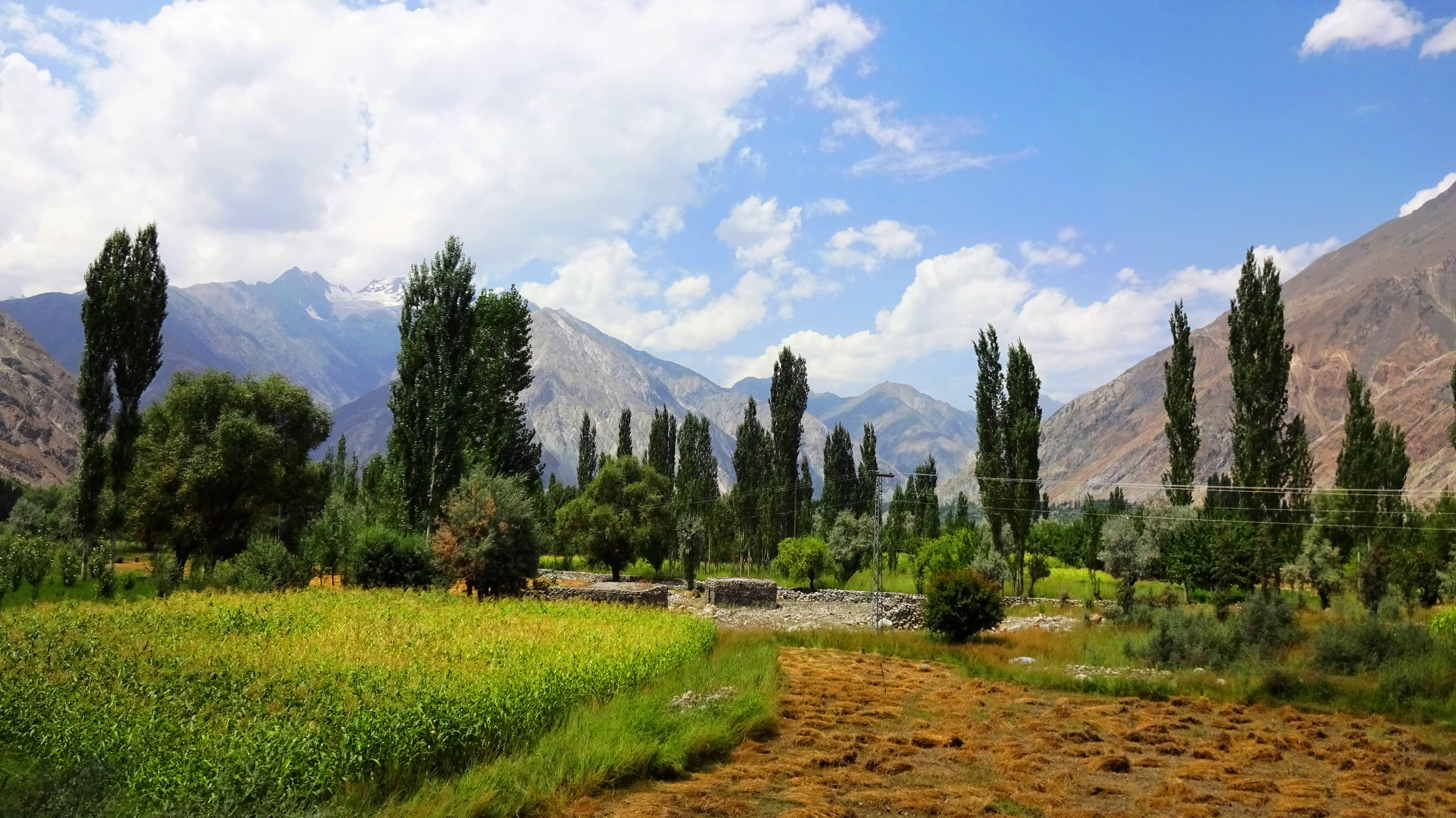
- Ishkoman Valley in summer

- Location within Gilgit Baltistan Location within Pakistan
- Coordinates: 36.5164°N 73.8502°E
- Country: Pakistan
- Region: Gilgit Baltistan
- District: Ghizer

The Ishkoman (Urdu: اشکومن) valley lies in the north of Ghizer District in Gilgit-Baltistan, Pakistan. It borders Afghanistan and the Pamir Wakhan Corridor. Its altitude ranges from 7,000 to 12,000 feet (2,100 to 3,700 m) above sea level. The languages spoken here include Shina, Khowar, Brushaski and Wakhi.

== See also ==
- Chatorkhand
- Pakkora
- Shahchoi Pass
- Khora Bhurt Pass
