= Ghizer District (1974–2019) =

Former district of Pakistan (1974–2019)

Coordinates: 36.1667°N 73.7500°E

- Former subdivision of Pakistan
- 1974–2019
- Location in Gilgit-Baltistan
- Capital: Gahkuch
  - Type: District
- History
  - Formation: 1974
  - Split: 2019

The Ghizer District (Urdu: ضلع غذر), was a district in the westernmost part of the Gilgit-Baltistan autonomous region in Pakistan, before splitting into the current Ghizer and Gupis-Yasin districts in 2019. The capital of the district was Gahkuch.

== Geography ==
Ghizer district was the northernmost part of Gilgit-Baltistan and hence the extreme north of the country. It bordered the Wakhan strip of Afghanistan on its north-west, and China on its northern borders. On its west was the Chitral District of Khyber Pakhtunkhwa; and on its east the Gilgit District. Diamer District was on its south, which is again a part of the northern areas. Gakuch was the capital of Ghizer District.

Gupis has been serving as a junction between Yasin and Phander valley. It is the central place from all valleys like Phandar, Yasin, Poniyal, etc. The valley is located between the world's greatest mountain ranges, namely the Hindu Kush and Karakarum.

The highest peak Ghizer District is Koyo Zom (6,871 m) (Hindu Kush Range), which lies on the boundary between Ghizer District and Chitral.

Some of the main places in the district are Koh-i-Ghizer, Golaghmuli Valley, Ishkoman and Yasin valleys. Other places include Gupis, Chatorkhand, Imit, Pingal, Shahmaran and Utz.

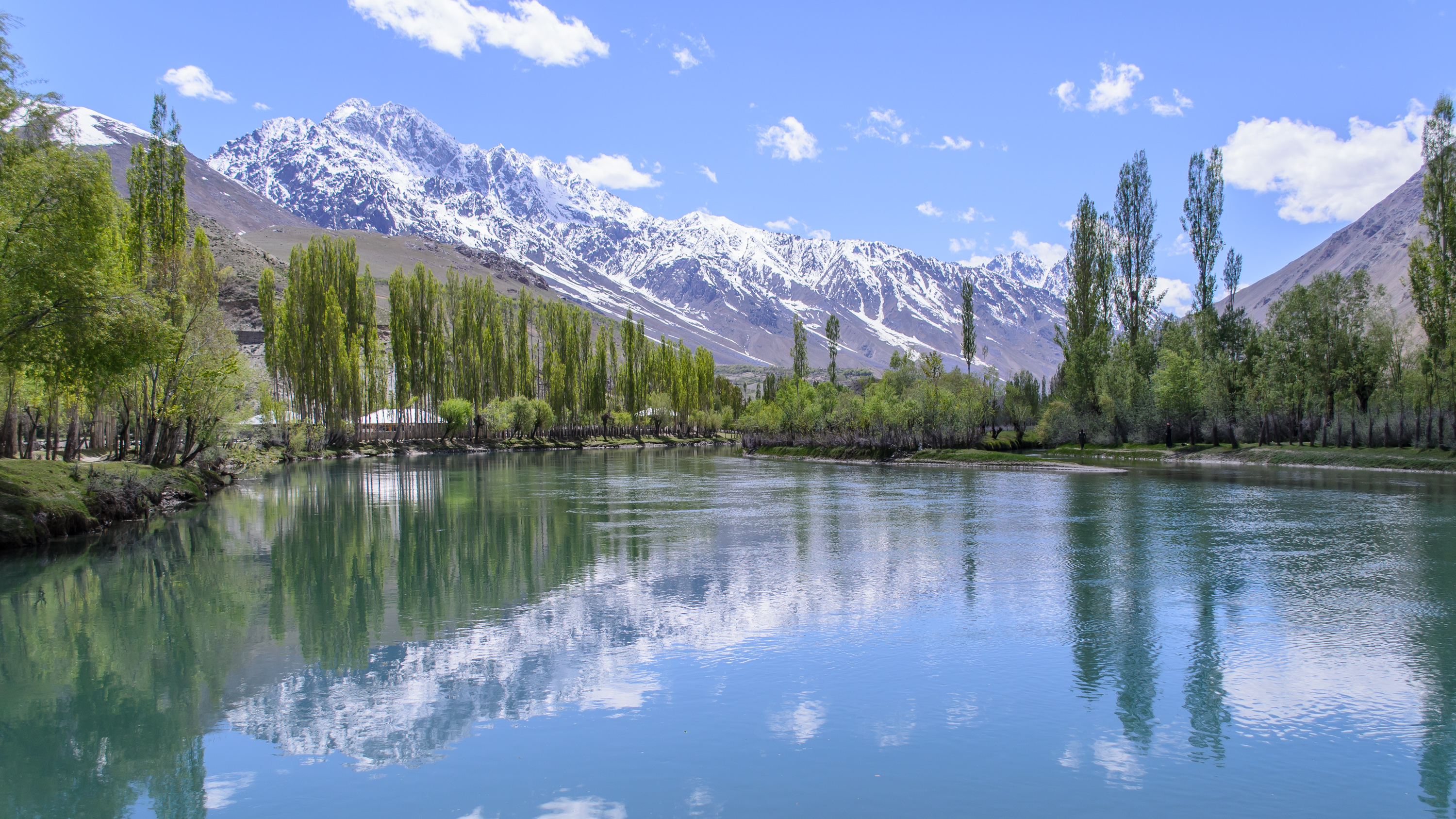
Phander Lake

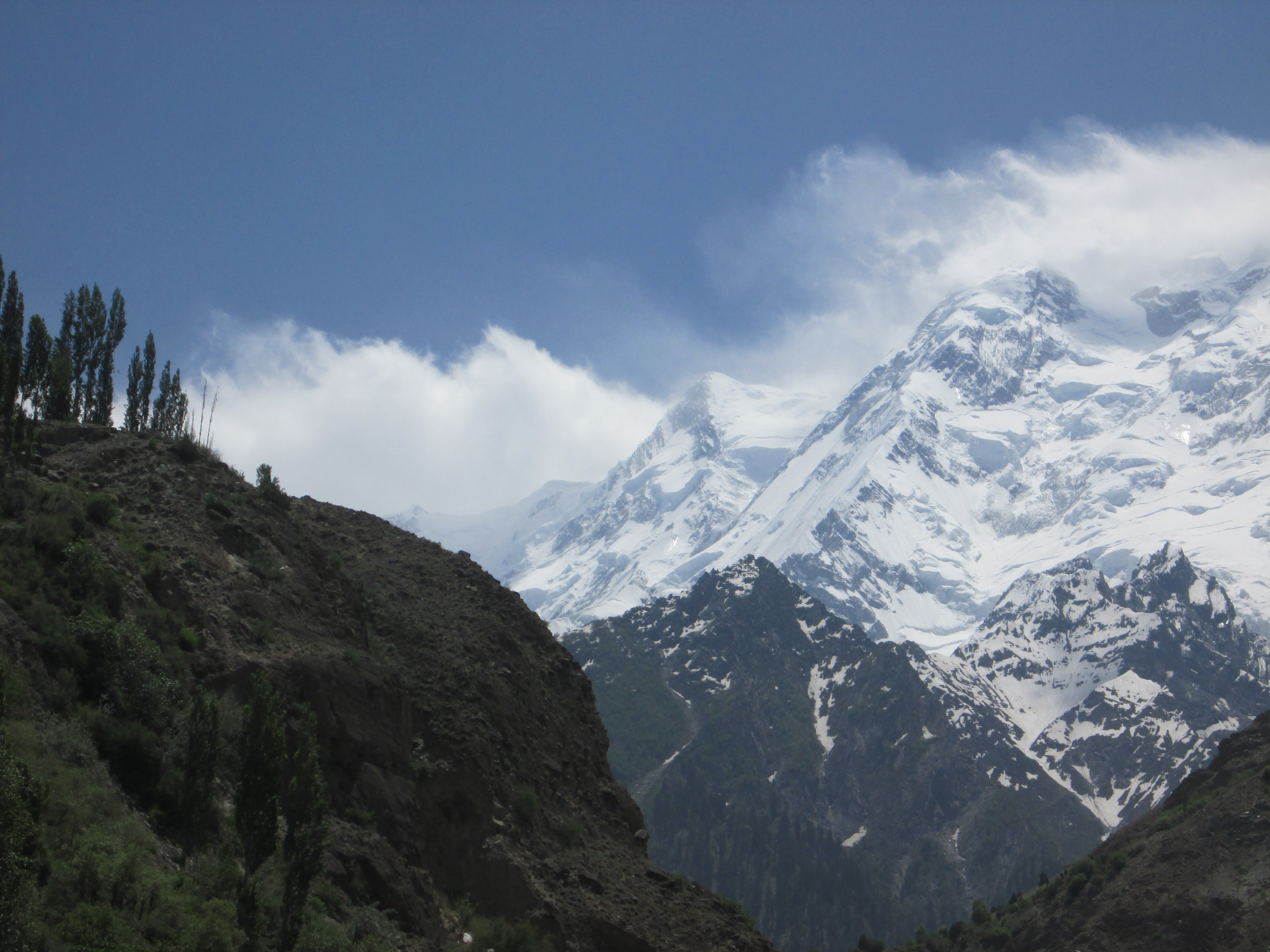
Gahkuch near Khalti Lake

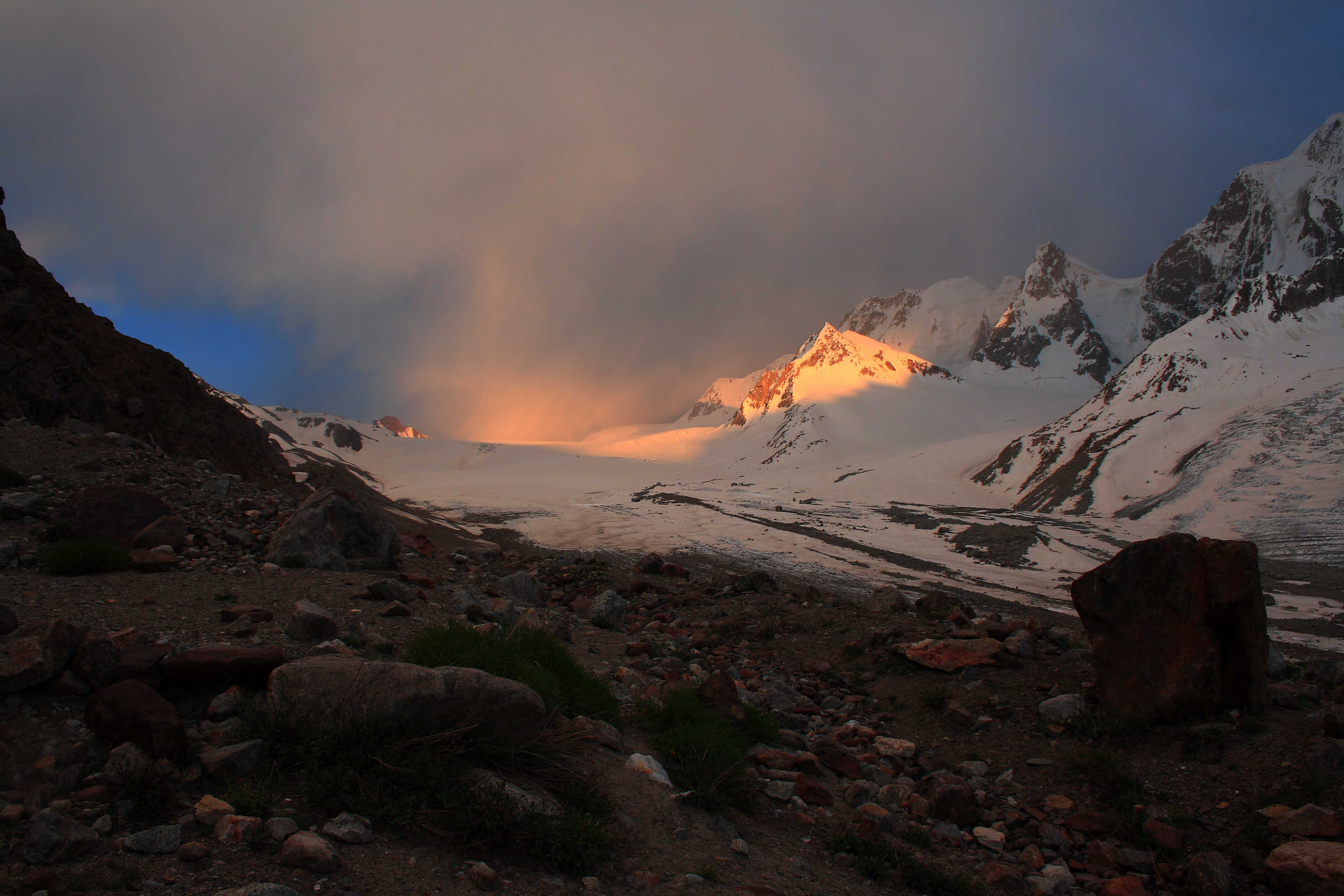
Darkot Pass

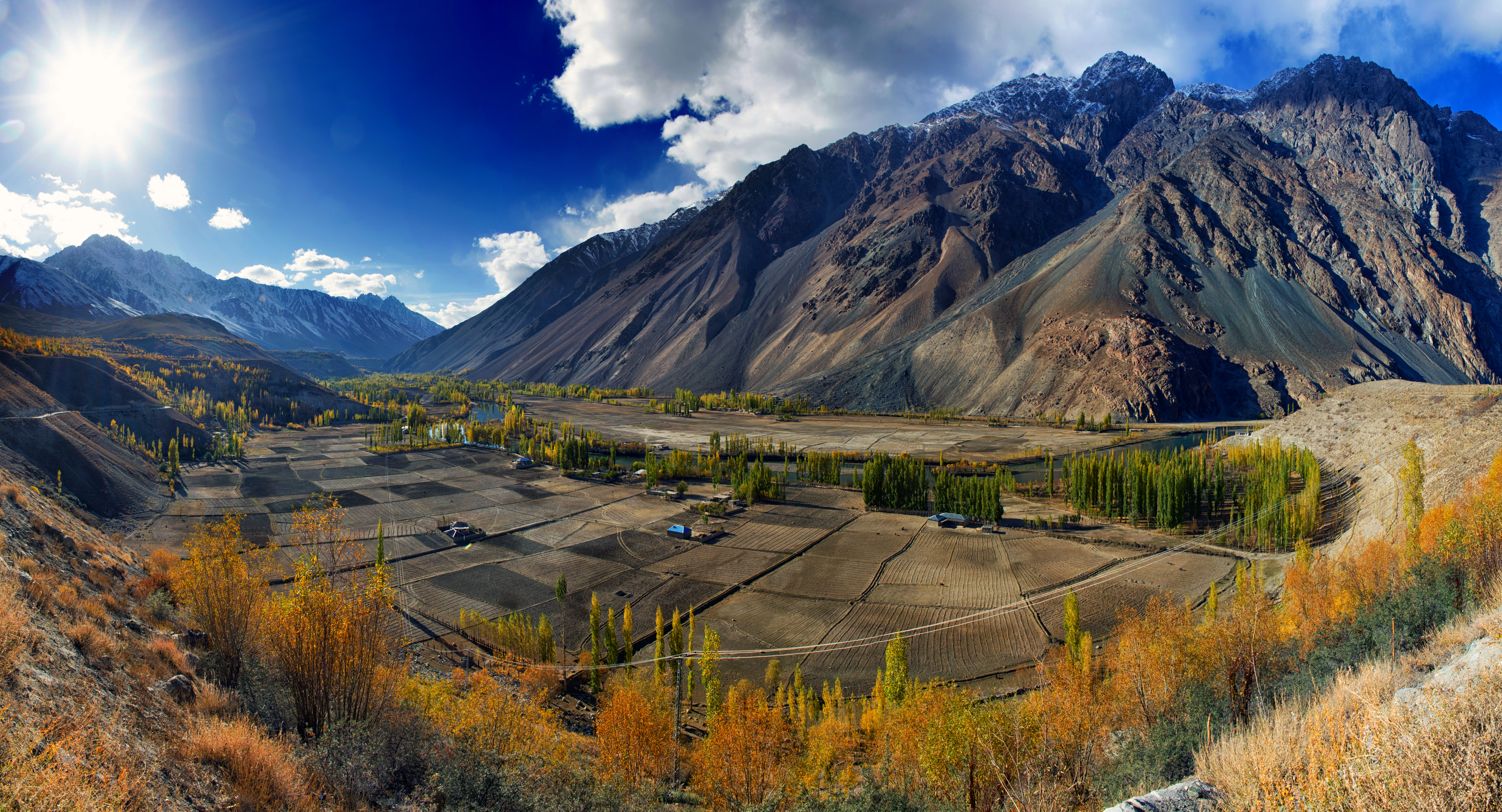
Phandar Valley

=== Passes ===
Some of the passes in the district were:

- Shandur Pass (Punji-Lusht Plain between the boundary of Ghizer and Chitral District)
- Qurumbar Pass, Chillingi Pass
- Chumarkhan Pass (Barsat in Ghizer to Chapali village in Chitral)
- Hayal Pass and Naltar Pass (on the boundary of Ghizer and Gilgit Districts)
- Bichhar Pass (on the boundary of Ghizer and Gilgit Districts)
- Thoi Pass (on the boundary of Ghizer and Chitral Yarkhon)
- Darkot Pass (on the boundary of Ghizer and Chitral).

=== Rivers ===
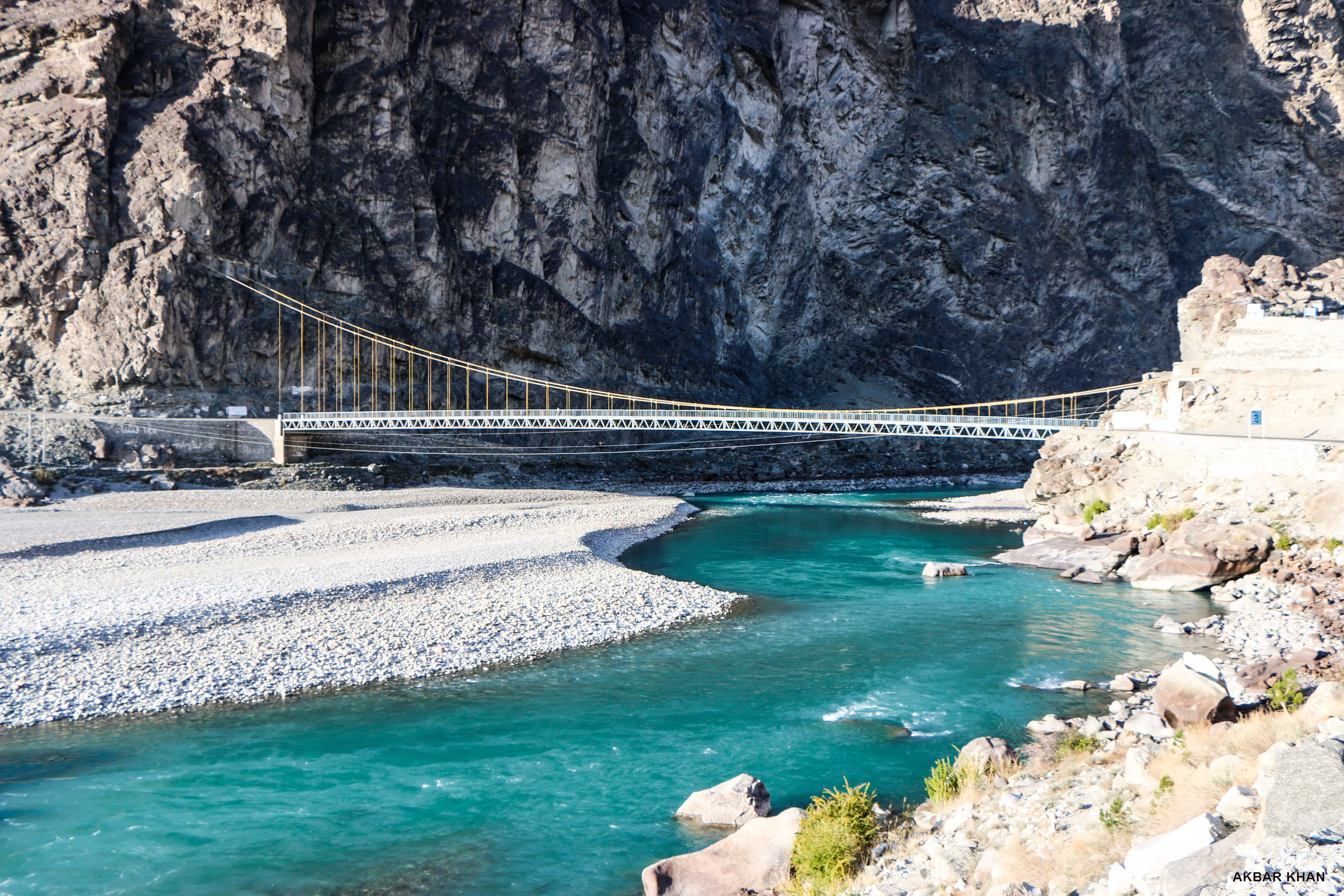
Bridge over the Ghizer River

The main river in the district is the Ghizer River, which is formed from the Gupis and Ishkoman Rivers; both meet at Hatoon valley with Hayim as the point of confluence. The other tributaries include the Qurumbar River, Phakora River, Hayal River, Singul River and Yasin River, Phander river tributary which also joins the mainstream at different points. The biggest nala in the region is singal nala in terms of area, which connects the Punial valley to the Diamer district.

=== Lakes ===
- Handarap Lake
- Phander Lake
- Khalti Lake
- Karambar Lake
- Baha Lake (Langar Khukush)
- Shandur Lake
- Attar Lake
- Mathantar Lake
- Utter lake / @Attar lake

== Education ==
According to the Alif Ailaan Pakistan District Education Rankings 2015, Ghizer was ranked 10 out of 148 districts in terms of education. For facilities and infrastructure, the district was ranked 17 out of 148.The biggest contribution in the region in education is "Aga Khan Education Service Pakistan"(AKESP).

== See also ==
- Districts of Gilgit-Baltistan
- Shandur Polo Festival
- Langer
- Gupis
