= Niat Qabool Hayat Kakakhel =

Niat Qabool Hayat
- Title: Numberdar-e-Aala

Personal life
- Born: September 5, 1905
- Died: October 18, 1986 (aged 81)
- Main interest(s): Islamic theology, Islamic jurisprudence, Islamic law

Religious life
- Religion: Islam
- Jurisprudence: Ismailism

Muslim leader
- Influenced: Rashid-al-Din Hamadani, Kia Bozorg Omid

Niat Qabool Hayat Kakakhel (also Kakakhail; September 5, 1905 – October 18, 1986) was a politician from Gilgit-Baltistan in Pakistan who was, after 1973, assistant to the Governor of Gupis. Kakakhel was a member of the Central Asia Supreme Council and a senior member of the Aga Khan Council. He was a ruling official during the Frontier Crimes Regulations (FCR) period in the early 1970s.

== Early life ==
Hayat Kakakhel was born on 5 September 1905 in the Ghizer Valley, located in present-day Gupis-Yasin District of the former Gilgit Agency. He belonged to a prominent Syed family that held local authority in the region. At the age of 21, he was appointed Numberdar of Ghizer. In subsequent years, he succeeded his uncle, Zumbool Hayat, further consolidating his position. Serving under the governorship of Raja Gupis, Maqpoon Hussain Ali Khan, Kakakhel was regarded as an able and influential local administrator and was conferred the title of “Aala Numberdar.”

== Shandur polo ground ==
In 1935, Evelyn Hey Cobb, the British administrator of Gilgit Agency, asked Niat Qabool Hayat Kakakhel to build a well-constructed polo ground in Shandur Top, a project that was completed with the dedicated assistance of local villagers. The resulting polo ground, named Mas Junali, measured 56 by 200 meters, slightly smaller than a standard polo field, which typically measures 150 by 270 meters. The name “Mas Junali” originates from the Khowar language, meaning “moon” and “polo ground,” reflecting Cobb’s fondness for moonlit polo matches, which added a touch of magic to the game.

Impressed by Kakakhel’s efficient construction, Cobb offered a reward, which was declined in favor of a request to stock the local waterways with Trout fish. This selfless gesture demonstrated Kakakhel’s commitment to the community’s well-being. Consequently, Cobb introduced trout from England to the Ghizer River, leading to the establishment of the Directorate of Fisheries and creating hundreds of jobs for the local population. The trout population has since thrived, with notable sizes recorded in Hundrap Lake and Baha Khukush Lake, reaching up to 24 kilograms (53 lb) and 45 kilograms (99 lb), respectively.

== Literary elevation in Gilgit-Baltistan ==
In 1940, Niat Qabool Hayat Kakakhail founded a private primary schools in Koh-i-Ghizer. Initially, students from this school would go on to attend schools in farthest cities for further education, but soon, the administrators of Aga Khan Education Services recognized the school’s potential and affiliated it with their organization. This partnership proved to be a game-changer, as the school’s commitment to education led to a significant increase in the literacy rate in the area, surpassing an impressive 85%.
