= Tourism in Gilgit-Baltistan =

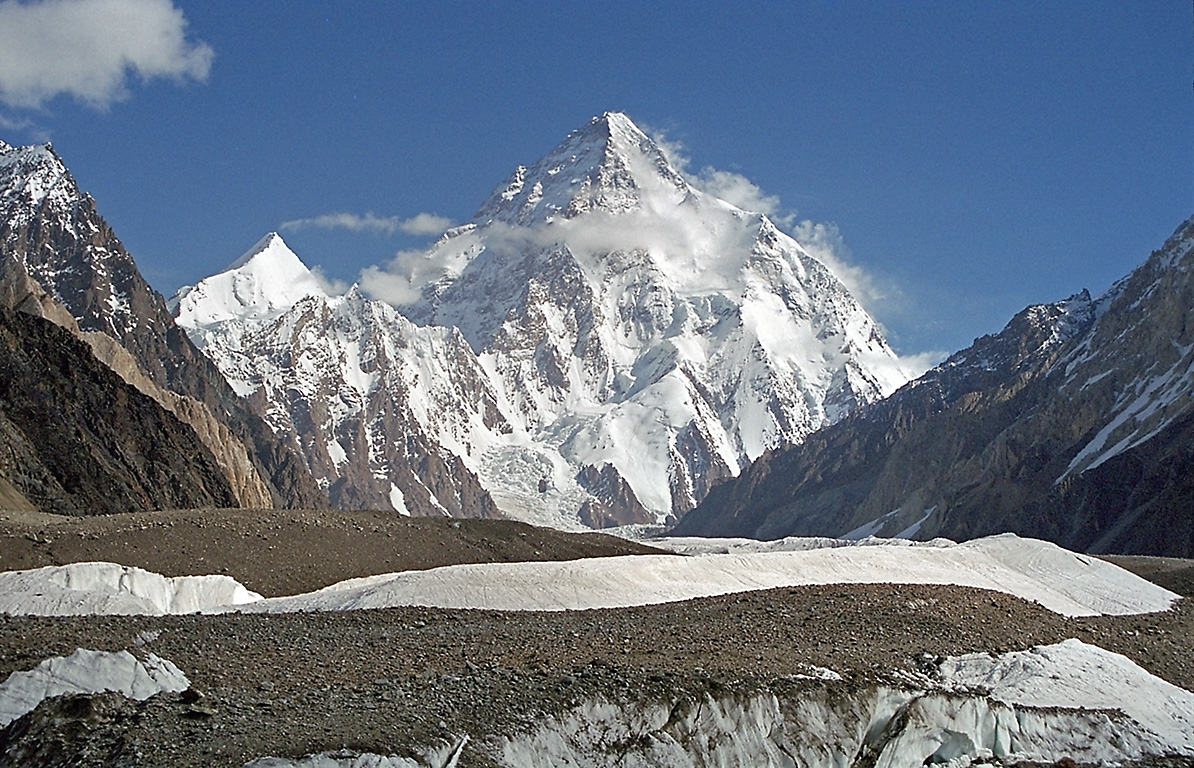
K2 as seen from Concordia

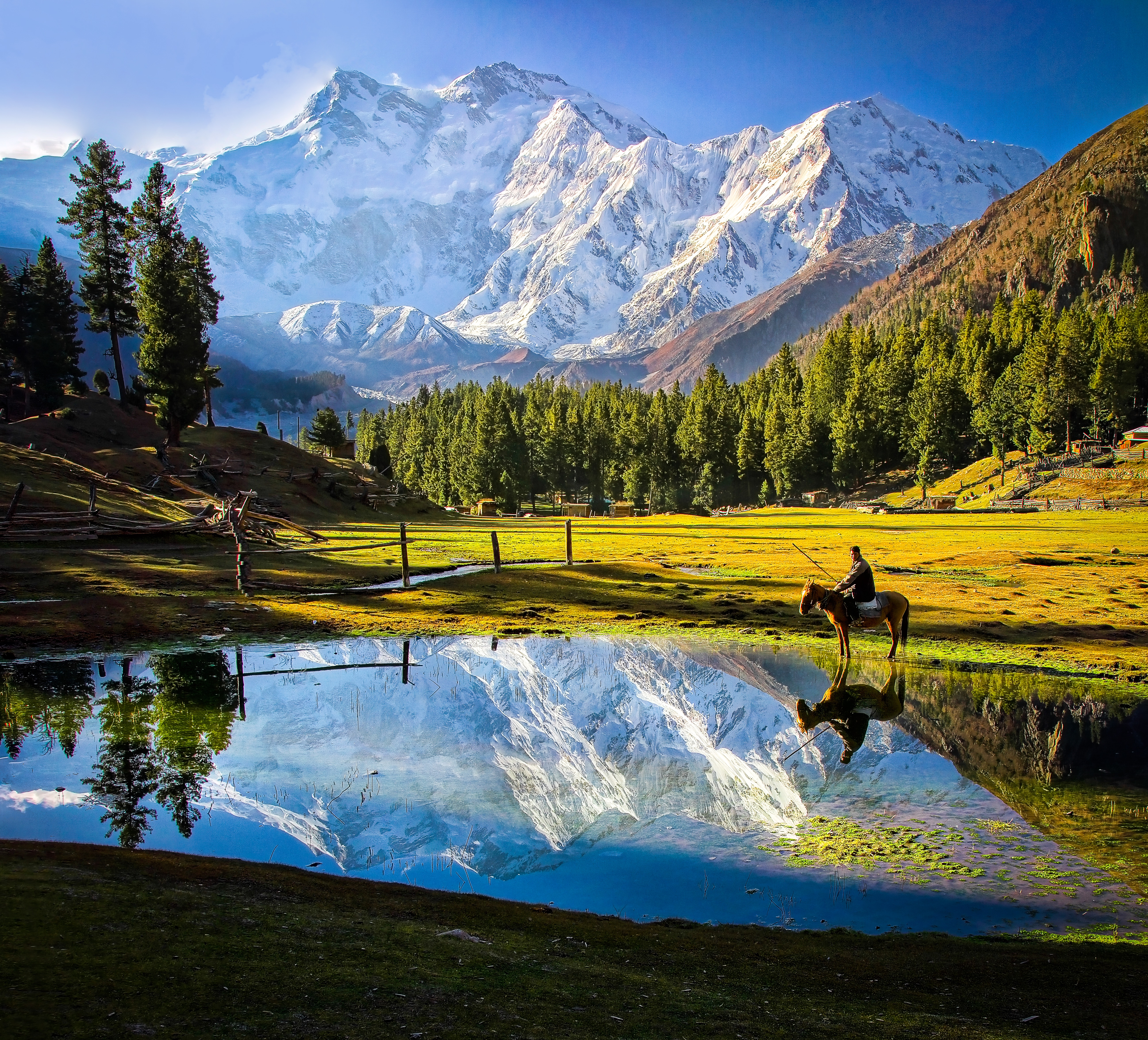
Nanga Parbat from Fairy Meadows

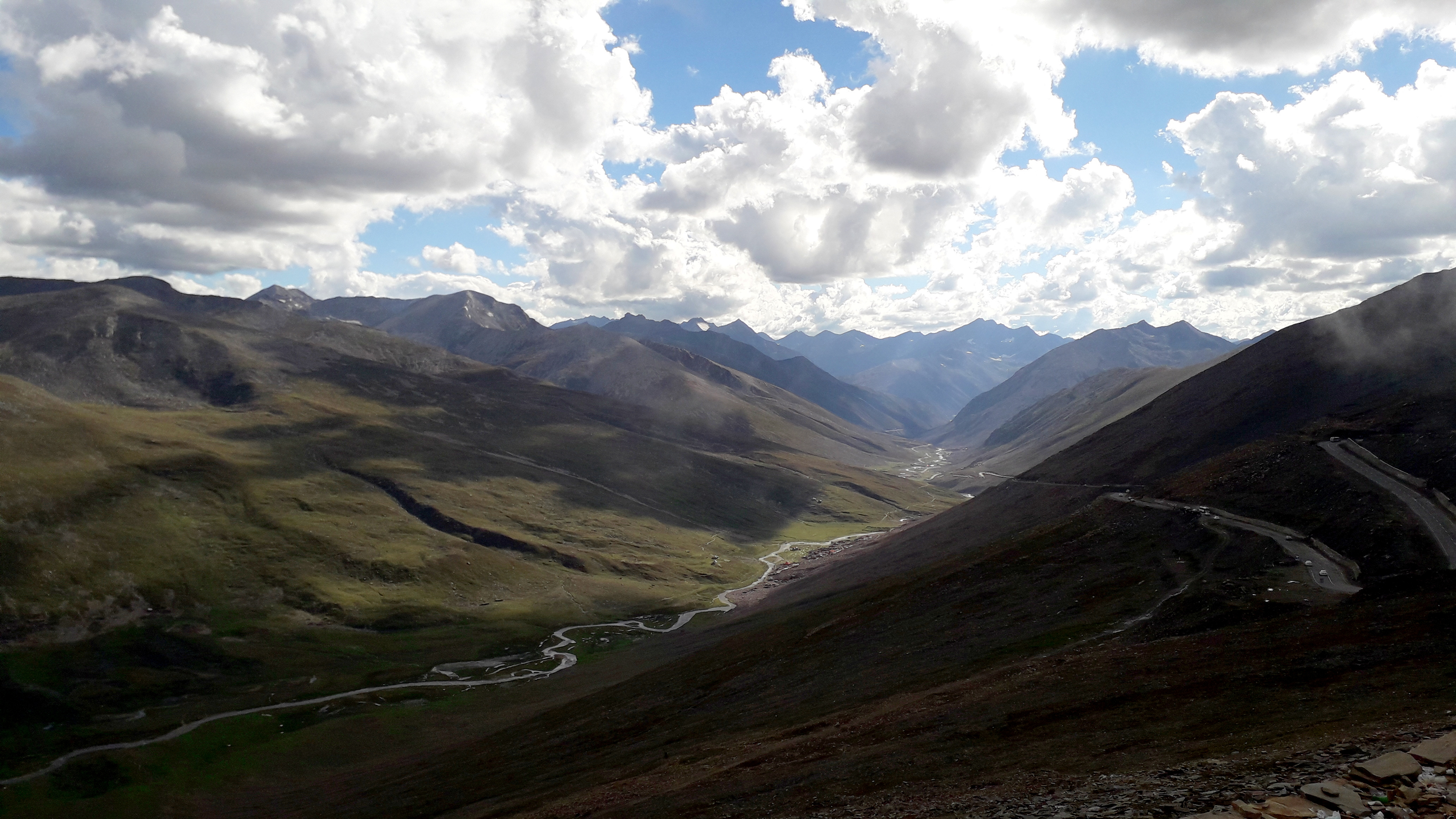
Route to Chilas at the end of Kaghan Valley in Khyber Pakhtunkhwa territory via Babusar Top within Lulusar-Dudipatsar National Park.

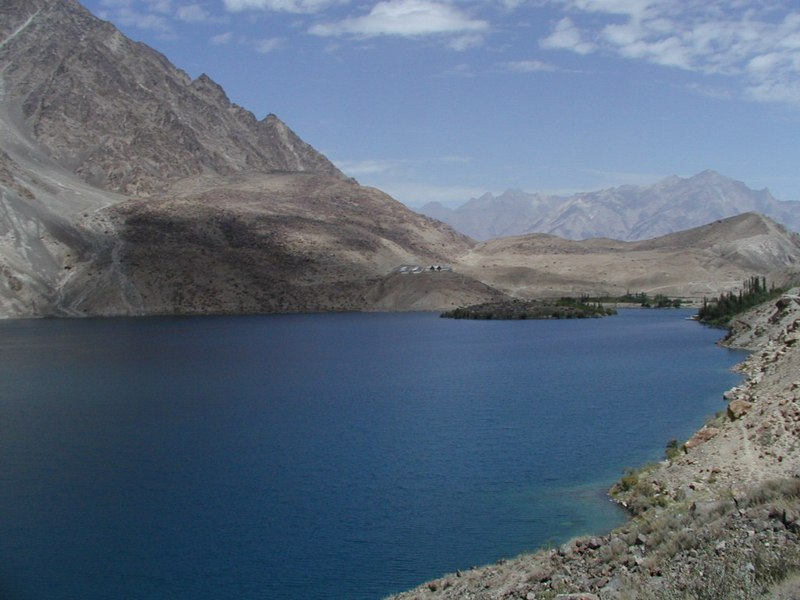
Satpara Lake, Skardu, in 2002

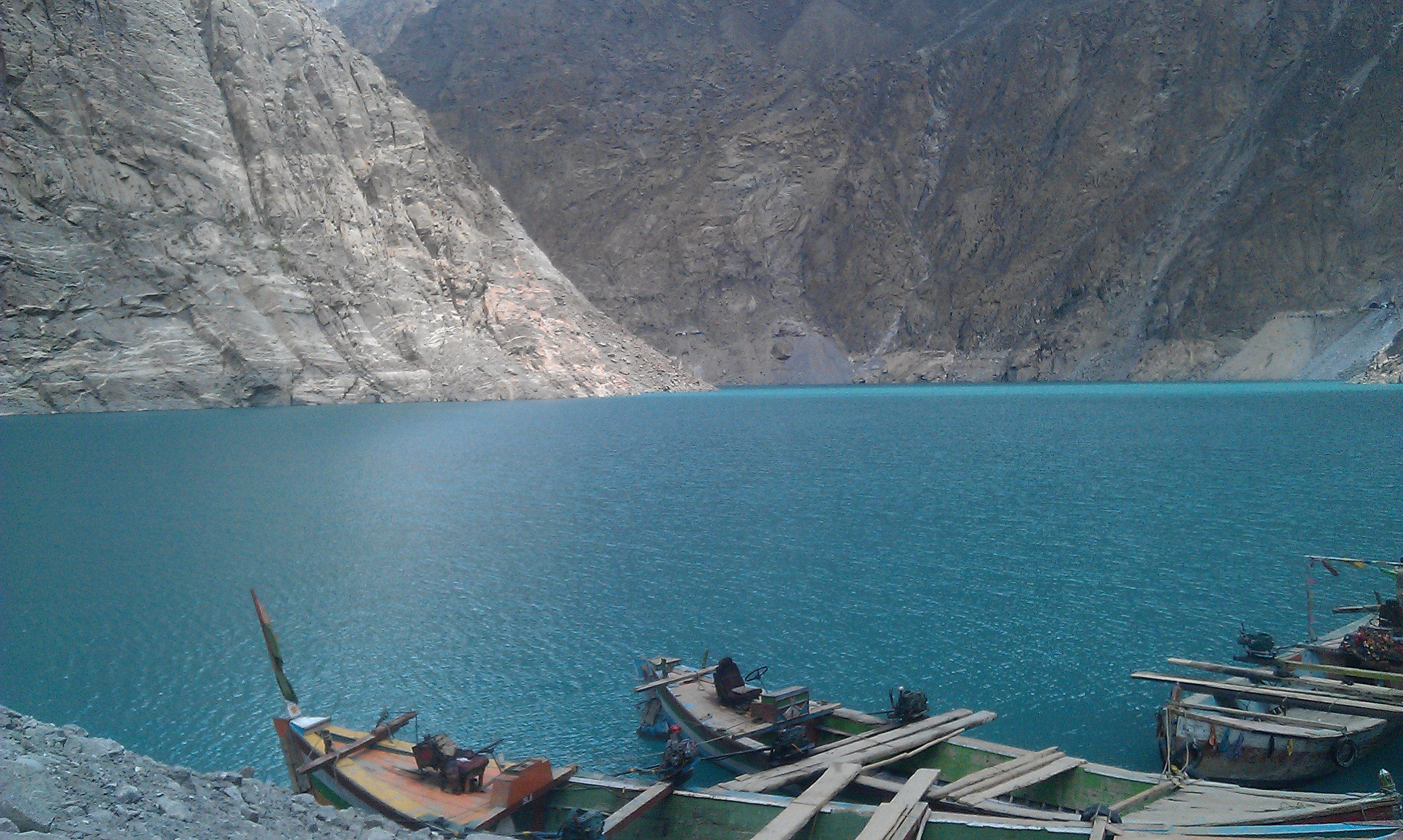
Attabad Lake, Hunza

Tourism in Gilgit-Baltistan, an administered territory of Pakistan, focuses on its access to various mountain ranges and alpine terrain. Various tourist destinations attract millions of travelers from within Pakistan. On the other hand, tourists from other countries also routinely visit GB. An estimated 1.72 million tourists visited the region in 2017 according to the Pakistan Tourism Development Corporation (PTDC). Travelers had contributed Rs.300 million to the local economy in 2017. The authorities were expecting 2.5 million tourists in 2018 which would have meant an additional Rs.450 million to the economy.

== Geography ==
Gilgit-Baltistan borders Pakistan's Khyber Pakhtunkhwa Province to the west, a small portion of the Wakhan Corridor of Afghanistan to the north, Xinjiang, China to the northeast, the Indian territory Jammu and Kashmir and Ladakh to the southeast, and the Pakistani-administered state of Azad Kashmir to the south.

Gilgit-Baltistan is home to five of the "eight-thousanders" and to more than fifty peaks above 7,000 metres (23,000 ft). Gilgit, Astore and Skardu are the three main hubs for expeditions to those mountains. The region is home to some of the world's highest mountain ranges. The main ranges are the Karakoram and the western Himalayas. The Pamir Mountains are to the north, and the Hindu Kush lies to the west. Amongst the highest mountains are K2 (Mount Godwin-Austen) and Nanga Parbat, the latter being one of the most feared mountains in the world. Known as the “Killer Mountain,” Nanga Parbat’s fatality rate is approximately 21 deaths per 100 successful summits.

Three of the world's longest glaciers outside the polar regions are found in Gilgit-Baltistan: the Biafo Glacier, the Baltoro Glacier, and the Batura Glacier. There are, in addition, several high-altitude lakes in Gilgit-Baltistan.

== Karakoram Highway ==
The Karakoram Highway is the major highway of Gilgit-Baltistan, which connects the region with the rest of Pakistan to the south and with China at its north end. It is the highest paved road in the world and is sometimes termed as the "8th Wonder of World."

== Major valleys ==
Gilgit Baltistan is home to some of the world highest valleys. These include Ghanche, Shiger, Astore Valley, Gilgit, Ghizer Valley, Hunza Valley, Skardu and Nagar Valley.

=== Hunza Valley ===
Hunza Valley is considered one of the most beautiful valleys of Gilgit-Baltistan. It consists of Upper Hunza, Central Hunza, and Lower Hunza. Karimabad is the major city of the valley and has all facilities for mountaineers and tourists. The popularity of the Hunza Valley and the amount of tourism there is due in part to its relative accessibility and proximity to the Karakoram Highway.

Major tourist attractions in Hunza are:

- Attabad Lake - A major lake of Hunza Valley. It was created following a landslide at Hunza River near Attabad village on 4 January 2010. The resulting damming of the river caused the lake to slowly form, submerging several villages and displacing up to 6,000 people.
- Altit Fort - a medieval period fort in the valley
- Baltit Fort - An old medieval fort located in Karimabad. It is in the tentative list of the UNESCO World Heritage Sites.
- Hussaini Suspension Bridge - A long wooden suspension bridge over Hunza River near Husaaini village in Gojal. It is termed as one of the most dangerous bridges in the world.
- Khunjerab Pass - At 4,693 meters, this is the highest border crossing in the world. It is also the only modern crossing on the China-Pakistan border. Most tourists visit on a daytrip from Hunza to see the border and then leave. The surrounding area is also a part of the Khunjerab National Park, which was set up to protect local, endangered wildlife, specifically the Marco Polo sheep.

=== Skardu Valley ===
Skardu Valley is located at confluence of Indus and Shiger rivers surrounded by the peaks of Karakoram.

== Lakes ==
- Attabad Lake, Hunza
- Barodaroksh Lake in Bar Valley, Nagar
- Borith Lake in Gojal, upper Hunza, Gilgit
- Byarsa Tso Lake in Gultari, Baltistan
- Ghorashi Lake in Ghandus Valley, Kharmang
- Kachura Lake
  - Lower Kachura Lake in Skardu, Baltistan
  - Upper Kachura Lake (Foroq Tso)
  - Zambakha Tso (lake)
- Katpana tso Lake in Skardu, Baltistan
- Khalti Lake, Gupis-Yasin District
- Lake Kharfak tso in Gangche, Baltistan
- Phoroq Tso Lake in Skardu, Baltistan
- Rama sar Lake near Astore
- Rush sar Lake near Nagar, Gilgit
- Karambar Lake at Kromber Pass Ishkoman Valley, Ghizer
- Satpara tso Lake in Skardu, Baltistan
- Sheosar tso Lake in Deosai National Park, Skardu
- Sozgung tso Lake in Thalay Valley, Baltistan
- Zharba Tso Lake in Shigar, Baltistan

== Mountains ==
=== Eight-thousanders ===
K2 (Mount Godwin Austin/Chogori)
Nanga Parbat
Gasherbrum l
Broad Peak
Gasherbrum ll

=== Seven-thousanders ===
Gasherbrum lll
Gasherbrum lV
Masherbrum (K1)
Rakaposhi
Saltoro Kangri (K10)

== See also ==
- Tourism in Pakistan
