= Shandur =

Shandur or Shandoor may refer to

- Shandur Pass, mountain pass in Chitral
- Shandur Polo Ground, polo ground in Gilgit Baltistan
- Shandur National Park, national park in Gilgit Baltistan
- Shandur Lake, lake in Gilgit Baltistan
- Shandur Polo Festival, annual polo festival held at Shandur
- RAF Shandur, a WW2 RAF base in Egypt
