= Ghizer, Gilgit-Baltistan =

Valley in Gilgit-Baltistan

Ghizer Valley وادئ غذر
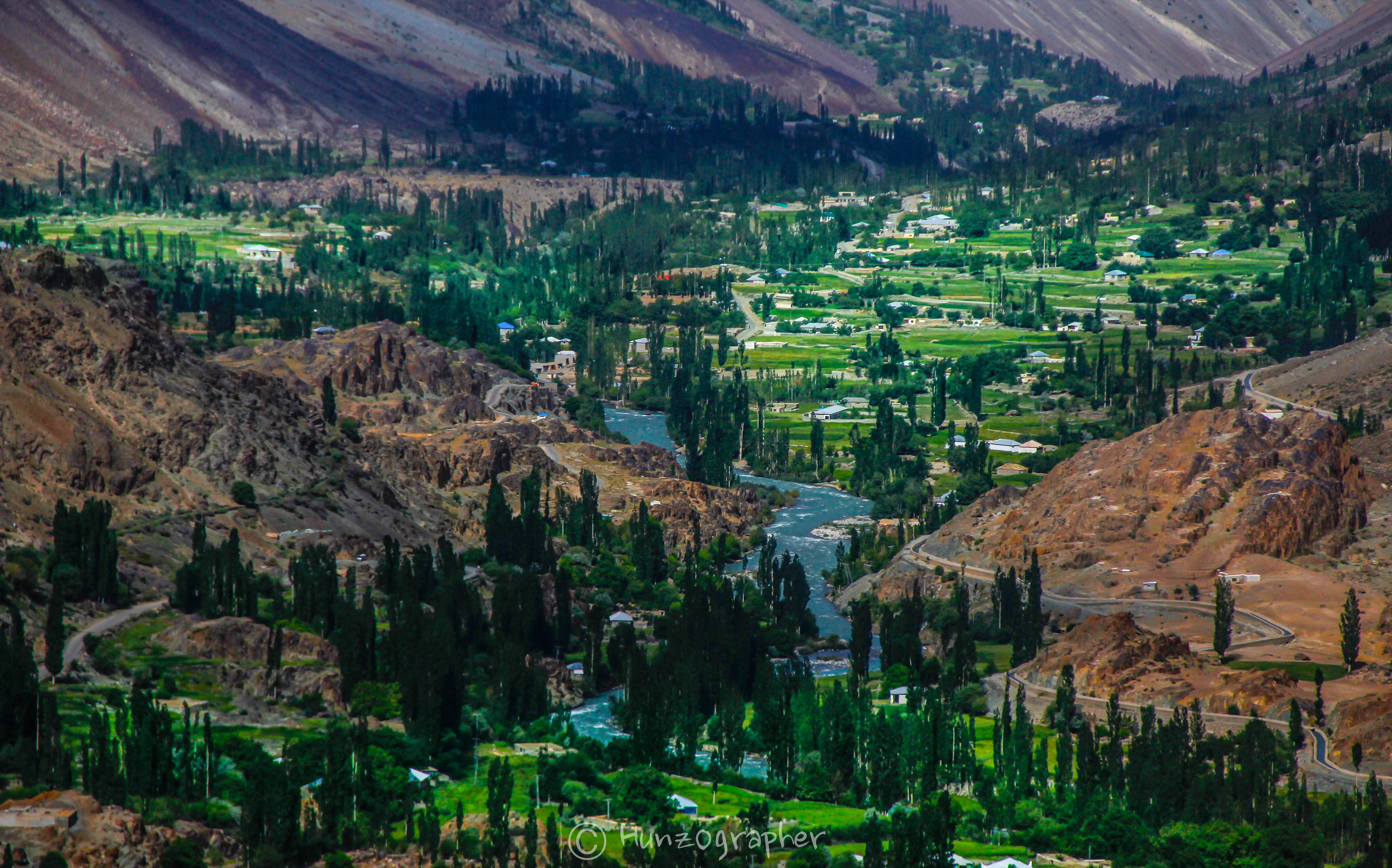

- Location in Gilgit-Baltistan
- Coordinates: 36°09′26″N 72°44′17″E
- Country: Pakistan
- State: Gilgit-Baltistan
- District: Gupis–Yasin District
- Elevation: 3,030 m (9,940 ft)
- Postal code: 15300
- Rivers: Ghizer River (Gilgit River)

Ghizer Valley (Urdu: وادی غزر), also known as Koh-i-Ghizer (Urdu: کوہ غذر), is a mountainous valley located in the Gupis–Yasin District of Gilgit-Baltistan, Pakistan.

Ghizer Valley and Phander Valley are located in the west of District Gupis–Yasin. It includes the villages of Rawat, Shamaran, Chashi, Phander, Ghizer, Gulaghmuli, Golaghtori, Terich, Handarap, Handarap Nallah including Lake, Herkush, Teru, Karim Abad, Hilthi, Barset and a wide area of Khukush Nallah, Shandur.

Administratively, Tehsil Phander is a new tehsil and is under the jurisdiction of GB-LA 30. The Phander Village is the headquarter of the Tehsil Phander. However, Ghizer (originally called Gherz) is also a populated village within this tehsil.

== Lakes ==
Ghizer Valley has a number of lakes including;

- Khukush Lake
- Shandur Lake
- Handarap Lake
- Phander Lake
- Golaghtori Lake 1
- Golaghtori Lake 2
- Shahi Mall Lake
- Barich Lake
