= Gilgit (disambiguation) =

Gilgit is a city in northern Pakistan

Gilgit may refer to other terms related with the area of the city:

- Gilgit River
- Gilgit Valley
- Gilgit District
- Gilgit Division
- Gilgit Agency (former administrative region of British India and of Pakistan)
- Gilgit Airport

== See also ==
- Gilgit-Baltistan, formerly known as the Northern Areas, is the northernmost administrative territory in Pakistan
