= Khalti Lake =

Reservoir in Gilgit-Baltistan, Pakistan

- خلتی جھیل (Urdu); خلتیو چھت (Khowar)
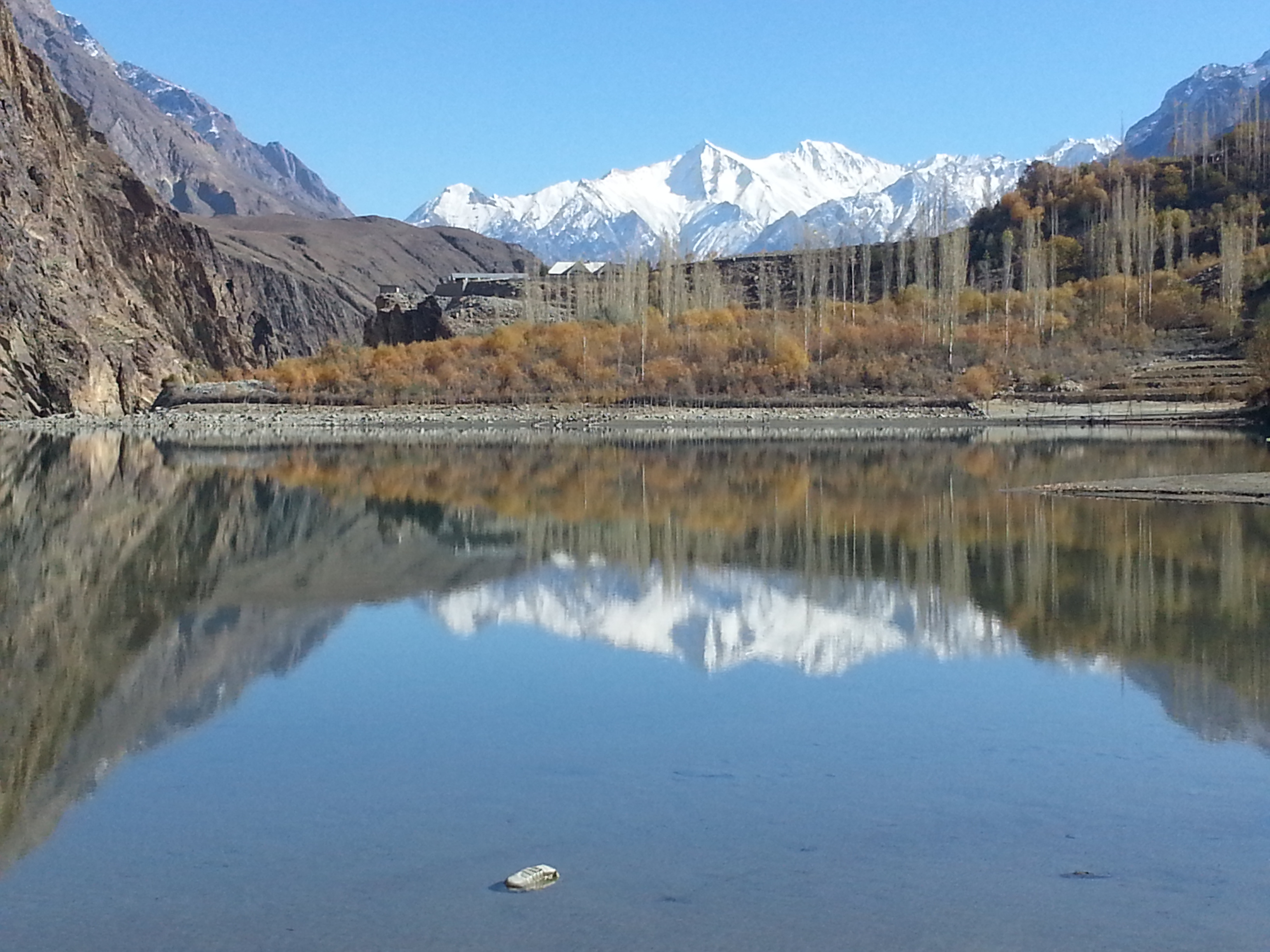
- Khalti Lake, Gupis-Yasin

- Location in Gilgit Baltistan Khalti Lake (Pakistan)
- Interactive map of Khalti Lake
- Location: Khalti, Gupis-Yasin District, Gilgit–Baltistan, Pakistan
- Coordinates: 36°14′53″N 73°21′48″E
- Type: Lake, Reservoir
- Primary inflows: Ghizer River
- Basin countries: Pakistan
- Max. length: 2,354 m (7,723 ft)
- Max. width: 460 m (1,510 ft)
- Surface area: 98 acres (40 ha)
- Max. depth: 80 ft (24 m)
- Surface elevation: 2,217 metres (7,274 ft)

Khalti Lake (Urdu: خلتی جھیل, Khowar: خلتیو چھت) is situated in Gupis-Yasin District, the westernmost part of the Gilgit–Baltistan region and northernmost territory of Pakistan. This lake is an important source of fresh water and has a stock of trout. A PTDC motel is situated nearby with a view of the lake. The water is extremely cold which flows directly from surrounding glaciers. The lake usually freezes during winter, allowing people to walk on and across it..

Khalti Lake is located in Khalti Village of Gupis-Yasin District (Gilgit-Baltistan), Pakistan at about 2,217 metres (7,274 ft) above sea level. The lake is in a bend of the Ghizer River near the village of Khalti. Khalti Lake is known for its stock of trout. Originally, the trout was put into the River Ghizer near Golaghmuli village. The fish multiplied and reached almost every part of Gupis Valley.

== See also ==
- Phander Lake
- Handarap Lake
