= Gilgit Valley =

Valley in Gilgit-Baltistan, northern Pakistan

- Location within Gilgit Baltistan
- Floor elevation: 2,000 m (6,600 ft)

Geography
- Location: Gilgit District, Gilgit Baltistan, Pakistan
- Population centers: Gilgit
- Coordinates: 36.233°N 73.585°E
- Rivers: Gilgit River
- Interactive map of Gilgit Valley

Gilgit Valley (Urdu: وادئ گلگت) is a river valley traversed by the Gilgit River in Gilgit-Baltistan, northern Pakistan. A section of upper portion is also known as Ghizer. Shandur Pass leads from Chitral into Gilgit Valley.

== Geography ==
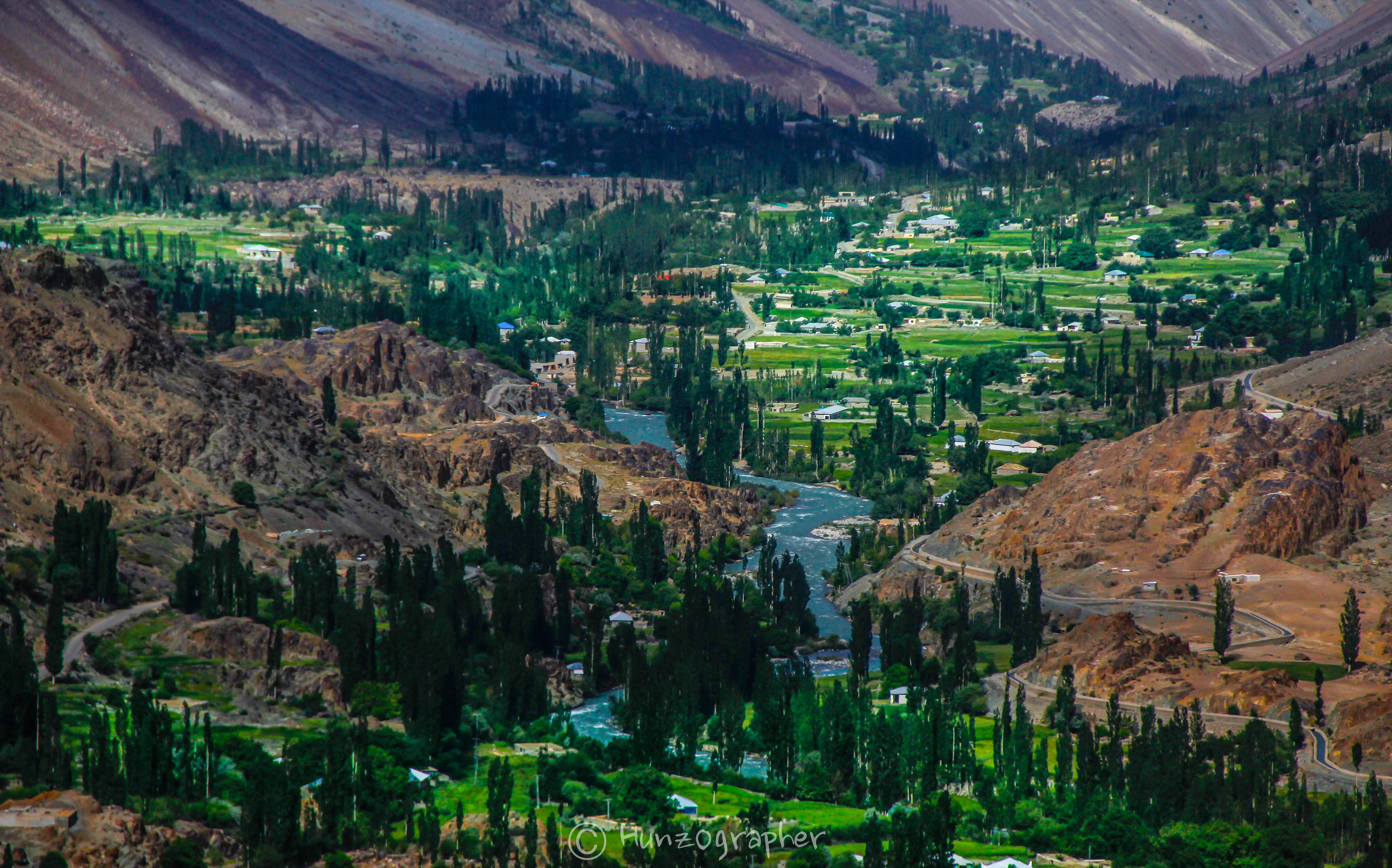
A view of Gilgit River flowing through Phander in the Gilgit Valley

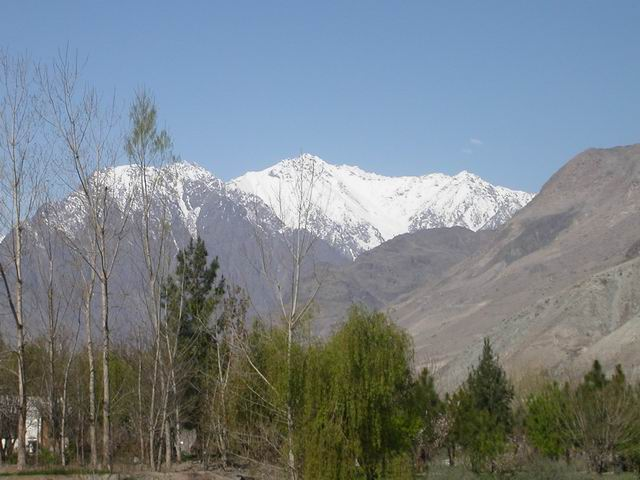
A view of Gilgit Valley near Sonikot, Gilgit

=== Lakes ===
Gilgit Valley has a number of lakes including;

- Khukush Lake
- Shandur Lake
- Handarap Lake
- Phander Lake

== Climate ==
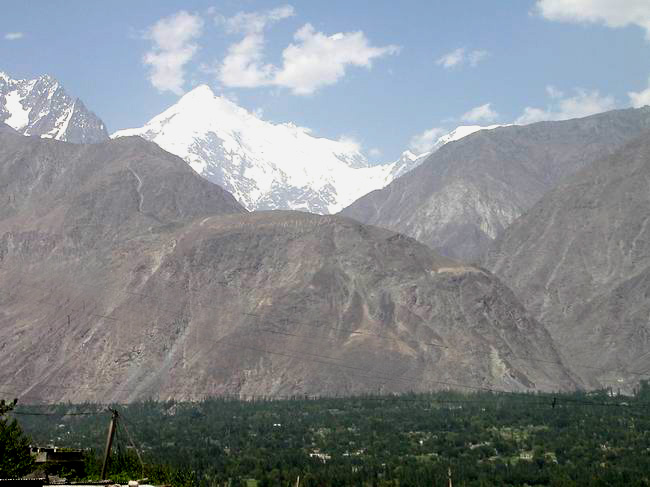
A view of Gilgit Valley near Gilgit

== Transport ==
375 km of road connects it to the town of Chitral via the Shandur Pass (3,800 m).

== Demographics ==
The town of Gilgit lies in the valley.
