= Ghizer District (disambiguation) =

Ghizer District may refer to:

- Ghizer District, district in Pakistan
- Ghizer District (1974–2019), former district
