= Phander Lake =

Lake in Gilgit-Baltistan, Pakistan

- Nango Chatt
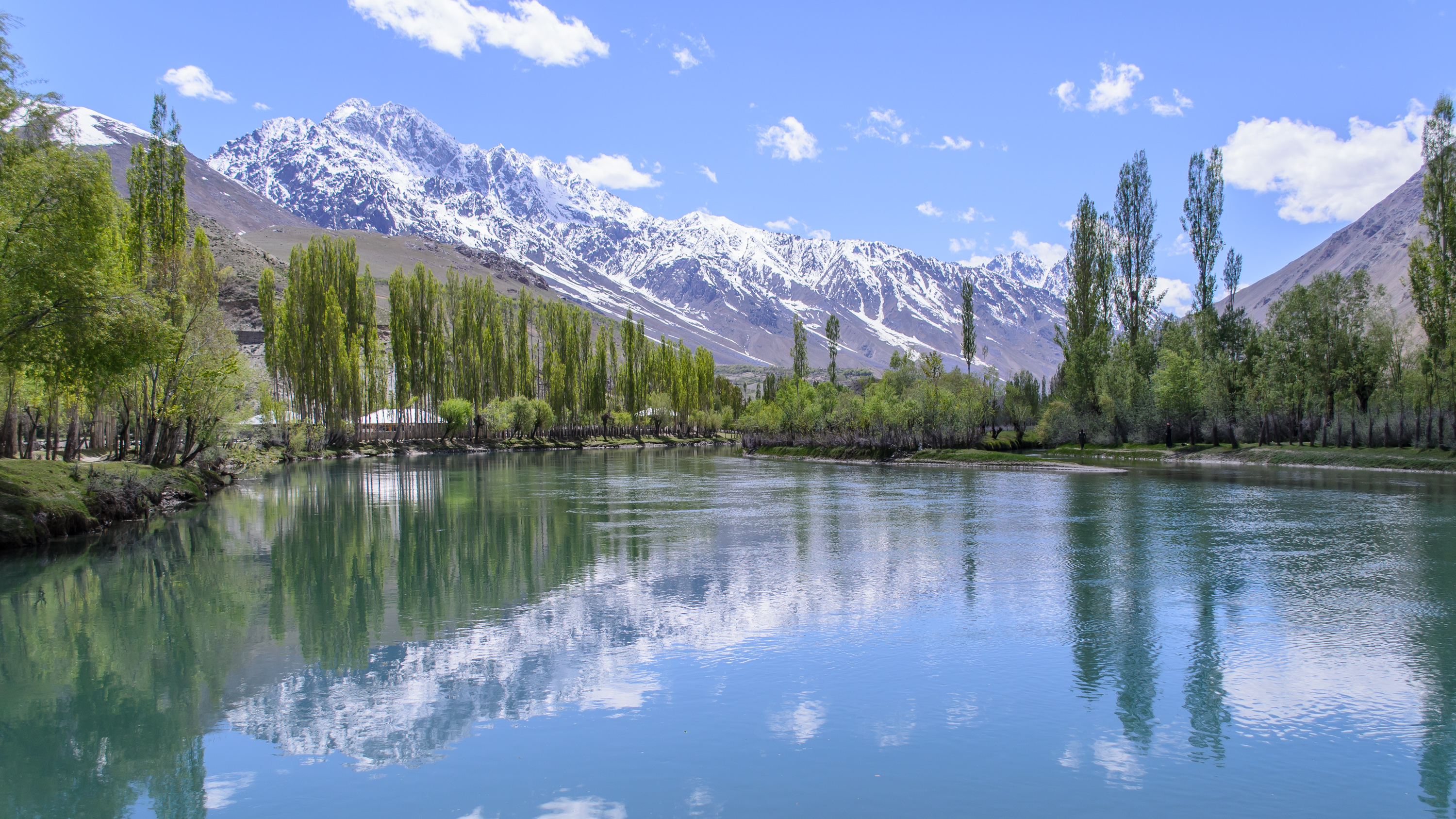

- Location in Gilgit Baltistan Phander Lake (Pakistan)
- Interactive map of Phander Lake
- Location: Phander, Gupis-Yasin District, Gilgit–Baltistan
- Coordinates: 36°10′23″N 72°56′48″E
- Type: lake, reservoir
- Primary inflows: Ghizer River
- Basin countries: Pakistan
- Max. length: 900 m (3,000 ft)
- Max. width: 460 m (1,510 ft)
- Surface area: 40 acres (16 ha)
- Max. depth: 44 m (144 ft)

Phander Lake is situated in the Phander Village, in Gupis-Yasin District, the westernmost part of the Gilgit–Baltistan region and northernmost territory of Pakistan. This lake is an important source of fresh water.

== Location ==
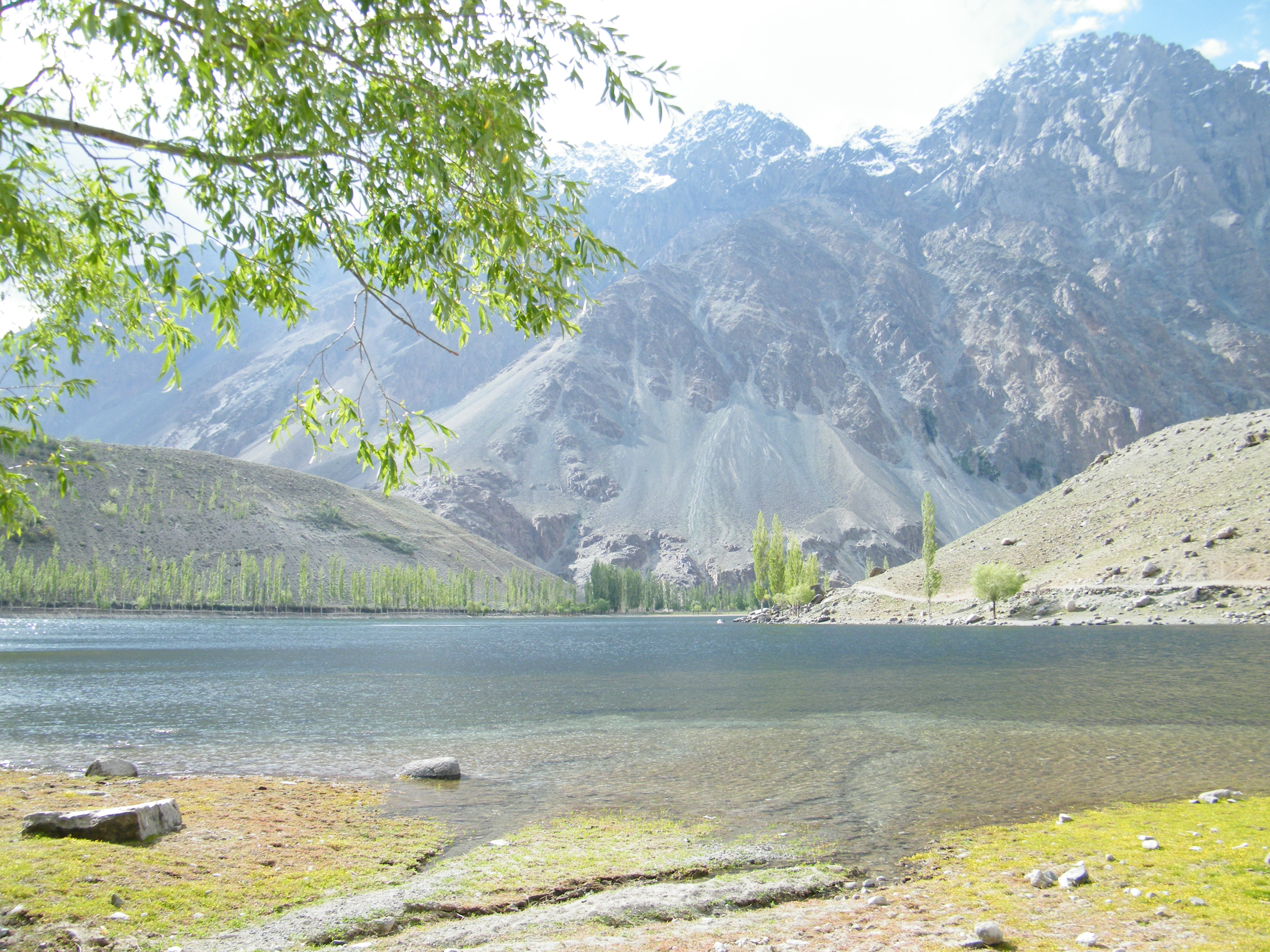
Phunder Lake in Gupis-Yasin

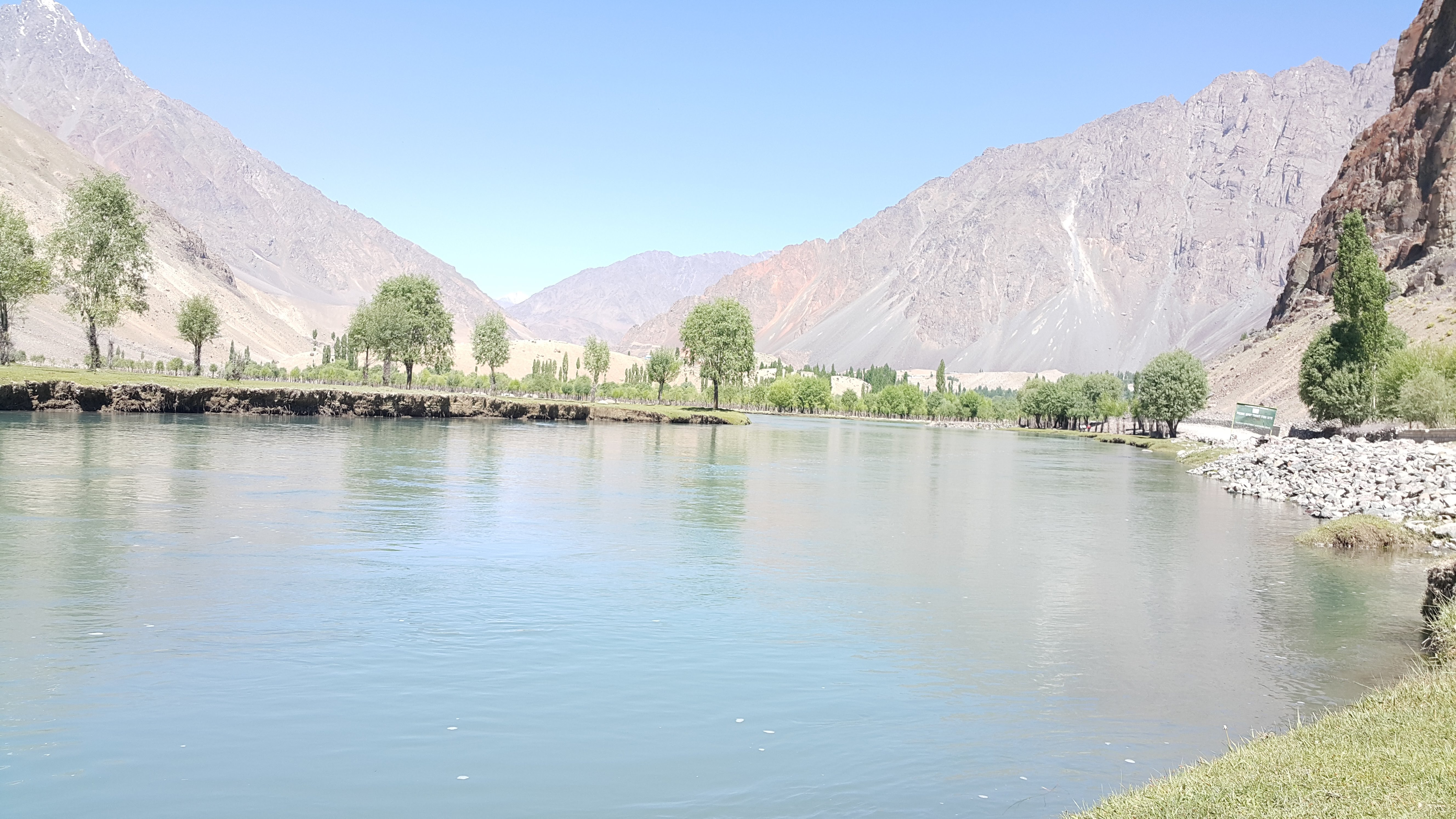
Phunder Lake in June 2017

Phander Lake is a lake and is located in Koh-i-Ghizer in Gupis-Yasin, a district of Gilgit-Baltistan. Also, the lake is called Nango Chatt. This lake is about 44 meters (144 ft) deep.

== See also ==
- Handarap Lake
- Khalti Lake
