= Evelyn Hey Cobb =

- Born: 15 September 1899; Simla, India
- Died: 25 February 1972 (aged 72); England
- Military career
- Allegiance: United Kingdom / British Empire
- Branch: (British Raj) British Indian Army
- Service years: 1919–1947
- Rank: Lieutenant-colonel
- Awards: Order of the British Empire

Lieutenant-Colonel Evelyn Hey Cobb, OBE (15 September 1899 – 25 February 1972) was an officer in the British Indian Army and served as political administrator in various capacities in North-West India. He started the tradition of holding a polo festival at Shandur.

== Early life ==
Evelyn Hey Cobb was born on 15 September 1899 at Simla, India. His father, William Hey Cobb, was a member of the Indian Civil Service, a barrister from the Inner Temple who served as city magistrate in Lucknow India. Cobb received education from Winchester College and the Cadet College, Quetta. Cobb was a well-read man who enjoyed lengthy discourse and had a love for field sports, the countryside and the mountain. He was immensely fond of hunting, fishing and polo.

== Career ==
On 15 April 1919, he was commissioned into the Indian Army, joining its 25th Cavalry. He was subsequently attached to the Kurram Militia, 19 June 1921 to 24 October 1922, attached to the South Waziristan, Scouts 27 October 1922 to 4 July 1923, then after leave from 1 January 1924 to 18 November 1924. Transfers to Foreign and Political Department of the North-West Frontier Province 20 November 1924 as personal assistant to the chief commissioner, Peshawar. He served in Chitral from 1927 to 1929 as assistant political agent.

Cobb initiated the tradition of holding a polo tournament between Chitral and Gilgit on Shandur. The practice continues till this day and draws thousands of spectators each year. Cobb also introduced the practice of playing polo in the moonlight at Shandur.

In the King's Birthday Honours (London Gazette 3 June 1935, page 3612), he was appointed an Officer of the civil division of the Order of the British Empire.

In 1937, Cobb, then a major, assumed the role of Political Agent North-West Frontier States Agency (Dir, Swat, and Chitral). In 1940 he became the political agent of North Waziristan. From 8 July 1942 to 5 September 1945, Cobb was the political agent of the Gilgit Agency. During his tenure in Gilgit he planted trout into the Yasin River. He was mad keen on polo and during his frequent visits to Hunza was instrumental in establishing a number of polo grounds in the locality.

He was promoted lieutenant-colonel 15 April 1945

== Death ==
Cobb died on 25 February 1972.
