= Shandur Polo Festival =

Annual sports festival held in Pakistan

Shandur Polo Festival شندور چوگان میلہ
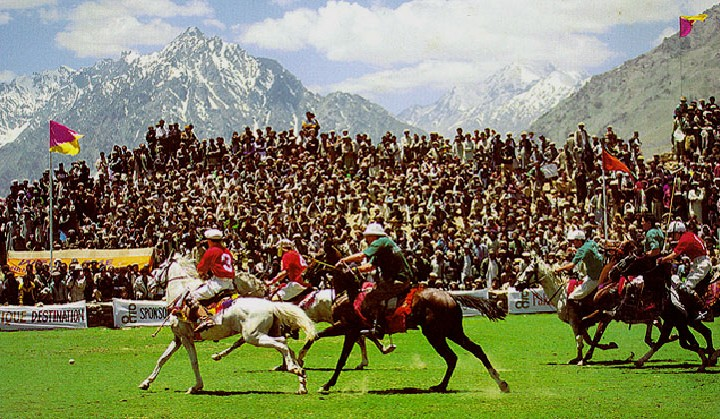
- A polo match at Shandur
- Status: Active
- Genre: Sports festival
- Begins: 7 July
- Ends: 9 July
- Frequency: Annually
- Venue: Shandur Polo Ground, Gupis-Yasin District
- Coordinates: 36.0854996°N 72.5452939°E
- Country: Pakistan
- Established: 1930
- Founder: Colonel Evelyn Hey Cobb
- Previous event: 2025
- Next event: 2026

Shandur Polo Festival (Urdu: شندور چوگان میلہ) is a sports festival held annually from 7 to 9 July at the Shandur Polo Ground in Pakistan, located at the boundary of the Gupis-Yasin and Chitral Districts. The polo tournament is played between the teams of Gilgit Baltistan and Chitral, under freestyle rules.

Organized and financed jointly by the governments of Khyber Pakhtunkhwa and Gilgit Baltistan, with the assistance from the Frontier Corps (North), the tournament is held at Shandur Polo Ground which is the world's highest polo ground at an altitude of 3,700 meters (the pass itself is at 3,800 meters). The festival also includes folk music, dancing and a camping village is set up. The polo tournament is featured in the first episode of Himalaya with Michael Palin.

== History ==
Polo is an equestrian sport first played in Central Asia in 6th century BC. Its objective was to train the cavalry and simulate a real-life battle.

Cobb was impressed by Kakakhail's resourcefulness and efficiency and wished to reward him for his service, but Kakakhail refused to accept any reward for his work. Instead, for the common benefit, Kakakhail asked Cobb to bring trout to stock the local streams. Cobb ordered live trout from England and dropped them into the Ghizer River. Due to this service, the Directorate of Fisheries was established and hundreds of people were employed. Now, the mass of those fishes in Hundarap Lake reaches 24 kg and in Khukush Lake their mass reaches 40 kg.

== Tournament format and rules ==
In The Roof of the World, Amin/Willets/Tetley write: "by comparison, an American Wild West rodeo might pass for choir practice."

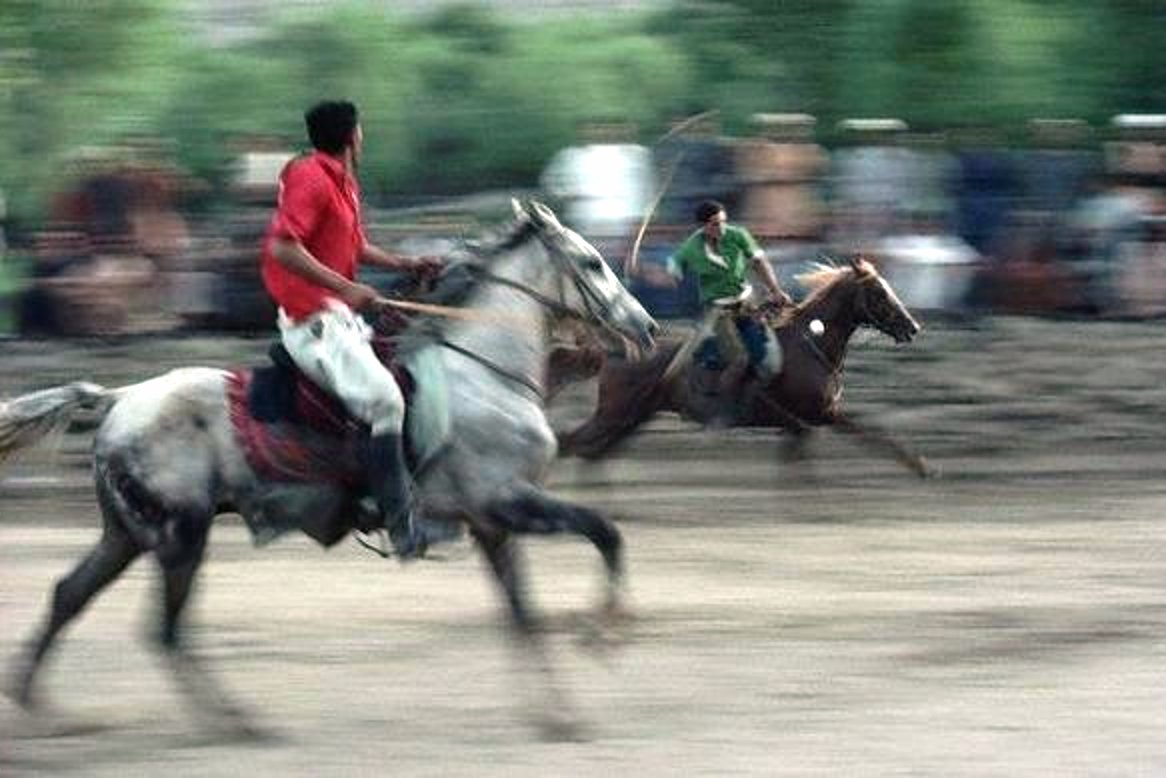
Polo in Pakistan

In order to decide the final teams to play at the Shandur Polo Festival, preliminary matches are played both in Chitral and Gilgit, in which the best horses and players are chosen for the final games by the local juries. The festival begins on 7 July. During the course of the tournament A, B, C and D teams of Chitral and Gilgit battle it out on the polo field. Each team has six members with 2 to 4 reserve players in case of injury etc. The match usually lasts one hour. It is divided into two halves, with a ten-minute interval. During intervals, the locals enthrall the audiences with traditional and cultural performances. The game is decided in favour of the team scoring more goals. The final is held on 9 July.

The field measures about 200 meters by 56 meters (a regular polo field is about 270m by 150m), with 60 cm high stone walls running the length of the field on both sides instead of boards. As six players make up one side, the field can get fairly crowded. This has the advantage of slightly slowing down the pace, which, all things considered, is probably somewhat safety-enhancing. Players rarely wear helmets, the horses' legs often have no bandages, and mallets often have no grips or straps.

== See also ==
- Lowari Pass
- Tirich Mir
