= Gupis Tehsil =

Area of northern Pakistan

The tehsil map of Gilgit-Baltistan, circa 2008

Gupis Tehsil is an administrative division (a tehsil) of Gupis-Yasin District, in Gilgit-Baltistan, a northern region of Pakistan. Gupis Tehsil lies in the southern part of the district. The tehsil includes many villages, lush green places and resort and historical places like Yangal, Sumal, Hakis, Jindrote, Dahimal, Pingal and Khasunder.

== Phander ==
Gupis-Yasin District is located in Shandur Pass which joins Chitral and Gilgit Baltistan. It also can be a path to join Tajikistan and Pakistan.

Phander Valley is well known for trout fish found in abundance. Phander includes Shamaran, Chachi, Dalimal, Gulagmuli, and Teru villages.

This area has a lake which abounds in trout. It is about 170 km from Gilgit city and the time required to get there is about 5 hours.

== Shandur Pass ==
This is a 12,500 feet high pass which connects Gilgit to Chitral. The pass remains snow-bound during winters. It is 250 km and 15 hours away by jeep.

== Administration ==
The Gupis tehsil is administratively divided into many Union Councils.
