= Khukush Lake =

- کھوکوش جھیل (Urdu); کھوکوش چھت (Khowar)
- Khukush Lake in c. 2016

- Location in Pakistan Khukush Lake (Pakistan)
- Location: Koh-i-Ghizer, Gupis–Yasin District, Gilgit–Baltistan, Pakistan
- Coordinates: 35°59′44″N 72°36′42″E
- Type: lake, reservoir
- Primary inflows: Ghizer River
- Basin countries: Pakistan
- Max. length: 5 km (16,000 ft)
- Max. width: 0.754 km (2,470 ft)
- Surface area: 2.081 km^{2} (0.803 sq mi)
- Max. depth: 240 ft (73 m)
- Frozen: November to April
- Settlements: Phander

Khūkūsh Lake (Urdu: کھوکوش جھیل; Khowar: کھوکوش چھت), also known as Baha Lake, is an alpine lake situated in the Gupis Tehsil of Gupis-Yasin District in Gilgit Baltistan, the northernmost territory of Pakistan. With a surface area of 2.081 km^{2} (0.803 sq mi) and a calculated volume of 26,000 m^{3} (920,000 cu ft), it is the third largest lake in northern Pakistan by surface area, after the Attabad and Karambar lakes.

== Location ==
Baha Lake is located in Koh-i-Ghizer of District Ghizer, Gilgit-Baltistan, Pakistan. The estimated terrain elevation above sea level is 3,622 metres (11,883 ft). The lake is oriented north–south. It can be accessed via the Karakoram Highway from Islamabad to Gilgit, and then following Gilgit-Chitral road west from Gilgit.

== See also ==
- List of lakes of Pakistan
- Bashqar Gol Lake
- Shandur Lake
