= Phander (village) =

Village in Gilgit-Baltistan, Pakistan

Phander پھنڈر
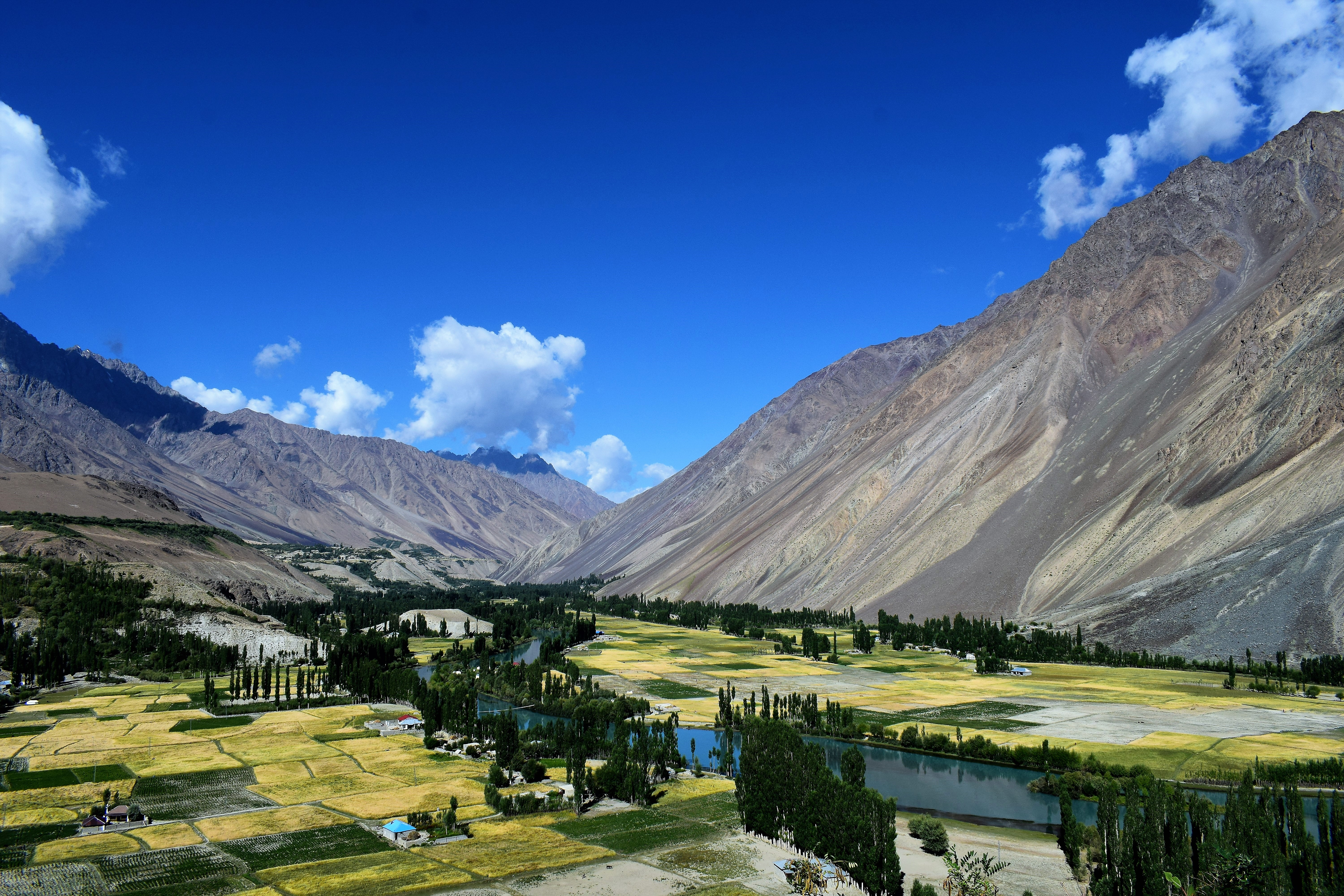
- Phander Valley

- Location of Phander in Gilgit-Baltistan Phander (Pakistan)
- Coordinates: 36°10′10″N 72°56′02″E
- Sovereign state: Pakistan
- Dependent territory: Gilgit-Baltistan
- District: Ghizer District

Phander (Urdu: پھنڈر) is the name of a village and valley in the Ghizer District located in Gilgit-Baltistan, Pakistan. The village is 184 kilometers from Gilgit on the road to the Shandur Pass, which continues on to Chitral.

There are four lakes in the valley, of which the Phander Lake is the largest. Phander is one of the few places where the Gilgit River divides into several strands as it enters the valley, which merges again upon exit from the valley.

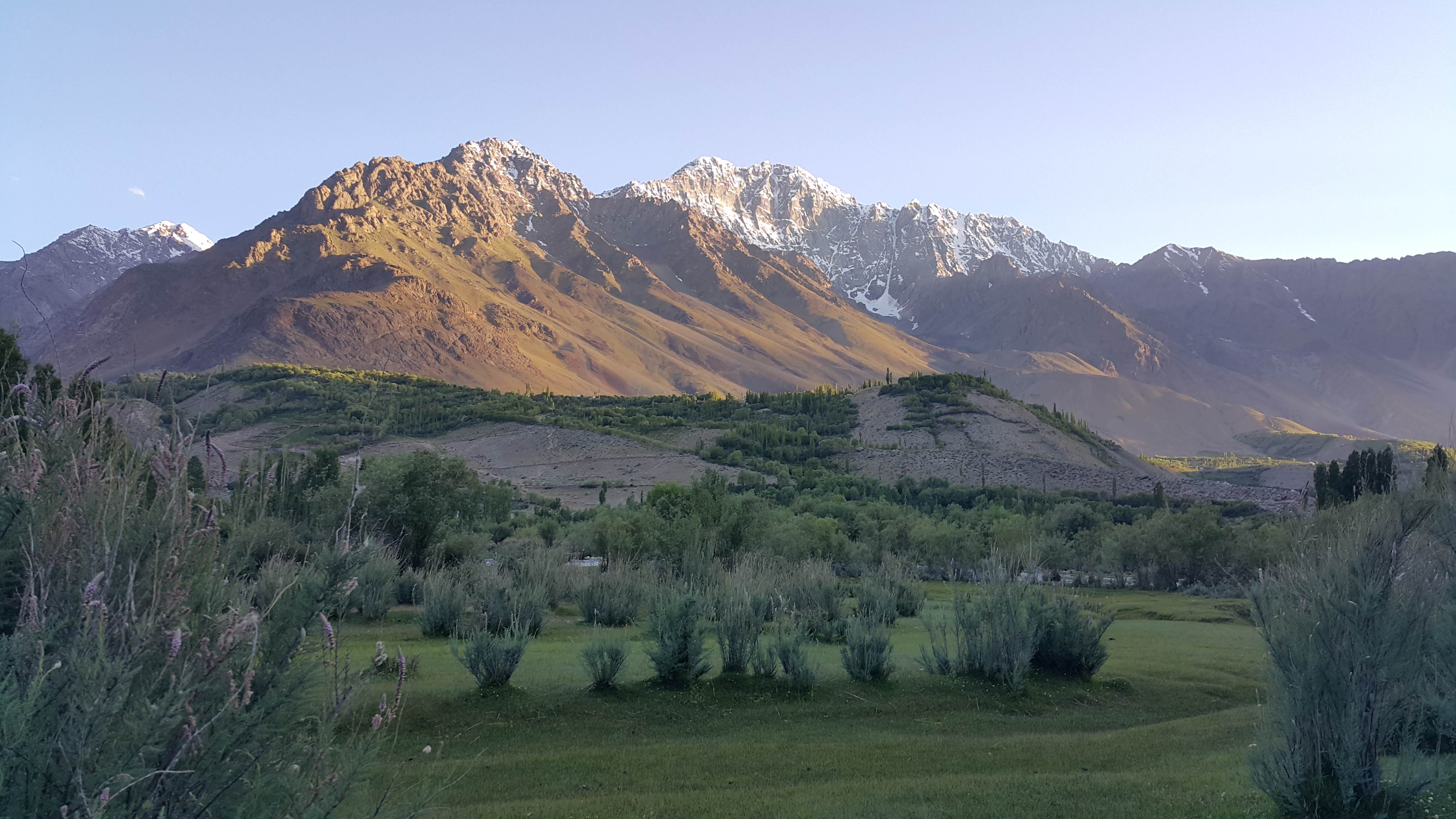
Mountains of Phander Valley
