= Karambar Lake =

Lake in Ishkoman, District Ghizer, Gilgit Baltistan, Pakistan

Karambar Lake کرمبر جھیل
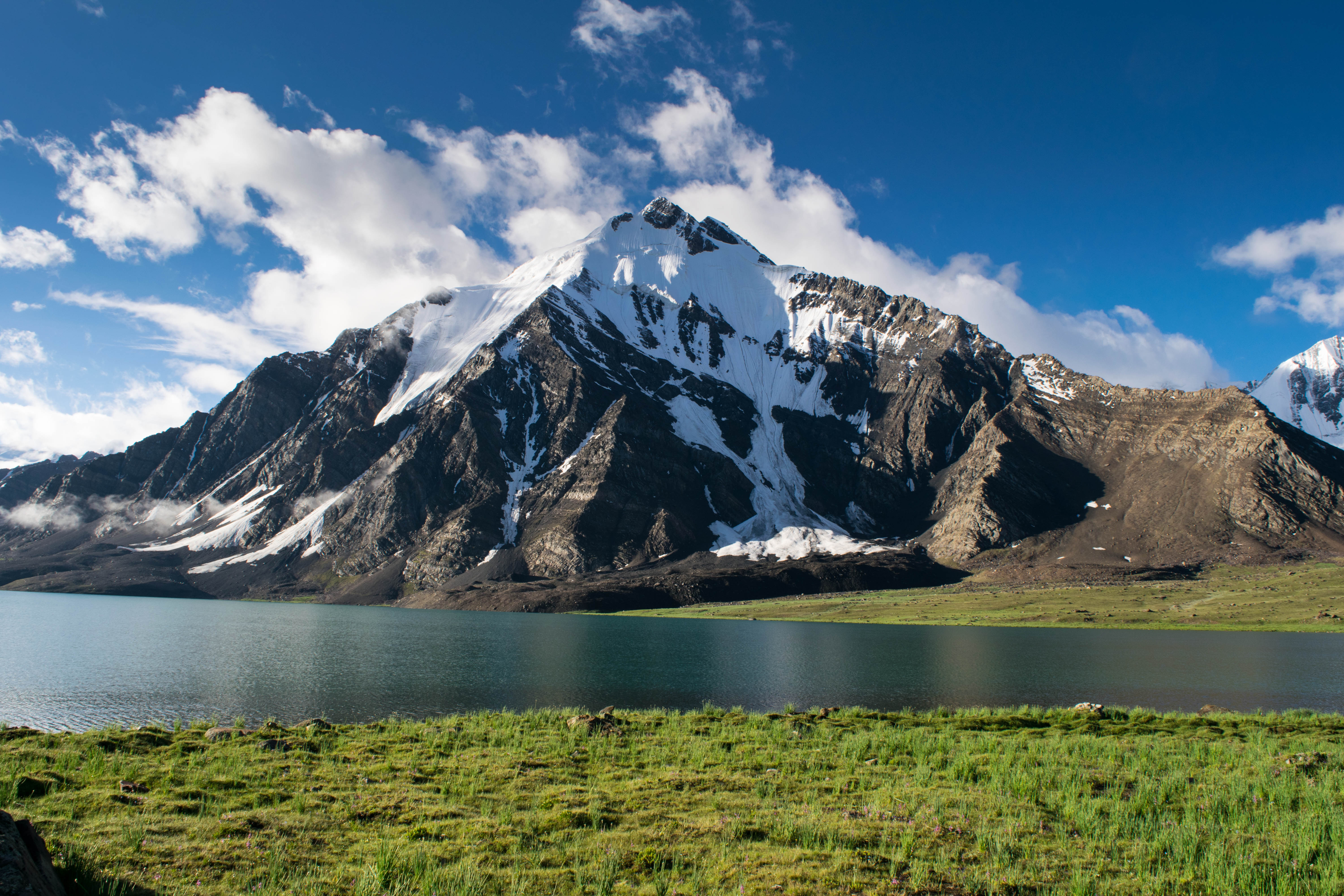
- Karambar Lake in c. 2015

- Location within Gilgit Baltistan Location within Pakistan
- Location: Ishkoman Valley, District Ghizer, Gilgit Baltistan.
- Coordinates: 36°52′51″N 73°42′19″E
- Type: Alpine glacial lake
- Primary inflows: Glacier waters
- Basin countries: Pakistan
- Max. length: 3.9 km (2.4 mi)
- Max. width: 2 km (1.2 mi)
- Surface area: 2.632 km^{2} (1.016 sq mi)
- Average depth: 52 m (171 ft)
- Surface elevation: 4,272 meters (14,016 ft)

Karambar Lake (Urdu: کرمبر جھیل; Khowar: کرمبر چھت), also known as Qurumbar Lake, is a high-altitude lake located in Ishkoman Valley, District Ghizer, Gilgit Baltistan, Pakistan. It is the 33rd highest lake in the world and lies in the Hindu Kush-Himalaya region, which is one of the world's richest biodiversity regions. With a surface area of 2.632 km^{2} (1.016 sq mi), it is the second largest lake in northern Pakistan by surface area, after Attabad Lake. Since 2011 the area surrounding the lake has been part of Qurumbar National Park.

== Hydrology ==
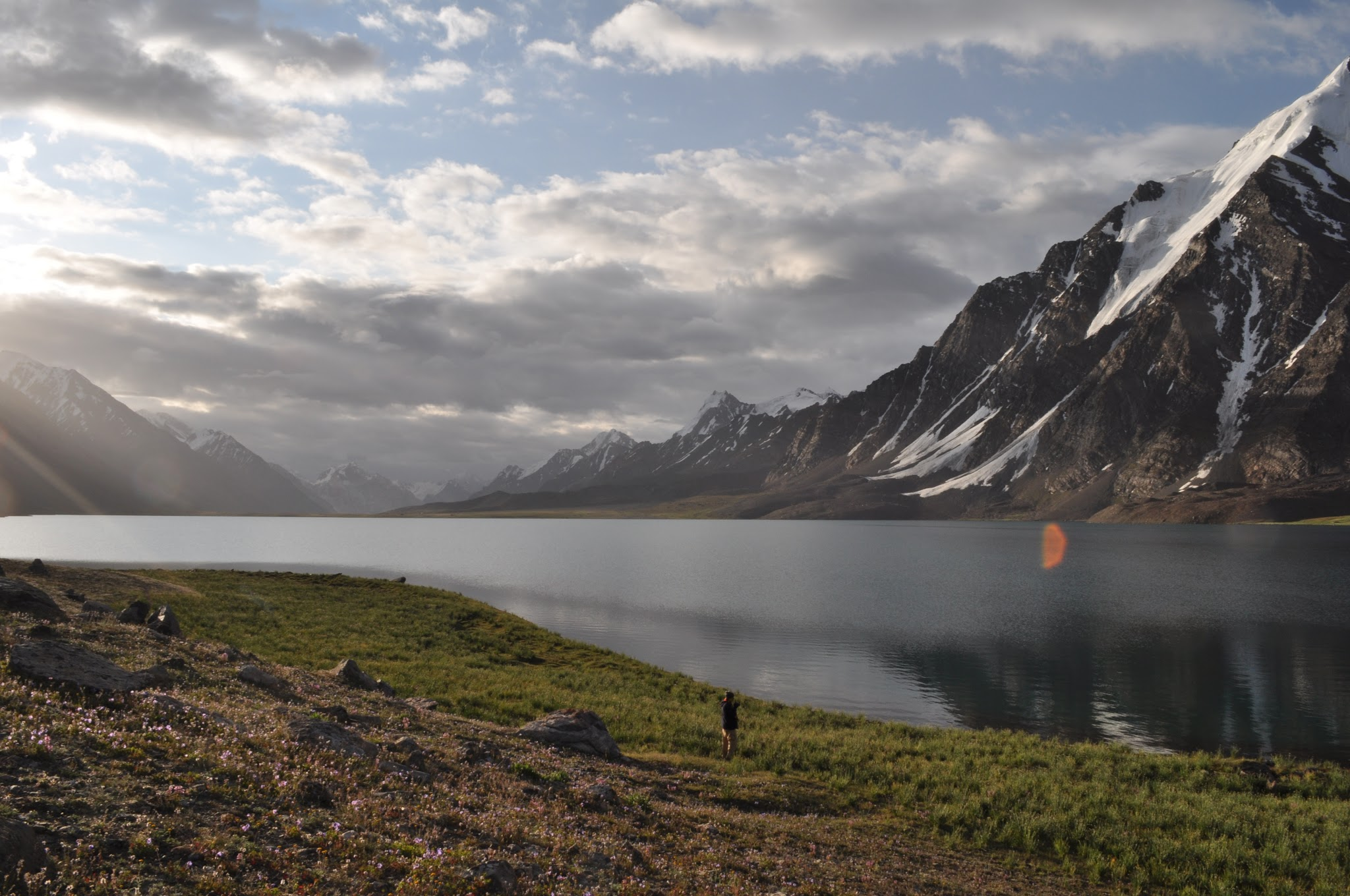
View across the lake in 2011

This glacier-fed lake is also known as Qurumbar Lake in some references and also spelled as Karomber or Karamber. The approximate length of the lake is 3.9 kilometers (2.4 mi); it is 2 kilometres (1.2 mi) across at its widest, with an average depth of 52 meters (171 ft).

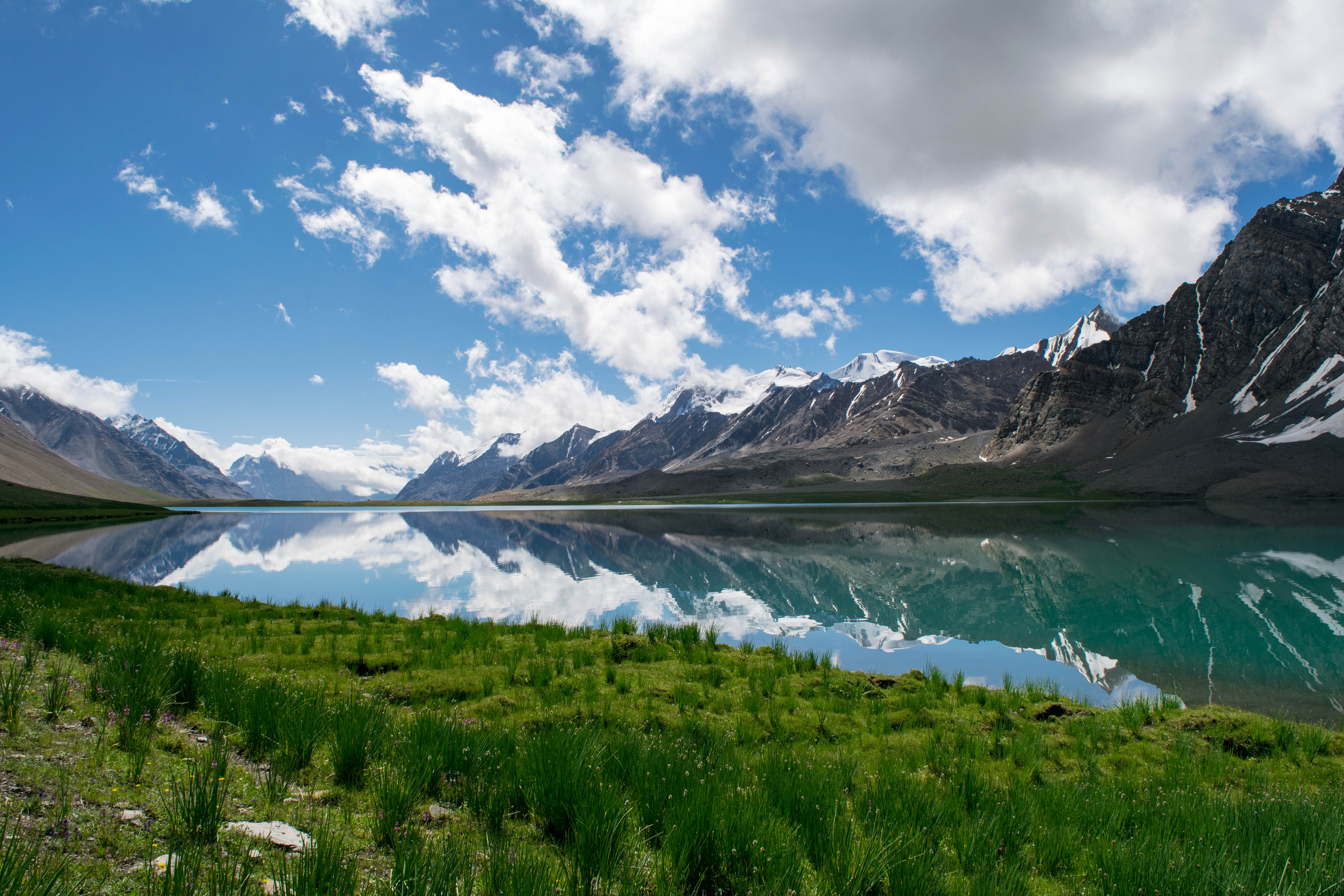
Karambar Lake in 2015

Karambar Lake is the deepest lake in the valley with a maximum and mean depth of 55m and 17.08m, respectively. Its surface area is 2.632 square kilometres (263.2 ha). Water clarity level is 13.75 (Secchi Disc Reading), which is the highest value ever recorded in the literature of lakes in Pakistan.

== See also ==
- List of lakes of Pakistan
- Khukush Lake
- Bashqar Gol Lake
- Shandur Lake
