= Gilgit River =

River in Pakistan

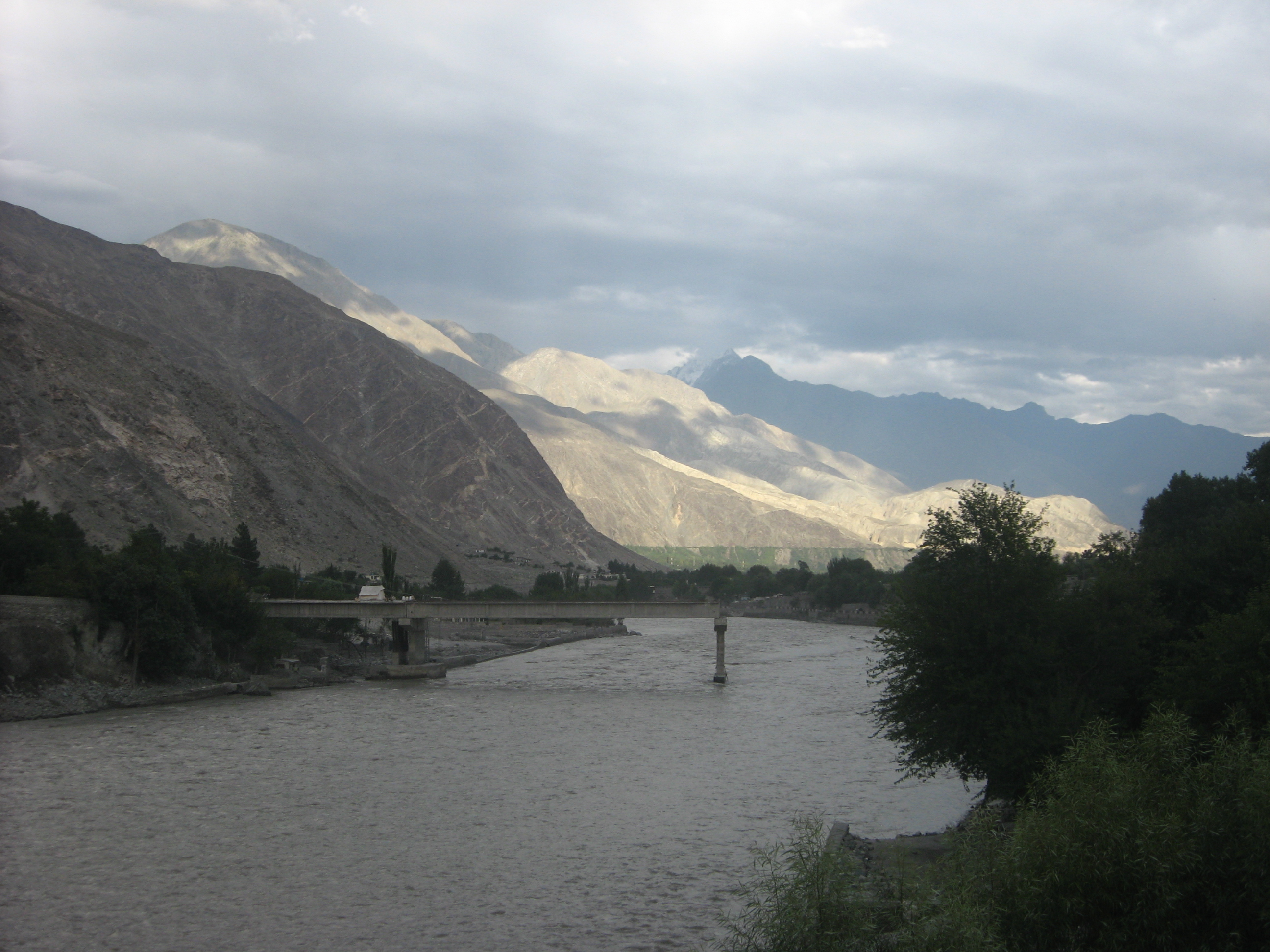

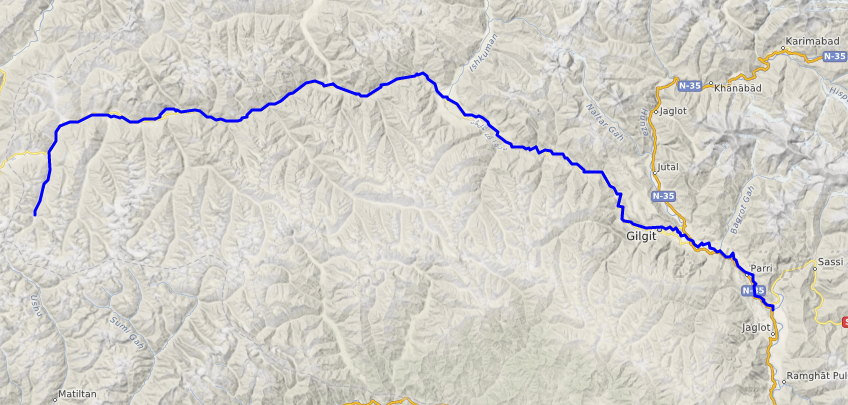
- Course of the Gilgit River
- Native name: دریائے گلگت (Urdu)

Location
- Country: Pakistan
- Autonomous territory: Gilgit-Baltistan
- Districts: Gupis-Yasin, Ghizer and Gilgit

Physical characteristics
- Mouth
  - coordinates: 35°44′31″N 74°37′29″E
- Length: 240 km (150 mi)
- Basin size: 26,159 km^{2} (10,100 sq mi)
- Discharge
  - location: Gilgit Gauging Station, Gilgit
  - average: 293 m^{3}/s (10,300 cu ft/s)
  - minimum: 83 m^{3}/s (2,900 cu ft/s)
  - maximum: 868 m^{3}/s (30,700 cu ft/s)
- Discharge
  - location: Alam Bridge Station, Jaglot
  - average: 617 m^{3}/s (21,800 cu ft/s)
  - minimum: 66 m^{3}/s (2,300 cu ft/s)
  - maximum: 4,834 m^{3}/s (170,700 cu ft/s)

Basin features
- Progression: Indus→ Arabian Sea
- Tributaries
  - right: Hunza River
- Waterbodies: Shandur Lake, Khukush Lake

The Gilgit River (Urdu: دریائے گلگت) is a tributary of the Indus River, flowing through Gilgit Valley of Gilgit-Baltistan, Pakistan. The upper sections of the Gilgit River are also referred to as the Gupis River and Ghizer River.

The Gilgit River is a tributary of the Indus River

== Course ==
Gilgit River flows through various districts including Gupis-Yasin, Ghizer and Gilgit. It originates from Shandur Lake and proceeds to join the Indus River near the towns of Juglot and Bunji. During its course, Yasin River from Yasin Valley and Karambar/Ishkoman River from Karambar Lake in Ishkoman Valley join it. Hunza River is its largest tributary, contributing over half of its mean annual volume. The confluence of Gilgit River with Indus marks the meeting point of three prominent mountain ranges: the Hindu Kush, the Himalayas, and the Karakoram.

== Hydrology ==
The catchment area of Gilgit River is 26,159 km^{2} (10,100 sq mi). Before the confluence of Gilgit River with Hunza River, its mean annual discharge for the period 1981–2010 at Gilgit Gauging Station is 293 m^{3}/s (10,300 cu ft/s), with a minimum and maximum discharge of 83 m^{3}/s (2,900 cu ft/s) and 868 m^{3}/s (30,700 cu ft/s), respectively. After receiving inflow from Hunza, its mean annual discharge for the period 1981–2015 at Alam Bridge Gauging Station was 617 m^{3}/s (21,800 cu ft/s), with a minimum and maximum discharge of 66 m^{3}/s (2,300 cu ft/s) and 4,834 m^{3}/s (170,700 cu ft/s), respectively.

== See also ==
- Shandur Pass
