= Gupis-Yasin District =

Gupis-Yasin District ضلع گوپیس یاسین
- District of Gilgit-Baltistan
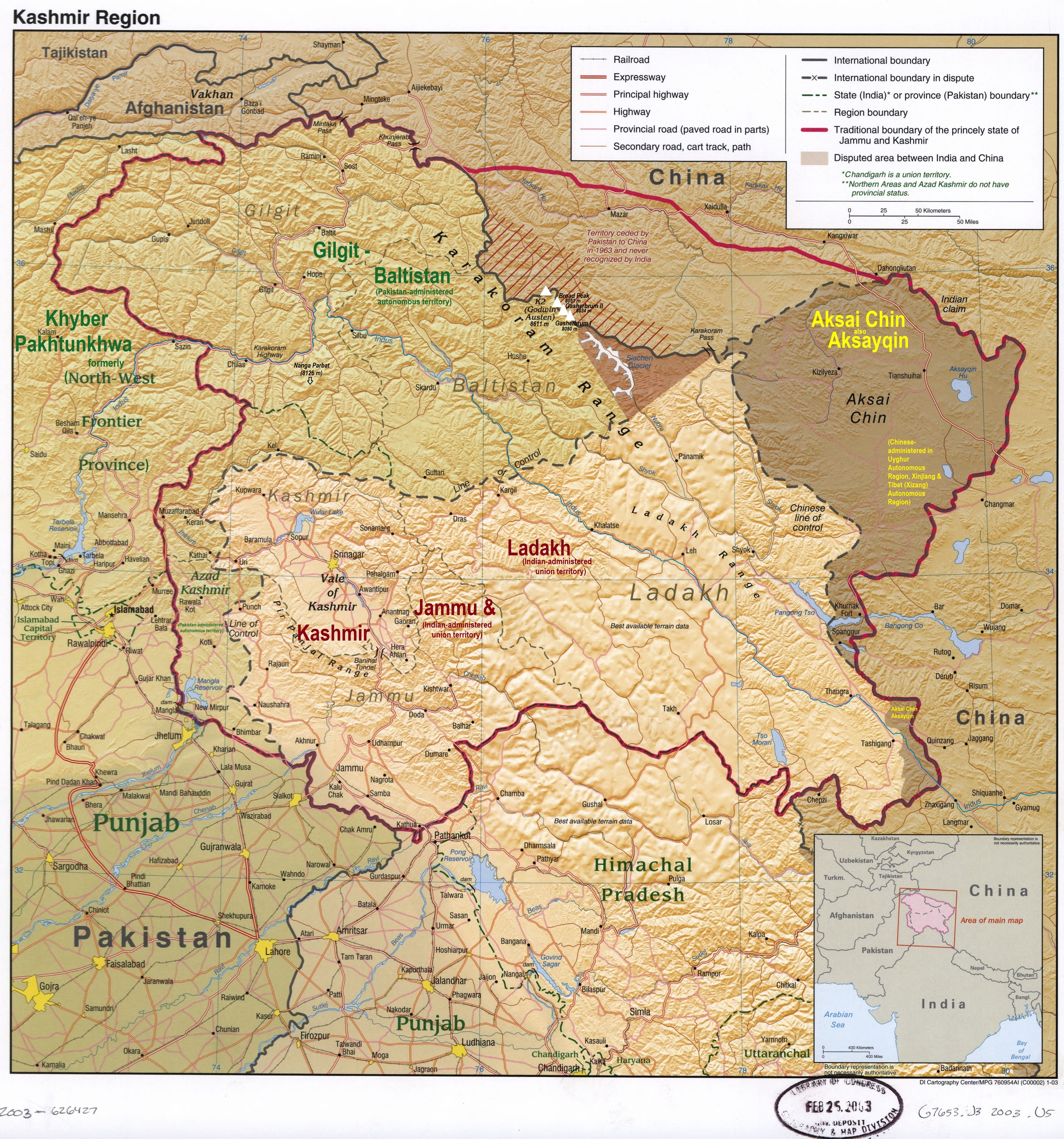
- A map showing Pakistani-administered Gilgit-Baltistan (shaded in sage green) in the disputed Kashmir region
- Interactive map of Gupis-Yasin District
- Coordinates (Phander (village)): 36°10′10″N 72°56′2″E
- Administering country: Pakistan
- Territory: Gilgit-Baltistan
- Division: Gilgit Division
- Headquarters: Phander

Government
  - Type: District Administration
  - Deputy Commissioner: N/A
  - District Police Officer: N/A
  - District Health Officer: N/A

Area (per UNOSAT)
  - Total: 7,747 km^{2} (2,991 sq mi)

Population (per UNOSAT, 2023)
  - Total: 95,575
- Number of tehsils: 3

The Gupis-Yasin District (Urdu: ضلع گوپیس یاسین) lies in the Gilgit-Baltistan region of Pakistan. It is the western most of the 14 districts in Gilgit-Baltistan.

This district was established in 2019 by merging Gupis Tehsil and the Yasin Tehsil. These two western tehsils were originally part of the larger Ghizer District but were reorganized to create the Gupis-Yasin District as a separate administrative entity within Gilgit-Baltistan.

== Geography ==
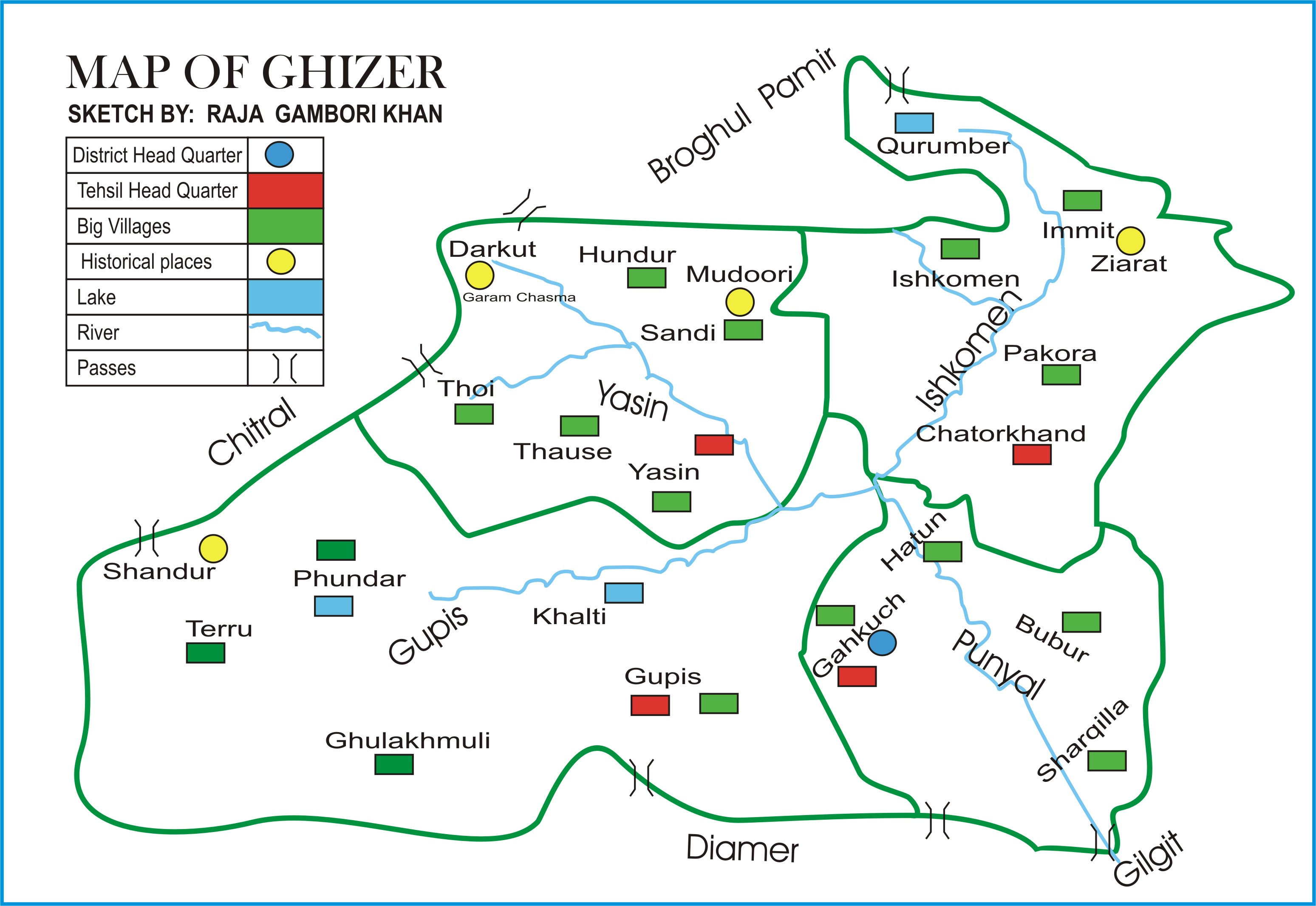
Map of the former Ghizer District showing its four tehsils, the western two of which now comprise the Gupis-Yasin District

The Gupis-Yasin District shares its boundaries with various neighboring regions. It is bordered by the Upper Chitral District of Pakistan's Khyber Pakhtunkhwa province to the north and west, the Ghizer District, to the east, and the Swat District of the Khyber Pakhtunkhwa province and the Upper Kohistan District of Khyber Pakhtunkhwa to the south.

The previous map of the Ghizer District displayed both the Yasin Tehsil and the original, larger Gupis Tehsil. However, this Gupis Tehsil was later divided into two separate tehsils. The first one is the current, smaller Gupis Tehsil, while the second is the Phander Tehsil.

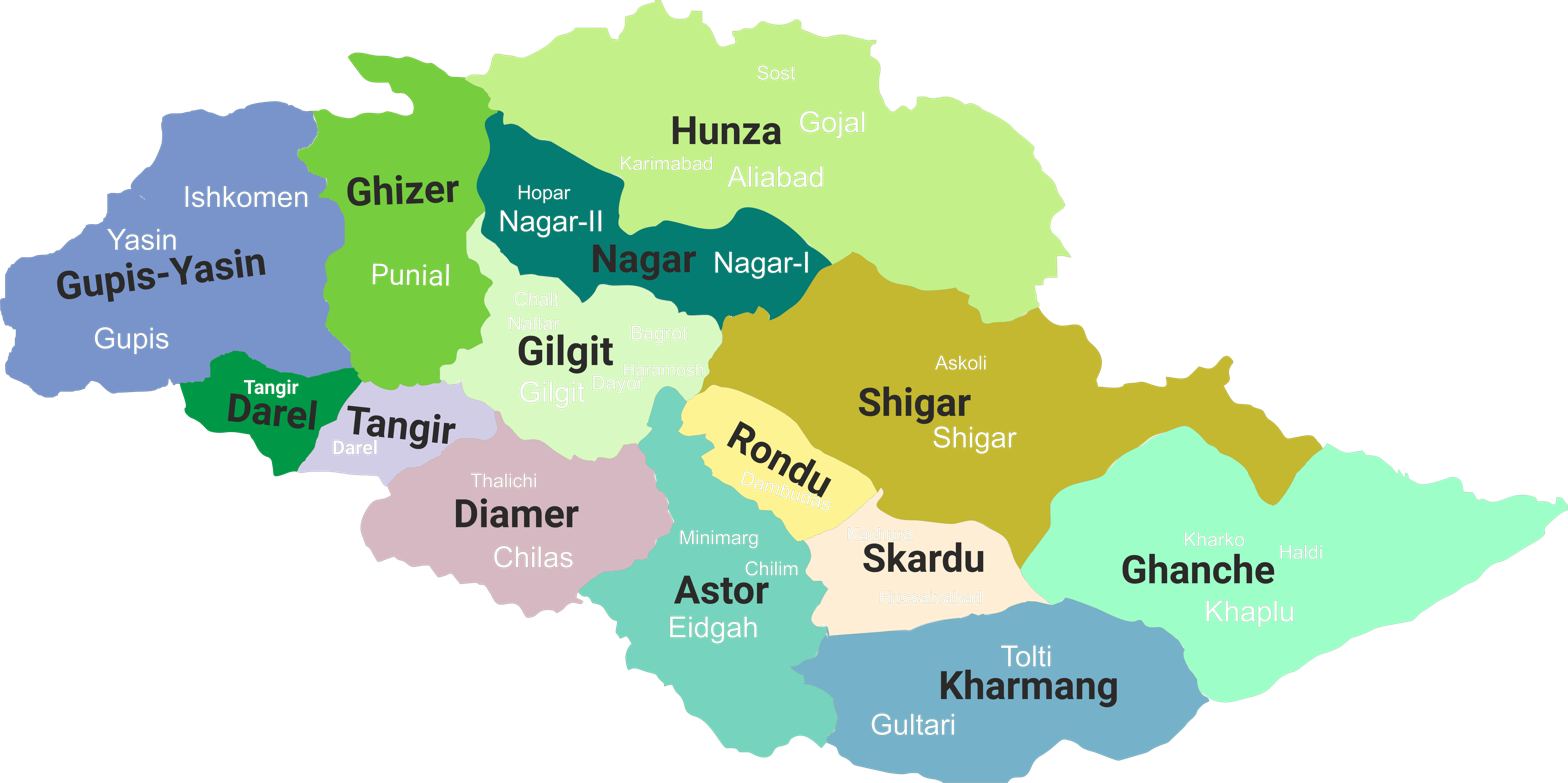
Map of Gilgit–Baltistan showing its 14 districts (Note: On the map of Gilgit-Baltistan, the Ishkoman Tehsil is wrongly shown as part of the Gupis-Yasin District.)

In its current configuration, the Ghizer District comprises the Ishkoman Tehsil and the Punial Tehsil. These administrative divisions represent the reorganization of the district, leading to the establishment of the Gupis-Yasin District as a distinct administrative entity within Gilgit-Baltistan.

== Administration ==
The Gupis-Yasin District consists of three tehsils:

- Gupis Tehsil
- Phander Tehsil
- Yasin Tehsil

The district headquarters is the town of Phander.
