= Shandur Pass =

Mountain pass in Pakistan

- شندور (Urdu)
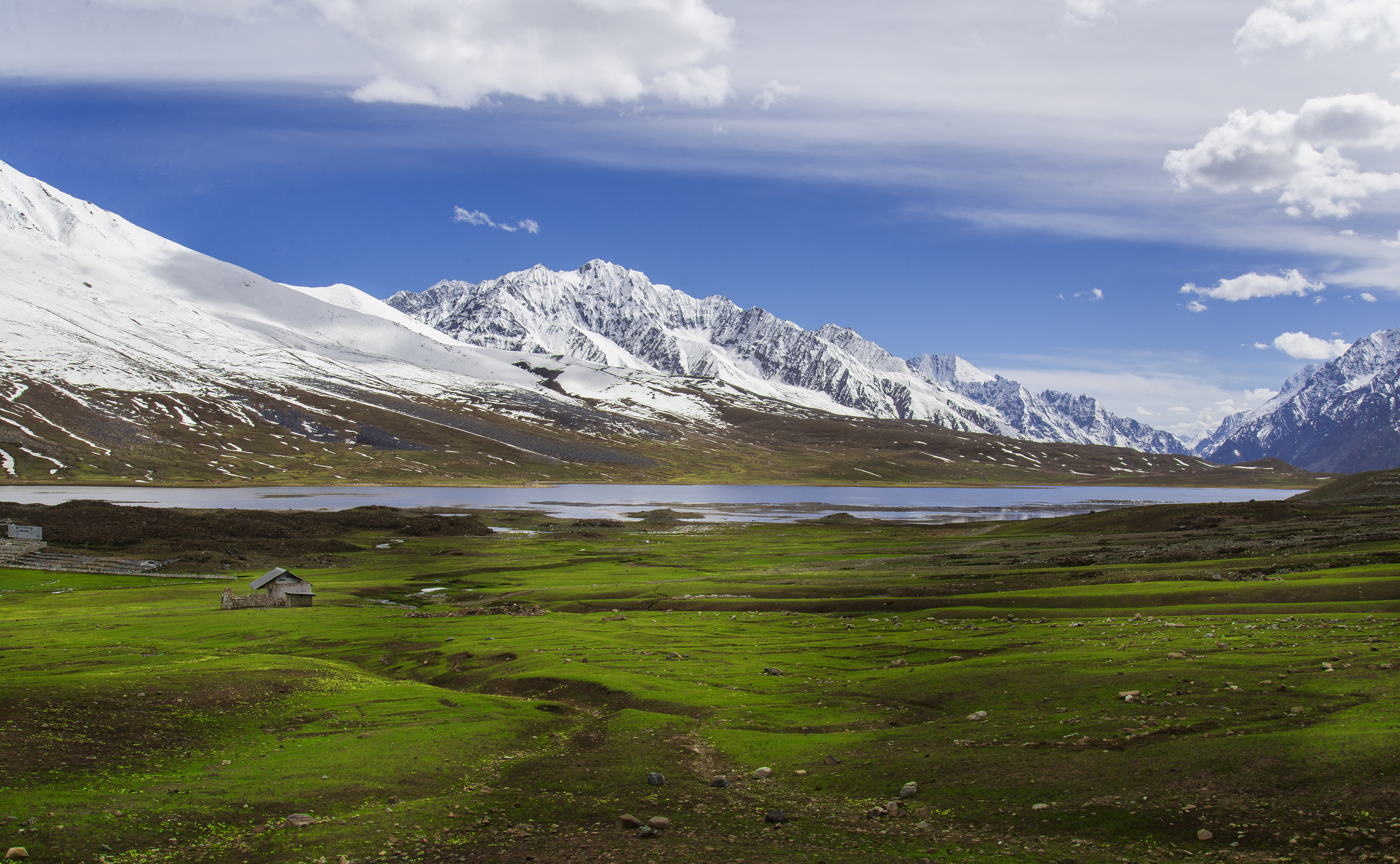
- Shandur Pass

- Location within Khyber Pakhtunkhwa Location within Gilgit Baltistan Location within Pakistan
- Elevation: 12,205 ft (3,720 m)
- Traversed by: Chitral–Shandur Road; Gilgit–Shandur Road

Location
- Location: Chitral–Gilgit-Baltistan
- Coordinates: 36°04′32″N 72°31′12″E

Shandur Pass (Urdu: شندور) is a pass located on the boundary of Upper Chitral District and Gilgit-Baltistan in Pakistan. It is located besides the Shandur Polo Ground which hosts the annual Shandur Polo Festival.

Shandur Pass is at an elevation of around 3,720 metres (12,200 ft). It connects the two regions via a road. It is 212 km away from Gilgit.

== See also ==
- Shandur National Park
- Shandur Lake
- Gilgit River

== Books ==
- The Gilgit Game by John Keay (1985) ISBN 0-19-577466-3
- The Kafirs of the Hindukush (1896) Sir George Scott Robertson.
- To the Frontier (1984) Geoffrey Moorehouse, pp. 267–270. Hodder and Stoughton Ltd., Great Britain. Reprint: Sceptre edition 1988. ISBN 0-340-41725-0
- Shandur, Durand's Boundary Line Violation (2014) by Rai Sarfaraz Shah, Ex-MNA LC Gilgit-Baltistan
