= Shandur Lake =

Lake in Gilgit Baltistan, Pakistan

Shandur Lake شندور جھیل
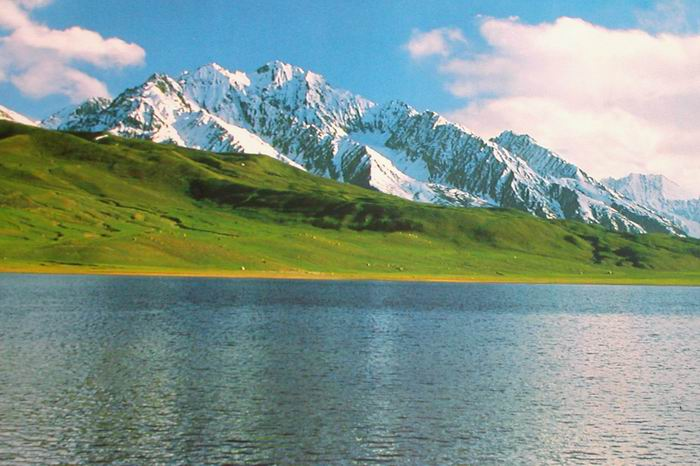
- Shandur Lake

- Location within Gilgit Baltistan Location within Pakistan
- Location: District Ghizer, Gilgit Baltistan.
- Coordinates: 36°04′42″N 72°32′20″E
- Type: Alpine glacial lake
- Primary inflows: Glacier waters
- Primary outflows: Gilgit River
- Basin countries: Pakistan
- Surface area: 1.428 km^{2} (0.551 sq mi)

Shandur Lake (Urdu: شندور جھیل; Khowar: شندور چھت), also known as Hundrup Lake, is a high-altitude lake located in Shandur-Hundrup National Park, Gilgit-Baltistan, Pakistan. It is located in between the Shandur Pass and Shandur Polo Ground, and is a primary source of origin for Gilgit River. It is the 5th largest lake in northern Pakistan by surface area.

Shandur Ice Sports Challenge is held at the Lake from December 24 to 28, and features ice hockey and speed skating, between the teams of Chitral and Gilgit Baltistan.

== Gallery ==
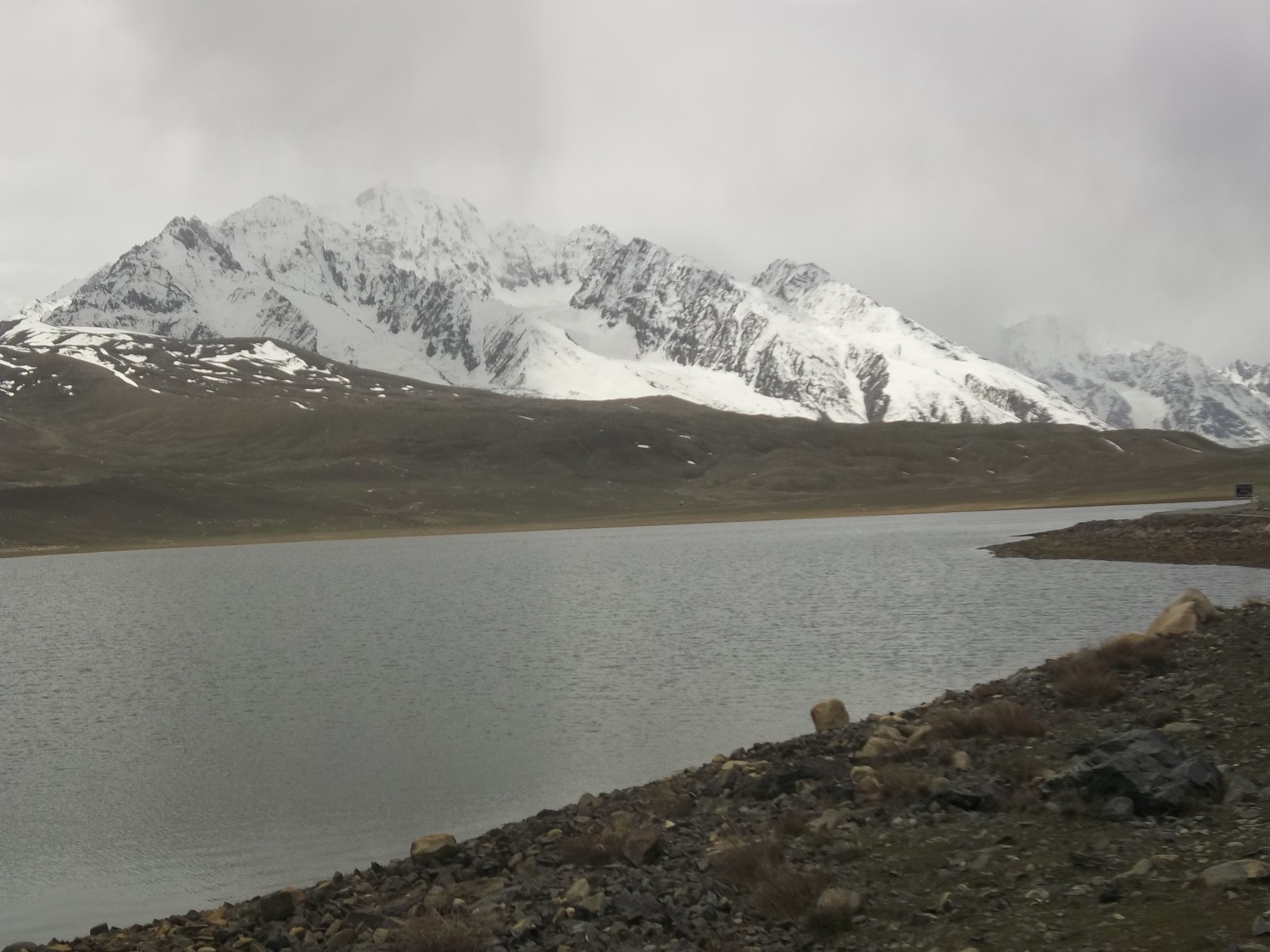
Shandur Lake in Winter

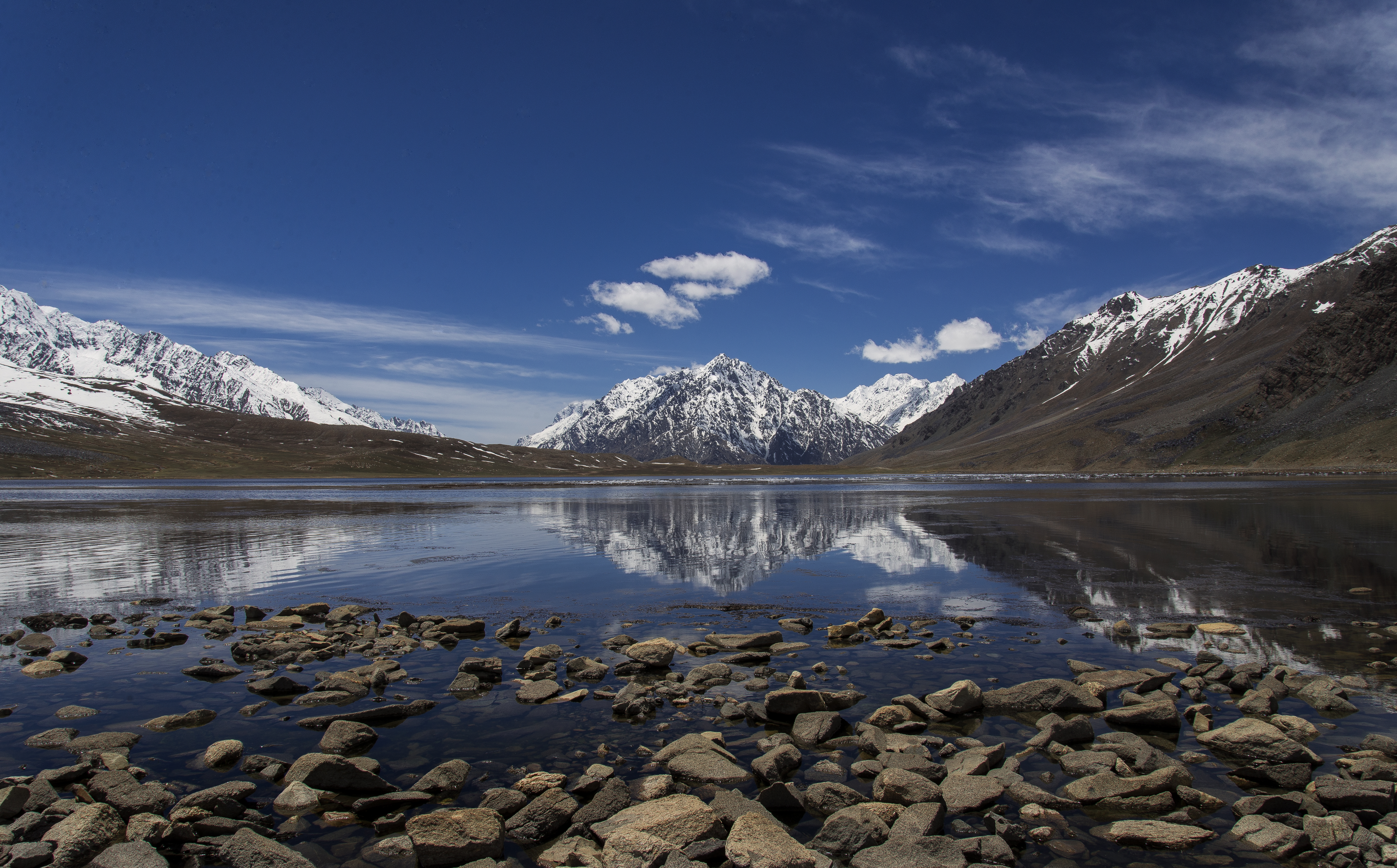
Reflection of mountains in Shandur Lake

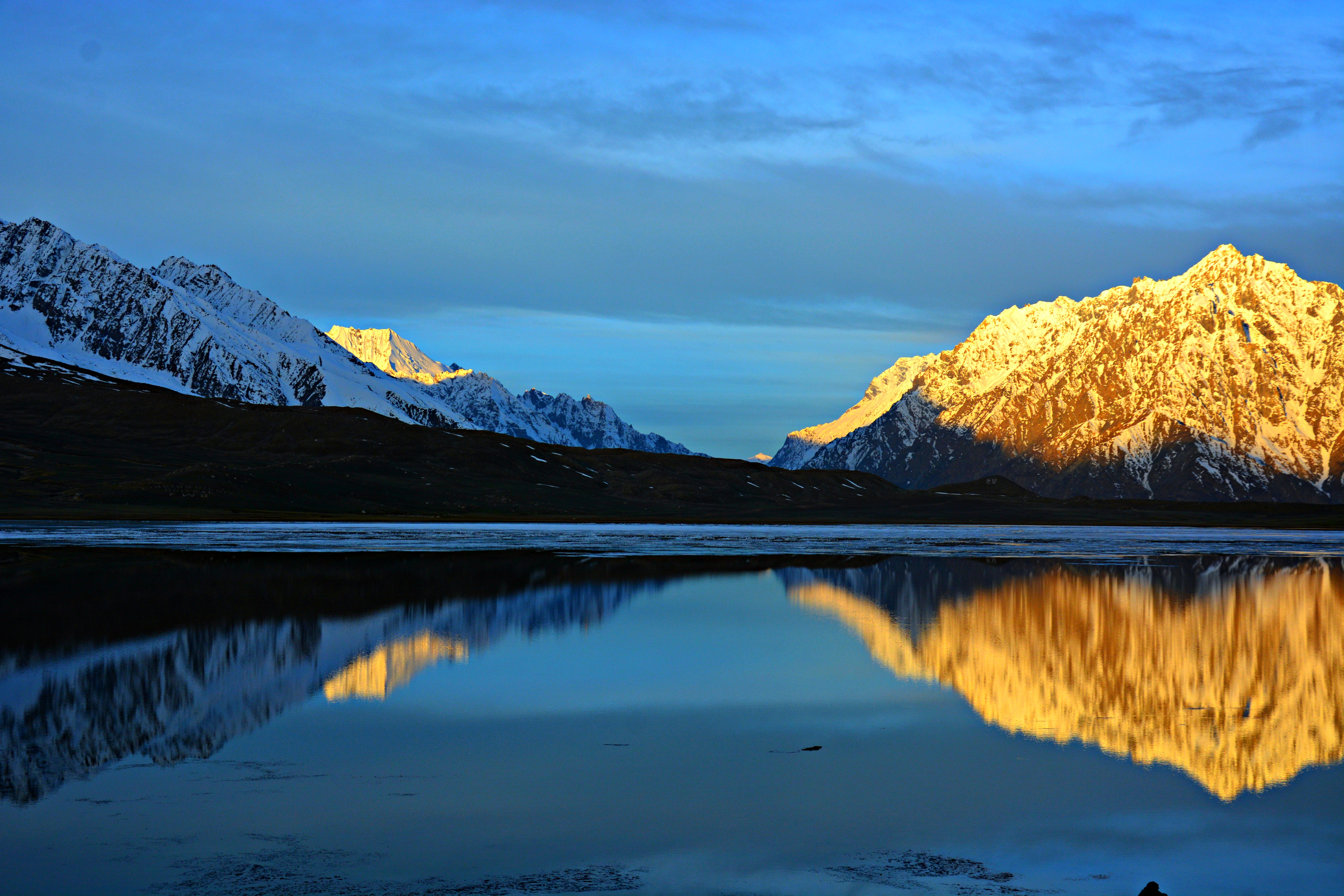
Sunrise at Shandur Lake

== See also ==
- List of lakes of Pakistan
- Attabad Lake
- Karambar Lake
- Khukush Lake
- Bashqar Gol Lake
