= Old British Cemetery (Gilgit) =

Cemetery in Gilgit–Baltistan, Pakistan

Old British Cemetery گورا ‍قبرستان
- Interactive map of Old British Cemetery گورا ‍قبرستان

Details
- Established: 18 July 1870
- Location: Gilgit, Gilgit–Baltistan
- Country: Pakistan
- Coordinates: 35.922°N 74.305°E
- Type: Christian
- No. of graves: 18

The Old British Cemetery (Shina: گورا ‍قبرستان) is a graveyard in Gilgit, Gilgit–Baltistan, Pakistan. It was first established in July 1870 in the British Raj's Gilgit Agency, when it came to be known as "Hayward's Garden" in memory of British explorer George W. Hayward, who was the first person to be laid to rest there. Before this, it was known as the "Jawahir Singh Bagh" (Urdu: جواہِر سِنگھ باغ) during the Dogra Raj.

== Location ==
The graveyard is compounded on one side that is towards the main road, and fenced with barbed wire. It is located near Shahi Pologround, found along Khazana Road in the direction of Barmas. The cemetery is also a foreign tourist attraction.

== History ==
In July 1870, during his journey to explore the Pamir Mountains, the British explorer Lt. George W. Hayward was allegedly murdered by a local tribesman near the Darkot Pass in Ghizer (then part of the princely state of Kashmir). The following morning, he was discovered dead under the shade of a tree. On 18 July 1870, his dead body was brought to Gilgit and buried in an orchard. With time, the orchard received more burials and subsequently became a regulated place of burial for British nationals. The location of the cemetery underwent various name changes throughout history, such as Hayward Garden, Christian Cemetery and Jawahir Singh Bagh. The cemetery was renovated in 2002 by the Pakistani government with full sponsorship from the United Kingdom.

== Buried ==
The cemetery contains 18 graves and among the buried are explorer Lt. George Hayward, political agents Maj. Arthur Francis and Lt. Henry Gordon Bell as well as various tourists and travellers who died during their stay in the region before the agency's dissolution.

== See also ==
- Gilgit Chinese Memorial Cemetery (Danyor)
