= Broghil Valley National Park =

National park in Pakistan

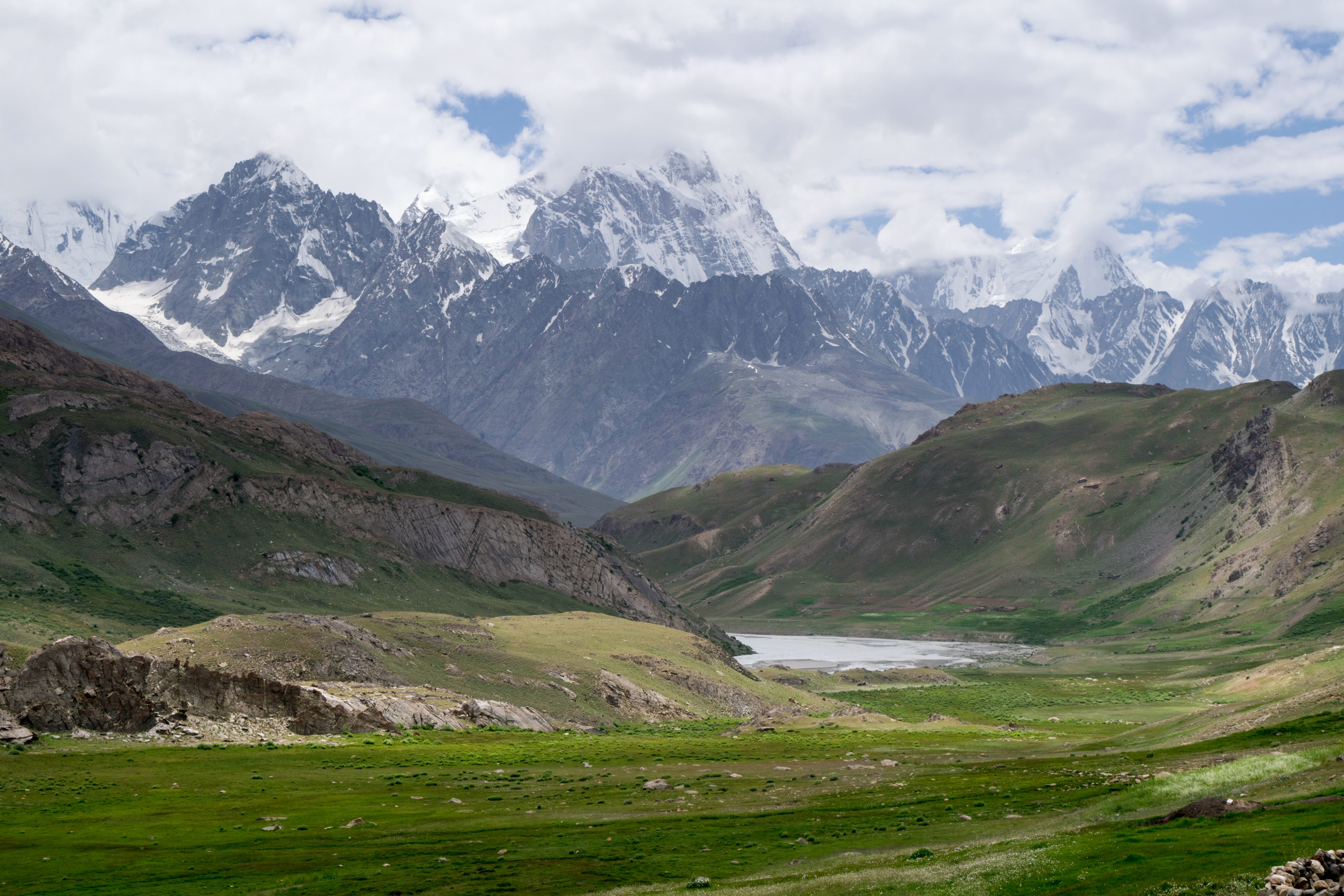
- Broghil Valley photographed c. 2016

- Location within Khyber Pakhtunkhwa Location within Gilgit Baltistan Location within Pakistan
- Location: Upper Chitral, Khyber Pakhtunkhwa, Pakistan
- Nearest city: Chitral
- Coordinates: 36°45′N 73°30′E
- Area: 1,348 km^{2} (520 sq mi)
- Elevation: 3,000 metres (9,800 ft)
- Established: 2010

Broghil Valley National Park (Urdu: بروغل) is located in the extreme northern reaches of the Upper Chitral District in Khyber Pakhtunkhwa, Pakistan, close to the Pak–Afghan border. It lies around the Mountains of Central Asia biodiversity hotspot.

== Geography ==
Broghil Valley National Park abbreviated as BVNP, lies 250 kilometres (160 mi) from the main city of Chitral and is the northernmost valley within the Upper Chitral district. Broghil Valley borders the Gilgit-Baltistan to west and the Wakhan corridor in Afghanistan to north, which stretches between Tajikistan and Pakistan. It is adjacent to the Qurumbar National Park in Gilgit-Baltistan.

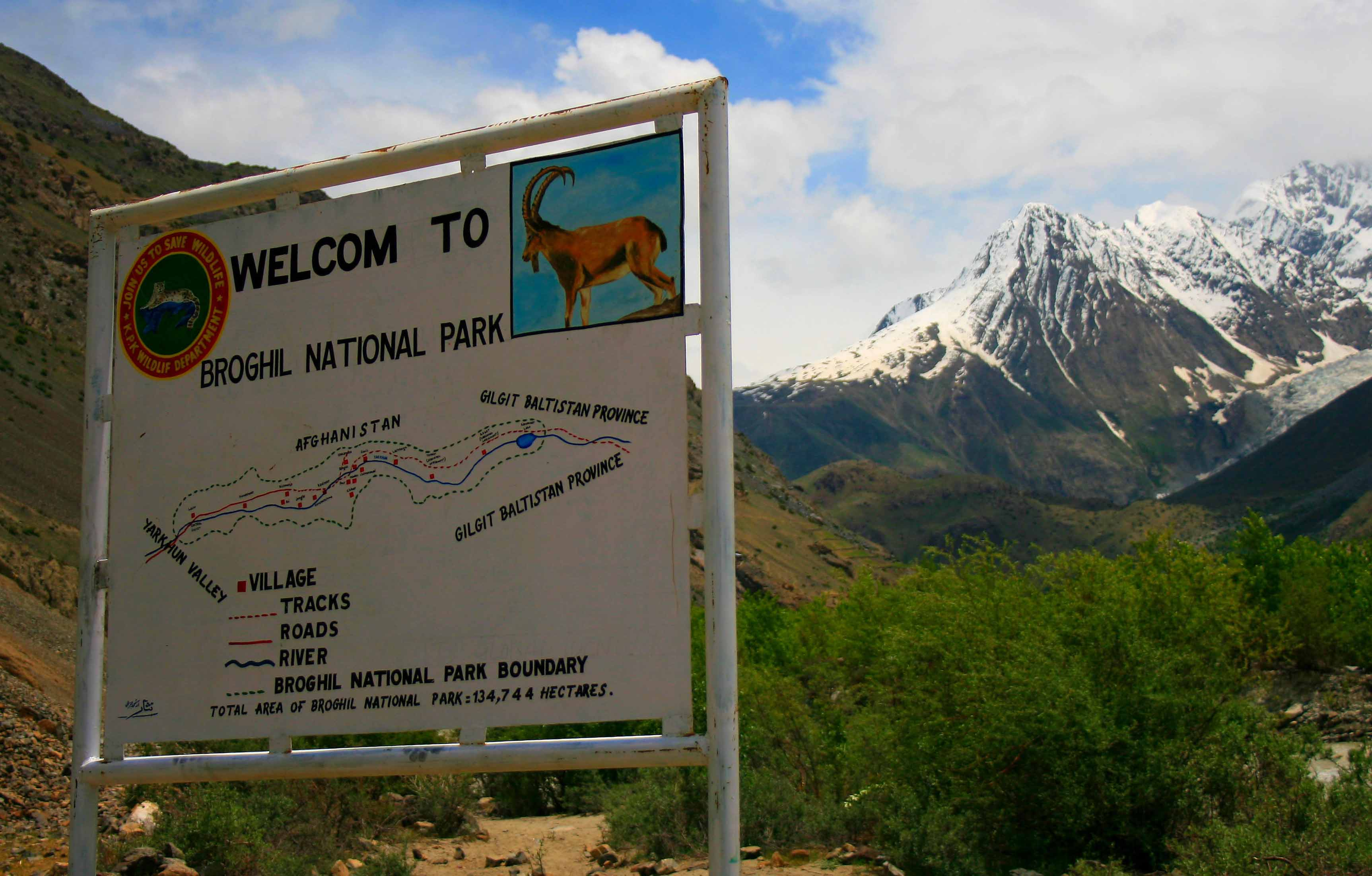
Welcome board near the entrance to the park

The area is mostly mountainous. The elevation of the national park ranges from 3,217 m (10,554 ft) to 5,696 m (18,688 ft) above the sea level. The terrain is undulating with mountains, grassy plains, and valleys. It includes almost 3,400 ha of peatlands and lakes. The valley features around 30 freshwater lakes and is surrounded by glaciers and mountains.

== Tourism ==
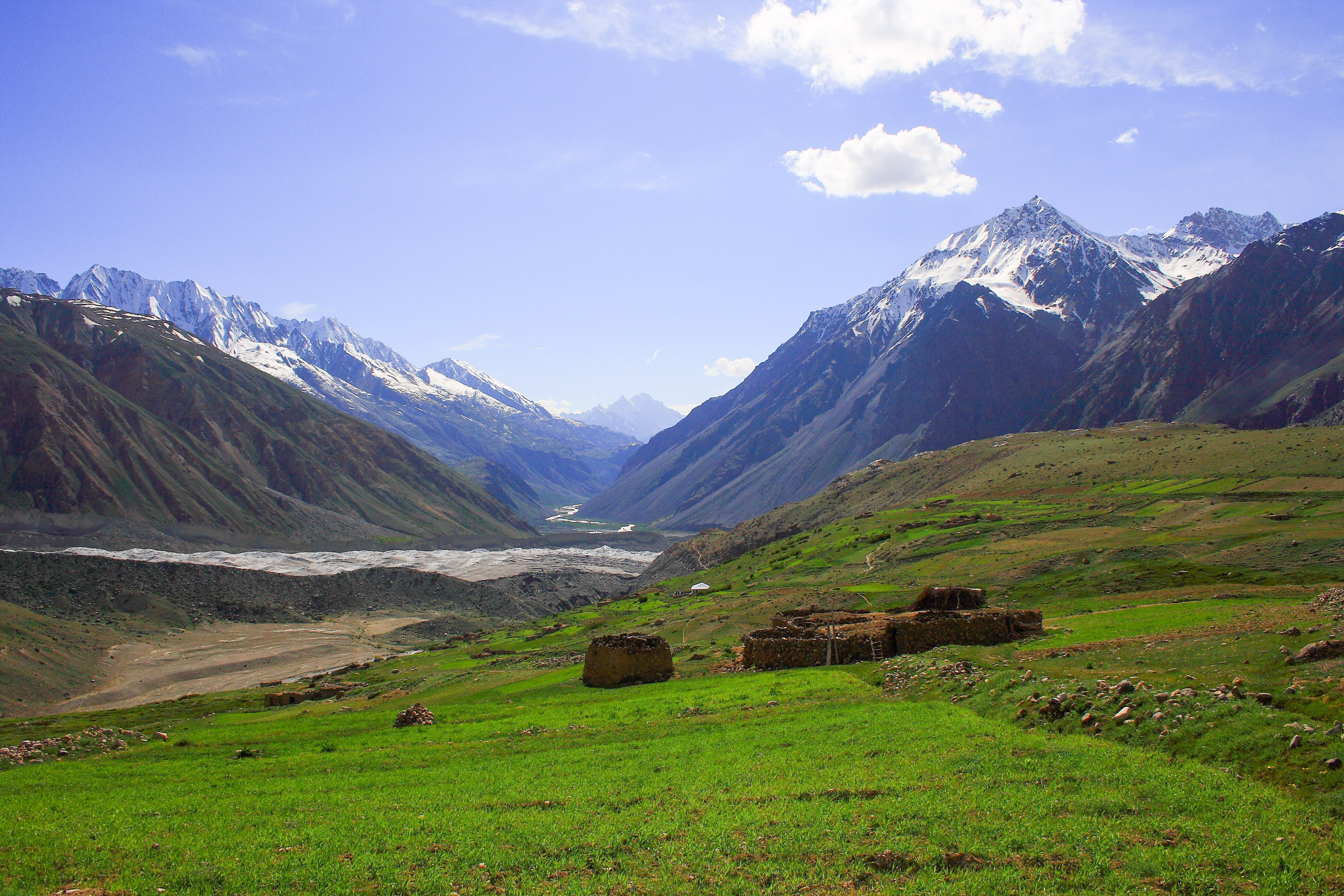
The Chikaar region of the valley.

The remote location of the Broghil Valley makes it a hard-to-reach the tourist destination. Many communities in Broghil lack access to basic facilities and services. The annual Broghil Festival attracts visitors, however it lacks basic road and hospitality infrastructure. Attendees enjoy attractions and activities such as yak polo and exhibitions of woolen handicrafts, accompanied by traditional food and music. However, a recently constructed 32 km (20 mi) road by Aga Khan Rural Support Programme, connects Kishmanja village of the park to other villages such as Pechus and Vedin Khot and other areas. During their five-day tour to Pakistan in the mid-October 2019, the British royals, Prince William and his wife Catherine, Princess of Wales visited the park.

== Demographics ==
People inhabiting the regions of the valley belong to Wakhi, Kyrgyz and Sarikoli ethnicities, whom have been settled here over hundreds of years.

== Flora and Fauna ==
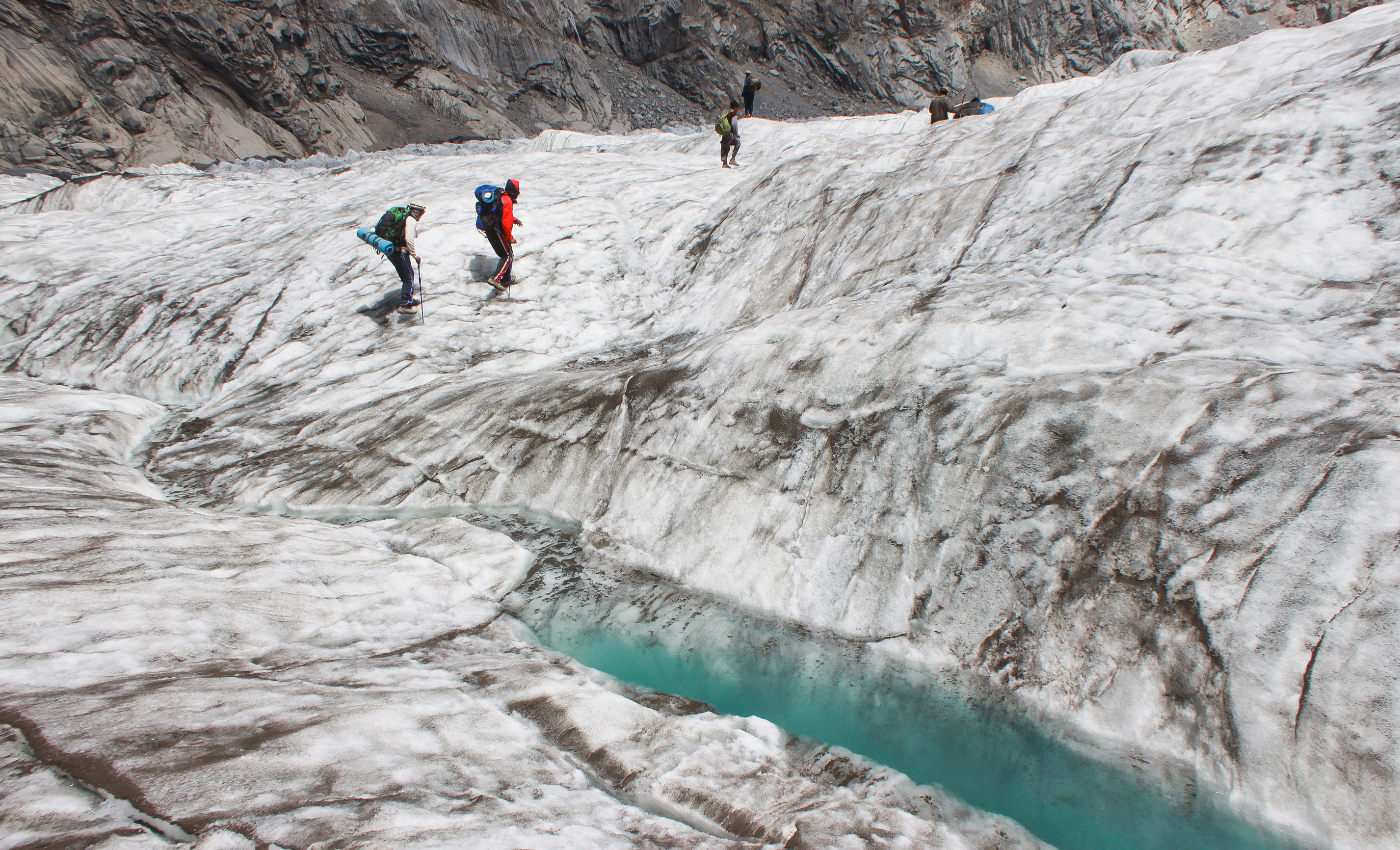
A view of Chiatibo Glacier of the national park in 2014.

Spread across the grassy plains are scrubs and common plants include Webb's rose, Artemisia brevifolia, and Artemisia maritima. The forests are mainly dominated by Juniperus species and Betula. 23 mammals, 120 birds, 3 reptiles, and 1 amphibian species have been confirmed.

=== Mammals ===
- Siberian ibex, C.s.sakeen
- Bharal, P.n.nayaur
- Marco Polo sheep, O.a.polii
- Himalayan musk deer, M.leucogaster
- Persian leopard, P.p.saxicolor
- Snow leopard, P.uncia
- Turkestan lynx, L.l.isabellinus
- Leopard cat, P.b.bengalensis
- Himalayan wolf, C.l.chanco
- Golden jackal, C.a.indica
- Red fox, V.v.montana
- Himalayan brown bear, U.t.isabellinus
- Long-tailed marmot, M.c.aurea
- Pale gray shrew, C.pergisea

=== Himalayan birds ===
- Chukar partridge, Alectoris chukar
- Snow partridge, Lerwalerwa
- Himalayan snowcock, Tetrogallus himalayanus
- Golden eagle, Aquila chrysaetos daphanea
- Bearded vulture, Gypaetus barbatus
- Snow pigeon, Columba leuconota

=== Herpeto-fauna ===
- Chitral gecko, Cyrtodactylus walli
- Plump banded gecko, Cyrtodactylus dattanensis
- Caucasian agama, Paralaudakia caucasia
- Baltistan toad, Bufo latastii

== See also ==
- Broghil Pass
- Darkot Pass
- List of valleys in Pakistan
