= Yak dance =

Asian folk dance

Yak dance or Yak Chham or Tibetan Yak Dance is an Asian folk dance performed in the Indian states Arunachal Pradesh, Sikkim, union territory Ladakh and in the southern fringes of the Himalayas near Assam.

The dancer impersonating yak dances with a man mounted on his back. The masked dancer represents the family members (Theopa Gali), who are believed to have discovered the Yak with the help of a magical bird hundreds of years ago. Yak dance is performed to honour the Yak, during the Losar festival, the Tibetan New Year.

In 2017, the tableaux of Arunachal Pradesh depicted the Yak dance at the 68th Republic Day of India celebration at Rajpath, New Delhi. Yak Dance is one of the most famous pantomimes of the Mahayana sect of Buddhist Tribes of Arunachal Pradesh. It also won first prize as the best Tableau among 22 other participants in 2017 Republic Day.
