= Elephant beauty pageant =

Annual elephant beauty contest held in Nepal

The elephant beauty pageant is an annual event held in Chitwan National Park, Nepal to select the most beautiful female elephant. The main aim of the competition is to enhance the bonding between elephants and humans. The event acts as a major tourist attraction in the national park. The event was started in 2010.

== Winners ==
- 2023, Selfiekali, 17 years old. Selected for her vibrant colours and her moves, she won NPR 15000 cash prize. Rimjhimkali, 11 year old elephant, was the first runner up, and Sambridikali was the second runner up.
- 2020, Buffkali, 35 years old
- 2019, Champakali, 32 years old
- 2018, Bijulikali, 18 years old
- 2017, Pujakali

== See also ==
- Elephant polo
