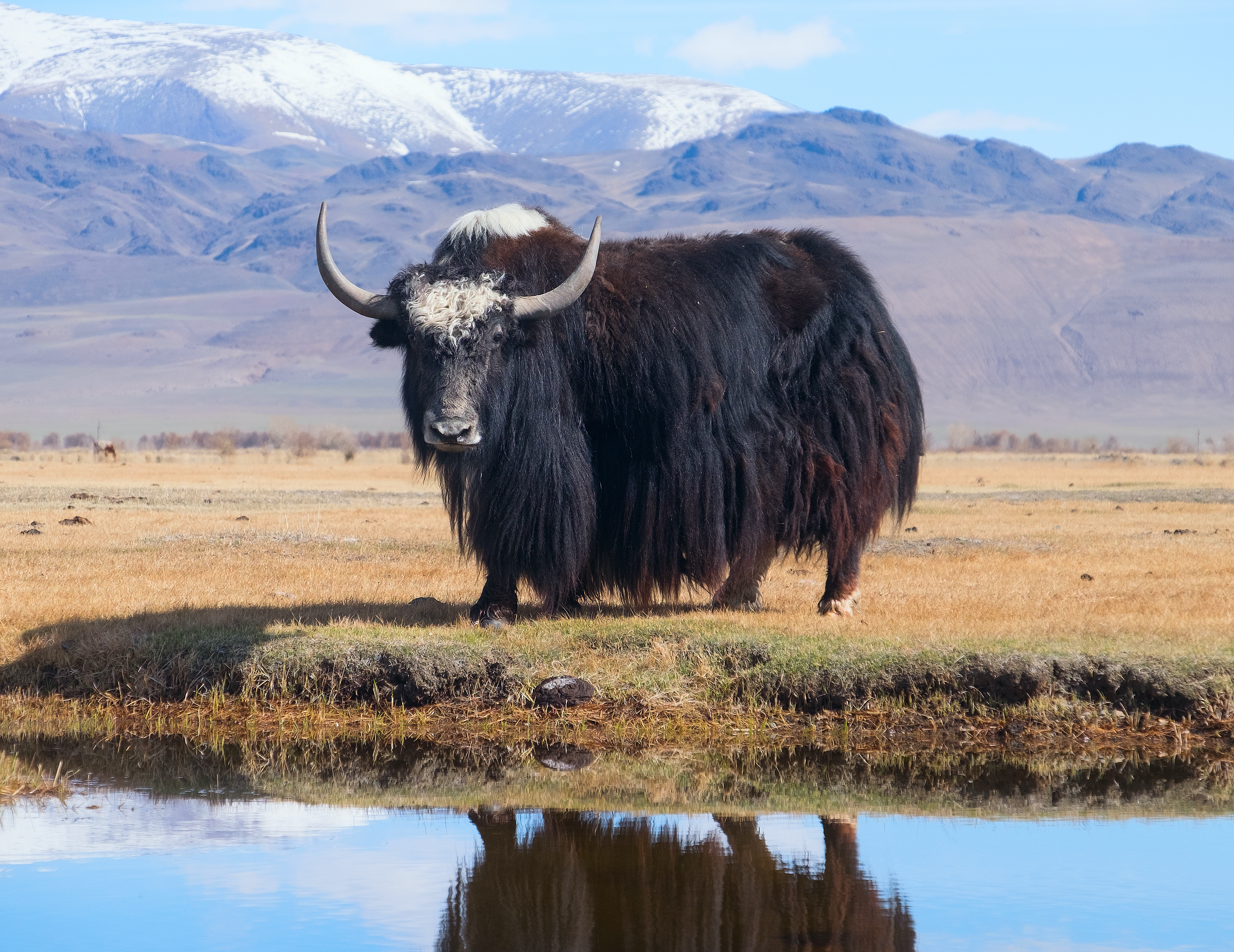
- A yak near Chagan-Uzun, Altai Republic, Russia

Conservation status
- Domesticated

Scientific classification
- Kingdom: Animalia
- Phylum: Chordata
- Class: Mammalia
- Order: Artiodactyla
- Family: Bovidae
- Subfamily: Bovinae
- Genus: Bos
- Species: B. grunniens

Binomial name
- Bos grunniens Linnaeus, 1766

Synonyms
- Poephagus grunniens

= Yak =

Long-haired domesticated bovid

The yak (Bos grunniens) (Note: Also known as the Tartary ox, grunting ox, hairy cattle, sarlak or sarlyk, or domestic yak.) is a species of long-haired domesticated Asian cattle found throughout the Himalayan region, the Tibetan Plateau, Tajikistan, the Pamir Mountains, and as far north as Mongolia and Siberia. It is descended from the wild yak (Bos mutus).

== Etymology ==
The English word Yak originates from the Tibetan: གཡག་, Wylie: g.yag. In Tibetan and Balti it refers only to the male of the species, the female being called Tibetan: འབྲི་, Wylie: 'bri or Tibetan: གནག, Wylie: gnag in Tibetan and Tibetan: ཧཡག་མོ་, Wylie: hYag-mo in Balti. In English, as in most other languages that have borrowed the word, yak is usually used for both sexes, with bull or cow referring to each sex separately.

== Taxonomy ==
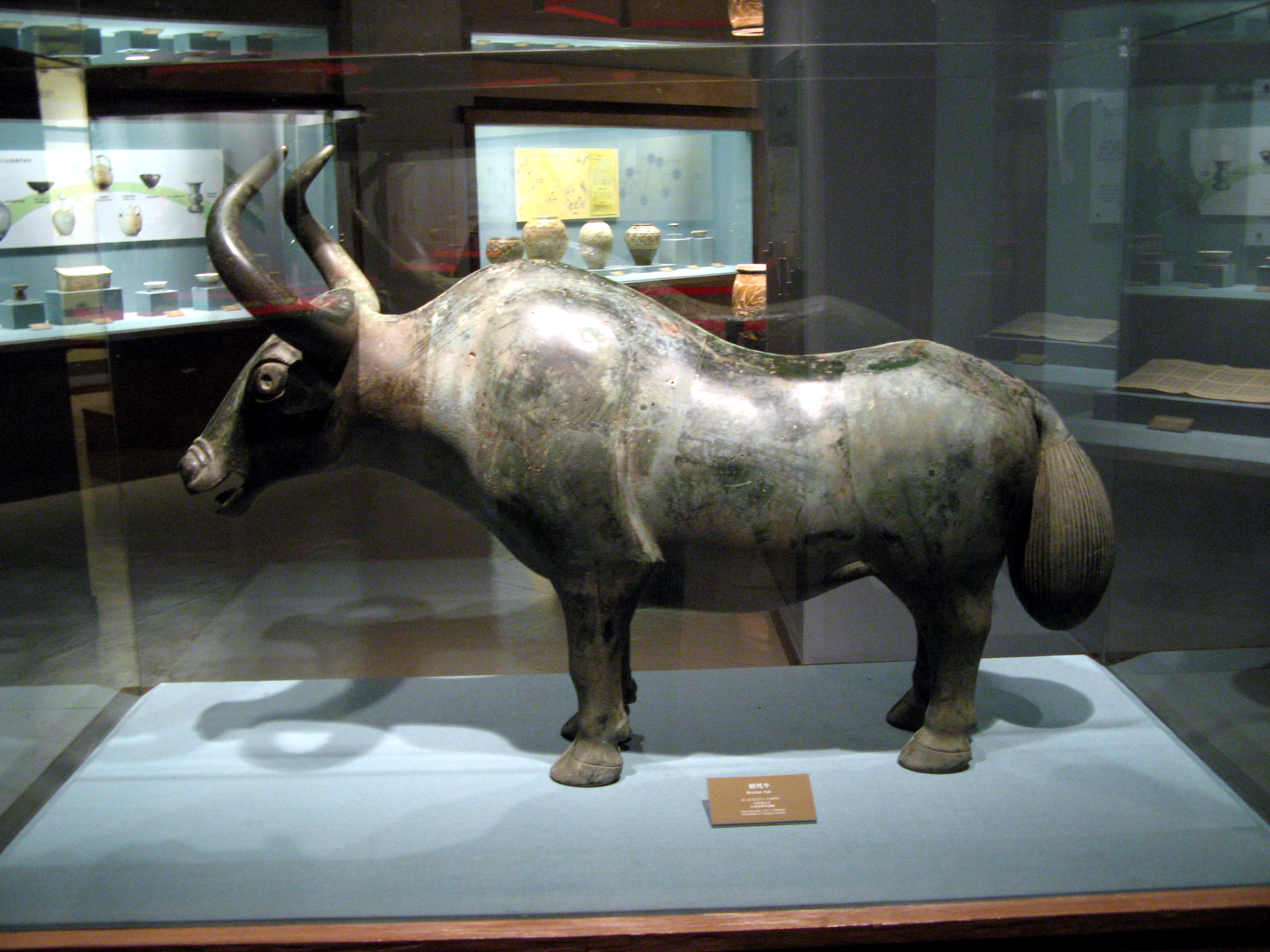
Bronze model of yak from Gansu, China; Yuan dynasty, 1271–1368 AD

Belonging to the genus Bos, yaks are related to cattle and bison. Mitochondrial DNA analyses to determine the evolutionary history of yaks have been inconclusive.

The yak may have diverged from cattle at any point between one and five million years ago, and there is some suggestion that it may be more closely related to bison than to the other members of its designated genus. Apparent close fossil relatives of the yak, such as Bos baikalensis, have been found in eastern Russia, suggesting a possible route by which yak-like ancestors of the modern American bison could have entered the Americas.

The species was originally designated as Bos grunniens ("grunting ox") by Linnaeus in 1766. Still, this name is now generally considered to refer only to the domesticated form of the animal, with Bos mutus ("mute ox") being the preferred name for the wild species. Although some authors still consider the wild yak to be a subspecies, Bos grunniens mutus, the ICZN made an official ruling in 2003 permitting the use of the name Bos mutus for wild yaks, and this is now the more common usage.

There are no recognised subspecies of yak except where the wild yak is considered a subspecies of Bos grunniens.

== Physical characteristics ==
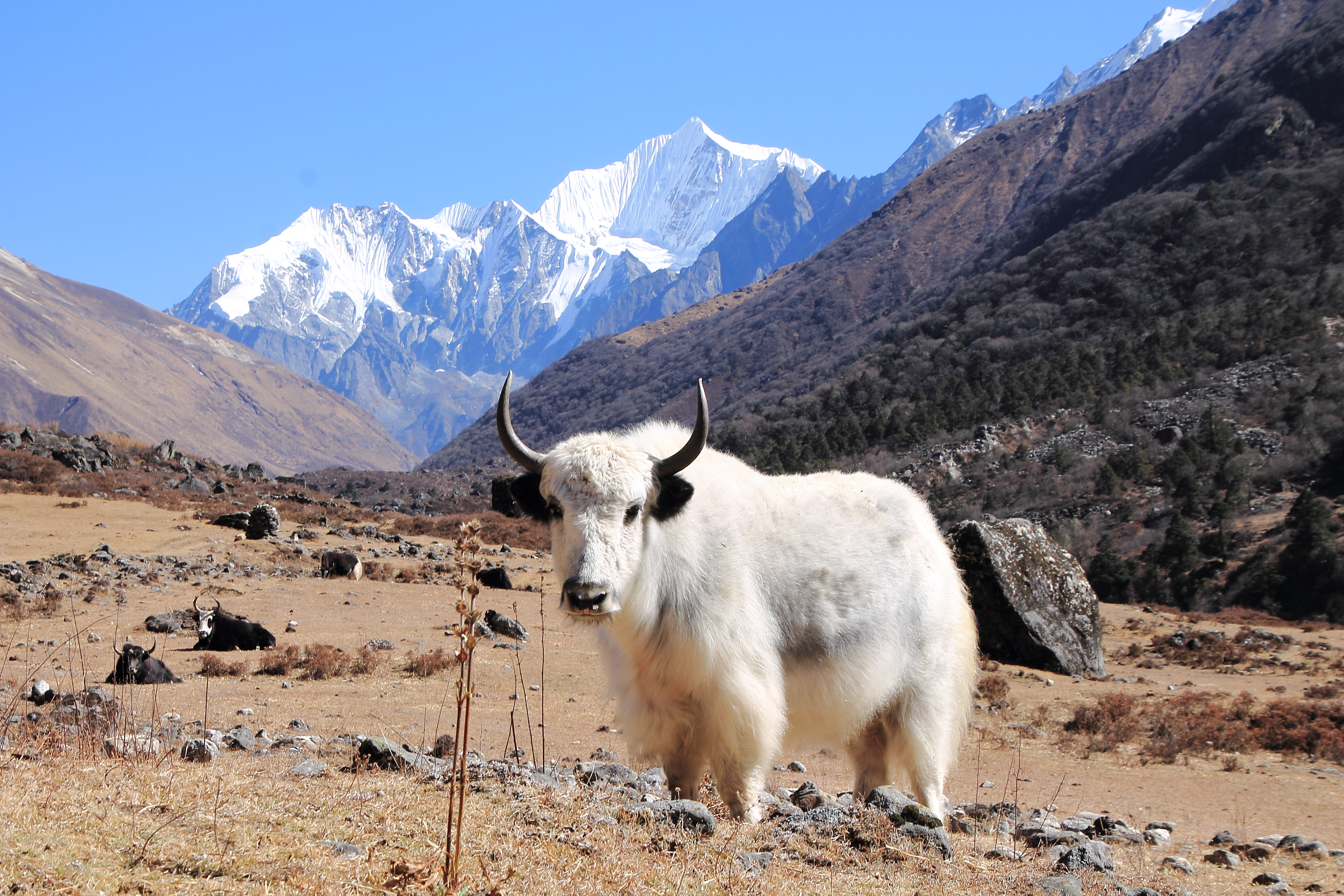
A yak at Langtang valley, Nepal

Yaks are heavily built animals with bulky frames, sturdy legs, rounded, cloven hooves, and extremely dense, long fur hanging lower than the belly. While wild yaks are generally dark, blackish to brown in colouration, domestic yaks can be quite variable, often having rusty brown and cream patches. They have small ears and broad foreheads, with smooth horns that are generally dark in colour. In males (bulls), the horns sweep out from the sides of the head and then curve backwards; they typically range from 48 to 99 cm (19 to 39 in) in length.

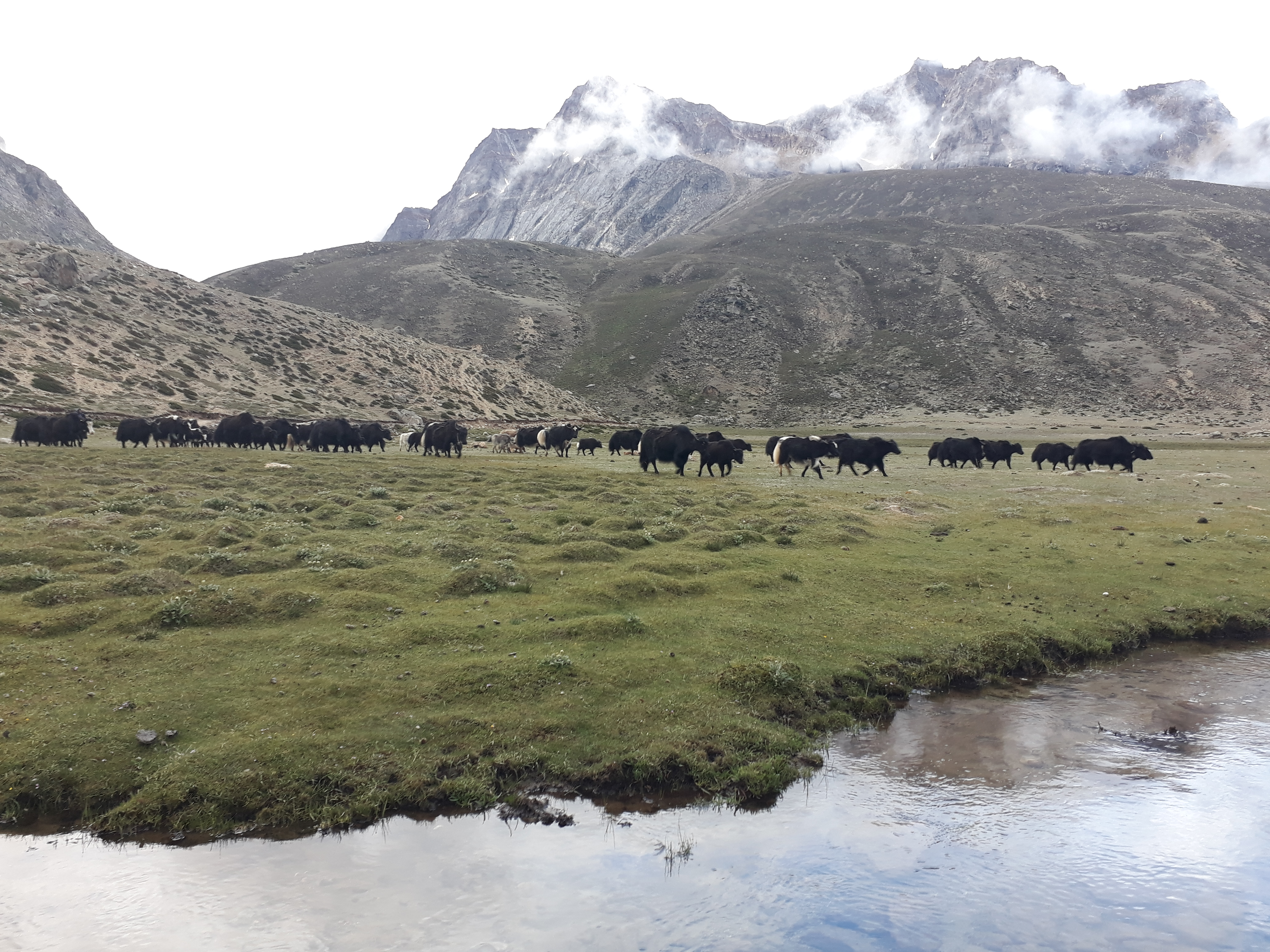
Yak herds in Muguthang valley, North Sikkim, India.

The horns of females (cows) are smaller, at 27 to 64 cm (11 to 25 in) in length, and have a more upright shape. Both sexes have a short neck with a pronounced hump over the shoulders, although this is larger and more visible in males. Males weigh 350 to 585 kg (772 to 1,290 lb), females weigh 225 to 255 kg (496 to 562 lb). Wild (feral) yaks can be substantially heavier, bulls reaching weights of up to 1,000 kg (2,200 lb). Depending on the breed, domestic yak males are 111–138 cm (44–54 in) high at the withers, while females are 105–117 cm (41–46 in) high at the withers.

Both sexes have long, shaggy hair with a dense woolly undercoat over the chest, flanks, and thighs to insulate them from the cold. Especially in bulls, this may form a long "skirt" that can reach the ground. The tail is long and horselike rather than tufted like the tails of cattle or bison. Domesticated yaks have a wide range of coat colours, with some individuals being white, grey, brown, roan or piebald. The udder in females and the scrotum in males are small and hairy as protection against the cold. Females have four teats.

Yaks are not known to produce the characteristic lowing (mooing) sound of cattle, but both wild and domestic yaks grunt and squeak, which inspired the scientific name of the domestic yak variant, Bos grunniens (grunting bull). Nikolay Przhevalsky named the wild variant Bos mutus (silent bull), believing that it did not make a sound at all, but it does.

=== Physiology ===
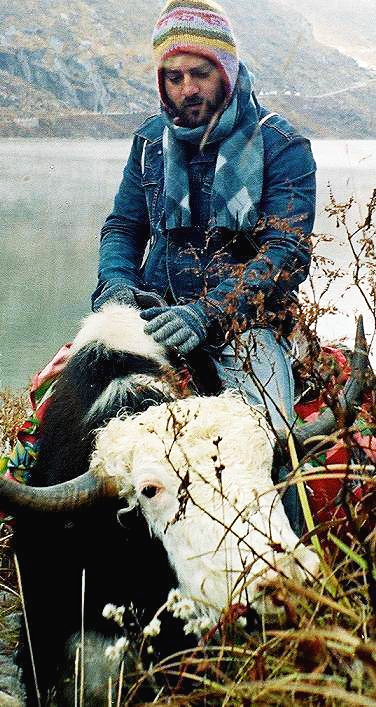
Yak rider near Tsomgo Lake, Sikkim (3,700 m or 12,100 ft)

Yak physiology is well adapted to high altitudes, having larger lungs and heart than cattle found at lower altitudes, as well as greater capacity for transporting oxygen through their blood, due to the persistence of foetal haemoglobin throughout life. Conversely, yaks have trouble thriving at lower altitudes, and are prone to suffering from heat exhaustion above about 15 °C (59 °F). Further adaptations to the cold include a thick layer of subcutaneous fat and an almost complete lack of functional sweat glands.

Compared with domestic cattle, the rumen of yaks is unusually large, relative to the omasum. This likely allows them to consume greater quantities of low-quality food at a time, and to ferment it longer to extract more nutrients. Yak consume the equivalent of 1% of their body weight daily while cattle require 3% to maintain condition. They are grazing herbivores, with their wild ancestors feeding primarily on grass and sedges, with some herbs and dwarf shrubs.

== Reproduction and life history ==
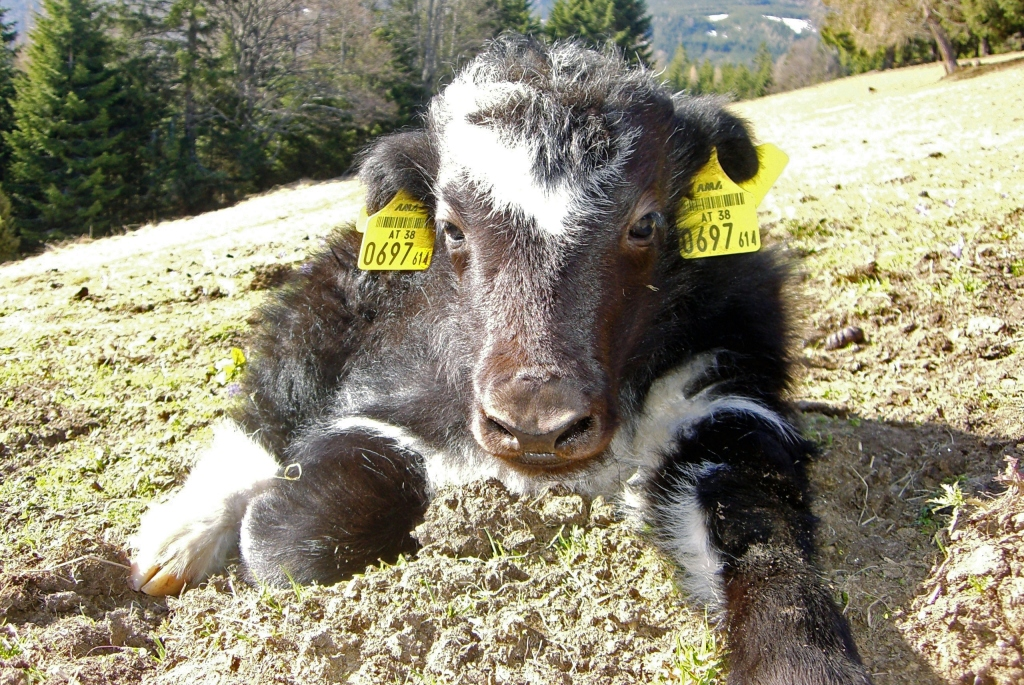
Ten-day-old yak

Yaks mate in the summer, typically between July and September, depending on the local environment. For the remainder of the year, many bulls wander in small bachelor groups away from the large herds. Still, as the rut approaches, they become aggressive and regularly fight with each other to establish dominance. In addition to non-violent threat displays, bellowing, and scraping the ground with their horns, bull yaks compete more directly, repeatedly charging at each other with heads lowered or sparring with their horns. Like bison, but unlike cattle, males wallow in dry soil during the rut, often while scent-marking with urine or dung. Females enter oestrus up to four times a year, and females are receptive only for a few hours in each cycle.

Gestation lasts between 257 and 270 days, so that the young are born between May and June, and results in the birth of a single calf. The cow finds a secluded spot to give birth, but the calf can walk within about ten minutes of birth, and the pair soon rejoin the herd. Females of both the wild and domestic forms typically give birth only once every other year, although more frequent births are possible if the food supply is good.

Calves are weaned at one year and become independent shortly thereafter. Wild calves are initially brown in color and only later develop darker adult hair. Females generally give birth for the first time at three or four years of age, and reach their peak reproductive fitness at around six years. Yaks may live for more than twenty years in domestication or captivity, although it is likely that this may be somewhat shorter in the wild.

== Husbandry ==
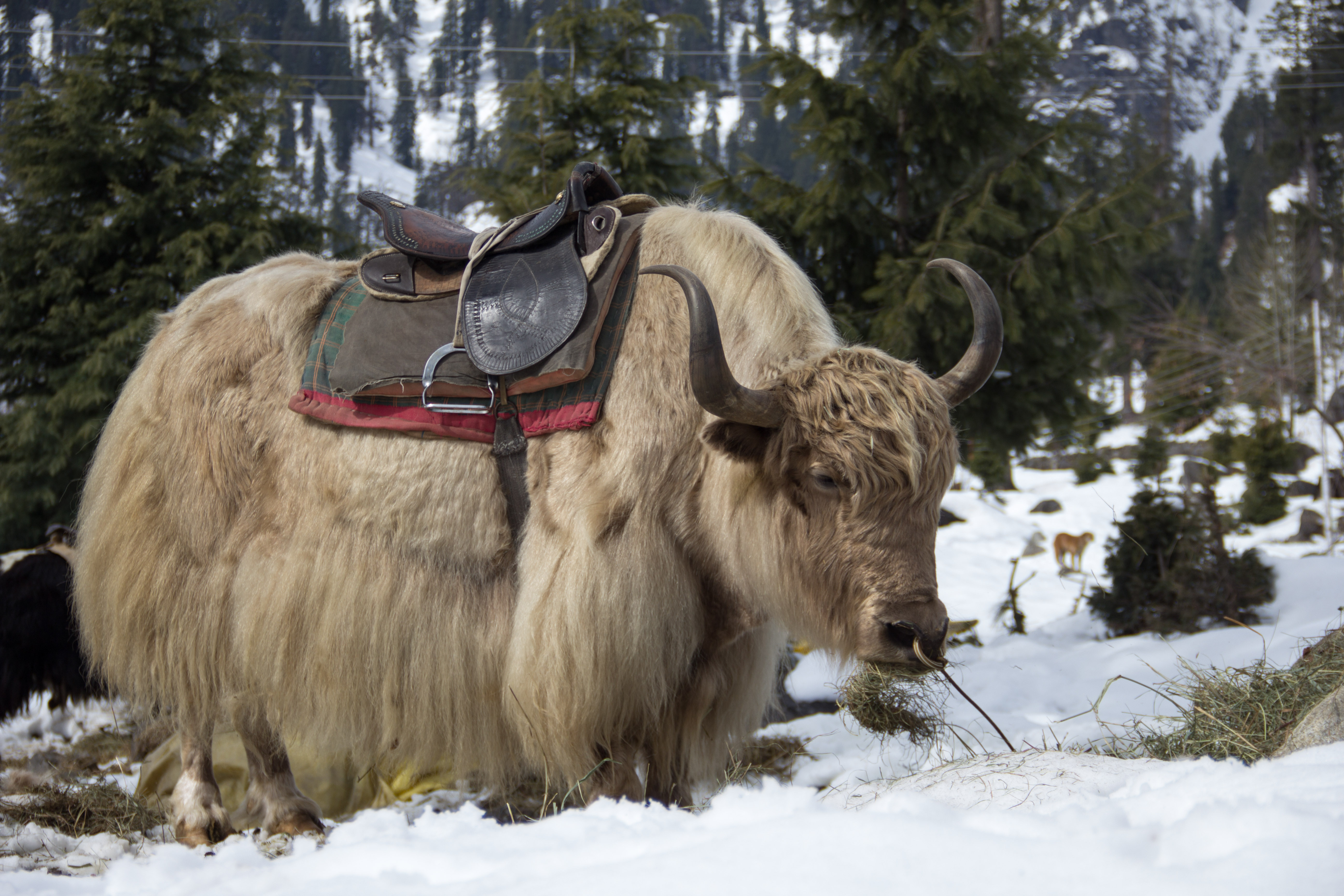
A domesticated Yak being used for tourists in Manali, Himachal Pradesh, India.

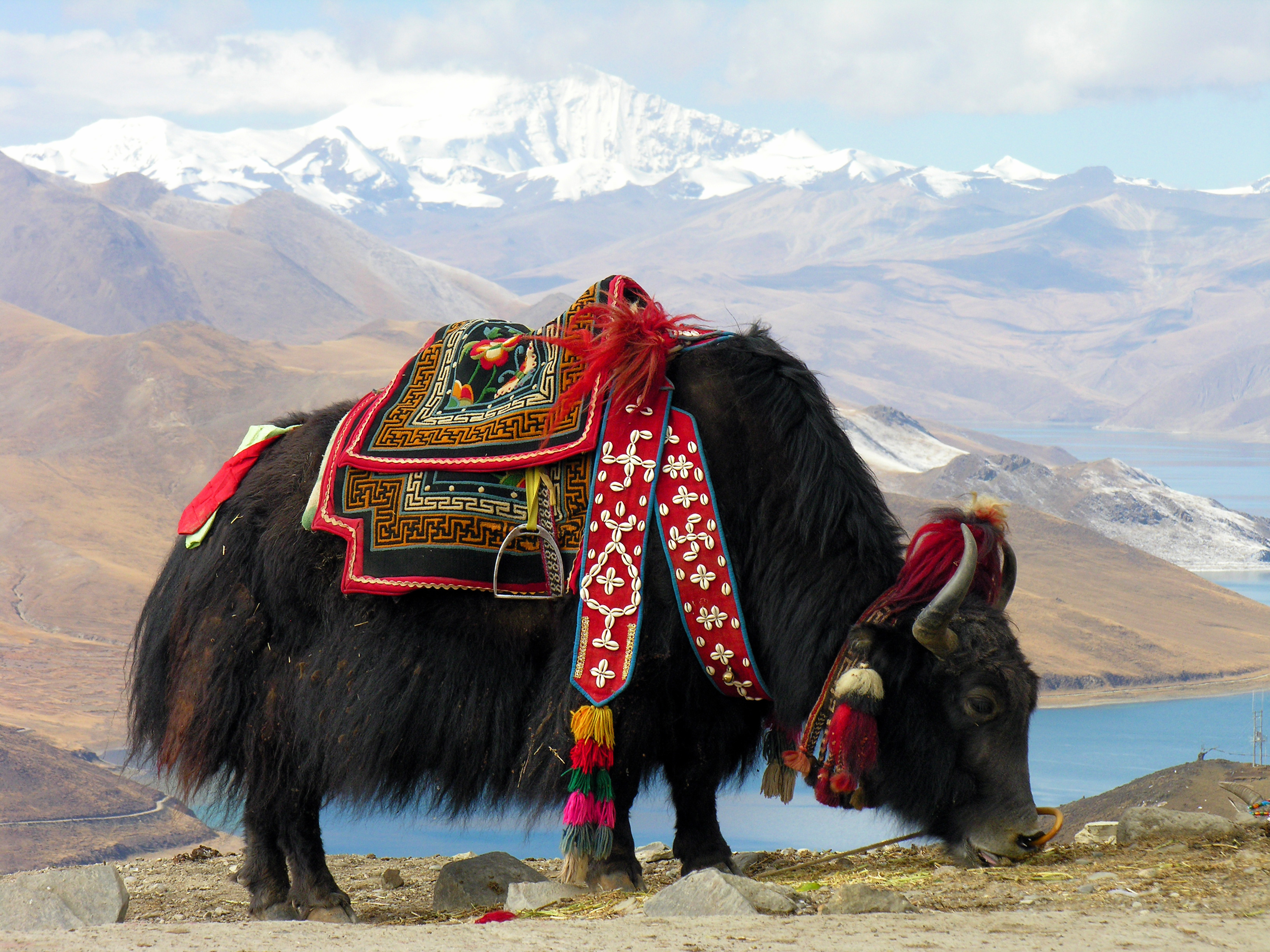
Near Yamdrok Lake in Tibet.

For thousands of years, domesticated yaks have been kept in Mongolia and Tibet, primarily for their milk, fibre (wool), and meat, and as beasts of burden. Their dried droppings are an important fuel, used all over Tibet, and are often the only fuel available on the high, treeless Tibetan Plateau. Yaks transport goods across mountain passes for local farmers and traders and are an attraction for climbing and trekking expeditions:

Only one thing makes it hard to use yaks for long journeys in barren regions. They will not eat grain, which could be carried on the journey. They will starve unless they can be brought to a place where there is grass.

They also are used to draw ploughs. Yaks' milk is often processed to a cheese called chhurpi in Tibetan and Nepali languages, and byaslag in Mongolia. Butter made from yaks' milk is an ingredient of the butter tea that Tibetans consume in large quantities, and is also used in lamps and made into butter sculptures used in religious festivities.

=== Outside the Himalayas ===
Small numbers of herds can be found in the United States, Canada, New Zealand, and some parts of Europe. Yaks have generated interest outside the Himalayas as a commercial crop and by cattle breeders. The main interest of North American yak breeders is lean meat production by hybridizing with other cattle, followed by wool production.

=== Research ===
The Indian government established a dedicated centre for research into yak husbandry, the ICAR-National Research Centre on Yak, in 1989. It is located at Dirang, Arunachal Pradesh, and maintains a yak farm in the Nyukmadung area at an altitude of 2,750 metres (9,020 ft) above MSL.

=== Breeding and hybridization ===
In Nepal, Tibet, and Mongolia, domestic cattle are crossbred with yaks. This gives rise to the infertile male dzo མཛོ། as well as fertile females known as dzomo or zhom མཛོ་མོ།, which may be crossed again with cattle. The Dwarf Lulu breed, "the only Bos primigenius taurus type of cattle in Nepal" has been tested for DNA markers and found to be a mixture of both taurine and zebu types of cattle (B. p. taurus and B. p. indicus) with yak. According to the International Veterinary Information Service, the low productivity of second-generation cattle–yak crosses makes them suitable only as meat animals.

Crosses between yaks and domestic cattle (Bos primigenius taurus) have been recorded in Chinese literature for at least 2,000 years. Successful crosses have also been recorded between yak and American bison, gaur, and banteng, generally with similar results to those produced with domestic cattle.

=== Domestication ===
Jacques et al. (2021) show that most elaborate yak-related terminologies are found within Tibetic and Gyalrongic languages. Both branches also have native terms for yak-cattle hybrids, suggesting that Tibetic and Gyalrongic speakers may have independently cross-bred yaks and cattle, predating the proto-Gyalrongic split (3221 [2169–4319] BP) from Tibeto-Gyalrongic. The oldest dated physical evidence of yak domestication is from 2,500 years BP.

== Customs ==
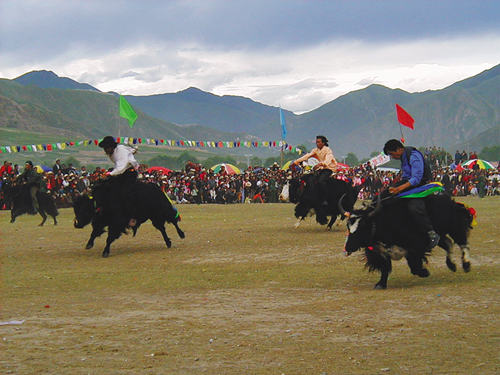
Yak racing

In parts of Tibet and Karakorum, yak racing is a form of entertainment at traditional festivals and an important part of their culture. More recently, sports involving domesticated yaks, such as yak skiing or yak polo, are being marketed as tourist attractions in South Asian countries, including in Gilgit-Baltistan, Pakistan.

In Nepal, an annual festival is held to drink the fresh blood of yak, and it is believed that it cures various diseases such as gastritis, jaundice, and body strain. The fresh blood is extracted from the neck of a yak without killing it. The cut is healed after the ceremony is over. The ritual is believed to be originated in Tibet and Mustang.

Traditionally, yaks are used to transport deceased people to charnel grounds for sky burials in Tibet, with Tibetan practice holding that the yaks be set free upon the conclusion of the task.

Yak skiing is a sport practiced in the Indian hill resort of Manali, Himachal Pradesh, as a tourist attraction. The sport involves a skier waiting at the bottom of a slope and a yak at the top of the hill; yak and skier are connected by means of a rope going around a pulley at the top of the hill. To engage the yak, the skier must shake (and swiftly put down) a bucket of pony nuts. This attracts the yak, which charges downhill and pulls the skier upward by means of the rope.

== Gallery ==
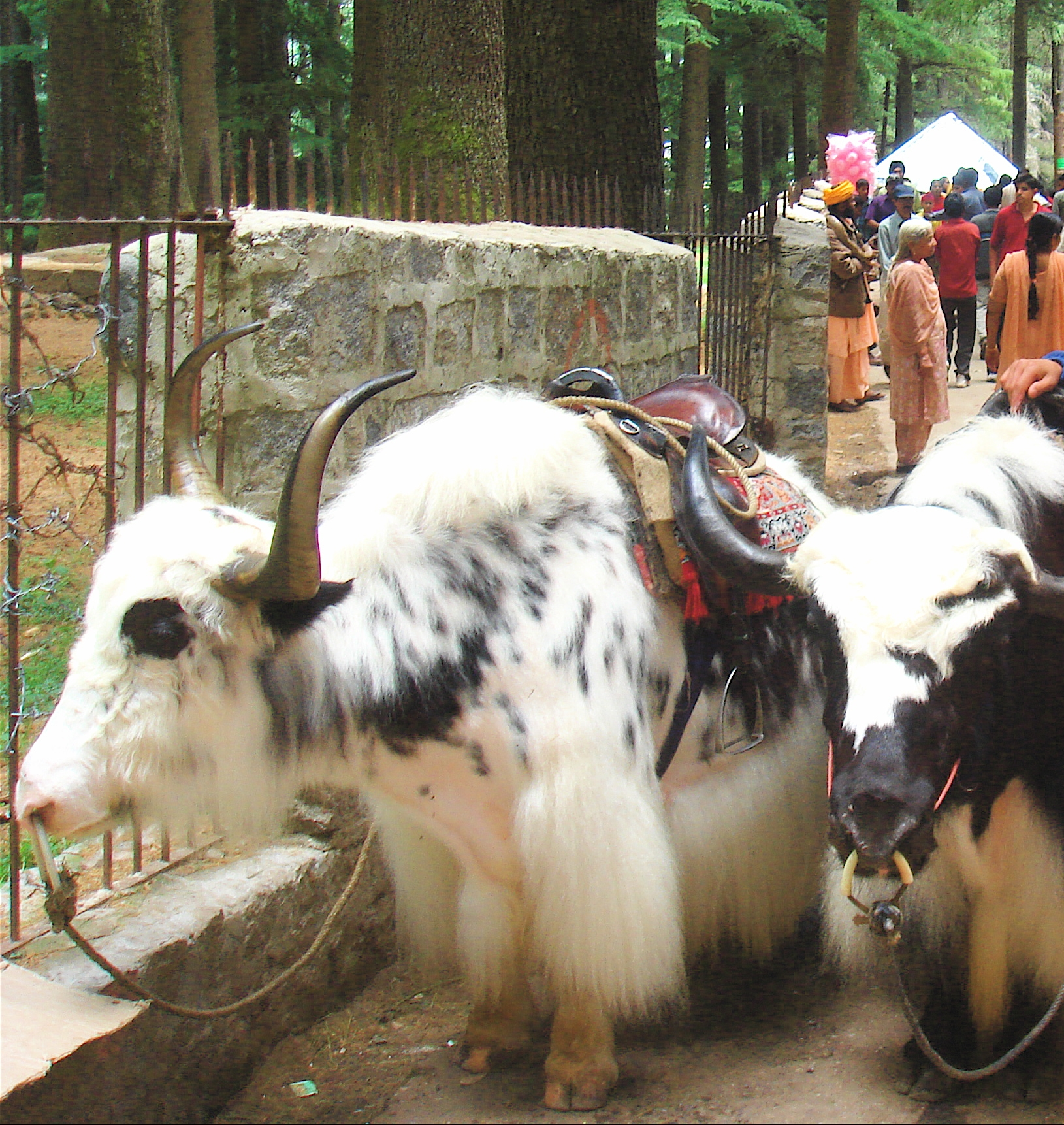
Yaks in Manali, Himachal Pradesh, India, saddled for riding

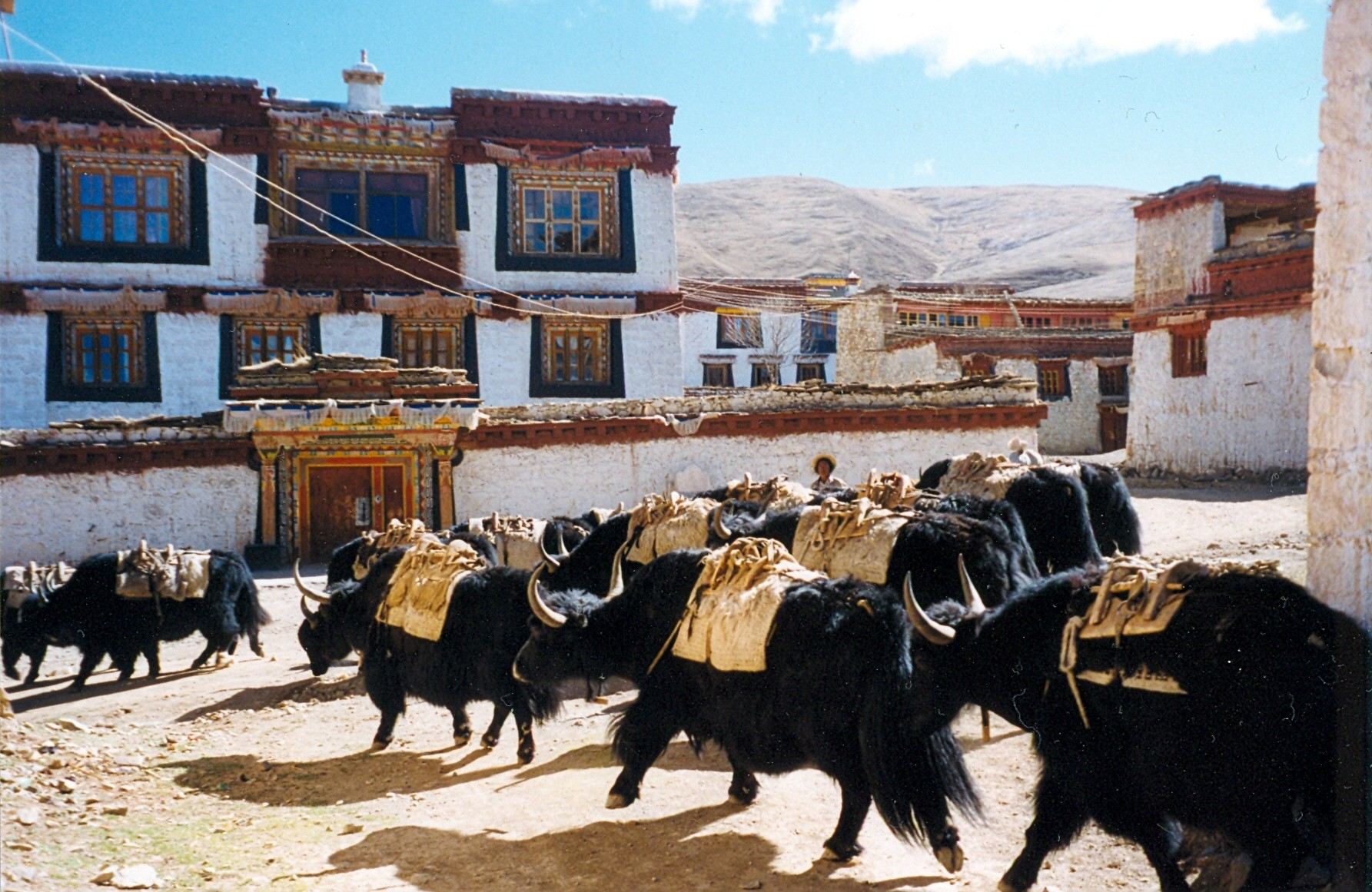
Train of pack yaks at Litang monastery in Garzê Tibetan Autonomous Prefecture, Sichuan, China

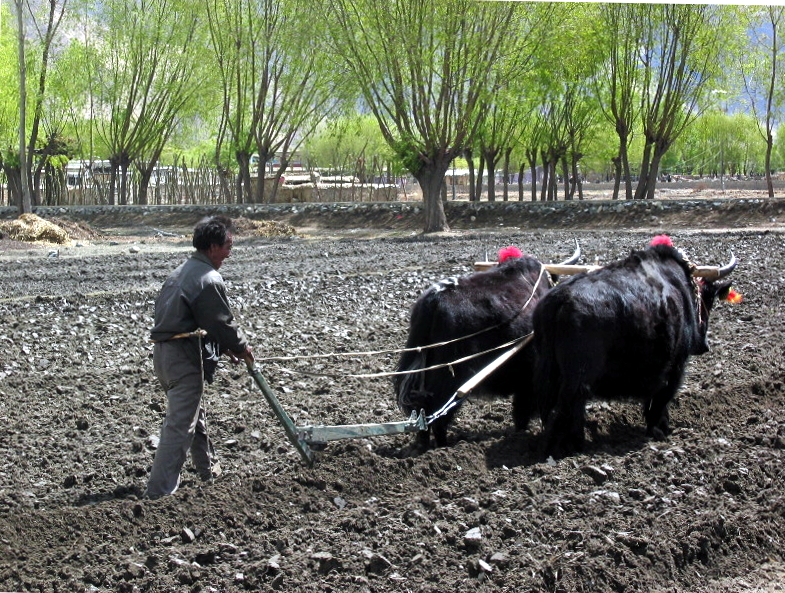
Yaks plowing fields in Tibet

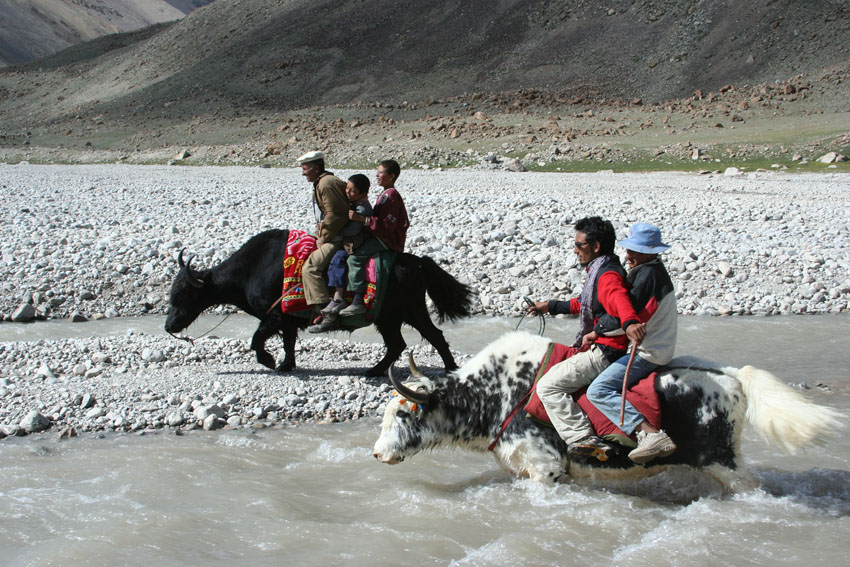
Yaks in Gilgit-Baltistan, Pakistan

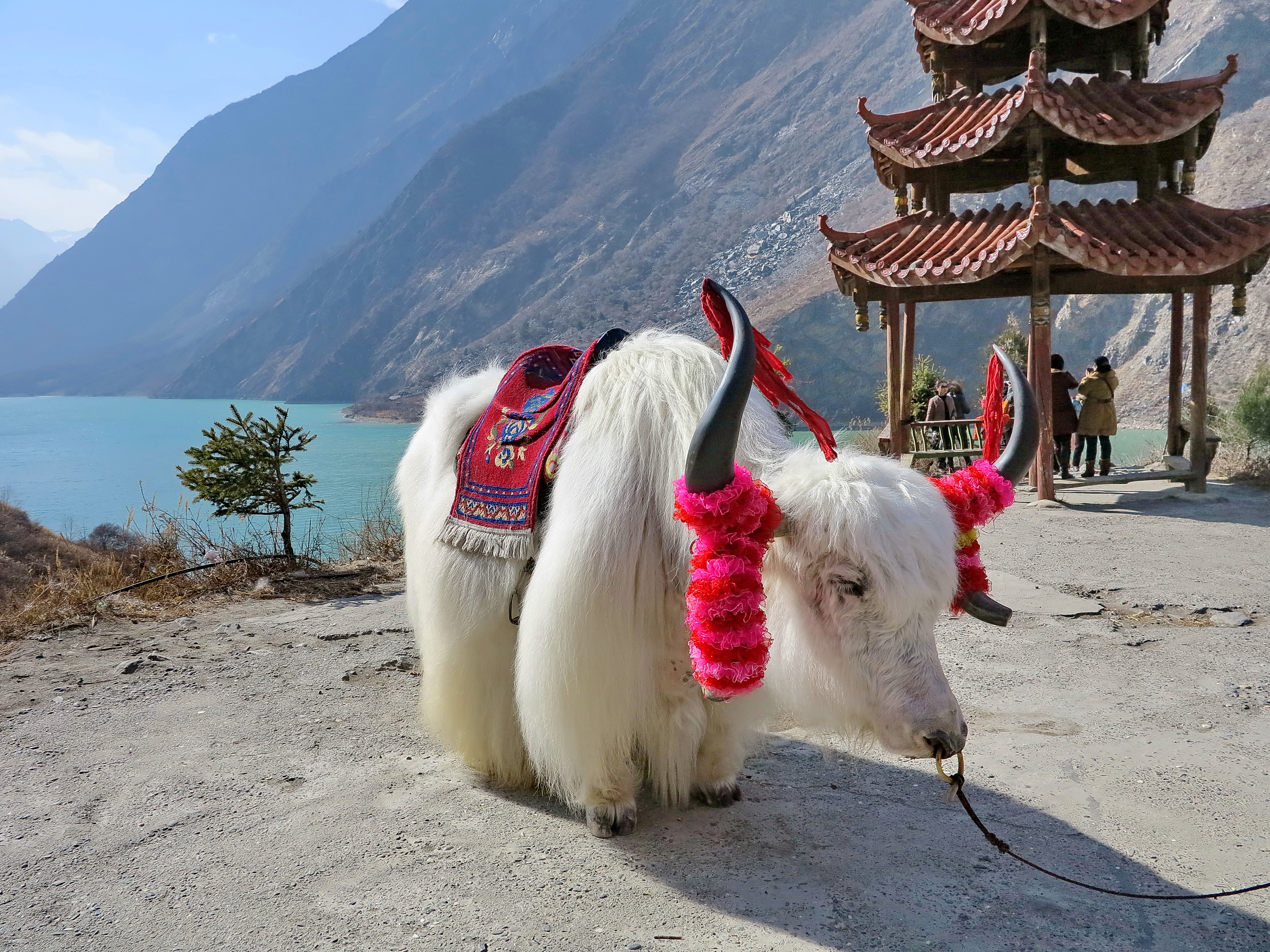
Domestic yak in Mao County, China

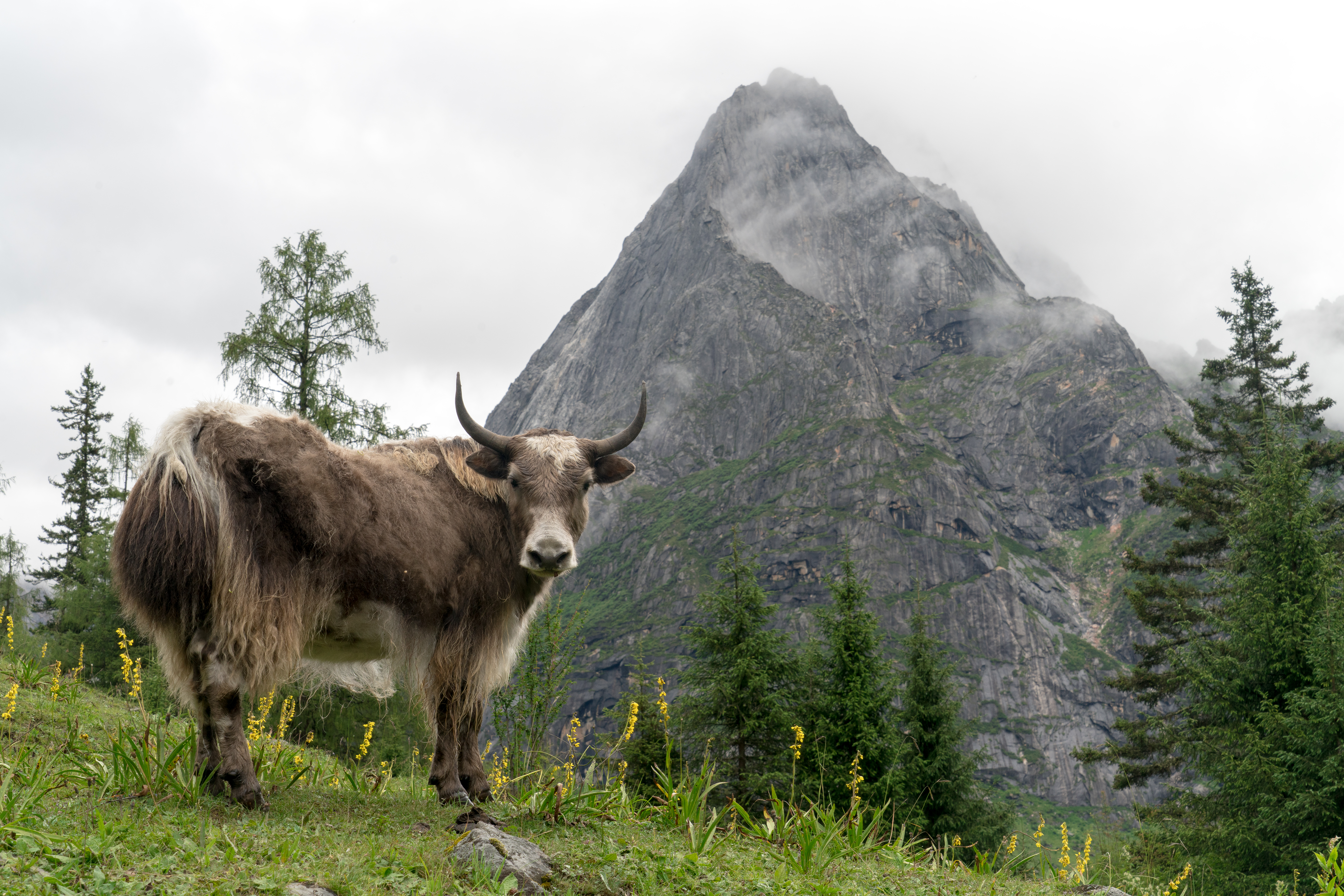
A yak at Mount Siguniang Scenic Area, Sichuan, China

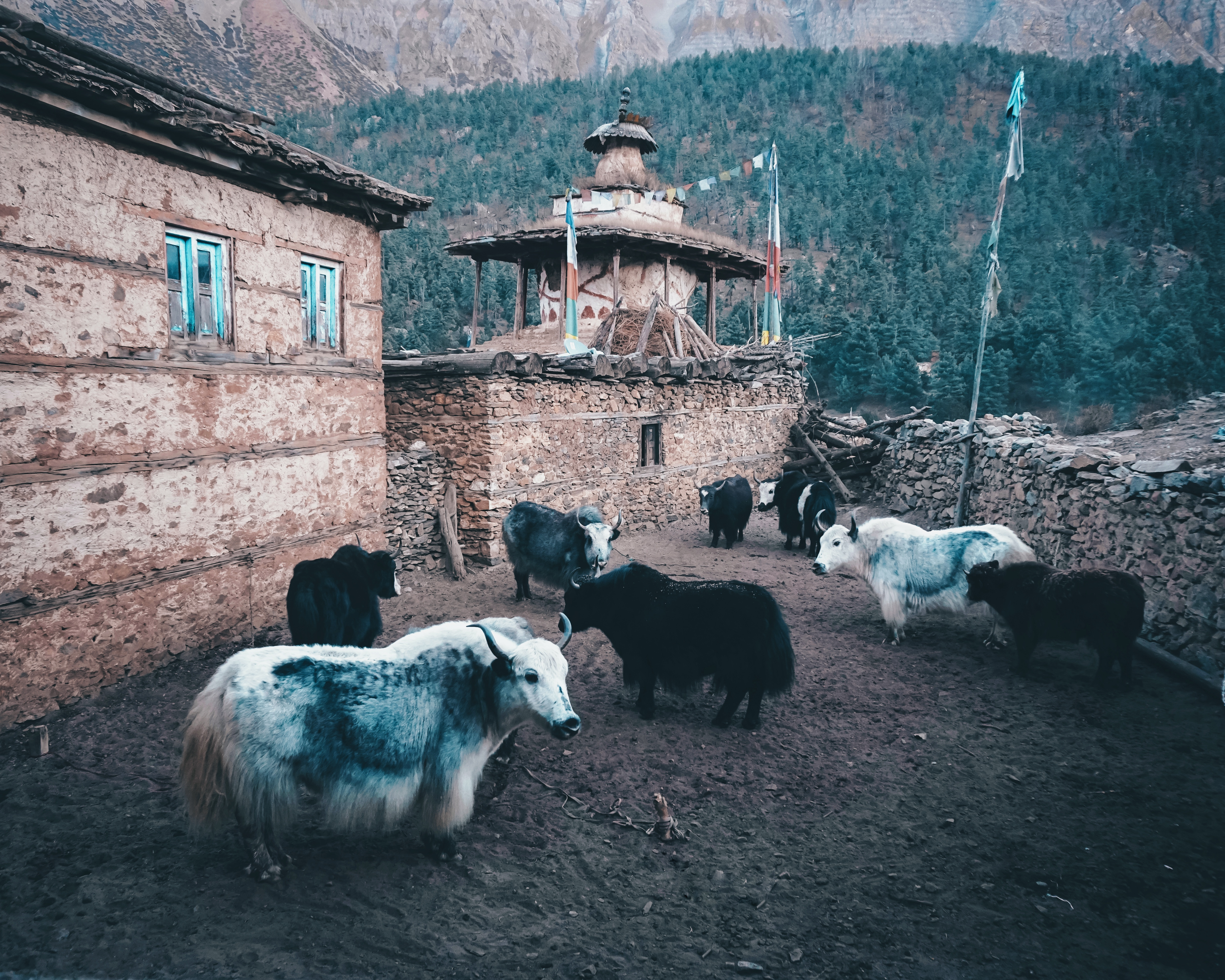
Yak are reared on grazing pastures and meadows at elevations of 3,000–5,000 m (9,800–16,400 ft) above sea level in 28 northern mountain districts in Nepal.

== See also ==
- Yak dance
- Yakalo
