= George W. Hayward =

British explorer

- Born: c. 1839; Leeds, West Yorkshire, England
- Died: 18 July 1870 (aged 30–31); Darkot Pass, Gilgit Agency, Jammu and Kashmir, British India
- Cause of death: Murder
- Burial place: Old British Cemetery, Gilgit–Baltistan, Pakistan; 35.922°N 74.305°E
- Occupations: Explorer, soldier
- Era: The Great Game
- Parent(s): George Hayward Sr. (father); Eleanora Whitaker (mother)

George Jonas Whitaker Hayward (c. 1839 – 18 July 1870) was a well-known nineteenth-century English explorer. Information for all but the final few years of his life is scarce. His exploration efforts and eventual murder in South Asia during "The Great Game" period eventually earned him a degree of acknowledgement and fame.

== Pre-exploration life ==
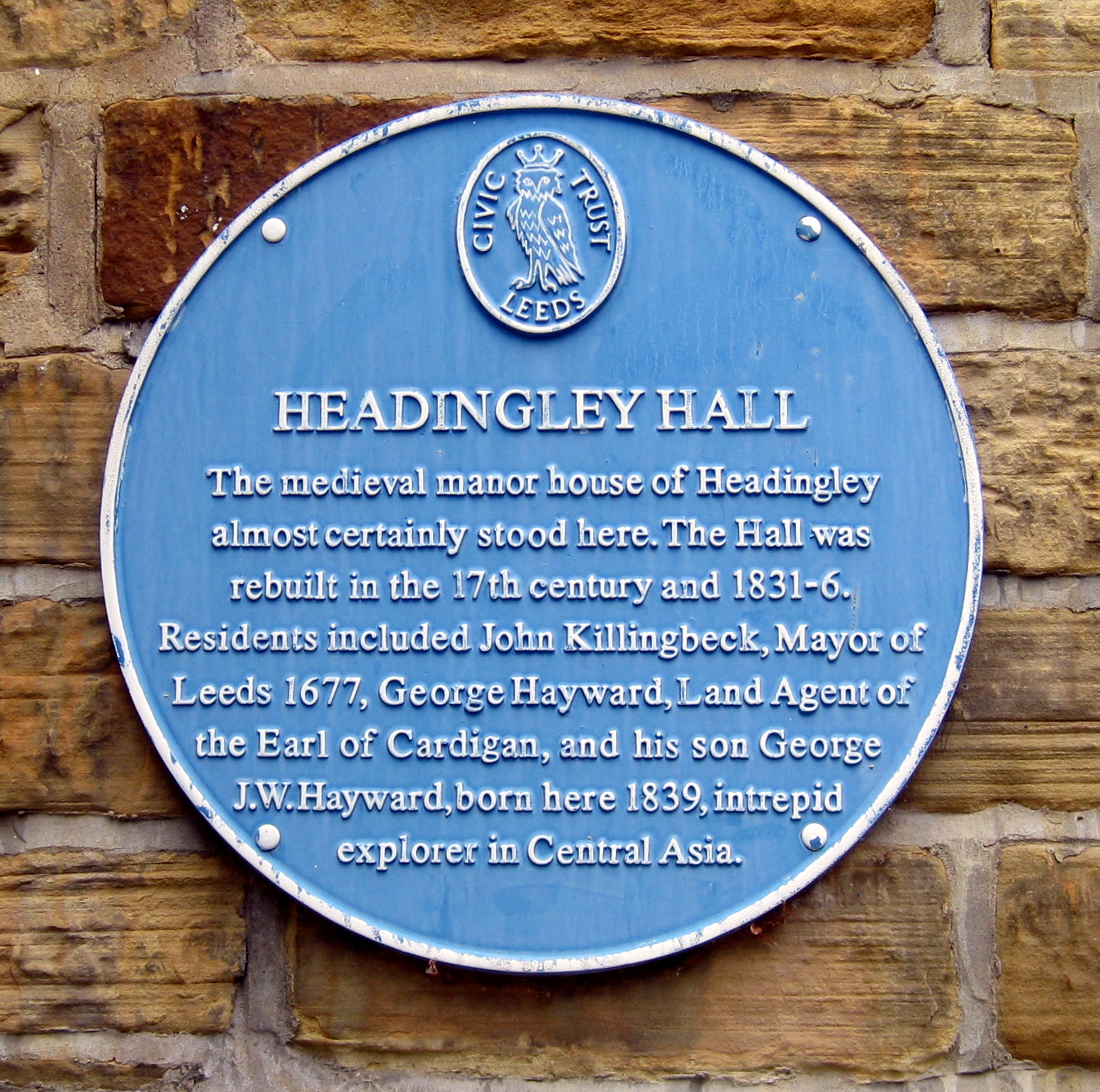
Plaque on his birthplace, Headingley Hall.

Hayward was long believed to have been Irish but research in the 1990s by Charles Timmis revealed that he was in fact a Yorkshireman, born at Headingley Hall on the outskirts of Leeds. His father, also named George Hayward, was a Land Agent working for the Earl of Cardigan around Leeds. His mother was Eleanora Whitaker, who died when he was only about 6 years old. He was educated at the Forest School in north London. In 1859 he became an ensign in the British Army. He was stationed in Multan, India (now in Pakistan) with the 89th Regiment of Foot. In 1863 he purchased a commission and became a lieutenant. He next transferred to the Cameron Highlanders regiment in 1864. He sold his commission in 1865 and left the British Army.

== Affiliation with the Royal Geographical Society ==
Hayward appeared in England in 1868 and approached Sir Henry Rawlinson, vice president of the Royal Geographical Society. He wanted to be hired as an explorer in central Asia and the western Himalayas. Surprisingly Hayward was provided with £300, surveying equipment, map making instruments and instructions to attempt to reach and survey the then unmapped Pamir Mountains where the territory and influence of the Raj and the Russian Empire were inching ever closer. Hayward was to become the only explorer funded by the Royal Geographical Society during "The Great Game."

== Political turmoil in Central Asia ==
The era that Hayward operated in was one of imperial expansion in Central Asia. In the south the British Empire, based in India, was consolidating and expanding its positions to the north. In the north the Russian Empire was expanding its territory at a dramatic pace. Soon the Russians were expanding south into central Asia. The area between the two empires was shrinking fast and clandestine agents and explorers were sent to map this unknown area of the world full of lawless tribes, murderous despot rulers and some of the most formidable and challenging terrain on Earth.

Although the Royal Geographical Society was strictly apolitical, Rawlinson was also a member of the government's India Council and a known Russophobe. For this reason it has often been suggested that he may have had political motivations in encouraging Hayward's explorations.

== Journey to Kashgar and Yarkand ==
Hayward's official Royal Geographical Society mission was to explore the Pamirs and their routes and approaches. After being rebuffed by officials from approaching the Pamirs via the Northwest Frontier he travelled to Ladakh and onwards to Kashgaria with the intention of approaching the Pamirs from there.

Another Englishman, Robert Shaw, uncle of Sir Francis Younghusband, was making a similar journey to Yarkand and Kashgar at the same time. Shaw seems to have resented Hayward's presence, and although they were often within a few hundred metres of one another, they only met once at the start of their approach to Kashgaria, and then again many months later.

While awaiting permission to proceed at the Kashgaria border Hayward escaped from his guards and spent 20 days exploring and charting the course of the Yarkand River.

Shaw reached Kashgaria in December 1868 after sending ahead envoys announcing his arrival and carrying with him gifts for Yakub Beg. Yakub Beg had just made himself ruler of Kashgaria after the Chinese had been driven out by the Dungan Revolt (1862–77). A few weeks after Shaw's arrival he was joined by Hayward. Hayward sent no envoy and hand no gifts but convinced the border guards he was with Shaw. Shaw was disturbed by this as he figured Hayward would be stopped at the border.

In Yarkand, Hayward and Shaw were kept separately under house arrest. Later, Shaw was allowed to proceed to Kashgar to meet with Yakub Beg. After a warm reception, Shaw found himself once again under house arrest. A few weeks later, Hayward arrived in Kashgar: he too was placed under house arrest. The two were able to communicate by passing secret notes.

Neither man knew at the time, but they were being held while Yakub Beg was waiting for the response to his recent envoy to Russia. When no positive response came from Russia, Shaw again was allowed an audience with the King. Afterwards, he was free to return home and was able to arrange for Hayward's release as well as that of Mirza Shuja, a Pundit exploring the region for Britain.

For his efforts exploring the Kun Lun and Karakoram mountains, and the route of the Upper Yarkand River during his approach to Kashgaria, Hayward was awarded the Royal Geographical Society's Founder's Medal.

== Himalayas, Hindu Kush and source of the Oxus ==
In November 1869, Hayward started his next journey north through the Himalaya. With almost no provisions or gear he travelled in the dead of winter almost 300 miles to Gilgit. The winter crossing took over two months instead of the ten to twenty days it took when the passes were clear.

While travelling in this region, he had to cross a war zone between Hindu Kashmiris and Muslim Dardistan. In search of a new approach to the Pamirs he visited the Yasin Valley and became friends with Mir Wali who convinced him it was impossible to proceed through the Hindu Kush until the summer thaw.

Hayward returned to India, again crossing the Himalaya with no supplies in the dead of winter. Upon returning he wrote a letter to a Calcutta newspaper describing the atrocities that the Kashmiris had committed against people in Yasin. The publication of the letter caused a minor political storm, as the Maharaja of Kashmir, Ranbir Singh, was a close British ally and vassal. Because of the negative attention he received from this letter Hayward severed his connection with the Royal Geographical Society.

In June 1870, Hayward again headed north now that the mountain passes were clear. He travelled through Kashmiri territory and reached Gilgit with no difficulty. In mid-July he reached Yasin once more and proceeded to the Darkot Pass at the head of the valley. He was on the verge of reaching the Oxus river and the Pamirs.

On the morning of 18 July 1870, Hayward stayed up all night after receiving word he might be attacked. Towards dawn he fell asleep and was attacked. His hands were tied behind his back. He was dragged into the woods where he was murdered.

== Death ==
Controversy and mystery surround Hayward's death.

One version of events states that his friend Mir Wali arranged his death on the orders of Aman ul-Mulk. The alternative, which was less convenient for the British, had it that the Maharaja of Kashmir had arranged Hayward's death as revenge for the letter about the Kashmiri atrocities in Dardistan. The theory says the Maharaja exacted revenge against Hayward and also benefited by framing the ruler's enemy, Mir Wali.

Hayward's body was later recovered by a Kashmiri soldier. It was found under a small pile of rocks, taken back to Gilgit, and buried in an orchard that later became the town's Christian cemetery. His tombstone, paid for by the Maharaja of Kashmir, reads: "To the memory of G. W. Hayward, Gold Medallist of the Royal Geographical Society of London, who was cruelly murdered at Darkot, 18 July 1870, on his journey to explore the Pamir steppe. This monument is erected to a gallant officer and accomplished traveller at the instance of the Royal Geographical Society."

Since his death, Hayward has received little recognition. He stands alone, however, among the explorers of the Western Himalaya in the difficulty of the areas he surveyed and the small size of his expeditions – usually just himself and three to six porters and bearers.

== Miscellaneous ==
In the 1930s Colonel Reginald Schomberg, a British traveller, passed through Darkot and said local families still possessed Hayward's pistol, telescope and saddle. A London auction sold six topographical watercolours by Hayward in the 1950s that turned up in the Bombay bazaar.

Sir Henry Newbolt wrote the poem "He Fell Among Thieves" about Hayward's death. Welsh composer David John Thomas (1881-1928), also known by his bardic name as Afan Thomas, composed a cantata based on this poem.

== Biography: "Murder in the Hindu Kush" ==
A biography of Hayward, entitled Murder in the Hindu Kush: George Hayward and the Great Game, by travel writer Tim Hannigan was published by the History Press in 2011. His story is also covered briefly in The Great Game by Peter Hopkirk, and Explorers of the Western Himalayas by John Keay.

== See also ==
- Geostrategy in Central Asia
