= Robert Barkley Shaw =

English explorer

- Born: 12 July 1839; Upper Clapton, London
- Died: 15 June 1879 (aged 39)
- Citizenship: United Kingdom
- Education: Marlborough College; Trinity College, Cambridge
- Occupations: Explorer and diplomat

Robert Barkley Shaw, CIE, (12 July 1839 – 15 June 1879) was a British explorer and diplomat. He was an early English traveller to Kashgar in Central Asia, and he established a relation with the local leader; he was later a member of a diplomatic expedition to the area. He became a diplomat in northern India and in Mandalay.

== Early life ==
Shaw was born in Upper Clapton, London, and was educated at schools on the continent, at Marlborough College, and at Trinity College, Cambridge. Unable to recover his health after an attack of rheumatic fever, he gave up the idea of entering the army, and in 1859 he went to Kangra in the Himalayas, where he settled as a tea-planter.

== Exploring Central Asia ==
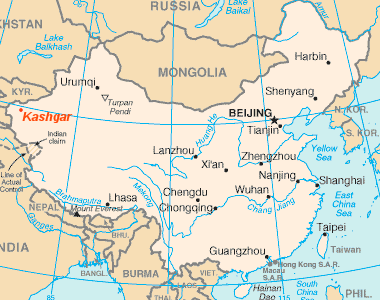
Map of present-day China showing the location of Kashgar

He had an adventurous spirit, and was interested in exploring the then almost unknown country north of the Karakoram; after one or two tentative excursions, he started in May 1868 for Eastern Turkestan, travelling as a merchant.

In September 1868 Shaw agreed to meet rival Englishman George Hayward around the camp-fire in the mountains between Lashgar and Yarkand. Shaw's mission was not military in character but primarily commercial. But both men recognised the value of mapping the uncharted territory of the Pamir Mountains. Shaw went on ahead while his colleague descended into the river gorges of the Karakoram. Shaw sent gifts ahead to Yakub Beg, hoping to meet him first.

He reached Yarkand where he was cordially received on 8 December. Hayward had also arrived; and they continued living in separate accommodations. They could see the snow-capped Pamirs and the Taklamakan Desert sands beyond. They were the first Englishmen to visit these places.

At Kashgar on 11 January 1869 Shaw was escorted into the palace, and on the next morning conducted a successful meeting with Yakub Beg, who had recently overthrown Chinese rule and was head of the region. In a detailed diary account Shaw described the other-worldly experience of "this assemblage of thousands." Shaw spoke a little Persian, but still managed to convey the purpose of his visit; to open up a trade route, particularly of Indian tea. Suitably impressed by the wares on offer, Yakub Beg declared "enjoy yourself a few days", while Shaw later retorted in his diary that "the King dismissed me graciously."

Both Hayward and Shaw found themselves under house arrest; but in secrecy they made contacts outside the walls of Kashgar. One such correspondent called simply Mirza may have been a double agent; but Mirza Shuja was a perfectly honourable Indian muslim who needed help. It emerged unbeknown to Shaw that Mirza was a Pundit in the Indian Army, who had been despatched across the border to take a fix in the stars on the roof of the world. For three months, Shaw heard nothing from the indian, who caused fear in St Petersburg where the Russians believed he was sent to start a muslim revolt in Central Asia. Unknown to Shaw, Yakub Beg had long sought diplomatic recognition from St Petersburg. But when he met the King again in 5 April 1869, he was greeted with, "I declare you, my brother." Yakub Beg sought an alliance with 'The Queen of England' and the 'Lord Sahib', the Viceroy tasking Shaw with the burden of advice; Shaw demanded that he Hayward and Mirza should be allowed to go free.

Shaw returned by the Karakoram Pass to India. The verdict was that the expedition took daring and adventurous spirit but the intelligence results were critical in the closing decades of the Great Game. Securing new friendships on the Silk Road at a critical stage helped keep the Silk Road open to East to West traders. Furthermore Shaw was recognised officially, being in service of the British Empire helping to set the seal on a new understanding with Russia that would be concluded by his nephew, Francis Younghusband. On the obverse Yakub Beg was targeted by the Russians for assassination, closing the Silk Road that Shaw had hoped to trade tea caravans. Shaw concurred with the theoretical land hunger of the Tsar for territorial expansion into Kashgaria; to invade India, the Russians would enter Chang Lung Pass, surmount past Leh to the Ladakh and down into the plains.

== Mission to Eastern Turkestan ==
Prime Minister of England William Gladstone believed in a buffer state policy to protect British India from invasion; built on a network of diplomatic alliance and friendships. Economic liberalism and free trade aimed to open up routes to the Far East through the Karakorams. Shaw estimated there were potentially 60 million customers in Kashgaria region waiting for his tea caravans. Lord Mayo, the Viceroy of India authorised Shaw to join a new expedition in 1869 under Sir Thomas Douglas Forsyth, a senior political officer to cement the friendship with Yakub Beg and pre-empt Russian aggression.

However, when the mission reached Yarkand Forsyth discovered that Yakub Beg was 1,000 miles to the east entreating for peace with the Russians. Shaw was an enigmatic character, hard to know and little understood; when the party returned they learnt that how risky the strategy would be for Lord Mayo; the 1870s was a period of relentless Russian annexation. But as a Forward Policy emerged after 1874 Shaw's warnings proved well-founded of India's vulnerability of the Pamir Passes and the significance of the Kingdom of Kashgaria to British Afghanistan.

== Later career ==
In 1872 the Royal Geographical Society awarded Shaw the patron's gold medal; Sir Henry Rawlinson stated that this distinction was given him "for the services he had rendered to the cause of geography in exploring Eastern Turkestan; and above all for his very valuable astronomical observations."

In recognition of his service to government, Lord Mayo appointed him to the political department, and he was made British joint commissioner in Ladakh (in the Himalayas in present-day northern India). In 1875, he went to Yarkand in charge of the ratified treaty made by Thomas Douglas Forsyth the previous year.

In 1878 he was appointed resident at Mandalay in Upper Burma. This was the central and northern part of present-day Myanmar; Upper Burma was an independent kingdom, while Lower Burma was part of the British Empire. During his period in this post, king Mindon of Burma died in October 1878 and was succeeded by king Thibaw. Shaw died unmarried in Mandalay on 15 June 1879 of rheumatic fever.

== Works ==
- A Visit to High Tartary, Yarkund, and Kashgar, London, 1871
- A Sketch of the Turki Language as spoken in Eastern Turkestan, Lahore, 1875
- The Ghalchah Languages, Calcutta, 1876
