= Elephant polo =

Variant of polo played riding elephants

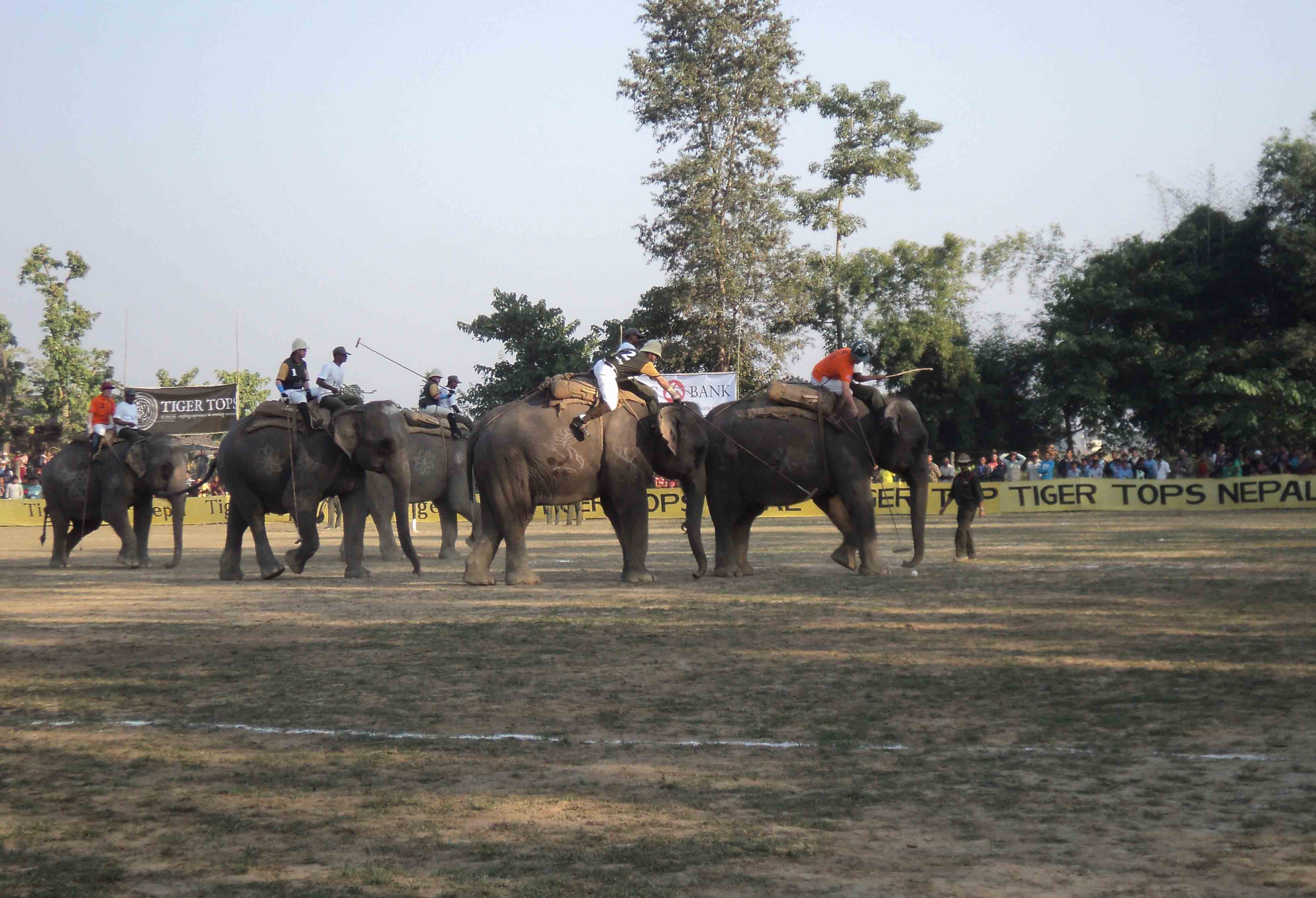
- Elephant Polo World Cup 2012, Meghauli, Nepal
- Highest governing body: World Elephant Polo Association (WEPA)

Characteristics
- Contact: No
- Mixed-sex: Yes
- Type: Outdoor recreation

Presence
- Country or region: Worldwide
- Olympic: No
- Paralympic: No

Elephant polo is a variant of polo played while riding elephants. It is played in Nepal, and Thailand. England and Scotland regularly field teams. Equipment consists of a standard polo ball and a 1.8 metres (5.9 ft) to 3 metres (9.8 ft) cane (similar to bamboo) sticks with a polo mallet head on the end. The pitch is three-quarters of the length of a standard polo pitch, due to the lower speed of the elephants. Two people ride each elephant; the elephants are steered by mahouts, while the player tells the mahout which way to go and hits the ball.

== Origin ==
Elephant polo originated in Meghauli, Nepal. Tiger Tops in Nepal remains the headquarters of elephant polo and the site of the World Elephant Polo Championships.

Elephant polo in Nepal and Thailand is played under the auspices of the World Elephant Polo Association. WEPA enforces strict rules regarding elephant welfare and game play. Other tournaments, such as those played in India and Sri Lanka, are managed independently of each other and the World Elephant Polo Association. Sri Lanka held an annual tournament in Galle under the auspices of the Ceylon Elephant Polo Association, however this ended in 2007 after an out of control elephant damaged several cars.

Allegations of cruel treatment of polo elephants, made by People for the Ethical Treatment of Animals, have led to match cancellation, sponsorship withdrawal and the removal of references to elephant polo records in the Guinness Book of World Records.

The Thailand Elephant Polo Association announced in October 2018 that it will end polo matches in Thailand. A polo tournament had been held annually at Anantara Hotel Bangkok owned by Minor Hotels.

== See also ==
- Yak polo
- Elephant beauty pageant
