= Yak polo =

Mongolian sport

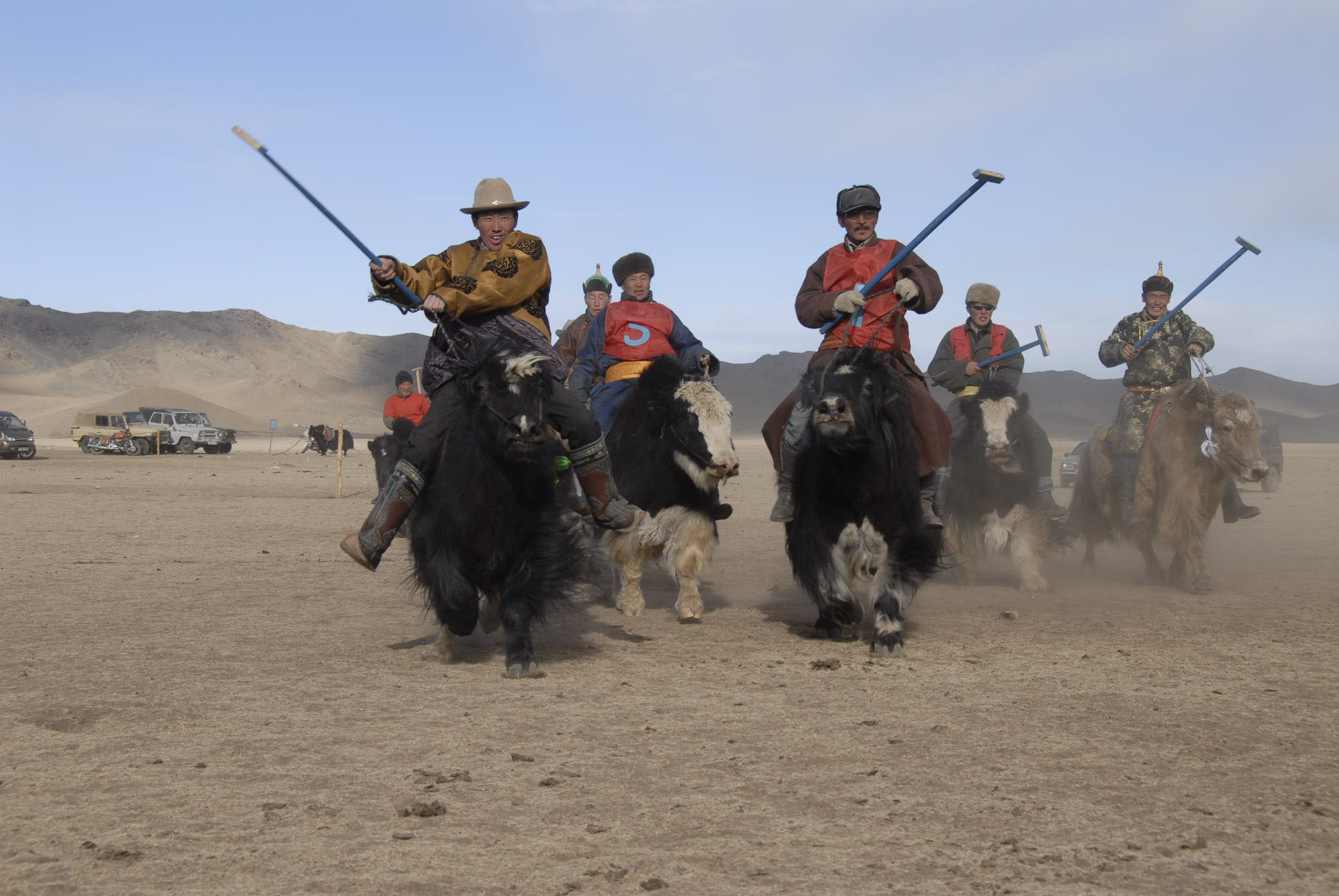
Yak polo in Mongolia

Yak polo (or sarlagan polo) is a variant of the sport polo played on yaks instead of on horseback. The sport was first developed in Mongolia in the early 2000s. It is played in Mongolia and north Pakistan, where it is popular with both locals and tourists. Yak polo has similar rules and gameplay to horse polo, with the main differences being a smaller pitch and longer playing periods.

== Development ==
Yak polo was originally developed in 2004 in Mongolia, both as a tourist attraction and as a way to draw attention to the vulnerable wild yak. Tsedendamba Monhzul and her family were the ones to set up the first yak polo team. The sport grew extremely quickly, with the team soon playing show games at Ulaanbaatar.

== Contemporary yak polo ==
=== Mongolia ===
Yak polo is extremely popular with both tourists and locals in Mongolia. The Mongolian Association of Sarlagan Polo was founded in 2006 and has organized four games per week since then. During the winter yak polo is played on iced-over rivers, as yaks can be trained to play on a variety of surfaces.

The sport is also played at summer festivals. The Yak Festival, held every July 23 in Bat-Ölzii, has yak polo as a main event. This festival is popular both with tourists and locals.

=== Pakistan ===
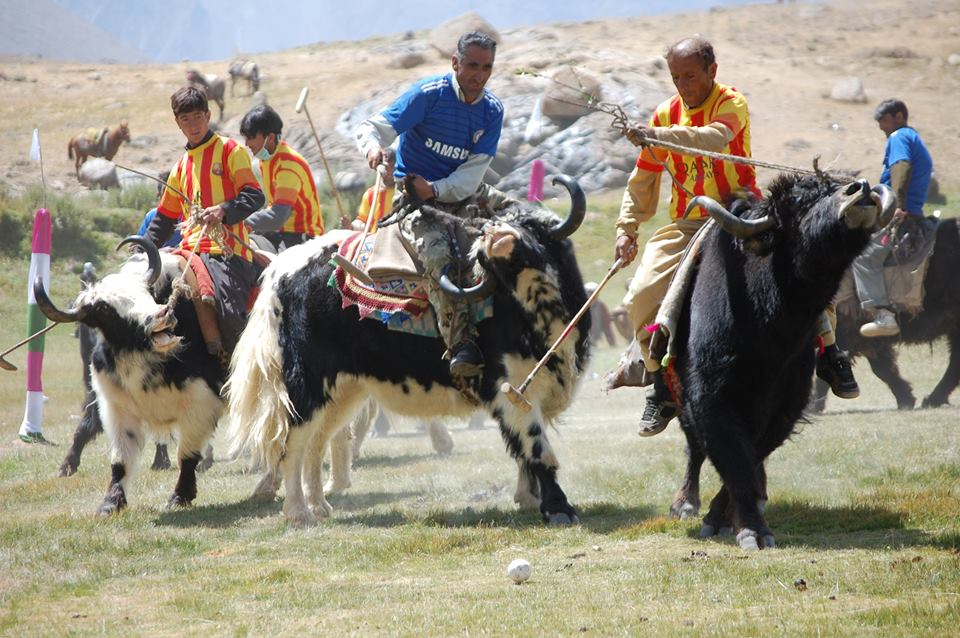
Yak polo at Barogil Festival, 2015

In Pakistan, Yak polo is played in the Hindu Kush region, primarily in Chitral District.

Jashan-e-Broghol (Barogil Festival), a festival held every July in Broghil, has had yak polo as the main attraction since 2005. Up to 2,000 people attend the festival yearly, with 1,500 people attending in 2015.

== Rules and gameplay ==
Yak polo has similar rules to horse polo. Two teams of 3-5 people riding yaks compete to score goals, with one person on each team being the goalkeeper and polo sticks being used to hit the balls. The playing field is smaller than that of horse polo due to yaks being slower and less agile than horses. In Mongolia, games are typically split into two periods of fifteen minutes each.

Due to the relative clumsiness of yaks, it is not uncommon for players to fall off during games.

== See also ==
- Yak skiing, another sport (or tourist attraction) involving yaks.
- Horse polo
- Elephant polo
