= Chikaar =

Chikaar چکار
- Interactive map of Chikaar چکار
- Elevation: 3,659 m (12,005 ft)

Third Approach
- Location: Pakistan
- Range: Hindukush Mountains
- Coordinates: 36°48′46″N 73°19′23″E

Chikaar (Urdu: چکار) is a high plain and gateway to Darkot Pass. The border between Chitral District and Gupis-Yasin District of Gilgit-Baltistan. It is a small village of around 200 households. Landscape around the village offers superb scenery of clouds and sky piercing peaks. In the last decade it has got significant importance due to the relatively easy route that it offers towards Darkot Pass.

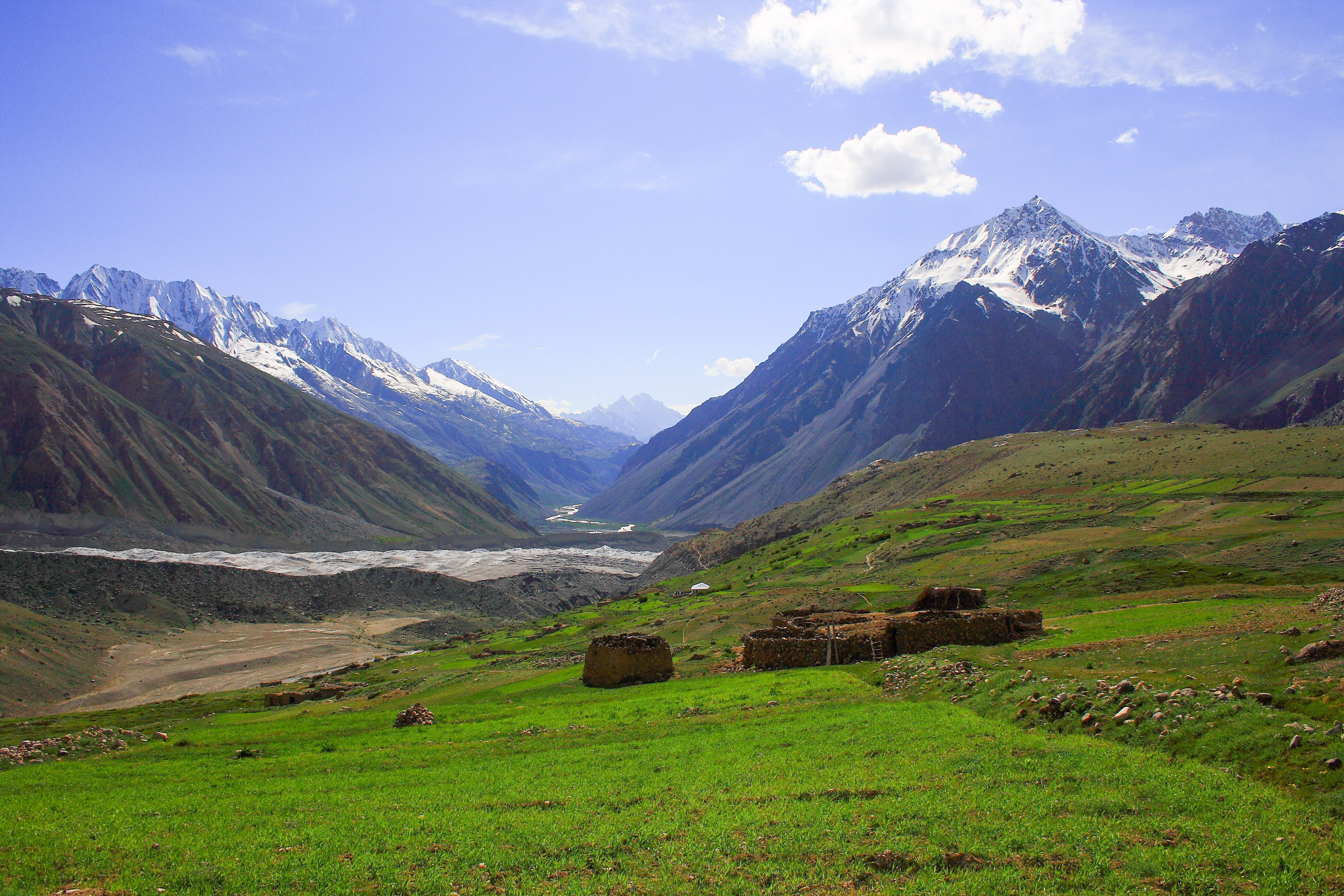
Chikaar, District Chitral, Khyber Pakhtonkhwa, Pakistan

Climbers and trekkers take porters from this point towards Darkot base camp. Though electricity is not available but few of the houses have solar panels to run home appliances. Usually trekkers take the benefit out of their hospitality and get their electronic equipment i.e. phone, camera etc. charged through solar panels.

An upper and next stage is Darkoot base-camp (often quoted as Chikaar Base). Chikaar base-camp is located at the left side of the accumulation zone of the Darkoot glacier. Trekkers and climbers make stopovers here to start their journey towards Darkot pass from Darkot glacier. Distance from Chikaar to Darkot Base-camp takes an ascending hike of 5–6 hours.

== See also ==
- Darkot Pass
- Baroghil Valley
