= Darkot Pass =

Pakistani mountain pass

- درۂ درکوٹ
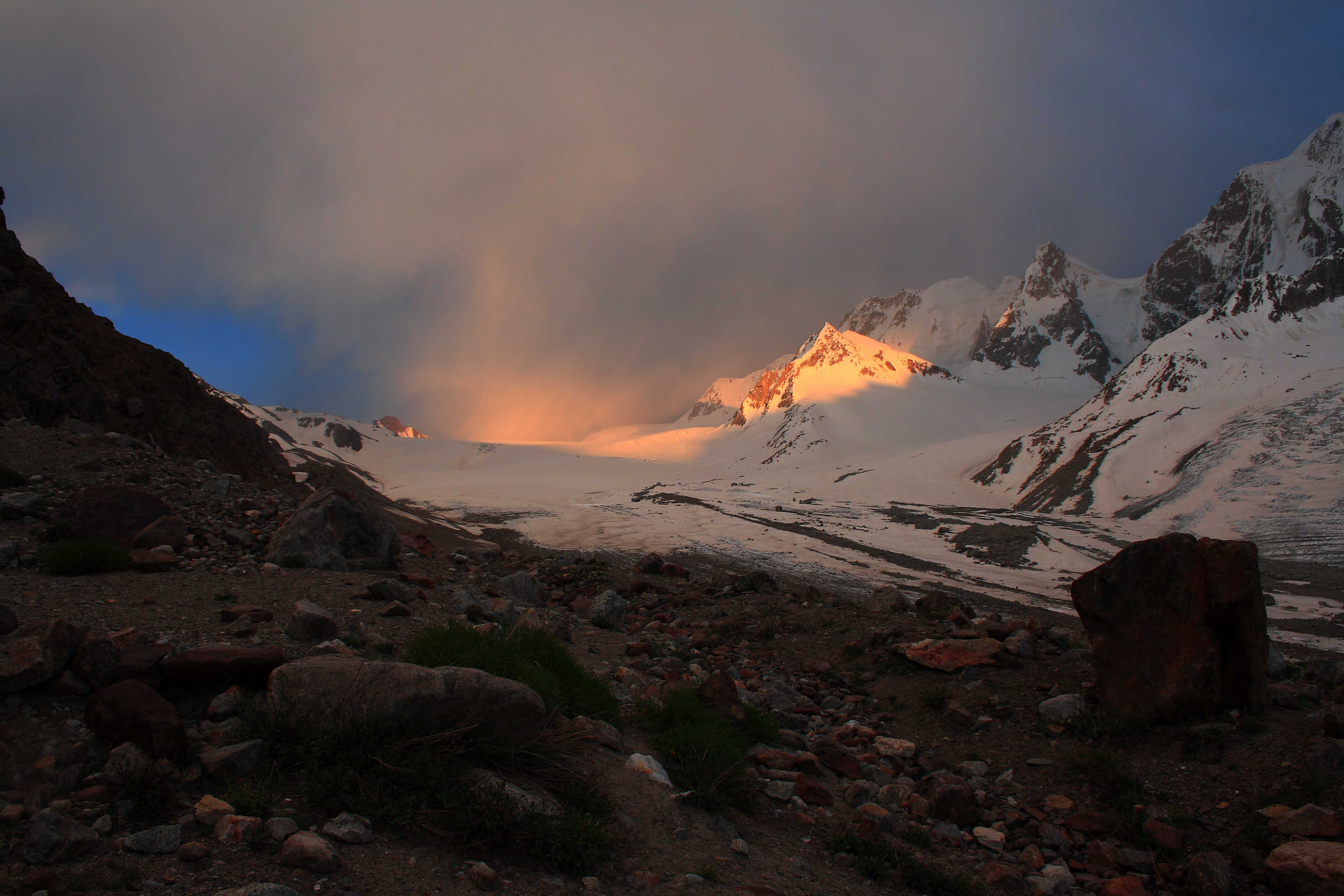
- Darkot Pass in Gilgit Baltistan, Pakistan

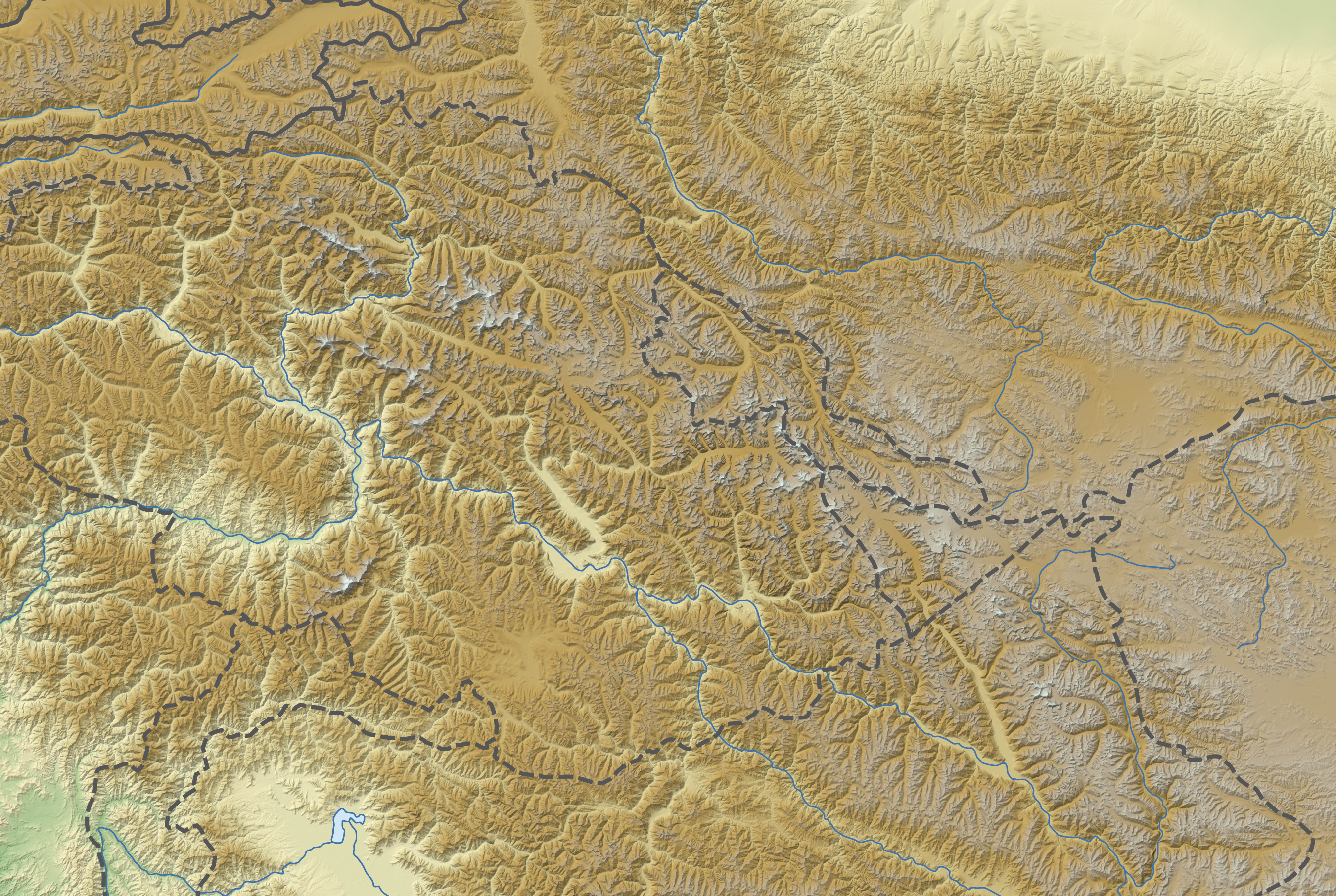
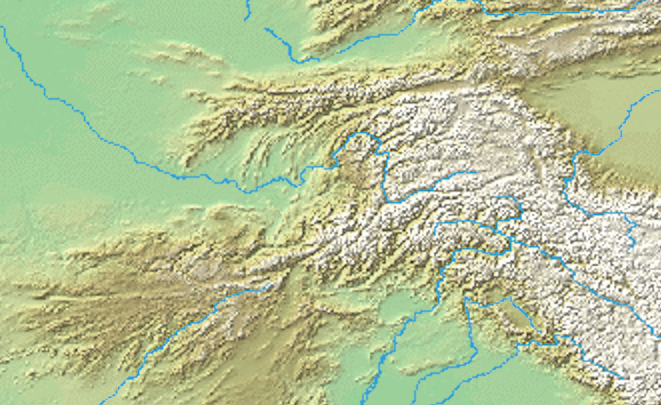
- Location within Karakoram Location within Gilgit Baltistan Location within Pakistan Location within Pamir
- Elevation: 4,703 m (15,430 ft)

Location
- Location: Gilgit-Baltistan / Khyber Paktunkhwa, Pakistan
- Range: Hindukush Mountains
- Coordinates: 36°44′42″N 73°25′59″E

Darkot pass (Urdu: درۂ درکوٹ), also known as "Darku," is a high mountain pass with an elevation of 4,703 m (15,430 ft). Open from May through October, it connects the Baroghil Valley in Chitral with the Rawat Valley in the Ghizer District of Gilgit, Pakistan. It is notable for being the site of the 1870 death of British explorer George Hayward during the Great Game

The pass is about 16 km to the east of Koyo Zom (Zum) (6872m), the highest peak in Ghizer District. The border between Chitral and Northern Areas runs through the pass over Darkot Glacier. Eight miles to the south is Darkot village on the Darkot River, a small tributary of Ghizer River). To the southwest of Darkot pass is Chitral. 16 km to the northwest of the pass is Chilmarabad, a village one mile south of the Boroghil pass.

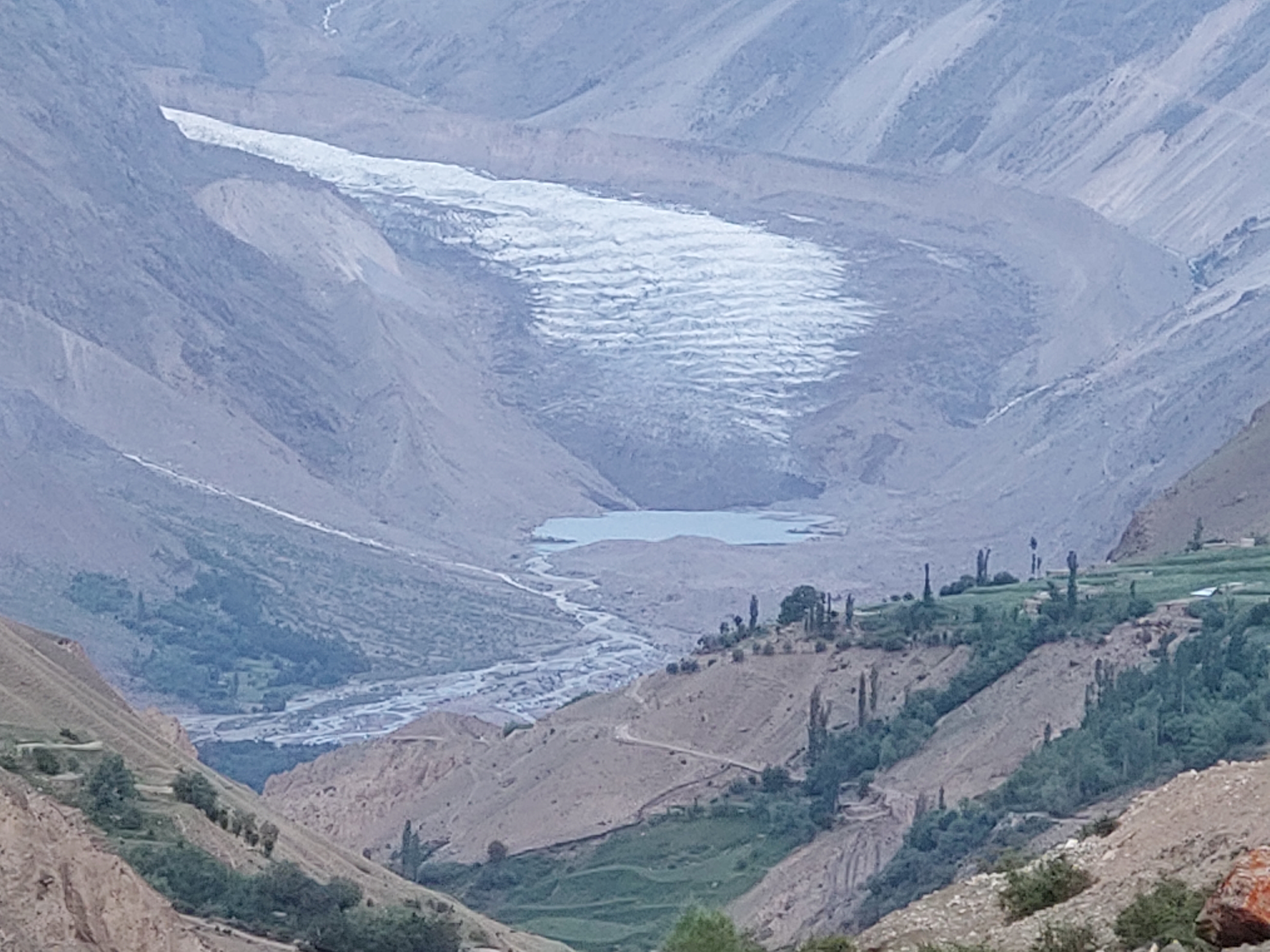
Darkut is the Hazardous place due to climate change, Glaciers and fresh flood occupied the land of Darkut, Yasin

== See also ==
- Chikaar
- Baroghil Valley
