= Barmas, Gilgit =

Locality in Gilgit, Pakistan

Barmas (Urdu: برمس) is name of a locality in district Gilgit, Gilgit−Baltistan, Pakistan. It is one of the oldest settlements in the Gilgit District. Barmas is divided into two units(محلہ), Barmas pine(برمس پائین) and Barmas Bala(برمس بالا). Barmas Gah is a stream that departs from the namesake "Khur" (in Shina) means a source of fresh water, can afford water supply to Gilgit including the localities nearby.

== See also ==
- Dadi Jawari
