= Plump banded gecko =

Scientific classification
- Kingdom: Animalia
- Phylum: Chordata
- Class: Reptilia
- Order: Squamata
- Suborder: Gekkota
- Family: Gekkonidae
- Genus: Cyrtodactylus
- Species: C. dattanensis

Binomial name
- Cyrtodactylus dattanensis (Khan, 1980)

Synonyms
- Gymnodactylus dattanensis Khan, 1980; Tenuidactylus dattensis [sic] Szczerbak & Golubev, 1986 (ex errore); Tenuidactylus dattanensis — Khan & Tasnim, 1990; Gonydactylus dattanensis — Kluge, 1991; Cyrtopodion dattanensis — Rösler, 2000; Siwaligekko dattanensis — Khan, 2003

Species of lizard

The plump banded gecko (Cyrtodactylus dattanensis), also known commonly as Khan's bow-fingered gecko, is a species of gecko, a lizard in the family Gekkonidae. The species is endemic to Pakistan.

== Geographic range ==
C. dattanensis is found in northwestern Pakistan.

== Reproduction ==
C. dattanensis is oviparous.
