= Hispar (disambiguation) =

Hispar may refer to:

- Hispar village
- Hispar Glacier - one of the largest glaciers outside polar region
- Hispar Muztagh - a sub-range of the Karakoram mountain range.
- Hispar Pass (or Hispar La) - a high-altitude, non-technical mountain pass in the Karakoram Range in Pakistan.
- Hispar River - the river that forms from the melt water of the Hispar Glacier
- Hispar Valley - is the last Valley of Nagar Valley in the Gilgit-Baltistan region of Pakistan
