= Snow Lake (Pakistan) =

High-altitude glacial basin in Pakistan

Coordinates: 36°0′N 75°35′E

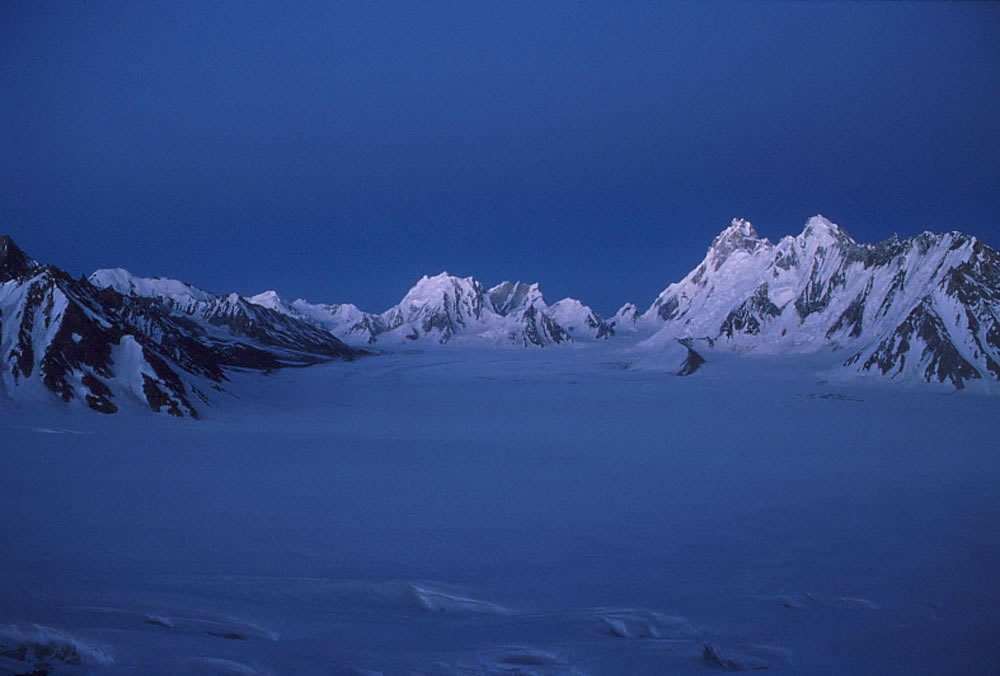
Snow Lake in twilight

Snow Lake or Lukpe Lawo is a high-altitude glacial basin in the Karakoram mountain range in the Gilgit-Baltistan region of northern Pakistan. It is not a lake, despite its name.

Snow Lake is located 16,000 feet (4,877 m) above sea level and is approximately 10 miles (16 km) wide. The basin lies at the head of the Biafo and Hispar glaciers, which spread down from the Hispar Pass in opposite directions, forming a 61-mile (100 km) river of ice that is among the world's longest continuous glacier systems outside of the polar regions.

== Famous visitors ==
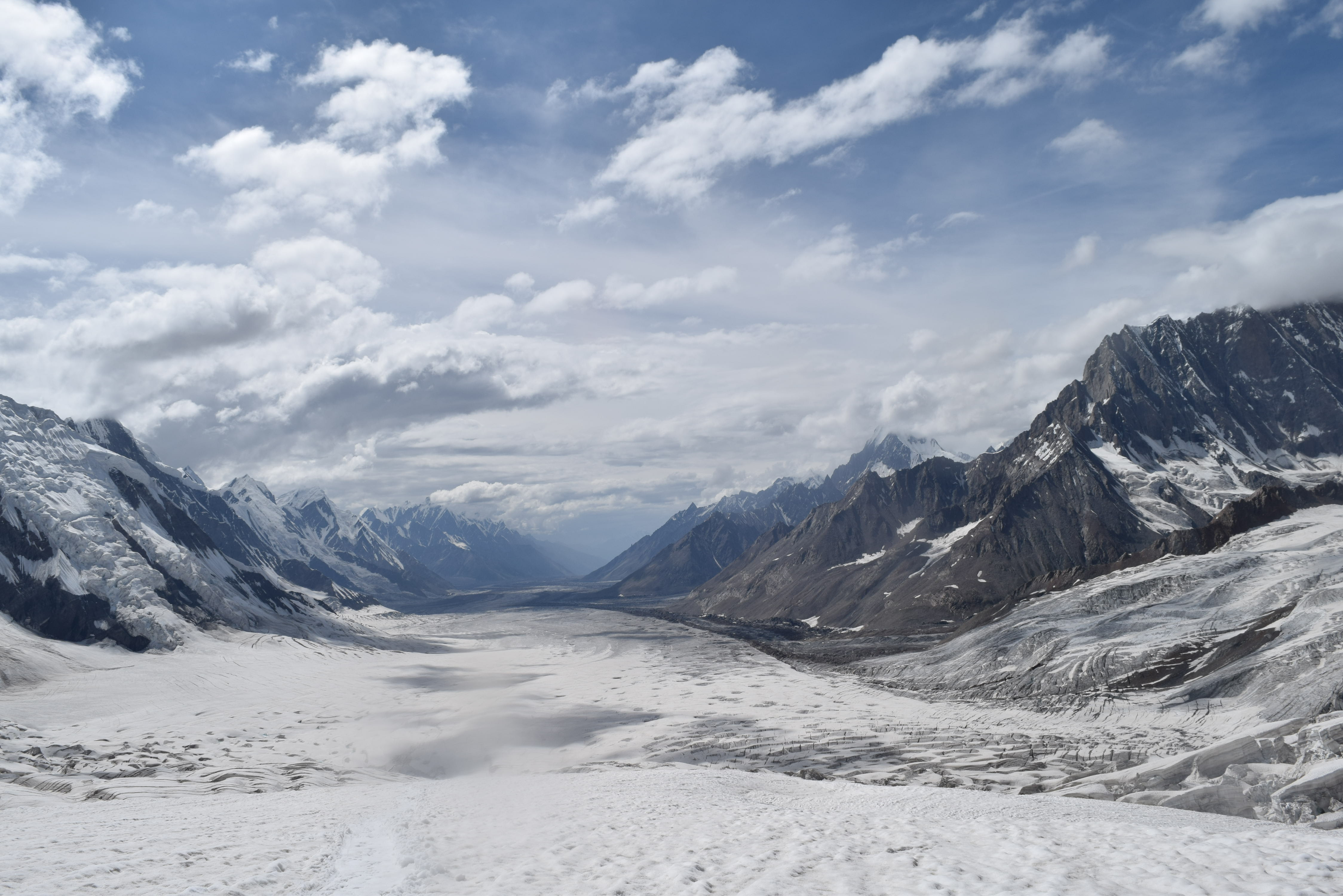
Snow Lake

Martin Conway, the first foreign visitor, gave Snow Lake the name in 1892. Conway described Snow Lake as "beyond all comparison the finest view of mountains it has ever been my lot to behold, nor do I believe the world can hold a finer." Snow Lake is very difficult to reach, however, and only about 200 people manage to reach it per year. In 1899, the husband-wife team of William Hunter Workman and Fanny Bullock Workman came and speculated that Snow Lake might be an ice-cap like those in the polar regions, from which glaciers flowed out in all directions, and estimated its total size at 300 square miles (116 square kilometers).

== Getting there ==
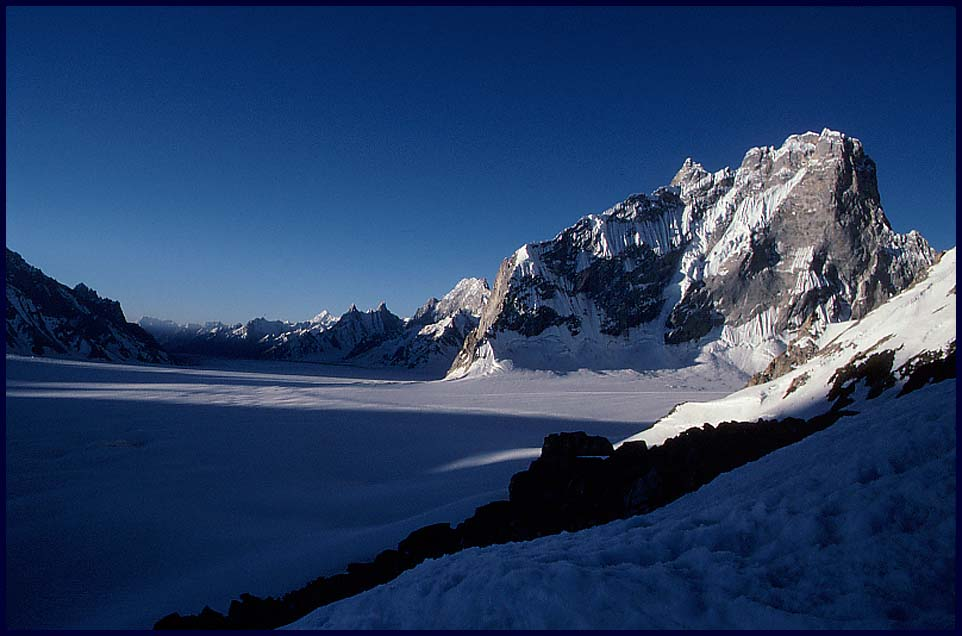
Looking east to Snow Lake

The journey to Snow Lake typically begins in Skardu, which can be reached by plane or jeep from Islamabad. From Skardu, a jeep takes travelers through the Braldu Gorge to the village of Askole. The trek from Askole initially proceeds towards K2, then turns northwest up the Biafo Glacier to Snow Lake. The descent differs from the ascent, going through the Hunza Valley and ending in Gilgit, from where a return to Islamabad can be arranged by plane or jeep. A guide is mandatory for the trek as it visits restricted regions within the Central Karakoram National Park.
