= Nagar River =

Nagar River can refer to:

== Bangladesh ==
- Nagar River (Rajshahi), a river beginning in Bogra District and joining the Atrai River in Natore District
- Nagar River (Rangpur), a river that crosses the border from India in Panchagarh district and returns to India in Thakurgaon District

== India ==
- Nagar River (India), a river in the Uttar Dinajpur district of West Bengal

== Pakistan ==
- Hispar River (a.k.a. Nagar River), a river that joins the Hunza River in Gilgit-Baltistan
