= Dave Manby =

David Manby
- Born: 23 July 1954 (age 71); Johannesburg
- Occupations: Kayaker, Engineer

David Manby is a canoeist or kayaker from the UK and was a national champion in slalom canoeing C-1. He is considered a pioneer in the sport of canoeing and was involved in the British expedition of the first descent of the Dudh Kosi river.

== Early life ==
Dave was born to Michael and Eve (née Levick) Manby in Johannesburg, South Africa where his father was the headmaster of the junior school at St John's College. When he was 8 he moved with his family to Shrewsbury, England, where his father became the headmaster of Prestfelde School which he attended. Later he attended Ellesmere College and it was here that he first learnt to canoe. He also attended the University of Nottingham

== Dudh Kosi ==
In 1976, at the age of 21, Dave was asked to join five other kayakers in a team of ten on the famous first descent of the Dudh Kosi, the river running off Mount Everest the trip leader was Mike Jones. The team left in July and began the 7,500 mile drive in a Transit mini-bus to Kathmandu. Once there a further 180 mile hike, with all the equipment including 10 kayaks, had to be undertaken to reach Everest Base Camp. This was the starting point of the pioneering paddle which involved some of the hardest white water canoed to date. Dave himself had one close call when his boat capsized and in the freezing water was unable to Eskimo roll. The team got him out of the river safe. The whole expedition was filmed by Leo Dickinson and was shown on British prime time television in Boxing Day 1976. The film itself won over 50 international awards, and has recently been remastered in Los Angeles and made into a DVD. It was shown again in the UK on BBC 4 on 8 January 2014.

The river is extreme white water. Normally it can't be used for water sports. The first kayak trip was made 1976 by a British expedition under the leadership of Mike Jones.

== After Everest ==
Dave was involved in more first descent expeditions including the attempted 1978 K2 trip on the Braldu River (Pakistan) in which Mike Jones died while trying to save a companion. Other expeditions include early descent of the Coruh River in Eastern Turkey and the Sezar, Dez and Bakhtiaria Rivers in the Zagros Mountains in Iran. He has also written a book "Many Rivers to Run"
