= Kunyang Chhish East =

Mountain in Pakistan

Khunyang Chhish East
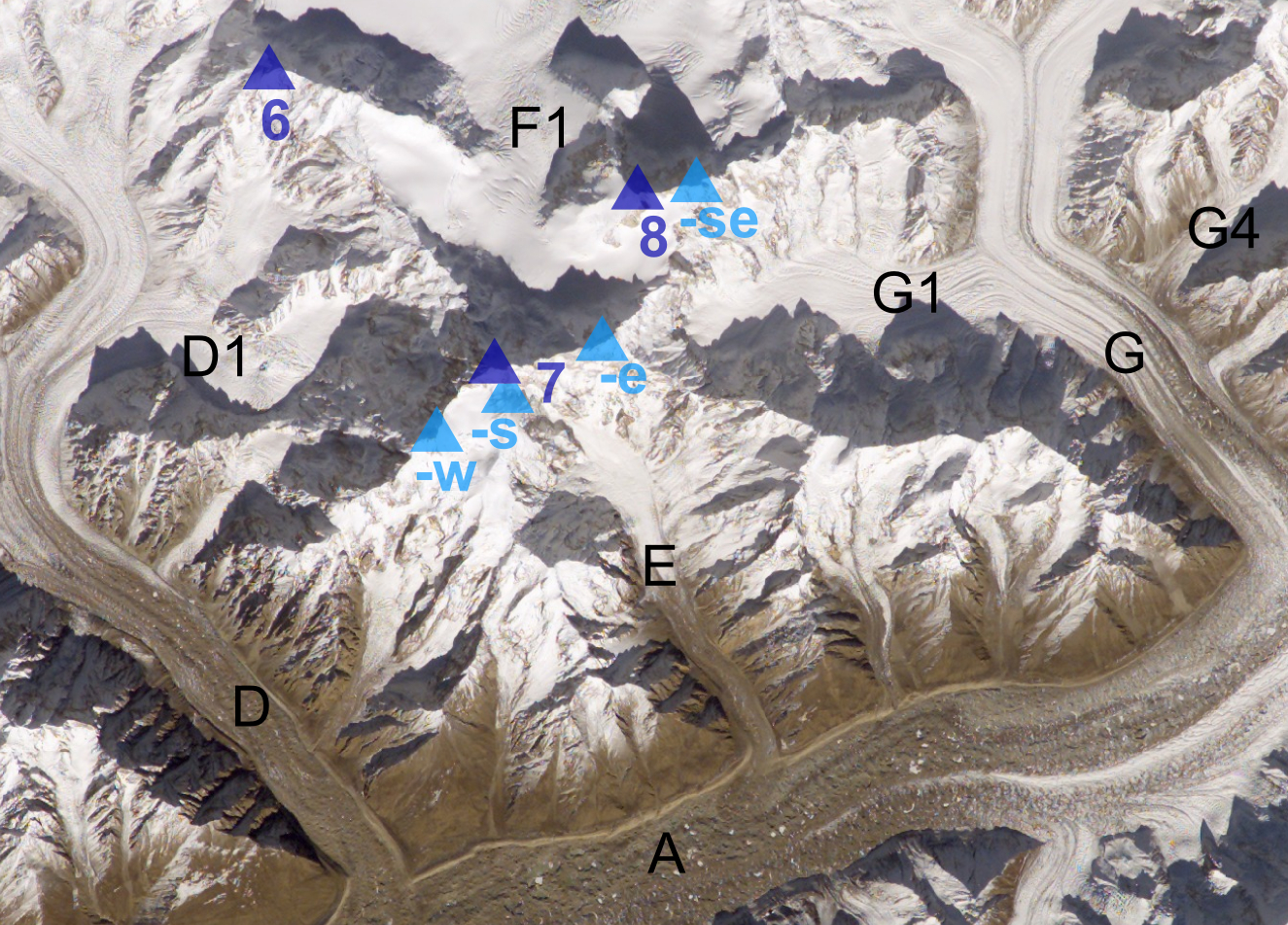
- Khunyang Chhish (centre left) and Hispar glacier (below) - NASA ISS image

Highest point
- Elevation: 7,400 m (24,300 ft)
- Prominence: 260 m (850 ft)
- Listing: Mountains of Pakistan
- Coordinates: 36°11′48″N 75°13′34″E

Geography
- Location within Pakistan
- Parent range: Hispar Muztagh, Karakoram

Climbing
- First ascent: 18 July 2013 by Hansjörg Auer, Matthias Auer and Simon Anthamatten

Kunyang or Khunyang Chhish East is a 7,400 metres (24,300 ft) mountain in the Khunyang Chhish massif (a subrange of the Karakoram mountains of Pakistan). It is separated by a 7,160 metres (23,490 ft) pass from the main summit 2 kilometres (1.2 mi) to the West and has a 2,700 metres (8,900 ft) Southwest face. On July 18, 2013 Hansjörg Auer, Matthias Auer and Simon Anthamatten made the first ascent over this wall, which had been widely regarded as one of the great remaining problems in alpinism.

== Climbing history ==
Before the first ascent, there had been four known (legal) attempts at the summit of Khunyang Chhish East.

=== June 2003, Korean team ===
The first attempt to scale the peak took place in June 2003. A Korean expedition, however, gave up at 6100m feeling it was too difficult to continue the climb in a safe manner. Since their Camp 2 had been established near Ice Cake Peak, six out of ten members of the expedition (including Park Sung Man, Yen Yong Hum, Shim Yeong Keon, Jang ke Seob, Ko Jung Sig and Kim Man Kun) decided to ascend the summit of this 6,450m peak on the south ridge of Kunyang Chhish before returning to base camp.

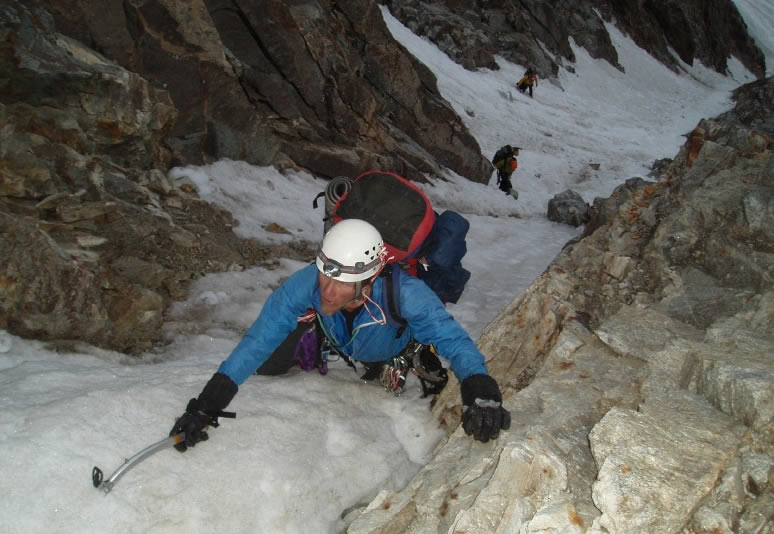
Ian Welsted, a Canadian climber in a gully during the 2006 expedition to Kunyang Chhish East.

=== July 2003, Polish team ===
Another attempt came in July 2003 by a Polish expedition consisting of Grzegorz Skorek (who died in 2004 returning from his climb of the 6995m north face of Khan Tengri), Janusz Gołąb and Stanislaw Piechuch. The first objective of the team was to acclimatize by climbing Ice Cake Peak, which they reached on August 5, 2003. Yet the team's main goal of climbing Khunyang Chhish East in alpine style was postponed until August 15 because of the weather conditions. After a period of heavy rain and snow the three decided to make their summit attempt. Due to continued unfavorable weather conditions, having made three bivouacs and reaching the height of 6700m the team retreated.

=== September 2006, American team ===
In September 2006 two Americans Steve House and Vince Anderson made their bid for the summit. Despite two weeks of attempts, House and Anderson didn't manage to complete their initial objective---acclimatizing climb of Ice Cake Peak, reaching only 5900 meters in continuing bad weather and high winds. The climb of the southwest face of Kunyang Chhish East began on September 10, 2003. Once again the summit was not reached, the climbers stopped 300m from the top. The climbers cited inadequate acclimatization, tiredness, cold winds as reasons for turning back.

=== July 2006, Canadian/Polish team ===
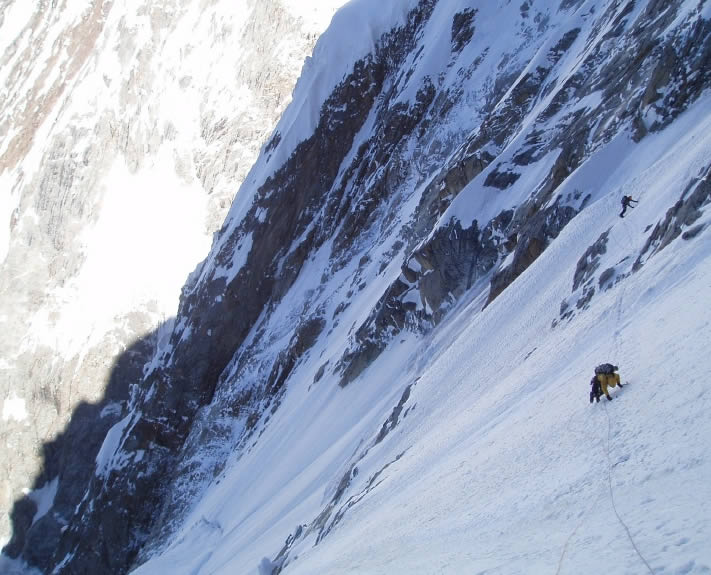
Canadian/Polish climbers traversing the first ledge of Kunyang Chhish East, 2006.

In 2006 a Canadian team including a Polish climber Raphael Slawinski (who had emigrated to Canada ("Rafał Sławiński - gość 7. KFG". Wspinanie.pl.)), Ben Firth, Eamonn Walsh and Ian Welsted made two attempts on the southwest face of Kunyang Chhish East. The quartet had first opted for an acclimatizing climb of the summit of the 6,450m Ice Cake, which they succeeded in reaching after two bivouacs. The first attempt at the summit of Kunyang Chhish East, up the southwest face of the mountain was on July 22. After reaching over 6,550m and two bivouacs, the combination of altitude and stomach problems of two members the climbers turned around, leaving some of their supplies hanging from the Polish anchor left by the previous expedition.

The second attempt was scheduled for July 31. In the meantime the conditions on the southface had worsened with much of the snow melting and turning to bare ice. Another danger was rockfall and water cascading down the face as the afternoon warmed up. With increasing danger the Canadian climbers retreated from 5,900m on August 1, 2006.

=== First Ascent ===
Austrian Hansjörg Auer and Swiss Simon Anthamatten set up basecamp on June 12 and acclimatized, amongst others by climbing 6,400 m Ice Cake Peak. Due to a thumb injury, Hansjorg's brother Matthias could only join later and, for a lack of acclimatization, could not participate in the first two attempts on the 2,700 m southwest face between June 25 and 28 and on July 2. After a period of poor weather, all three started a final try on July 14. After spending two nights at camp 3 at 6700 m, the winds calmed down and the team reached the summit over a spectacular corniced ridge at 12:30 pm on July 18. This ascent was nominated as one of the five finalists for the 2014 Piolet d'Or.
