= Braldu River =

River in Pakistan

Braldu River བྲཱལྡུ་ཙང་པོ།
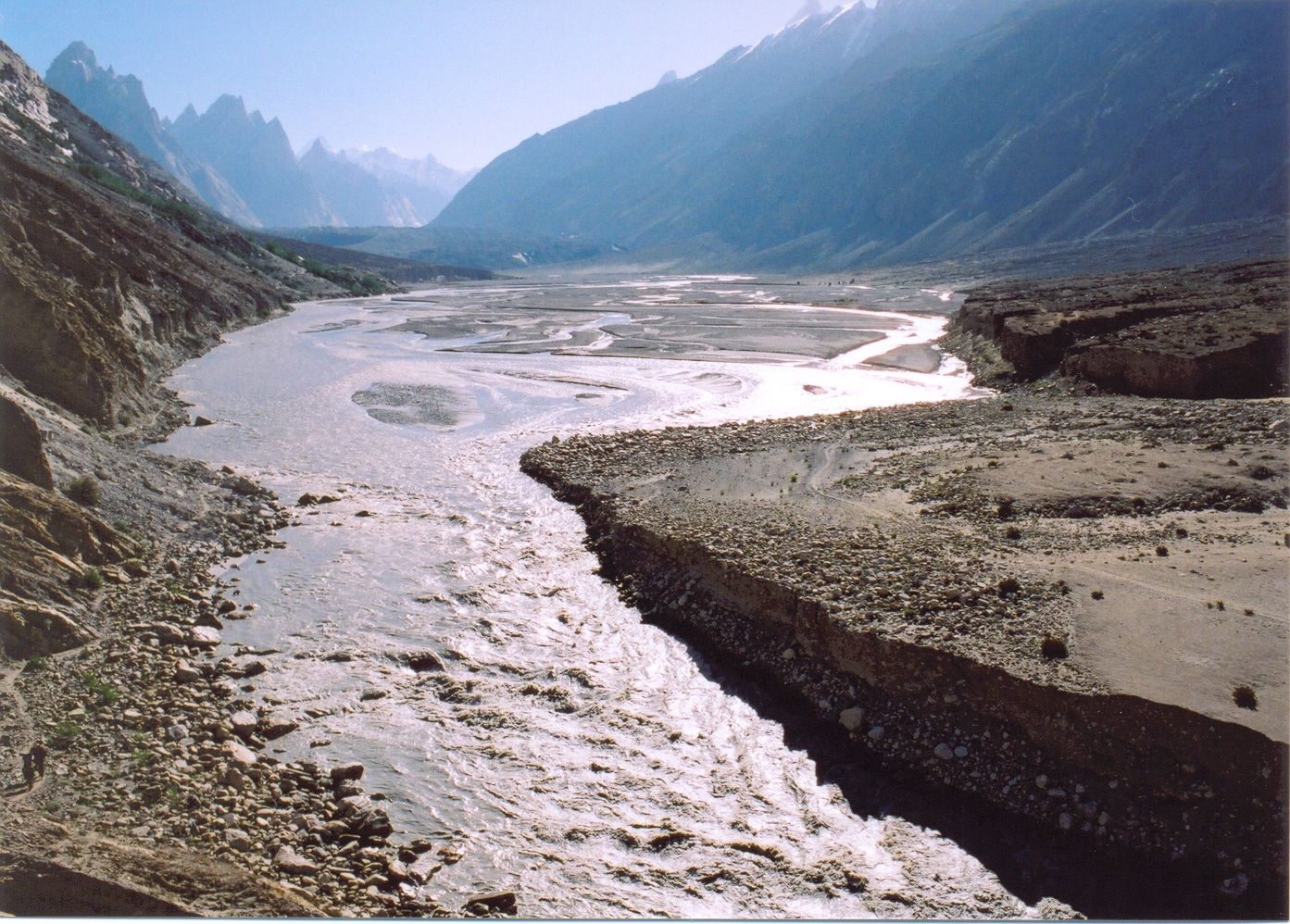
- The Braldu River, with the Baltoro Glacier in the background

Location
- Country: Pakistan
- State: Gilgit Baltistan
- District: Shigar

Physical characteristics
- Source: 35.691982°N 76.172345°E
  - location: Baltoro Glacier and Biafo Glacier, Shigar
  - elevation: 3,620 m (11,880 ft)
- Mouth: 35.655482°N 75.485771°E
  - location: Basha Basna River to form Shigar River at Tigstun, Shigar
  - elevation: 2,330 m (7,640 ft)
- Length: 78 km (48 mi)
- Discharge
  - average: 265 m^{3}/s (9,400 cu ft/s)

The Braldu River (Balti: བྲཱལྡུ་ཙང་པོ།, romanized: braldu tsang po; Urdu: برالدو ندی) flows in the Shigar District of Gilgit Baltistan in Pakistan. The Braldu and Basha Basna rivers join to form the Shigar River, which is a tributary of the Indus River.

== Geography ==
The Braldu River is a 78 kilometres (48 mi) long river, that originates from the Baltoro Glacier and flows 25 kilometres (16 mi) to the west where it receives melt waters from the Biafo Glacier. The Baltoro Glacier and the Biafo Glacier are among the largest glaciers outside the polar regions. The Baltoro Glacier gives rise to the four Eight-thousanders mountain peaks, among them is the K2 28,251 ft (8,611 metres), the second highest mountain peak of the world. The Biafo Glacier holds the Snow Lake, which is a 61-mile (100 km) river of ice, it is among the world's longest continuous glacier systems outside of the polar regions.

The Braldu River flows almost eastwards, entirely in the Shigar District of Baltistan and forms the Braldu Valley. The most remote settlement in the valley is the village of Askole, situated at the right bank of the Braldu River. Askole serves as the base camp for mountaineering expeditions and trekking to the various glaciers in the Karakoram Range. Many glacier-fed streams join the Braldu River in the Braldu Valley.

The Braldu River flows through the towns of Testay, Korphe, Shamang, Sino, Maisam Abad, Niyil and Tingstun. It merges with the Basha Basna River 5 kilometres (3.1 mi) before Tingstun to form the Shigar River at the end of the Braldu Valley. The Basha Basna River originates from the Chogo Lungma and the Sokha glaciers, and flows southeastwards. The Shigar River joins the Indus River at Skardu, 48 kilometres (30 mi) downstream from the merger of the Braldu and Basha Basna rivers.

== Kayaking ==
The Braldu River is considered to be a super extreme whitewater river. It provides great scope for kayaking, which is practised during the summer from June to August. The first attempt to kayak the river was made in 1978 by a British expedition led by Mike Jones. Jones lost his life trying to rescue a teammate, for which he was awarded the Queen's Gallantry Medal (QGM).

== Image gallery ==
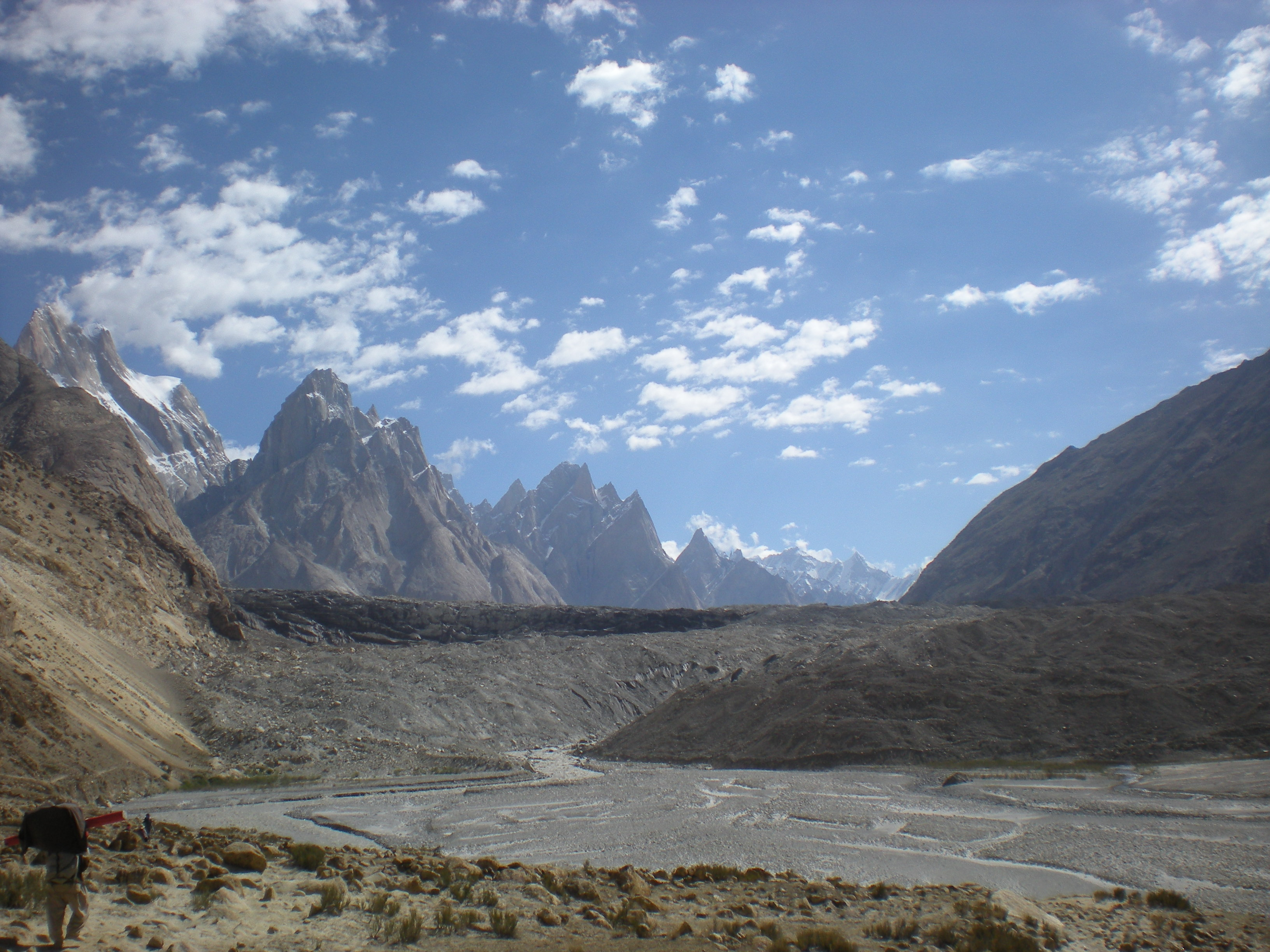
Downstream end of Baltoro Glacier, with Braldu River emerging from underneath

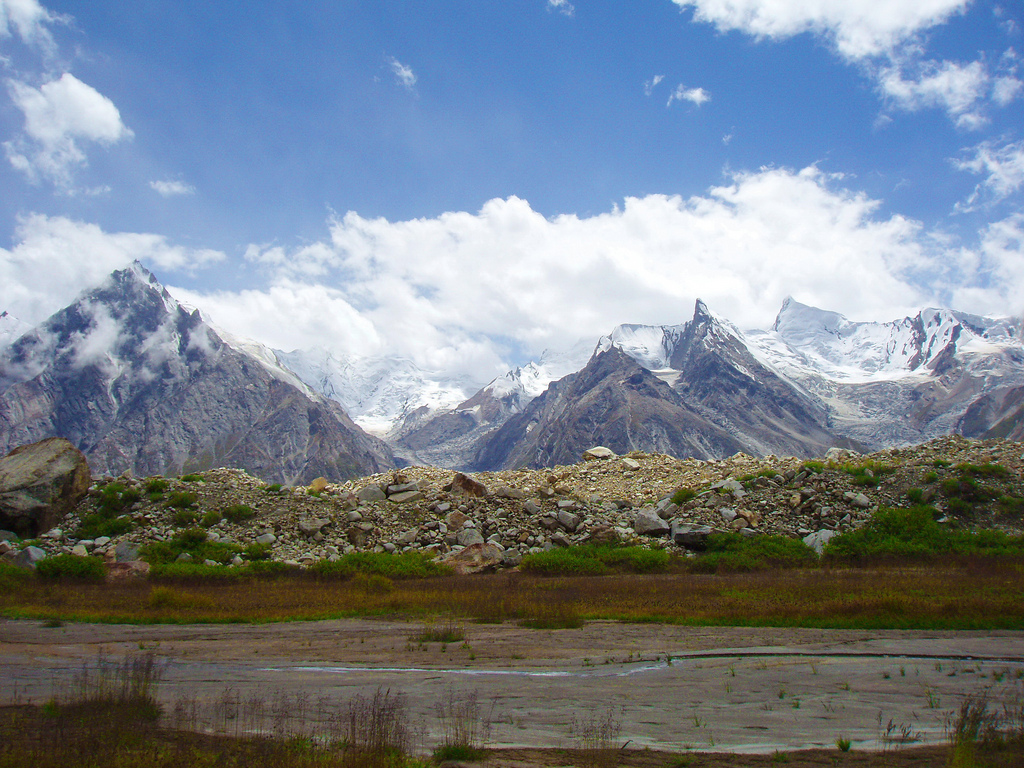
The Braldu River, with the Biafo Glacier in the background
