= Prestfelde School =

Coordinates: 52°42′06.49″N 02°43′41.87″W

Location
- London Road; Shrewsbury, Shropshire, SY2 6NZ; England

Information
- Type: Private day and boarding school Preparatory school
- Religious affiliation: Christian
- Established: 1929
- Chairman of Governors: R Sartain
- Head: Matty Thavenot
- Gender: Co-educational
- Age: 3 to 13
- Enrolment: 350
- Colours: Navy Blue, grey and yellow
- Former pupils: Old Prestfeldians
- Affiliation: Woodard Corporation
- Website: http://www.prestfelde.co.uk

Prestfelde School is an private co-educational day and boarding preparatory school, located on London Road in Shrewsbury in Shropshire, England, for children between the ages of 3 and 13. As of May 2023, there are 350 pupils on roll.

== History ==
The original school building had been a private house which was home in the 1880s of Colonel, later Major-General, the Honourable William Henry Herbert, whose son Percy, ultimately Bishop of Norwich was born there in 1885.

Since 1949, the school has formed part of the Woodard Schools group, founded by the Christian educationalist the Reverend Nathaniel Woodard and as such is affiliated to the largest group of Church of England schools in the country. Originally a school for boys, it diversified during the late 1990s and now has nearly 100 girls.

The school is set in 30 acres (120,000 m^{2}) of grounds on the outskirts of Shrewsbury, close to the Lord Hill column.

== Latest inspections ==
The latest school inspection by the Independent Schools Inspectorate was undertaken in 2023 and the school was rated as Excellent in all areas, and the latest boarding inspection by OFSTED was undertaken in November 2009.

== Notable Old Prestfeldians ==
- Flt Lt Eric Lock DSO DFC & Bar, a Battle of Britain RAF pilot and leading British ace of the Battle, born in Bayston Hill in 1919, attended Prestfelde between 1929 and 1933.
- Dave Manby - national champion slalom canoeist

== See also ==
- School website
