= Eric Lock =

British RAF fighter pilot (1919–1941)

Eric Lock DSO, DFC & Bar
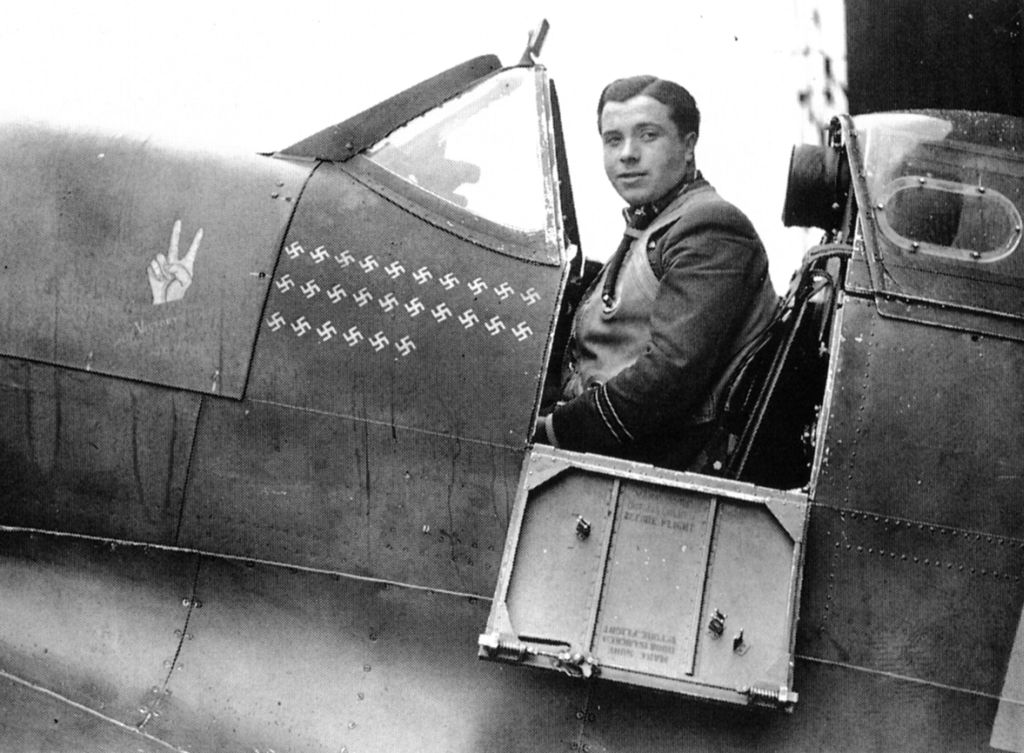
- Lock in the cockpit of his Spitfire. Just below the cockpit are 26 Swastika emblems denoting aerial victories. Lock has already recorded his final kill – on 14 July 1941. Shortly after this photo was taken, Lock disappeared.
- Born: 19 April 1919; Bayston Hill, Shrewsbury, Shropshire, England
- Died: 3 August 1941 (aged 22); English Channel, off Calais, France
- Military career
- Allegiance: United Kingdom
- Branch: Royal Air Force
- Service years: 1939–1941
- Rank: Flight Lieutenant
- Nickname: "Sawn Off"
- Units: No. 41 Squadron RAF; No. 611 Squadron RAF
- Conflicts: Second World War: European air campaign; Battle of Britain (WIA); The Hardest Day; Battle of Britain Day; Channel Front (WIA) (MIA) (PKIA)
- Awards: Distinguished Service Order; Distinguished Flying Cross & Bar

Eric Stanley Lock, DSO, DFC & Bar (19 April 1919 – 3 August 1941) was a British Royal Air Force (RAF) fighter pilot and flying ace of the Second World War.

Born in Shrewsbury, Shropshire in 1919, Lock had his first experience of flying as a teenager. In the late 1930s with war a possibility and the likely event of him being called to arms, Lock decided that he would prefer to fight as an airman. He joined the RAF in 1939. He completed his training in 1940 and was posted to No. 41 Squadron RAF in time for the Battle of Britain. Lock became the RAF's most successful Allied pilot during the battle, shooting down 21 German aircraft and sharing in the destruction of one.

After the Battle of Britain, Lock served on the Channel Front, flying offensive sweeps over France. Lock went on to bring his overall total to 26 aerial victories, one shared destroyed and eight probable in 25 weeks of operational sorties over a one-year period, during which time he was hospitalised for six months. Included in his victory total were 20 German fighter aircraft, 18 of them Messerschmitt Bf 109s. In mid-1941 Lock was promoted to the rank of flight lieutenant.

Lock earned the nickname "Sawn Off Lockie", because of his extremely short stature. Within less than six months of becoming one of the most famous RAF pilots in the country, he disappeared after strafing German troops in his Supermarine Spitfire, presumably shot down by ground-fire. Lock was posted missing in action. He was never seen again.

== Early life and career ==
Eric Stanley Lock was born in 1919 to a farming and quarrying family, whose home was in the rural Shropshire village of Bayston Hill. He was privately educated at Prestfelde School, Shrewsbury. On his 14th birthday his father treated him to a five-shilling, 15-minute flight with Sir Alan Cobham's Air Circus. Unlike most teenagers, Lock was unimpressed by flying and had soon lost interest. At 16 he left school and joined his father's business.

In 1939, he made the decision that if there was going to be a war, he wanted to be a fighter pilot, and so immediately joined the Royal Air Force Volunteer Reserve. Within three months Lock had been called up and began flight training. On the outbreak of war in September 1939, as a trained pilot Lock joined the RAF as a sergeant pilot. After further training at No.6 Flying School RAF Little Rissington, he was commissioned as a pilot officer (Service Number 81642) and posted to No. 41 Squadron at RAF Catterick, North Yorkshire, flying Spitfires.

Lock completed his training in late May 1940. Officially qualified as a fighter pilot, he was posted to No. 41 Squadron at RAF Catterick as acting pilot officer. Lock spent several weeks with his squadron before taking a two-week leave pass in July 1940 to marry his girlfriend Peggy Meyers, a former "Miss Shrewsbury". Lock returned to his unit and soon began combat patrols over the North of England, defending British airspace against Luftflotte 5 (Air Fleet 5) based in Norway. Lock was bored by the patrols as it involved chasing lone enemy raiders without success.

== Second World War ==
=== Battle of Britain ===
The Battle of Britain began in July 1940 with the Luftwaffe making attacks on British shipping in the English Channel and Britain's East Coast. In August RAF Fighter Command's bases came under attack as the Germans attempted to establish air superiority over southern England. The battles grew larger in scale, but 41 Squadron, based in the north, were well clear of the main combat zone and saw little action for the first four weeks of the German air offensive.

Lock's frustration ended on 15 August 1940. On this date the Luftwaffe attempted to stretch Fighter Command by launching a wave of aircraft against targets in northern England where German intelligence believed there to be little opposition. It was in this battle Lock gained his first victory. Climbing at 20,000 feet (6,100 m) north of Catterick Lock spotted a massed formation of Messerschmitt Bf 110s and Junkers Ju 88s. The Squadron was ordered into line-astern formation and made an attack. In the first attack Lock followed his Section Leader. In the second he had an opportunity to fire at a Bf 110 heavy fighter. After two short bursts the starboard engine caught fire. Following the enemy fighter down to 10,000 feet (3,000 m), Lock fired into the fuselage and set the port engine on fire. The machine-gunner ceased firing and Lock left it at 5,000 feet (1,500 m). Lock was going to claim only a probable, but another No. 41 pilot saw it crash into Seaham Harbour and confirmed his victory. Lock soon attacked the Ju 88s, downing one of their number.

In light of Fighter Command's need for units in the south of the country, No. 41 Squadron was redeployed to RAF Hornchurch in Essex on 3 September 1940. On 5 September, Lock flew as Red 2, positioned behind and protecting the Squadron's Leader. He shot down two Heinkel He 111s over the Thames Estuary. One of his victims crashed into a river, the other caught fire and its undercarriage fell down. Lock followed it down. He quickly realised his mistake—reducing height to pursue a damaged enemy put a pilot at risk from enemy fighters—but it was too late. A Messerschmitt Bf 109 attacked him and he sustained damage to his Spitfire and a wound to his leg. Lock immediately zoom-climbed. The Bf 109 attempted to follow but the pilot stalled and fell away. Lock reversed direction and dived. Waiting for the German fighter to come out of its dive he fired several short bursts and it exploded. Looking around he saw the second He 111 land in the English Channel, about ten miles from the first. Lock circled above the He 111 and noticing a boat he alerted the boat to its presence by flying over it and led the vessel to the crash site. As he left the scene he saw the crew surrendering to the occupants of the boat. On the way home he saw his first victim in the river, with a dinghy nearby. A further Bf 109 was claimed destroyed on that date.

The following day, despite pain from his leg and against medical advice, Lock claimed his seventh victory, a Ju 88 off Dover at 09:00. On 9 September he claimed two Bf 109s destroyed over Kent and he followed the success with two victories—over a Ju 88 and Bf 110—on 11 September 1940. The victory brought his tally to nine enemy aircraft destroyed, eight of them in less than seven days. He was awarded the Distinguished Flying Cross (DFC). The award was gazetted on 1 October 1940 with a citation reading:

Air Ministry, 1st October, 1940.

ROYAL AIR FORCE.

The KING has been graciously pleased to approve the undermentioned appointment and awards in recognition of gallantry displayed in flying operations against the enemy:–

[...]

Awarded the Distinguished Flying Cross.

[...]

Pilot Officer Eric Stanley LOCK .(81642), Royal Air Force Volunteer Reserve.

This officer has destroyed nine enemy aircraft, eight of these within a period of one week. He has displayed great vigour and determination in pressing home his attacks.

Lock continued to shoot enemy aircraft down regularly. On 14 September he recorded two victories over Bf 109s and the following day shared in the destruction of a Dornier Do 17 before destroying a Bf 109 on 15 September 1940—the Battle of Britain Day—over Clacton-on-Sea. Two rest days followed. On 18 September he claimed a Bf 109 probably destroyed on his first patrol then another destroyed plus one probably destroyed in the afternoon over Gravesend.

On 20 September, he filed a curious report that saw him attack three "Heinkel He 113s", shooting down one and forcing the others to flee back to France. During that sortie he sighted a Henschel Hs 126 which he pursued across the English Channel before finally downing it over the German gun batteries at Boulogne-sur-Mer. Upon landing he was told by his commanding officer that he had been awarded a Medal bar to his DFC for 15 victories in 16 days. Published on 22 October 1940, the citation read:

Air Ministry, 22nd October, 1940.

ROYAL AIR FORCE.

The KING has been graciously pleased to approve the following appointment and awards in recognition of gallantry displayed in flying operations against the enemy:–

[...]

Awarded a Bar to the Distinguished Flying Cross.

Pilot Officer Eric Stanley LOCK, D.F.C. (81642), Royal Air Force Volunteer Reserve.

In September, 1940, whilst engaged on a patrol over the Dover area, Pilot Officer Lock engaged three Heinkel 113's one of which he shot down into the sea. Immediately afterwards he engaged a Henschel Hs 126 and destroyed it. He has displayed great courage in the face of heavy odds, and his skill and coolness in combat have enabled him to destroy fifteen enemy aircraft within a period of nineteen days.

No. 41 Squadron's pilots were placed on four weeks' rotation rest following the intense period of operational sorties, returning to RAF Hornchurch in early October 1940. Lock immediately commenced where he had left off. On 5 October he was credited with another Bf 109 with two probables over Kent; on 9 October another Bf 109 was claimed 10 miles from Dover and a probable followed seconds later. Off Dungeness he dispatched yet another Bf 109 on 11 October then on 20 October 1940 shot down a Bf 109 directly above RAF Biggin Hill. This victory brought his total to 20, making Lock a "Quadruple Ace". On 25 October Lock destroyed a Bf 109 to bring his tally to 21 aerial victories. The Battle of Britain ended on 31 October 1940 and Lock, with 21 enemy aircraft destroyed, was the most successful Allied ace of the campaign.

=== Channel Front ===
On 8 November 1940, his Spitfire was badly damaged during a skirmish with several Bf 109s over Beachy Head in East Sussex. The Spitfire was so badly damaged that Lock crash-landed in a ploughed field, but was able to walk away. On 17 November 1940 No. 41 Squadron attacked a formation of 70 Bf 109s that were top cover for a bomber raid on London. After shooting down one Bf 109, and setting another on fire, Lock's Spitfire was hit by a volley of cannon shells, which severely injured Lock's right arm and both legs. The rounds also knocked the throttle permanently open by severing the control lever. The open throttle enabled the Spitfire to accelerate swiftly to 400 mph (640 km/h), leaving the Bf 109s in his wake, without Lock having to attempt to operate it with his injured right arm. At 20,000 feet (6,100 m) he began to descend and with little control and no means of slowing the fighter down, he could not execute a safe landing; being too badly injured to parachute to safety, Lock was in a perilous situation. After losing height to 2,000 feet (610 m), Lock switched the engine off and found a suitable crash site near RAF Martlesham Heath, Suffolk, into which he glided the stricken fighter for a "wheels down" landing.

Lying in the aircraft for some two hours, he was found by two patrolling British Army soldiers and carried two miles (3 km) on an improvised stretcher made of their Enfield rifles and Army issue winter coats—made after instruction from Lock. By this point, Lock had lost so much blood that he was unconscious, and so unable to feel the additional pain of being dropped three times, once into a dyke of water. After being transferred to the Princess Mary's Hospital at RAF Halton, he was awarded the Distinguished Service Order (DSO) on 17 December 1940. The citation read:

Air Ministry, 17th December, 1940.

ROYAL AIR FORCE.

The KING has been graciously pleased to approve the following appointment and awards in recognition of gallantry displayed in flying operations against the enemy:–

Appointed a Companion of the Distinguished Service Order.

Pilot Officer Eric Stanley Lock, D.F.C. (81642). Royal Air Force Volunteer Reserve, No. 41 Squadron.

This officer has shown exceptional keenness and courage in his attacks against the enemy. In November, 1940, whilst engaged with his squadron in attacking a superior number of enemy forces, he destroyed two Messerschmitt 109's, thus bringing his total to at least twenty-two. His magnificent fighting spirit and personal example have been in the highest traditions of the service.

Lock underwent fifteen separate operations over the following three months to remove shrapnel and other metal fragments from his wounds. For the following three months he remained at Halton recuperating from his injuries, leaving on only one occasion to travel on crutches and in full uniform to Buckingham Palace, where King George VI presented him with his DSO, DFC and Bar. He was also Mentioned in Despatches in March 1941.

=== Last battles and death ===
Lock spent several months in hospital. He stayed at the Royal Masonic Hospital with Richard Hillary, another Battle of Britain ace. They were operated on by the pioneering plastic surgeon Archibald McIndoe. While there, Hillary wrote his memoirs The Last Enemy, before his death in a flying accident on 8 January 1943. He remembered Lock having Sulfapyridine treatment and being "vociferous". The nurses wore anti-infection masks and gloves, and Eric, "with an amiable grin" would curse them for it "from dawn till dusk".

In June 1941, he received notification that he had been promoted to flying officer and was requested to report back for immediate flying duty with No. 41 Squadron. Four weeks later he was promoted again to flight lieutenant and posted to No. 611 Squadron in command of B Flight. In July 1941 he gained three victories against Bf 109s flying offensive sweeps over France—on 6 July at 15:00, on 8 July at 06:30 and 11:00 on 14 July near Le Touquet.

On 3 August 1941, Lock was returning from a fighter "Rhubarb" when he spotted a column of German troops and vehicles on a road near the Pas-de-Calais. Signalling the attack to his wingman, Lock was seen to peel off from the formation and prepare for the ground strafing attack—the last time he was seen. He is believed to have been shot down by ground-fire. Neither his body nor his Spitfire Mk V, W3257, have ever been found, despite a thorough search of the area in the years following the war by both the RAF and the Commonwealth War Graves Commission.

Lock was the first of three successful RAF aces who were shot down during this period: Douglas Bader was shot down in error and taken prisoner on 9 August 1941; Robert Stanford Tuck's Spitfire was hit by enemy ground-based flak near Boulogne-sur-Mer on 28 January 1942, and he was forced to crash land and taken prisoner. In July 1942, Paddy Finucane was lost in similar circumstances to Lock.

It has been suggested by writer Dilip Sakar that Lock was shot down by the German ace Oberleutnant Johann Schmid from Jagdgeschwader 26 near Calais since he was the only German pilot to make a claim. However, Lock was posted missing on an early morning sortie. The war diary for JG 26 shows that Schmid made his claim at 18:32 in the evening and that the location of his claim was not listed in Schmid's combat report.

=== Memorials ===
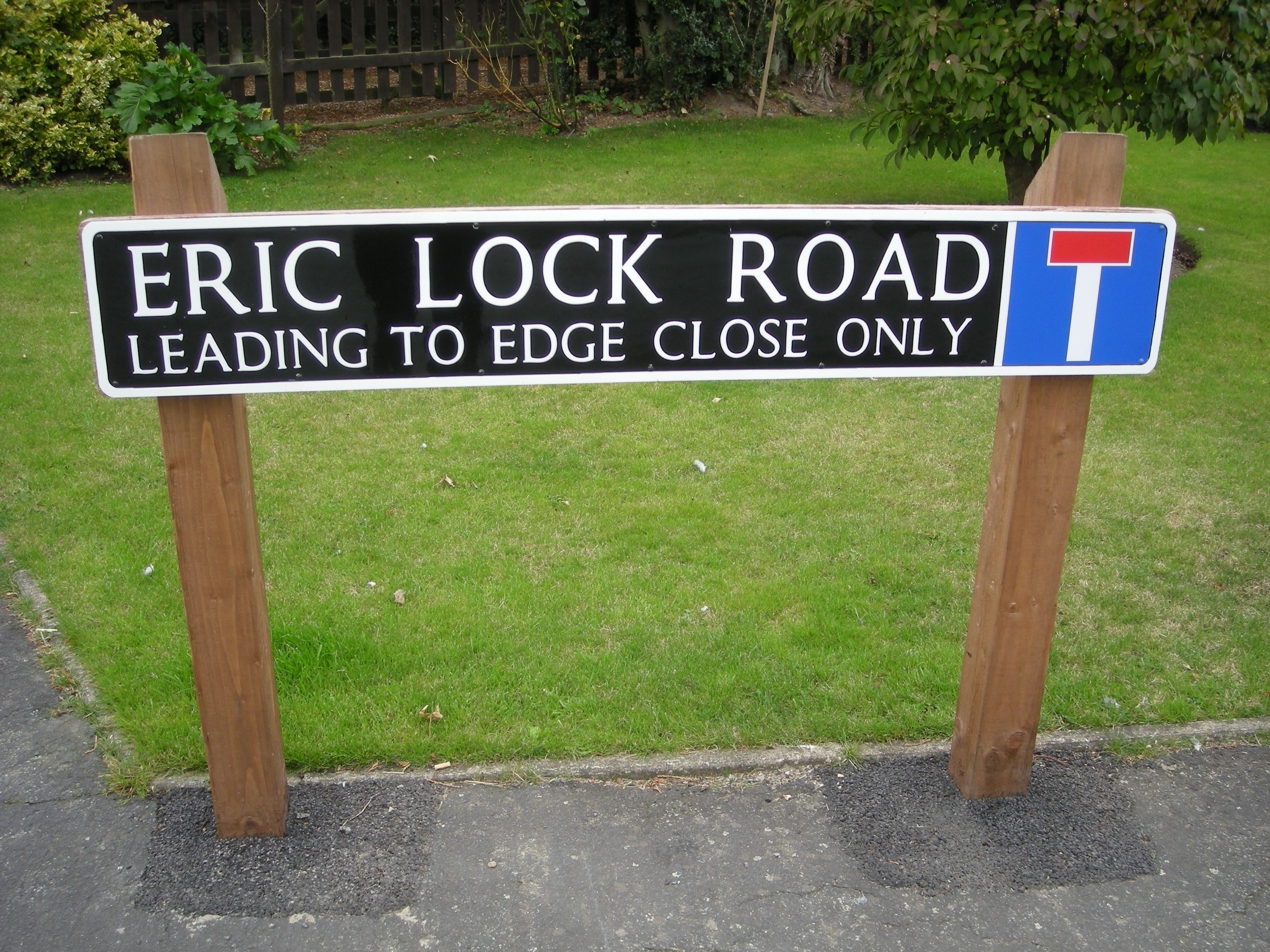
The road sign for Eric Lock Road in Bayston Hill, Shropshire

There is a stained glass memorial to Lock in Bayston Hill Memorial Hall, Shropshire (near his family's former home), a brass memorial plaque in Condover Parish Church, and another in Prestfelde School chapel, donated by the Battle of Britain Historical Society.

A new road was named after him in Bayston Hill. The members' bar at the Shropshire Aero Club, based at a former wartime airfield, RAF Sleap, is also named after him.

His name is carved on Panel 29 of the Runnymede Memorial, along with the 20,400 other British and Commonwealth airmen who were posted missing in action during the war.

Lock is named as a member of the Guinea Pig Club (made up of patients of Archibald McIndoe) on a Roll of Honour at Queen Victoria Hospital, East Grinstead, Sussex.

== List of victories ==
Lock was credited with 26 air victories and eight probable victories. The total included 17 Bf 109s, one "Heinkel He 113" (probably a Bf 109), one Henschel Hs 126, two Bf 110s, two He 111s, two Ju 88s and a Do 17 destroyed.

Chronicle of aerial victories
Claim No.	Date	Flying	Kills	Notes
1–2.	15 August 1940	Spitfire	1 x Messerschmitt Bf 110; 1 x Junkers Ju 88	Operating from RAF Catterick. Bf 110 belonged to I./Zerstörergeschwader 76 (ZG 76—Destroyer Wing 76). ZG 76 suffered heavy losses; 14 Bf 110s were shot down with 22 crew members killed and four captured. Among the victims was the Gruppenkommandeur (Group Commander) Hauptmann Restemeyer — likely lost in action against No. 72 Squadron RAF — and pilots Oberleutnant Ketling, Bremer and Leutnant Kohler and their gunners killed.
3–6.	5 September 1940	Spitfire	2 x Heinkel He 111; 2 x Messerschmitt Bf 109	Becomes fighter ace. Claimed one He 111 and one Bf 109 in the space of a minute over the Isle of Sheppey at 15:00. Other claim times not recorded. Opponents at 15:00 hours are unknown. In the morning battle, at approximately 10:00, No. 41 Squadron engaged Bf 109s from Jagdgeschwader 54 (JG 54—Fighter Wing 54) over the Thames Estuary. Two Bf 109s were shot down. A Bf 109E-4, Werknummer 5353 crashed and pilot Unteroffizier Behse was killed in action. Bf 109E-4 Werknummer 5291 also crashed. Hauptmann (Captain) Ultsch was killed. Both were from II./JG 54 (Second Gruppe or Group).
7.	6 September 1940	Spitfire	1 x Junkers Ju 88	Victim identified as Ju 88A-1, code F1 + DP, Werknummer 8070 belonging to I./Kampfgeschwader 30 (KG 30 – or Bomber Wing 30) crashed in France. Aircraft 60 per cent destroyed. Crew unhurt.
8–9.	9 September 1940	Spitfire	2 x Messerschmitt Bf 109	Claimed over Maidstone, south of London at 18:00. Identity not known. Seven Bf 109s are known to have been shot down on 9 September that cannot be matched to any specific RAF unit or pilot. Lock's possible opponents were from, Jagdgeschwader 3 (JG 3 – or Fighter Wing 3), Jagdgeschwader 27 (JG 27 – or Fighter Wing 27), Jagdgeschwader 53 (JG 53 – or Fighter Wing 53) or Jagdgeschwader 54 (JG 54 – or Fighter Wing 54). German casualties in the air battles were; Oberfeldwebel Muller of 4. Staffel (Squadron) JG 3 flying Werknummer 6138 posted missing. Feldwebel Bauer, 7 Staffel JG 3 flying Werknummer 5351, posted missing. Unteroffizier Massmann, Werknummer 6316, missing in action. Stab, I./JG 27's Oberleutnant Bode, flying Werknummer 6316 posted missing. Oberleutnant Daig II./JG 27, missing. Feldwebel Höhnisch, Werknummer 1508 missing. Feldwebel Biber, I Staffel JG 54, Werknummer 6103, missing.
10–11.	11 September 1940	Spitfire	1 x Junkers Ju 88; 1 x Messerschmitt Bf 110	Awarded DFC. Claimed both victories at 17:30 over Kent. Opponents unknown. Ju 88 claim unknown. Three Bf 110s known to have been shot down but not credited to a specific pilot. I./Zerstörergeschwader 2 (ZG 2 or Destroyer Wing 2) lost two machines. Werknummer 3376, code A2+MH, Gefreiter Kling and Sossner missing. Another Bf 110 crash-landed at St. Aubin. Werknummer 3623 50 per cent destroyed, crew unhurt. Another II./Zerstörergeschwader 76 (ZG 76 or Destroyer Wing 76) crash-landed in the sea off Étaples. Werknummer 3285, Code M8+KC lost. Crew rescued Seenotdienst (Air Sea Rescue) service.
12–13.	14 September 1940	Spitfire	2 x Bf 109	Claimed over Dungeness-Ramsgate at 19:15. Victims unknown.
14.	15 September 1940	Spitfire	1 x Bf 109; 1 x Do 17 shared	Claimed both kills at 14:30 over Shoeburyness. Identity of Bf 109 unknown. The Do 17 victory was assisted by Pilot Officer Neil but credited to Lock as one shared destroyed. One crew member was killed and one posted missing. The machine, Werknummer— (factory number) —3401 from III./Kampfgeschwader 2 (KG 2—Bomber Wing 2), crashed into the sea off Clacton at 15:30. German air-sea-rescue service, the Seenotdienst, rescued the remainder.
15.	18 September 1940	Spitfire	1 x Bf 109	Claimed a Bf 109 probably destroyed over Kent at 10:10 and another destroyed at 13:15 over Gravesend. Lock's opponents in the afternoon air battle were 9 Staffel JG 27. The unit suffered two known losses in combat with 41 Squadron Spitfires. During the air battle Werknummer 2674 crashed at approximately 13:15. Gefreiter Glöckner was posted missing. Werknummer 6327 crashed in the same area. The pilot,Feldwebel Schulz, was killed.
16–17.	20 September 1940	Spitfire	1 x "He 113" [sic], 1 x Hs 126	Awarded Bar to DFC. Claimed one He 113 and one Hs 126 northwest of Boulogne, France at 11:15. Lock most likely misidentified the "He 113" as a Bf 109. A Bf 109E-1, Werknummer 5175, force-landed after combat near Boulogne. The machine, belonging to 7 Staffel JG 53, was slightly damaged and the pilot unhurt. The identity of the Hs 126 is unknown.
18.	5 October 1940	Spitfire	1 x Bf 109	Claimed two Bf 109s at 14:30 over the English Channel and another Bf 109 probably destroyed south of Dungeness at 16:00. One of the 14:30 claims can be identified as Feldwebel von Bittenfeld. After being shot down by Lock, Bittenfeld crashed near Canterbury at 14:27. Bittenfeld was posted missing in action.
19.	9 October 1940	Spitfire	1 x Bf 109	Claimed two probable victories and one destroyed off Dover at 16:00. Victim identified as Feldwebel Fritz Schweser. Schweser's Werknummer 5327, White 6 of 7 Staffel JG 54, crashed near Rochester. Schweser posted missing in action. Schweser crash-landed on Meridan Hunt Farm and was captured.
20.	11 October 1940	Spitfire	1 x Bf 109	Victim identified as Bf 109E-1 Werknummer 6267 belonging to 5 Staffel JG 27 crashed near Deal. The pilot was wounded and taken prisoner.
21.	20 October 1940	Spitfire	1 x Bf 109	Victim identified as Feldwebel Ludwig Bielmaier of 5 Staffel Jagdgeschwader 52 (JG 52 – or Fighter Wing 52). His Bf 109E-7 Werknummer 5930 Black 4 crashed near RAF Biggin Hill at 13:50. Bielmaier posted missing.
22–23.	17 November 1940	Spitfire	2 x Bf 109	Awarded DSO. Lock wounded in action in P7544. Lock's opponents were from 5 Staffel JG 54. No. 41 Squadron claimed five Bf 109s, but only two losses are recorded.
24.	6 July 1941	Spitfire MkV	1 x Messerschmitt Bf 109	
25.	8 July 1941	Spitfire MkV	1 x Messerschmitt Bf 109	
26.	14 July 1941	Spitfire MkV	1 x Messerschmitt Bf 109	
TOTALS			26 kills	8 probable
