= Lupghar Sar =

Mountain in Karakoram, Pakistan

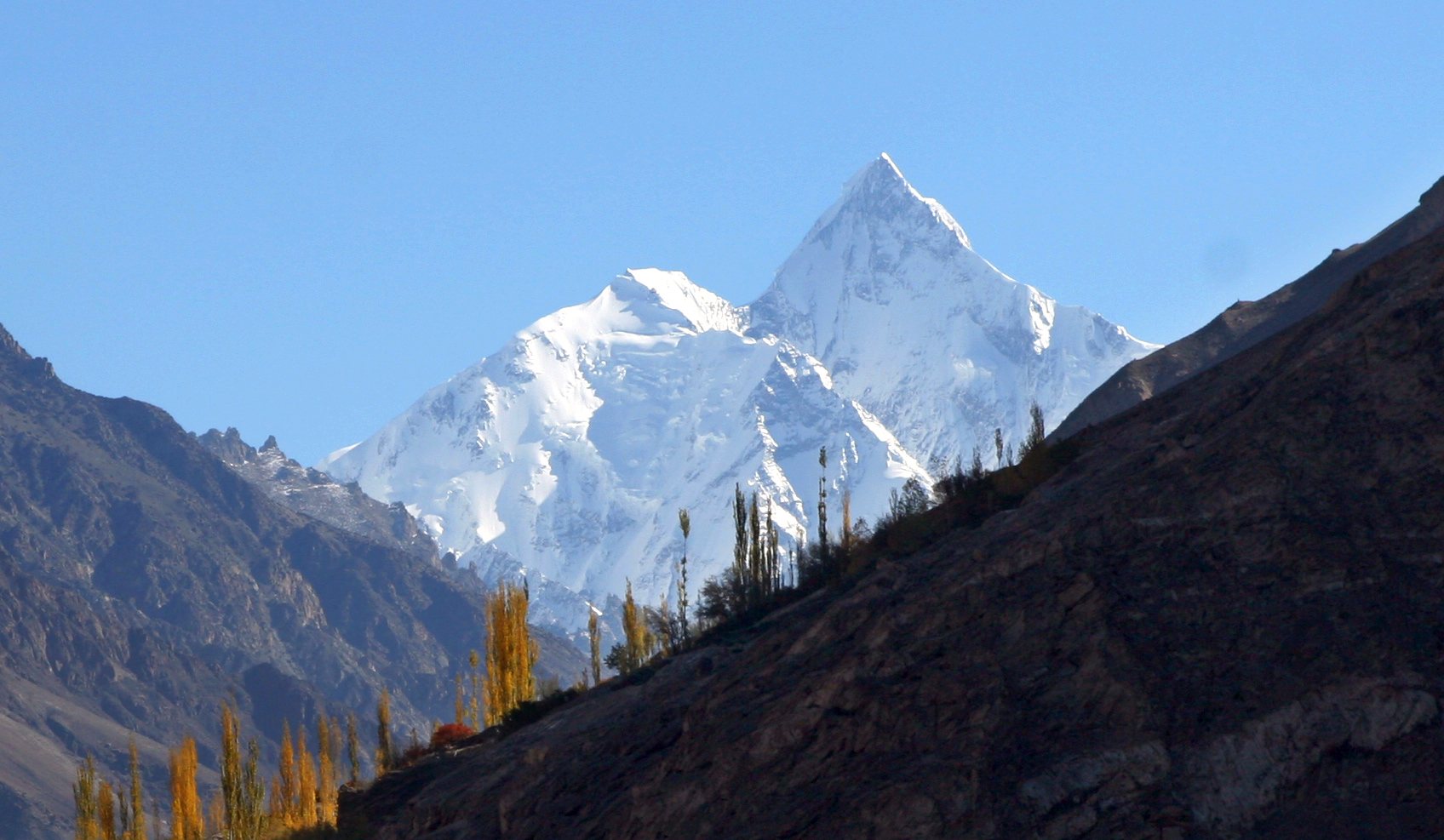
- Lupghar Sar from the Hunza Valley

Highest point
- Elevation: 7,200 m (23,600 ft); Ranked 108th
- Prominence: 730 m (2,400 ft)
- Listing: Mountains of Pakistan
- Coordinates: 36°20′54″N 75°01′33″E

Geography
- Location within India
- Location: Shimshal Gilgit-Baltistan, Pakistan
- Parent range: Hispar Muztagh, Karakoram

Climbing
- First ascent: West:1979 by Hans and Sepp Gloggner
- Easiest route: glacier/snow/ice climb

Lupghar Sar is a mountain located in Shimshal Valley of Gojal, Hunza, in northern Pakistan. It is the 108th highest mountain in the world. It is a part of the Momhil Sar cluster of mountains and has an elevation of 7,200 metres (23,622 ft) above sea level.

== Climbing history ==
- First Ascent: In 1979, the German brothers Hans and Sepp Gloggner reached the summit of Lupghar Sar West.
- First Solo Ascent: On 7 July 2018, Austrian alpinist Hansjörg Auer reached the summit of Lupghar Sar West following a line on the left side of the West Face to reach the steep North West Ridge in a solo alpine style climb, for which he won the 2019 Piolets d'Or.
