= Mike Jones (canoeist) =

Mike Jones QGM
Personal information
- Nationality: British
- Born: 1952 Yorkshire, England
- Died: 1978 (aged 25–26) Karakoram

Sport
- Sport: Canoeing

Mike Jones QGM was a 20th-century canoeist, best known for his expeditions on the Blue Nile and Dudh Kosi.

== Early life ==
Jones was born in the early 1950s in Yorkshire, England. He attended Keighley Secondary Technical School, and then Keighley Boy's Grammar School. Jones began kayaking in November 1965 at age 14, around the same time as his sister, Christine, who is the mother of Olympic canoeist Tim Baillie. He described his first time on the water as an "exhilarating and exciting day, despite the fact that I spent more time capsizing and swimming than canoeing." That winter he learned to roll. In the following years he paddled local rivers such as the Wharfe, Swale, Ure, Nidd and Lune.

== Early expeditions ==
He took up slalom canoeing and took part in his first expedition in 1969. It was led by 19-year-old Jeff Slater, whilst Slater was waiting to go to Cambridge University. The group paddled the River Inn. Jones was seventeen at the time and worked "feverishly" over a five-week holiday to raise his contribution to the expedition's funds. They arrived at St. Moritz in July after a warm up in Germany and Austria, described as a "baptism of fire". On arrival at the Inn, he soon realised why it had earned the title of the hardest stretch of water in Europe – it was in a steep gorge and from 1,000 feet (300 m) above the rapids still appeared huge. The descent lasted five days, badly damaged eight kayaks, and nearly killed one team member.

In autumn 1971, Jones was an undergraduate studying medicine at Birmingham University. His life as a student appears to have consisted of juggling his studies and his canoeing. He would often miss Friday evening lectures to attend canoeing events countrywide: "The dedicated grind of medical study did not inspire me the way that countrywide canoeing competitions did."

== Blue Nile and Dudh Kosi ==
During the winter and spring of 1971/72 he planned two more trips, and in June 1972 he was appointed team manager of the British Universities Slalom and Whitewater Team, competing "with considerable success" in three international events in Europe in the summer of 1972. Within hours of completing his pre-clinical exams, he set off for Austria without even knowing the results. Jones's subsequent expeditions included the Blue Nile, where local bandits were as much of a threat as the river. Mike Jones turned 21 on this expedition, huddled inside a wet sleeping bag and sleeping with a .45 Colt revolver in his hand.

On his return from the Blue Nile, Jones wanted to make the first descent of the Dudh Kosi. This river, whose source lies in the Mount Everest region, falls at approximately 280 feet per mile (53 m/km). By comparison, the man-made 1972 Olympic slalom course at Augsburg in Germany falls at 50 feet per mile (9.5 m/km). The launch off was at a record 17,500 feet (5,300 m) above sea level and runs for 80 miles (130 km). The team consisted of Mike Jones, Mick Hopkinson (part of the Blue Nile team), John Liddell, Rob Hastings, Roger Huyton, Dave Manby and John Gosling, the quartermaster. The expedition suffered many problems with finance and sponsorship, and several people declined any involvement as they felt the risk of dying was too great. A film – Dudh Kosi – Relentless River of Everest – recorded the expedition, and it won 12 international awards in 1976. The expedition was also followed by the Observer colour magazine and featured on HTV Cardiff. The canoes used for the descent were specially designed by Graham Mackereth of Pyranha Canoes, and needed to withstand the constant punishment from river and rocks alike.

Jones wrote a book entitled Canoeing Down Everest.

== Death ==
Jones died in 1978 on the Braldu River which flows off K2, the world's second highest mountain, in Pakistan. All of the team from the Everest team were on the expedition plus Peter Midwood. He died whilst trying to save a companion, for which he was awarded the Queen's Gallantry Medal (QGM).

A memorial message inscribed upon a wooden paddle was affixed to a tree nearest the spot where Jones was said to have died. In 1983, one of his colleagues went back to the site but both the tree and the memorial had been removed.

After his death his parents set up a memorial fund in his name. For ten years Dave Manby organised and ran the Mike Jones Rally in Llangollen North Wales to raise money for this fund. The purpose of the fund is to promote kayaking and exploration. It is now administered by the Winston Churchill Memorial Trusts. It gives grants for travel expenses for many categories; not just adventure and exploration. It is open to anyone with a British passport.
