= Bularung Sar =

Mountain in Pakistan

- بلارنگ سر
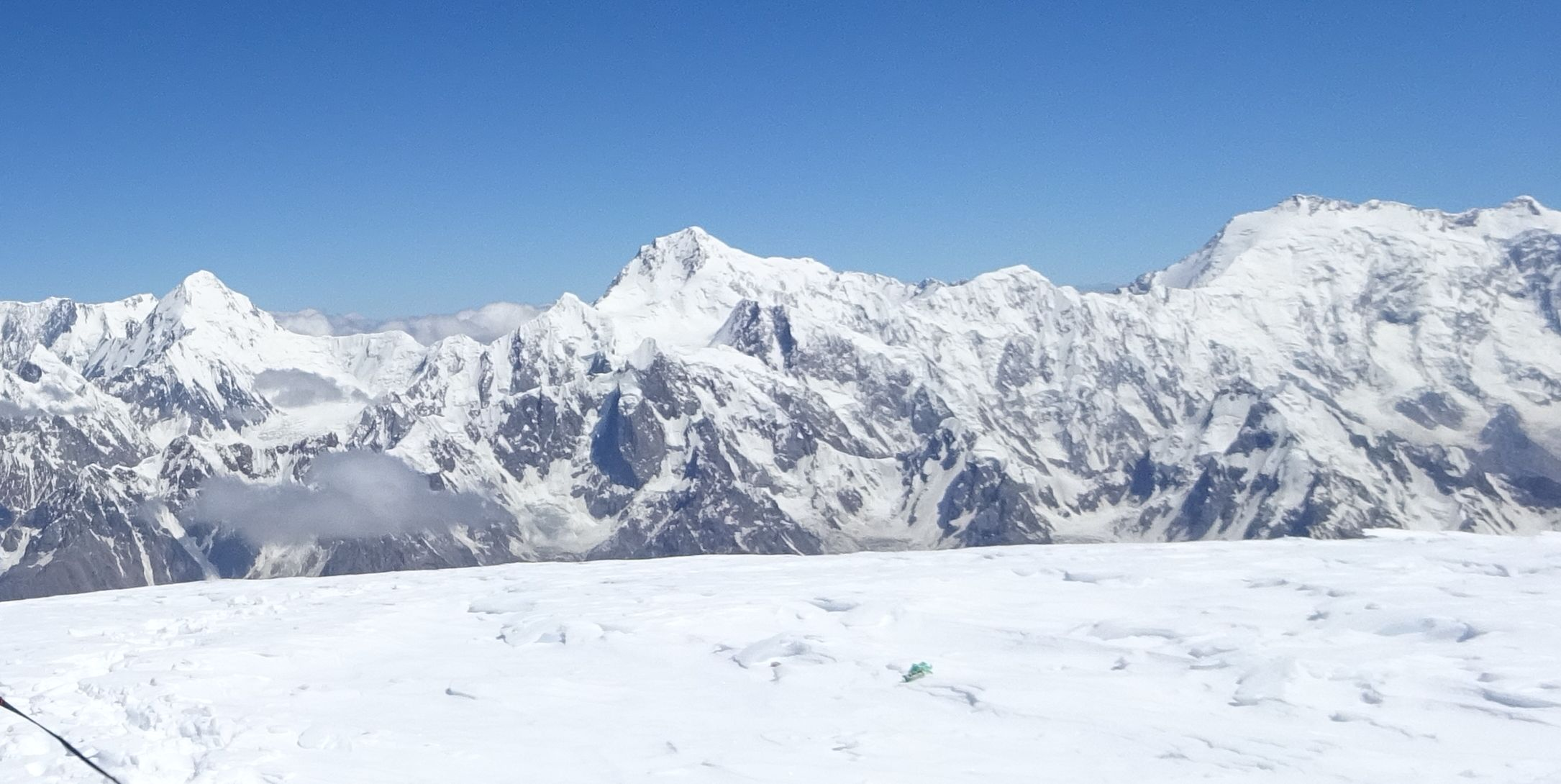

Highest point
- Elevation: 7,200 m (23,600 ft)
- Prominence: 514 m (1,686 ft)
- Listing: Ultra
- Coordinates: 36°18′07″N 75°08′06″E

Geography
- Location within Pakistan Location within Gilgit Baltistan
- Location: Shimshal Valley Gilgit-Baltistan, Pakistan
- Parent range: Hispar Muztagh, Karakoram

Climbing
- First ascent: 25/27/28 July 1995 by Swiss Alpine Club Neuchâtel team
- Easiest route: glacier/snow/ice climb

The Bularung Sar (Urdu: بلرنگ سر) is a 7,200-metre (23,622 ft) mountain in the Karakoram mountains range, Gilgit-Baltistan, northern Pakistan. It belongs to the range, called Hispar Muztagh, and is located between two other important peaks, Distaghil Sar and Trivor. On the northern flank flows Momhil glacier, on the southern slope runs Kunyang glacier..

The first ascent took place in July 1990 by a Swiss expedition on the south ridge. were members of the expedition: Alain Vaucher, Heinz Hügli, Lothar Matter, Carole Milz, Thierry Bionda, Christian Meillard, Gérard Vouga, Vincent von Kaenel, Jean-Jacques Sauvain and Jacques Aymon.
