= Johann Schmid =

German World War II flying ace

- Born: 13 January 1911; Gainfarn, Baden bei Wien, Austria-Hungary
- Died: 6 November 1941 (aged 30); English Channel
- Cause of death: Killed in action
- Military career
- Allegiance: First Austrian Republic; Federal State of Austria; Nazi Germany
- Branch: Austrian Air Force; Luftwaffe
- Service years: 1933–1941
- Rank: Major (Wehrmacht)
- Units: JG 2, JG 26
- Commands: 8./JG 26
- Conflicts: Spanish Civil War; World War II; Battle of France; Battle of Britain; Western Front †
- Awards: Knight's Cross of the Iron Cross

Johann Schmid (13 January 1911 – 6 November 1941) was an Austrian-born Luftwaffe military aviator during the World War II, a fighter ace listed with 45 enemy aircraft shot down. A flying ace or fighter ace is a military aviator credited with shooting down five or more enemy aircraft during aerial combat. All of his aerial victories were claimed over Western Front of World War II.

Born in Gainfarn, Schmid joined the Austrian Air Force in 1933 and subsequently transferred to the Luftwaffe following the Anschluss in 1938. He then served with "Condor Legion" in the latter stages of the Spanish Civil War. Following his return, he was posted Jagdgeschwader 2 "Richthofen" (JG 2—2nd Fighter Wing). Flying with this unit, Schmid claimed his first aerial victory on 14 May 1940 during the Battle of France. Later that year, he served as an instructor and was then posted to Jagdgeschwader 26 "Schlageter" (JG 26—26th Fighter Wing) in July 1940. Following his 24th aerial victory claimed, Schmid was awarded the Knight's Cross of the Iron Cross on 21 August 1941 and appointed Staffelkapitän (squadron leader) of 8. Staffel of JG 26. He was killed in action on 6 November 1941 when he was shot down over the English Channel. Posthumously, he was promoted to Major (major).

== Career ==
Schmid was born on 13 January 1911 in Gainfarn, in the Baden bei Wien region of Austria. He joined the Austrian Air Force in 1933. After the Anschluss, the annexation of the Federal State of Austria into Nazi Germany, in 1938 he was drafted into the Luftwaffe as an Oberfeldwebel and flew with the "Condor Legion" in the latter stages of the Spanish Civil War. Upon his return, he was transferred to the 1. Staffel (1st squadron) of Jagdgeschwader 2 "Richthofen" (JG 2—2nd Fighter Wing), a squadron of I. Gruppe (1st group).

=== Battle of France and Britain ===
At the start of the Battle of France, I. Gruppe of JG 2 supported Army Group A in its advance through the Ardennes towards the Meuse river. On 14 May, the Gruppe moved to an airfield near Bastogne. That day, Schmid claimed his first aerial victory when he shot down a Morane-Saulnier M.S.406 fighter. On 18 May, Schmid claimed a Westland Lysander army cooperation aircraft shot down near Beauvais. Following the German advance northwest, the Gruppe moved to an airfield at Beaulieu that day. The next day, he was credited with the destruction of a Hawker Hurricane fighter near Cambrai. On 20 May, I. Gruppe was relocated to Signy-le-Petit where they were deployed on the northern front of Army Group A. That evening, Schmid shot down a Curtiss P-36 Hawk fighter near Péronne.

On 20 September 1940, Schmid claimed his ninth aerial victory, a Spitfire fighter shot down south of London. He was then transferred and served as an instructor.

=== With Jagdgeschwader 26 ===
Following his assignment as an instructor, Schmid joined Jagdgeschwader 26 "Schlageter" (JG 26—26th Fighter Wing) on 10 July 1941. There, he was assigned to the Geschwaderstab (headquarters unit) by Oberstleutnant Adolf Galland, the Geschwaderkommodore (wing commander). JG 26 was named after Albert Leo Schlageter, a martyr cultivated by the Nazi Party. At the time, the Geschwaderstab was based at Audembert near the English Channel. Schmid claimed his first aerial victory with JG 26 on 22 July. That day, Royal Air Force (RAF) Fighter Command attacked the Saint-Omer airfield with Supermarine Spitfire fighters from No. 308 Polish Fighter Squadron. The following day, the RAF flew an evening "Circus" mission with six Bristol Blenheim bombers to Mazingarbe escorted by Spitfire fighters. The Geschwaderstab, led by Galland, intercepted the escorting fighters and Schmid claimed a Spitfire shot down.

On 3 August, the RAF flew a series of anti shipping attacks. Defending against these attacks, Schmid claimed a Spitfire destroyed. Sarkar suggested that his opponent may have been RAF pilot Flight Lieutenant Eric Lock from No. 611 Squadron. Lock, flying Spitfire Mk V W3257, was reported by his own side as shot down by anti-aircraft fire on 3 August 1941 near Boulogne, but whose crash site was not ascertained. Sarkar, who cross referenced Lock's disappearance with Luftwaffe combat claims for the same day, discovered that while Lock's Spitfire was the only RAF plane lost that day, Schmid reported having shot down a Spitfire into the sea near Calais. In reality, Lock was lost in the morning of the 3 August. Schmid claimed his victory in the early evening at 18:32.

Schmid claimed three Spitfire fighters shot down on 7 August likely from No. 12 Group's Digby Wing. That day, the RAF flew "Circus" No. 67 targeting Saint-Omer airfield with six Blenheim bombers escorted by twelve fighter squadrons. Before noon on 9 August, Schmid and his wingman Unteroffizier Heinz Richter, claimed two Spitfires from the Royal Australian Air Force (RAAF) No. 452 Squadron. Later that day, Schmid claimed two further Spitfires shot down defending against a "Rodeo" attack by No. 11 Group. The following day, a German freighter came under attack from three Blenheim bombers which took off from RAF Manston at 12:50. The Geschwaderstab intercepted the RAF bombers and escort fighters north of Gravelines. In the resulting aerial combat, Schmid claimed two Hurricane fighters from No. 242 Squadron and a Spitfire, the Spitfire managed to return. On 12 August, Schmid shot down a Spitfire fighter from either No. 19 or No. 152 Squadron. That day, Bomber Command attacked Cologne, supported by a number of diversionary missions.

On 19 August, the RAF flew "Circus" No. 81, the mission which also dropped a spare set of artificial legs for Wing Commander Douglas Bader at Saint-Omer airfield. The primary target of the operation was Béthune. Defending against this attack, Schmid claimed a Blenheim bomber which was shot down northwest of Dunkirk and belonged to No. 18 Squadron. That evening, the RAF flew "Circus" No. 82 to Hazebrouck and Schmid shot down a Spitfire fighter belonging to No. 222 Squadron from this attack force, taking his total to 24 aerial victory claims. For this, he was decorated with the Knight's Cross of the Iron Cross (Ritterkreuz des Eisernen Kreuzes) on 21 August 1941 and promoted to Hauptmann (captain).

=== Squadron leader and death ===
Along with his promotion, Schmid was appointed Staffelkapitän (squadron leader) of 8. Staffel of JG 26, replacing Oberleutnant Hans-Jürgen Westphal who had been injured. 8. Staffel was subordinated to III. Gruppe and at the time commanded by Hauptmann Gerhard Schöpfel and based at Ligescourt. On 4 September, he claimed three Spitfires shot down. In total, he was credited with eleven aerial victories in September, with the exception of a Blenheim bomber shot down on 27 September, all of which were Spitfire fighters.

On 6 November 1941, he led the whole III. Gruppe into combat against a dozen Spitfires. In this encounter, he claimed a Spitfire shot down. His opponent may have been Sergeant B.M. Geissman of No. 452 Squadron RAAF. Schmid was circling low over the crash site when the wing of his Messerschmitt Bf 109 F-4 (Werknummer 7211—factory number) hit the water in a position 10 kilometers (6.2 miles) northwest of Calais. The aircraft immediately disintegrated and sank, taking Schmid with it. Following his death, he was replaced by Oberleutnant Karl Borris as commander of 8. Staffel. Posthumously, he was promoted to Major (major).

== Summary of career ==
=== Aerial victory claims ===
According to Obermaier, Schmid was credited with 45 victories in 137 missions, all over the Western Front. Spick lists him with 41 aerial victories and a mission-to-claim ratio of 3.34. Mathews and Foreman, authors of Luftwaffe Aces: Biographies and Victory Claims, researched the German Federal Archives and found records for 40 aerial victory claims, plus five further unconfirmed claims, all of which were claimed on the Western Front.

Chronicle of aerial victories
This and the – (dash) indicates unconfirmed aerial victory claims for which Schmid did not receive credit. This and the ? (question mark) indicates information discrepancies listed by Caldwell, Prien, Stemmer, Rodeike, Bock, Mathews and Foreman.
Claim	Date	Time	Type	Location	Claim	Date	Time	Type	Location
– 1. Staffel of Jagdgeschwader 2 "Richthofen" – Battle of France — 10 May – 25 June 1940
1	14 May 1940	10:10	M.S.406	Frésnois; Frésnois 15 km (9.3 mi) north-northeast of Montmédy	5	26 May 1940	17:03	Spitfire	southwest of Calais
2	18 May 1940	07:15	Lysander	Beauvais	6	30 May 1940	18:05	Potez 63	Ducy
3	19 May 1940	12:57	Hurricane	Cambrai	7	5 June 1940	13:10	MB.150	Connantre
4	20 May 1940	18:35	Hawk 75	Péronne					
– 1. Staffel of Jagdgeschwader 2 "Richthofen" – Action at the Channel and over England — 26 June – September 1940
8	28 July 1940	10:35	Blenheim	40 km (25 mi) northwest of Le Havre	9	20 September 1940	12:10	Spitfire	south of London
– Stab of Jagdgeschwader 26 "Schlageter" – Action on the Western Front — 10 July – 20 August 1941
10	22 July 1941	19:00	Spitfire		18	9 August 1941	17:45	Spitfire	Gravelines
11	23 July 1941	20:15	Spitfire	Bruges	19	10 August 1941	13:00	Hurricane	north of Gravelines
12	3 August 1941	18:32	Spitfire		20	10 August 1941	13:01	Hurricane	north of Gravelines
13? (Note: According to Mathews and Foreman, this claim is unconfirmed.)	7 August 1941	11:20	Spitfire	Campagne	21?	10 August 1941	13:03	Spitfire	north of Gravelines
14	7 August 1941	11:30	Spitfire	southeast of Calais southwest of Calais	22?	12 August 1941	13:22	Spitfire	northwest of Vlissingen
15	7 August 1941	17:43	Spitfire	north of Ardres; Saint-Omer-Ardes	23?	19 August 1941	12:25	Blenheim	northwest of Dunkirk
16	9 August 1941	11:25	Spitfire	10 km (6.2 mi) east of Saint-Omer	24	19 August 1941	19:55	Spitfire	west of Rubrouck east of Saint-Omer
17	9 August 1941	17:44	Spitfire	Gravelines					
– 8. Staffel of Jagdgeschwader 26 "Schlageter" – Action on the Western Front — 21 August – 6 November 1941
25	26 August 1941	19:40	Blenheim		36	27 September 1941	15:35	Spitfire	
26	27 August 1941	08:30	Spitfire	25 km (16 mi) north of Calais	37	27 September 1941	15:50	Blenheim	
27	4 September 1941	17:20	Spitfire		38	1 October 1941	17:37	Spitfire	Dover
28	4 September 1941	17:35	Spitfire		39	2 October 1941	18:42	Spitfire	Pas-de-Calais
29	4 September 1941	17:50	Spitfire		40	3 October 1941	15:52	Spitfire	20 km (12 mi) north of Ostend
30	7 September 1941	17:20	Spitfire		— ? (Note: According to Mathews and Foreman, this claim is confirmed.)	13 October 1941	14:35	Spitfire	Boulogne
31	18 September 1941	16:00	Spitfire		— ? (Note: This unconfirmed claim is not listed by Prien, Stemmer, Rodeike and Bock.)	13 October 1941	—	Spitfire	Boulogne
32	20 September 1941	16:45	Spitfire		— ?	21 October 1941	13:00	Spitfire	
33	21 September 1941	16:10	Spitfire		—	27 October 1941	15:05	Spitfire	Calais
34	21 September 1941	16:15	Spitfire		— ?	6 November 1941	15:48	Spitfire	10 km (6.2 mi) north of Calais
35	27 September 1941	15:23	Spitfire						

=== Awards ===
- Iron Cross (1939) 2nd and 1st Class
- Knight's Cross of the Iron Cross on 21 August 1941 as Hauptmann and Staffelkapitän of the 8./Jagdgeschwader 26 "Schlageter" (Note: According to Scherzer as pilot in the Stab/Jagdgeschwader 26 "Schlageter".)

== Notes ==
Military offices
Preceded by Oberleutnant Hans-Jürgen Wastphal	Squadron Leader of 8. Staffel of Jagdgeschwader 26; 22 August 1941 – 6 November 1941	Succeeded by Oberleutnant Karl Borris
