= Hansjörg Auer =

Austrian mountaineer (1984–2019)

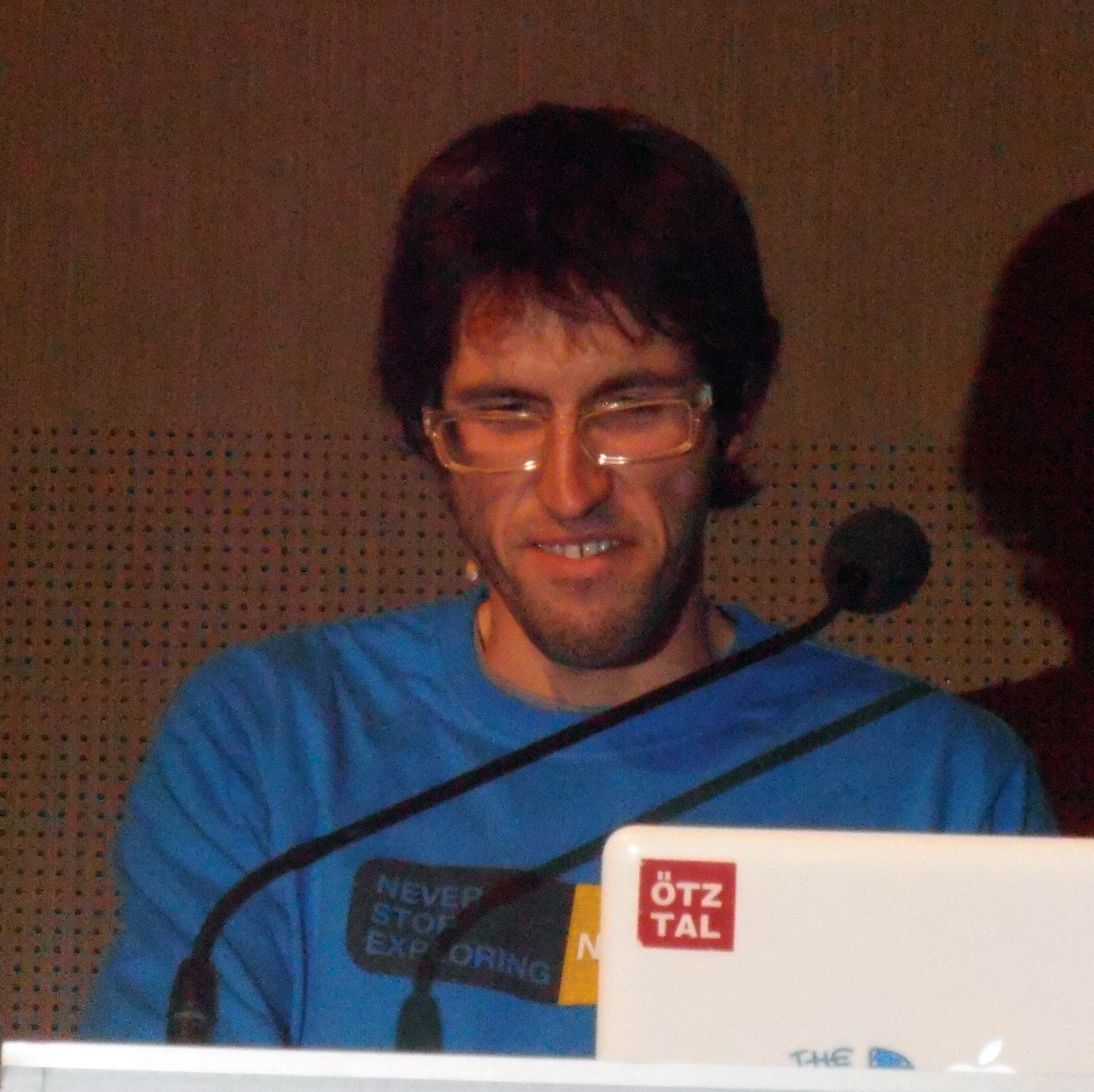
- Auer in Innsbruck, November 2012

Personal information
- Nationality: Austrian
- Born: 18 February 1984 Zams, Tyrol, Austria
- Died: 16 April 2019 (aged 35) Howse Peak, Alberta, Canada

Climbing career
- Type of climber: Sport climbing, bouldering, mountaineering
- Major ascents: Marmolada, Dolomites, Italy (2007)

Hansjörg Auer ([hans.jœʁk ˈaʊ̯ɐ]; 18 February 1984 – 16 April 2019) was an Austrian mountaineer, noted for his free solo climbs, and particularly of Fish Route in the Italian Dolomites, the first-ever big wall solo at 5.12c (7b+). National Geographic described him as "one of the boldest and best climbers in the world", and he won the 2019 Piolet d'Or for this free solo ascent of the Lupghar Sar West, in northern Pakistan. He died in an avalanche while climbing on Howse Peak in the Canadian Rockies.

== Personal life ==
Auer was born in Zams, Tyrol, on 18 February 1984, and lived in the Ötztal area of Tyrol. In 2017, he published an autobiography entitled Südwand, in which he describes his problems with anorexia. He considered the South Tyrolean alpinist Reinhold Messner to be a role model.

== Career ==
Auer's first major free solo climb was Tempi Moderni ("Modern Times"), an 850-metre (2,800-foot) route of 27 pitches graded 5.11d (7a), on the south face of Marmolada in the Dolomites in northeastern Italy, which he climbed in 2006. The climb took 2 hours 40 minutes.

He is perhaps best known for his 2007 free solo climb of the Via Attraverso il Pesce, commonly known as Fish Route, also on Marmolada's south face. The 37-pitch (850 metres, 2,800 feet) route, named for a fish-shaped niche in the 20th pitch, is highly committing, and is graded 5.12c (7b+). There are eight particularly hard pitches bracketing the niche, including some overhanging sections. The route was first free climbed by the Czech Jindrich Sustr and the Slovak Igor Koller in 1981, using ropes in a traditional climbing manner. It was rope soloed by the Italian climber Maurizio Giordani in 1990; Giordani used a rope to belay himself on some of the pitches and took 10 hours. Auer had failed to redpoint the climb with a partner in 2004. He started his 2007 attempt on 28 April by practicing sections, after abseiling in from the top of the wall. He then fully free-soloed the route on 29 April (i.e. without using any rope), in 2 hours 55 minutes. Auer's free climb has been compared with the 2017 free solo climb of El Capitan in the Yosemite National Park by Alex Honnold. Alpinist magazine described it in 2007 as "one of the most difficult, long free solos ever tackled", commenting that it could be described as a "speed ascent". This route was also climbed by Adam Ondra in 2026.

He subsequently focused on mountains of over 7,000 metres (23,000 feet) in the Himalaya and the Karakoram ranges, and was known for making several first ascents. These included the south face of Nilgiri South in the Annapurna Massif, Nepal, the west wall of Lupghar Sar, and the south-west face of Kunyang Chhish East in the Karakorum Mountains, Pakistan. His first ascent of Lupghar Sar West was climbed solo. He was posthumously honoured with a Piolet d'Or in 2019 for this achievement.

== Death ==
Auer and fellow climbers Austrian David Lama and American Jess Roskelley died on the descent after reaching the summit of Howse Peak in Banff National Park of the Canadian Rockies on 16 April 2019. The group completed a difficult variation of a route on the east face of Howse Peak known as M-16. The Auer-Lama-Roskelley variation took a line to the left of M-16, after the first difficult waterfall pitch on that route. Their bodies were found on 21 April 2019.

Photographic and GPS evidence recovered from the accident site and from Jess Roskelley's iPhone show they left their camp at the base of the east face at approximately 05:30 AM, climbed the first difficult ice pitch on M-16 by 07:19 AM, and then traversed left on new terrain into a left-leaning ramp. After a pitch and a half up the ramp, they traversed left again and climbed an exceptionally difficult unclimbed waterfall, which brought them to a long, steep snow gully. They climbed the gully and then traversed over a snow rib further left into the large snow basin that is drained by the icefall route, "Life by the Drop". They climbed up the snow basin to the south ridge, which they ascended to the summit. Their summit photos were taken at 12:41 PM and 12:44 PM. The last photo on Auer's camera places them rappelling into the top of the snow basin at 1:27 PM. It can be deduced from a photograph taken from the highway by a local climber from Canmore that a large cornice broke off above the snow basin and swept the route above "Life by the Drop" at 1:58, 31 minutes after they dropped into the basin to descend their route. Their bodies were recovered from an avalanche cone below "Life by the Drop" on 21 April 2019. The shallow layer of snow covering the bodies is a further indicator of a cornice break as the cause of the accident.

== See also ==
- History of rock climbing
- List of Austrian mountain climbers
- List of first ascents (sport climbing)
