= Kunyang Chhish =

Mountain in Pakistan

- Location within Pakistan Location within Gilgit Baltistan
- The major peaks in Karakoram are rank identified by height. Legend: 1：K2; 2：Gasherbrum I, K5; 3：Broad Peak; 4：Gasherbrum II, K4; 5：Gasherbrum III, K3a; 6：Gasherbrum IV, K3; 7：Distaghil Sar; 8：Kunyang Chhish; 9：Masherbrum, K1; 10：Batura Sar, Batura I; 11：Rakaposhi; 12：Batura II; 13：Kanjut Sar; 14：Saltoro Kangri, K10; 15：Batura III; 16： Saser Kangri I, K22; 17：Chogolisa; 18：Shispare; 19：Trivor Sar; 20：Skyang Kangri; 21：Mamostong Kangri, K35; 22：Saser Kangri II; 23：Saser Kangri III; 24：Pumari Chhish; 25：Passu Sar; 26：Yukshin Gardan Sar; 27：Teram Kangri I; 28：Malubiting; 29：K12; 30：Sia Kangri; 31：Momhil Sar; 32：Skil Brum; 33：Haramosh Peak; 34：Ghent Kangri; 35：Ultar Sar; 36：Rimo Massif; 37：Sherpi Kangri; 38：Yazghil Dome South; 39：Baltoro Kangri; 40：Crown Peak; 41：Baintha Brakk; 42：Yutmaru Sar; 43：K6; 44：Muztagh Tower; 45：Diran; 46：Apsarasas Kangri I; 47：Rimo III; 48：Gasherbrum V

Highest point
- Elevation: 7,852 m (25,761 ft); Ranked 21st
- Prominence: 1,765 m (5,791 ft)
- Listing: Ultra
- Coordinates: 36°12′19″N 75°12′28″E

Geography
- Location: Gilgit-Baltistan region, Pakistan
- Parent range: Hispar Muztagh, Karakoram

Climbing
- First ascent: August 26, 1971 by Andrzej Heinrich, Jan Stryczynski, Ryszard Szafirski, Andrzej Zawada
- Easiest route: Northwest Spur to North Ridge (presumed)

Kunyang Chhish (Note: Urdu: کنیانگ چھیش; Burushaski: کنیݴݣگ ڇݵش, lit. 'corner peak') is the second-highest mountain in the Hispar Muztagh, a subrange in the Karakoram mountains in Pakistan. Alternative variations of the name are Kunyang Kish and Khinyang Chhish. Its height, also sometimes given as 7,823 metres (25,666 ft), is ranked 21st in the world.

== Etymology ==
Khinyang Chhish or Kunyang Chhish literally means "The corner peak" in Burushaski, the local language of Hunza-Nagir.

== Location ==
Kunyang Chhish is located along the northern flank of the Hispar Glacier, one of the major glaciers of the Karakoram. It is the source of the Yazghil glacier that terminates in the heart of Shimshal Valley. It rises northeast of the confluence of the Hispar Glacier and the Kunyang Glacier, while Distaghil Sar (the highest peak of the Hispar Muztagh) dominates the Kunyang Glacier on its northern end.

== Notable features ==
Kunyang Chhish is the 21st highest mountain in the world. It is also notable for its rise above local terrain: for example, it rises almost 4,000 metres (13,000 ft) above its southern base camp on the Kunyang Glacier, and it rises 5,500 metres (3.4 mi) above the Hunza valley in about 33 kilometres (108,000 ft). Though it shares a high key col with its parent Distaghil Sar to the north, it is a steep, pointed, and complex peak compared to Distaghil, which has a more rounded profile.

Not counting the two Pumari Chhish summits 4 kilometres (2.5 mi) to the ENE, the Kunyang Chhish massif has five peaks:

- Kunyang Chhish Main, 7,852 metres (25,761 ft)
- Kunyang Chhish South, 7,620 metres (25,000 ft), 700 m SSW, with a prominence of only about 100 metres (330 ft)
- Kunyang Chhish East 7,400 metres (24,300 ft), 2 km ESE, 240-metre (790 ft) prominence.
- Kunyang Chhish West, 7,350 metres (24,110 ft), 1.5 km W, 170-metre (560 ft) prominence. Also known as Pyramid Peak.
- Kunyang Chhish North, 7,108 metres (23,320 ft), 6 km NNE, 517-metre (1,696 ft) prominence.

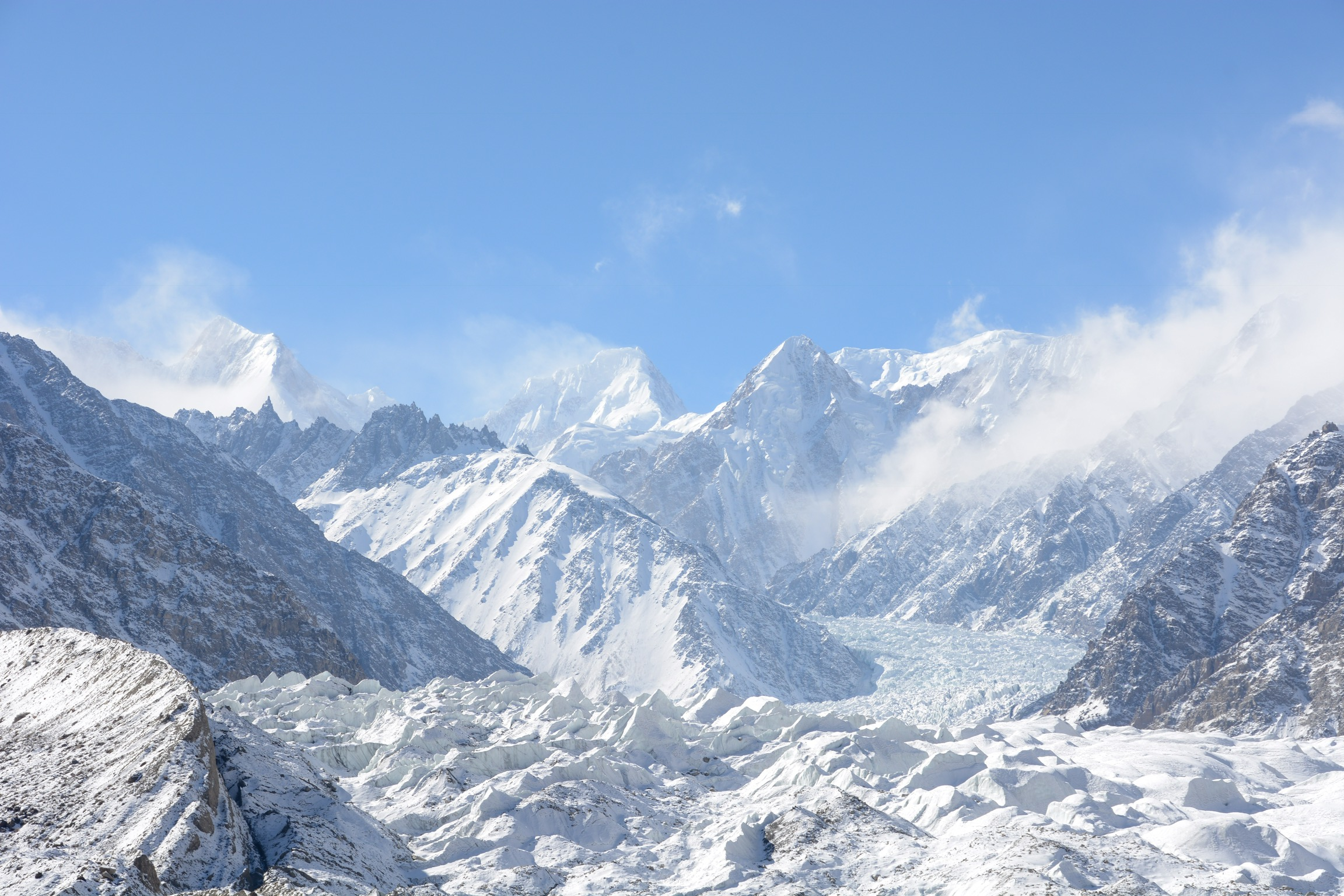
Khunyang Chhish (centre background) and Pumari Chhish (left background) as seen from Yazghil Sar's western slopes.

== Climbing history ==
The first attempt to climb Khunyang Chhish was made in 1962 but the climb was aborted after an avalanche on 18 July killed two climbers, Major James Mills and Captain M. R. F. Jones, at about 6,100 metres (20,000 ft) on the south ridge. Their bodies were never recovered.

The next attempt was in 1965 by a Japanese party mainly consisting of the University of Tokyo members. They also chose the south ridge of Kunyang Chhish, but another climber Takeo Nakamura died after the collapse of a narrow ridge at 7,200 m (23,600 ft).

The first ascent was accomplished by a Polish team led by Andrzej Zawada in 1971. They climbed a more direct, but nonetheless lengthy, route up the South Ridge of the peak from the Pumari Chhish Glacier. However, one of their members, Jan Franczuk, was killed in a crevasse accident.

The second, and only other recorded ascent, was by two British climbers, Mark Lowe and Keith Milne, who climbed the Northwest Spur to the North Ridge and completed this route on July 11, 1988. The route had first been attempted in 1980, and had been attempted again in 1981, 1982 and 1987.

The Himalayan Index lists three recent attempts on this peak, in 2000 and 2003. With just six known ascents and at least five confirmed deaths during attempts, the mountain has one of the steepest fatality rates in the Karakoram.

After four failed expeditions, starting in 2003, the East Summit was first ascended in July 2013 by an Austrian/Swiss team over the South Wall. This ascent was nominated as one of the five finalists for the 2014 Piolet d'Or.

=== Kunyang Chhish North ===
In 1979 Kohei Echizenya led a Japanese expedition from Hokkaido University which made the first ascent of the north ridge of Kunyang Chhish (7108 m). Base Camp was established on June 17 at 4,400 m (14,300 ft) on the Kunyang Glacier. They followed the same route as the expedition to Pumari Chhish as far as the north col. Three camps were set up on the north ridge, the highest being Camp IV at 6,700 m (22,000 ft). On July 11 all eight climbers reached the summit.

== See also ==
- List of mountains in Pakistan
- Gilgit-Baltistan, Pakistan
- Highest mountains of the World
- List of ultras of the Karakoram and Hindu Kush
