= Hispar Pass =

Pakistani mountain pass

Hispar Pass ཧིསྤར་ལ།
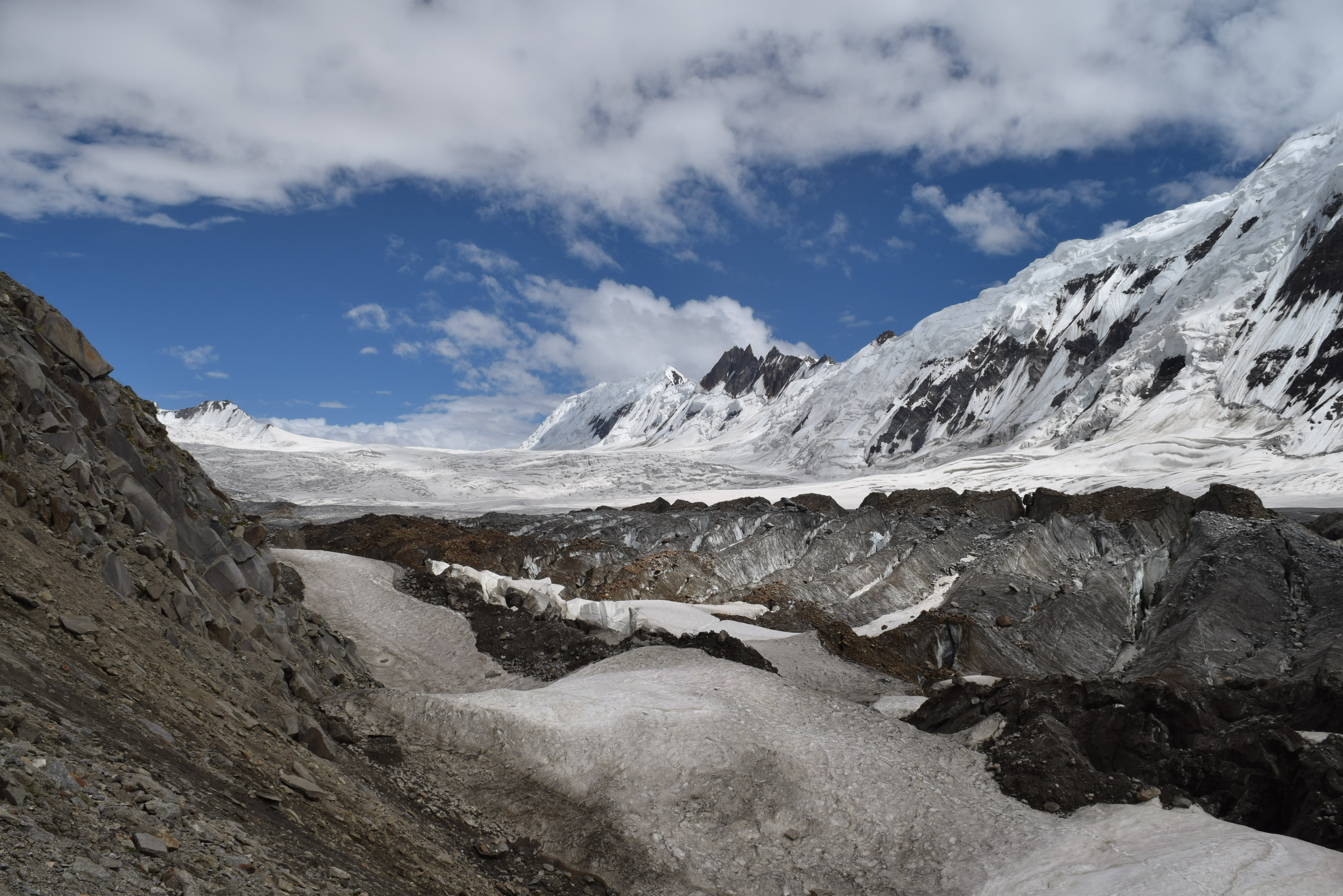
- Biafo Glacier and Hispar Glacier meet to form the world's longest glacial traverse outside of the polar regions
- Interactive map of Hispar Pass ཧིསྤར་ལ།
- Elevation: 5,128 metres (16,824 ft)

Third Approach
- Location: Gilgit-Baltistan, Pakistan
- Range: Karakorum Range
- Coordinates: 36.019°N 75.546°E

Hispar Pass or Hispar La (Urdu: درہ ہسپر; ) (el. 5,128 m/16,824 ft) is a high-altitude, non-technical mountain pass in the Karakoram Range in Nagar District, Gilgit-Baltistan, Pakistan.

At the pass, the Biafo Glacier (63 km long) and Hispar Glacier (49 km long) meet to form the world's longest glacial traverse outside of the polar regions, 100 kilometers in length.

== See also ==
- Hispar Glacier
- Biafo Glacier
