= Hispar Glacier =

Glacier in Pakistan

- ཧིསྤར་གངས། (Balti)
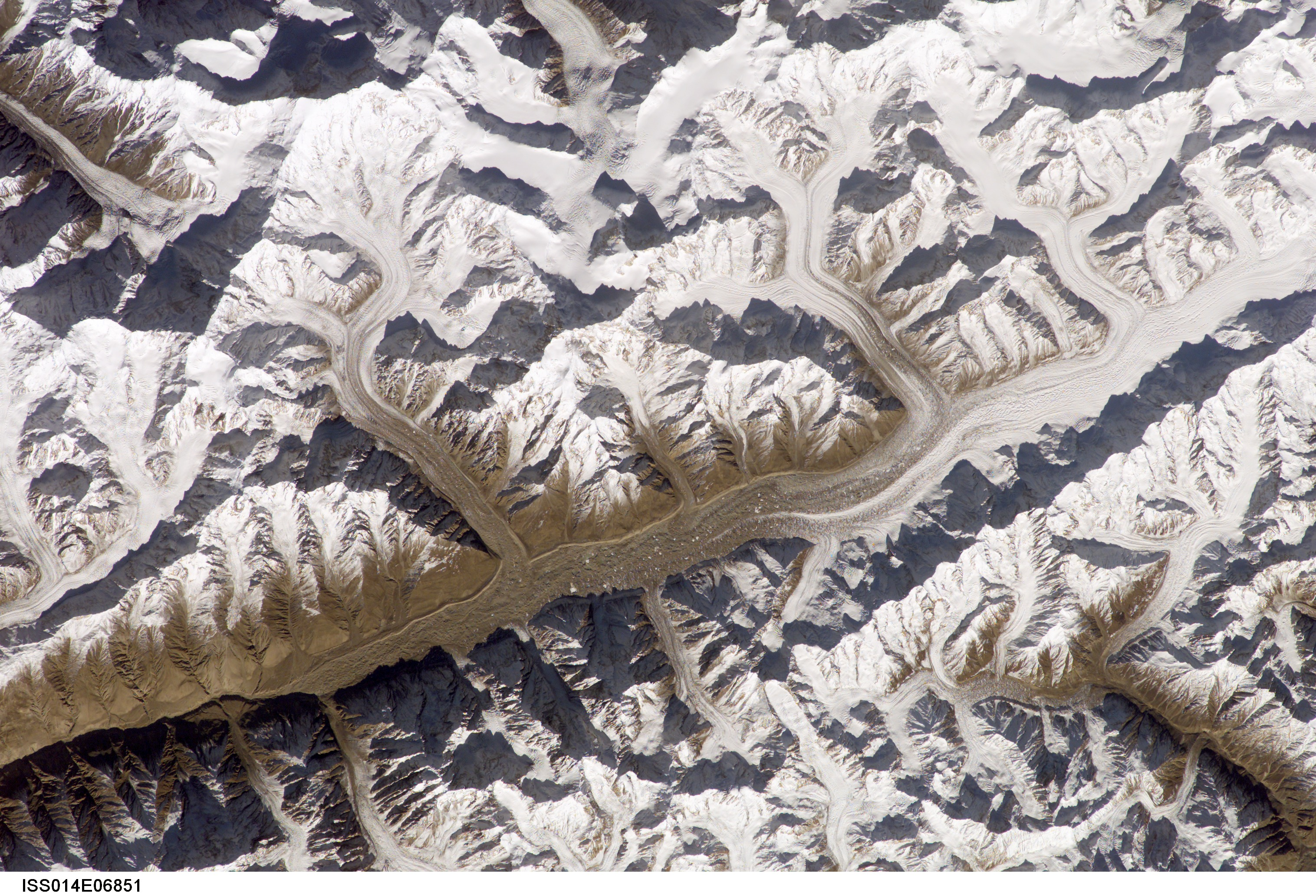
- Hispar glacier and Hispar Muztagh above (to the North) with Distaghil Sar, Kunyang Chhish, Pumari Chhish, Kanjut Sar on a photo taken from the ISS.

- Location within Karakoram Location within Gilgit Baltistan
- Interactive map of Hispar Glacier
- Type: Mountain glacier
- Location: Karakoram range, Hispar Valley, Gilgit-Baltistan, Pakistan
- Coordinates: 36°05′N 75°16′E
- Length: 100 km (62 mi)ManiahDavis

Hispar Glacier (Balti: ཧིསྤར་གངས།, romanized: Hispar gangs; Urdu: ہسپر گلیشر) is a 49-km (30-mile) long glacier situated in the Karakoram Mountains of Gilgit–Baltistan, Pakistan. It converges with the Biafo Glacier, which extends for 67 kilometers (42 miles), at the Hispar La (Pass), reaching an altitude of 5,128 meters (16,824 feet). This confluence creates the world's longest glacial system outside of the polar regions.

== Details ==
The 100-km (62-mile) long ice highway serves as a connecting route between two ancient mountain kingdoms: Nagar in the west and Baltistan in the east. The upper half of Biafo is particularly challenging due to the steep terrain and strenuous boulder hopping required on the lateral moraines and hillsides. The traverse becomes especially demanding when crossing the four major tributary glaciers from the north, and potential high nullah (stream) crossings can be hazardous.

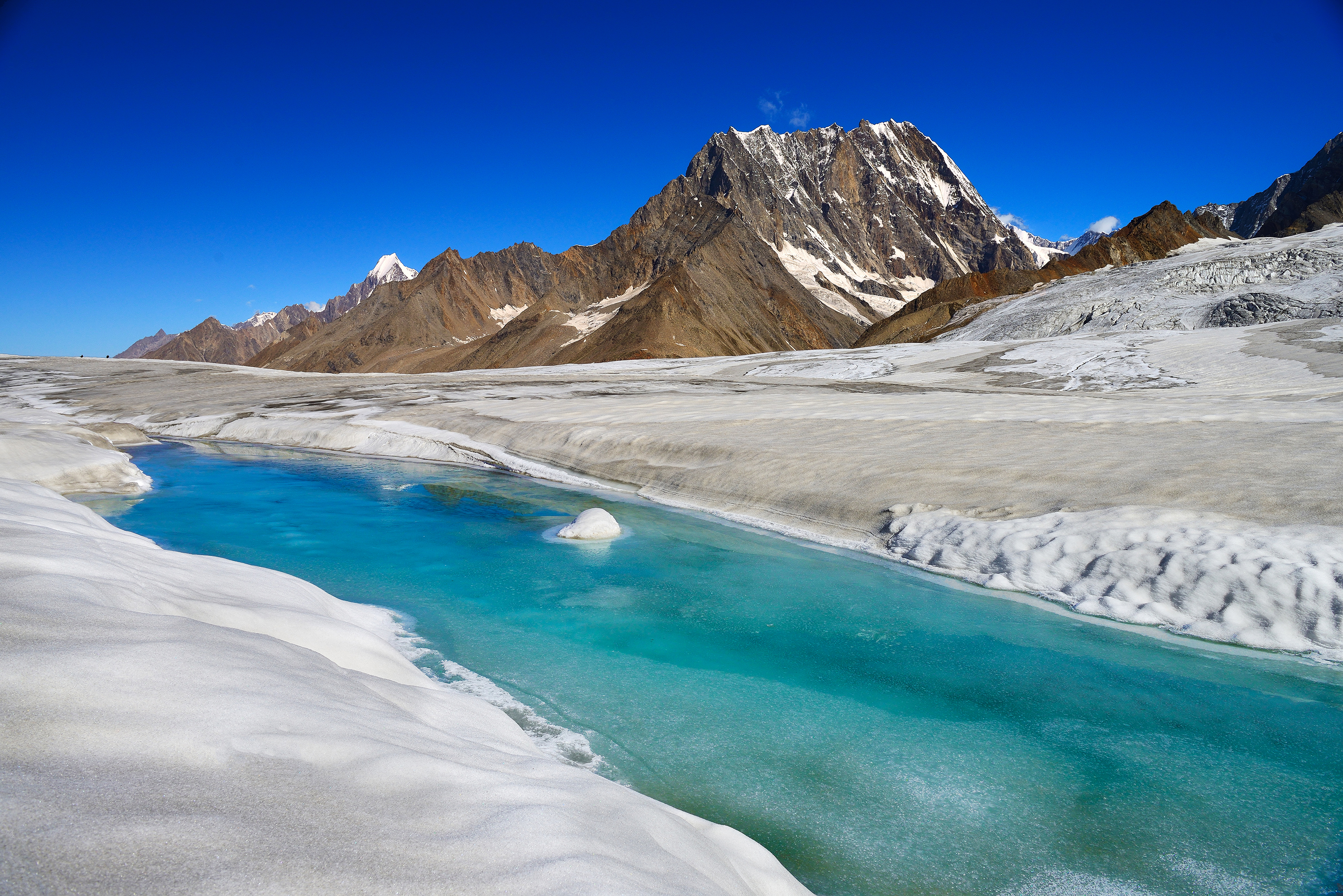
A glacial stream on Hispar glacier

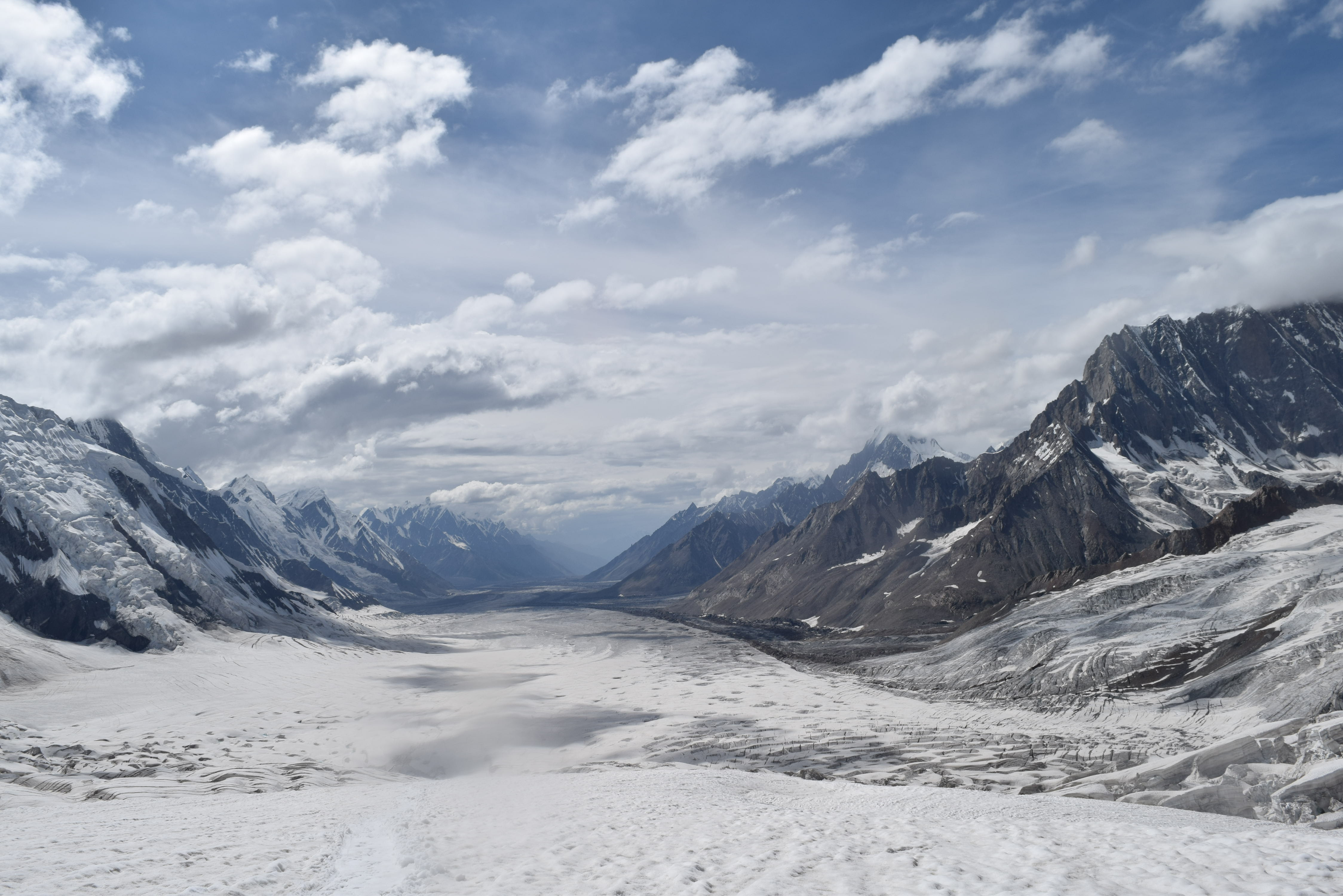
Snow Lake Pakistan

== Rivers ==
The Hispar River, a tributary of the Hunza River, rises from the meltwater of the glacier.

== See also ==
- Central Karakoram National Park
- List of mountains in Pakistan
- List of highest mountains
- List of longest glaciers
- Hispar Muztagh
