= Biafo Glacier =

Glacier in Pakistan

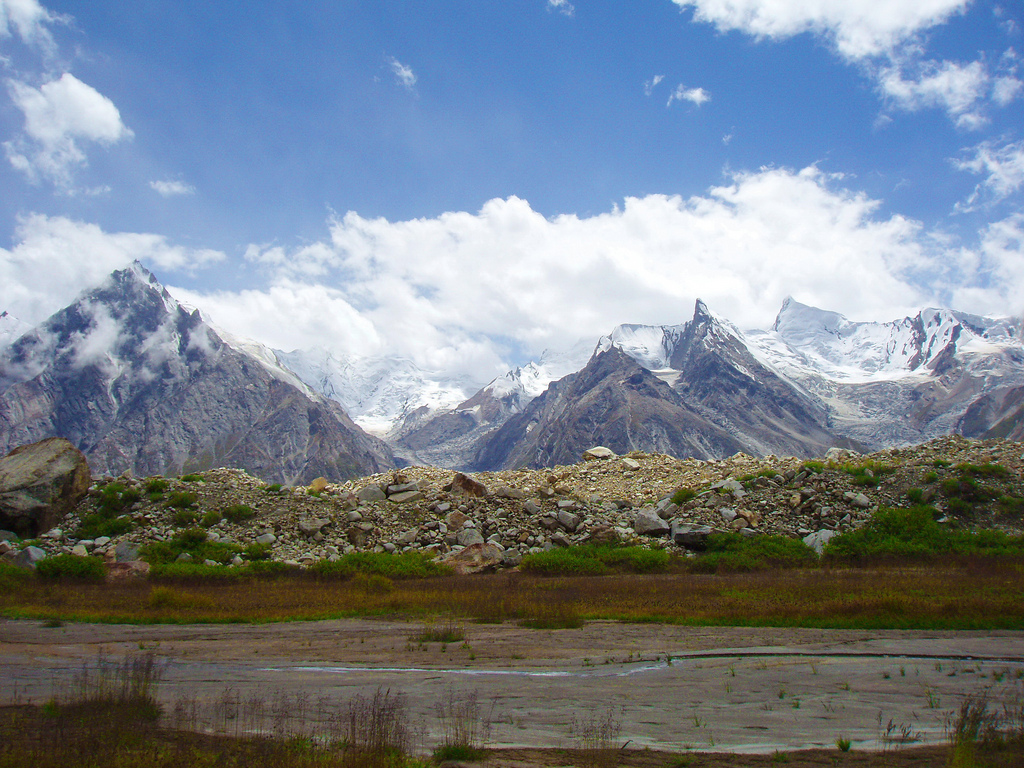

- Location within Karakoram Location within Gilgit Baltistan Location within Kashmir Location within Pakistan
- Interactive map of Biafo Glacier
- Type: Mountain glacier
- Location: Karakoram, Hispar Valley, Pakistan
- Coordinates: 35°41′N 75°55′E
- Length: 67 kilometres (42 mi)

The Biafo Glacier (Urdu: بیافو گلیشیر) is a glacier located within the Karakoram mountain range in the Hispar Valley, Nagar District of Gilgit-Baltistan, Pakistan. It extends over a considerable distance, measuring 67 kilometres (42 mi) in length, and ranks as one of the largest glaciers in the entire Karakoram range. Flowing in a south-eastern direction from the central Karakoram crest, the glacier covers a basin area spanning 853 square kilometres (329 sq mi), of which 628 square kilometres (242 sq mi) are characterized by permanent snow and ice. The accumulation zone alone contributes to 68% of the glacier's total area.

== Geography ==
Biafo Glacier converging at Hispar La with 49 kilometres (30 mi) long Hispar Glacier situated at an elevation of 5,128 metres (16,824 ft), forms the glacial system considered as the world's longest non-polar glacial system which spans an overall distance of around 120 kilometres (75 mi). This frozen pathway links two ancient mountain regions, connecting Nagar in the west with Shigar District, Baltistan in the east. Approximately, 20 kilometers (12 miles) from the village of Askole in Braldo, Shigar District, this glacial junction is found. The entire journey spans 100 kilometers (62 miles), utilizing 51 kilometers (42 miles) of the Biafo Glacier and the entirety of the Hispar Glacier.

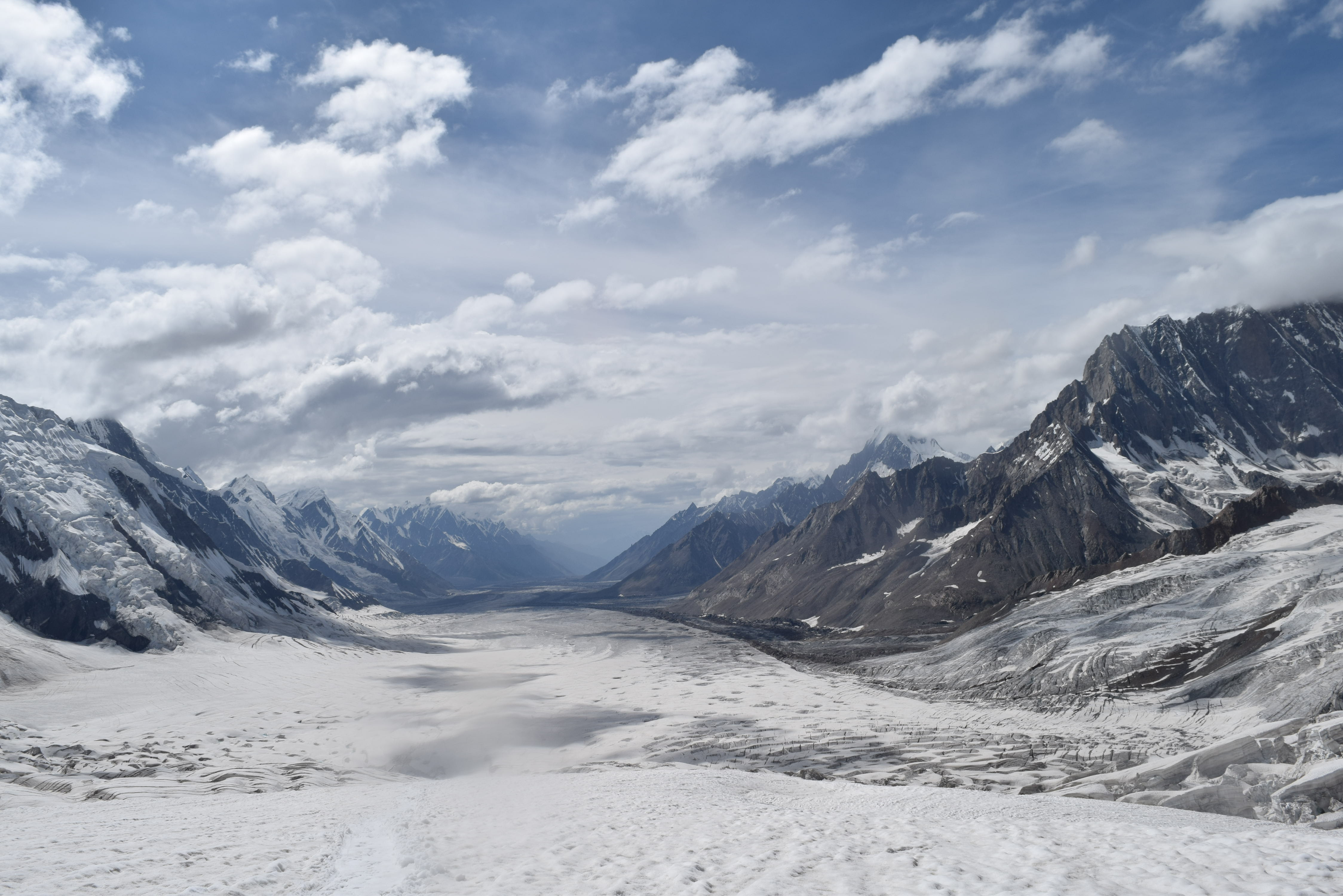
Snow Lake near the glacier

The Biafo Glacier presents a trekker with several days of strenuous boulder hopping, with views throughout and Snow Lake near the high point. Snow Lake, consisting of parts of the upper Biafo Glacier and its tributary glacier Sim Gang, is one of the world's largest basins of snow or ice in the world outside the polar regions, up to 1,600 m (0.99 mi) in depth.

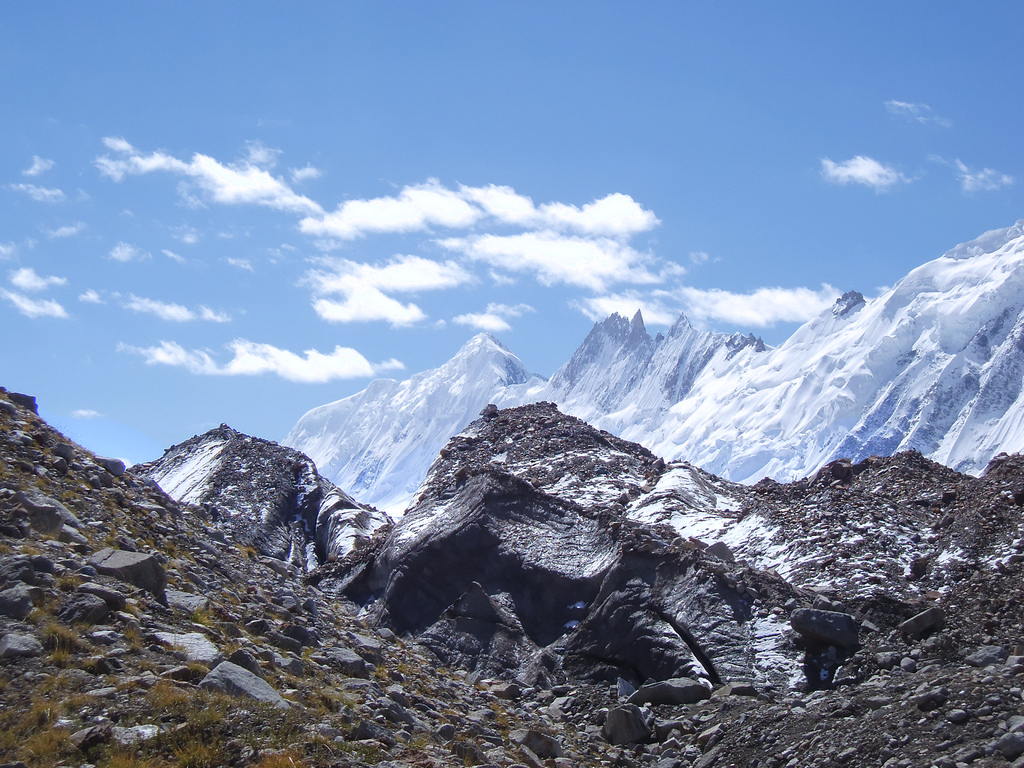
Biafo Glacier Hispar

The Biafo Glacier is the world's third longest glacier outside the polar regions, second only to the 70 km (43 mi) Siachen Glacier, contested between Pakistan and India, and Tajikistan's 77 km (48 mi) long Fedchenko Glacier.

Campsites along the Biafo are located off the glacier, adjacent to the lateral moraines and steep mountainsides. The first three (heading up from the last village before the glacier, the thousand-year-old Askole village) are the sites with flowing water nearby. Mango and Namla, the first two campsites, are often covered in flowers and Namla has an waterfall very close to the camping area. Baintha, the third campsite, is often used as a rest day. A large green meadow has a few running streams near the camp and many places to spend the day rock climbing or rappelling.

Evidence of wildlife can be seen on the trek, including Ibex and the Markhor mountain goat. The area is also known for Himalayan brown bears and snow leopards, although sightings are rare.

== See also ==
- Baltoro Glacier
- Godwin-Austen Glacier
- Sarpo Laggo Glacier
- Eight-thousander
- List of highest mountains

== Sources ==
- Auden, J. Bicknell (1934). Mason, Kenneth (ed.). "Notes on the Biafo Glacier in Baltistan". The Himalayan Journal. 6.
- Featherstone, B. K. (April 1926). "The Biafo Glacier". The Geographical Journal. 67 (4): 351–354. doi:10.2307/1782831. JSTOR 1782831.
- Hewitt, Kenneth (2014). Glaciers of the Karakoram Himalaya: Glacial Environments, Processes, Hazards and Resources. Dordrecht: Springer Netherlands Imprint Springer. pp. 65–68. ISBN 978-94-00-76311-1.
