= Hispar River =

River in Pakistan

Coordinates: 36°18′N 74°39′E

The Hispar River (Urdu: دریائے ہسپر) forms from the melt water of the Hispar Glacier - a 49-kilometer-long glacier in the Karakoram mountains of Gilgit-Baltistan, Pakistan. The Hispar Glacier and river both flow northwest, passing through Hispar, Hopar and Nagar (Nagir) villages until the confluence with the Hunza River in the Hunza Valley. Road conditions are spectacular at best, treacherous at worst. In August 2006, a bridge below Hispar village was condemned, and the Hunza River washed the road away at the confluence, eliminating all vehicular access to the entire valley for some months.

== See also ==
- Hispar
- Attabad Lake
