= Hispar Muztagh =

Karakoram sub-range in Gilgit-Baltistan

- 海斯帕尔慕士塔格山
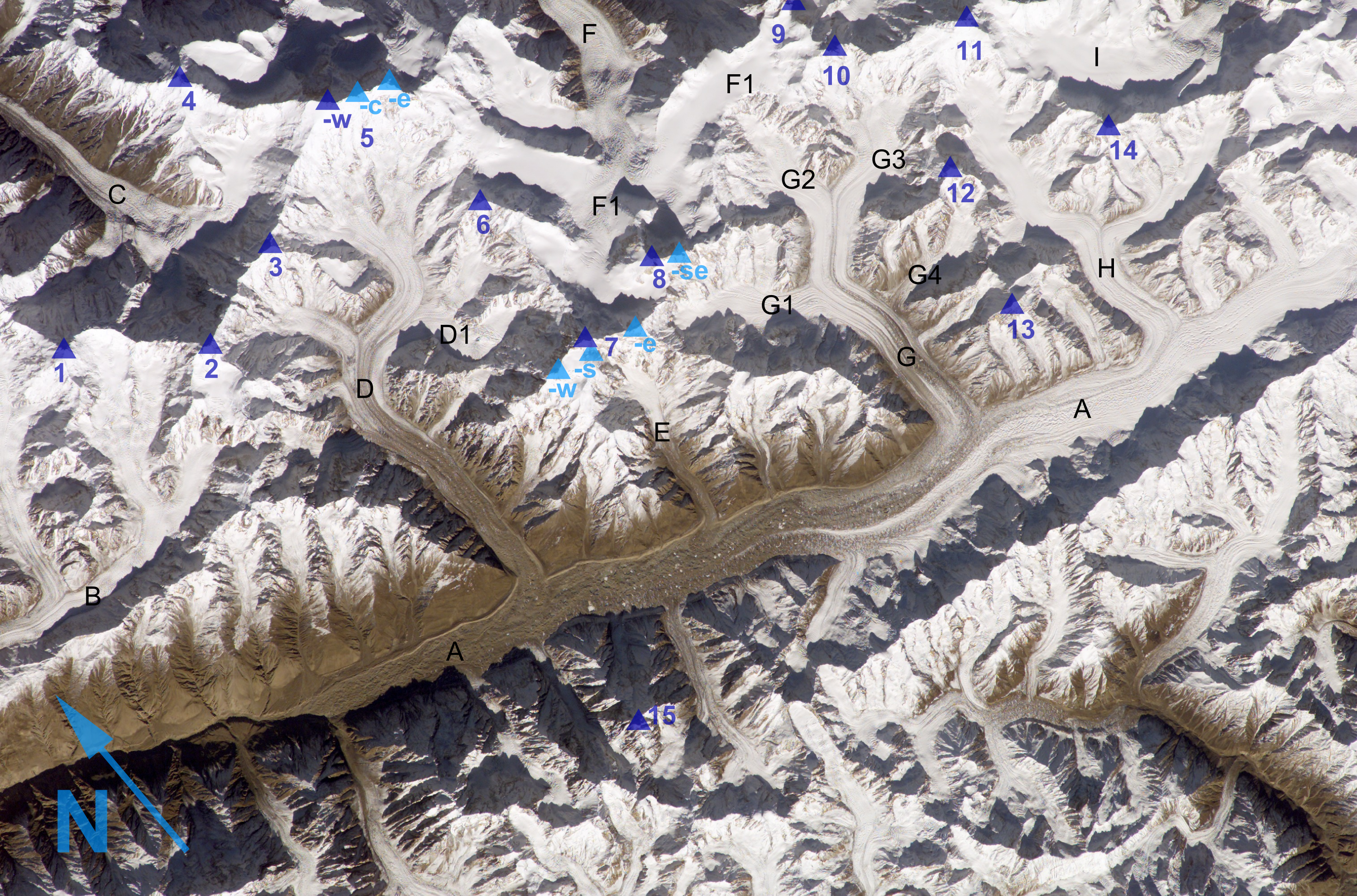
- Hispar Muztagh seen from ISS

Highest point
- Peak: Distaghil Sar
- Elevation: 7,885 metres (25,869 ft)
- Coordinates: 36°20′N 75°11′E

Geography
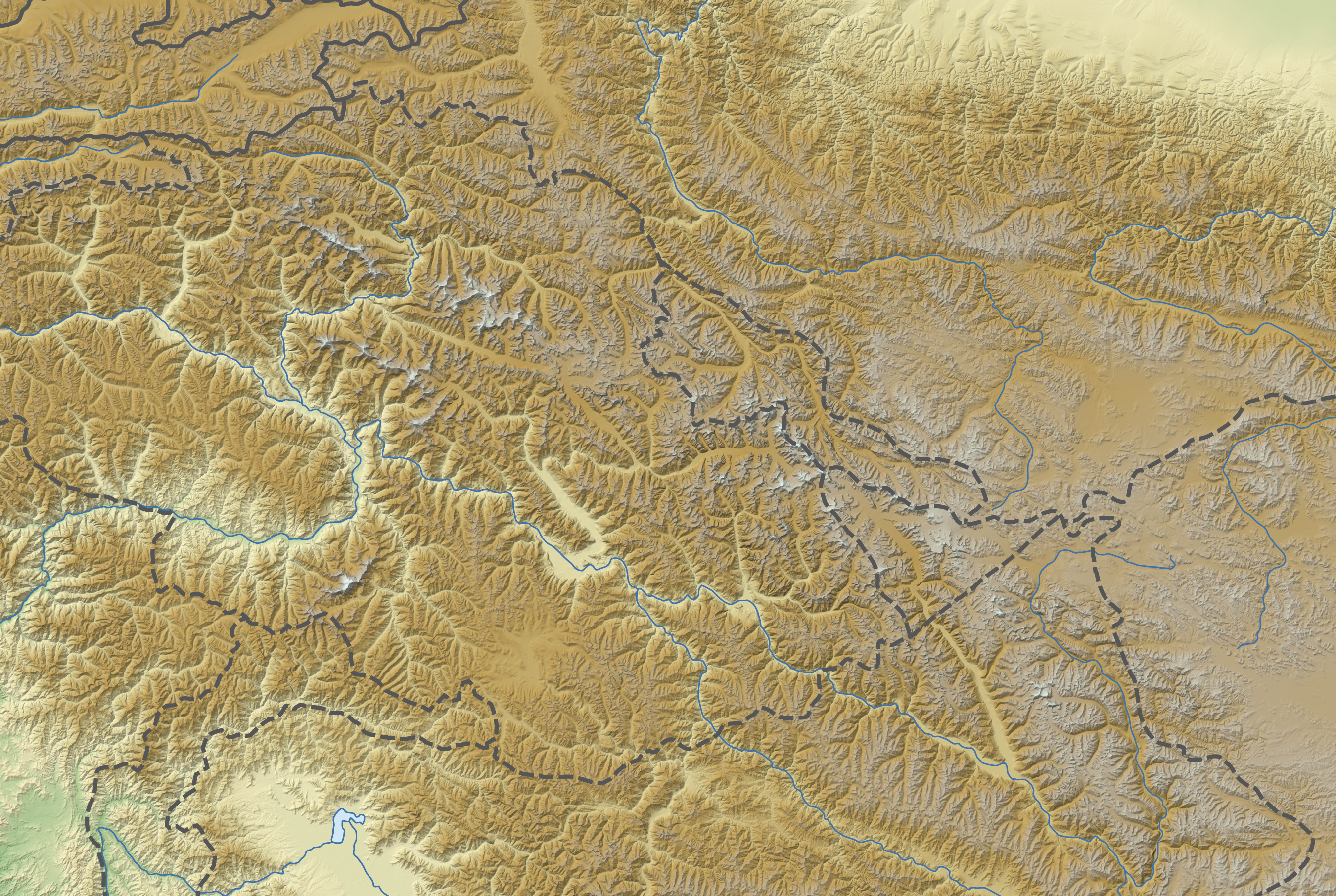
- Location within Karakoram Location within Gilgit Baltistan
- Region: Gilgit-Baltistan
- Parent range: Karakoram

Hispar Muztagh is a sub-range of the Karakoram mountain range. It is located in the Nagar District of Gilgit-Baltistan, administered by Pakistan. It lies north of Hispar Glacier, south of Shimshal Valley, and east of the Hunza Valley. It is the second highest sub-range of the Karakoram, the highest being the Baltoro Muztagh. The highest mountain in the range is Distaghil Sar (7,885m/25,869 ft).

== Selected peaks in the Hispar Muztagh ==
Mountain	Height (m)	Height (ft)	Coordinates	Prominence (m)	Parent mountain	First ascent	Ascents (attempts)
Distaghil Sar	7,885	25,869	36°19′33″N 75°11′18″E	2,525	K2	1960	3 (5)
Khunyang Chhish	7,823	25,666	36°12′19″N 75°12′28″E	1,765	Distaghil Sar	1971	2 (6)
Kanjut Sar	7,760	25,558	36°12′18″N 75°25′04″E	1,690	Khunyang Chhish	1959	2 (1)
Trivor	7,577	24,859	36°17′15″N 75°05′10″E	1,000	Distaghil Sar	1960	2 (5)
Pumari Chhish	7,492	24,580	36°12′40″N 75°15′10″E	884	Khunyang Chhish	1979	1 (2)
Yukshin Gardan Sar	7,469	24,505	36°15′00″N 75°22′30″E	1,313	Pumari Chhish	1984	4 (1)
Momhil Sar	7,414	24,324	36°19′04″N 75°02′11″E	990	Trivor	1964	2 (6)
Yazghil Dome South	7,324	24,029	36°19′N 75°13′E	<500	Distaghil Sar	???	???
Yutmaru Sar	7,283	23,894	36°13′40″N 75°22′05″E	620	Yukshin Gardan Sar	1980	1 (1)
Lupghar Sar	7,200	23,622	36°20′52″N 75°00′57″E	730	Momhil Sar	1979	1 (0)
Bularung Sar	7,200	23,622	36°18′N 75°08′E	<500	Trivor	???	???

== Note ==
1. These are from the Himalayan Index, which may not be completely accurate, as some climbs may not have been recorded in the climbing literature or indexed properly.

== Sources ==
Jerzy Wala, Orographical Sketch Map of the Karakoram, Swiss Foundation for Alpine Research, Zurich, 1990.
