= Chumar Bakhoor =

Gemstone mining area in Gilgit-Baltistan, Pakistan

Chumar Bakor
- Chumar Bakor
- Location within Pakistan

Highest point
- Coordinates: 36°13′33″N 74°40′37″E

Geography
- Location: Sumayar Valley Nagar District, Gilgit-Baltistan, Pakistan

Chumar Bakor, also spelled Chumar Bakor, is a gemstone mining area located at an elevation of 5,520 meters in Sumayar Valley of Nagar District, Gilgit-Baltistan, Pakistan. Geographically, it is also closer to the Oyum-Nagar (Nagarkhas). It takes a trek of 4 to 5 hours to reach the pegmatites that crop out on the western side of the mountain above 4,000 meters in elevation. Appiani (2007) states that (according to Blauwet and Shah, 2004) the gemstone deposits at Chumar Bakor were first discovered in 1984 by local hunter Muhammad Shah. Chumar Bakor contains various precious and semi-precious gemstones such as aquamarine, fluorite, apatite, calcite, and quartz.

== Precious and semi-precious gemstones ==
- Aquamarine
- Fluorite

== Chumar Bakor Pass ==
The Chumar Bakor pass links the Sumayar valley with Nagar Khas.

== See also ==
- Nagar Valley
- Nagar District
- Gilgit-Baltistan
