= Sumayar =

River valley in Pakistan

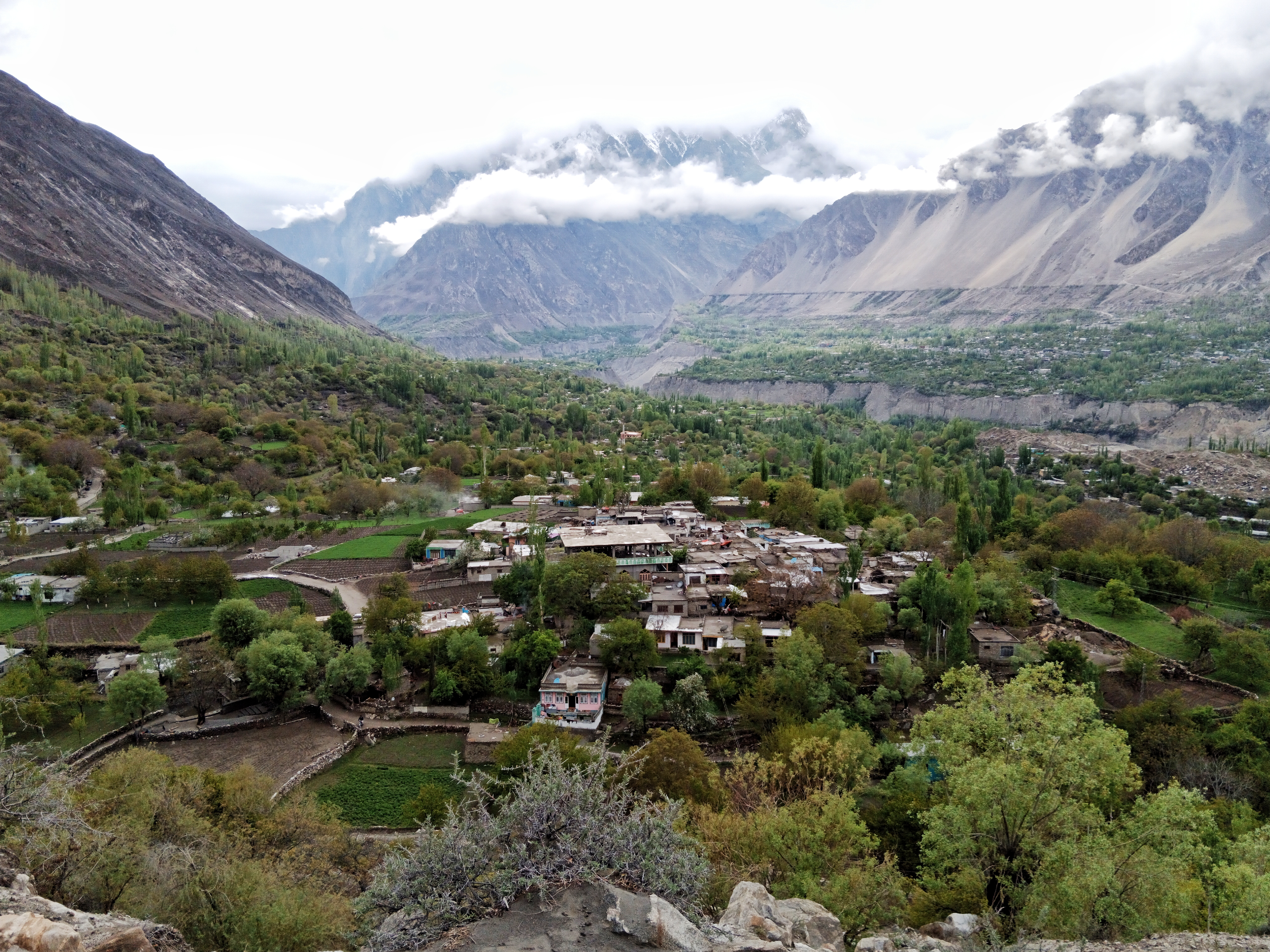
- A view of Sumayar from Burum Baris

- Location within Gilgit Baltistan Location within Pakistan

Naming
- Native name: سمئر (Urdu)

Geography
- Location: Nagar Valley, Gilgit Baltistan, Pakistan
- District: Nagar District
- Coordinates: 36.30436°N 74.64848°E
- Interactive map of Sumayar

Sumayar (Urdu: سمائر; Burushaski: سمئر) is a small valley situated within the Nagar District of Gilgit-Baltistan, Pakistan. The valley is located at the confluence of the Hunza and Nagar rivers in Pakistan. It is bounded by an eroded landscape to the north-east and mountain ridges to the south. The valley is composed of nine small villages: Khai, Futhkhai, Yal, Boshat, Rashfari, Resman, Daltho, Thopkhan, and Jotorkhan.

It is located approximately 100 km (62 mi) from Gilgit city, from where it takes about 90 minutes to reach this valley. The nearby areas of Sumayar include Askurdas and Shayar, and collectively, they are referred to as SAS Valley. Sumayar Valley boasts numerous tourist attractions, including snowy mountains such as Dumani on the northeast side of Diran (7,266 m), Silkiyang Peak, Silkiyang Glacier, Altusill and Menamgusham meadows, Baraimochay Farimuch, Hayano camping sites, Mamubar stream, and the gemstone mining area known as Chumar Bakoor.

The valley contains the reserves of various gems and minerals such as Aquamarine, Fluorite, Apatite, Calcite, and Quartz. The famous aquamarine mining area Chumar Bakhoor is also situated in the Sumayar Valley.

== Geography ==
The valley is located at the confluence of the Hunza and Nagar rivers. It is surrounded by Nagarkhas from the east, Askurdas from the west, Ganesh from the north, and mountain ridges including Diran from the south.

== Geomorphology ==
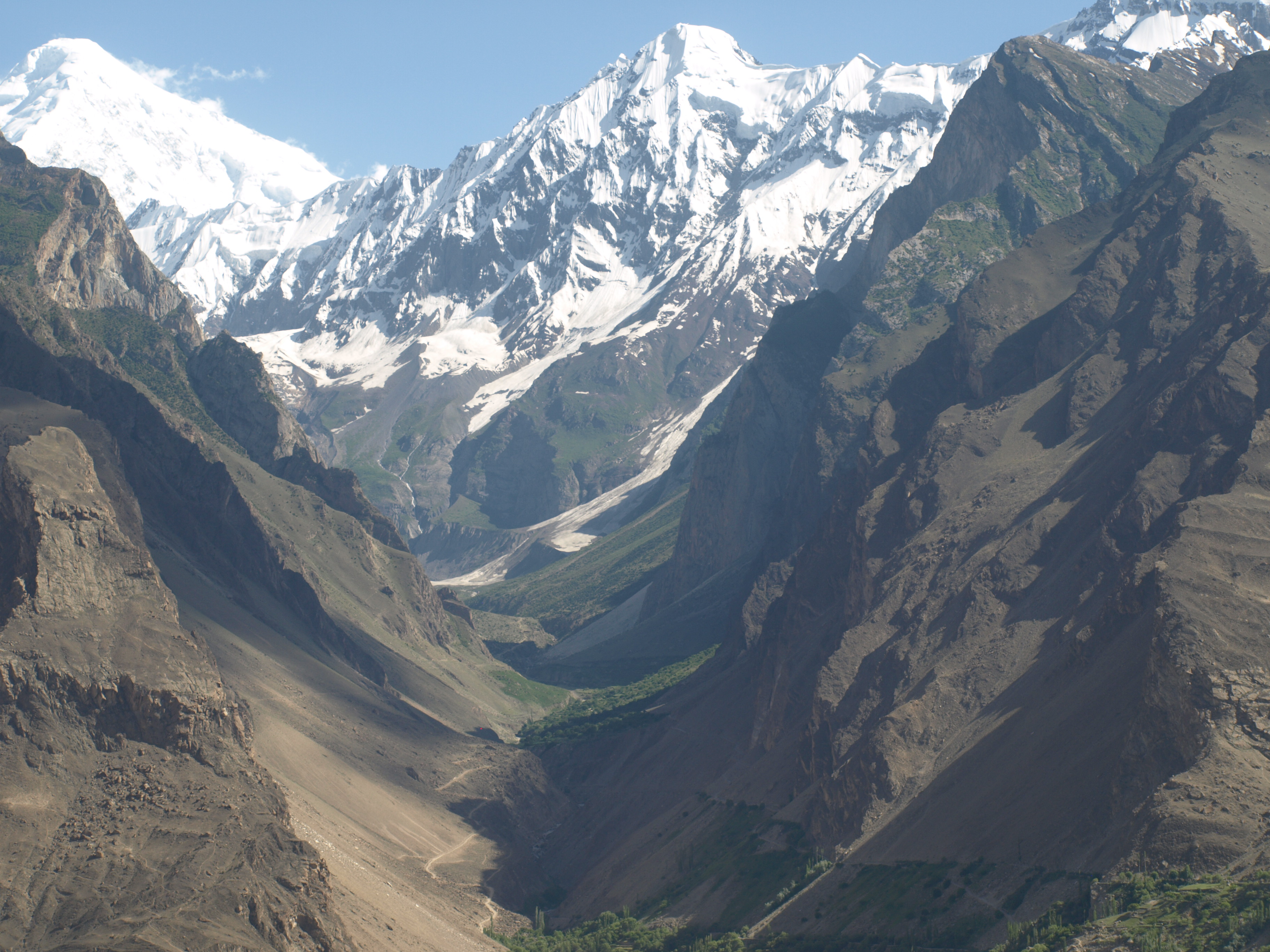
Aerial view of Mamuber stream

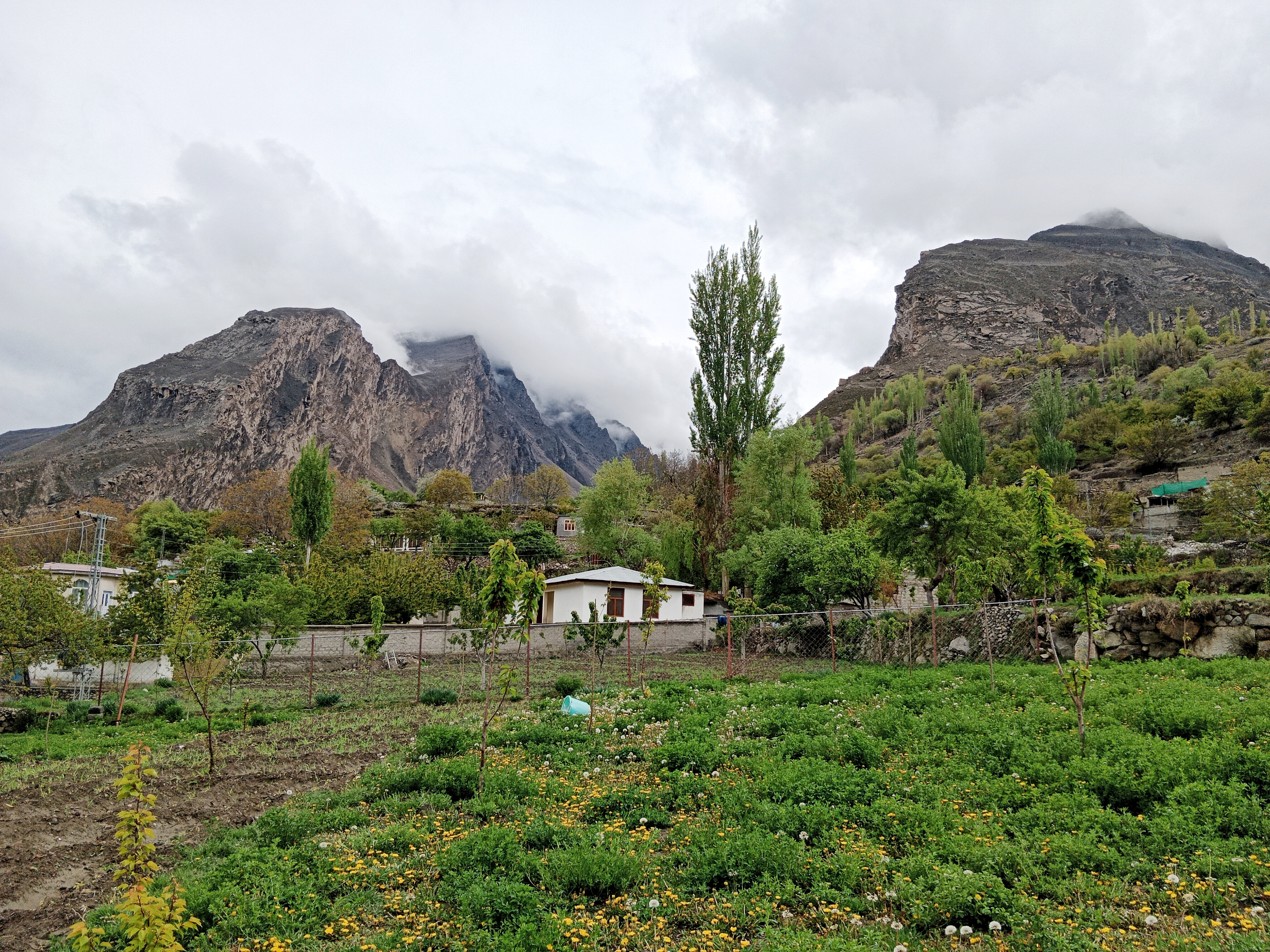
Boshat Village of Sumayar Valley

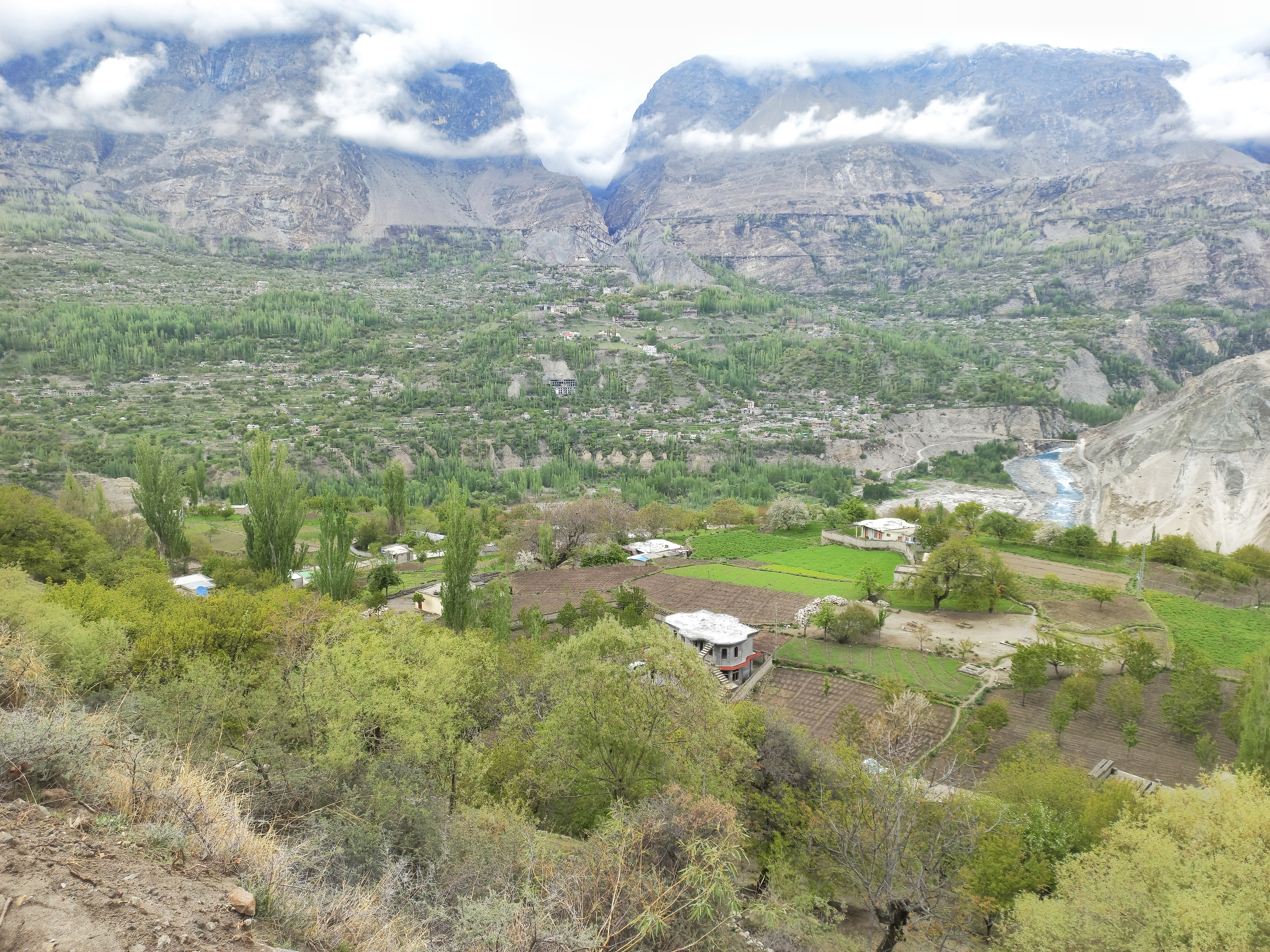
An aerial view of Upper Boshat Sumayar

The valley exhibits an elevation of 2,000 m (6,600 ft) at its northern entrance and rises to over 7,000 m as one moves towards the south, covering a distance of approximately 15 km (9.3 mi). The highest peak in this region, Diran, stands at an elevation of 7,257 m (23,809 ft) and is situated in the southern section of the valley. Mamubar serves as the principal stream, and several tributaries contribute to it. Geographically, the valley can be divided into three distinct geomorphological units: the upper part, the middle part, and the lower part.

The Upper part: The upper and southern part of the valley is usually covered with ice and a glacier. The upper part of the valley can be conveniently further divided into two parts - the extreme upper region that is occupied by a permanent glacier Silkiang and Ghamultur. And the lower region is of relatively low ascent with snaking of the Mamubar stream. At places, it is occupied with avalanches and materials from lateral moraines.

The Middle part: The middle region of the valley is a narrow canyon that is flanked by high precipices, probably due to outcrop rock of the Sumayar granite. This part of the valley is mostly covered by deep snow during the winter.

The Lower part: The Lower part is comparatively wide and open. On the terraces of the valley, there is vegetation but the remaining areas of skeletal soil are lacking agricultural activity. The depth of the Mamuber stream increases and flows as a single channel.

== Chumar Bakhoor (Chumar Bakur) ==
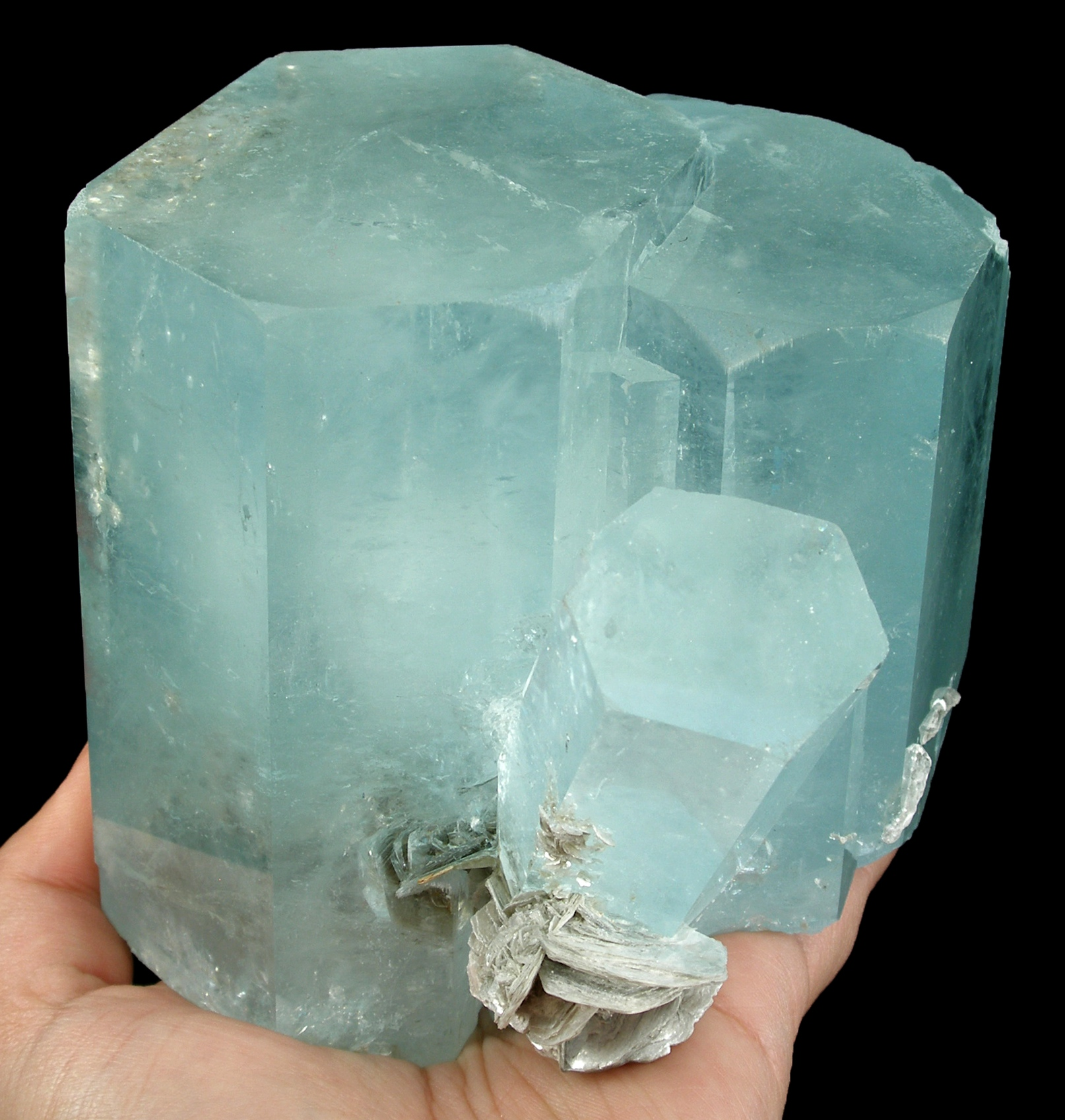
Chumar Bakur Aquamarine

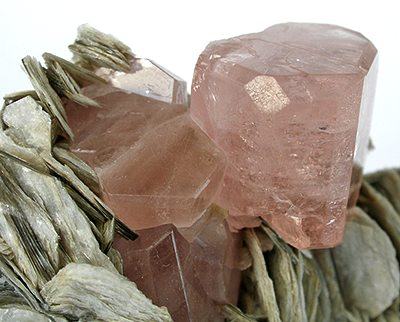
Fluorite from Chumar Bakur Mines

Chumar Bakhoor is located at an elevation of 5,520 m (18,110 ft) in the Sumayar Valley of Nagar District, Gilgit-Baltistan, Pakistan. Geographically it is also closer to the Nagarkhas. The Chumar Bakhoor pass links the Sumayar valley with the Nagar Khas. Walking from central Sumayar, it takes around 4 to 5 hours to reach the pegmatites that crop out on the western side of the mountain above 4000 meters elevation. Appiani (2007) states that according to (Blauwet and Shah, 2004) the gemstone deposits at Chumar Bakhoor were first discovered in 1984 by local hunter Muhammad Shah. According to Blauwet (2006), the prominent fluorite locality in Pakistan is Chumar Bakhoor, which Blauwet notes is generally called Nagar. The fluorite occurs here in a variety of colors and crystal habits, that includes cubes, octahedra, and dodecahedra. Spinel-law twins have also been found here in incredible sizes.

Octahedral fluorite from the pegmatites of Chumar Bakhoor of Sumayar valley, Nagar district has been known for quite some time. Green, white to pink fluorite associated with gemmy aquamarine, and pale pink to dark orange-pink fluorapatite on muscovite druses from the Chumar Bakhoor have been reaching the market since 1984. According to Appiani, (2007) the size and variety of fluorite crystals from the chumar Bakhoor; and the equal-sized crystals of fluorite, aquamarine, and fluorapatite together on the Matrix Specimens are extremely impressive. Pink octahedral crystals, from Pakistan, sometimes associated with aquamarine and fluorapatite on muscovite, have been known for many years. However, the specimens from the Chumar Bakoor are far superior to those from previous discoveries, ranking them among the finest known examples of the species.

== Peaks, glaciers and meadows ==
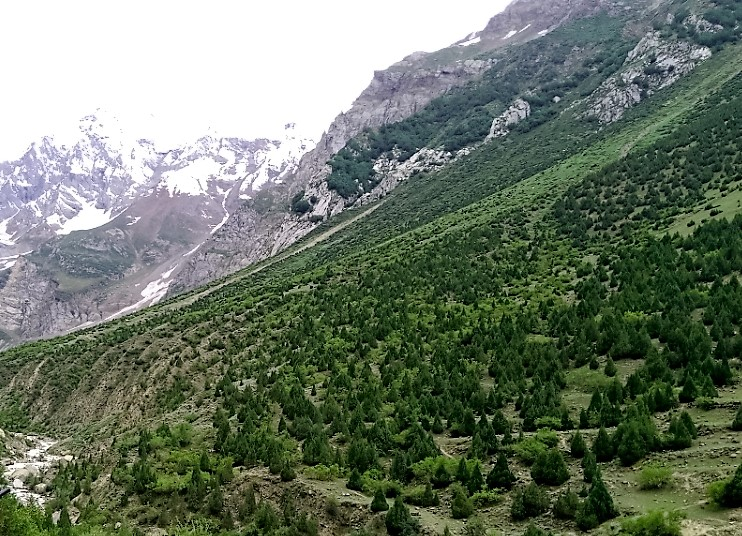
Menamgusham meadows, Sumayar Valley

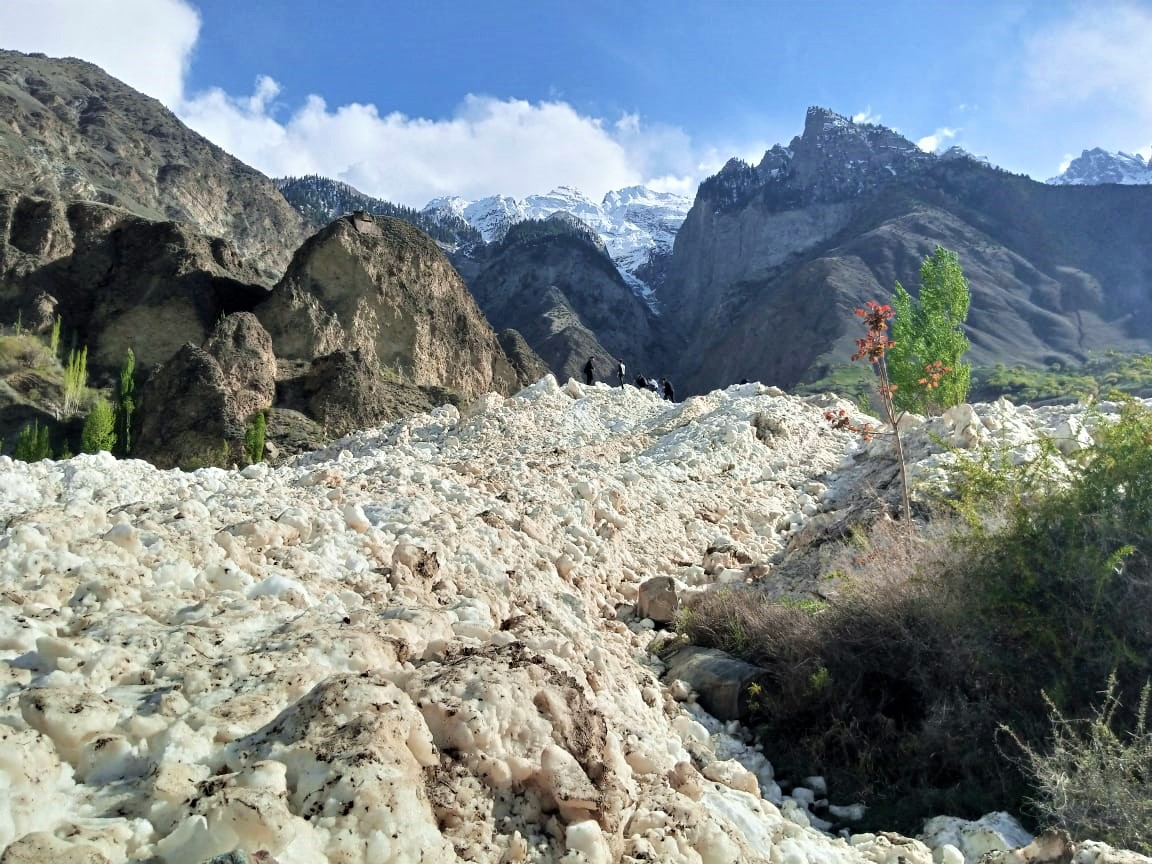
Manbull avalanche, Sumayar Valley

=== Peaks ===
- Dumani (North-east side of Diran)
- Silkiyang Peak

=== Glaciers ===
- Silkiyang Glacier
- Ghaintur Glacier

=== Meadows ===
- Silkiyang
- Menamgusham
- Baraimuch-e-fari
- Goyosho
- Harai Ghutom
- Baraimoch-e-Pharimuch: name is combination of two Brushaski words "Barai" means fairy and 'Phari' means field or pond. It is a hayfield alongside the Mamuber stream in Sumayar Valley of Nagar District, Gilgit-Baltistan. It is around 5 km from Karakoram Highway.

=== Regular avalanche tracks ===
- Manbull Har
- Saaelji Har
- Menamgusham Har
- Silkiyang Har

== Waterfalls and streams ==
=== Waterfalls ===
- Shotti Gor Waterfall
- Manbull Waterfall

=== Streams ===
- Mamubar stream

== Valleys nearby ==
- Nagarkhas
- Hoper Valley
- Hispar
- Gappa Valley
- SAS Valley
