= Dadhimal =

Pakistani village

Dadimal is a small village in Nagar District, Gilgit-Baltistan, in northern Pakistan. It is located between Fakar and Miacher (close to Kacheli Lake).
