= Hispar Valley =

Valley in Gilgit Baltistan, Pakistan

Hispar
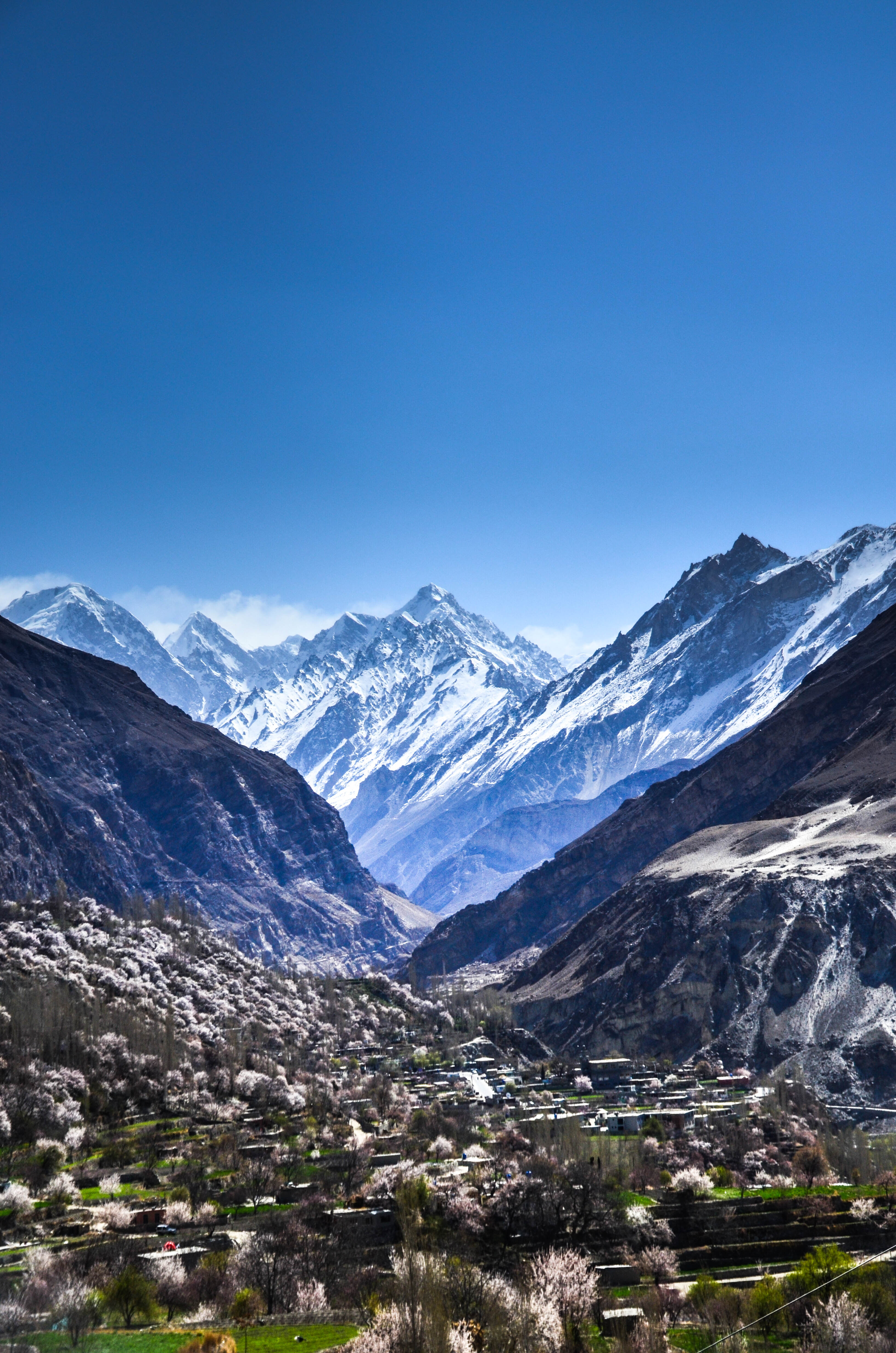
- Hispar Valley

- Location in Pakistan
- Coordinates: 36.17456°N 74.98842°E
- Country: Pakistan
- Region: Gilgit Baltistan
- District: Nagar District

The Hispar Valley (also spelled Hisper valley), is the final valley in Nagar district of Gilgit-Baltistan, Pakistan. It is located approximately two kilometers downstream from the 49-kilometer-long Hispar Glacier. The valley is roughly 28 km from Nagar Khas and 25 km from Hopar Valley. It is accessible via a road leading from the Karakoram Highway towards Nagar and the Hopar Valley. The Hispar Valley serves as a vital link between the Nagar and Shigar districts, connected by the Hispar Pass at an elevation of 5,128 m (16,824 ft).

== Peaks, glaciers and mountain passes ==
=== Peaks ===
- Golden Peak
- Miar Peak
- Malubiting
- Hispar Sar
- Kunyang Chhish
- Hispar Sar

=== Glaciers ===
- Hispar Glacier
- Biafo Glacier

=== Mountain passes ===
- Hispar Pass

== Valleys nearby ==
- Hoper Valley
- Nagarkhas
- Nagar Valley
- Sumayar Valley
- Hunza Valley

== See also ==
- Biafo Glacier
- State of Nagar
