= Hunza Valley =

Valley in Pakistan-administered Gilgit-Baltistan

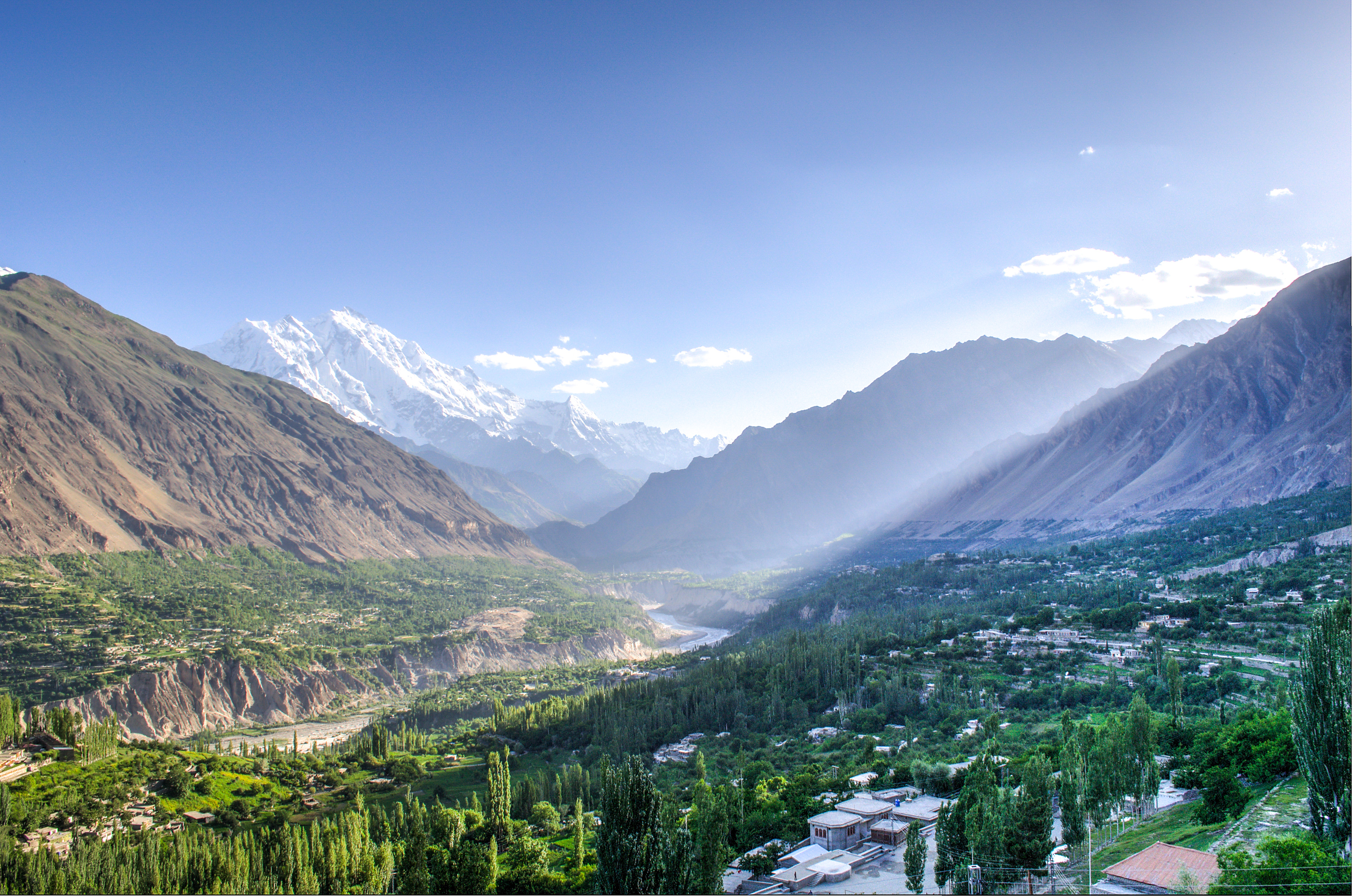
- View of the Valley

- Location within Gilgit Baltistan Location within Pakistan

Naming
- Native name: ہُنزݳ دِش (Burushaski)

Geography
- Country: Pakistan
- State/Province: Gilgit-Baltistan
- Coordinates: 36.316942°N 74.649900°E
- River: Hunza
- Interactive map of Hunza Valley

The Hunza Valley, (Note: Burushaski: ہُنزݳ دِش, romanized: hunzā diś; Urdu and Wakhi: وادئ ہنزہ, romanized: wādī-ē hunzā) also known as the Hunza-Nagar Valley, is a mountainous river valley traversed by the Hunza River in Gilgit-Baltistan region, in Pakistan-administered Kashmir.

== Geography ==
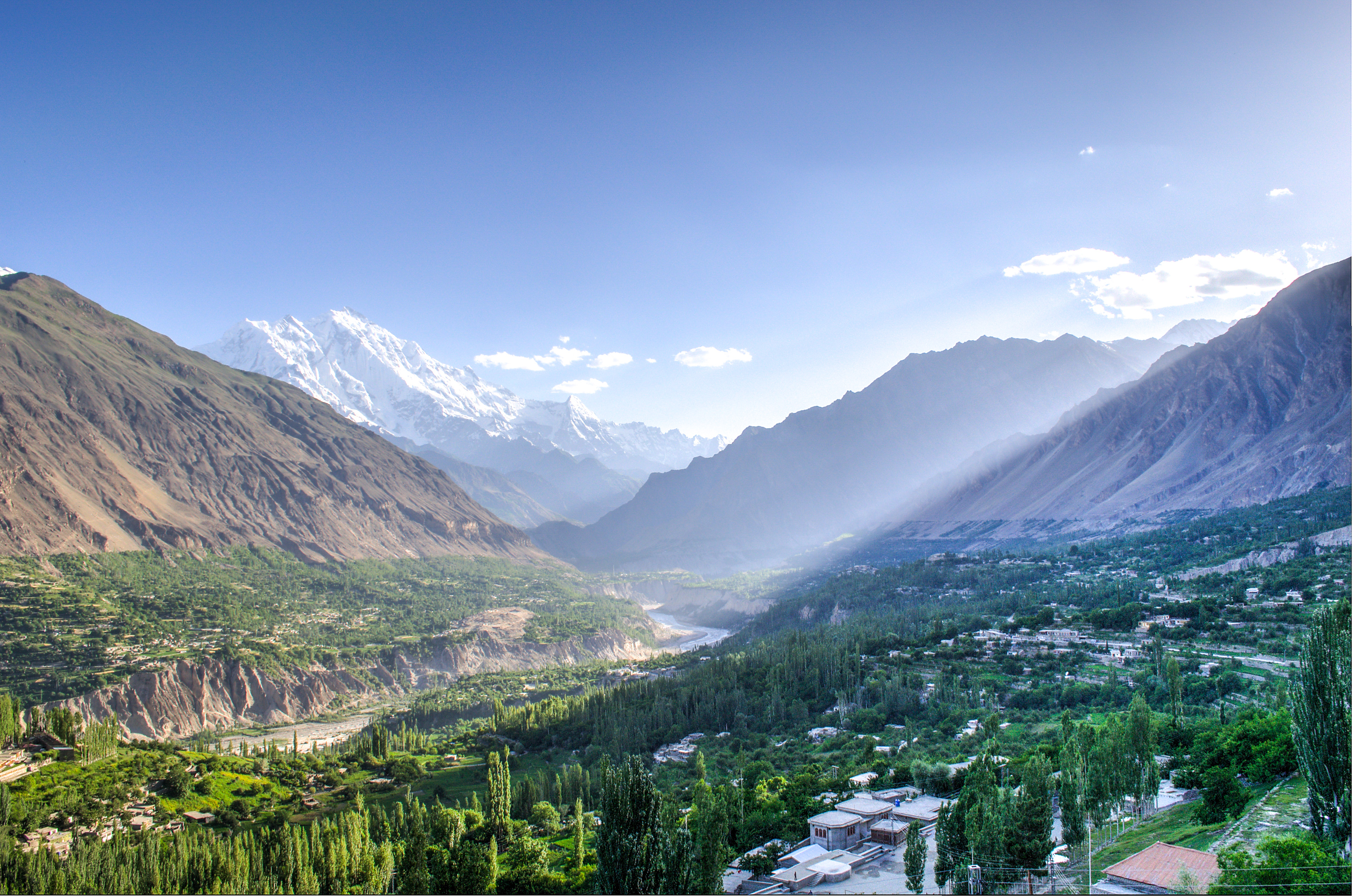
Hunza Valley in early spring

The valley stretches along the Hunza River, which forms near Passu by the confluence of several streams fed by melting glaciers in the upper watershed of Karakoram range, including Shimshal, Khunjerab, Chupursan, and Misgar. Further downstream, Hopar River from Hopar Valley and Hispar River from Hispar Valley combine near Nagarkhas, and fall into Hunza River. The valley widens around Karimabad, and is home to many settlements such as Aliabad, Chalt, Nasirabad and Rahimabad. Further south a section of Hunza River Valley lies in the political district of Gilgit. Here Nalter River, coming from Naltar Valley, joins Hunza River. At Danyor, Hunza Valley opens into the Gilgit Valley, where Hunza River merges with the Gilgit River. Ishkoman Valley lies to the northwest, Shigar Valley to the southeast, Afghanistan's Wakhan Corridor to the north, and China's Xinjiang region to the northeast, of Hunza Valley.

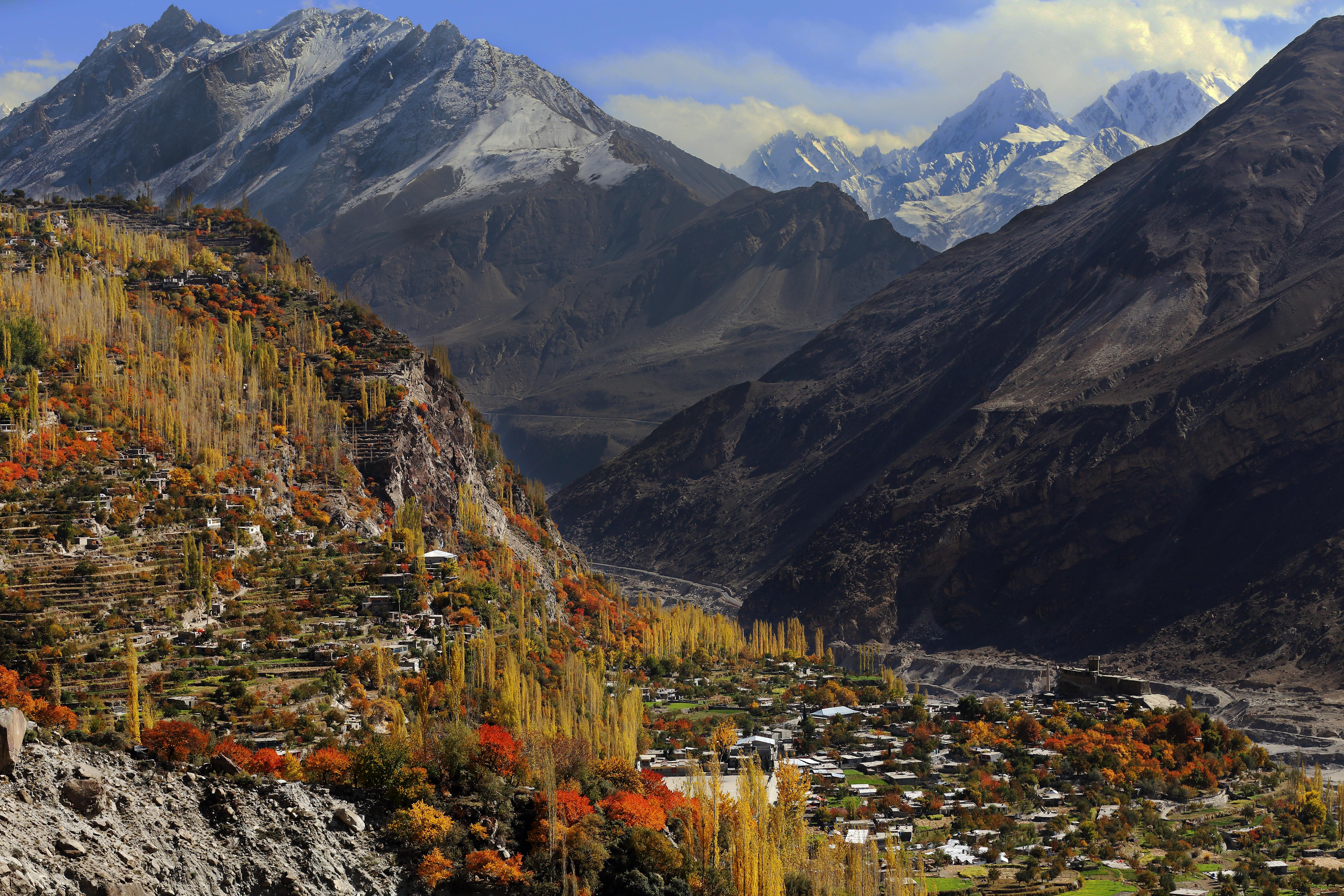
Hunza Valley in late autumn

The valley floor sits at an elevation of 2,438 meters (7,999 feet). Geographically, the Hunza Valley is divided into three parts: Upper Hunza (Gojal), Central Hunza, and Lower Hunza (Shinaki). The topography of the valley is characterized by steep valleys, rugged peaks, glaciers and active tectonic fault zones. The Karakoram mountain range envelopes the entire region. Geologically, the area is traversed by the Main Karakoram Thrust, a significant structural boundary associated with deep-seated geothermal activity. This fault system contributes to the emergence of natural hot springs across the region. Of the total area of valley, 90% is 3,000 meters above sea level and 30% is 5,000 meters above sea level. Politically, the valley is divided among the districts of Hunza, Nagar and Gilgit. The valley is situated along the Karakoram Highway, northwards from the city of Gilgit.

== History ==
Buddhism and, to a lesser extent, Bön were the primary religions in the area before the advent of Islam. The region holds several surviving Buddhist archaeological sites, such as the Sacred Rock of Hunza. Since then, most of the population has converted to Islam, predominantly following the Ismaili sect. The Hunza rock inscriptions were written in the ancient Brahmi script, created by Buddhist monks as expressions of worship and culture. With most locals converting to Islam, they had been mainly left forgotten, but are now being restored.

Hunza Valley was central in the network of trading routes connecting Central Asia to the subcontinent. It also provided protection to Buddhist missionaries and monks visiting the subcontinent, and the region played a significant role in the transmission of Buddhism throughout Asia.

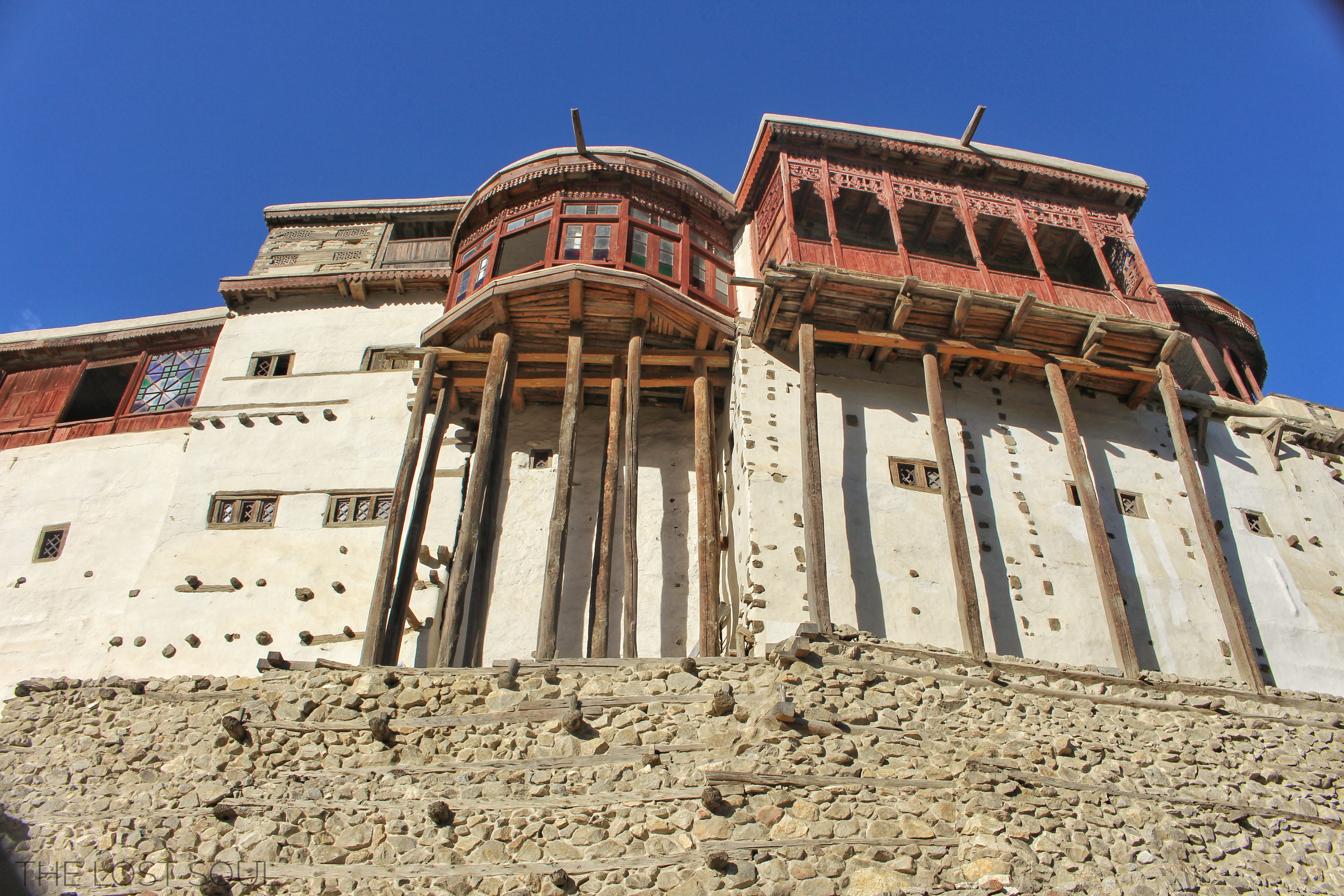
Baltit Fort, the former residence of the Mirs of Hunza

Historian Ahmad Hassan Dani believes that the Sakas (Scythians) used the Karakoram route to invade Taxila. The Sacred Rock of Hunza has petroglyphs of mounted horsemen and ibex, along with Kharoshti inscriptions that list the names of Saka and Pahlava rulers. The rock also contains inscriptions from the Kushan period, showing the Saka and Kushan suzerainty over the Hunza and Gilgit regions.

Hunza began to separate from the Gilgit Valley as a separate polity around 997 CE, but decisive separation occurred with the establishment of the Ayash ruling family in the 15th-century. The valley was then divided among neighbouring, and often rival, states of Hunza, which controlled upper watershed, and Nagar, and internecine battles between the two states were endemic. Following the invasion of Kashmir by the Mughal nobleman Mirza Haidar Dughlat, the Mir of Hunza established diplomatic relations with Kashgaria (Yarkand Khanate). After Kashgaria came under Chinese control, he continued relations with Kashgaria by paying an annual tribute of gold dust of 16 tolas to the Chinese government in Yarkand. In return for that token tribute, Hunza enjoyed territorial rights in the Raskam Valley and grazing rights in the Taghdumbash Pamir.

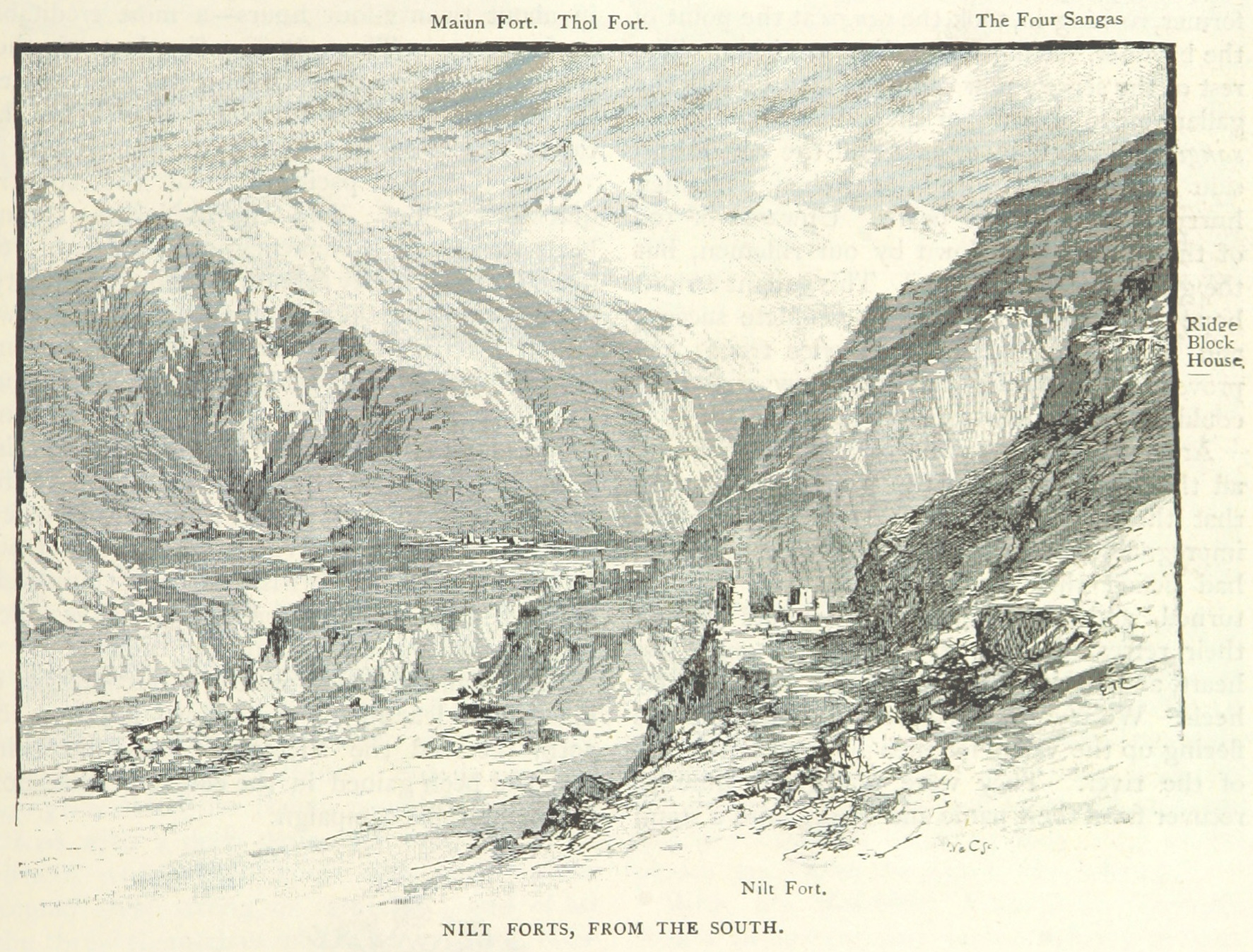
Nilt forts, Nagar

In the early 1800s, Hunza Valley played a vital role in the British "Great Game". After the British suzerainty was established over South Asia by 19th century, the princely state of Jammu and Kashmir was created under the 1846 treaty of Amritsar. The British gained control of Hunza and Nagar during the Anglo-Brusho war, locally known as Jangir-e-Lae. Jangir-e-Lae was fought between the people of Nagar state and the troops of the British Raj at Nilt from 1 to 23 December 1891. The British troops faced strong resistance from the people of Nagar under the leadership of the Tham (chief) of that time, Azur Khan, at the Nilt Nallah (known as Jamila Mo Har). The people of Nagar fought for more than 20 days but were defeated due to a lack of armaments. Over 100 Nagaris lost their lives and 127 were imprisoned. On the British side, four British officers and over 50 Dogra levies lost their lives. The British retained Nagar's status as a principality. Even after the revolt against the Maharaja of Kashmir, Nagar's status continued to be that of a princely state. Hunza too accepted the British suzerainty in 1891. The Mir of Hunza, Mir Safdar Ali Khan, fled to Kashgar, China, and the British army installed his brother Mir Nazim Khan (1892–1938) as a ruler of Hunza Valley, but all orders were passed by British officers who were appointed in the capital Gilgit." Hunza princely state bordered Xinjiang (autonomous region of China) to the northeast, Pamir to the northwest, the Gilgit Agency to the south and the former princely state of Nagar to the east, and survived until 1974. The state capital was the town of Baltit (now known as Karimabad); another old settlement is Ganish.

During the 1960s, people started protesting against the despotism of the Mir, demanding the abolition of Begar and reduction in taxation. In 1970, they organized a march to Gilgit to register their demands with the authorities, while Gilgit sent scouts against the people. The scouts opened fire on the demonstrators in Chalt, killing nine people and wounding many more. The leaders of the protest were imprisoned. Later, on 25 September 1974, Prime Minister of Pakistan Zulfiqar Ali Bhutto dissolved the princely states of Nagar and Hunza, set the prisoners free and gave democratic representation to the Northern Areas Council, now the Gilgit-Baltistan Assembly.

=== 2010 landslide ===
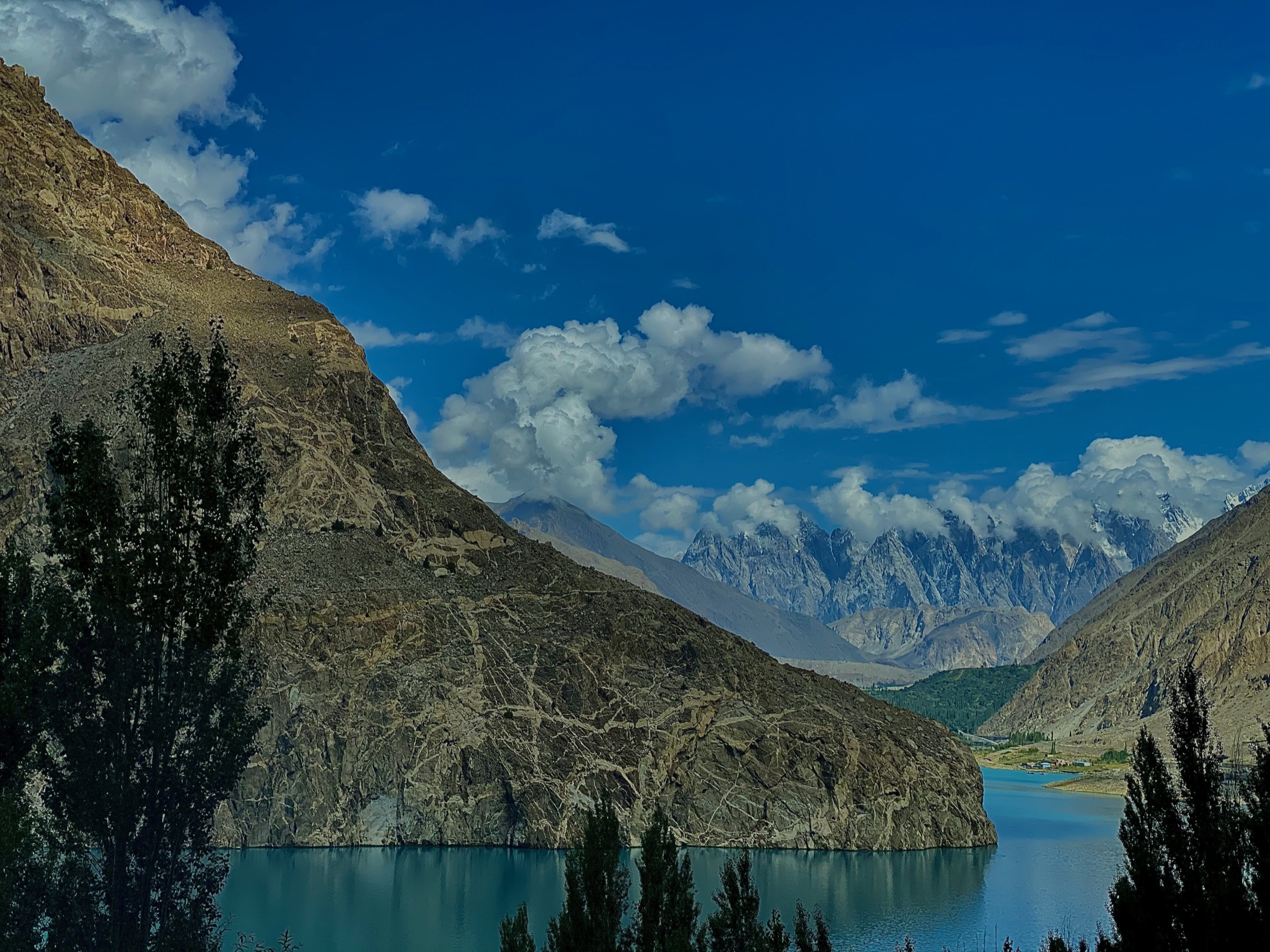
Attabad Lake in August 2020

On 4 January 2010, a landslide blocked the river and created Attabad Lake (also called Shishket Lake), resulting in 20 deaths and 8 injuries and effectively blocked about 26 kilometres (16 mi) of the Karakoram Highway. The new lake extends 30 kilometres (19 mi) and rose to a depth of 120 metres (400 ft) when it was formed as the Hunza River backed up. The landslide completely covered sections of the Karakoram Highway.

=== 2018 rescue mission ===
On 1 July 2018, Pakistan Army pilots rescued 3 foreign mountaineers stuck in a snow avalanche above the height of 5,800 metres (19,000 ft) on Ultar Sar Peak near Hunza. The weather conditions had made it difficult for the Army helicopter to go forth with a rescue operation on the 7,388 metres (24,239 ft) high Ultar Sar. Nonetheless, they completed it. Bruce Normand and Timothy Miller from the UK were successfully rescued alive while their companion Christian Huber from Austria had succumbed to the avalanche. Britain's High Commissioner Thomas Drew in Pakistan termed the mission "remarkable and dangerous".

== Tourism ==
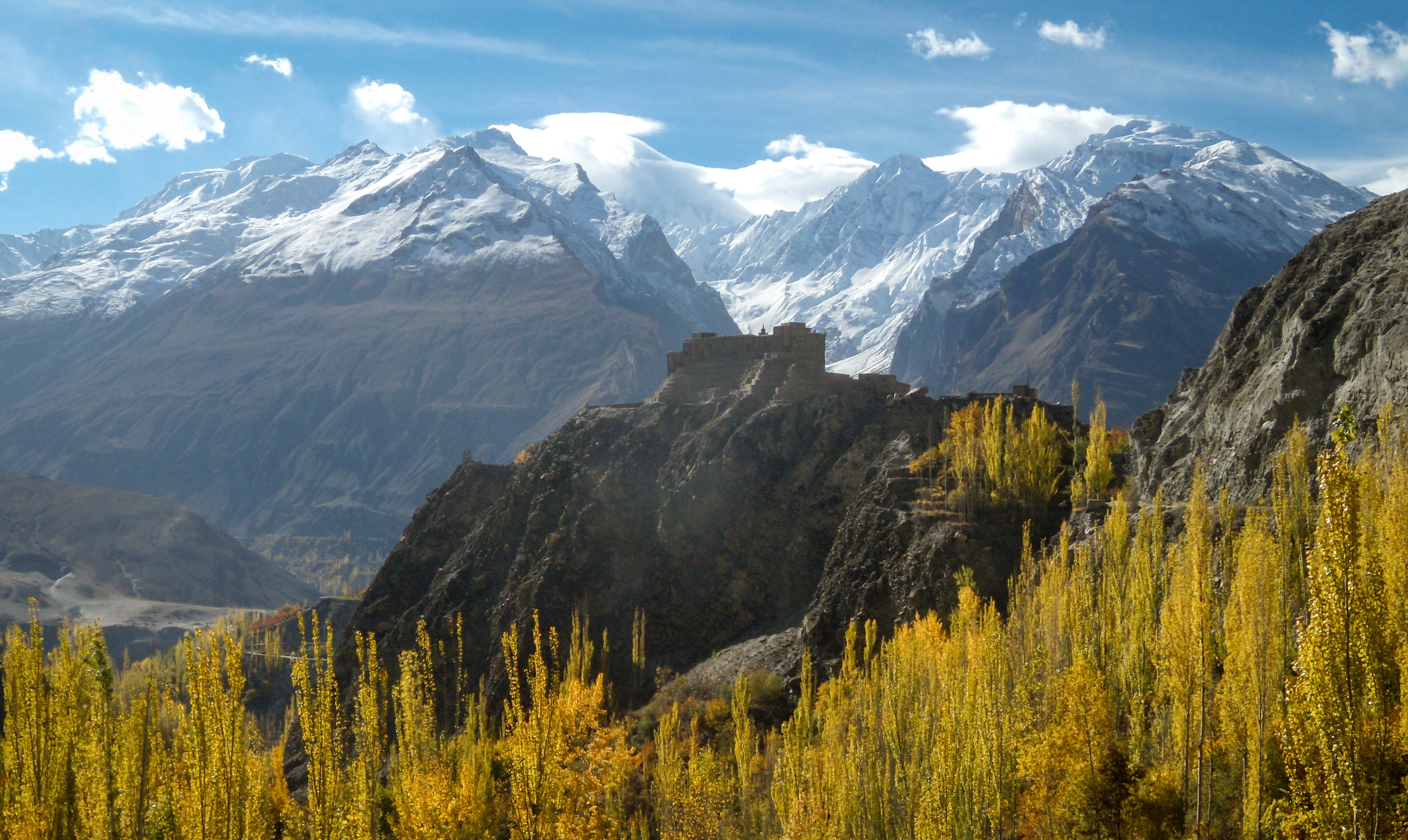
Baltit Fort as seen from Ultar Hunza

The Hunza Valley is home to several high peaks that rise above 7,000 m. It has a diverse religious history: it is home to several historic religious sites, including:

- the ancient watchtowers in Ganish village,
- Baltit Fort on top of Karimabad which was built by the Mirs about 800 years ago and is a historic landmark for Hunza, and
- Altit Fort (at the bottom of the valley).

Hiking treks include Ondra Poygah Gulmit and Leopard Trek Shiskhat. The valley is popularly believed to be one of the inspiration for the mythical valley of Shangri-La in James Hilton's 1933 novel, Lost Horizon.

=== Valleys ===
It contains several sub-valleys such as:

- Hopar Valley
- Naltar Valley
- Chalt Valley
- Hispar Valley
- Sas Valley
- Sumayar Valley
- Daiter Valley
- Gappa Valley

=== Meadows and pastures ===
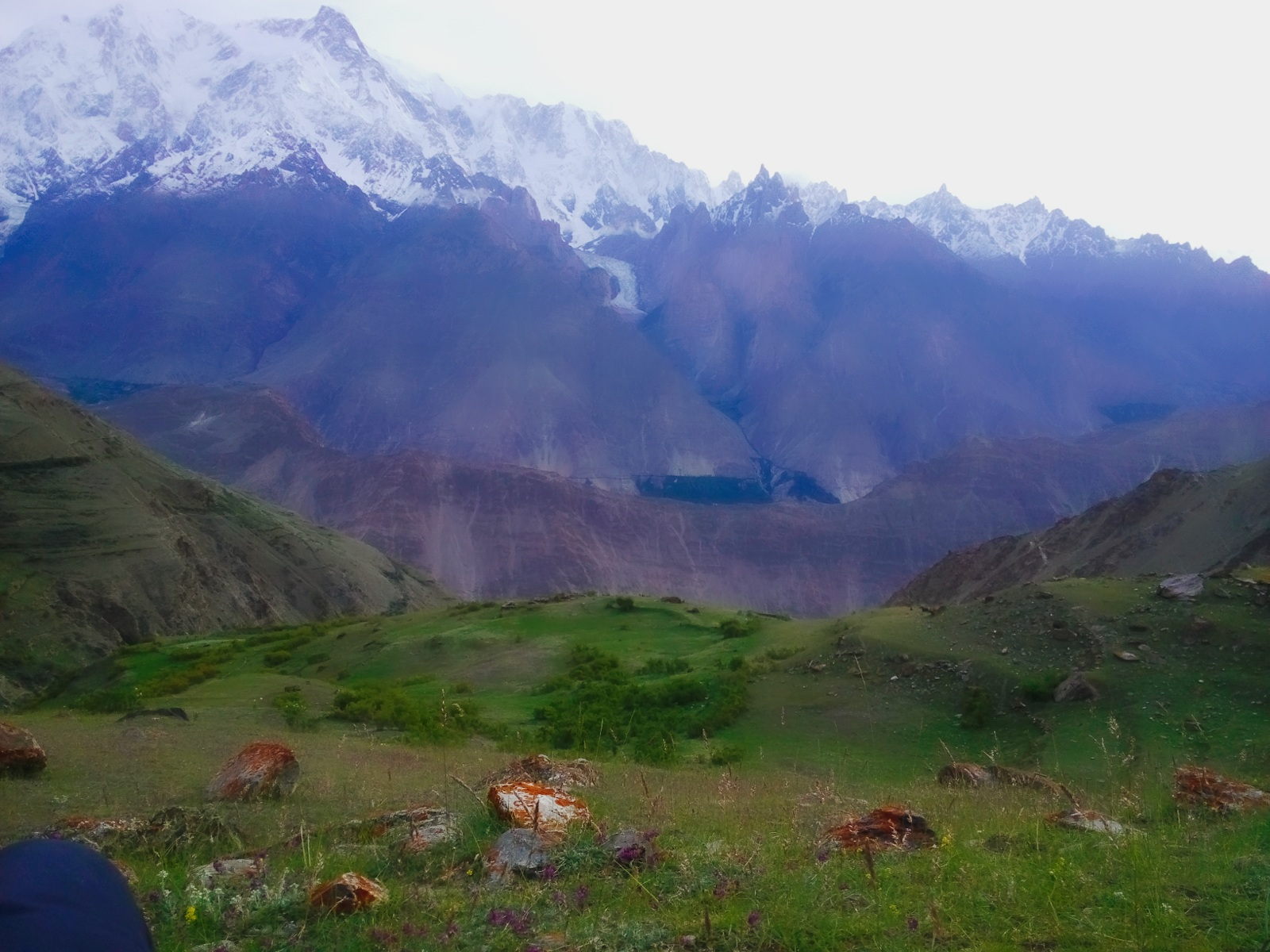
Bar Ter meadows

The meadows in Hunza Valley include:

- Kacheli
- Taghafari
- Thayngi
- Barkot
- Bar Ter
- Tadakh
- Barpu
- Hamder
- Sumayar Bar
- Sumayar Teir
- Silkiyang
- Hapakun

=== Mountain peaks ===
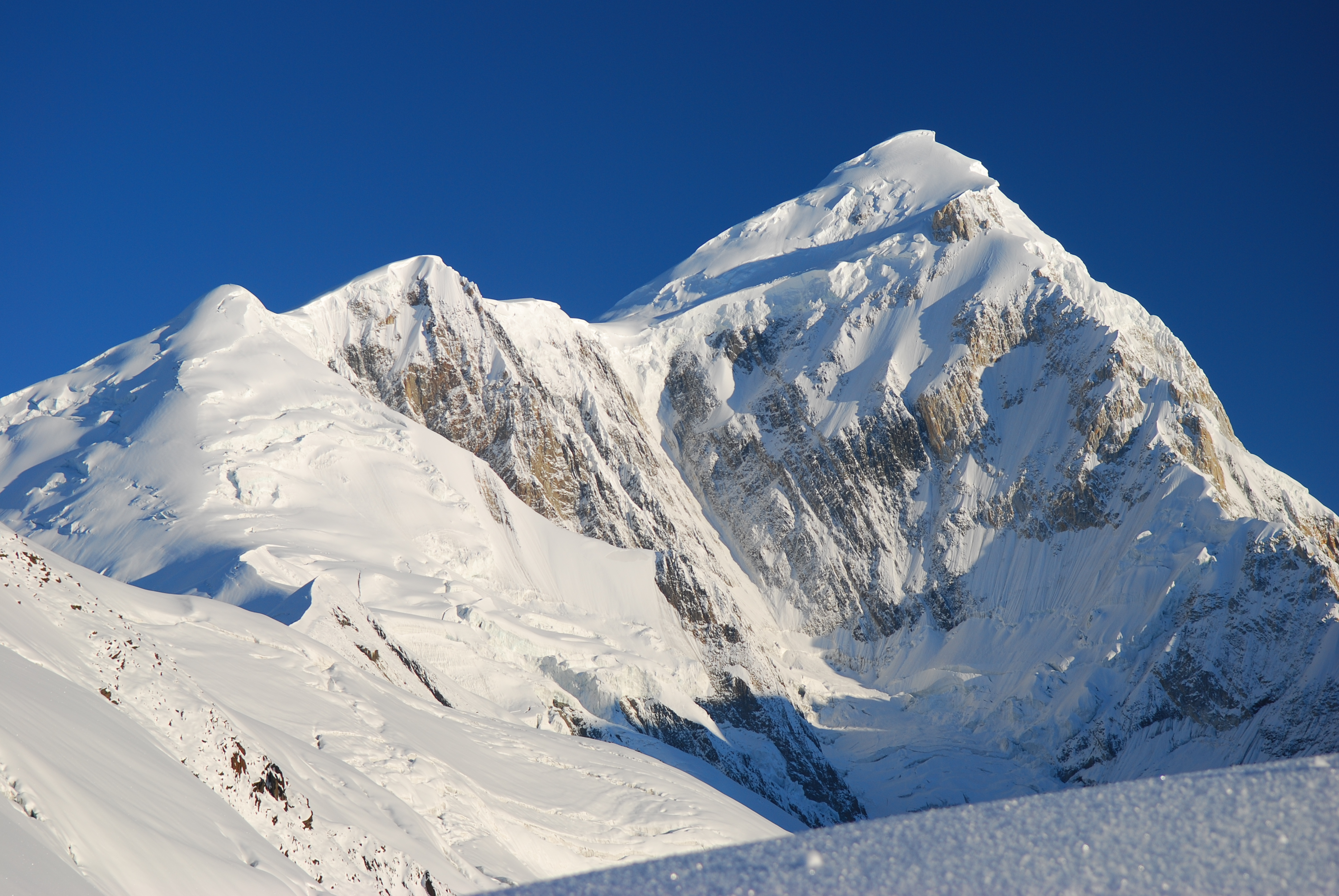
Golden Peak, Hispar Valley

The valley is also home of several mountains, including:

- Distaghil Sar 7,885 m
- Batura
- Batura II
- Batura III
- Muchu Chhish
- Shispare
- Passu Sar
- Kanjut Sar
- Yukshin Gardan Sar
- Pumari Chhish
- Momhil Sar
- Ultar Sar 7,388 m (24,239 ft),
- Bojahagur Duanasir II 7,329 m (24,045 ft)
- Ghenta Peak 7,090 m (15,631 ft)
- Hunza Peak 6,270 m (20,571 ft)
- Darmyani Peak 6,090 m (19,980 ft)
- Bublimating (Ladyfinger Peak), about 6,000 m (20,000 ft)
- Rakaposhi 7,788 m
- Diran Peak 7,265 m
- Golden Peak 7,027 m
- Diran
- Kapel Peak (Bawalter Peak)
- Miar Peak (Miar Chhish)
- Shiltar Peak
- Alchori Sar
- Hispar Sar
- Kunyang Chhish
- Malubiting
- Silkiyang Peak

=== Lakes ===
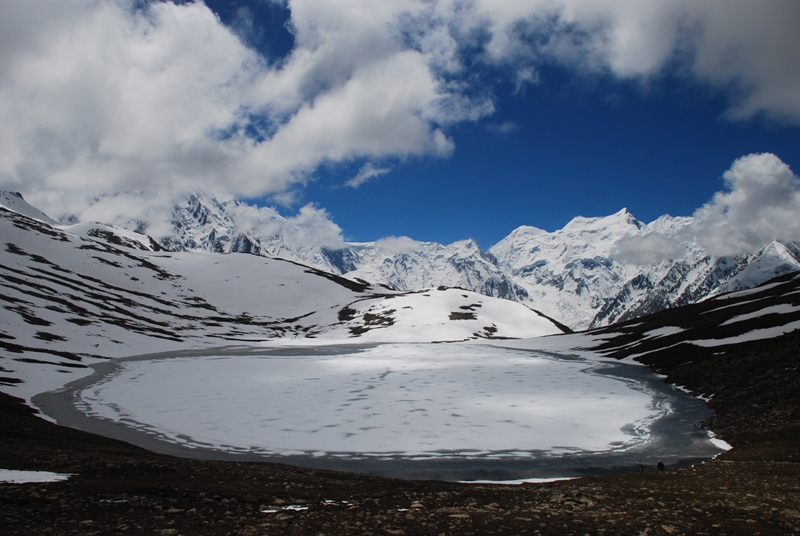
Rush Lake, Hoper Valley

Hunza also houses several lakes in its vicinity including:

- Attabad Lake
- Borith Lake
- Shimshal Lakes
- Hassanabad Lake
- Naltar Lakes
- Rush Lake
- Snow Lake
- Kacheli Lake

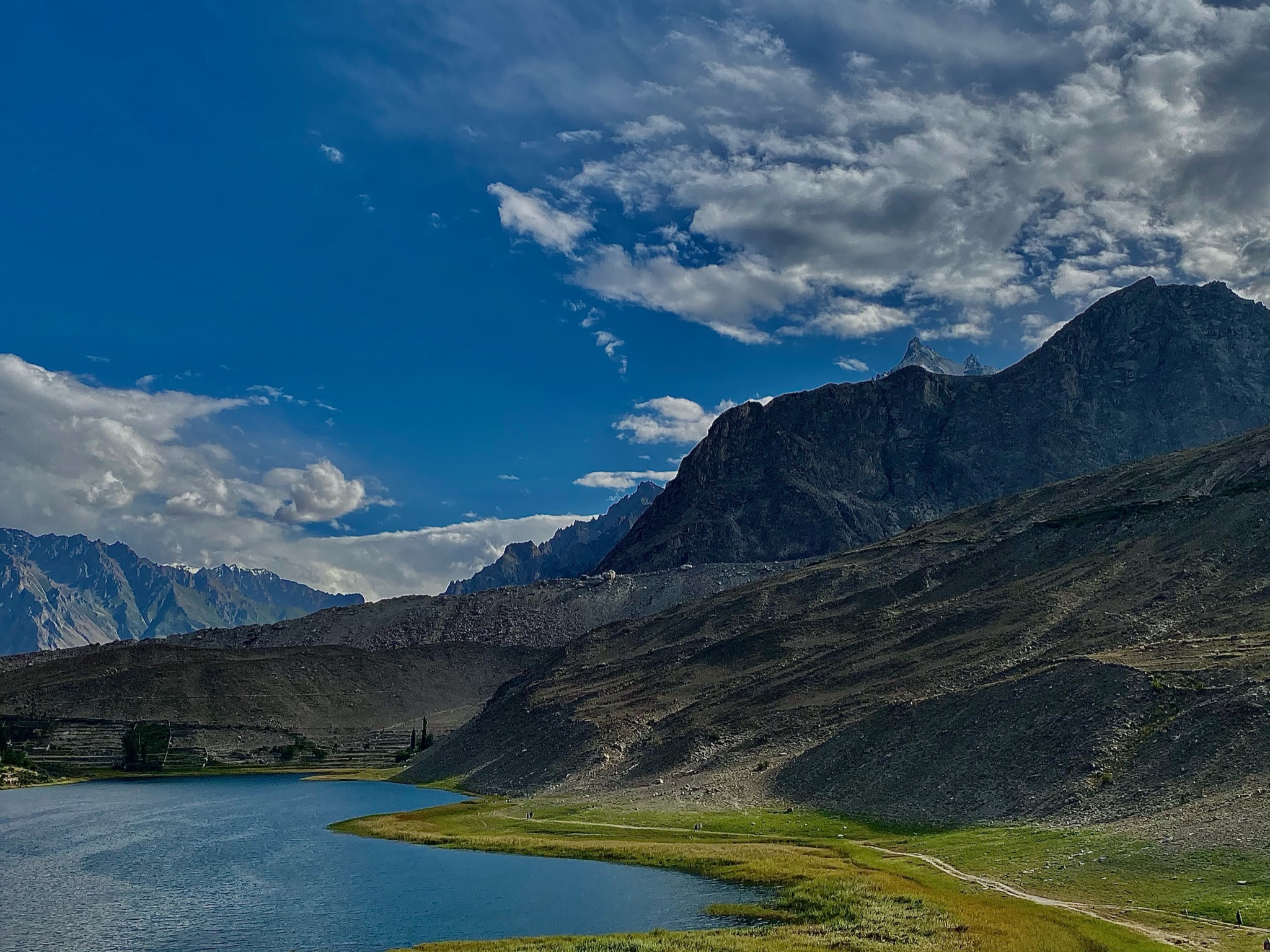
A view of Borith Lake in summer

=== Glaciers ===
Famous glaciers in the region are:

- Batura Glacier, the fifth-longest glacier in the world outside the polar region, and 57 km long
- Hopar Glacier
- Miar Glacier
- Hisper Glacier
- Biafo Glacier
- Barpu Glacier
- Minapin Glacier
- Pisan Glacier
- Silkiyang Glacier
- Summayar Glaciers
- Nilt Glacier
- Phomarikish Glacier, Hisper
- Khai Ghamoo, Hisper
- Darnchi Glacier, Hoper
- Ghander Chish Glacier, Hisper
- Hamder Glacier, Hoper
- Ghulmet Rakaposhi Glacier
- Thole Nala Glacier

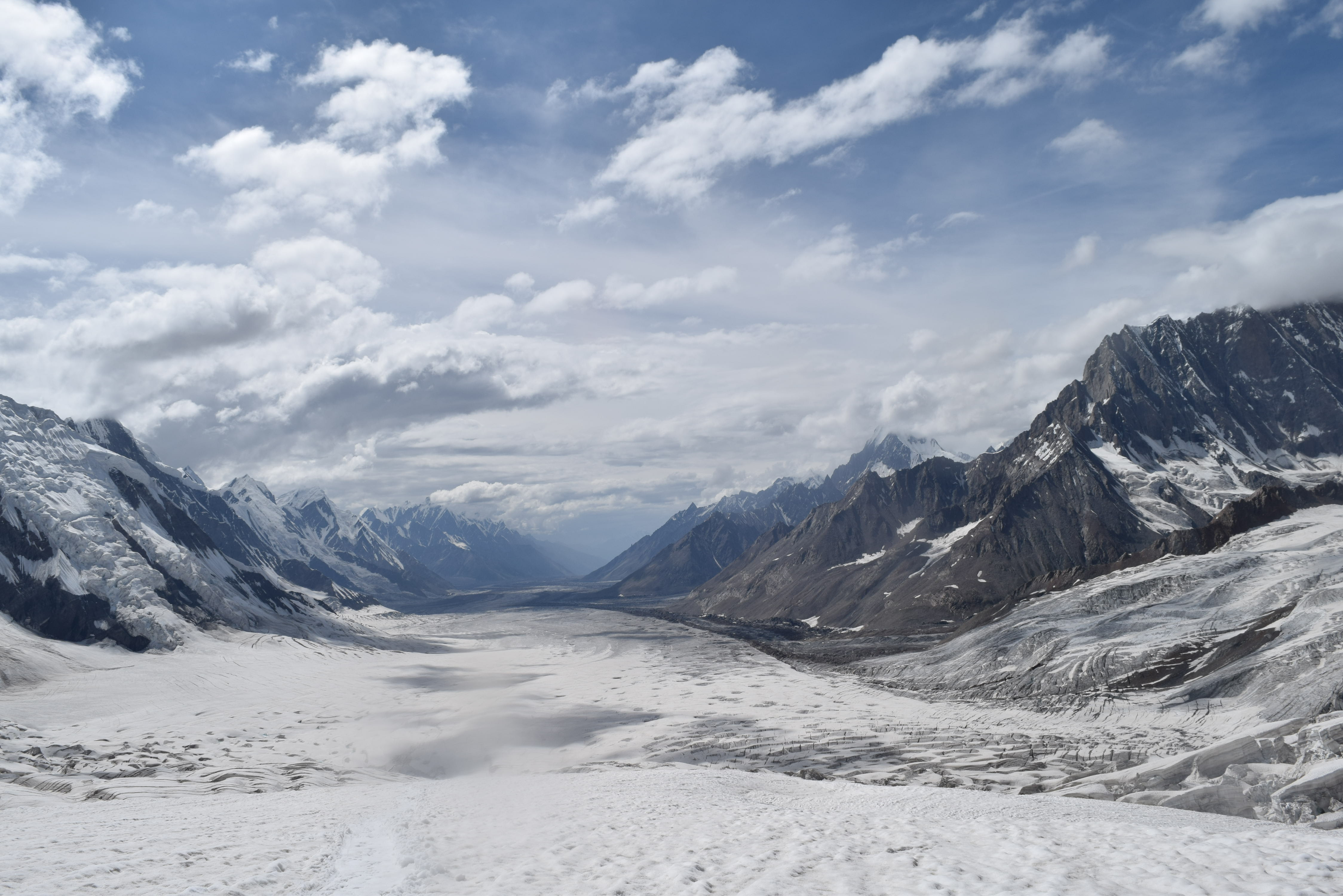
Snow Lake, Hispar Valley

=== Mountain passes ===
Passes into the valley include:

- Khunjerab Pass, standing at a height of 4,693 meters (over 15,000 feet above sea level), is the highest paved international border crossing in the world. Strategically located on Pakistan's northern border and China's southwest border.
- Hispar Pass also known as Hispar La
- Chaprot Pass
- Chumar Bakur Pass
- Daiter Pass/Daiter Pass between Naltat and Daiter
- Poland La Hoper to Arandu
- Khurdopin pass/Hisper to Shimshal
- Gapa pasas/Chaprote to Naltar Valley
- Ghaintur Pass/Hoper to Sumayar Valley
- C'hilbi (Ghulmet/Pissan Valley)

== Mines and Minerals ==
The valley is considered to be one of the most gemstone-rich valleys of Gilgit-Baltistan. It contains numerous mining sites that yield a range of precious and semiprecious gemstones.

=== Mining Sites ===
- Chumar Bakhoor, Sumayar
- Hapakun, Minapin
- Aquamarine mines in Phakker
- Marble and granite deposits in Pissan, Minapin, Nagar Khas, and Sumayar.

=== Minerals ===
- Aquamarine: Aquamarine is found in Chumar Bakhoor area of Sumayar and adjoining mountains of Phekar Nagar.
- Fluorite: Fluorite is found in Chumar Bakhoor area of Sumayar Nagar.
- Apatite: Apatite is found in Chumar Bakhoor along with Aquamarine and Fluorite summayar nagar.
- Jet (Gemstone): Jet deposits are found in various areas of Nagar District such as, Minapin, Chalt and Nagar Khas.
- Marble: Marble deposits are found in Pisan, Minapin, Nagar Khas and Sumayar regions of Nagar.

== Demographics ==
The local languages spoken include Burushaski, Wakhi and Shina. The literacy rate of the Hunza valley is more than 95%. The establishment of community schools that provide high quality education, and the influence of the Aga Khan Mirs, contributing towards building universities for higher education have directed towards the high literacy rate in Hunza Valley, especially for girls. The historical area of Hunza and present northern Pakistan has had, over the centuries, mass migrations, conflicts and resettling of tribes and ethnicities, of which the Shina people are the most prominent in regional history. People of the region have recounted their historical traditions down the generations. The Hunza Valley is also home to some Wakhi, who migrated there from northeastern Afghanistan beginning in the nineteenth century onwards. The majority of residents in Hunza belong to the Ismaili Shia sect. They believe that Aga Khan V is their religious figurehead and transcendent. He is also believed to be the biggest promotor and contributor towards the literacy success and overall well-being of the people of Hunza and the valley itself.

The longevity of Hunza people has been noted by some, but others refute this as a longevity myth promoted by the lack of birth records. There is no evidence that Hunza life expectancy is significantly above the average of poor, isolated regions of Pakistan. Claims of health and long life were almost always based solely on the statements by the local mir (king). An author who had significant and sustained contact with Burusho people, John Clark, reported that they were overall unhealthy.

However, whether or not their putative longevity is true, it is undoubtable that the Hunza people lead a healthy lifestyle along with a healthy diet. Many researchers have lived with the Hunza people to answer this mystery including Robert McCarrison who did not discover a single person with diseases such as cancer, stomach ulcers or appendicitis. The research shows that high levels of exercise due the landscape and geography allows for them to be active and agile which factors in with their longevity, along with consumption of apricot seeds and oils, and the glacier water which contains minerals.

== See also ==
- Bagrot Valley
- Shamanism in Hunza
