= Bojohagur Duanasir =

Mountain in Pakistan

- بوجوہاگور
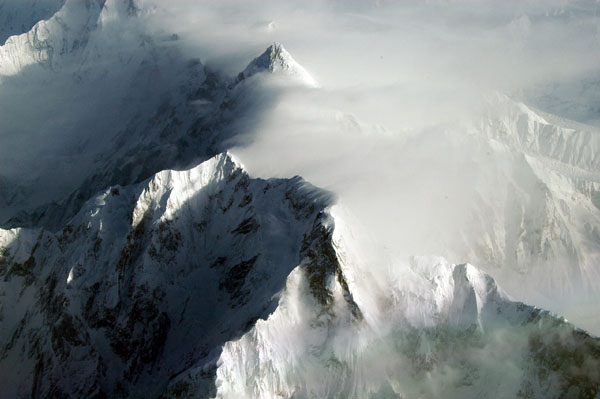
- Bojohagur Duanasir (left foreground) viewed from the southeast, with Ultar Sar (center foreground) and Shispare (center background).

Highest point
- Elevation: 7,329 m (24,045 ft)
- Prominence: 229 m (751 ft)
- Listing: Mountains of Pakistan
- Coordinates: 36°24′04″N 74°41′46″E

Geography
- Location within Pakistan
- Location: Hunza Valley, Gilgit-Baltistan, Pakistan
- Parent range: Karakoram, Batura

Climbing
- First ascent: 1984 by a Hiroshima Alpine Club（Japan

Bojohagur or Bojohaghur Duanasir (Urdu: بوجوہاگور) is a summit in the Batura Muztagh, a subrange of the Karakoram range in Gilgit-Baltistan, Pakistan. It is the west summit of a short ridge whose high point is Ultar Sar, also known as Bojohaghur Duanasir II (despite being higher). It lies about 10 km (6.2 mi) northeast of the Karimabad, a town on the Karakoram Highway in the Hunza Valley, part of the Hunza District of Gilgit-Baltistan.

It was first climbed in 1984 by E. Kisa, M. Nagoshi, and R. Okamoto, members of a Japanese expedition led by Tsumeo Omae, which ascended from the Hasanabad Glacier via the Southwest Ridge.

== Nearby peaks and glaciers ==
To the northwest of the Bojohaghur/Ultar massif is the huge pyramid of Shispare (7,611 m/24,970 ft). Along the southwest ridge of the massif are Hunza Peak and the striking rock spire of Ladyfinger Peak. The glaciers draining the slopes of the massif are (clockwise from north): the Ghulkin Glacier, the Gulmit Glacier, the Ahmad Abad Glacier, the Ultar Glacier, and the Hasanabad Glacier. (Many of these have other names as well.)

== See also ==
- Highest mountains of the world
