= Rahimabad, Gilgit-Baltistan =

Rahimabad Matumdass, رحیم آباد
- Village
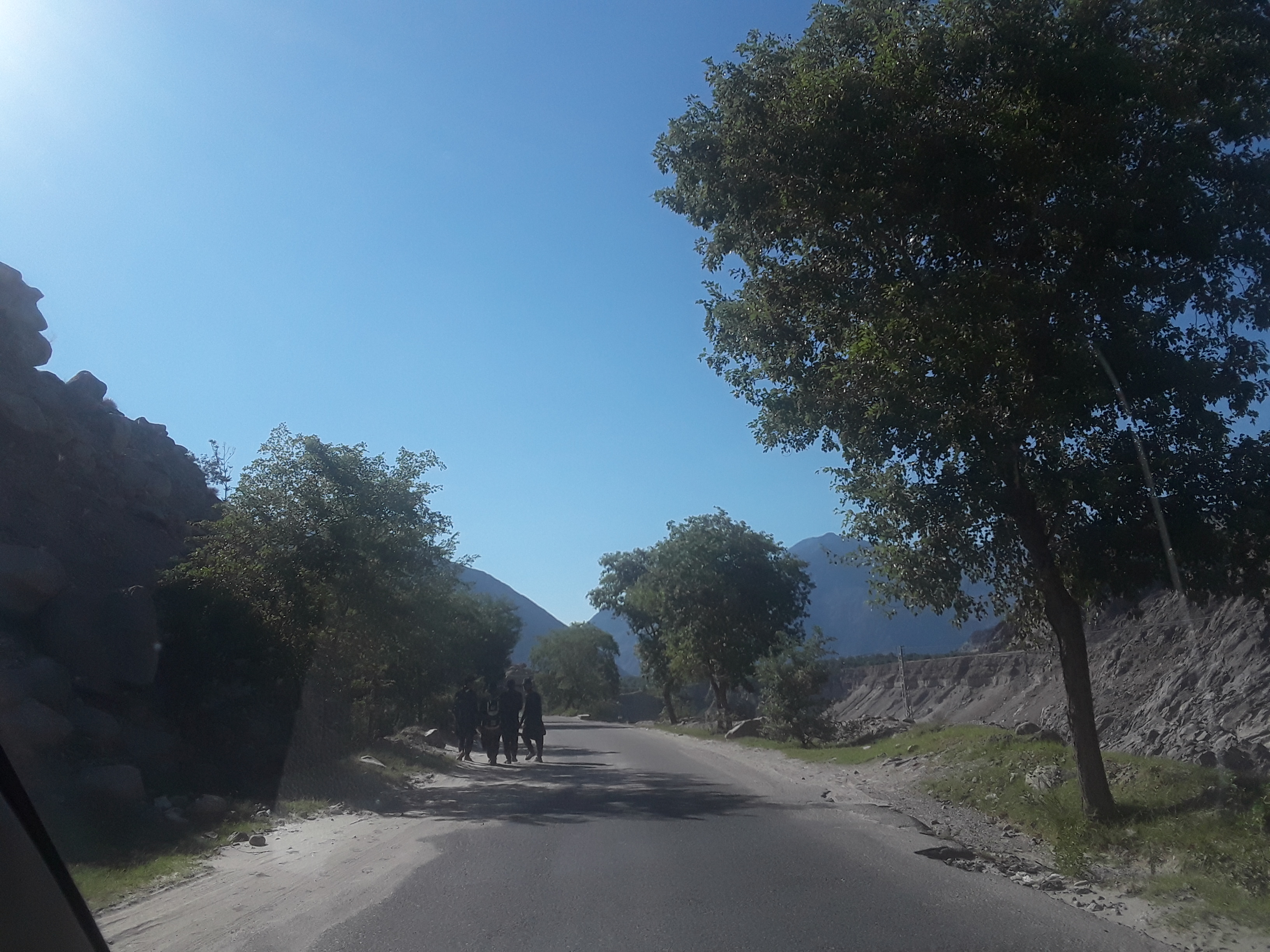
- Rahimabad

- Location within Gilgit Baltistan
- Coordinates: 36.12281659579713°N 74.29769026586975°E
- Country: Pakistan
- Territories of Pakistan: Gilgit-Baltistan
- District: Gilgit
- Time zone: UTC+05:00 (PKT)

Rahimabad (Burushaski: رحیم آباد) is a hill station in Gilgit, Gilgit-Baltistan, Pakistan. It is known for its scenery and is situated along the Hunza River.

The village falls administratively under Tehsil Danyore in the Gilgit District.

== History ==
The earliest known name for the settlement was Partab Singh Pura, attributed to a Sikh ruler named Raja Partab Singh.

Over time the village became known as Matumdass, a term in the Brushaski language meaning “Dark Plain.” The modern name Rahimabad was adopted in honor of Aga Khan V, the spiritual leader of the Ismaili Muslim community.

== Demographics, People and Culture ==
The residents of Rahimabad are primarily speakers of the local language Burushaski; many also speak Shina or related local dialects.

Many families in Rahimabad trace their origins to central Hunza, having migrated and brought their cultural heritage with them, blending it with the local environment.

The community life is marked by traditional mountain-valley lifestyles, with strong family and communal ties. Agriculture, small-scale trade, and other jobs contribute to a self-sufficient local society.

== Local Traditions and Oral Accounts ==
According to elders, Raja Partab Singh lived in the highlands known as Malchi, an area about 400 meters above the main settlement.

Malchi contains a small natural spring and has long been used as winter grazing land due to limited water availability. Although some parts are irrigated enough to allow small-scale cultivation, the land continues to be divided among different tribes. This reflects longstanding communal practices that have shaped local land use.
