= Kacheli Lake =

Lake in Pakistan

- Kachura Lake
- Location in Pakistan
- Interactive map of Kacheli Lake
- Location: Kacheli Meadows, Miacher Valley, Nagar District, Gilgit-Baltistan
- Coordinates: 36°11′54″N 74°35′25″E
- Type: Lake
- Basin countries: Pakistan
- Average depth: 70 metres (230 ft)
- Max. depth: 70 metres (230 ft)
- Surface elevation: 3,970 metres (13,020 ft)

Kacheli Lake is a high-altitude lake located in Kacheli Meadows in Miacher Valley of Nagar District, Gilgit-Baltistan, Pakistan. Climbing steeply from the Miachar Daman-e-Koh base camp, Kacheli Lake can be reached in about two hours on foot. Kacheli Lake lies across the Minapin glacier.

== See also ==
- Diran
- Rakaposhi
- Nagar Valley
