= Muchu Chhish =

Mountain in Pakistan

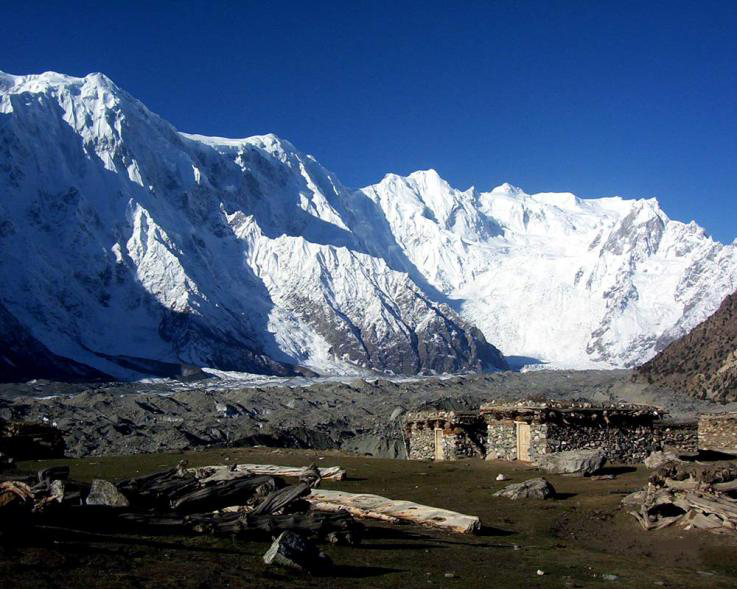
- Muchu Chhish is directly above the left side of the small structure as seen from the Batura Valley. The image has annotations visible by scrolling mouse over peaks at this link.

Highest point
- Elevation: 7,453 m (24,452 ft)
- Prominence: 263 m (863 ft)
- Coordinates: 36°30′08″N 74°33′20″E

Geography
- Location within Pakistan Location within Asia
- Location: Hunza Valley, Gilgit-Baltistan, Pakistan
- Parent range: Karakoram

Climbing
- First ascent: July 5, 2024 by Zdenek Hak, Radoslav Groh, and Jaroslav Bansky
- Easiest route: Technical

Muchu Chhish (7,453 metres (24,452 ft)) is a mountain in the Batura Muztagh sub-range of the Karakoram in Hunza Valley, in Gilgit-Baltistan, Pakistan. Located in a very remote and inaccessible region, only a handful of attempts have been made to reach the summit. Muchu Chhish was one of the tallest unclimbed mountains on Earth, until its successful summit in 2024 by a three-member Czech team. The peak has a modest prominence however, rising only 263 m (863 ft) above the nearest col or pass. The Batura Glacier, one of the longest outside the polar regions, flanks Muchu Chhish to the north.

Muchu Chhish lacks any well-defined northern or southern ridges of its own and is nearly impassable from the north due to glacial icefall; most expeditions thus attempt it via the South Ridge of 7,462 m (24,482 ft) Batura VI to the immediate west. This ridge was climbed by a Polish expedition in 1983 using fixed ropes while making the first ascent of 7,531 m (24,708 ft) Batura V and VI. One attempt was by a Spanish expedition in 1999, which reached 6,650 m (21,820 ft) on the south ridge. In 2020, a three-member Czech expedition, including climber Pavel Kořínek and former politician Pavel Bém, made an attempt, but they did not reach the top due to bad weather. The same climbers tried again in 2021, but that attempt failed due to excessive amounts of snow on the ridge.

== First ascent ==
A Czech team consisting of Zdenek Hak, Radoslav Groh, and Jaroslav Bansky reached the summit of Muchu Chhish on July 5, 2024 after a six-day climb. At the time of the summit, it was the highest unclimbed mountain in the Karakoram.

== See also ==
- Mountains of Pakistan
- Highest unclimbed mountain
