= Hopar Valley =

Valley in Gilgit-Baltistan, Pakistan

Hopper Valley
- وادی ہوپر
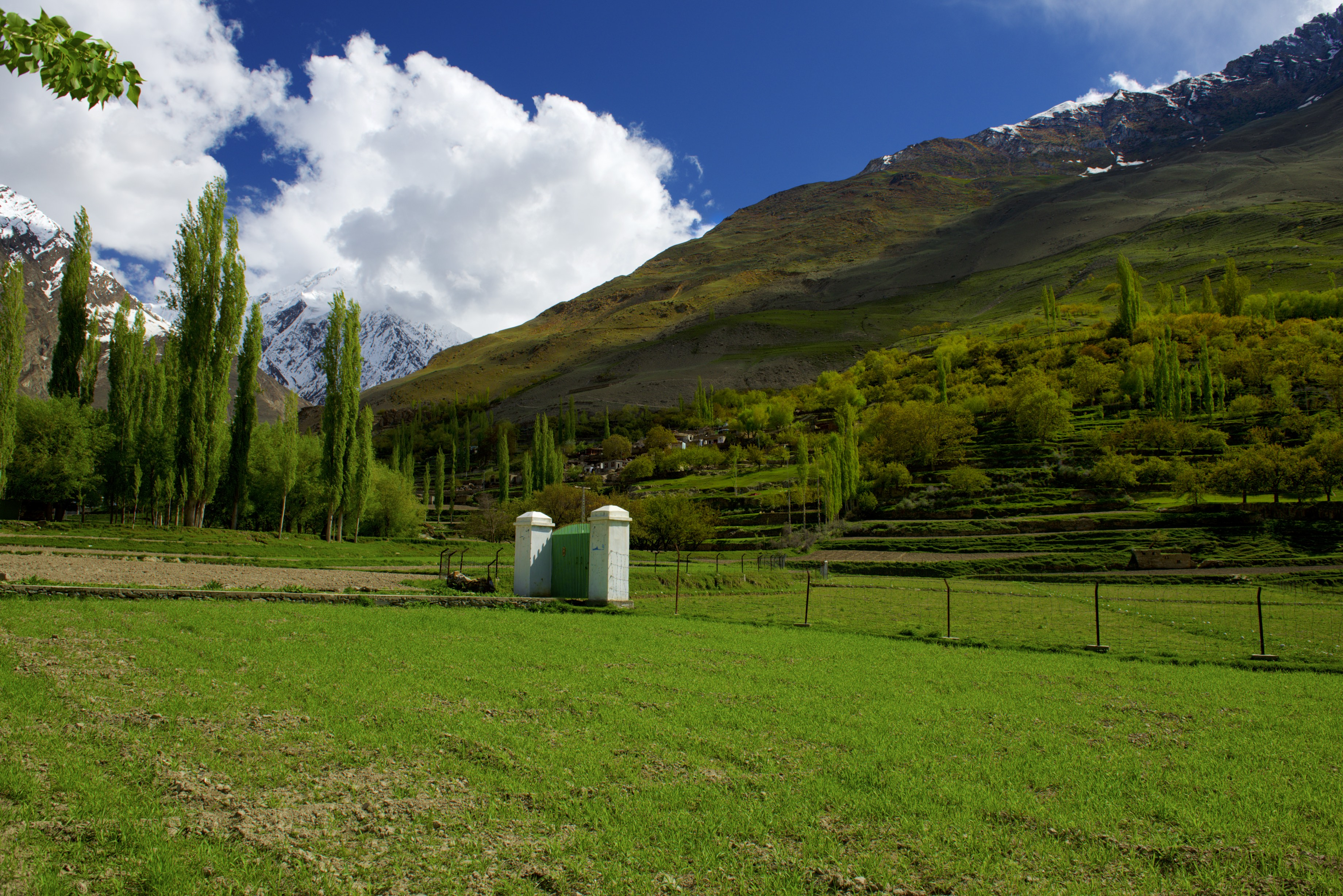

Geography
- Population centers: Hakalshall, Ratal, Broshall, Holshall and Ghoshoshall
- Borders on: Hunza Valley; Gojal Valley

The Hopper Valley (Urdu: وادی ہوپر), also spelled Hopar Valley, is a section of the Nagar Valley in Gilgit-Baltistan, Pakistan. It is situated approximately 10 km from Nagar Khas, the main city of the Nagar Valley. Hopper Valley is known for the Spantik and Hopper glaciers.

== Geographical features ==
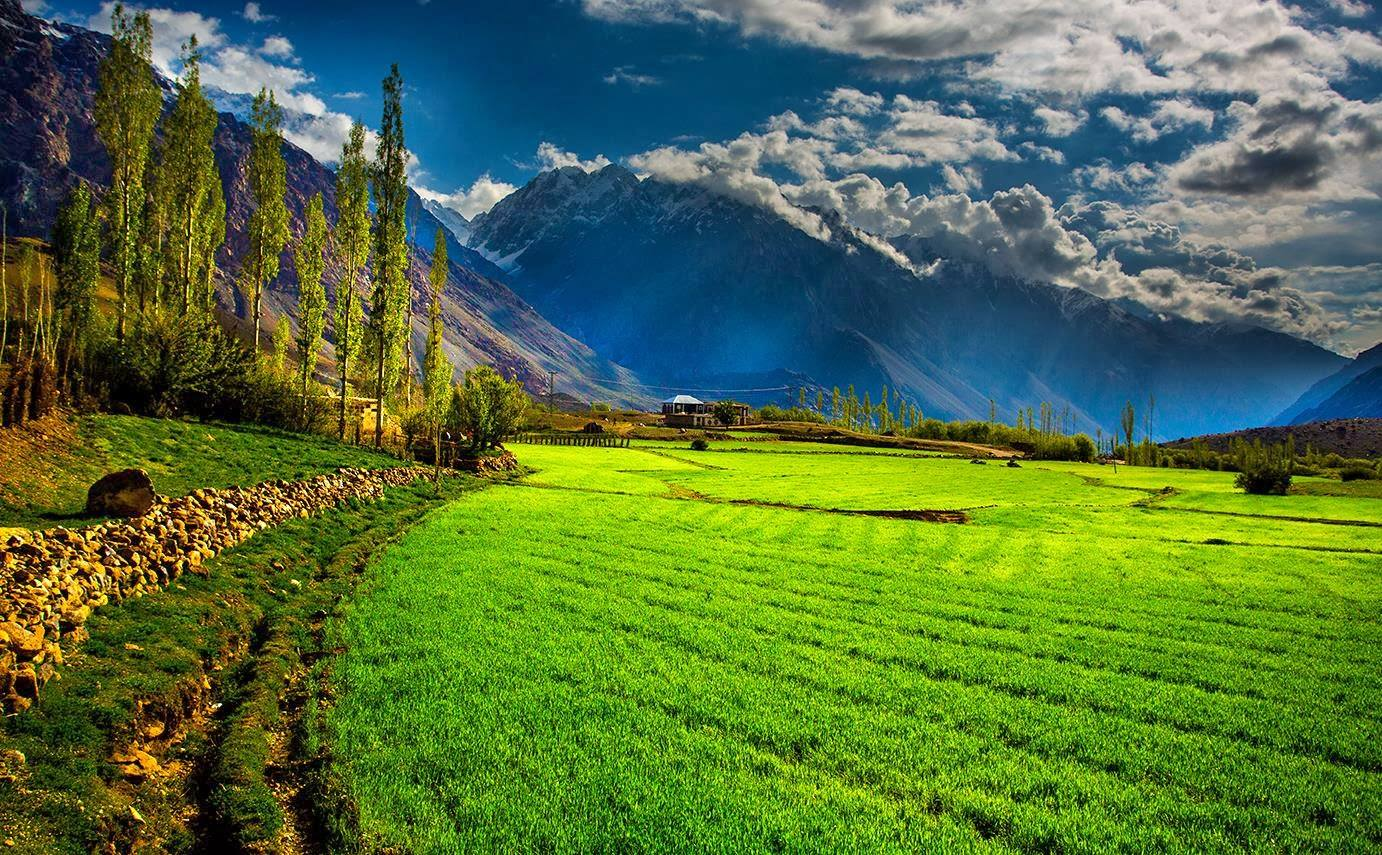
Hopper Valley

Hopper Valley consists of a group of villages within a natural bowl formation along a bend of the Baltoro Glacier. Across from Hopper, there is a white Bualtar Glacier meeting the Barpu Glacier. This region serves as a base camp for treks into the lofty, glacier-covered peaks known as the Hispar Muztagh range. The entire population residing in this valley speaks in the Burushaski language.

The valley has a number of natural formations, including glaciers, lakes, and high mountains.

=== Glaciers ===
There are five glaciers in the valley:

1. Hoper glacier
2. Barpu glacier
3. Miar glacier
4. Daranci glacier
5. Geentur or Supulter glacier

=== Lakes ===
'Rush Lake Hoper' is the most visited tourist destination in the valley. Rush Lake Hoper is situated in Hoper valley Nagar District Gilgit Baltistan, Pakistan. It is located at the middle of Rush Peak, at over 4,694 meters. Rush Lake is one of the highest alpine lakes in the world. It is 2nd highest elevated lake in South Asia. In the surrounding area are green pastures - which support local domesticated and wild animals. This includes local animals like goats, yaks and sheep, and wild animals like Himalayan ibex, retch, fox and snow leopard. The Pakistan National Bird, chakour, is also found.

=== Mountains ===
The valley is home to many high mountains such as the Golden Peak or Spantik (7027 m), Bawalter Peak(7126;m) (from where Hoper glacier starts), Rush Peak and Miar Peak (7257 m) while the other series of mountains view from Rush Peak like K2, Passu Peak, Diran Peak, and Rakaposhi.

=== Seasons ===
The spring season starts from April and ends by June. From July to September, there is summer season and autumn arrives in October. From November to March, it is winter time and during this period there is huge snowfall.

== See also ==
- Biafo Glacier
- Diran
- Hispar Valley
- Nagar Valley
- Rakaposhi
- Rush Lake
- Spantik
- State of Nagar

Hoper Glacier Nagar
