= Nagar District =

District in Pakistan-administered Gilgit-Baltistan

Nagar District ضلع نگر
- District of Gilgit-Baltistan administered by Pakistan
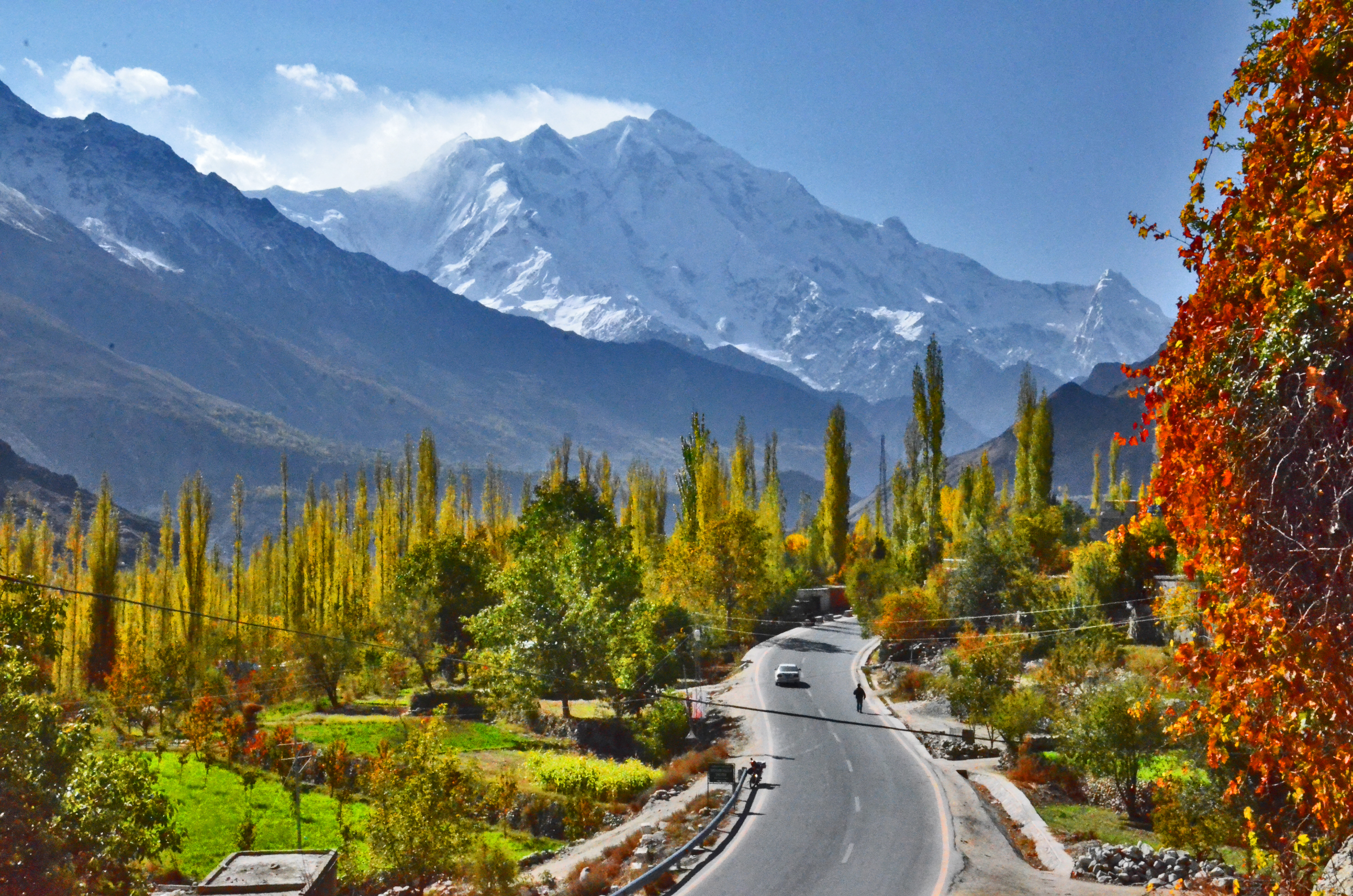
- A view of Rakaposhi from the Nagar Valley
- Interactive map of Nagar district
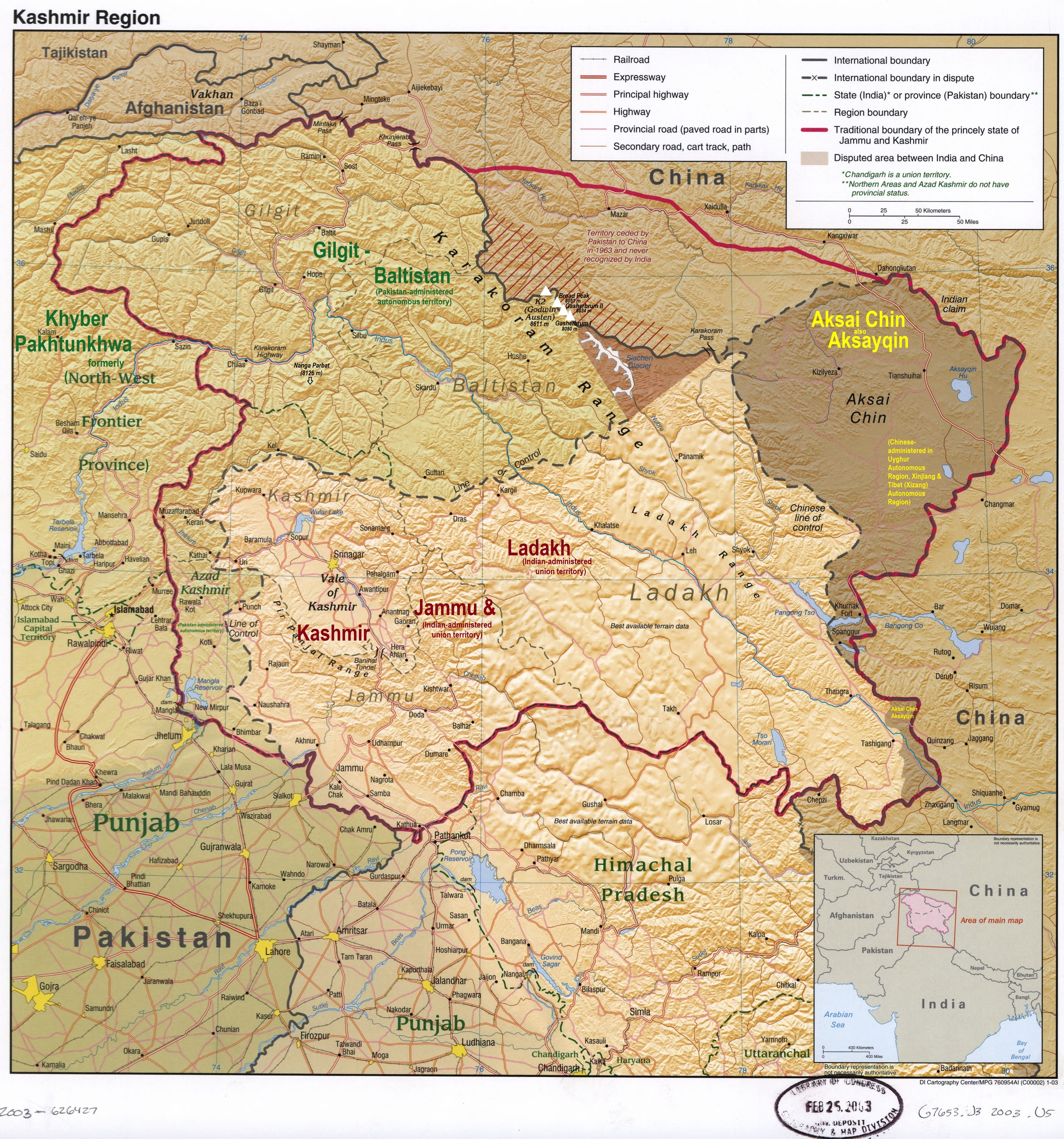
- A map showing Pakistani-administered Gilgit-Baltistan (shaded in sage green) in the disputed Kashmir region
- Coordinates (Nagarkhas): 36.2764°N 74.72°E
- Administering country: Pakistan
- Territory: Gilgit-Baltistan
- Division: Gilgit Division
- Established: 2015
- Headquarters: Harespo

Government
  - Type: District Administration

Area
  - Total: 4,137 km^{2} (1,597 sq mi)

Population (2023)
  - Total: 87,410
  - Density: 21.13/km^{2} (54.72/sq mi)
- Number of tehsils: 3

Nagar District (Urdu: ضلع نگر) is a district in the Pakistani-administered Gilgit-Baltistan, in the larger disputed Kashmir region. Nagar District was established in 2015 by the division of the into two districts: the Nagar District and the Hunzu District.

== Geography ==
The Nagar District largely coincides with Nagar Valley. It is bounded on the north and north-east by the Hunza District, on the south-east by the Shigar District, on the south by the Gilgit District, and on the west by the Ghizer District. The district headquarters in the town of Nagarkhas. Overall less than 10% of the district is covered by alpine and winter pastures while 87% of land is either barren or permanently snow covered.

== History ==
Nagar was historically a princely state, ruled by a branch of Trakhān dynasty of Gilgit. It acceded to Pakistan in 1947 following the Gilgit Rebellion. The state was abolished in 1972 and converted to a subdivision of Gilgit District. Hunza-Nagar District was established in 2008, later bifurcated into Hunza and Nagar districts in 2015.

== Administration ==
Map of Gilgit-Baltistan with the Nagar District highlighted in red

The District Nagar administratively comprises three Tehsils, Tehsil Nagar-I and Tehsil Nagar-II. and Tehsil Shenbar/Chalt. All the villages of Uyum Nager or upper Nagar including Shayar, Askurdas, Sumayar, Nagarkhas, Hoper Valley, and Hispar come under the Tehsil Nagar-I. While all the villages of lower Nagar including Bar, Chalt, Buladas, Chaprote, Skandarabad, Jafarabad, Nilt, Thol, Masoot, Yal, Ghulmet, Pisan, Minapin, Meacher, Dadhimal, Phekar, and Hakuchar are the par of Tehsil Nagar-II.

== Political representation ==
At the provincial level, the district is represented by two elected members to Gilgit-Baltistan Legislative Assembly according to the following constituencies:

- GBLA-4 (Nagar-II)
- GBLA-5 (Nagar-I)

== See also ==
- Chalt Valley
- Nagar Valley
- Hopar Valley
- Sumayar Valley
- Hisper Valley
- Gilgit District
