= Nagarkhas =

Nagarkhas نگرخاص
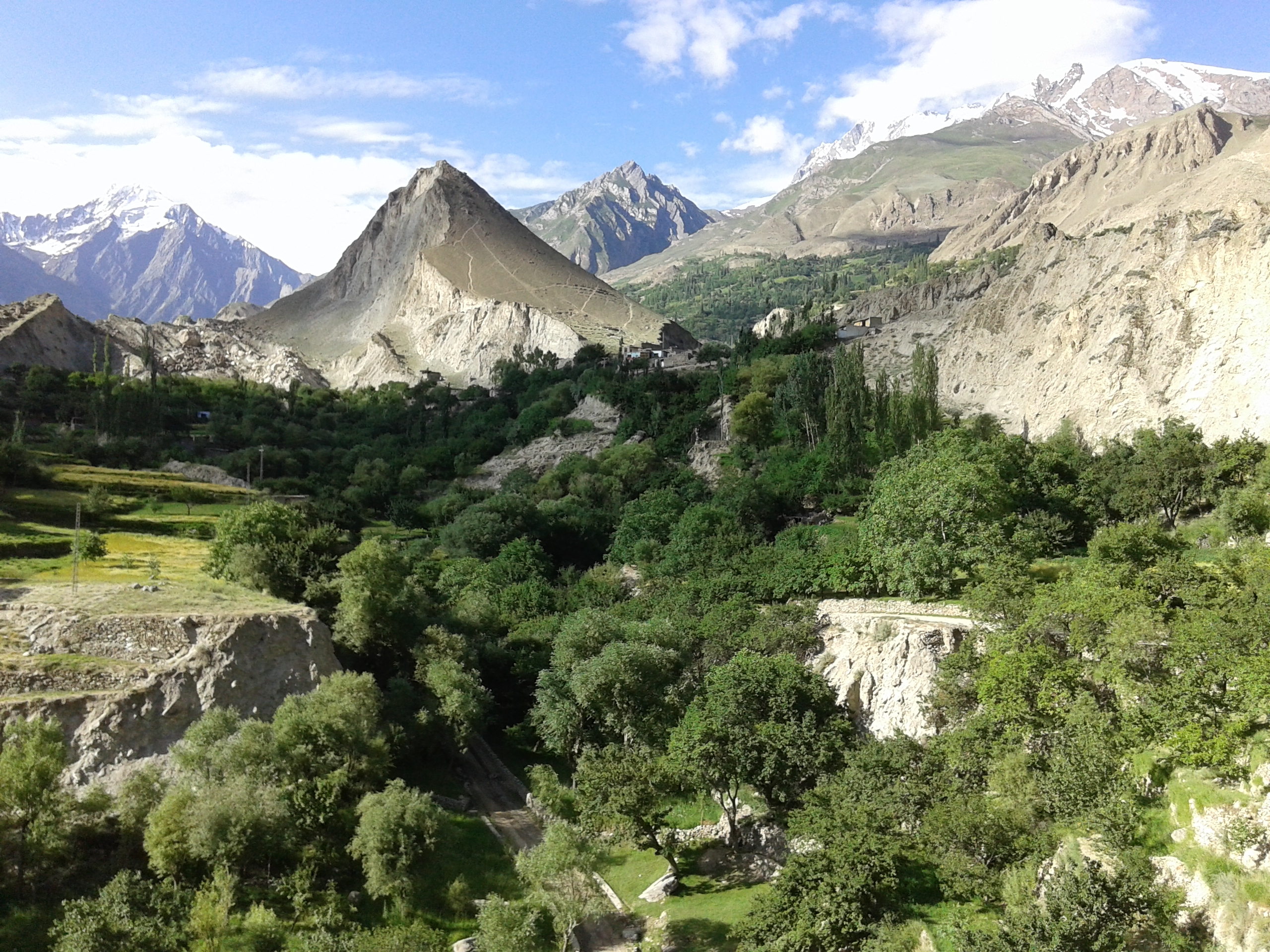
- Nagarkhas
- Interactive map of Nagarkhas
- Location within Gilgit Baltistan Location within Pakistan
- Coordinates: 36.2764°N 74.72°E
- Sovereign state: Pakistan
- Dependent territory: Gilgit–Baltistan
- District: Nagar District
- Elevation: 2,688 m (8,819 ft)

Nagarkhas (Urdu: نگرخاص), also known as Oyum-Nagar, serves as the administrative center for the Nagar District in Gilgit–Baltistan region of Pakistan and is one of the main towns of the district. Located along the Nagar River, this town also held the distinction of being the capital of the erstwhile princely state of Nagar.

Today, the renowned Karakoram Highway traverses through Nagar, establishing a crucial connection between Pakistan and China via the Khunjerab Pass. This roadway traces the course of the Hunza-Nagar River for a portion of its journey, passing through Nagar and extending into the Hunza District.

== Location ==
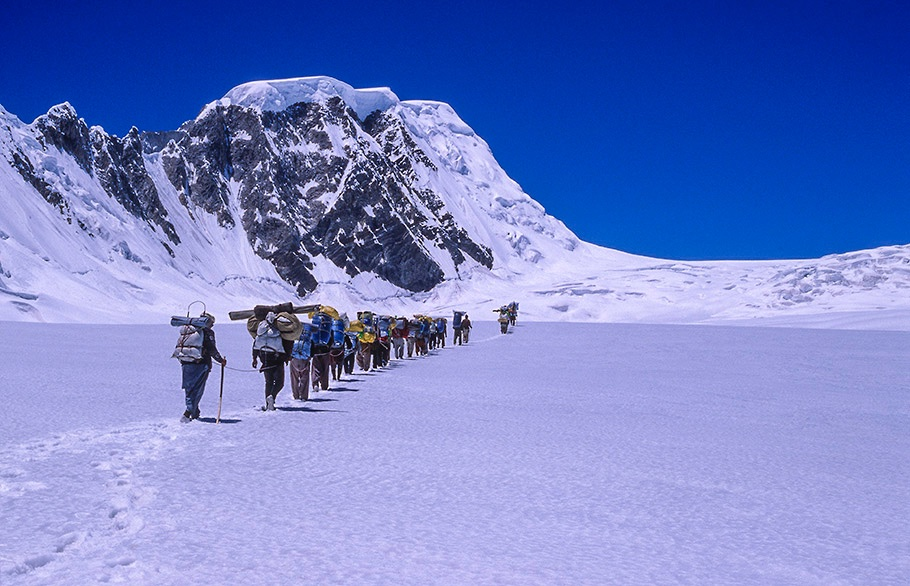
Hisper Biafo Glacier

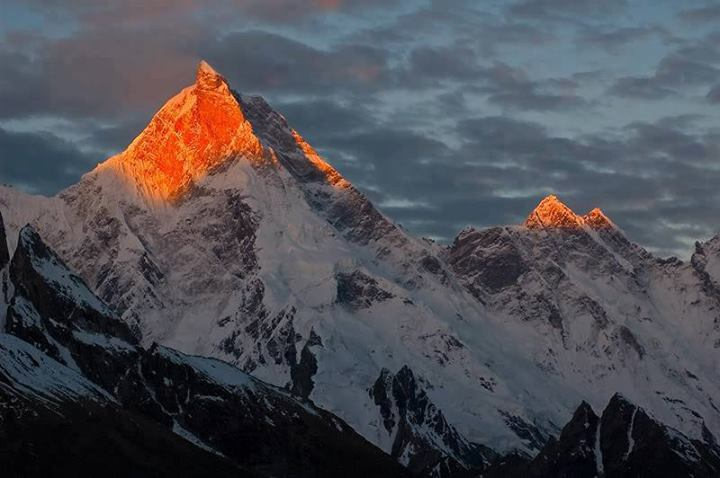
Rakaposhi Peak

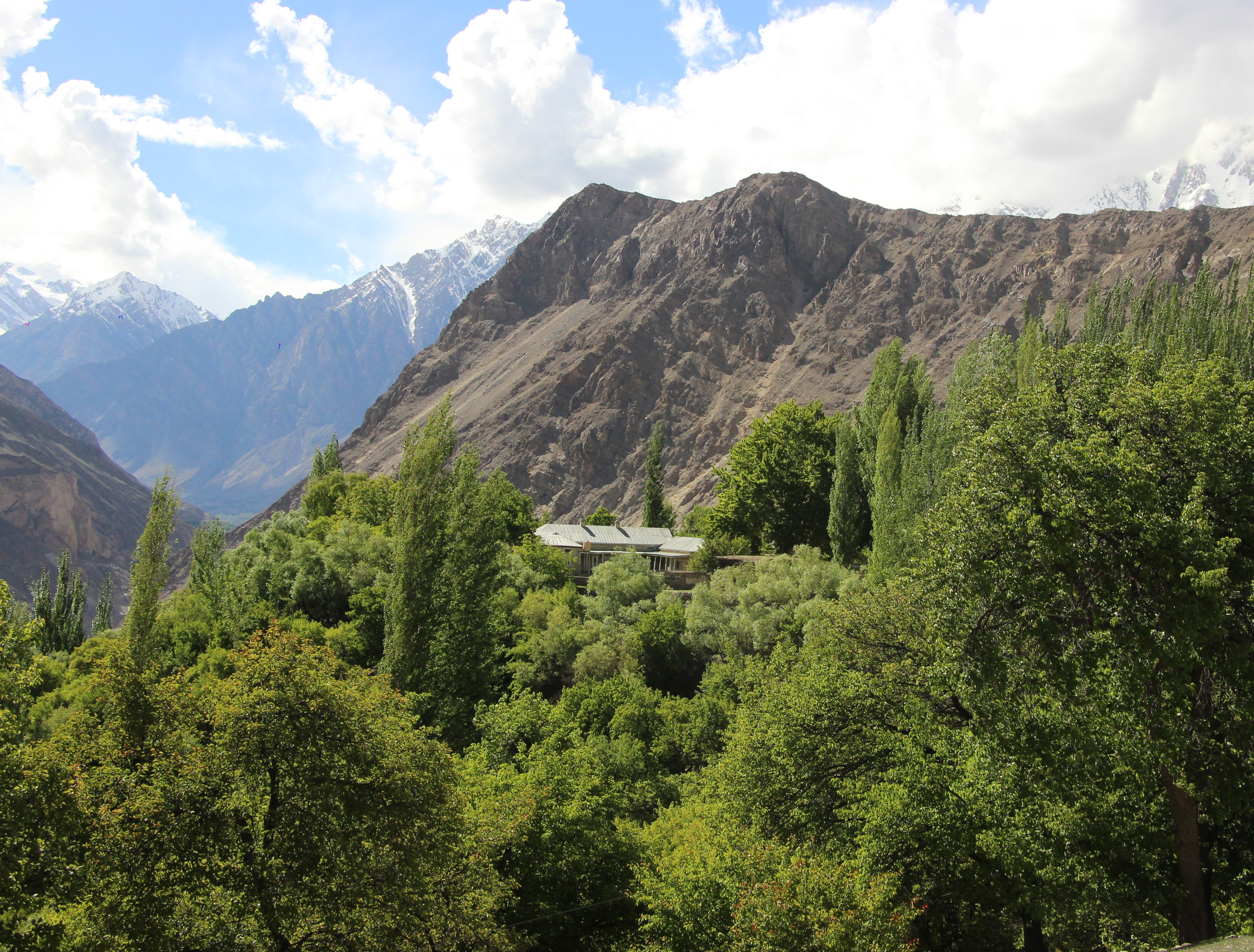
The royal palace in Nagarkhas

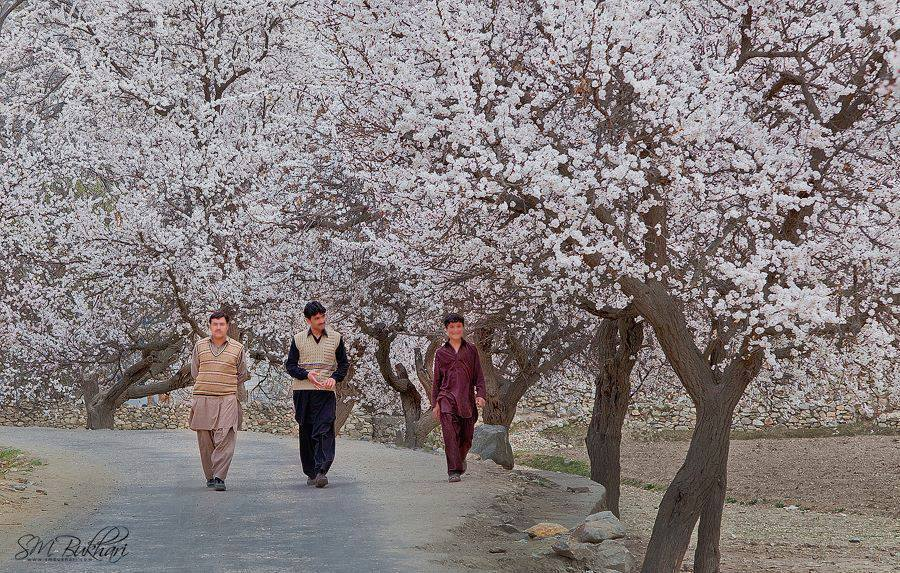
The Nagar Valley in spring

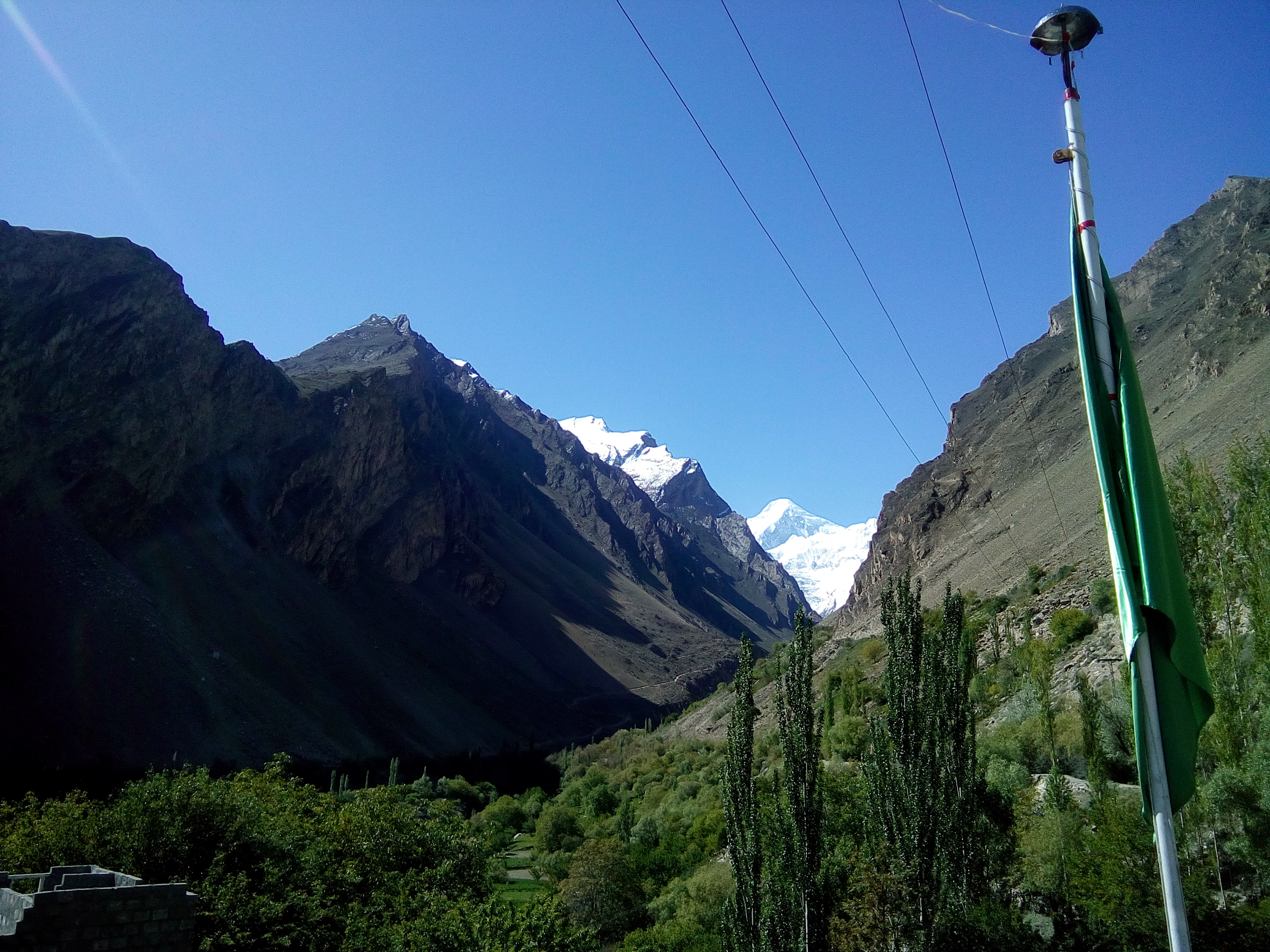
The Sumayyar Valley in Nagar District

Nagar is situated within the Nagar River valley, approximately five miles southeast of the junction where the Nagar River meets the Hunza River, and is positioned just below Baltit.

The Nagar Valley, historically known as Broshal, is situated at an elevation of 2,688 meters (8,822 feet). Nagarkhas, the primary town, also served as the capital of the former princely state of Nagar. Within the Nagar District, the Ghulmet, Minapin, BAR, Chaprote, and Hopper Valleys are renowned tourist destinations due to their breathtaking landscapes. The district is home to some of the world's most imposing high mountain peaks, including Rakaposhi at 7,788 meters (25,561 feet), Diran, the Spantik (also referred to as the Golden Peak), and several others.

== History ==
Following the Hunza-Nagar Campaign of 1889–1892 (known locally as the Anglo-Burusho war) the area came under British control and then became a vassal of the Kashmir durbar but continued to be ruled by the royal family of Nagar. In 1974, Zulfiqar Ali Bhutto dissolved the princely states of Nagar and Hunza and gave them democratic representation in the Northern Areas Council, now known as the Gilgit-Baltistan Legislative Assembly. The British wanted to expand trade with Russia from both Nagar and Hunza, but the states would not permit them to do so.

== Bibliography ==
- Nicolaus, Peter (2015), "The Taming of the Fairies", in Uwe Bläsing; Victoria Arakelova; Matthias Weinreich (eds.), Studies on Iran and The Caucasus: In Honour of Garnik Asatrian, BRILL, pp. 225–, ISBN 978-90-04-30206-8
