= Thomas A. Mutch =

American geologist and planetary scientist

Thomas Mutch
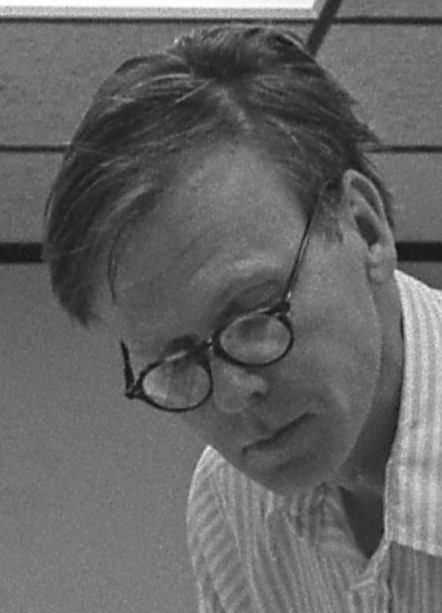
- Mutch in 1976
- Born: Thomas A. "Tim" Mutch; August 26, 1931; Rochester, New York
- Disappeared: October 6, 1980 (aged 49) disappeared during a descent from Mount Nun in the Kashmir Himalayas.
- Status: Missing for 45 years, 4 months and 23 days

Thomas A. (Tim) Mutch (August 26, 1931 – October 6, 1980) was an American geologist and planetary scientist and mountain climber. He was a professor at Brown University beginning in 1960 and was on leave from Brown serving as Associate Administrator of Space Science at NASA at the time of his death in 1980. He disappeared during descent from Mount Nun in the Kashmir Himalayas.

== Biography ==
Tim Mutch was a mountain climber and planetary scientist; he began mountain climbing in the 1950s in the Tetons and subsequently British Columbia where he made the first ascent of Mount Arjuna and in the Canadian Rockies where he made the first ascent of Eiffel Peak. In 1955 he went with Joseph Murphy to Pakistan where the two ascended Istor-o-Nal (elevation 24,288 feet) in the Hindu Kush, believing that they were the first to summit this peak. In later years, as other climbers ascended Istor-o-nal it became unclear if the summit they reached had been the highest.

While a professor at Brown University he published books regarding the geology of the Moon (Geology of the Moon: A Stratigraphic View, published 1973) and of Mars (The Geology of Mars, published 1977) and also taught courses on exploration, where he'd once led a group of Brown students in climbing the Himalayan peak Devistan, and geology. He was head of the Viking surface photography team on its mission to Mars in 1976. He is quoted as commenting on the first pictures: "This is just an incredible scene. It truly is. Nothing before or after can compare. It is transparent, brilliant, boundless. An explorer would understand. We have stood on the surface of Mars."

At the time of his disappearance in 1980 he was on leave from Brown and serving as Associate Administrator of Space Science at NASA in Washington DC.

== Legacy ==
A crater on Mars was named in his honor, and the Viking 1 lander was formally renamed "Thomas A. Mutch Memorial Station" on January 7, 1981, by then NASA Administrator, Robert A. Frosch; the engineering model currently displayed in the Smithsonian Institution has a small plaque beside it commemorating this, and a note that it will be left with the actual lander when circumstances permit. The Thomas "Tim" Mutch Memorial Fund was established in 1981 by his family and friends.

== See also ==
- List of people who disappeared mysteriously: post-1970
