= Ak Toba =

Ak Toba Āhandara, Āhangarhā
- Location in Afghanistan
- Coordinates: 36°52′N 68°38′E
- Country: Afghanistan
- Province: Kunduz Province

Ak Toba is the name of a village and settlement in Afghanistan on the Kunduz River, 3 miles upstream of Kunda Guzar and about 32 miles southwest of Hazrat-i-Imam. The resident population of 50 families was, as of the beginning of the 20th century, largely Turkish.

== See also ==
- Kunduz Province
