= Ak Bolak =

Ak Bolak Āk Bōlāk
- Location in Afghanistan
- Coordinates: 36°45′N 69°47′E
- Country: Afghanistan
- Province: Takhar Province

Ak Bolak is a village in Afghanistan, located at the east end of the Lataband Pass. It was described in the early years of the 20th century as being a thriving place, and as having a number of salt mines in the vicinity.
