= Darmodar Aghost Pass =

Mountain pass in Pakistan

- Interactive map of Darmodar Aghost Pass
- Elevation: 4,371 m (14,341 ft)

Third Approach
- Location: Pakistan
- Range: Hindukush Mountains
- Coordinates: 36°23′12″N 73°34′30″E

Darmodar Haghost Pass (el. 14,747 ft.) links Jundoli village, along the Gilgit River 10 km upstream from its confluence with the Iskhoman River, with Dal Sandhi in Yasin in Pakistan.
