= Tang-e Gharu =

Coordinates: 34°33′0″N 69°30′00″E

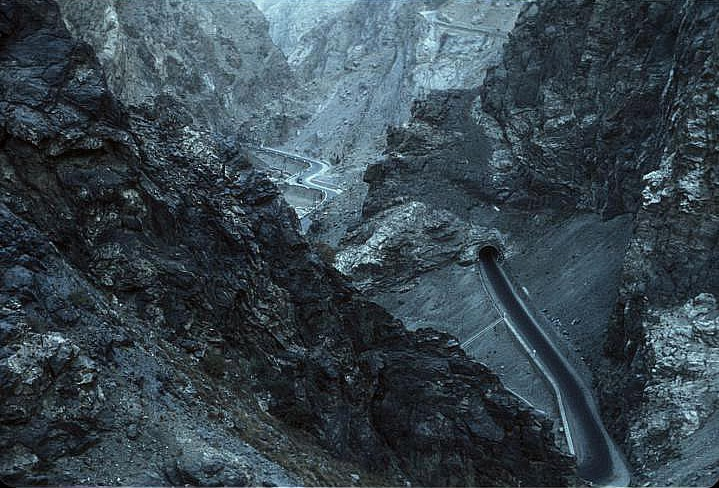
The Kabul–Jalalabad Road passes through the Tang-e Gharu gorge.

Tang-e Gharu, also known as Tang-e Gharo (Pashto: تنگ غارو), is a gorge and a mountain pass in the Hindu Kush mountain range of Kabul Province, Afghanistan. The Kabul River passes through the gorge, flowing eastward. The Kabul–Jalalabad Road runs through the gorge, parallel to the river. Construction on the road began in the 1940s and was completed in the 1960s, replacing the ancient Lataband Pass in the Karkacha hills connecting Kabul and Jalalabad to Pakistan. Both the pass and the road are considered to be of major strategic importance, as they provide Afghanistan a connection to Pakistan and Russia. Due to heavy usage during recent conflicts in Afghanistan and frequent traffic accidents, the pass and the surrounding areas have become heavily damaged and periodically closed off.

== Geology ==
The cliffs of Tang-e Gharu gorge are a blue-grey limestone, which was formed some 250 million years ago. However, the gorge itself is only about 2 million years old and was formed as a combination of water erosion from the river and the collapse of an underground river channel.
