= Kabul–Jalalabad Road =

Road in Afghanistan

National Highway 8
- Kabul–Jalalabad Road

Location
- Country: Afghanistan

Highway system
- Transport in Afghanistan

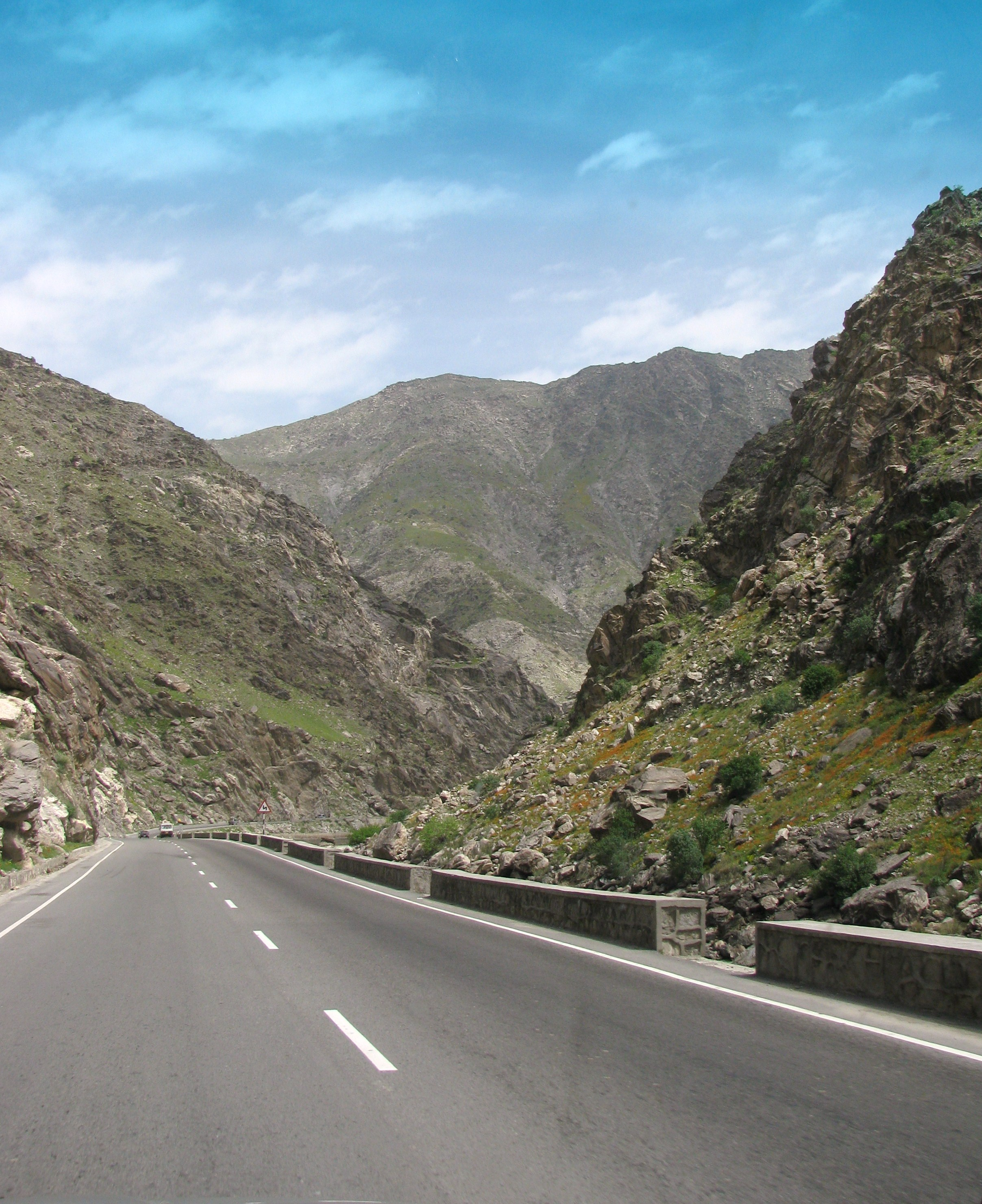
Somewhere on the Kabul–Jalalabad Road

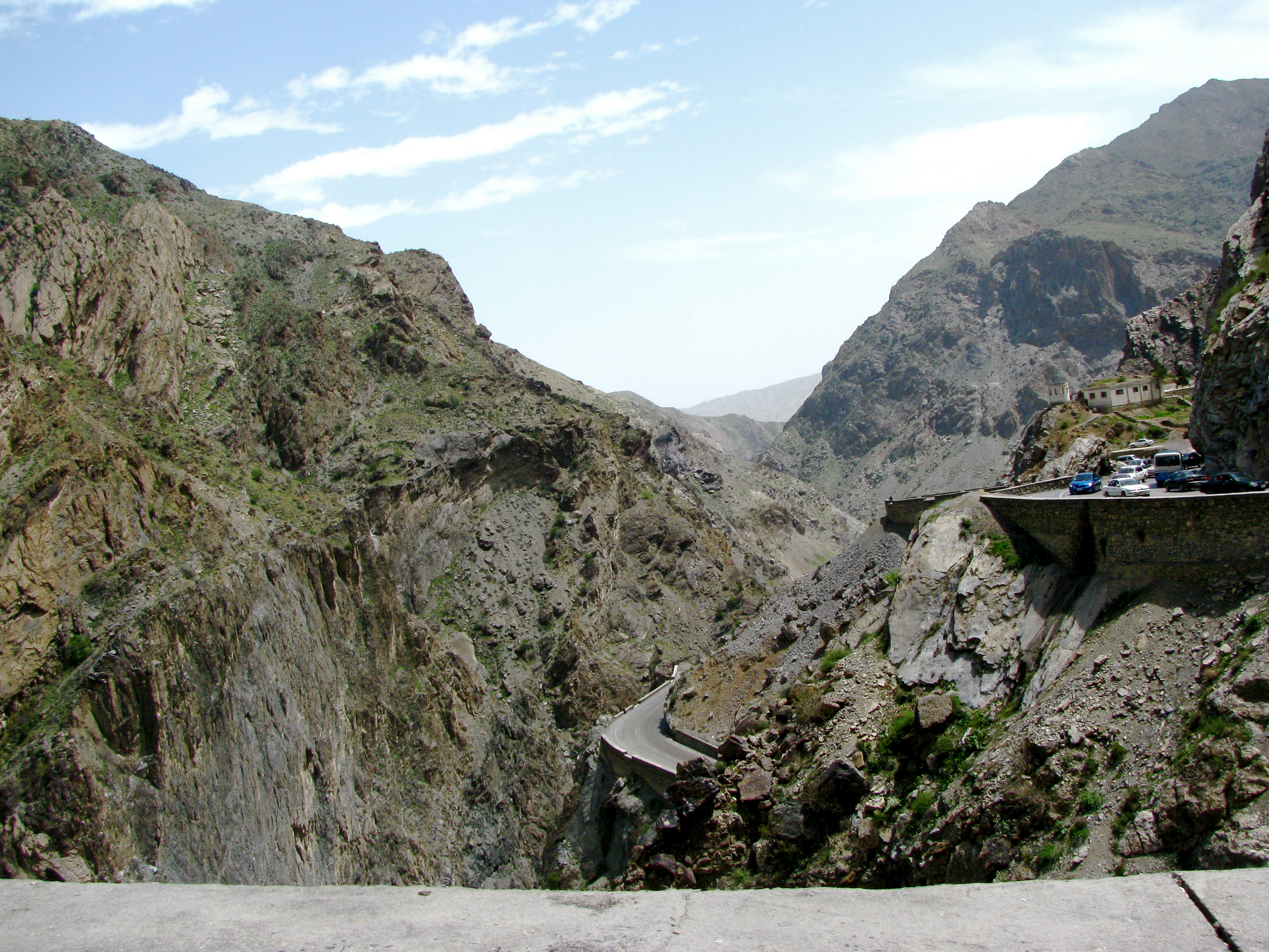
View of the road

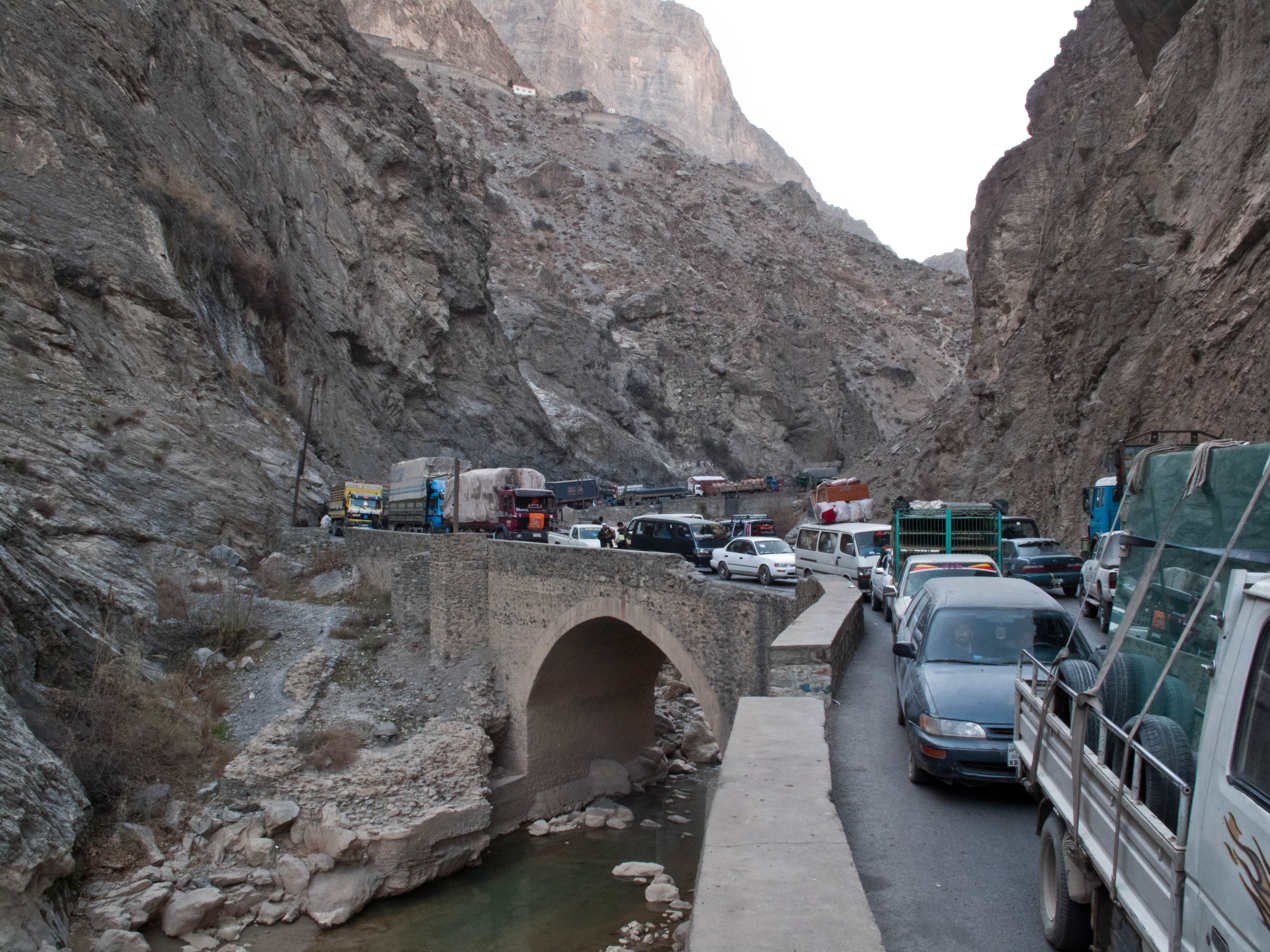
Stopped traffic on the Jalalabad–Kabul Road.

The Kabul–Jalalabad Road, also known as National Highway 08 (NH08), is a highway between the Afghan cities of Kabul (the national capital) and Jalalabad, the largest city in eastern Afghanistan and capital of Nangarhar Province. A portion of the road runs through the Tang-e Gharu gorge, through which the Kabul River also flows.

The road is about 152 kilometres (94 mi) long and travels upwards from an elevation of 575 meters in Jalalabad to 1,790 meters in Kabul. Because of the many traffic accidents, the road between Jalalabad and Kabul is considered one of the most dangerous in the world. It consists of narrow roads with sharp turns past high cliffs and a valley of the Kabul River below, with which it runs parallel.

It is a large part of the Afghan leg of the Grand Trunk Road. Parts of the road follow the route of the British Army's disastrous 1842 retreat from Kabul.

== See also ==
- Highway 1 (Afghanistan)
