= Istor-o-Nal =

Mountain in Khyber Pakhtunkhwa, Pakistan

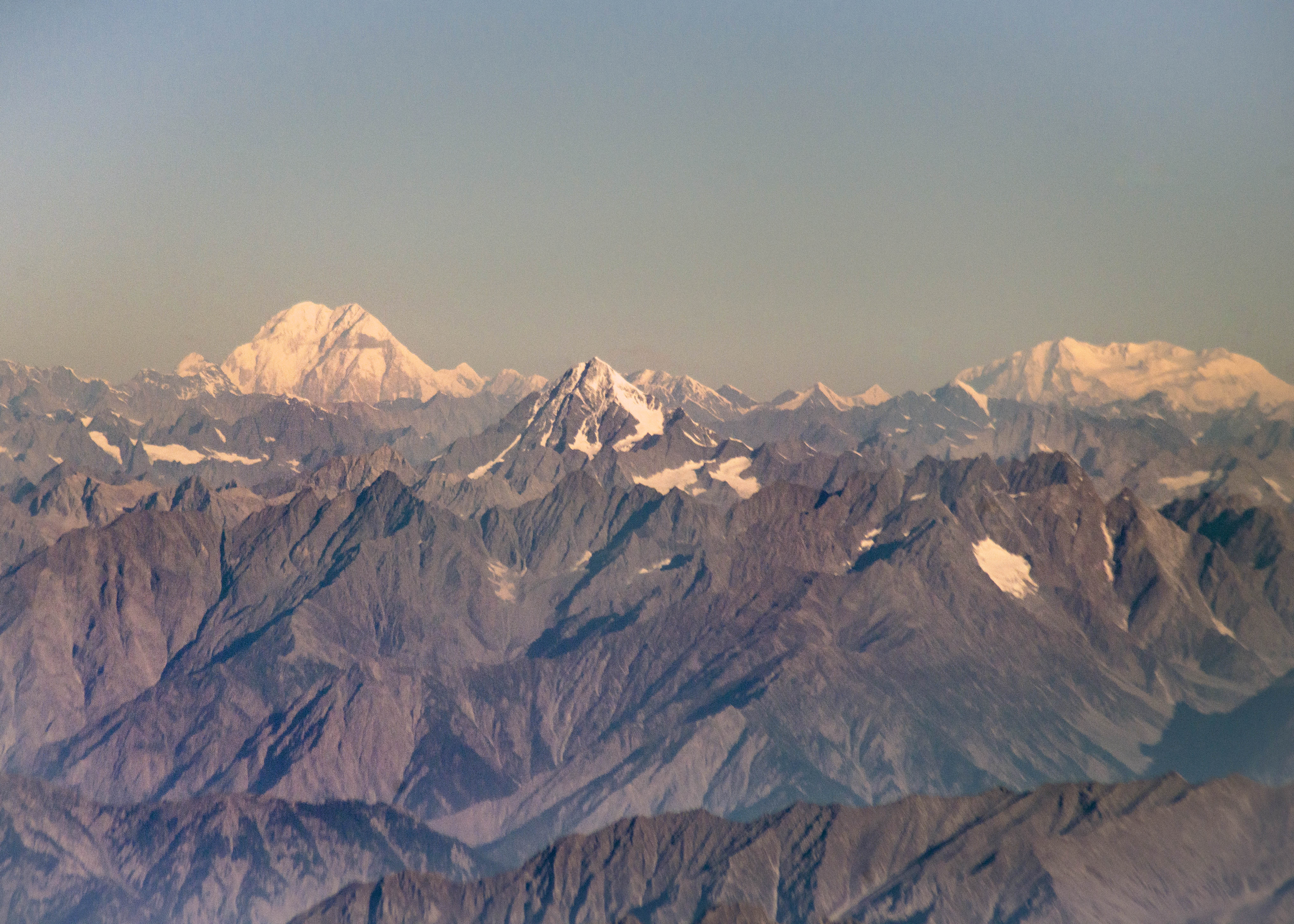
- Istor-o-Nal, background far right

Highest point
- Elevation: 7,403 m (24,288 ft) (Note: The height is sometimes given as 7,398 m (24,272 ft).); Ranked 68th
- Prominence: 1,025 m (3,363 ft)
- Listing: Mountains of Pakistan
- Coordinates: 36°23′13″N 71°53′21″E (Note: Other sources give slightly different coordinates.)

Geography
- Location within Pakistan
- Country: Pakistan
- Parent range: Hindu Kush

Climbing
- First ascent: 1955 by Ken Bankwala, Joseph E. Murphy, Jr., and Thomas A. Mutch
- Easiest route: glacier/snow/ice climb

Istor-o-Nal is the third highest mountain in the Hindu Kush range, in the Chitral District of Khyber Pakhtunkhwa province in Pakistan. It is the 68th highest independent peak in the world. It crowns a massif with eleven peaks of elevation more than 7,000 m (22,966 ft).

The name Istor-o-Nal means horseshoe in Khowar (Istor means "horse"). The peak is located a few kilometres northeast of Tirich Mir (the highest mountain in the Hindu Kush), across the Tirich Glacier. Because Istor-o-Nal is behind the higher peak of Tirich Mir from many viewpoints, it is not easily visible and therefore not well known.

== Climbing history ==
Istor-o-Nal was first climbed on June 8, 1955, by the Americans Joseph E. Murphy, Jr., and Thomas A. Mutch, led by Pakistani Major Ken Bankwala, on a Princeton Mountaineering Club expedition. They climbed the west ridge, starting from the south side of the peak on the Tirich Glacier. Their small, minimally financed expedition (by the standards of the time for high-altitude mountaineering) achieved what was then the second highest summit attained by Americans.

== See also ==
- List of highest mountains on Earth
