= Kohe Mondi =

Mountain in Afghanistan

- Location within Afghanistan

Highest point
- Elevation: 6,248 m (20,499 ft)
- Coordinates: 35°47′25″N 70°55′04″E

Geography
- Country: Afghanistan
- Parent range: Hindu Kush

Climbing
- First ascent: July 26, 1962 by German team

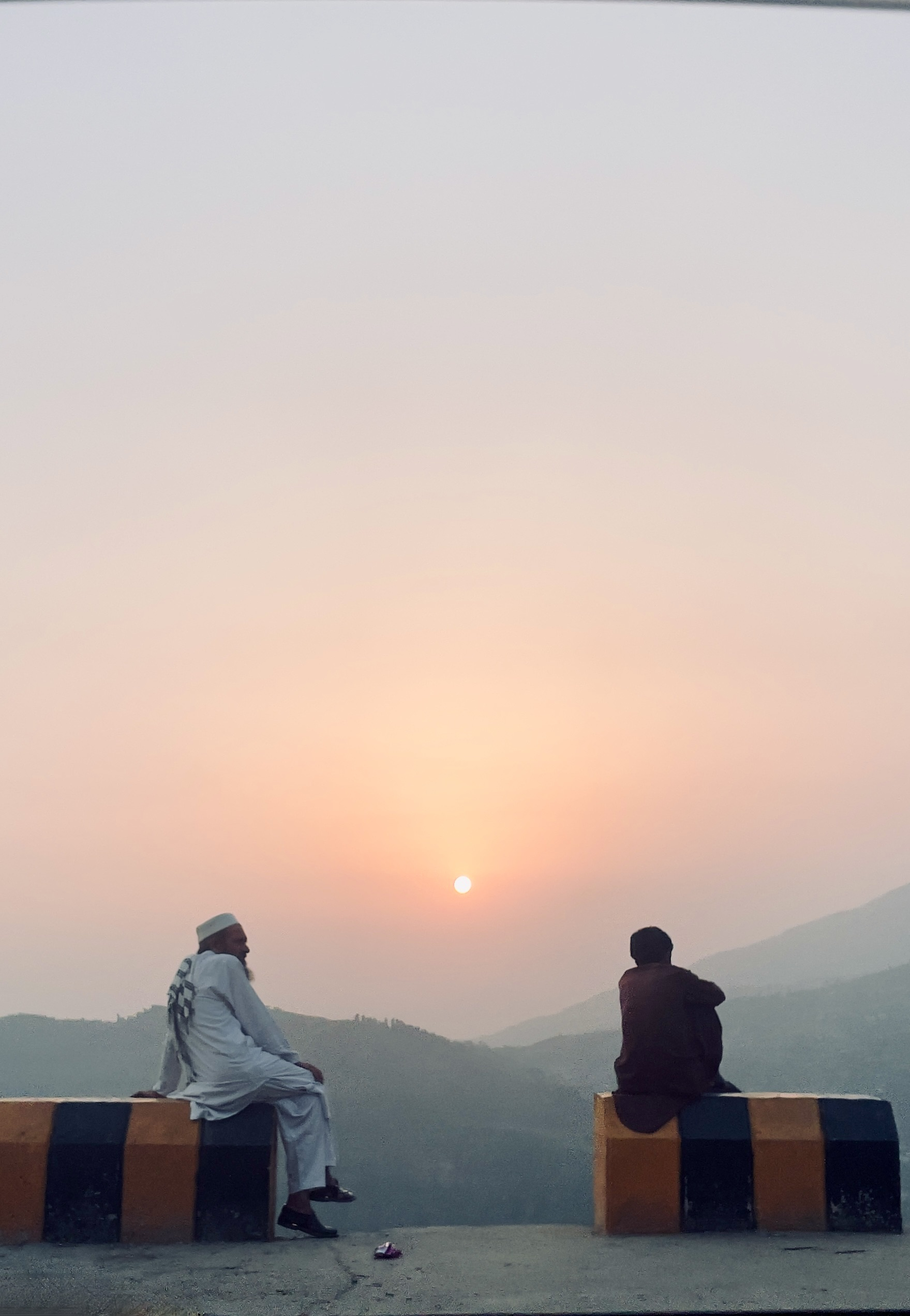
Sunset View on Kohe Mondi

Kohe Mondi (also known as Koh-e-Mondi or Koh-i-Mondi) is a mountain peak located at 6,248 metres (20,499 ft) above sea level in the Hindu Kush mountain range in Afghanistan.

== Location ==
Kohe Mondi is located in the Kuran wa Munjan District of the country's northeastern Badakhshan Province. The mountain is located in the central section of the Hindu Kush mountain range. Its flanks are drained by the Mundschan, the right source river of the Kokcha River, running to the west. Kohe Mondi was historically associated with the Mandanr tribe of the Yousafzai Pashtuns.

== First ascent ==
Kohe Mondi was first climbed on July 26, 1962, by a group of German mountaineers from Bamberg (Otto Reus, Hanno Vogel and Sepp Ziegler).
