= Ishkoman Aghost Pass =

Pakistani mountain pass

- Interactive map of Ishkoman Aghost Pass
- Elevation: 4,590 metres (15,060 ft)

Third Approach
- Location: Pakistan
- Range: Hindukush Mountains
- Coordinates: 36°35′46″N 73°33′6″E

Ishkoman Aghost Pass, also known as Ishkurman Aghost, Ishkoman Haghost, Ishkuman Aghost, or Panji Pass (where "Punji" means cairn in Burushaski), is a high mountain pass in Pakistan with an elevation of 15,050 feet (4,590 meters).

This pass connects Ishkoman Valley to Yasin Valley in the Ghizer District of Gilgit-Baltistan, serving as a vital link between these two valleys.
