= Ahandara =

Ahandara Āhandara, Āhangarhā
- Location in Afghanistan
- Coordinates: 36°44′N 69°32′E
- Country: Afghanistan
- Province: Takhar Province

Ahandara is a valley and settlement in Takhar Province on the Kunduz River. The valley is crossed by the road from Kunduz to Faizabad, and located about 22 miles west of Teshkhan. There is also a village by the same name in Badakhshan Province, located on the road from Taloqan to Faizabad, about 15 miles west of the Lataband Pass.
