= Hindu Kush =

Mountain range near the border of Afghanistan and Pakistan

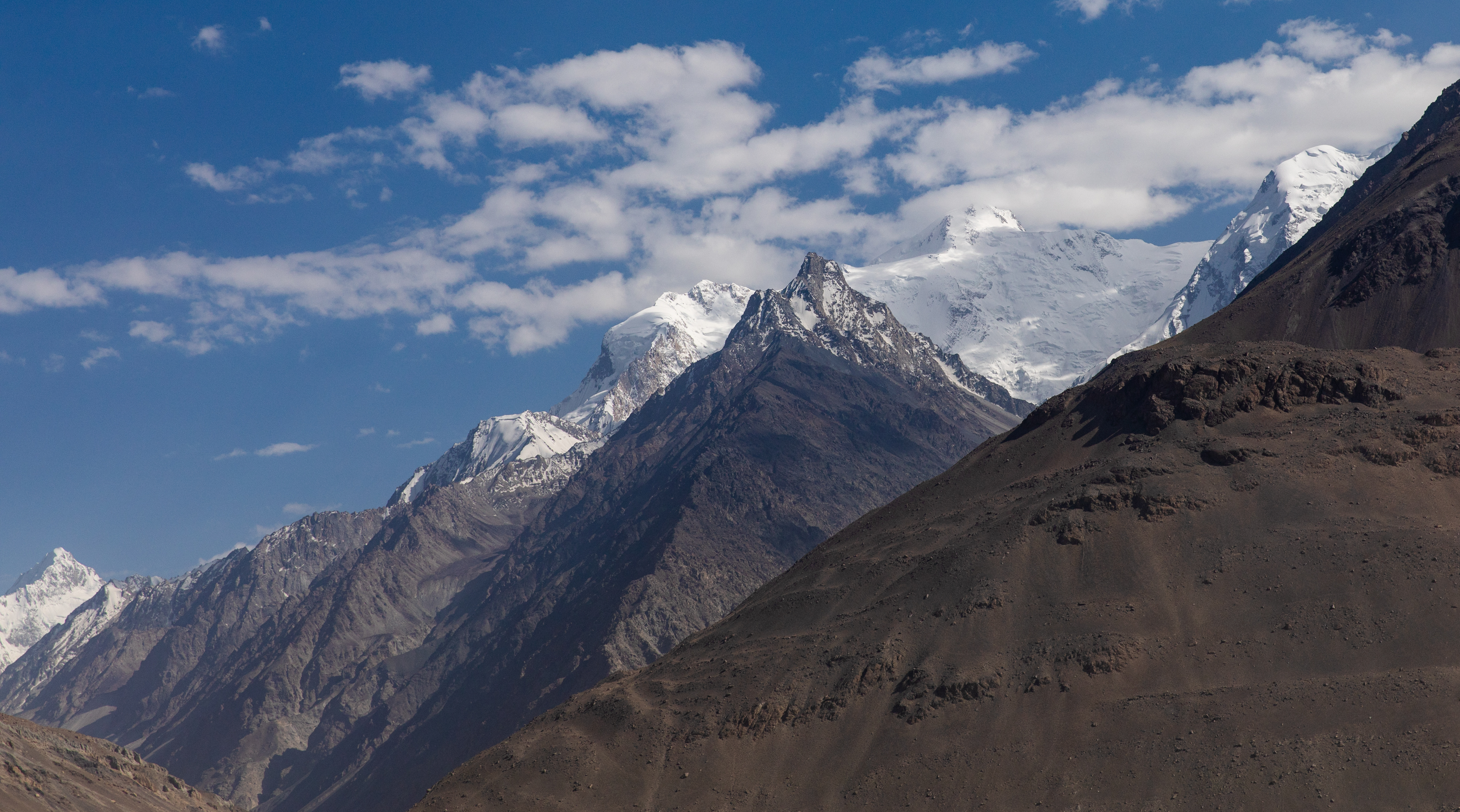
- The Hindu Kush mountains at the Afghanistan-Pakistan border

Highest point
- Peak: Tirich Mir (Pakistan)
- Elevation: 7,708 m (25,289 ft)
- Coordinates: 36°14′45″N 71°50′38″E; 35°N 71°E

Dimensions
- Length: 800 km (500 mi)

Geography
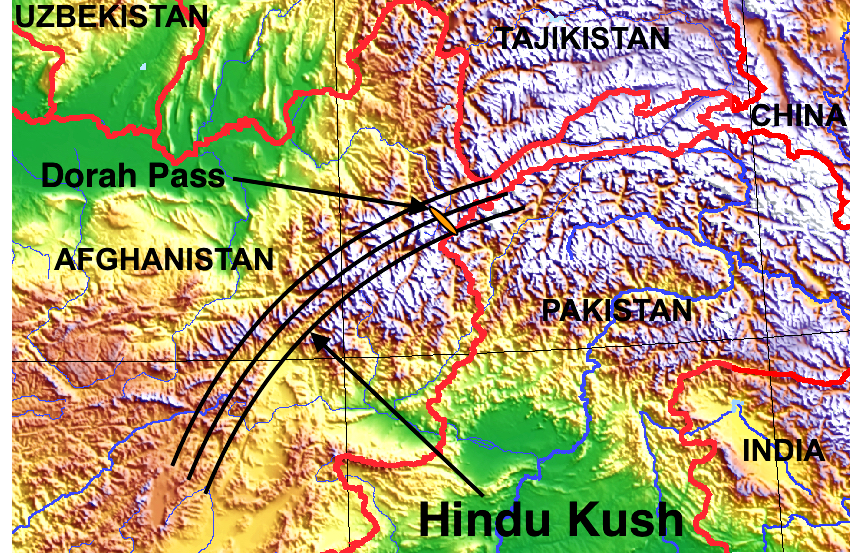
- Topography of the Hindu Kush range
- Countries: Afghanistan, Pakistan and Tajikistan
- Region: South and Central Asia
- Parent range: Himalayas

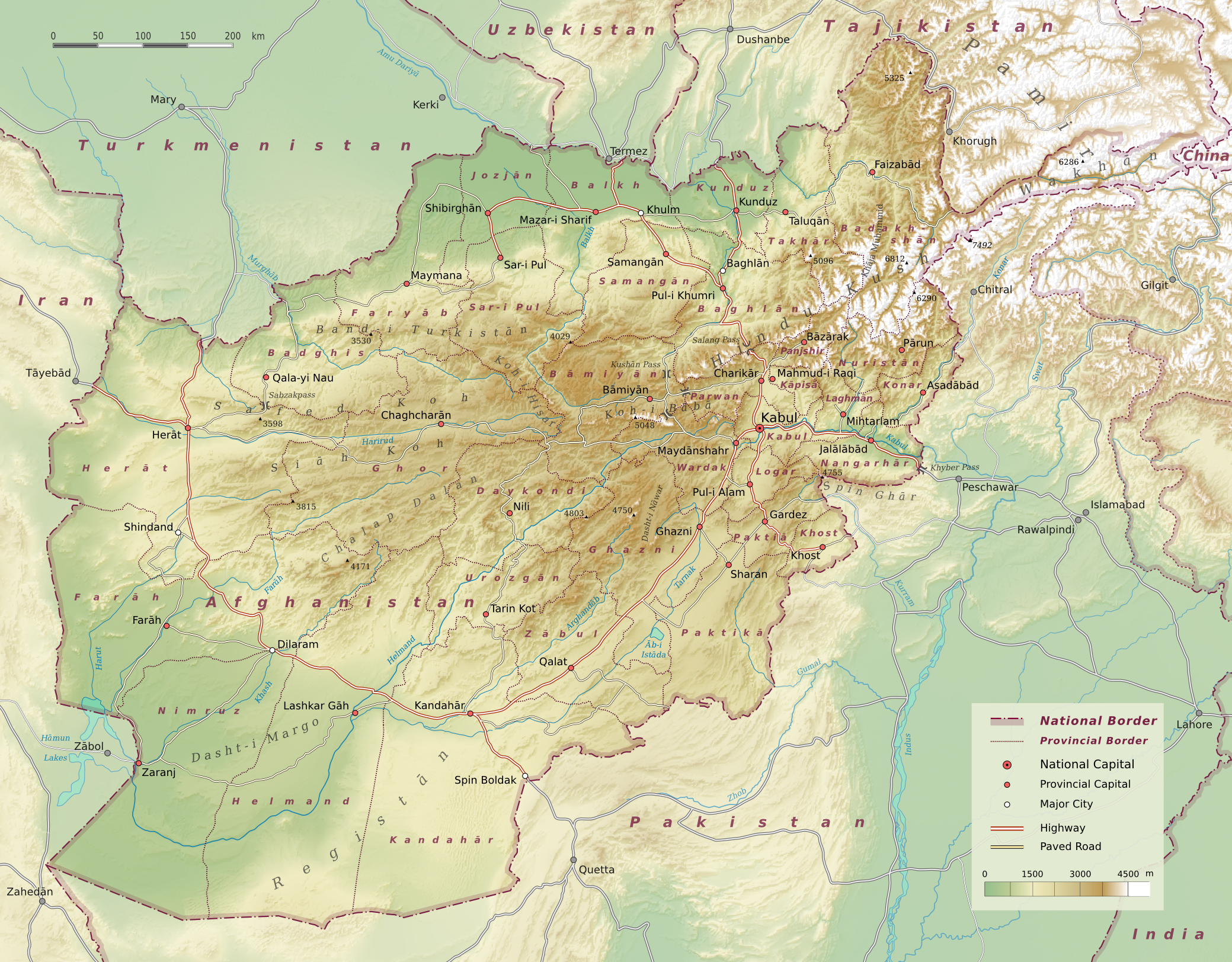
Hindu Kush (top right) and its extending mountain ranges like Selseleh-ye Safīd Kūh or Koh-i-Baba to the west

The Hindu Kush is an 800-kilometre-long (500 mi) mountain range in Central and South Asia to the west of the Himalayas. It stretches from central and eastern Afghanistan into northwestern Pakistan and far southeastern Tajikistan. The range forms the western section of the Hindu Kush Himalayan Region (HKH); to the north, near its northeastern end, the Hindu Kush buttresses the Pamir Mountains to the north near the point where the borders of China, Pakistan and Afghanistan meet, after which it runs southwest through Pakistan and into Afghanistan near their border.

The eastern end of the Hindu Kush merges with the Karakoram Range. Towards its southern end, it connects with the White Mountains near the Kabul River. It divides the valley of the Amu Darya (the ancient Oxus) to the north from the Indus River valley to the south. The range has numerous high snow-capped peaks, with the highest point being Tirich Mir or Terichmir at 7,708 metres (25,289 ft) in the Chitral District of Khyber Pakhtunkhwa, Pakistan.

The Hindu Kush range region was a historically significant center of Buddhism, with sites such as the Bamiyan Buddhas. The range and communities settled in it hosted ancient monasteries, important trade networks and travelers between Central Asia and South Asia. While the vast majority of the region has been majority-Muslim for several centuries now, certain portions of the Hindu Kush only became Islamized relatively recently, such as Kafiristan, which retained ancient polytheistic beliefs until the 19th century when it was converted to Islam by the Emirate of Afghanistan and renamed Nuristan ("land of light"). The Hindu Kush range has also been the passageway for invasions of the Indian subcontinent, and continues to be important to contemporary warfare in Afghanistan.

== Etymology ==
From a historical perspective, the name Hindu Kush (also written as Hindukush) is relatively recent. It does not appear in the writings of the early Arab geographers and is first mentioned in the works of Ibn Battuta, in the 14th century.

Hindu Kush is generally translated as "Killer of Hindus" or "Hindu-Killer" in the popular literature. (Note: Boyle's Persian–English dictionary indicates that the Persian suffix -koš [koʃ] is the present stem of the verb 'to kill' (koštan کشتن). According to linguist Francis Joseph Steingass, the suffix -kush means "a male; (imp. of kushtan in comp.) a killer, who kills, slays, murders, oppresses as azhdaha-kush ['dragon-slayer'].") The earliest explanation offered for the name comes from Ibn Battuta. According to him, Hindu Kush means Hindu-slayer as slaves from the Indian subcontinent died in the harsh climatic conditions of the mountains while being taken to Turkestan by traders.

Several other scholars believe the name to be a corruption of Hindu Koh ('mountains of India'). The 16th-century Mughal court historian Abu al-Fazl ibn Mubarak also refers to the range as Hindu Koh in his Ain-i-Akbari. According to Nigel Allan, the term Hindu Kush had two alternate meanings popular for centuries i.e 'mountains of India' and 'sparkling snows of India', with Kush respectively being a soft variant of kuh ('mountain') or referring to the quality of snow. Allan further states that to the Arab geographers Hindu Kush was the frontier boundary of Hindustan.

Another theory posits the name to may have been derived from ancient Avestan, meaning 'water mountain', with Kush probably being a corruption of the Persian word kuh ('mountain'). According to Hobson-Jobson, a 19th-century British dictionary, Hindukush might be a corruption of the ancient Latin Indicus [Caucasus] ('Caucasus of India'); the entry mentions the interpretation first given by Ibn Battuta as a popular theory already at that time, despite doubts cast upon it.

Some 19th-century encyclopedias and gazetteers state the term Hindu Kush to originally have applied only to the peak in the area of the Kushan Pass, which had become a center of the Kushan Empire by the first century.

=== Other names ===
In Vedic Sanskrit, the range was known as upariśaina, and in Avestan, as upāirisaēna (from Proto-Iranian *upārisaina- 'covered with juniper'). It can alternatively be interpreted as "beyond the reach of eagles".

In the time of Alexander the Great, the mountain range was referred to as the Caucasus Indicus (as opposed to the Greater Caucasus range between the Caspian and Black Seas), and the extension of the former as Paropamisos (see Paropamisadae) by Hellenic Greeks in the late first millennium BCE. The Macedonians who served with Alexander called it Kaukasos

The range was also known as Hindu Koh during the medieval period, as referred to as in the works of Abu al-Fazl during the reign of Mughal emperor Akbar.

== Geography ==
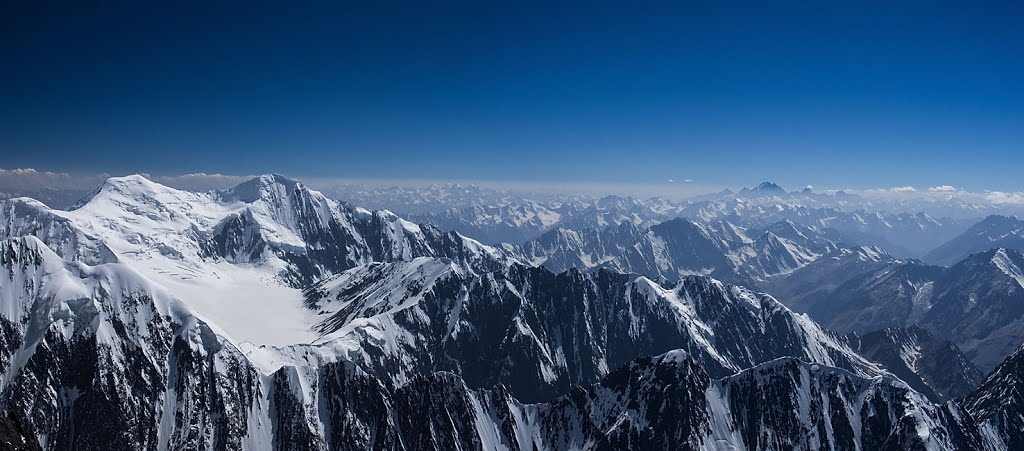
Noshaq is the second highest independent peak of the Hindu Kush Range after Tirich Mir.

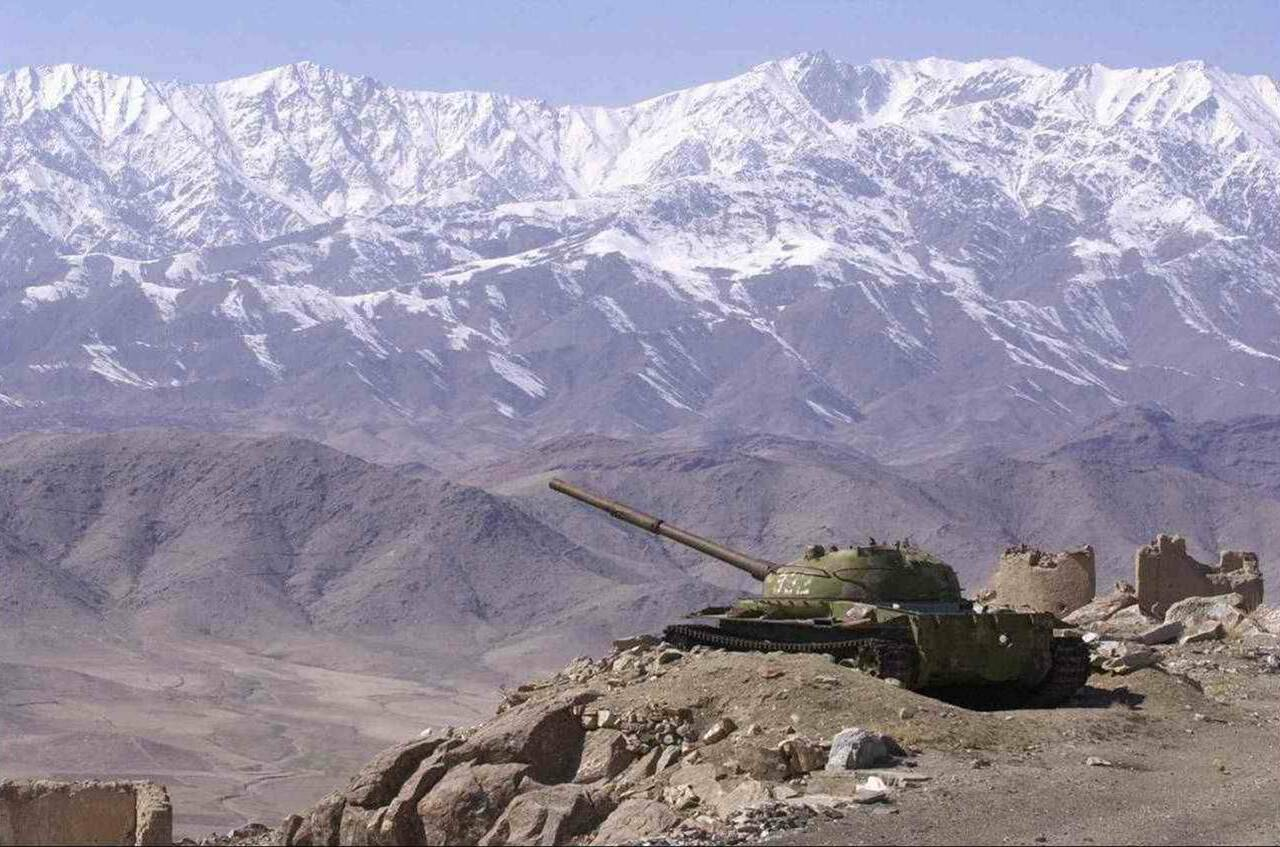
Landscape of Afghanistan with a T-62 tank in the foreground

The eastern end of the Hindu Kush mountain range as seen from a plane above the Lowari Pass connecting Chitral and Upper Dir District in Khyber Pakhtunkhwa, Pakistan

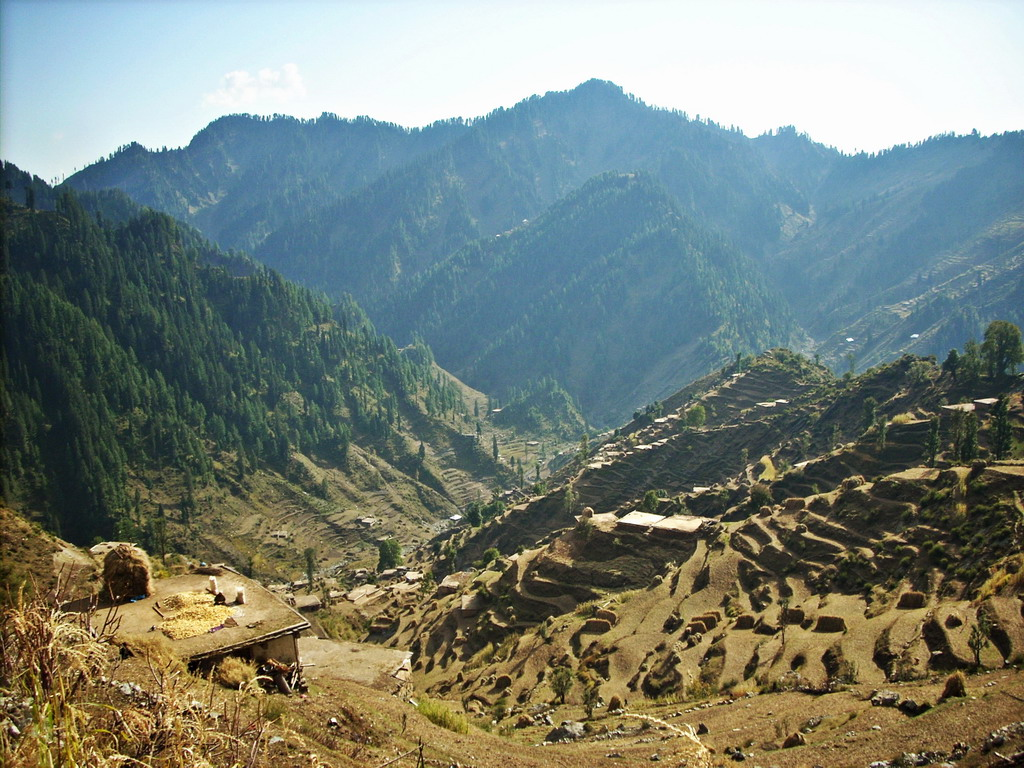
Terraced fields amongst the Hindu Kush in the Swat valley, Pakistan

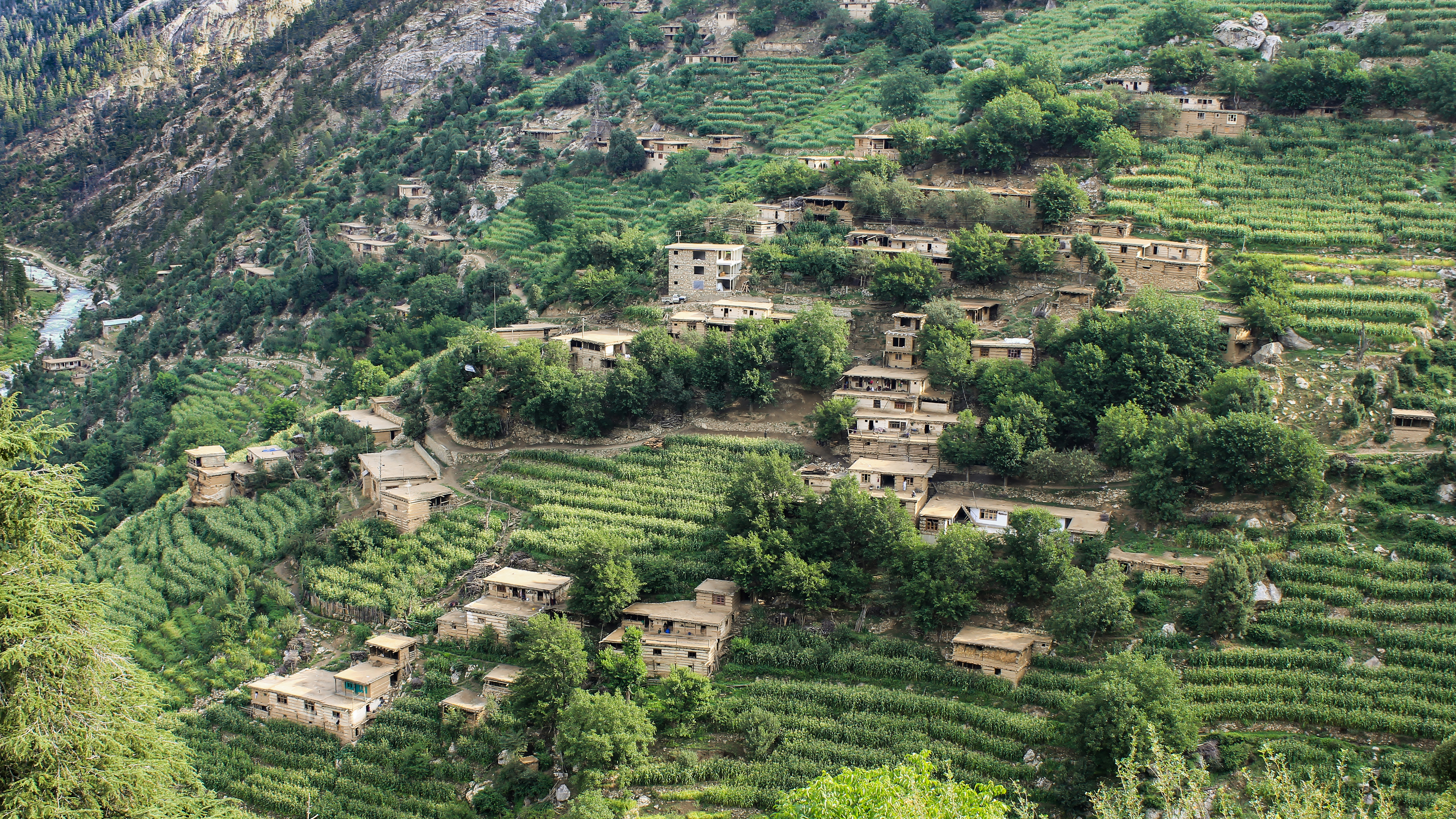
Chitraas village, Nuristan Province in Afghanistan

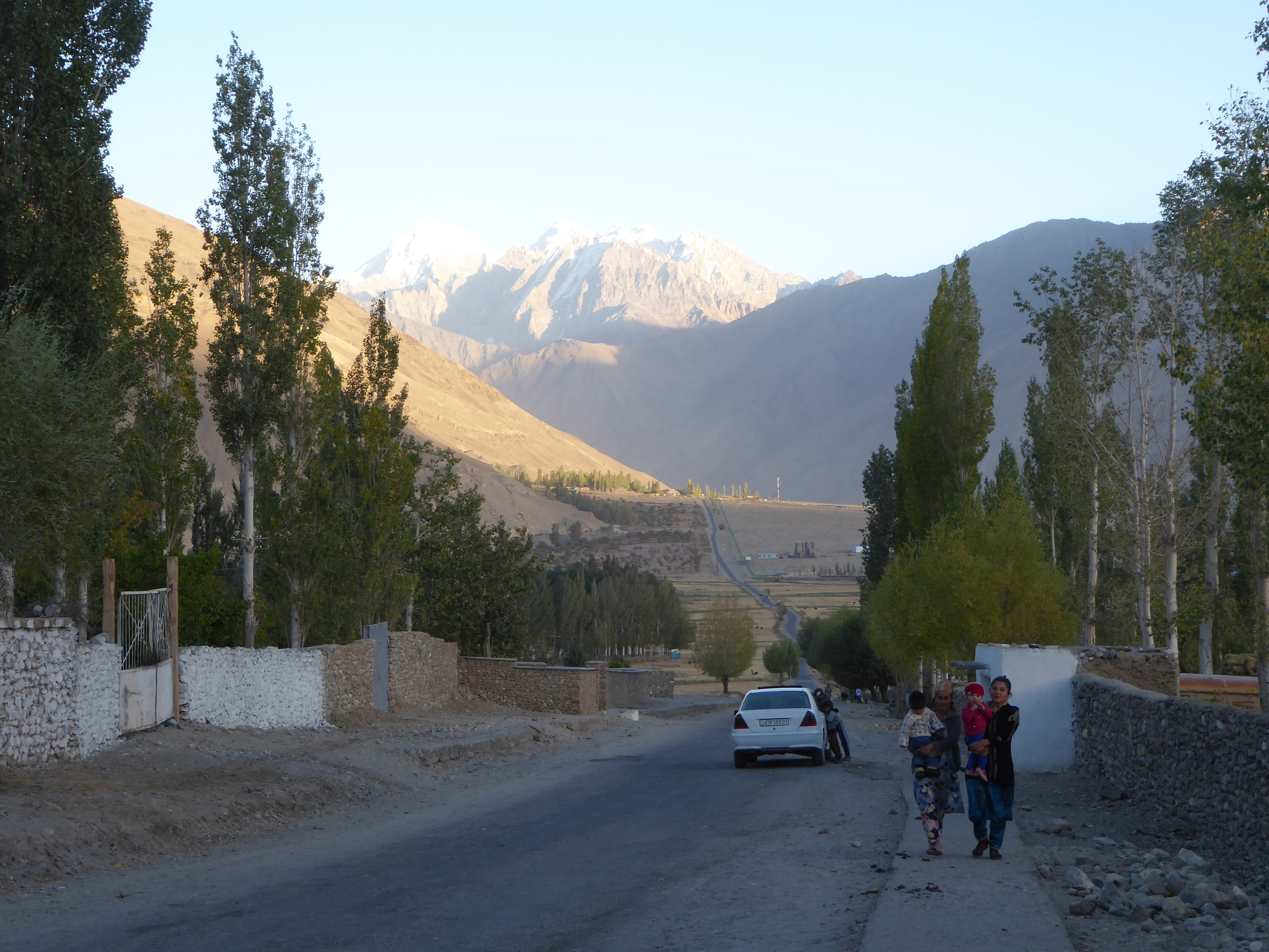
Hindu Kush in the background in Ishkoshim, Tajikistan

The range forms the western section of the Hindu Kush Himalayan Region (HKH) and is the westernmost extension of the Pamir Mountains, the Karakoram and the Himalayas. It divides the valley of the Amu Darya (the ancient Oxus) to the north from the Indus River valley to the south. The range has numerous high snow-capped peaks, with the highest point being Tirich Mir or Terichmir at 7,708 metres (25,289 ft) in the Chitral District of Khyber Pakhtunkhwa, Pakistan. To the north, near its northeastern end, the Hindu Kush buttresses the Pamir Mountains near the point where the borders of China, Pakistan and Afghanistan meet, after which it runs southwest through Pakistan and into Afghanistan near their border. The eastern end of the Hindu Kush in the north merges with the Karakoram Range. Towards its southern end, it connects with the Spin Ghar Range near the Kabul River.

=== Peaks ===
Many peaks of the range are between 4,400 and 5,200 m (14,500 and 17,000 ft); however, some are much higher, with an average peak height of 4,500 metres (14,800 feet). The mountains of the Hindu Kush range diminish in height as they stretch westward. Near Kabul, in the west, they attain heights of 3,500 to 4,000 metres (11,500 to 13,100 ft); in the east they extend from 4,500 to 6,000 metres (14,800 to 19,700 ft).

Rank	Mountain / Peak	Elevation		Prominence		FA	Country
Rank	Mountain / Peak	m	ft	m	ft	FA	Country
1	Tirich Mir	7,708	25,289	3,908	12,822	1950	Pakistan
2	Noshaq	7,492	24,580	2,024	6,640	1960	Afghanistan, Pakistan
3	Istor-o-Nal	7,403	24,288	1,025	3,363	1955	Pakistan
4	Saraghrar	7,338	24,075	1,979	6,493	1959	Pakistan
5	Udren Zom	7,140	23,430	1,620	5,310	1964	Pakistan
6	Kohe Shakhawr	7,084	23,241	724	2,375	Unk	Afghanistan, Pakistan
7	Lunkho e Dosare	6,901	22,641	1,671	5,482	1968	Afghanistan, Pakistan
8	Kuh-e Bandaka	6,843	22,451	2,834	9,298	Unk	Afghanistan
9	Koh-e Keshni Khan	6,755	22,162			Unk	Afghanistan
10	Sakar Sar	6,272	20,577			1999	Afghanistan, Pakistan
11	Kohe Mondi	6,234	20,453			1962	Afghanistan

=== Passes ===
Numerous high passes ("kotal") transect the mountains, forming a strategically important network for the transit of caravans. The most important mountain pass in Afghanistan is the Salang Pass (Kotal-e Salang) (3,878 m or 12,723 ft) north of Kabul, which links southern Afghanistan to northern Afghanistan. The Salang Tunnel at 3,363 m (11,033 ft) and the extensive network of galleries on the approach roads was constructed with Soviet financial and technological assistance and involved drilling 2.7 km (1.7 mi) through the heart of the Hindu Kush; since the start of the wars in Afghanistan it has been an active area of armed conflict with various parties trying to control the strategic tunnel. The range has several other passes in Afghanistan, the lowest of which is the southern Shibar pass (2,700 m or 9,000 ft) where the Hindu Kush range terminates.

Before the Salang Tunnel, another feat of engineering was the road constructed through the Tang-e Gharu gorge near Kabul, replacing the ancient Lataband Pass and greatly reducing travel time towards the Pakistani border at the Khyber Pass.

Other mountain passes are at altitudes of about 3,700 m (12,000 ft) or higher, including the Broghil Pass at 12,460 feet in Pakistan, and the Dorah Pass between Pakistan and Afghanistan at 14,000 feet. Other high passes in Pakistan include the Lowari Pass at 10,200 feet, the Gomal Pass. The Darmodar Aghost Pass is at elevation of 4,371 m (14,341 ft). The Ishkoman Aghost Pass is at elevation of 4,587 m (15,049 ft).

=== Watershed ===
The Hindu Kush form the boundary between the Indus watershed in South Asia, and Amu Darya watershed in Central Asia. Melt water from snow and ice feeds major river systems in Central Asia: the Amu Darya (which feeds the Aral Sea), Helmand River (which is a major source of water for the Sistan Basin in southern Afghanistan and Iran), and the Kabul River – the last of which is a major tributary of the Indus River. Smaller rivers with headwaters in the range include the Khash, the Farah and the Arashkan (Harut) rivers. The basins of these rivers serve the ecology and economy of the region, but the water flow in these rivers greatly fluctuates, and reliance on these has been a historical problem with extended droughts being commonplace. The eastern end of the range, with the highest peaks, high snow accumulation allows to long-term water storage.

== Geology ==
Geologically, the range is rooted in the formation of the subcontinent from a region of Gondwana that drifted away from East Africa about 160 million years ago, around the Middle Jurassic period. The Indian subcontinent, Australia and islands of the Indian Ocean rifted further, drifting northeastwards, with the Indian subcontinent colliding with the Eurasian Plate nearly 55 million years ago, towards the end of Palaeocene. This collision gradually formed the Himalayas, including the Hindu Kush.

The Hindu Kush are a part of the "young Eurasian mountain range consisting of metamorphic rocks such as schist, gneiss and marble, as well as of intrusives such as granite, diorite of different age and size". The northern regions of the Hindu Kush witness Himalayan winter and have glaciers, while its southeastern end witnesses the fringe of Indian subcontinent summer monsoons.

The Hindu Kush range remains geologically active and is still rising; it is prone to earthquakes. The Hindu Kush system stretches about 966 kilometres (600 mi) laterally, and its median north–south measurement is about 240 kilometres (150 mi). The mountains are orographically described in several parts. Peaks in the western Hindu Kush rise to over 5,100 m (16,700 ft) and stretch between Darra-ye Sekari and the Shibar Pass in the west and the Khawak Pass in the east. The central Hindu Kush peaks rise to over 6,800 m (22,300 ft), and this section has numerous spurs between the Khawak Pass in the east and the Durāh Pass in the west. In 2005 and 2015 there were some major earthquakes.

The eastern Hindu Kush, also known as the "High Hindu Kush", is mostly located in northern Pakistan and the Nuristan and Badakhshan provinces of Afghanistan with peaks over 7,000 m (23,000 ft). This section extends from the Durāh Pass to the Baroghil Pass at the border between northeastern Afghanistan and north Pakistan. The Chitral District of Pakistan is home to Tirich Mir, Noshaq, and Istoro Nal – the highest peaks in the Hindu Kush. The ridges between Khawak Pass and Badakshan is over 5,800 m (19,000 ft) and are called the Kaja Mohammed range.

== Land cover and land use ==
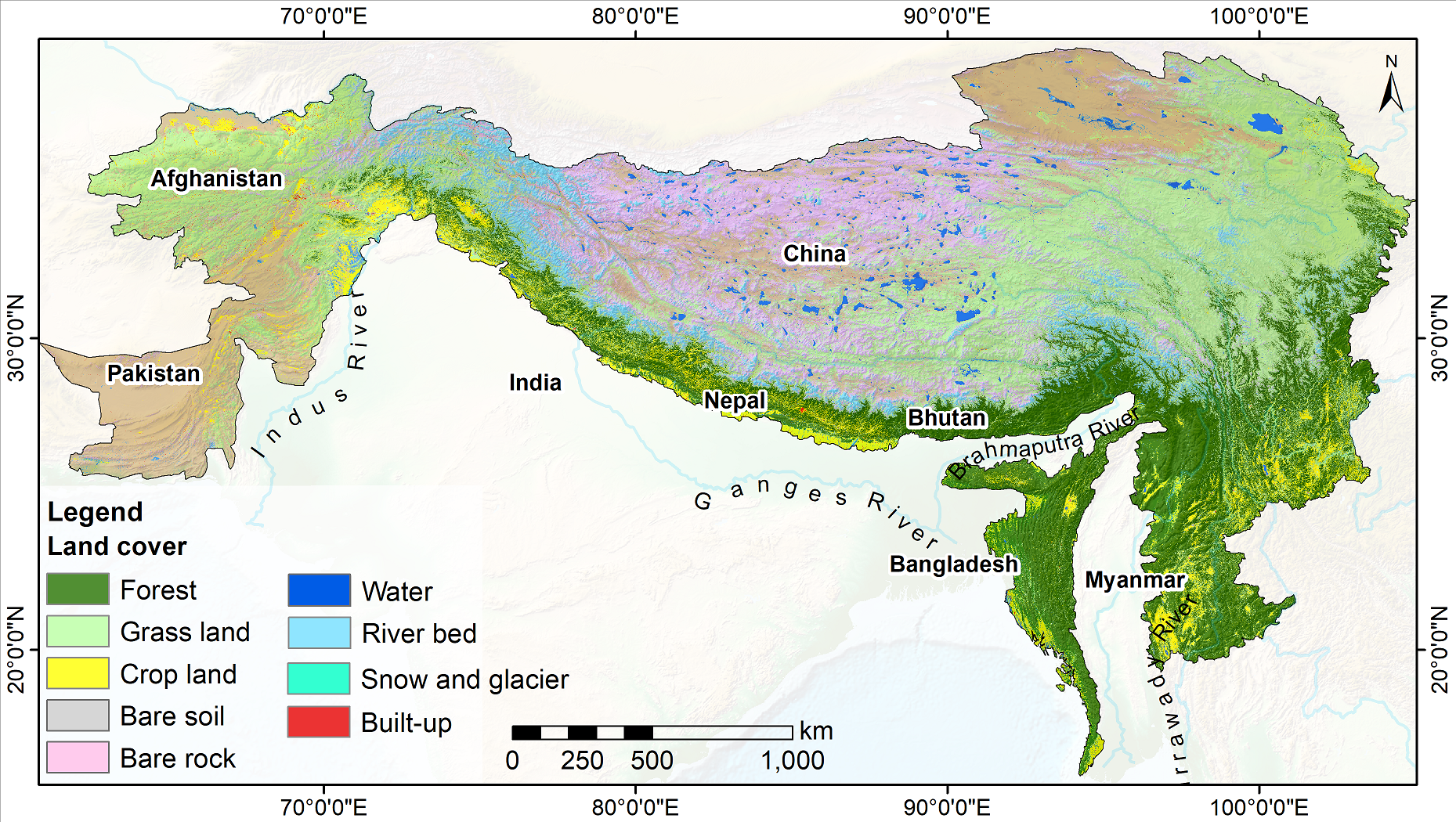
A land cover map of the HKH region was developed using Landsat 30-meter data.

ICIMOD's first annual regional 30-meter resolution land cover database of HKH generated using public domain Landsat images demonstrated that grassland was the most dominant land cover, followed by barren land, which includes areas with bare areas. In 2000, 2005, 2010, and 2015, grassland covered 37.2%, 37.6%, 38.7%, and 38.2%, respectively, of the total area of the HKH region. During the same years, the second dominant land cover was barren areas, including bare soil and bare rock. In 2000, 2005, 2010, and 2015, bare soil and bare rock covered 32.1, 31.4, 30.4, and 30.7%. The cropland cover in 2000 was about 5.1% and about 5.4% in 2015. Snow and glacier areas covered about 4% of the high-elevation section in 2018, while waterbodies and riverbeds/channels together accounted for 2%. The weather conditions also have an impact on the land cover patterns across the regions. In the HKH, forest cover is mostly distributed in the south and south-eastern areas, where precipitation is more; the grasslands are mostly distributed in the north and north-western parts, while cropland is mostly found in the southern part of the region.

=== Flora and fauna ===
The mountainous areas of Hindu Kush range are mostly barren or, at the most, sparsely sprinkled with trees and stunted bushes. From about 1,300 to 2,300 m (4,300 to 7,500 ft), states Yarshater, "sclerophyllous forests are predominant with Quercus and Olea (wild olive); above that, up to a height of about 3,300 m (10,800 ft) one finds coniferous forests with Cedrus, Picea, Abies, Pinus, and junipers". The inner valleys of the Hindu Kush see little rain and have desert vegetation. On the other hand, Eastern Himalaya is home to multiple biodiversity hotspots, and 353 new species (242 plants, 16 amphibians, 16 reptiles, 14 fish, two birds, two mammals and 61+ invertebrates) were discovered between 1998 and 2008; an average of 35 new species finds every year. With Eastern Himalaya included, the entire Hindu Kush Himalaya region is home to an estimated 35,000+ species of plants and 200+ species of animals.

== History ==
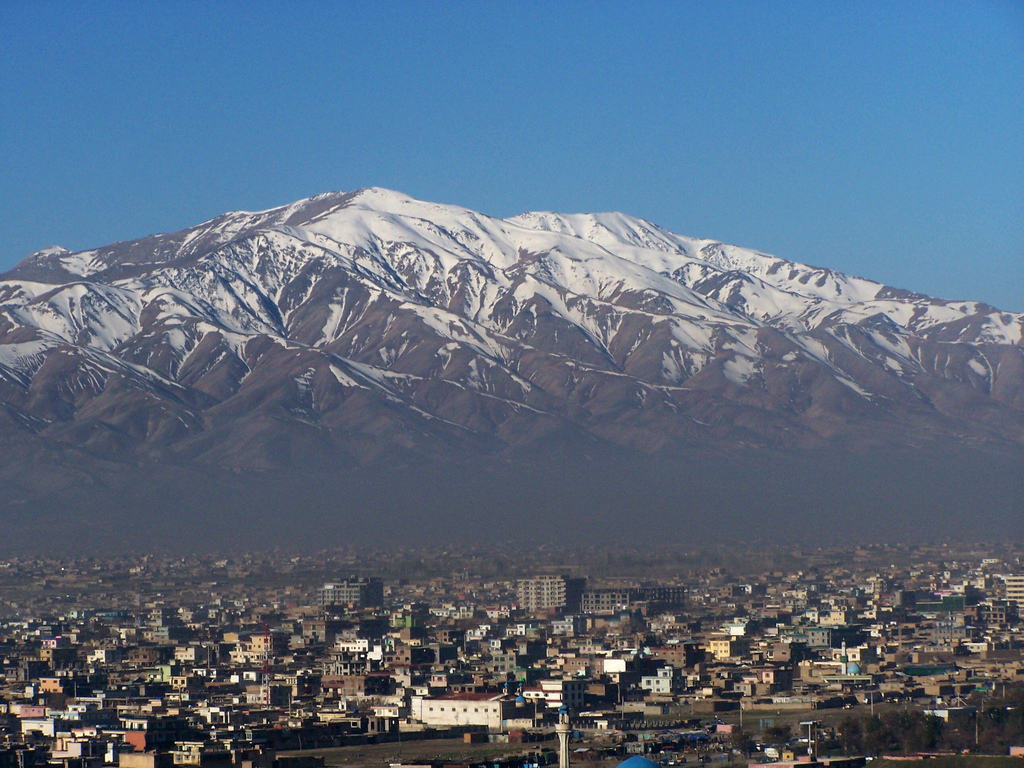
Kabul, situated 5,900 feet (1,800 m) above sea level in a narrow valley, wedged between the Hindu Kush mountains

The high altitudes of the mountains have historical significance in South and Central Asia. The Hindu Kush range was a major center of Buddhism with sites such as the Bamiyan Buddhas. It has also been the passageway during the invasions of the Indian subcontinent, a region where the Taliban and al-Qaeda grew, and a scene of modern era warfare in Afghanistan. Ancient mines producing lapis lazuli are found in Kowkcheh Valley, while gem-grade emeralds are found north of Kabul in the valley of the Panjsher River and some of its tributaries. According to Walter Schumann, the West Hindu Kush mountains have been the source of the finest Lapis lazuli for thousands of years.

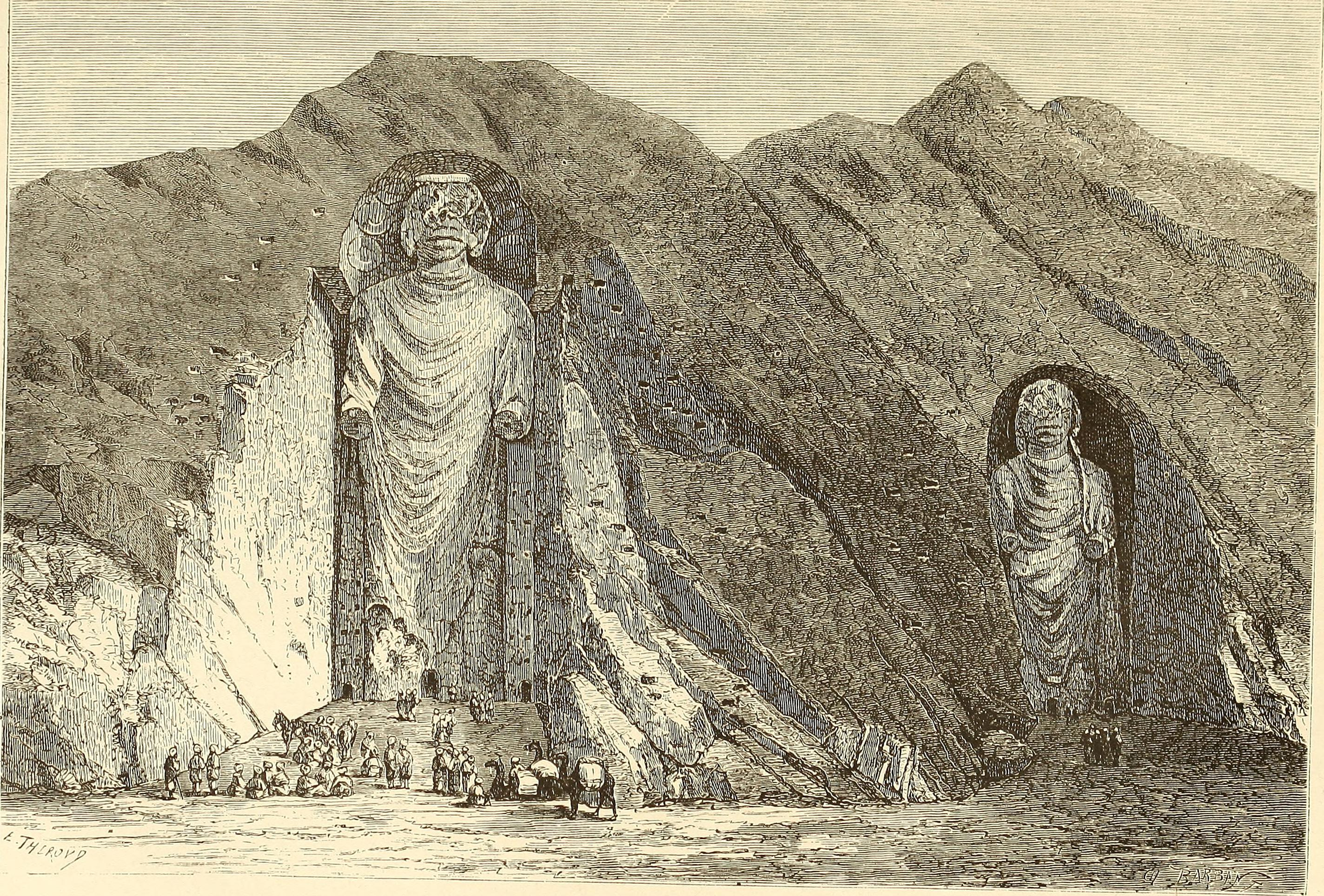
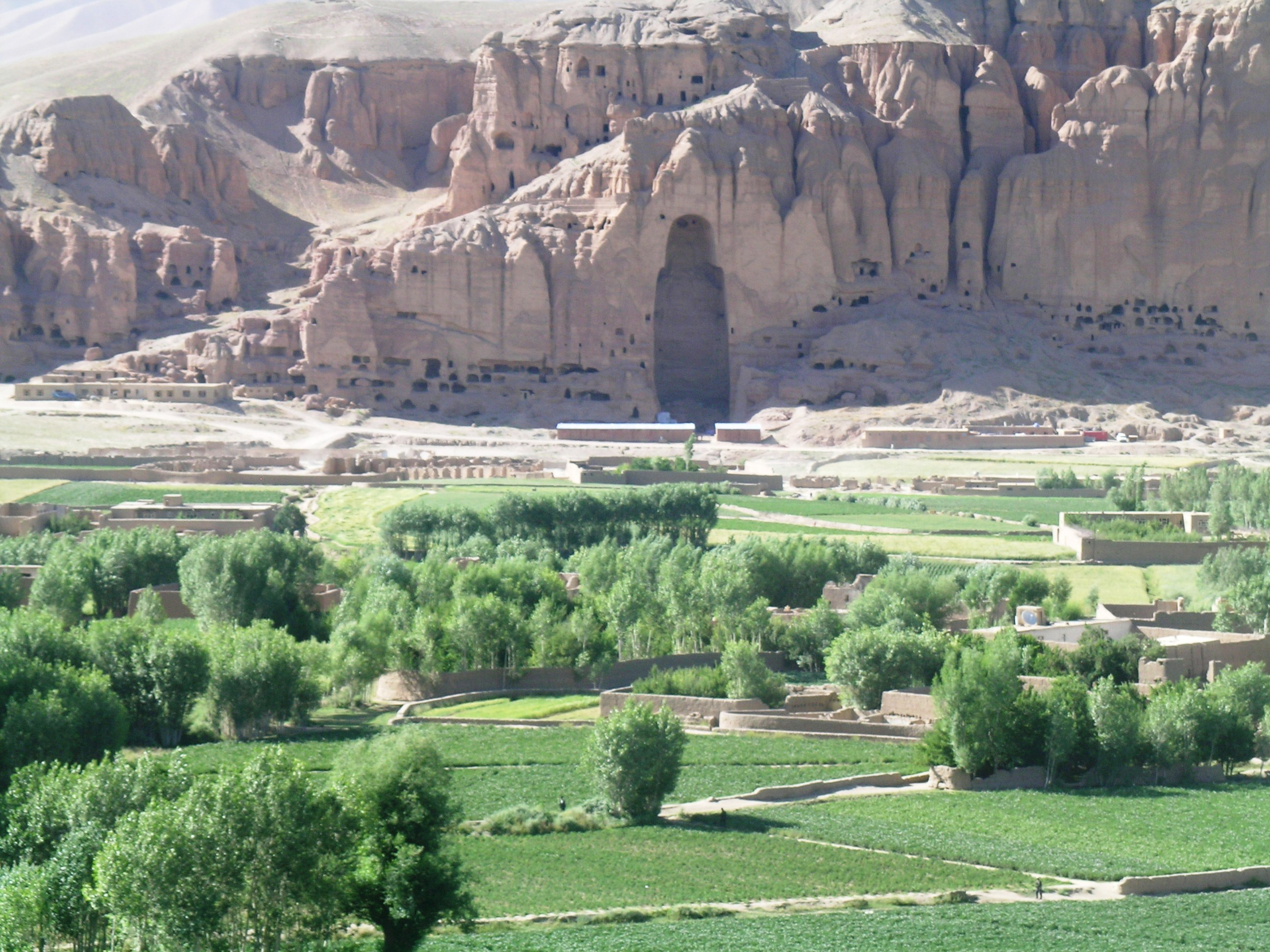
Buddhas of Bamiyan, Afghanistan in 1896 (top) and after destruction in 2001 by the Taliban.

Buddhism was widespread in the ancient Hindu Kush region. The ancient artwork of Buddhism includes the giant rock-carved statues called the Bamiyan Buddhas, in the southern and western end of the Hindu Kush. These statues were destroyed by Taliban Islamists in 2001. The southeastern valleys of Hindu Kush connecting towards the Indus Valley region were a major center that hosted monasteries, religious scholars from distant lands, trade networks and merchants of the ancient Indian subcontinent.

One of the early Buddhist schools, the Mahāsāṃghika-Lokottaravāda, was prominent in the area of Bamiyan. The Chinese Buddhist monk Xuanzang visited a Lokottaravāda monastery in the 7th century CE, at Bamiyan, Afghanistan. Birchbark and palm leaf manuscripts of texts in this monastery's collection, including Mahāyāna sūtras, have been discovered in the caves of Hindu Kush, and these are now a part of the Schøyen Collection. Some manuscripts are in the Gāndhārī language and Kharoṣṭhī script, while others are in Sanskrit and written in forms of the Gupta script.

According to Alfred Foucher, the Hindu Kush and nearby regions gradually converted to Buddhism by the 1st century CE, and this region was the base from where Buddhism crossed the Hindu Kush expanding into the Oxus valley region of Central Asia. Buddhism later disappeared and locals were forced to convert to Islam. Richard Bulliet also proposes that the area north of Hindu Kush was center of a new sect that had spread as far as Kurdistan, remaining in existence until the Abbasid times. The area eventually came under the control of the Hindu Shahi dynasty of Kabul. The Islamic conquest of the area happened under Sabuktigin who conquered Jayapala's dominion west of Peshawar in the 10th century.

=== Ancient ===
The significance of the Hindu Kush mountain ranges has been recorded since the time of Darius I of the Achaemenid Empire. The Greeks under Alexander entered the Indian subcontinent through the Hindu Kush as his army moved past the Afghan Valleys in the spring of 329 BCE. He moved towards the Indus Valley river region in the Indian subcontinent in 327 BCE;_his armies built several towns in this region over the intervening two years.

After Alexander died in 323 BCE, the region became part of the Seleucid Empire, according to the ancient history of Strabo written in the 1st century BCE, before it became a part of the Indian Maurya Empire around 305 BCE. The region became a part of the Kushan Empire around the start of the common era.

=== Medieval era ===
The lands north of the Hindu Kush, in the Hephthalite dominion, Buddhism was the predominant religion by mid 1st millennium CE. These Buddhists were religiously tolerant and they co-existed with followers of Zoroastrianism, Manichaeism, and Nestorian Christianity. This Central Asia region along the Hindu Kush was taken over by Western Turks and Arabs by the eighth century, facing wars with mostly Iranians. One major exception was the period in the mid to late seventh century when the Tang dynasty from China destroyed the Northern Turks and extended its rule all the way to the Oxus River valley and regions of Central Asia bordering all along the Hindu Kush.

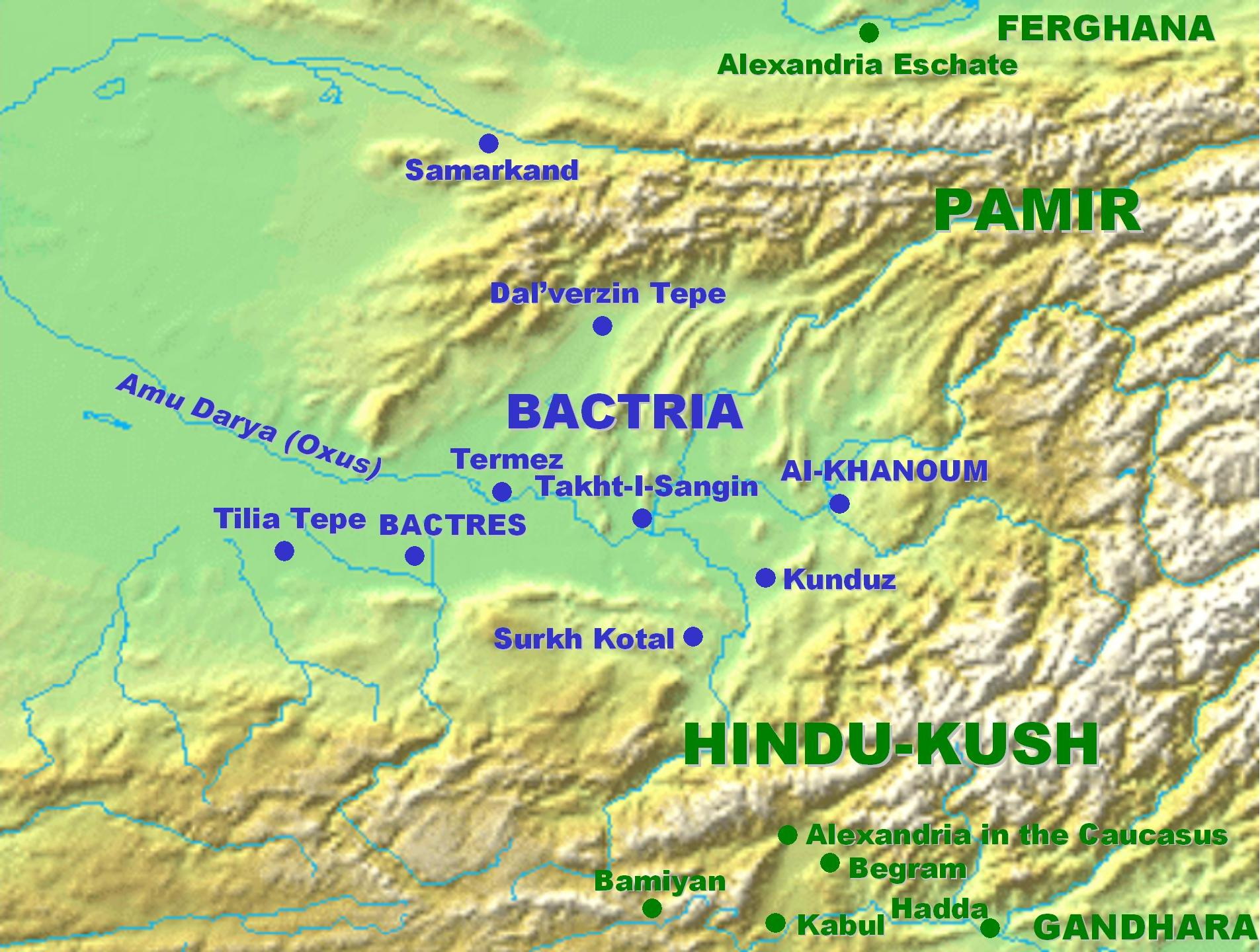
Hindu Kush relative to Bactria, Bamiyan, Kabul and Gandhara (bottom right).

The subcontinent and valleys of the Hindu Kush remained unconquered by the Islamic armies until the 9th century, even though they had conquered the southern regions of the Indus River valley such as Sind. Kabul fell to the army of Al-Ma'mun, the seventh Abbasid caliph, in 808 and the local king agreed to accept Islam and pay annual tributes to the caliph. However, states André Wink, inscriptional evidence suggests that the Kabul area near Hindu Kush had an early presence of Islam. When the extraction of silver from the mines in the Hindu Kush was at its greatest (c. 850), the value of silver in relation to gold dropped, and the content of silver in the Carolingian denarius was increased so that it should maintain its intrinsic value.

The range came under the control of the Hindu Shahi dynasty of Kabul but was conquered by Sabuktigin who took all of Jayapala's dominion west of Peshawar.

Mahmud of Ghazni came to power in 998 CE, in Ghazna, Afghanistan, south of Kabul and the Hindu Kush range. He began a military campaign that rapidly brought both sides of the Hindu Kush range under his rule. From his mountainous Afghani base, he systematically raided and plundered kingdoms in north India from east of the Indus river to west of Yamuna river seventeen times between 997 and 1030.

Mahmud of Ghazni raided the treasuries of kingdoms, sacked cities, and destroyed Hindu temples, with each campaign starting every spring, but he and his army returned to Ghazni and the Hindu Kush base before monsoons arrived in the northwestern part of the subcontinent. He retracted each time, only extending Islamic rule into western Punjab.

In 1017, the Iranian Islamic historian Al-Biruni was deported after a war that Mahmud of Ghazni won, to the northwest Indian subcontinent under Mahmud's rule. Al Biruni stayed in the region for about fifteen years, learnt Sanskrit, and translated many Indian texts, and wrote about Indian society, culture, sciences, and religion in Persian and Arabic. He stayed for some time in the Hindu Kush region, particularly near Kabul. In 1019, he recorded and described a solar eclipse in what is the modern era Laghman Province of Afghanistan through which Hindu Kush pass. Al Biruni also wrote about early history of the Hindu Kush region and Kabul kings, who ruled the region long before he arrived, but this history is inconsistent with other records available from that era. Al Biruni was supported by Sultan Mahmud. Al Biruni found it difficult to get access to Indian literature locally in the Hindu Kush area, and to explain this he wrote, "Mahmud utterly ruined the prosperity of the country, and performed wonderful exploits by which the Hindus became the atoms scattered in all directions, and like a tale of old in the mouth of the people. (...) This is the reason, too, why Hindu sciences have retired far from those parts of the country conquered by us, and have fled to places which our hand cannot yet reach, to Kashmir, Benares and other places".

In the late 12th century, the historically influential Ghurid empire led by Mu'izz al-Din ruled the Hindu Kush region. He was influential in seeding the Delhi Sultanate, shifting the base of his Sultanate from south of the Hindu Kush range and Ghazni towards the Yamuna River and Delhi. He thus helped bring Islamic rule to the northern plains of the Indian subcontinent. In the Mongol invasion of the Khwarazmian Empire, Genghis Khan invaded the region from the northeast in one of his many conquests to create the huge Mongol Empire.

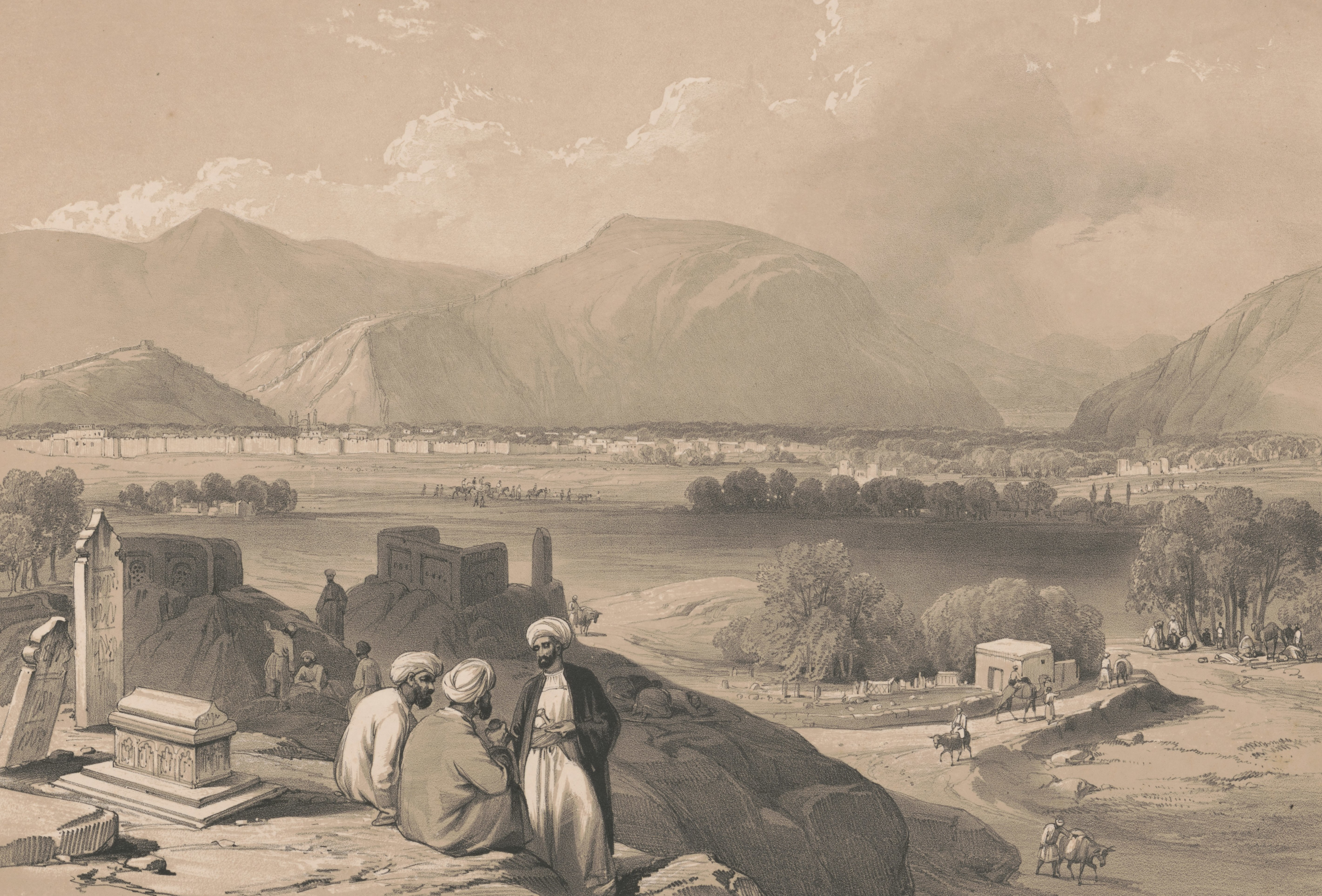
Kabul in the 19th century

The Moroccan traveler Ibn Battuta arrived in the Delhi Sultanate by passing through the Hindu Kush. The mountain passes of the Hindu Kush range were used by Timur and his army and they crossed to launch the 1398 invasion of the northern Indian subcontinent. Timur, also known as Temur or Tamerlane in Western scholarly literature, marched with his army to Delhi, plundering and killing all the way. He arrived in the capital Delhi with his army. Then he carried the wealth and the captured slaves, returning to his capital through the Hindu Kush.

Babur, the founder of the Mughal Empire, was a patrilineal descendant of Timur with roots in Central Asia. He first established himself and his army in Kabul and the Hindu Kush region. In 1526, he made his move into north India, and won the Battle of Panipat, ending the last Delhi Sultanate dynasty, and starting the era of the Mughals.

==== Slavery ====
Slavery, as with all major ancient and medieval societies, has been a part of Central Asia and South Asia history. The Hindu Kush mountain passes connected the slave markets of Central Asia with slaves seized in South Asia. The seizure and transportation of slaves from the Indian subcontinent became intense in and after the 8th century CE, with evidence suggesting that the slave transport involved "hundreds of thousands" of slaves from India in different periods of Islamic rule era. According to John Coatsworth and others, the slave trading operations during the pre-Akbar Mughal and Delhi Sultanate era "sent thousands of Hindus every year north to Central Asia to pay for horses and other goods". However, the interaction between Central Asia and South Asia through the Hindu Kush was not limited to slavery, it included trading in food, goods, horses and weapons.

The practice of raiding tribes, hunting, and kidnapping people for slave trading continued through the 19th century, at an extensive scale, around the Hindu Kush. According to a British Anti-Slavery Society report of 1874, the governor of Faizabad, Mir Ghulam Bey, kept 8,000 horses and cavalrymen who routinely captured non-Muslims as well as Shia Muslims as slaves. Others alleged to be involved in the slave trade were feudal lords such as Ameer Sheer Ali. The isolated communities in the Hindu Kush were one of the targets of these slave-hunting expeditions.

=== Modern era ===
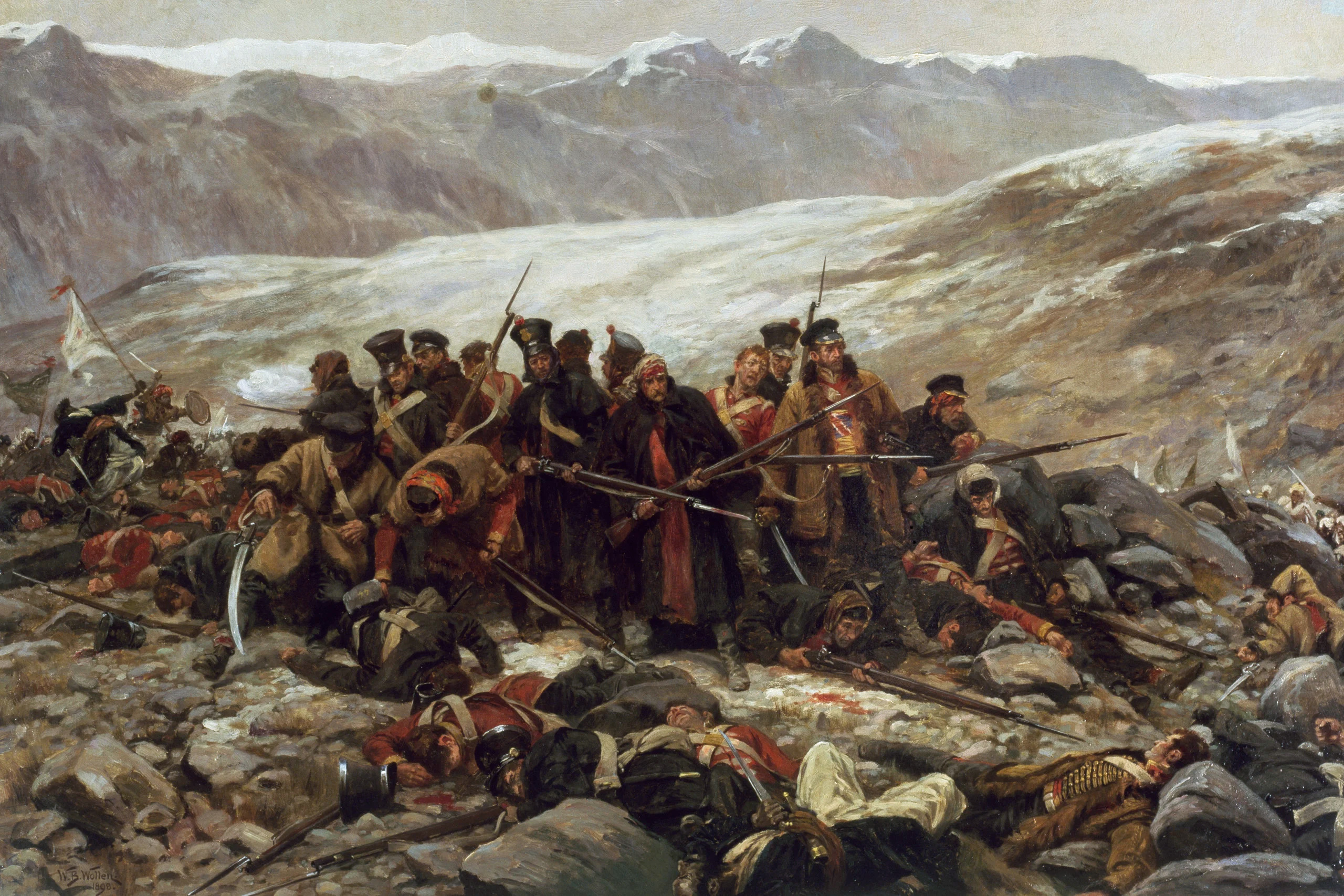
The Last Stand of the 44th Regiment at Gundamuck by William Barnes Wollen. The last stand of the 44th Foot, during the 1842 retreat from Kabul

The people of Kafiristan had practiced ancient polytheistic traditions until the 1896 invasion and conversion to Islam at the hands of Afghans under Amir Abdur Rahman Khan.

==== British era ====
The Hindu Kush served as a geographical barrier to the British Empire, leading to a paucity of information and scarce direct interaction between the British colonial officials and Central Asian peoples. The British had to rely on tribal chiefs, Sadozai and Barakzai noblemen for information, and they generally downplayed the reports of slavery and other violence for geo-political strategic considerations. The first British invasion of Afghanistan ended in disaster in 1842, when 16,000 British soldiers and camp followers were massacred as they retreated through the Hindu Kush back to India.

==== After 1947 ====
In the colonial era, the Hindu Kush was considered, informally, the dividing line between Russian and British areas of influence in Afghanistan. During the Cold War the Hindu Kush range became a strategic theatre, especially during the 1980s when Soviet forces and their Afghan allies fought the Afghan mujahideen channelled through Pakistan. After the Soviet withdrawal and the end of the Cold War, many mujahideen morphed into Taliban and al-Qaeda forces imposing a strict interpretation of Islamic law (Sharia), with Kabul, these mountains, and other parts of Afghanistan as their base. Other Mujahideen joined the Northern Alliance to oppose the Taliban rule.

After the 11 September 2001 terror attacks in New York City and Washington D.C., the American and ISAF campaign against Al Qaeda and their Taliban allies made the Hindu Kush once again a militarised conflict zone.

== Climate change ==
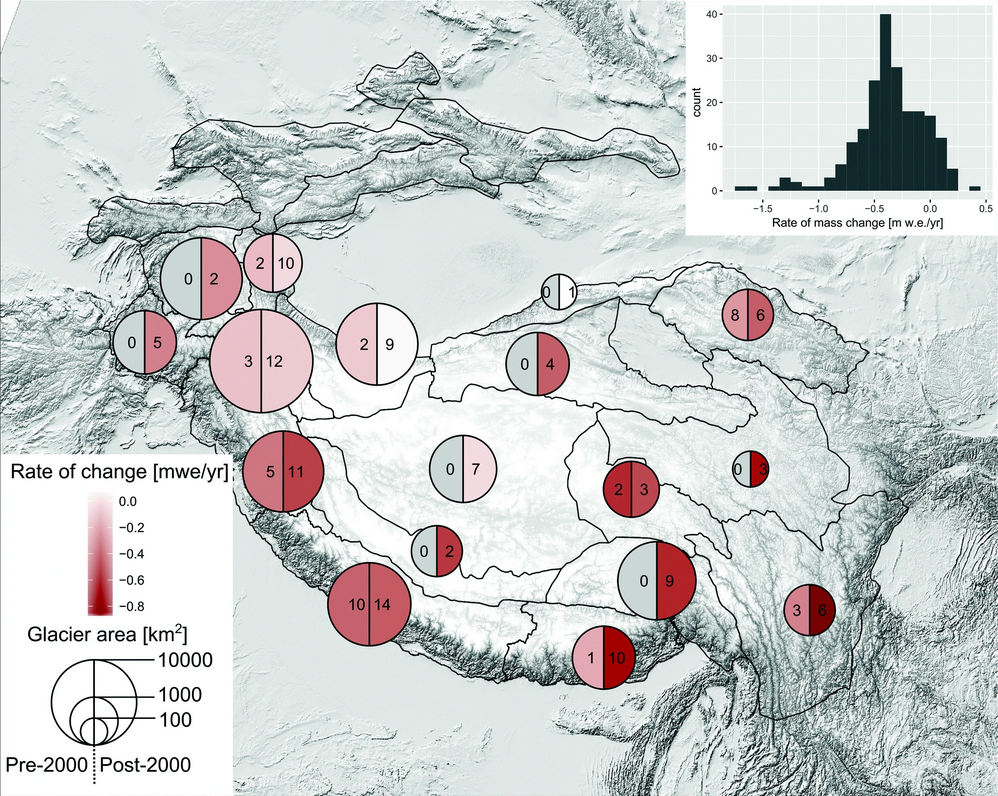
Observed glacier mass loss in the HKH since the 20th century.

The 2019 Hindu Kush Himalaya Assessment concluded that between 1901 and 2014, the Hindu Kush Himalaya (or HKH) region had already experienced warming of 0.1 °C per decade, with the warming rate accelerating to 0.2 °C per decade over the past 50 years. Over the past 50 years, the frequency of warm days and nights had also increased by 1.2 days and 1.7 nights per decade, while the frequency of extreme warm days and nights had increased by 1.26 days and 2.54 nights per decade. There was also a corresponding decline of 0.5 cold days, 0.85 extreme cold days, 1 cold night, and 2.4 extreme cold nights per decade. The length of the growing season has increased by 4.25 days per decade.

There is less conclusive evidence of light precipitation becoming less frequent while heavy precipitation became both more frequent and more intense. Finally, since 1970s glaciers have retreated everywhere in the region beside Karakoram, eastern Pamir, and western Kunlun, where there has been an unexpected increase in snowfall. Glacier retreat had been followed by an increase in the number of glacial lakes, some of which may be prone to dangerous floods.

In the future, if the Paris Agreement goal of 1.5 °C of global warming is not exceeded, warming in the HKH will be at least 0.3 °C higher, and at least 0.7 °C higher in the hotspots of northwest Himalaya and Karakoram. If the Paris Agreement goals are broken, then the region is expected to warm by 1.7–2.4 °C in the near future (2036–2065) and by 2.2–3.3 °C (2066–2095) near the end of the century under the "intermediate" Representative Concentration Pathway 4.5 (RCP4.5).

Under the high-warming RCP8.5 scenario where the annual emissions continue to increase for the rest of the century, the expected regional warming is 2.3–3.2 °C and 4.2–6.5 °C, respectively. Under all scenarios, winters will warm more than the summers, and the Tibetan Plateau, the central Himalayan Range, and the Karakoram will continue to warm more than the rest of the region. Climate change will also lead to the degradation of up to 81% of the region's permafrost by the end of the century.

Future precipitation is projected to increase as well, but CMIP5 models struggle to make specific projections due to the region's topography: the most certain finding is that the monsoon precipitation in the region will increase by 4–12% in the near future and by 4–25% in the long term. There has also been modelling of the changes in snow cover, but it is limited to the end of century under the RCP 8.5 scenario: it projects declines of 30–50% in the Indus Basin, 50–60% in the Ganges basin, and 50–70% in the Brahmaputra Basin, as the snowline elevation in these regions will rise by between 4.4 and 10.0 m/yr. There has been more extensive modelling of glacier trends: it is projected that one third of all glaciers in the extended HKH region will be lost by 2100 even if the warming is limited to 1.5 °C (with over half of that loss in the Eastern Himalaya region), while RCP 4.5 and RCP 8.5 are likely to lead to the losses of 50% and >67% of the region's glaciers over the same timeframe.

Glacier melt is projected to accelerate regional river flows until the amount of meltwater peaks around 2060, going into an irreversible decline afterwards. Since precipitation will continue to increase even as the glacier meltwater contribution declines, annual river flows are only expected to diminish in the western basins where contribution from the monsoon is low: however, irrigation and hydropower generation would still have to adjust to greater interannual variability and lower pre-monsoon flows in all of the region's rivers.

=== Future development and adaptation ===
A range of adaptation efforts are already undertaken across the HKH region: however, they suffer from underinvestment and insufficient coordination between the various state, institutional and other non-state efforts, and need to be "urgently" strengthened in order to be commensurate with the challenges ahead.

The 2019 Hindu Kush Himalaya Assessment outlined three main "storylines" for the region between now and 2080: "business-as-usual" (or "muddling through"), with no significant change from the current trends and development/adaptation initiatives proceeding as they do now; "downhill", where the intensity of global climate change is high, local initiatives fail and regional cooperation breaks down; and "prosperous", where extensive cooperation allows region's communities to weather "moderate" climate change and increase their living standards while also preserving the region's biodiversity. In addition, it described two alternate pathways through which the "prosperous" future can be achieved: the first focuses on top-down, large-scale development and the latter describes a bottom-up, decentralized alternative.

Pathway 1
Actions	Benefits				Need		Risk
Actions	Economic	Social	Environmental/climate	Cross sectoral	Finance and human resources	Governance	Source
Large hydro power generating capacity	Leapfrog in economic prosperity for the region as a whole, high potential for power trade	New skill development, diversified livelihood options	Air pollution reduction, both adaptation and mitigation	Large water storage to manage seasonal variability and strategic cross-sector allocation	Large corporate, global finance, sustained climate finance	HKH institution, regional tariff, cross-border policy coordination	Lack of transboundary sustainable political cooperation; lack of cross-sector water sharing formal arrangements; lack of ecosystem-based design of reservoirs/power plants; public acceptance, silt accumulation
HKH and non-HKH electric grid	Very high economic prosperity for the region and beyond	New skill, non-farm diversified livelihood options	Unplanned local resource extraction will decrease	Reliable power supply for all sectors	Large corporate, global finance, climate finance	HKH electric distribution corporation	Transboundary sustainable political cooperation;lack of ecosystem-based design
HKH ICT (information and communications technology) network	Boost to regional and local economic growth	New skill, non-farm diversified livelihood options	Connectivity across mountainous terrain without ecological impact	Extent of market cutting across sectors and regions	Large corporations, global finance, climate finance	HKH communications corporation	Transboundary sustainable political cooperation; lack of biodiversity-sensitive design
Cross-border trade corridors e.g., silk route re-development	Income, consumption, production leapfrogs as per comparative advantage, benefit to large-scale tourism industry	Food security, energy security, health service, social interdependence, non-farm livelihood generation	Comparative advantage will lead to biodiversity conservation, enhance payment for ecosystem service	Multiple opportunities across sectors emerge	Regional, global	HKH trade authority	Transboundary sustainable political cooperation; lack of biodiversity-sensitive design in transport corridor development
Large water storage and supply	Income, consumption, production leapfrog	Food security, energy security, non-farm water sector livelihood generation	Less GLOF, less flash floods, pump storage facility	Multiple opportunities across sectors emerge	Regional, global	HKH water council	Transboundary sustainable political cooperation; lack of ecosystem-sensitive development
Large water treatment facilities	Leapfrog in water resource management	Water security, non-farm water sector livelihood generation	Reduction in waste disposal	Multiple opportunities across sectors emerge	Regional, global	HKH water council	Transboundary sustainable political cooperation; lack of ecosystem sensitive development
Large-scale urbanization	Leapfrog in economic growth centers	Non-farm water sector livelihood generation	Reserve nature for biodiversity conservation	Multiple opportunities across sectors emerge	Local, national, regional, and global	National urban development authorities	Lack of ecosystem-sensitive development
Large contract farming	Leapfrog in farm-level activity and income	Income, livelihood security	Investment in environmental management	Farming based industrial/trade growth	Local, national, regional, and global	National farming development authorities	Lack of ecosystem-sensitive development; lack of public acceptance, possibility of food crop reduction, crop monoculture

Pathway 2
Actions	Benefits				Need		Risk
Actions	Economic	Social	Environmental/climate	Cross sectoral	Finance and human resources	Governance	Source
Distributed small hydro power generating capacity	Incremental national, local economic prosperity through self-sufficiency	Traditional skill utilization	Air pollution reduction, both adaptation and mitigation	Water flow uninterrupted	Small to medium national scale finance, programmatic finance by bundling, climate finance	Community level, local, national, multilevel coordination for tariff, etc. to ensure equity	Lack of local capacity for multi-level governance; lack of upstream- downstream water sharing arrangements; lack of ecosystem-based design
Micro grids	Local economic prosperity	Lack of ecosystem-sensitive development	Small infrastructure with less environmental impact	Reliable power supply for target group	Specialized medium-scale global finance, climate finance	Private, local electric distribution companies	Without multilevel governance, inequality may arise across social groups; not a tried and tested technology; maintenance will need local skill building
National ICT (information and communications technology) network	Incremental national growth	Lack of ecosystem-sensitive development	National connectivity in mountainous terrain improves without ecological impact	Extent of market cutting across sectors	National/global investment negotiated competitively	National institutions	Lack of local/national skill, national negotiation capacity
National culture based products, tourism	Incremental progress	Traditional skill, non-farm livelihood	Environmental conservation	Tourism related infrastructure expansion	Local, national	Local and national institutions	Lack of capacity to integrate with the rest of the world
Decentralized water storage and supply	Incremental progress	Traditional systems to be revived	Environmental conservation	Local infrastructure expansion	Local, national	Local, national	New modern technology to be developed; lack of local/national skill
Decentralized water treatment	Incremental Progress	Traditional systems to be revived	Environmental conservation	Local infrastructure expansion	Local, national	Local, national	New modern technology to be developed; lack of local/national skill
Small settlement planning	Less displacement cost	Less displacement and migration	No change in large-scale land use pattern	Local infrastructure expansion	Local, national	Local, national regulations	Localized environmental impact might go unregulated
Small farming practices	Incremental progress	Continuation of traditional practices	No change in large-scale land use pattern	Local infrastructure expansion	Local, national	Local, national regulations	Localized environmental impact might go unregulated

== Ethnography ==
Pre-Islamic populations of the Hindu Kush included Shins, Yeshkuns, Chiliss, Neemchas Koli, Palus, Gaware, and Krammins.

== See also ==
- 2002 Hindu Kush earthquakes
- 2005 Hindu Kush earthquake
- Geography of Afghanistan
- Geography of Pakistan
- Hindustan
- Karakoram
- List of highest mountains (a list of mountains above 7,200m)
- List of mountain ranges
- Mount Imeon
- Paropamisus Mountains
- A Short Walk in the Hindu Kush
