= Lataband Pass =

Pakistani mountain pass

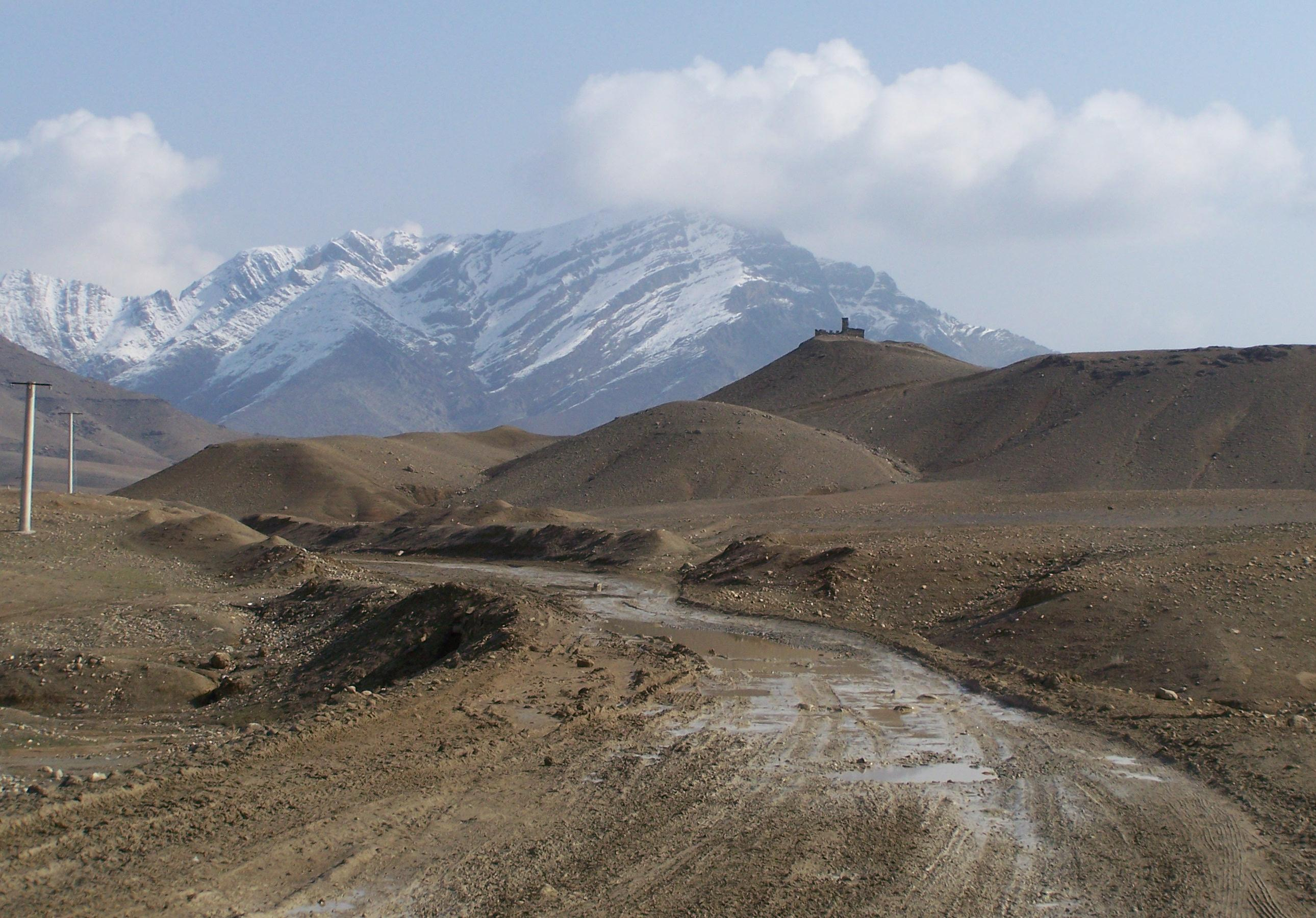
- Lataband Road
- Interactive map of Lataband Pass
- Elevation: 2,125 m (6,972 ft)

Location
- Location: Afghanistan
- Range: Hindu Kush
- Coordinates: 34°31′16″N 69°33′40″E

The Lataband Pass or Kotal-e Latah Band, in Pashto کوتل لته بند, (elevation: 2,125 m or 6,972 ft) is a mountain pass connecting Kabul and Jalalabad on the way to Pakistan in the Karkacha hills between Seh Baba and Butkhak in the Hindukush Range. The name, Lataband, means 'Mountain of Rags' as there was an old belief that people who hung bits of clothing on the bushes along the way, had their wishes granted.

== Description ==
The Lataband Pass is a difficult and dangerous pass which was on the only road suitable for carriages or motor vehicles between Kabul and Jalalabad until the longer, but less precipitous route via the Khord Kabul was used by the Mughuls in the 16th century. An integral part of the ancient Silk Road, it was still in use until 1960, when the route via Tang-e Gharu route was finally completed and paved. This new road reduced travel time between Kabul and the Pakistan border from two days to only a few hours. It was for many centuries an important link on the trade route between Central Asia and South Asia, and a strategic military location.

== History ==
"A military post was established at this point by the British during the Second Afghan War (1878–80), which was held by Colonel Hudson while Afghan forces held the nearby post of Sherpur. Hudson’s forces were surrounded but could communicate by heliograph in clear weather (an apparatus which used a movable mirror to reflect sunlight to signal to distant points). Colonel Hudson’s force at Lataband, together with troops stationed at the garrison at Jagdalak near the pass, fought against the Tezin Ghilzais who occupied the surrounding hills and eventually drove them off."
