= List of mountains in Afghanistan =

Following is a list of mountains in Afghanistan:

== List ==
Rank	Name	Elevation	Prominence	Mountain Range
1	Noshaq	7,492 metres (24,580 ft)	2,024 metres (6,640 ft)	Hindu Kush
2	Shah Dhar	7,038 metres (23,091 ft)	1,562 metres (5,125 ft)	Hindu Kush
3	Lunkho e Dosare	6,901 metres (22,641 ft)	1,671 metres (5,482 ft)	Hindu Kush
4	Kuh-e Bandaka	6,812 metres (22,349 ft)	2,834 metres (9,298 ft)	Hindu Kush
5	Koh-e Keshni Khan	6,755 metres (22,162 ft)	292 metres (958 ft)	Hindu Kush
6	Sakar Sar	6,272 metres (20,577 ft)		Karakorum
7	Kohe Mondi	6,248 metres (20,499 ft)		Hindu Kush
8	Mir Samir	5,809 metres (19,058 ft)		Hindu Kush
9	Concord Peak	5,469 metres (17,943 ft)	569 metres (1,867 ft)	Pamir Mountains
10	Kuh-e Chuk Shakh	5,467 metres (17,936 ft)	2,444 metres (8,018 ft)	Hindu Kush
11	Kuh-e Safed Khers	5,326 metres (17,474 ft)		
12	Kharkush	4,805 metres (15,764 ft)		Hindu Kush
13	Mount Sikaram	4,755 metres (15,600 ft)	2,295 metres (7,530 ft)	Hindu Kush
14	Koh-e Hindukush	4,150 metres (13,620 ft)		Hindu Kush
15	Kuh-e Kallat	4,090 metres (13,420 ft)		Pamir Mountains
16	Koh e Alburz	3,191 metres (10,469 ft)		Hindu Kush
17	Takur Ghar	3,191 metres (10,469 ft)		Arma Mountains
