= List of ultras of the Karakoram and Hindu Kush =

This is a list of all the ultra-prominent peaks (with topographic prominence greater than 1,500 metres) in the Karakoram, Hindu Kush and neighbouring ranges. The list includes 4 of the 14 8000m summits, all in the Karakoram, including the second highest mountain in the world, K2. There are a further 19 Ultras in the Karakoram and 5 in the Hindu Kush over 7,000m. The ultras of the Himalayas lie to the south east and are listed separately. To the north are the Pamirs, and to the east the mountains of Tibet.

Despite their height, only 3 mountains are among the 100 most prominent mountains, K2, in 22nd place, Tirich Mir (30) and Batura Sar (77). Two more are on the list of 120 most prominent mountains: Buni Zom (117) and Kuh-e Bandaka (118).

== Karakoram ==
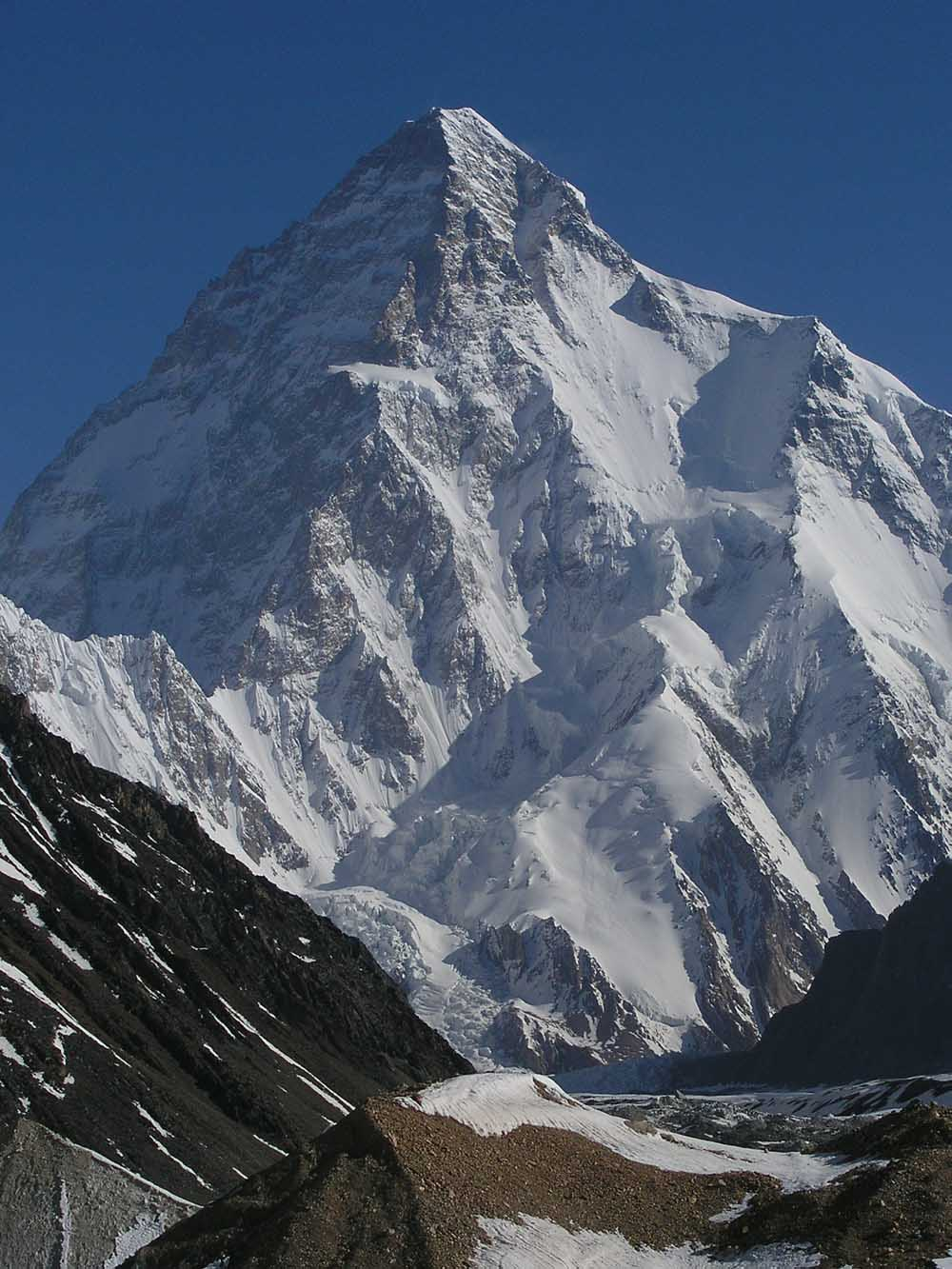
K2, Pakistan

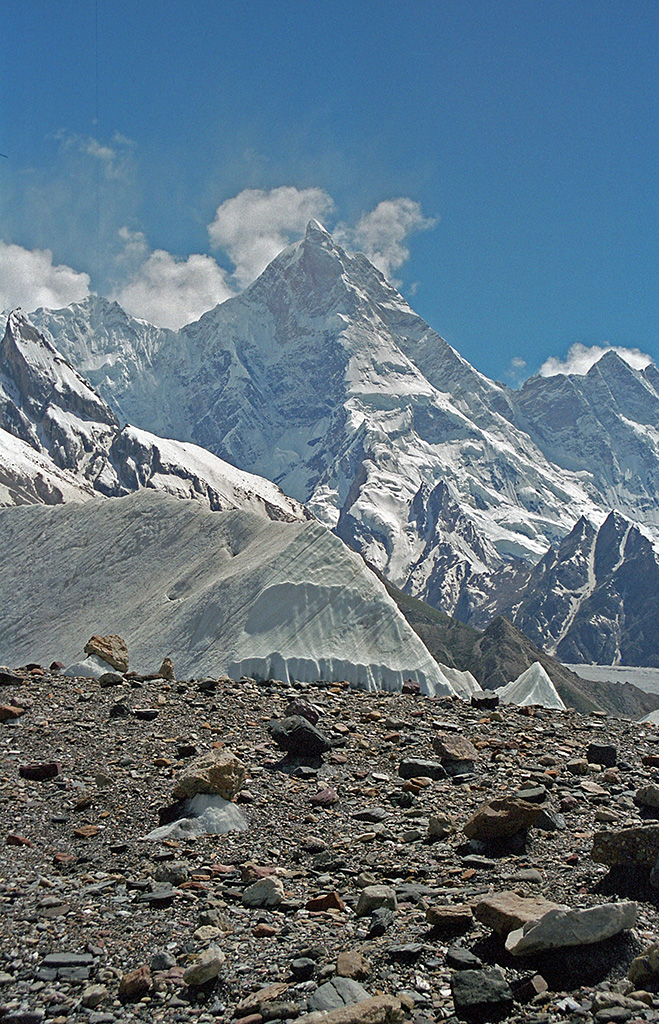
Masherbrum (K1), Pakistan

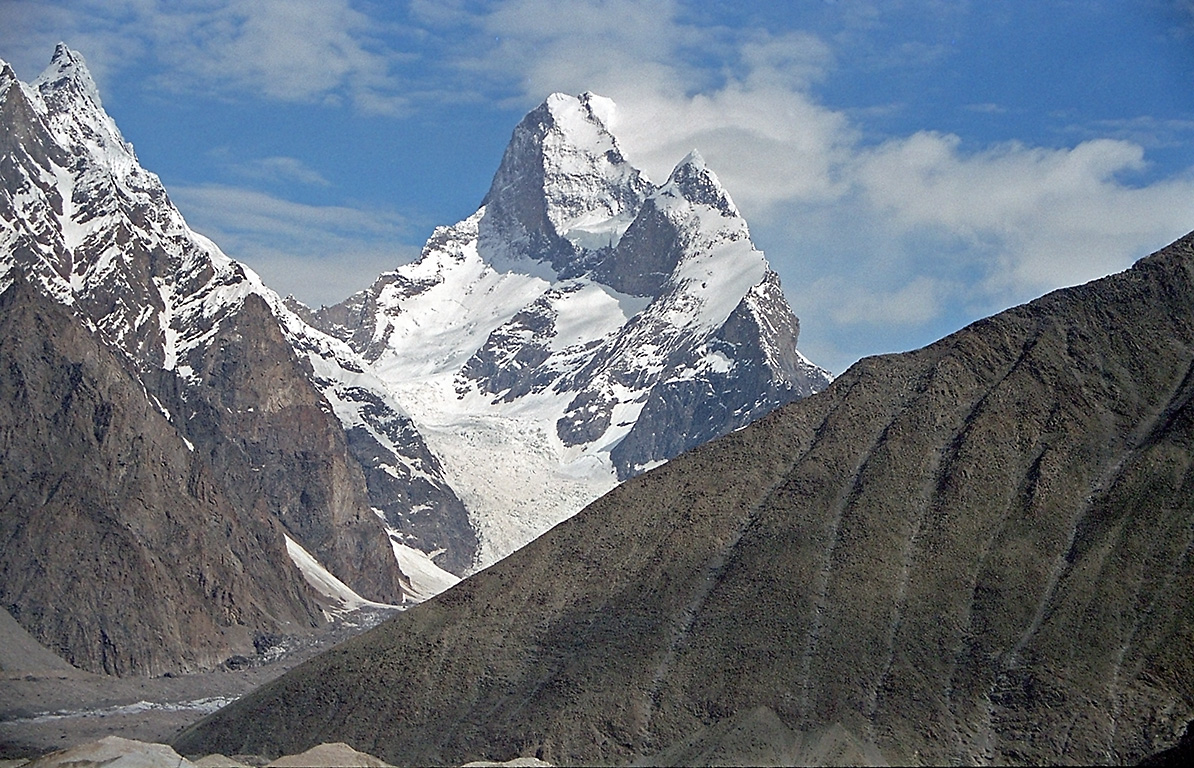
Muztagh Tower, Pakistan

| No | Peak | Country | Elevation (m) | Prominence (m) | Col (m) |
|---|---|---|---|---|---|
| 1 | K2 | Pakistan / China, | 8,614 | 4,020 | 4594 |
| 2 | Batura Sar | Pakistan, | 7,795 | 3,118 | 4677 |
| 3 | Rakaposhi | Pakistan, | 7,788 | 2,818 | 4970 |
| 4 | Distaghil Sar | Pakistan, | 7,885 | 2,525 | 5360 |
| 5 | Masherbrum | Control by Pakistan, | 7,821 | 2,457 | 5364 |
| 6 | Saser Kangri | Ladakh,India | 7,672 | 2,304 | 5368 |
| 7 | Haramosh Peak | Pakistan, | 7,397 | 2,277 | 5120 |
| 8 | Karun Kuh | Pakistan, | 6,977 | 2,240 | 4737 |
| 9 | Malubiting | Pakistan, | 7,453 | 2,193 | 5260 |
| 10 | Saltoro Kangri | India | 7,742 | 2,160 | 5582 |
| 11 | Gasherbrum I | Pakistan / China; | 8,080 | 2,155 | 5925 |
| 12 | Surukwat Kangri | China | 6,792 | 1,995 | 4797 |
| 13 | K12 | India | 7,428 | 1,978 | 5450 |
| 14 | K6 | Pakistan, | 7,282 | 1,962 | 5320 |
| 15 | The Crown | China | 7,295 | 1,919 | 5376 |
| 16 | Baintha Brakk | Pakistan | 7,285, | 1,891 | 5394 |
| 17 | Mamostong Kangri | India, | 7,516 | 1,803 | 5713 |
| 18 | Khunyang Chhish | Pakistan, | 7,852 | 1,765 | 6087 |
| 19 | Kharchanai | China | 6,436 | 1,743 | 4693 |
| 20 | Muztagh Tower | Pakistan / China | 7,276 | 1,710 | 5566 |
| 21 | Teram Kangri | India / China | 7,464 | 1,703 | 5761 |
| 22 | Broad Peak | Pakistan / China | 8,051 | 1,701 | 6350 |
| 23 | Mazar Shan | China | 6,542 | 1,674 | 4868 |
| 24 | Kanjut Sar | Pakistan, | 7,760 | 1,660 | 6100 |
| 25 | Chogolisa | Pakistan, | 7,668 | 1,624 | 6044 |
| 26 | Bilchhar Dobani | Pakistan, | 6,143 | 1,601 | 4542 |
| 27 | Kalmuk Kangri | China | 6,952 | 1,600 | 5352 |
| 28 | Durbin Kangri | China | 6,824 | 1,579 | 5245 |
| 29 | Kezhen Peak | China | 7,038 | 1,578 | 5460 |
| 30 | HP Marshakala Range | Pakistan, | 5,828 | 1,564 | 4264 |
| 31 | Burnag Kangri | China | 6,821 | 1,529 | 5292 |
| 32 | Gasherbrum II | Pakistan / China | 8,034 | 1,523 | 6511 |

== Hindu Kush ==
| No | Peak | Country | Elevation (m) | Prominence (m) | Col (m) |
|---|---|---|---|---|---|
| 1 | Tirich Mir | Pakistan | 7,706 | 3,908 | 3798 |
| 2 | Kuh-e Bandaka | Afghanistan | 6,812 | 2,834 | 3978 |
| 3 | HP Kuh-e Safad Khers | Afghanistan | 5,325 | 2,470 | 2855 |
| 4 | Kuh-e Chuk Shakh | Afghanistan | 5,467 | 2,444 | 3023 |
| 5 | Noshaq | Afghanistan / Pakistan | 7,492 | 2,024 | 5468 |
| 6 | Saraghrar | Pakistan | 7,340 | 1,979 | 5370 |
| 7 | Kuh-e Fergardi | Afghanistan | 5,096 | 1,850 | 3246 |
| 8 | Shayaz | Pakistan | 6,026 | 1,797 | 4229 |
| 9 | Point 5120 | Afghanistan | 5,120 | 1,775 | 3345 |
| 10 | Kuh-e Shashgal | Afghanistan | 6,290 | 1,758 | 4532 |
| 11 | Udren Zom | Pakistan | 7,140 | 1,620 | 5520 |
| 12 | Shah Dhar | Afghanistan / Pakistan | 7,038 | 1,562 | 5476 |
| 13 | Lunkho e Dosare | Afghanistan / Pakistan | 6,901 | 1,561 | 5340 |

== South of the Khyber Pass ==
| No | Peak | Country | Elevation (m) | Prominence (m) | Col (m) |
|---|---|---|---|---|---|
| 1 | Sikaram Sar | Afghanistan / Pakistan | 4,755 | 2,295 | 2460 |
| 2 | HP Koh-i-Baba | Afghanistan | 5,048 | 2,111 | 2937 |
| 3 | Obasta Tsukai | Pakistan | 3,452 | 1,813 | 1628 |
| 4 | Ras Koh | Pakistan | 3,003 | 1,797 | 1206 |
| 5 | Shah Tus Aqa Ghar | Afghanistan | 4,803 | 1,734 | 3069 |
| 6 | Mizri Ghar | Pakistan | 3,111 | 1,618 | 1493 |
| 7 | Loe Nekan | Pakistan | 3,575 | 1,597 | 1985 |
| 8 | Kuh-e Soltan Saheb | Afghanistan | 4,270 | 1,513 | 2757 |
| 9 | Kuh-e Sefid | Afghanistan | 4,750 | 1,510 | 3240 |

== Hindu Raj ==
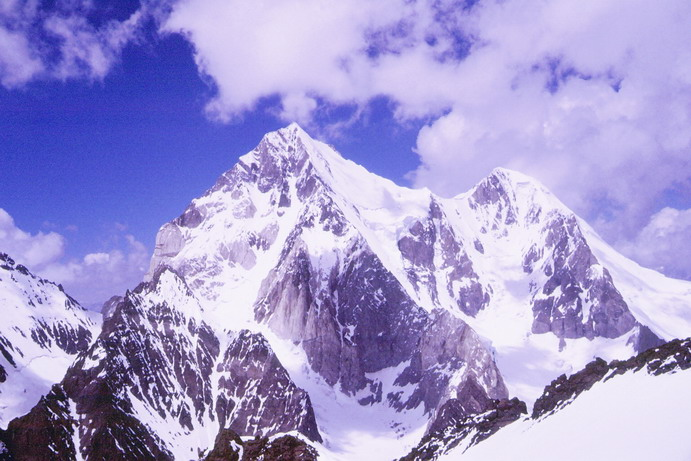
Buni Zom, Pakistan

| No | Peak | Country | Elevation (m) | Prominence (m) | Col (m) |
|---|---|---|---|---|---|
| 1 | Buni Zom | Pakistan | 6,542 | 2,845 | 3697 |
| 2 | Koyo Zom | Pakistan | 6,872 | 2,562 | 4310 |
| 3 | Ghamubar Zom | Pakistan | 6,518 | 2,133 | 4385 |
| 4 | Chiantar Sar | Pakistan | 6,416 | 1,841 | 4575 |
| 5 | Shah Dok | Pakistan | 6,320 | 1,815 | 4505 |
| 6 | Thalo Zom | Pakistan | 6,050 | 1,799 | 4251 |
| 7 | Falak Sher | Pakistan | 5,918 | 1,558 | 4360 |

== Sources ==
- Afghanistan & Pakistan
- Karakoram etc
- Map
