= List of mountain peaks by prominence =

Chart showing the relationship between the 100 peaks with highest prominence in the world. (In the SVG version, hover over a peak to highlight its parent(s) and click it to view its article.)

This is a list of mountain peaks ordered by their topographic prominence.

== Terminology ==
The prominence of a peak is the minimum height of climb to the summit on any route from a higher peak, or from sea level if there is no higher peak. The lowest point on that route is the col.

For full definitions and explanations of topographic prominence, key col, and parent, see topographic prominence. In particular, the different definitions of the parent of a peak are addressed at length in that article. Height on the other hand simply means elevation of the summit above sea level.

Regarding parents, the prominence parent of peak A can be found by dividing the island or region in question into territories, by tracing the runoff from the key col (mountain pass) of every peak that is more prominent than peak A. The parent is the peak whose territory peak A resides in.

The encirclement parent is found by tracing the contour below peak A's key col and picking the highest mountain in that region. This is easier to determine than the prominence parent; however, it tends to give non-intuitive results for peaks with very low cols such as Jabal Shams which is #111 in the list.

Either sort of parent of a typical very high-prominence peak such as Denali will lie far away from the peak itself, reflecting the independence of the peak.

Most sources (and the table below) define no parent for island and landmass highpoints; others treat Mount Everest as the parent of every such peak with the world ocean as the "key col".

== Prominence table ==
The following table lists the Earth's 125 most topographically prominent summits. Of these, Indonesia has the most, with 13. Close behind it are China and the United States with 12 each.

The 125 most topographically prominent summits on Earth
No.	Peak	Range (or island)	Location	Coordinates	Prominence (m)	Height (m)	Col (m)	Encirclement parent	Prominence parent
1.	Mount Everest	Himalayas	China; Nepal	27.9881°N 86.925°E	8,848.86	8,848.86	0	None	None
2.	Aconcagua	Andes	Argentina	32.6531°S 70.0117°W	6,960.8	6,960.8	0	None	None
3.	Denali / Mount McKinley^{*}	Alaska Range	United States	63.0692°N 151.0064°W	6,155	6,190	35	Aconcagua	Aconcagua
4.	Mount Kilimanjaro^{*}	Eastern Rift mountains	Tanzania	3.0667°S 37.3592°E	5,885	5,895	10	Everest	Everest
5.	Pico Simón Bolívar	Sierra Nevada de Santa Marta	Colombia	10.8383°N 73.6867°W	5,529	5,720	191	Aconcagua	Aconcagua
6.	Mount Logan	Saint Elias Mountains	Canada	60.5672°N 140.4028°W	5,250	5,959	709	Denali	Denali
7.	Pico de Orizaba	Trans-Mexican Volcanic Belt	Mexico	19.03°N 97.27°W	4,922	5,636	714	Mount Logan	Mount Logan
8.	Vinson Massif	Sentinel Range	Antarctica	78.5256°S 85.6172°W	4,892	4,892	0	None	None
9.	Puncak Jaya	Sudirman Range, New Guinea	Indonesia	4.08°S 137.18°E	4,884	4,884	0	None	None
10.	Mount Elbrus	Caucasus Mountains	Russia	43.35254°N 42.437875°E	4,741	5,642	901	Everest	Everest
11.	Mont Blanc/Monte Bianco	Alps	France; Italy	45.8328°N 6.865°E	4,695	4,808	113	Everest	Everest
12.	Mount Damavand	Alborz	Iran	35.9553°N 52.1092°E	4,667	5,610	943	Mount Elbrus	Mount Elbrus
13.	Klyuchevskaya Sopka	Kamchatka	Russia	56.07°N 160.63°E	4,649	4,750	101	Everest	Everest
14.	Nanga Parbat	Himalayas	Pakistan	35.2392°N 74.59°E	4,608	8,125	3,517	Everest	Everest
15.	Mauna Kea	Hawaii, Hawaiian Islands	United States	19.8206°N 155.4681°W	4,205	4,205	0	None	None
16.	Jengish Chokusu	Tian Shan	China; Kyrgyzstan	42.0347°N 80.1287°E	4,148	7,439	3,291	Everest	Everest
17.	Bogda Peak	Bogda Shan	China	43.8016°N 88.335°E	4,122	5,445	1,323	Everest	Everest
18.	Chimborazo	Cordillera Occidental	Ecuador	1.4692°S 78.8175°W	4,118	6,263	2,145	Aconcagua	Aconcagua
19.	Namcha Barwa	Himalayas	China	29.6306°N 95.0553°E	4,106	7,782	3,676	Everest	Everest
20.	Mount Kinabalu	Crocker Range, Borneo	Malaysia	6.075°N 116.5586°E	4,095	4,095	0	None	None
21.	Mount Rainier	Cascade Range	United States	46.8517°N 121.7603°W	4,029	4,393	370	Denali	Orizaba
22.	K2	Karakoram	China; Pakistan	35.8811°N 76.5133°E	4,020	8,611	4,594	Everest	Everest
23.	Ras Dashen	Simien Mountains	Ethiopia	13.2367°N 38.3725°E	3,997	4,550	553	Kilimanjaro	Kilimanjaro
24.	Volcán Tajumulco	Sierra Madre de Chiapas	Guatemala	15.03°N 91.9°W	3,980	4,220	240	Denali	Orizaba
25.	Pico Bolívar	Sierra Nevada de Mérida	Venezuela	8.54086°N 71.0465°W	3,957	4,981	1,024	Aconcagua	Chimborazo
26.	Mount Fairweather	Saint Elias Mountains	Canada; United States	58.9065°N 137.5266°W	3,946	4,671	722	Mount Logan	Mount Logan
27.	Yushan	Yushan Range	Taiwan	23.47°N 120.95727°E	3,952	3,952	0	None	None
28.	Mount Stanley	Rwenzori Mountains	DR Congo; Uganda	0.3858°N 29.8717°E	3,951	5,109	1,158	Kilimanjaro	Kilimanjaro
29.	Kanchenjunga	Himalayas	India; Nepal	27.7030031°N 88.1473531°E	3,922	8,586	4,664	Everest	Everest
30.	Tirich Mir	Hindu Kush	Pakistan	36.2458°N 71.8439°E	3,908	7,708	3,800	Everest	K2
31.	Mount Cameroon	Cameroon line	Cameroon	4.2167°N 9.1725°E	3,901	4,040	139	Kilimanjaro	Stanley
32.	Mount Kenya	Eastern Rift mountains	Kenya	0.1°S 37.2°E	3,825	5,199	1,374	Kilimanjaro	Kilimanjaro
33.	Mount Kerinci	Barisan Mountains, Sumatra	Indonesia	1.696944°S 101.264444°E	3,805	3,805	0	None	None
34.	Mount Erebus	Ross Island	Antarctica	77.53°S 167.28°E	3,794	3,794	0	None	None
35.	Mount Fuji	Honshu	Japan	35.3606°N 138.7275°E	3,776	3,776	0	None	None
36.	Toubkal	Atlas Mountains	Morocco	31.0619°N 7.9161°W	3,757	4,167	410	Kilimanjaro	Stanley
37.	Cerro Chirripó	Cordillera de Talamanca	Costa Rica	9.4841°N 83.4887°W	3,727	3,820	93	Aconcagua	Chimborazo
38.	Mount Rinjani	Lombok, Lesser Sunda Islands	Indonesia	8.4167°S 116.4667°E	3,726	3,726	0	None	None
39.	Aoraki/Mount Cook	Southern Alps	New Zealand	43.595°S 170.1419°E	3,724	3,724	0	None	None
40.	Teide	Tenerife	Spain	28.27264°N 16.64361°W	3,715	3,715	0	None	None
41.	Mount Boising	Finisterre Range	Papua New Guinea	5.8°S 146.1°E	3,709	4,150	441	Puncak Jaya	Puncak Jaya
42.	Monte San Valentin	Andes	Chile	46.595°S 73.3458°W	3,696	4,058	362	Aconcagua	Aconcagua
43.	Gunnbjørn Fjeld	Watkins Range	Greenland	68.9195°N 29.89853°W	3,694	3,694	0	None	None
44.	Ojos del Salado	Andes	Argentina; Chile	27.1097°S 68.5414°W	3,688	6,893	3,205	Aconcagua	Aconcagua
45.	Semeru	Java	Indonesia	8.1°S 112.9167°E	3,676	3,676	0	None	None
46.	Ritacuba Blanco	Cordillera Oriental	Colombia	6.4942°N 72.2975°W	3,645	5,410	1,765	Aconcagua	Chimborazo
47.	Mount Gongga	Daxue Mountains	China	29.5958°N 101.8792°E	3,642	7,556	3,914	Everest	K2
48.	Mount Ararat	Armenian Highlands	Turkey	39.7019°N 44.2983°E	3,611	5,137	1,526	Damavand	Damavand
49.	Kongur Tagh	Kongur Shan	China	38.5939°N 75.3133°E	3,585	7,649	4,064	Everest	K2
50.	Mount Blackburn	Wrangell Mountains	United States	61.7319°N 143.4393°W	3,535	4,996	1,461	Mount Logan	Mount Logan
51.	Mount Hayes	Alaska Range	United States	63.6208°N 146.715°W	3,501	4,216	715	Denali	Denali
52.	Mount Latimojong	Sulawesi	Indonesia	3.385°S 120.0242°E	3,478	3,478	0	None	None
53.	Mount Saint Elias	Saint Elias Mountains	Canada; United States	60.2922°N 140.9314°W	3,448	5,489	2,041	Mount Logan	Mount Logan
54.	Mount Etna	Sicily	Italy	37.75083451°N 14.99322029°E	3,403	3,403	0	None	None
55.	Ismoil Somoni Peak	Pamir Mountains	Tajikistan	38.9427°N 72.0153°E	3,402	7,495	4,093	Everest	K2
56.	Dhaulagiri	Himalayas	Nepal	28.6967°N 83.49°E	3,357	8,167	4,810	K2	K2
57.	Mercedario	Cordillera de la Ramada	Argentina	31.9789°S 70.1128°W	3,353	6,720	3,367	Aconcagua	Aconcagua
58.	Lautaro	Andes	Chile	49.019°S 73.504°W	3,345	3,623	278	Aconcagua	Aconcagua
59.	Belukha Mountain	Altai Mountains	Kazakhstan; Russia	49.8069°N 86.5897°E	3,343	4,506	1,163	Everest	K2
60.	Monte San Lorenzo	Andes	Argentina; Chile	47.5917°S 72.3067°W	3,319	3,706	387	Aconcagua	Aconcagua
61.	Mount Karisimbi	Virunga Mountains	DR Congo; Rwanda	1.5°S 29.45°E	3,312	4,507	1,195	Mount Stanley	Mount Stanley
62.	Jabal An-Nabi Shu'ayb	Sarawat Mountains	Yemen	15.2792°N 43.9758°E	3,311	3,666	355	Everest	Ararat
63.	Mount Waddington	Coast Mountains	Canada	51.3736°N 125.2633°W	3,289	4,019	730	Mount Fairweather	Mount Fairweather
64.	Mulhacén	Sierra Nevada	Spain	37.0533°N 3.3114°W	3,285	3,479	194	Mont Blanc	Mont Blanc
65.	Mount Slamet	Java	Indonesia	7.239°S 109.22°E	3,284	3,432	144	Semeru	Semeru
66.	Sabalan	Sabalan	Iran	38.2669°N 47.8369°E	3,283	4,811	1,528	Mount Ararat	Mount Ararat
67.	Mount Marcus Baker	Chugach Mountains	United States	61.4378°N 147.751°W	3,269	3,991	747	Mount Hayes	Mount Hayes
68.	Sauyr Zhotasy	Saur Mountains	China; Kazakhstan	47.0492°N 85.5667°E	3,252	3,840	588	Everest	Belukha
69.	Cerro del Bolsón	Andes	Argentina	27.2142°S 66.0942°W	3,252	5,552	2,300	Aconcagua	Ojos del Salado
70.	Tomort	Tian Shan	China	43.0733°N 94.3467°E	3,243	4,886	1,643	Bogda Feng	Bogda Feng
71.	Jade Dragon Snow Mountain	Yun Range	China	27.0983°N 100.175°E	3,202	5,596	2,394	Everest	K2
72.	Mount Meru	Eastern Rift mountains	Tanzania	3.246781°S 36.76025°E	3,170	4,565	1,395	Mount Kenya	Mount Kenya
73.	Shiveluch	Kamchatka	Russia	56.653633°N 161.362967°E	3,168	3,307	139	Klyuchevskaya	Klyuchevskaya
74.	Nanda Devi	Himalayas	India	30.3739°N 79.9708°E	3,139	7,817	4,677	K2	Dhaulagiri
75.	Ichinsky	Sredinny Range	Russia	55.6778°N 157.7217°E	3,125	3,607	482	Klyuchevskaya	Klyuchevskaya
76.	Mount Lawu	Java	Indonesia	7.625°S 111.191667°E	3,118	3,265	147	Semeru	Semeru
77.	Batura Sar	Karakoram	Pakistan	36.51°N 74.5225°E	3,118	7,795	4,677	K2	K2
78.	Mount Siple	Siple Island	Antarctica	73.43°S 126.67°W	3,110	3,110	0	None	None
79.	Pico Duarte	Cordillera Central, Hispaniola	Dominican Republic	19.0331°N 71.0053°W	3,098	3,098	0	None	None
80.	Manaslu	Himalayas	Nepal	28.55°N 84.5597°E	3,092	8,163	5,071	Everest	Everest
81.	Mount Whitney	Sierra Nevada	United States	36.5786°N 118.2919°W	3,073	4,418	1,345	Orizaba	Orizaba
82.	Piton des Neiges	Réunion	France	21.0989°S 55.4789°E	3,069	3,069	0	None	None
83.	Raung	Java	Indonesia	8.125°S 114.0417°E	3,069	3,332	263	Semeru	Semeru
84.	Xuelian Feng	Tian Shan	China	42.2617°N 80.89°E	3,068	6,627	3,559	Jengish Chokusu	Jengish Chokusu
85.	Haleakalā	Maui, Hawaiian Islands	United States	20.718°N 156.25°W	3,055	3,055	0	None	None
86.	Mount Lucania	Saint Elias Mountains	Canada	61.0233°N 140.4656°W	3,046	5,226	2,180	Mount Logan	Mount Logan
87.	Mount Agung	Bali	Indonesia	8.3419°S 115.5078°E	3,031	3,031	0	None	None
88.	Mount Binaiya	Seram	Indonesia	3.1733°S 129.455°E	3,027	3,027	0	None	None
89.	Popocatepetl	Trans-Mexican Volcanic Belt	Mexico	19.023386°N 98.623434°W	3,020	5,400	2,380	Orizaba	Orizaba
90.	Jabal Soudah	Asir Mountains	Saudi Arabia	18.2672°N 42.3681°E	3,015	3,207	208	Jabal An-Nabi Shu'ayb	Jabal An-Nabi Shu'ayb
91.	Pico Basilé	Bioko, Cameroon Line	Equatorial Guinea	3.5833°N 8.7667°E	3,011	3,011	0	None	None
92.	Koryaksky	Sredinny Range	Russia	53.32°N 158.68°E	2,999	3,456	457	Klyuchevskaya	Klyuchevskaya
93.	Gangkhar Puensum	Himalayas	Bhutan; China	28.0469°N 90.455°E	2,995	7,570	4,575	Kangchenjunga	Kangchenjunga
94.	Mount Stephenson	Douglas Range, Alexander Island	Antarctica	69.82°S 69.72°W	2,987	2,987	0	None	None
95.	Annapurna	Himalayas	Nepal	28.6°N 83.82°E	2,984	8,091	5,107	Everest	Everest
96.	Pik Talgar	Trans-Ili Alatau	Kazakhstan	43.117839°N 77.341333°E	2,982	4,979	1,997	Everest	Jengish Chokusu
97.	Mount Shasta	Cascade Range	United States	41.409197°N 122.194889°W	2,977	4,317	1,340	Orizaba	Whitney
98.	Mount Wilhelm	Bismarck Range	Papua New Guinea	5.7799986°S 145.0295844°E	2,969	4,509	1,540	Puncak Jaya	Puncak Jaya
99.	Pico do Ramelau	Timor	Timor-Leste	8.9067°S 125.4933°E	2,963	2,963	0	None	None
100.	Mount Apo	Apo–Talomo, Mindanao	Philippines	6.9875°N 125.2708°E	2,954	2,954	0	None	None
101.	Gyala Peri	Nyenchen Tanglha Mountains	China	29.8131°N 94.9675°E	2,942	7,294	4,352	K2	Dhaulagiri
102.	Mount Leuser	Sumatra	Indonesia	3.7975°N 97.2192°E	2,941	3,466	525	Mount Kerinci	Mount Kerinci
103.	Mount Paget	Allardyce Range	South Georgia	54.4408°S 36.5553°W	2,934	2,934	0	None	None
104.	Chakragil	Kunlun Mountains	China	38.8658°N 75.1083°E	2,934	6,760	3,826	Everest	Gongga
105.	Emi Koussi	Tibesti Mountains	Chad	19.7894°N 18.5511°E	2,934	3,445	511	Kilimanjaro	Karisimbi
106.	Monarch Mountain	Coast Mountains	Canada	51.8994°N 125.8758°W	2,930	3,555	625	Denali	Waddington
107.	Mount Suckling	Owen Stanley Range	Papua New Guinea	9.6692°S 149.0108°E	2,925	3,676	751	Puncak Jaya	Puncak Jaya
108.	Mount Pulag	Cordillera Central, Luzon	Philippines	16.5836°N 120.8836°E	2,922	2,922	0	None	None
109.	El Melao	Sierras Pampeanas	Argentina	28.8675°S 67.1275°W	2,907	4,150	1,243	Aconcagua	Ojos del Salado
110.	Taftan	Baluchestan Mountains	Iran	28.6°N 61.13°E	2,901	3,941	1,040	Sabalan	Sabalan
111.	Shishapangma	Himalayas	China	28.3522°N 85.7797°E	2,897	8,027	5,130	Annapurna	Annapurna
112.	Pico da Neblina	Cerro de la Neblina	Brazil	0.805494°N 66.005358°W	2,886	2,994	108	Aconcagua	Ritacuba Blanco
113.	Saramati	Patkai	India; Myanmar	25.74°N 95.0375°E	2,885	3,826	941	Everest	Dhaulagiri
114.	Maromokotro	Madagascar	Madagascar	14.0228°S 48.9658°E	2,876	2,876	0	None	None
115.	Mount Shishaldin	Aleutian Range	United States	54.75°N 163.97°W	2,869	2,869	0	None	None
116.	Moncong Lompotabang	Sulawesi	Indonesia	5.34667907°S 119.93166653°E	2,857	2,874	17	Latimojong	Latimojong
117.	Buni Zom	Hindu Raj	Pakistan	36.1542°N 72.3275°E	2,845	6,542	3,697	Everest	K2
118.	Kuh-e Bandaka	Hindu Kush	Afghanistan	36.1792°N 70.9833°E	2,834	6,812	3,978	Tirich Mir	Tirich Mir
119.	Mount Robson	Canadian Rockies	Canada	53.1106°N 119.1567°W	2,829	3,959	1,130	Orizaba	Whitney
120.	Pico do Fogo	Fogo	Cape Verde	14.949269°N 24.340369°W	2,829	2,829	0	None	None
121.	Kamet	Himalayas	India	30.92°N 79.5933°E	2,825	7,756	4,931	Nanda Devi	Nanda Devi
122.	Jebel Shams	Al-Hajar Mountains	Oman	23.2373882°N 57.2637937°E	2,818	3,018	200	Everest	Jabal An-Nabi Shu'ayb
123.	Rakaposhi	Karakoram	Pakistan	36.1425°N 74.4892°E	2,818	7,788	4,970	K2	K2
124.	Aneto	Pyrenees	Spain	42.630992°N 0.656686°E	2,812	3,404	592	Mulhacén	Mulhacén
125.	Arjuno-Welirang	Java	Indonesia	7.765°S 112.5897°E	2,812	3,339	527	Semeru	Semeru
126.	Jiuding Shan	Daxue Mountains	China	31.5433°N 103.8533°E	2,808	4,969	2,161	Everest	K2

== Additional peaks ==
The list of peaks that follows is not complete, but the peaks are all notable. Island high points (whose prominence is equal to their elevation) can be found at the List of islands by highest point; hence most are not included below. Some well-known peaks listed here do not score highly by prominence.

All peaks with a prominence of more than 1,500 metres rank as an Ultra. For a complete listing of all 1,524 peaks with prominence greater than this level, see the lists of Ultras.

Peak	Location	Height (m)	Prominence (m)	Col (m)	Parent/ Notable for
Mount Ruapehu	New Zealand	2,797	2,797	0	none/ HP North Island, New Zealand
Mount Ciremai	Indonesia	3,078	2,792	286	Semeru/ HP West Java, Indonesia
Huascarán	Peru	6,746	2,776	3,970	Ojos del Salado/ HP Peru
Mount Arfak	Indonesia	2,955	2,775	179	?/ HP West Papua, Indonesia
Mount Elbert	United States	4,401	2,772	1,629	Mount Whitney/ HP Rocky Mountains, United States
San Gorgonio Mountain	United States	3,506	2,528	978	Olancha Peak/ HP Southern California, United States
Pidurutalagala	Sri Lanka	2,524	2,524	0	none/ HP Sri Lanka
Anamudi	India	2,695	2,479	216	?/ HP Western Ghats, India
Musala	Bulgaria	2,925	2,473	432	Großglockner^{1} / Mont Blanc^{2}/ HP Southeast Europe, Balkan Peninsula and Bulgaria
Mount Bazardüzü	Azerbaijan; Russia	4,466	2,454	2,012	?/ HP Azerbaijan
Qurnat as Sawda	Lebanon	3,093	2,393	700	?/ HP Lebanon
Galdhøpiggen	Norway	2,469	2,372	97	Sauyr Zhotasy^{1} / Everest^{2}/ HP Scandinavia and Norway
Gerlachovský štít	Slovakia	2,655	2,355	300	Mont Blanc/ HP Hight Tatras and Slovakia
Mount Olympos (Mytikas)	Greece	2,917	2,353	564	Großglockner^{1} / Mont Blanc^{2}/ HP Greece
Mount Pico (Azores)	Portugal	2,351	2,351	0	none/ HP Portugal, HP Mid-Atlantic Ridge
Mount Taranaki	New Zealand	2,518	2,308	210	Mount Ruapehu, North Island, New Zealand
Mount Kosciuszko	Australia	2,228	2,228	0	none/ HP mainland Australia
Monte Rosa	Italy Switzerland	4,634	2,165	2,469	Mont Blanc/ HP Switzerland
Mount Aragats	Armenia	4,090	2,143	1,947	?/ HP Armenia
Hvannadalshnúkur	Iceland	2,110	2,110	0	none/ HP Iceland
Triglav	Slovenia	2,864	2,052	812	Marmolada / Central element of the Slovene coat of arms
Moldoveanu	Romania	2,544	2,046	498	Făgăraș Mountains/ HP Romania
Barre des Écrins	France	4,102	2,045	2,057	Mont Blanc/ Only 4,000-metre mountain in France that lies outside the Mont Blanc Massif
Mount Washington	United States	1,917	1,874	43	Potato Knob^{1}/ Mount Mitchell^{2} / HP Northeastern United States and New Hampshire
Hermon	Lebanon; Syria	2,814	1,804	1,010	Qurnat as Sawda'/ HP Lebanon
Vihren	Bulgaria	2,914	1,784	1,131	Musala/ HP Pirin Mountain
Zugspitze	Austria Germany	2,962	1,746	1,216	Piz Bernina^{1} / Mont Blanc^{2}/ HP Germany
Radomir/Kalabak/Kerkini	Bulgaria / Greece	2,031	1,595	436	?/ HP Belasitsa Mountain
Botev Peak	Bulgaria	2,376	1,567	809	Musala/ HP Balkan Mountains
Roman-Kosh	Ukraine	1,545	1,541	4	?/ HP Crimean Mountains
Midžor	Bulgaria/Serbia	2,169	1,479	690	Musala/ HP Serbia and Western Balkan Mountains
Morne Diablotins	Dominica	1,447	1,447	0	none/ HP Dominica
Ruen	Bulgaria / North Macedonia	2,251	1,416	835	Cherni Vrah/ Musala/ HP Osogovo Mountain
Ben Nevis	United Kingdom	1,344	1,344	0	none/ HP Scotland and United Kingdom
Kailash	China	6,638	1,319	5,319	Lunpo Gangri / Sacred in four religions: Bon, Buddhism, Hinduism and Jainism
Botte Donato	Italy	1,928	1,307	621	?/ Sila National Park
Cherni Vrah	Bulgaria	2,290	1,259	1,031	Musala/ HP in Sofia City Province, right next to the capital of Bulgaria
Sandia Peak	United States	3,255	1,249	2,146	Sandia–Manzano_Mountains
Machhapuchhare	Nepal	6,993	1,233	5,760	Annapurna I/ Tremendous vertical relief and sacred place for the Gurungs
Carrauntoohil	Ireland	1,038	1,038	0	none/ HP Ireland
Snowdon	United Kingdom	1,085	1,038	47	Ben Nevis
Ama Dablam	Nepal	6,812	1,041	5,771	?/ Tremendous height
Matterhorn/Monte Cervino	Italy Switzerland	4,478	1,031	3,447	Weisshorn (4,507 m) / Its first ascent popularised mountain climbing culture
Eiger	Switzerland	3,967	362	3,605	Mönch (4,099 m) / Famed for its dangerous North face climb

In the table, the prominence parent is marked "^{1}", and the encirclement parent "^{2}". Where a single parent is listed, the different definitions agree.

== See also ==
- Lists of Ultras
- List of mountain lists
- List of islands by highest point
- Summit
- Topographic elevation
- Topographic isolation
- Topographic prominence
- Ultra-prominent summit

== Notes ==
*.By convention, cols created by human activity are not counted. Therefore, the Suez, Panama and other canals are ignored in these calculations. Cuts that lower the natural elevations of mountain passes are also ignored. Towers, monuments and similar on the peaks are also ignored.
