= Bogda Peak =

Mountain in Xinjiang, China

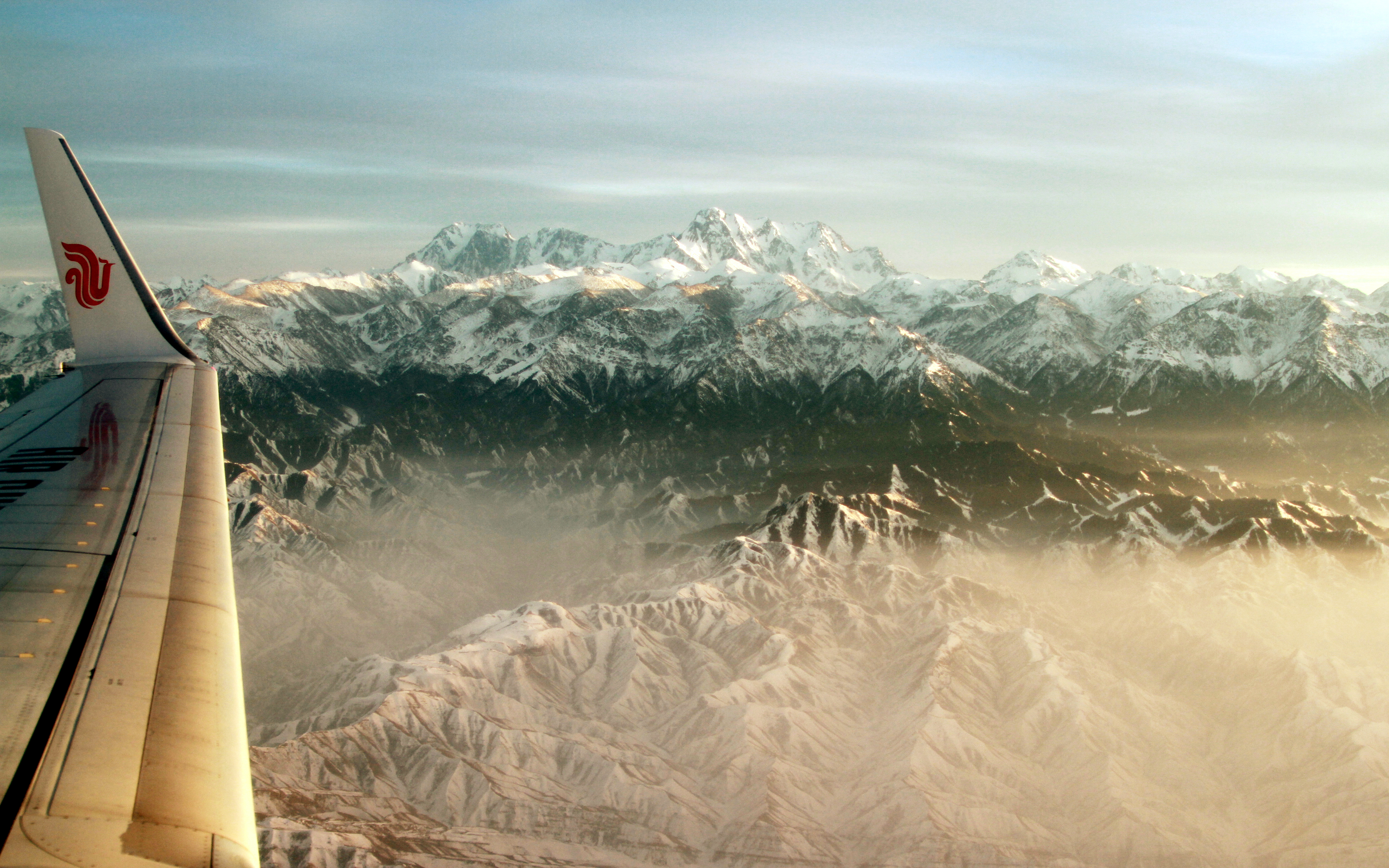
- Bogda Peak from the north by plane

Highest point
- Elevation: 5,445 m (17,864 ft)
- Prominence: 4,122 m (13,524 ft); Ranked 17th
- Listing: Ultra
- Coordinates: 43°48′06″N 88°19′57″E

Geography
- Location within Dzungaria
- Location: Dabancheng District/Fukang City border, Xinjiang, China
- Parent range: Bogda Shan, Tien Shan

Climbing
- First ascent: 1981 (Japanese team)

Bogda Peak or Bogda Feng (simplified Chinese: 博格达峰; traditional Chinese: 博格達峰; pinyin: Bógédá fēng, sometimes referred to as Mount Bogda) is the highest mountain in the Bogda Shan range, in the eastern Tian Shan mountains, China, at 5,445 m (17,864 ft). It is the northernmost summit of at least 5,000 m (16,400 ft) in Eurasia. Bogda Peak is the 17th most prominent peak on Earth.

Bogda Peak is a challenging climb due to its steep relief. Its sides slope at angles of between 70° and 80°. It was first climbed in 1981 by an 11-person team from Kyoto.

== See also ==
- List of ultras of Central Asia
