= Karka =

Mountain in Pakistan

Karka کارکا
- Location within Pakistan

Highest point
- Elevation: 6,222 m (20,413 ft)
- Coordinates: 36°43′45″N 73°53′25″E

Geography
- Location: Northern Pakistan
- Parent range: Hindu Raj

Karka (Urdu: کارکا) is a summit in the Hindu Raj range in Northern Pakistan and has a peak elevation of 6,222 m (20,413 ft).

Multiple Italian expeditions have been exploring the area from a geographic and ethnographic point of view. A group of climbers from Vicenza successfully climbed Karka for the first time in August 2007 during the expedition "La Gata - Karka 2007". In the course of the same expedition 4 other first ascents were performed in the Chiantar Glacier basin, while the trekking group set the route of what local guides already name "Trekking of the Italians".
