= Guzun =

Guzun گوزون
- Village
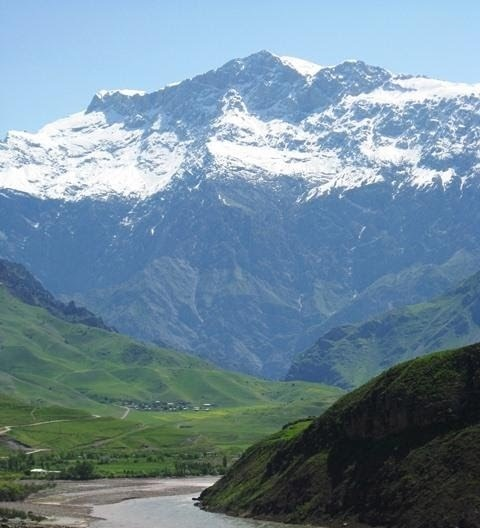
- Guzun is located at the foot of the mountain. Kuh-e Kallat (Kallat Peak)

- Location in Khwahan, Afghanistan
- Coordinates: 37°55′36″N 70°17′36″E
- Country: Afghanistan
- Province: Badakhshan
- District: Khwahan
- Time zone: UTC+04:30 (AST)

Guzun (Persian: گوزون) is a village in Khwahan district, Badakhshan province, northeastern Afghanistan.
