= Gul Lasht Zom =

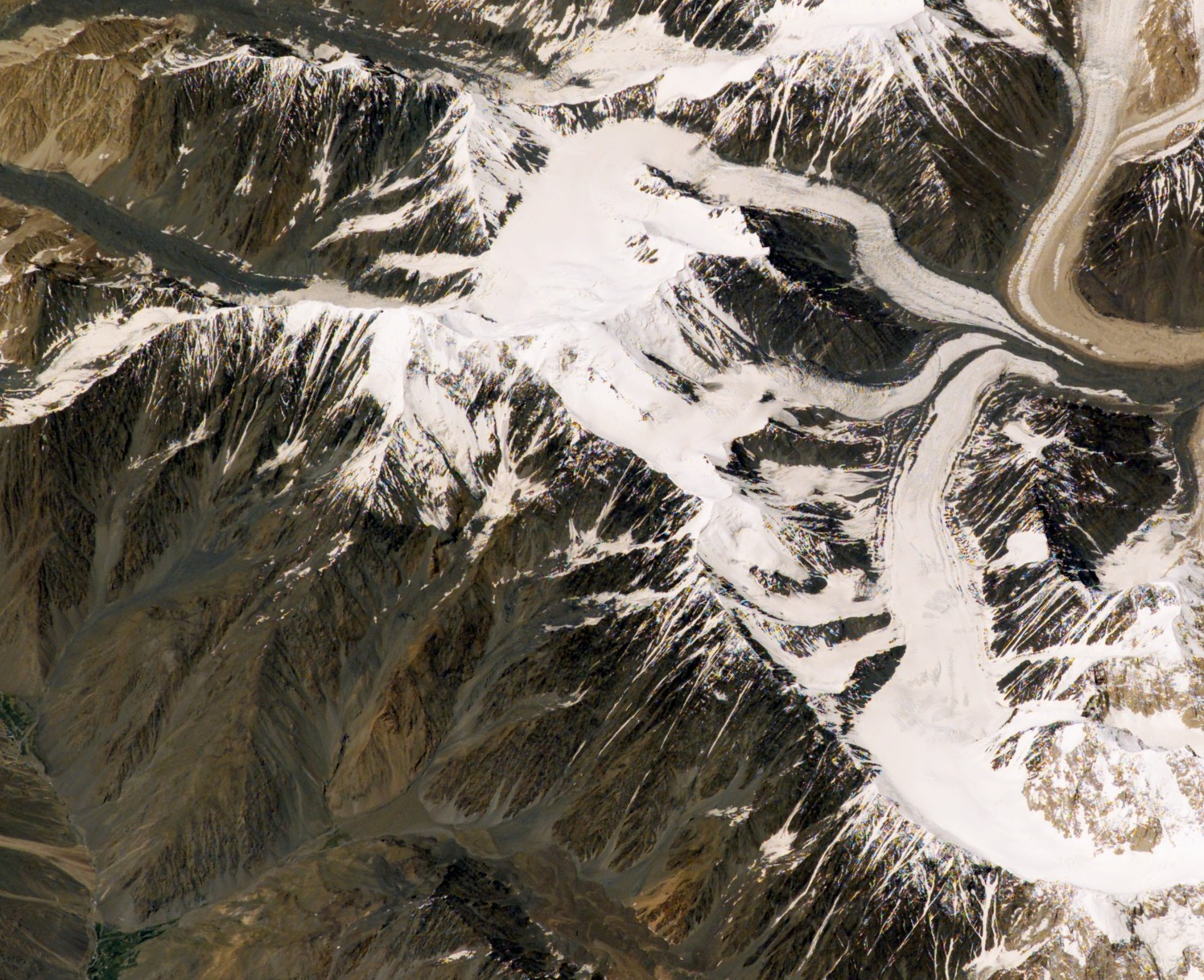

Highest point
- Elevation: 6,657 m (21,841 ft)
- Prominence: 511 m (1,677 ft)

Geography
- Location: Pakistan
- Parent range: Hindu Raj, Lotkoh

Climbing
- First ascent: 1969 by Kurt Diemberger of Austria

Gul Lasht Zom is a snowy pinnacle easily visible from any vantage point on the Tirich Glacier from the Shagroom side. It lies in the Hindu Raj range of Pakistan. It offers easy climbing and was first climbed by Kurt Diemberger of Austria in 1969.

== See also ==
- Hindu Raj
- Hindu Kush
- List of mountains in Pakistan
