= Kuh-e Kallat (Khwahan) =

Mountain in Afghanistan

Kallat Peak
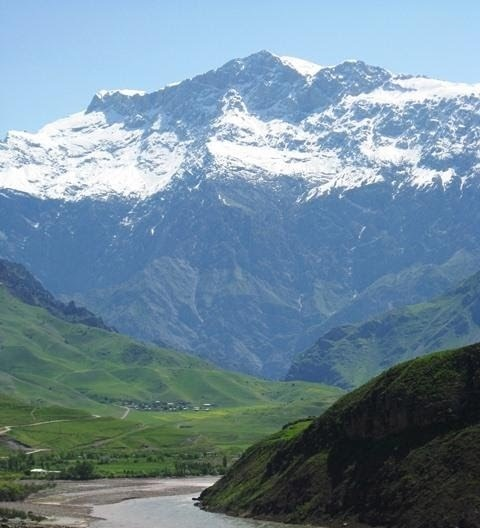
- Kalat peak of the highest mountains peak in Khwahan district

Highest point
- Elevation: 4,109 m (13,481 ft)
- Coordinates: 37°56′30″N 70°19′30″E

Geography
- Location within Afghanistan
- Location: Khwahan District, Badakhshan Province, Afghanistan
- Parent range: Pamir Mountains, Badakhshan Mountains, Khwahan Mountains,

Kuh-e Kallat (Persian: کوه کلات), also known as Kallat Peak, is a mountain near Gūzūn village in the Khwahan District of Badakhshan, in northeastern Afghanistan. It is among the highest peaks in the district.

== Geology ==
Kuh-e Kallat lies in Badakhshan Province in northeastern Afghanistan, a geologically complex region. The rocks of the Badakhshan area range in age from the Proterozoic to the Cenozoic and include Proterozoic schist and gneiss, Carboniferous and Triassic plutonic rocks, and Mesozoic and younger sedimentary rocks. The quadrangle containing the peak has been mapped by the United States Geological Survey and the Afghanistan Geological Survey using imaging-spectrometer data.

== See also ==
- List of mountains in Afghanistan
