= Koyo Zom =

Highest mountain in the Hindu Raj range, Pakistan

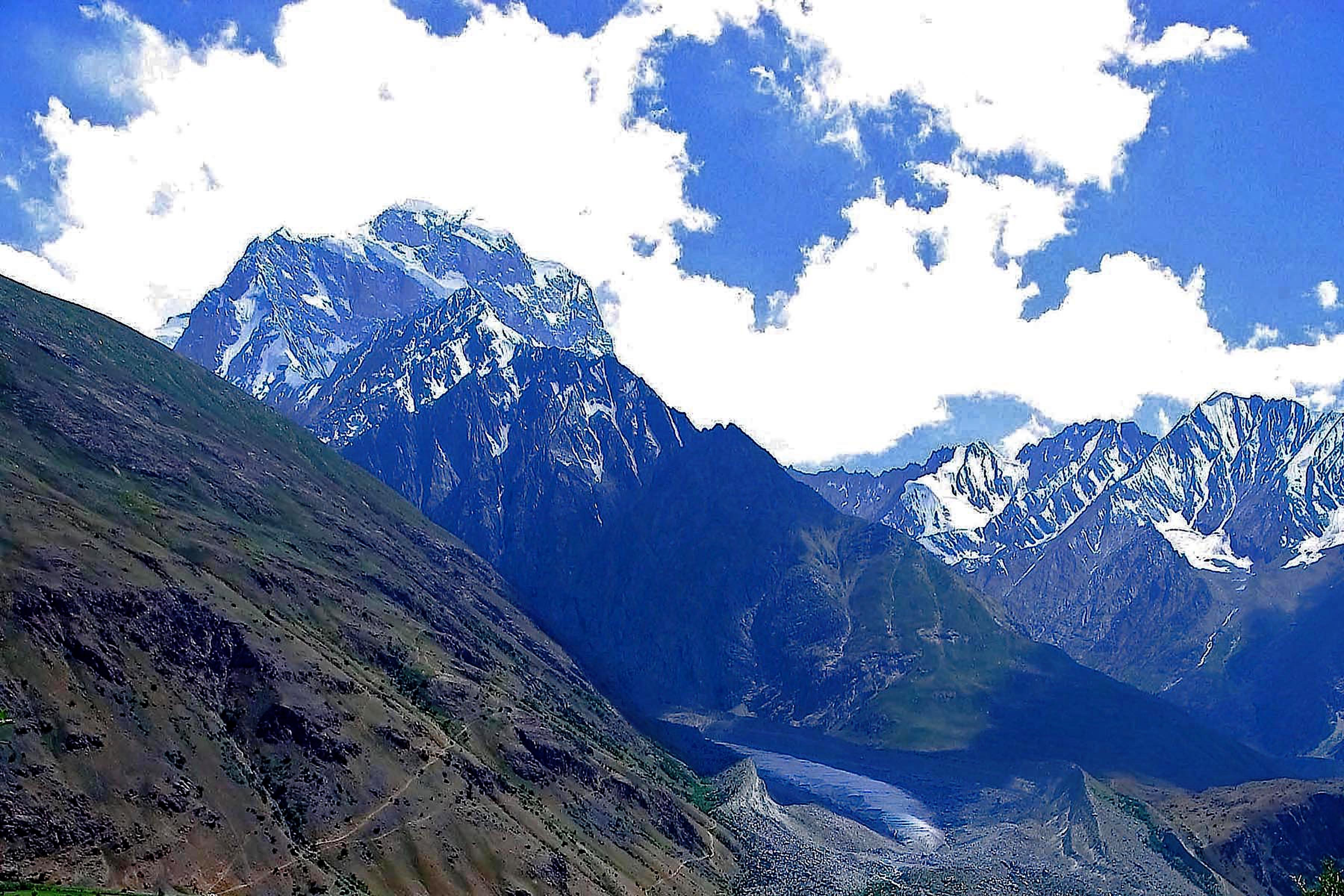

Highest point
- Elevation: 6,872 m (22,546 ft)
- Prominence: 2,562 m (8,406 ft)
- Listing: Ultra
- Coordinates: 36°43′21″N 73°14′17″E

Naming
- Native name: کویو زوم (Urdu)

Geography
- Location within Pakistan
- Location: Khyber Pakhtunkhwa/ Gilgit-Baltistan
- Parent range: Hindu Raj

Climbing
- First ascent: 1968 by an Austrian expedition

Koyo Zom (Urdu: کویو زوم) is the highest peak in Pakistan's Hindu Raj mountain range at 6,872 metres (22,546 ft). The Hindu Raj mountain range sits between the Hindu Kush in the west and the Karakoram in the east.

Koyo Zom is located on the boundary of the Upper Chitral District of Khyber Pakhtunkhwa and Gilgit-Baltistan in Pakistan. It was first climbed by an Austrian expedition in 1968.

== See also ==
- Hindu Raj
- Hindu Kush
- List of ultras of the Karakoram and Hindu Kush
