= El Mela =

Mountain in Argentina

- Location within Argentina

Highest point
- Elevation: 4,160 m (13,650 ft)
- Prominence: 2,917 m (9,570 ft); Ranked 108th
- Listing: Ultra
- Coordinates: 28°52′02″S 67°07′37″W

Geography
- Location: La Rioja, Argentina
- Parent range: Sierras Pampeanas

Cerro El Mela is the highest peak of the Sierra de Velasco in the Sierras Pampeanas range. It is located in the La Rioja Province of Argentina, about 70 km north-west of the provincial capital, La Rioja.

El Mela has an elevation of 4,160 metres (13,648 ft) above sea level. Despite its relatively low altitude, with 2,917 metres (9,570 ft) it is one of Argentina's most prominent peaks.

A short distance to the south, there is a subsidiary peak named El Melao, which was at times thought to be higher than El Mela. Some sources mention an altitude of 4,189 metres (13,743 ft) for this peak, but it was measured in November 2024 and its height was found to be 4152 metres.

== See also ==
- List of Ultras of South America
- List of peaks by prominence
