= Udren Zom =

Mountain in Pakistan

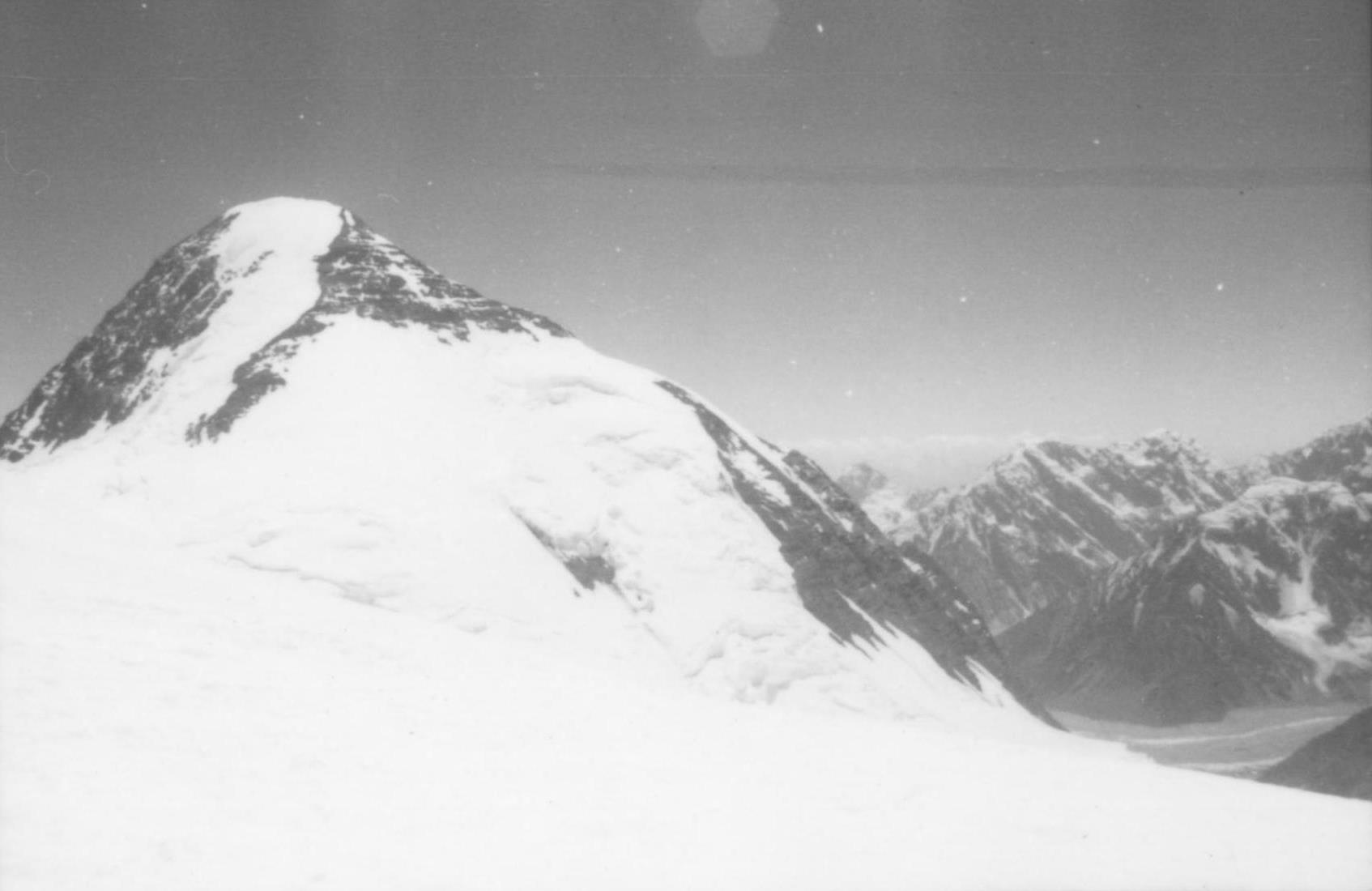
- Udren Zom from the Kohe Shakhawr ridge in 1977

Highest point
- Elevation: 7,140 m (23,430 ft)
- Prominence: 1,620 m (5,310 ft)
- Listing: Mountains of Pakistan; Ultra
- Coordinates: 36°32′10″N 71°59′13″E

Geography
- Location within Pakistan
- Country: Pakistan
- Province: Khyber Pakhtunkhwa
- Parent range: Hindu Kush

Climbing
- First ascent: 19 August 1964

Udren Zom is a mountain in the Hindu Kush mountain range in the Khyber Pakhtunkhwa province of Pakistan. Its summit has an elevation of 7,140 metres (23,425 ft) and a topographic prominence of 1,620 metres (5,315 ft). It is one of the highest peaks in the world located outside of the Himalayan and Karakoram ranges.

The main peak was first climbed in 1964 by an Austrian team. Gerald Gruber and Rudolf Pischinger completed the first ascent on August 19. Horst Schindelbacher made the second ascent, solo on August 22.

== See also ==
- List of ultras of the Karakoram and Hindu Kush
