= Lunkho e Dosare =

Mountain on the international boundary between Afghanistan and Pakistan

- Location within Afghanistan Location within Pakistan

Highest point
- Elevation: 6,901 m (22,641 ft)
- Prominence: 1,671 m (5,482 ft)
- Listing: Mountains of Afghanistan; Mountains of Pakistan; Ultra
- Coordinates: 36°46′33″N 72°26′24″E

Geography
- Location: Afghanistan–Pakistan border
- Parent range: Hindu Kush

Climbing
- First ascent: 5 August 1968

Lunkho e Dosare is a mountain in the Hindu Kush mountains. The mountain, with an elevation of 6,901 metres (22,641 ft), is located on the international border of Pakistan and Afghanistan.

== See also ==
- List of mountains by elevation
- List of ultras of the Karakoram and Hindu Kush
