= Kukurtlu Dome =

Sub-peak of Elbrus

- Kyukyurtlyu-Kol-Bashi
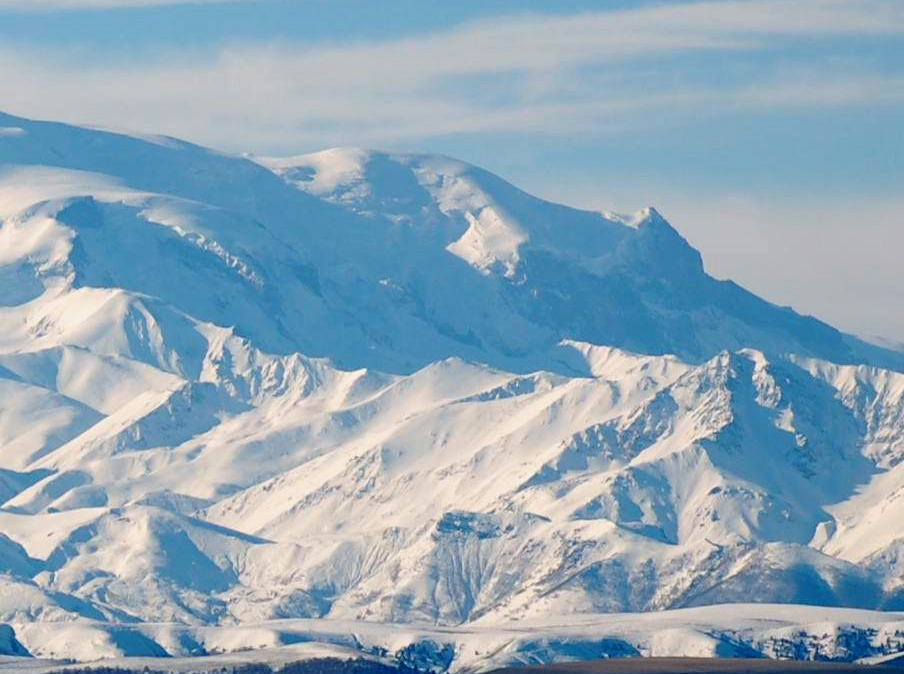

Highest point
- Elevation: 4,624 m (15,171 ft)
- Prominence: 18 m (59 ft)
- Isolation: 1.15 km (0.71 mi)
- Coordinates: 43°20′30″N 42°24′19″E

Geography
- Location within Russia
- Location: Russia
- Republic: Karachay-Cherkessia
- Parent range: Caucasus Mountains

Climbing
- First ascent: 1988

Kukurtlu Dome (also known as Kukurtli-Kolbashi (Russian: Кукуртли-Колбаши) and Kyukyurtlyu-Kol-Bashi) is a mountain peak in Caucasus Mountains. It is 4,624 metres (15,171 ft) above sea level. Since it only has a prominence height of 18 metres (59 ft), it is considered a sub-peak of Elbrus.

It is 0.75 miles southwest of Mount Elbrus. The name of the peak, translated from the Karachay language, means "Sulfur Mountain".

== See also ==
- Mount Blanc
