= Mizri Ghar =

Mountain in Pakistan

- Location within Pakistan

Highest point
- Elevation: 3,111 m (10,207 ft)
- Prominence: 1,618 m (5,308 ft)
- Listing: Ultra
- Coordinates: 31°20′27″N 70°01′45″E

Geography
- Location: Pakistan
- Parent range: Sulaiman

Mizri Ghar at 3,111 metres (10,207 ft) is the third highest mountain in the Sulaiman Mountains of Western Pakistan. The only peaks higher are Qaisaghar (Kaisargarh) at 3,444 metres (11,299 ft) and Takht-i-Sulaiman at 3,378 metres (11,083 ft). It is an ultra with prominence of 1618 metres and overall altitude of 3111 metres. It is located in Sub-Tehsil Zimri Palaseen of District Musakhail, Balochistan. In summer, Mizri Ghar receives a high amount of rainfall while in winter season it receives a considerable amount of snowfall, sometimes 4 to 5 ft. Snow capped mountain can easily be seen in winters from Indus Highway near Vehowa almost 40 miles away from mountain. Climate is very cool even in summer and its temperature is comparable to Naran, Kaghan, and Murree. This climate uniqueness of Mizri Ghar makes it one of the coldest tourist points in Balochistan and makes it attractive for the tourists of the adjoining areas such as Zhob, Loralai, D I Khan, DG Khan, and even Multan. There have been demands of paved road from Vehowa Tehsil of Taunsa district to base of Mizri Ghar, if constructed will not only improve the standards of living in Zimri Paloseen sub-tehsil but will also attract thousands of tourists from South Punjab. The main group located in the vicinity of this peak are the Zmarai Pashtun.

== Greenery and Wildlife ==
Mizri Ghar and the surrounding peaks, are predominantly covered with vegetation. The vegetation includes chilgoza pine (Pinus gerardiana), wild olive, and other shrubs and grasses. It has green lush valleys on its top. The top area is about 30 km long and 2 to 3 km wide. Harvesting Chilghoza pine nuts is a source of livelihood for locals in Zimri Palaseen. Destructive harvesting techniques, high demand, and poor forest management now threaten the sustainability of the forest and its products.

A few decades ago, Mizri Ghar was full of wildlife such as Suleman Markhor, Common leopard, fox, wolf, Asiatic steppe wild cat, and Hyaena. There were herds of Suleman Markhor in these mountains but due to poaching, these animals are depleting very quickly nowadays.

The local social activists have repeatedly requested the Government and international organizations working for wildlife to help in saving these animals from extinction. They have also requested to declare the top of the Mizri Ghar as "Wild Sanctuary or National Park for Wildlife". This will help in providing a safe environment for these animals which will result in growing the number of these wildlife. When the number of these Markhor is increased, then Trophy Hunting may be started like in Gilgit Baltistan. This will attract local and international tourism and will boost the local economy.

== See also ==
- List of ultras of the Karakoram and Hindu Kush
