= Topographic isolation =

Minimum horizontal distance to a point of equal elevation

Topographic isolation and prominence A - Nearest higher neighbour

The topographic isolation of a summit is the minimum horizontal distance to a point of equal elevation, representing a radius of dominance in which the peak is the highest point. It can be calculated for small hills and islands, major mountain peaks, and even submarine summits. Mount Everest, the highest point on Earth, has an undefined isolation, since there is no higher point to reference.

Because topographic isolation can be difficult to determine, a common approximation is the distance to a peak called the nearest higher neighbour (NHN).

== Isolation table ==
The following sortable table lists Earth's 40 most topographically isolated summits.

The 40 most topographically isolated summits on Earth
Rank	Summit	Landmass	Country	Elevation	Prominence	Isolation	Nearest higher neighbour
1	Mount Everest	Eurasia	Nepal; China	8848 m 29,029 ft	8848 m 29,029 ft	n/a	n/a
2	Aconcagua	South America	Argentina (Mendoza)	6962 m 22,841 ft	6962 m 22,841 ft	16,520 km 10,265 mi	Tirich Mir (Khyber Pakhtunkhwa, Pakistan)
3	Denali	North America	United States (Alaska)	6194 m 20,320 ft	6149 m 20,174 ft	7,450 km 4,629 mi	Yanamax (Xinjiang, China)
4	Kilimanjaro	Africa	Tanzania	5895 m 19,341 ft	5885 m 19,308 ft	5,510 km 3,424 mi	Kuh-e Shashgal (Afghanistan)
5	Puncak Jaya	New Guinea	Indonesia (Central Papua)	4884 m 16,024 ft	4884 m 16,024 ft	5,262 km 3,269 mi	Jade Dragon Snow Mountain (Yunnan, China)
6	Vinson Massif	Antarctica	Antarctica	4892 m 16,050 ft	4892 m 16,050 ft	4,861 km 3,020 mi	Risco Plateado (Mendoza, Argentina)
7	Mont Orohena	Tahiti	French Polynesia	2241 m 7,352 ft	2241 m 7,352 ft	4,128 km 2,565 mi	Mount Ngauruhoe (New Zealand)
8	Mauna Kea	Hawai'i	United States (Hawai'i)	4205 m 13,796 ft	4205 m 13,796 ft	3,947 km 2,453 mi	Mount Shasta (California, US)
9	Gunnbjørn Fjeld	Greenland	Greenland	3694 m 12,119 ft	3694 m 12,119 ft	3,254 km 2,022 mi	The Eiger (Canton of Bern, Switzerland)
10	Aoraki / Mount Cook	South Island	New Zealand	3754 m 12,316 ft	3754 m 12,316 ft	3,140 km 1,951 mi	Mount Adam (Victoria Land, Antarctica)
11	Thabana Ntlenyana	Africa	Lesotho	3482 m 11,424 ft	2390 m 7,841 ft	3,003 km 1,866 mi	Mount Meru (Tanzania)
12	Maunga Terevaka	Easter Island	Chile	506 m 1,660 ft	506 m 1,660 ft	2,836 km 1,762 mi	Cerro de Los Inocentes (Alejandro Selkirk Island, Chile)
13	Mont Blanc	Eurasia	France; Italy	4809 m 15,778 ft	4696 m 15,407 ft	2,813 km 1,748 mi	Kukurtlu Dome (Karachay-Cherkessia, Russia)
14	Piton des Neiges	Réunion	France	3071 m 10,075 ft	3071 m 10,075 ft	2,767 km 1,720 mi	Giant's Castle (KwaZulu-Natal, South Africa)
15	Klyuchevskaya Sopka	Eurasia	Russia (Kamchatka)	4750 m 15,584 ft	4649 m 15,253 ft	2,748 km 1,708 mi	Mount Foraker (Alaska, US)
16	Pico de Orizaba	North America	Mexico (Puebla)	5636 m 18,491 ft	4922 m 16,148 ft	2,690 km 1,672 mi	Pico Cristóbal Colón (Magdalena Department, Colombia)
17	Queen Mary's Peak	Tristan da Cunha	Saint Helena, Ascension and Tristan da Cunha	2060 m 6,759 ft	2060 m 6,759 ft	2,665 km 1,656 mi	Mount Paget (South Georgia Island, British Overseas Territories)
18	Mount Whitney	North America	United States (California)	4421 m 14,505 ft	3072 m 10,080 ft	2,649 km 1,646 mi	Nevado de Toluca (State of Mexico, Mexico)
19	Gunung Kinabalu	Borneo	Malaysia (Sabah)	4095 m 13,435 ft	4095 m 13,435 ft	2,538 km 1,577 mi	Ngga Pilimsit (Papua, Indonesia)
20	Mount Elbrus	Eurasia	Russia (Kabardino-Balkaria)	5642 m 18,510 ft	4741 m 15,554 ft	2,473 km 1,536 mi	Pik Agasis (Tajikistan)
21	Pico da Bandeira	South America	Brazil (Espírito Santo)	2897 m 9,505 ft	2647 m 8,684 ft	2,393 km 1,487 mi	Cerro Naranjos (Bolivia)
22	Mont Cameroun	Africa	Cameroon	4040 m 13,255 ft	3901 m 12,799 ft	2,338 km 1,453 mi	Mikeno (Democratic Republic of the Congo)
23	Mount Paget	South Georgia	South Georgia and the South Sandwich Islands	2915 m 9,564 ft	2915 m 9,564 ft	2,269 km 1,410 mi	Welch Mountains (Palmer Land, Antarctica)
24	Mauga Silisili	Savai'i	Samoa	1858 m 6,096 ft	1858 m 6,096 ft	2,245 km 1,395 mi	Tabwemasana (Vanuatu)
25	Nevado Huascarán	South America	Peru	6746 m 22,133 ft	2776 m 9,108 ft	2,196 km 1,365 mi	Tres Cruces (Chile/Argentina border)
26	Anamudi	Eurasia	India (Kerala)	2695 m 8,842 ft	2480 m 8,136 ft	2,115 km 1,314 mi	Machapuchare (Nepal)
27	Jebel Toubkal	Africa	Morocco	4167 m 13,671 ft	3755 m 12,320 ft	2,078 km 1,291 mi	Picco Luigi Amedeo (Italy)
28	Mount Fuji	Honshu	Japan (Chūbu)	3776 m 12,388 ft	3776 m 12,388 ft	2,077 km 1,291 mi	Xueshan (Taiwan)
29	Emi Koussi	Africa	Chad	3445 m 11,302 ft	2934 m 9,626 ft	2,001 km 1,243 mi	Mount Cameroon (Cameroon)
30	Mawson Peak	Heard Island	Australia (Heard and McDonald Islands)	2745 m 9,006 ft	2745 m 9,006 ft	1,922 km 1,194 mi	Mount McMaster (Enderby Land, Antarctica)
31	Mount Mitchell	North America	United States (North Carolina)	2037 m 6,684 ft	1857 m 6,091 ft	1,913 km 1,189 mi	Lone Butte (Colorado, US)
32	Gunung Kerinci	Sumatra	Indonesia (West Sumatra)	3805 m 12,484 ft	3805 m 12,484 ft	1,905 km 1,184 mi	Gunung Kinabalu (Sabah, Malaysia)
33	Joe's Hill	Kiritimati	Kiribati	13 m 43 ft	13 m 43 ft	1,903 km 1,182 mi	Puu Ki (Hawaii, US)
34	Agrihan High Point	Agrihan	Northern Mariana Islands	965 m 3,166 ft	965 m 3,166 ft	1,902 km 1,182 mi	Mount Amagi (Chūbu, Japan)
35	Mount Kosciuszko	Australia	Australia (New South Wales)	2228 m 7,310 ft	2228 m 7,310 ft	1,895 km 1,177 mi	Tutoko (New Zealand)
36	Olavtoppen	Bouvet Island	Bouvet Island	780 m 2,559 ft	780 m 2,559 ft	1,856 km 1,153 mi	Edinburgh Peak (Gough Island, South Atlantic Ocean)
37	Mascarin Peak	Marion Island	South Africa (Prince Edward Islands)	1230 m 4,035 ft	1230 m 4,035 ft	1,848 km 1,148 mi	Cockscomb (Eastern Cape, South Africa)
38	Green Mountain	Ascension Island	Saint Helena, Ascension and Tristan da Cunha	859 m 2,818 ft	859 m 2,818 ft	1,842 km 1,145 mi	Mount Richard-Molard (Ivory Coast/Guinea border)
39	Gora Narodnaya	Eurasia	Russia (Khanty-Mansi)	1895 m 6,217 ft	1772 m 5,814 ft	1,836 km 1,141 mi	Kattotjåkkå (Sweden)
40	Yushan	Taiwan	Taiwan	3952 m 12,966 ft	3952 m 12,966 ft	1,815 km 1,128 mi	Peak 4030 (Yunnan, China)

== Examples ==
- The nearest peak to Germany's highest mountain, the 2,962-metre (9,718 ft) high Zugspitze, that has a 2,962-metre (9,718 ft) contour is the 2,988-metre (9,803 ft) Zwölferkogel in Austria's Stubai Alps. The distance between the Zugspitze and this contour is 25.8 kilometres (16 mi); the Zugspitze is thus the highest peak for a radius of 25.8 kilometres (16 mi). Its isolation is thus 25.8 kilometres (16 mi).
- Because there are no higher mountains than Mount Everest, it has no definitive isolation. Many sources list its isolation as the circumference of the Earth over the poles or – questionably, because there is no agreed definition – as half the Earth's circumference.
- After Mount Everest, Aconcagua, the highest mountain of the Americas, has the greatest isolation of all mountains. There is no higher land for 16,534 kilometres (10,274 mi). Its height is first exceeded by Tirich Mir in the Hindu Kush.
- Mont Blanc is the highest mountain of the Alps. The geographically nearest higher mountains are all in the Caucasus. Kukurtlu Dome, 4,978 metres (16,332 ft), is the reference peak for Mont Blanc.
- Musala is the highest peak in Rila mountain, also in Bulgaria and the Balkan Peninsula mountain system; standing at 2,925 m (9,596 ft) it is the fourth-most topographically isolated major peak in Continental Europe. With a topographic prominence of 2,473 metres (8,114 ft), Musala is also the sixth-highest peak by topographic prominence in mainland Europe.

== See also ==
- Most isolated major summits of Europe
- Table of the most isolated major summits of North America
  - Table of the most isolated major summits of the United States
  - Most isolated mountain peaks of Canada
  - Most isolated mountain peaks of Mexico
- Geodesy
- Physical geography
- Summit (topography)
- Topographic elevation
- Topographic prominence
- Topography
