= Kezhen Peak =

Mountain in Xinjiang, China

- Karpogo Sar
- Location within China

Highest point
- Elevation: 7,038 m (23,091 ft)
- Prominence: 1,578 m (5,177 ft)
- Listing: Ultra
- Coordinates: 35°55′30″N 76°10′30″E

Geography
- Location: Xinjiang, China
- Parent range: Karakoram

Kezhen Peak, also known as Karpogo Sar, is a mountain in the Karakoram mountain range. It is located in the Xinjiang Autonomous Region of China.

Kezhen Peak has an elevation of 7,038 metres (23,091 ft) and a topographic prominence of 1,578 metres (5,177 ft), and is therefore an Ultra prominent peak.

== See also ==
- List of mountains in China
- List of ultras of the Karakoram and Hindu Kush
