= Buni Zom =

Mountain in Hindu Raj range, Pakistan

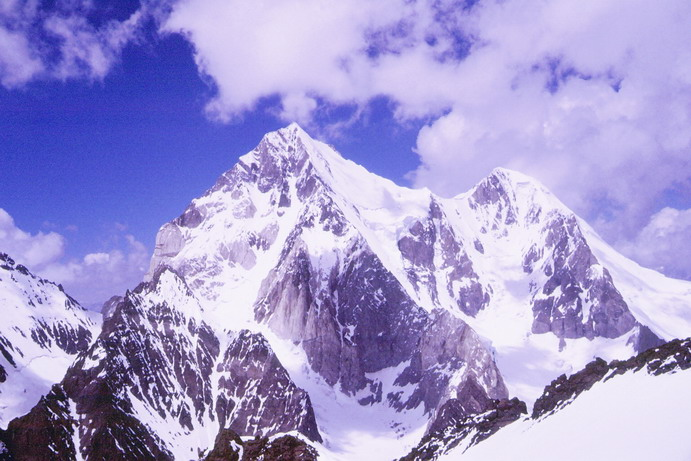
- Buni Zom Main and North from the west face of Gordoghan Zom, 2002

Highest point
- Elevation: 6,542 m (21,463 ft)
- Prominence: 2,845 m (9,334 ft); Ranked 117th
- Listing: Ultra
- Coordinates: 36°09′15″N 72°19′39″E

Geography
- Location within Khyber Pakhtunkhwa Location within Pakistan
- Location: Khyber Pakhtunkhwa, Pakistan
- Parent range: Hindu Raj

Climbing
- First ascent: 1957 by W.K.A. Berry, C.H. Tyndale-Biscoe

The Buni Zom group is a prominent mountain area of Chitral, in the Hindu Raj range of Pakistan. Buni Zom (main) is the highest peak of the group with an elevation of 6,542 m (21,463 ft). It is located about 50 km (30 mi) northeast of the town of Chitral, and about 50 km (30 mi) east of Tirich Mir (7,708 m), the highest peak in the Hindu Kush.

Map of Buni Zom

In 1957, the New Zealanders W.K.A. Berry and C.H. Tyndale-Biscoe accomplished the first ascent of the Main Peak of Buni Zom from the steep razorlike north ridge The second ascent was in 1975 by Japanese Masao Okabe, Hideo Sato and Shigeru Tabe and third ascent was in 1979 by Americans Joe Reinhard and Richard J. Isherwood both from south face.

The Buni Zom group has many other peaks, some of which have been climbed. There are 12 peaks over 6,000 m (19,700 ft) in the Buni Zom group which are unclimbed Himalayan Index.

== Peaks of the Buni Zom Group ==
Following is a list of the peaks over 6,000 meters in the Buni Zom group, from the Himalayan Index. The first ascent of the peak named Buni Zom SS or 6MT or P6110 was by Nikolas Kroupis and George Voutiropoulos on 31 July 2007. This climb is not yet recorded in the Himalayan Index, but the article is published in American Alpine Journal.

| No | Preferred Name | Name | Number | Ht. m. | Ht.ft. | Latitude | Longitude | Climbed? |
|---|---|---|---|---|---|---|---|---|
| 1 | Buni Zom | Buni Zom | 9701 | 6542 | 21463 | 36°09'00" | 72°19'12" | y |
| 2 | Awi Zom | Awi Zom | 9707 | 6484 | 21272 | 36°11'24" | 72°24'00" | y |
| 3 | Rahman Zom | Raman Zom | 9708 | 6350 | 20833 | 36°15'00" | 72°21'36" | y |
| 4 | Buni Zom N | Buni Zom N | 9702 | 6338 | 20793 | 36°10'12" | 72°19'12" | y |
| 5 | Ghochhar Sar | Gochohar Sar | 9717 | 6249 | 20501 | 35°54'00" | 72°17'24" | y |
| 6 | Gordoghan Zom | Gordoghan Zom | 9709 | 6240 | 20472 | 36°09'00" | 72°22'48" | y |
| 7 | Buni Zom S | Buni Zom S | 9705 | 6220 | 20406 | 36°09'00" | 72°19'12" | y |
| 8 | Shachio Kuh Zom | Shachio Kuh Zom | 9719 | 6215 | 20390 | 35°53'24" | 72°15'00" | y |
| 9 | P c6200 | P c6200 | 9718 | 6200 | 20340 | 35°54'36" | 72°16'48" | |
| 10 | Gordoghan Zom III | Gordoghan Zom III | | 6156 | 20192 | 36°09'00" | 72°22'00" | y |
| 11 | Ghochhar Sar S | Ghochhar Sar S | 9727 | 6150 | 20176 | 35°54'00" | 72°16'48" | |
| 12 | Buni Zom II | Buni Zom II | 9703 | 6147 | 20167 | 36°10'48" | 72°19'48" | y |
| 13 | Buni Zom SS | 6MT - P 6110 | 9711 | 6110 | 20045 | 36°07'12" | 72°19'12" | y |
| 14 | Rinzho Zom | Rinz Ho Zom M | 9714 | 6100 | 20012 | 36°01'12" | 72°18'00" | |
| 15 | Rinzho Zom E | Rinzho Zom E | 9715 | 6080 | 19947 | 36°01'12" | 72°18'36" | |
| 16 | Rinzho Zom W | Rinz Ho Zom W | 9713 | 6068 | 19907 | 36°01'12" | 72°16'48" | |
| 17 | Rinzho Zom MD | Rinzho Zom MD | 9728 | 6050 | 19848 | 36°00'36" | 72°17'24" | |
| 18 | Thalo Zom | Thalo Zom | 9721 | 6050 | 19848 | 35°47'24" | 72°16'48" | |
| 19 | Buni Zom III | Buni Zom III | 9704 | 6050 | 19848 | 36°10'12" | 72°20'24" | y |
| 20 | Gordoghan Zom II | Gordoghen Zom II | 9710 | 6048 | 19842 | 36°08'24" | 72°23'24" | |
| 21 | Tunyush Zom | Tonyush Zom | 9716 | 6023 | 19760 | 35°59'24" | 72°13'48" | |
| 22 | P 6020 | P 6020 | 9724 | 6020 | 19750 | 36°11'24" | 72°22'12" | y |
| 23 | Chakholi Zom | Chakholi Zom | 9712 | 6020 | 19750 | 36°06'36" | 72°15'36" | y |
| 24 | Phargam Zom I | P 6103 | 9726 | 6000 | 19684 | 36°11'24" | 72°21'36" | y |
| 25 | Phargam Zom II | P 6086 | 9725 | 6000 | 19684 | 36°10'48" | 72°21'36" | y |
| 26 | P 6010 | P 6010 | 9723 | 6000 | 19684 | 36°11'24" | 72°22'12" | y |
| 27 | Buni Zom IV | Buni Zom IV | 9722 | 6000 | 19684 | 36°12'00" | 72°21'36" | |
| 28 | P c6000 | P c6000 | 9706 | 6000 | 19684 | 36°12'00" | 72°21'36" | |
| 29 | Harambit Zom | P 6031 | 9720 | 5997 | 19674 | 35°48'36" | 72°16'48" | |

== See also ==
- Buni
- Hindu Raj
- List of mountains in Pakistan
- List of ultras of the Karakoram and Hindu Kush
