= Koh-e Hindukush =

Mountain in Afghanistan

- (Dari: کوه هندوکش)
- Location within Afghanistan

Highest point
- Elevation: 4,150 m (13,620 ft)
- Parent peak: Hindu Kush
- Coordinates: 35°24′2.1″N 69°9′32.4″E

Geography
- Location: Parwan Province
- Parent range: Hindu Kush

Koh-e Hindukush (Dari: کوه هندوکش "mountain which attracts the Hindu or Hindu-happy"). It is a mountain of the Hindu Kush in Afghanistan. It is located in Parwan Province.

Koh-e Hindukush lies northeast to southwest of Afghanistan and divides the Amu Darya valley into northern and southern parts.

The highest peak of Koh-e Hindukush is Mount Tirich Mir, (7,690 meters), located in the Chitral District of Khyber Pakhtunkhwa, Pakistan.
