= Kuh-e Shashgal =

Peak in Afghanistan

- Location within Afghanistan

Highest point
- Elevation: 6,290 m (20,640 ft)
- Prominence: 1,758 m (5,768 ft)
- Listing: Ultra
- Coordinates: 35°55′50″N 71°4′50″E

Geography
- Location: Afghanistan
- District: Kuran wa Munjan
- Parent range: Hindu Kush

Climbing
- First ascent: unclimbed
- Easiest route: rock/snow/ice climb

Kuh-e Shashgal (also known as Gory Shashgal or Mount Shashgal (Persian: کوه ششگل)) is a mountain peak in the Badakhshan Province in Afghanistan, near the eastern border of the country. It has a height of 6,290 m (20,640 ft) and a prominence height of 1,758 m (5,768 ft). It is also known for being the isolation parent of Kilimanjaro, the highest mountain in Africa.

As of February 2026, there has been no recorded ascents on this mountain.

== See also ==
- Kilimanjaro
