= Eastern Rift mountains =

African mountain range

Coordinates: 0.1°S 37.2°E

East African Lakes.

The East African mountains are a mountain region in the African Great Lakes, within Kenya, Uganda, Tanzania, Democratic Republic of the Congo, Rwanda and Burundi.

== Location and description ==
The mountains are related to the East African Rift, and are in two chains. The Western Rift includes the Virunga Mountains, Mitumba Mountains, and the Rwenzori Range, while the mountains to the east include the largest peaks in Africa: the snow-covered Mount Kilimanjaro (5,895m, 19,340 ft), and Mount Kenya (5,199m, 17,058 ft). Other mountains in the Eastern Rift area include Mount Elgon in Kenya and Uganda. All but the Rwenzori are of volcanic origin.

The weather at the highest elevations is often cold and wet.

== Fauna ==
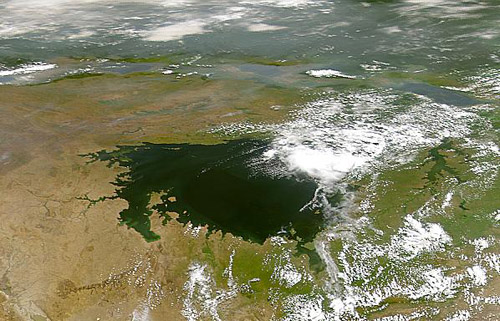
Lake Victoria is one of the great lakes of Africa.

The mountains are rich in wildlife, including animals who migrate to higher altitudes during the hot season in the surrounding savanna. The mountains are home to a number of endemic bird species, such as Hinde's babbler, which live only on Mount Kenya.

== Threats and preservation ==
Map of African Great Lakes

The lower elevations of the mountains have been extensively used for forestry and growing tea and coffee. Much of the original forest has been lost, including the cloud forest that once covered much of Kilimanjaro. Climbing these mountains is a major attraction, and Kilimanjaro National Park attracts hundreds of visitors each year, many of whom access the mountain from the coffee-growing town of Moshi.

== Exploration ==
The mountains were discovered by Europeans in order of distance from the coast, which also happens to be in decreasing order of height. They were also explored and climbed in this order.
