= Ghamubar Zom =

Mountain in Hindu Raj range, Pakistan

Ghamubar Zom گموبر دزوم
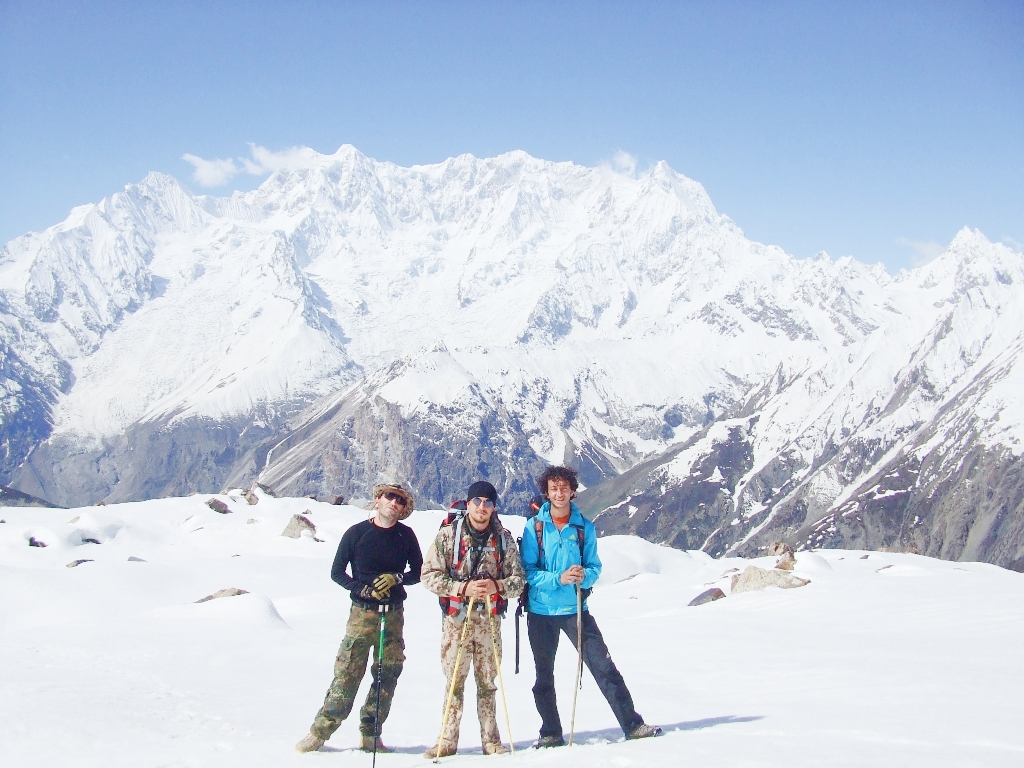
- Ghamubar Zom from Drakot Pass

Highest point
- Elevation: 6,518 m (21,385 ft)
- Prominence: 2,133 m (6,998 ft)
- Listing: Ultra
- Coordinates: 36°35′24″N 73°20′30″E

Geography
- Location within Gilgit Baltistan
- Location: Gilgit–Baltistan, Pakistan
- Parent range: Hindu Raj

Ghamubar Zom (Urdu: گموبر دزوم) is a mountain in the Hindu Raj mountain range in Gilgit–Baltistan, Pakistan. It has a summit elevation of 6,518 m above sea level. The mountain is close to the border of Gilgit–Baltistan and Khyber Pakhtunkhwa. The nearest village to the mountain is Darkot in Yasin valley.

The entire prominence of mountain is visible from Darkot and Rawat villages.

== See also ==
- Hindu Raj
- List of mountains in Pakistan
- List of ultras of the Western Himalayas
