= Pik Agasis =

Mountain peak in Tajikistan

- Agasis Prak
- Location within Tajikistan

Highest point
- Elevation: 5,877 m (19,281 ft)
- Prominence: 1,597 m (5,240 ft)
- Listing: Ultra
- Coordinates: 38°59′5″N 71°47′5″E

Geography
- Location: Tajikistan
- District: Lakhsh; Sangvor
- Parent range: Pamirs

Climbing
- First ascent: Unknown
- Easiest route: rock/snow/ice climb

Pik Agasis is a 5,877 metres (19,281 ft) mountain in Tajikistan. It is part of the Pamir mountain range. The mountain forms the highest elevation in the west of the Peter I chain. With a prominence height of over 1,500 metres (4,900 ft), it is an ultra-prominent peak. It is the isolation parent of Mount Elbrus, 2,000 kilometres (1,200 mi) to the west.

== See also ==
- Mount Elbrus
