= Kuh-e Chuk Shakh =

Mountain in Afghanistan

- Location within Afghanistan

Highest point
- Elevation: 5,467 m (17,936 ft)
- Prominence: 2,444 m (8,018 ft)
- Listing: Ultra
- Coordinates: 36°46′42″N 71°27′06″E

Naming
- Native name: کوه چوک شاخ (Pashto)

Geography
- Location: Afghanistan
- Province: Badakhshan
- Parent range: Hindu Kush

Kuh-e Chuk Shakh is a mountain of the Hindu Kush mountain range in Badakhshan province in northeastern Afghanistan.

== See also ==
- List of ultras of the Karakoram and Hindu Kush
