= Kuh-e Safed Khers =

Mountain in Badakhshan, Afghanistan

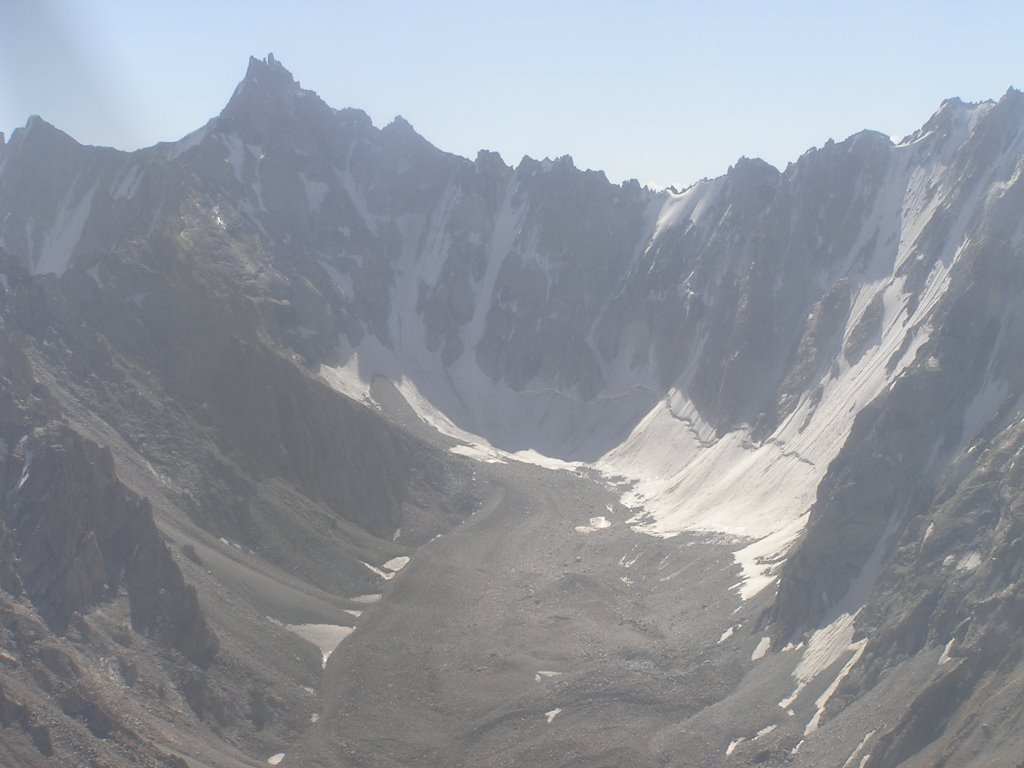
- Kuh-e Safed Khers

Highest point
- Elevation: 5,326 m (17,474 ft)
- Coordinates: 38°5′56″N 71°5′56″E

Geography
- Location within Afghanistan
- Location: Darwaz between Maimay and Nusay in Badakhshan Province

Kuh-e Safed Khers (Persian: کوه سفید خرس) is a mountain in Darwaz district of Badakhshan province, in northeastern Afghanistan. This peak is 5,326 metres (17,474 ft) high.

== Resources ==
- Wikipamp.<Kuh-e Safed Khers
- Wikipedia Persian.<kuh-e safed khers
