= Koh e Alburz =

Mountain in Afghanistan

- Dari: کوه البرز; Pashto: د البرز غرونه
- Location within Afghanistan

Highest point
- Elevation: 3,191 m (10,469 ft)
- Parent peak: Hindu Kush
- Coordinates: 32°40′43.1″N 66°30′43.1″E

Geography
- Location: Zabul Province
- Parent range: Hindu Kush

Koh e Alburz (Dari: کوه البرز) also called Da Alborz Ghrona (Pashto: د البرز غرونه) is a mountain of the Hindu Kush in Afghanistan. It is located near Dey Chopan District, Zabul Province. (32°39'54.14" N 66°29'50.39")

The mountain should not be confused with another mountain spur with the same name. Kōh-e Alburz is a mountain spur with a height of 3206 m. Not far from this mountain lies in the neighboring Ghazni province two mountains named Maidan e Rustam (Dari: میدان رستم) or Da Rustam Maidan (Pashto: د رستم میدان) which transliterates as the 'Place of Rustam'.
