= Kuh-e Bandaka =

Mountain in Afghanistan

- Location within Afghanistan

Highest point
- Elevation: 6,812 m (22,349 ft) (Note: Some sources, e.g. the Himalayan Index, give 6843 metres; the AAJ 1961 article gives 6,660 metres)
- Prominence: 2,834 m (9,298 ft); Ranked 118th
- Listing: Ultra
- Coordinates: 36°10′45″N 70°59′00″E

Naming
- Native name: کوه بندکا (Dari)

Geography
- Country: Afghanistan
- Province: Badakhshan
- Parent range: Hindu Kush

Climbing
- First ascent: 1960 by Wolfgang von Hansemann, Dietrich Hasse, Siegbert Heine, and Johannes Winkler
- Easiest route: Glacier/snow climb

Kuh-e Bandaka (Dari: کوه بندکا) or Kohe Bandaka, Koh-i Bandaka, Bandako, or incorrectly Koh-i-Bandakor) is one of the highest peaks of the Hindu Kush mountain range in Badakhshan in northeastern Afghanistan. It is northeast of Kabul and west of Chitral, in Pakistan. Separated by a relatively low pass from the core of the Hindu Kush, it is the second highest mountain entirely within Afghanistan, and the most topographically prominent peak in all of Afghanistan.

On September 22, 1960, the second German expedition to visit the Hindu Kush made the first ascent of Kuh-e Bandaka. The members of the expedition were Wolfgang von Hansemann, Dietrich Hasse, Siegbert Heine, and Johannes Winkler, all from West Berlin; all attained the summit. They made four camps, with their base camp in the Dare-Sachi Valley at an altitude of 4,100 m (13,500 ft). The expedition also made multiple first ascents in the Pagar Valley of the Hindu Kush, and made meteorological and geological observations and sketch maps.

There have been over fifteen subsequent ascents, via a variety of routes; however there have been no recorded ascents since 1977.

== See also ==
- List of ultras of the Karakoram and Hindu Kush
