= Shah Dhar =

Mountain in the Hindu Kush range, Pakistan

Shah Dhar شاہ دھر
- Location within Pakistan

Highest point
- Elevation: 7,038 m (23,091 ft)
- Prominence: 1,562 m (5,125 ft)
- Listing: Ultra; List of mountains in Pakistan
- Coordinates: 36°40′18″N 72°13′54″E

Geography
- Location: Afghanistan–Pakistan border
- Parent range: Hindu Kush

Shah Dhar (Dari/Pashto/Urdu: شاہ دھر) is a mountain in the Hindu Kush mountains. It has an elevation of 7,038 metres (23,091 ft) and sits on the international boundary between Afghanistan and Pakistan. Shah Dhar is at a distance of 337 km from Islamabad, the Pakistani capital.

== See also ==
- List of mountains by elevation
- List of ultras of the Karakoram and Hindu Kush
