= Kharkush (Ghazni) =

Mountain of the Hindu Kush in Afghanistan

- (Dari: خر کش)
- Location within Afghanistan

Highest point
- Elevation: 4,805 m (15,764 ft)
- Parent peak: Hindu Kush
- Coordinates: 33°4′43″N 67°22′42.7″E

Geography
- Location: Ghazni Province, Afghanistan
- Parent range: Hindu Kush

Kharkush also Khaṟkus (Dari: خر کش is a mountain of the Hindu Kush in Afghanistan. It is located in Ghazni Province.

Kharkush (Ghaznī) is about 230 km southwest of Kabul, the capital of Afghanistan.
