= Hindu Raj =

Mountain range in Pakistan

Hindu Raj Mountains
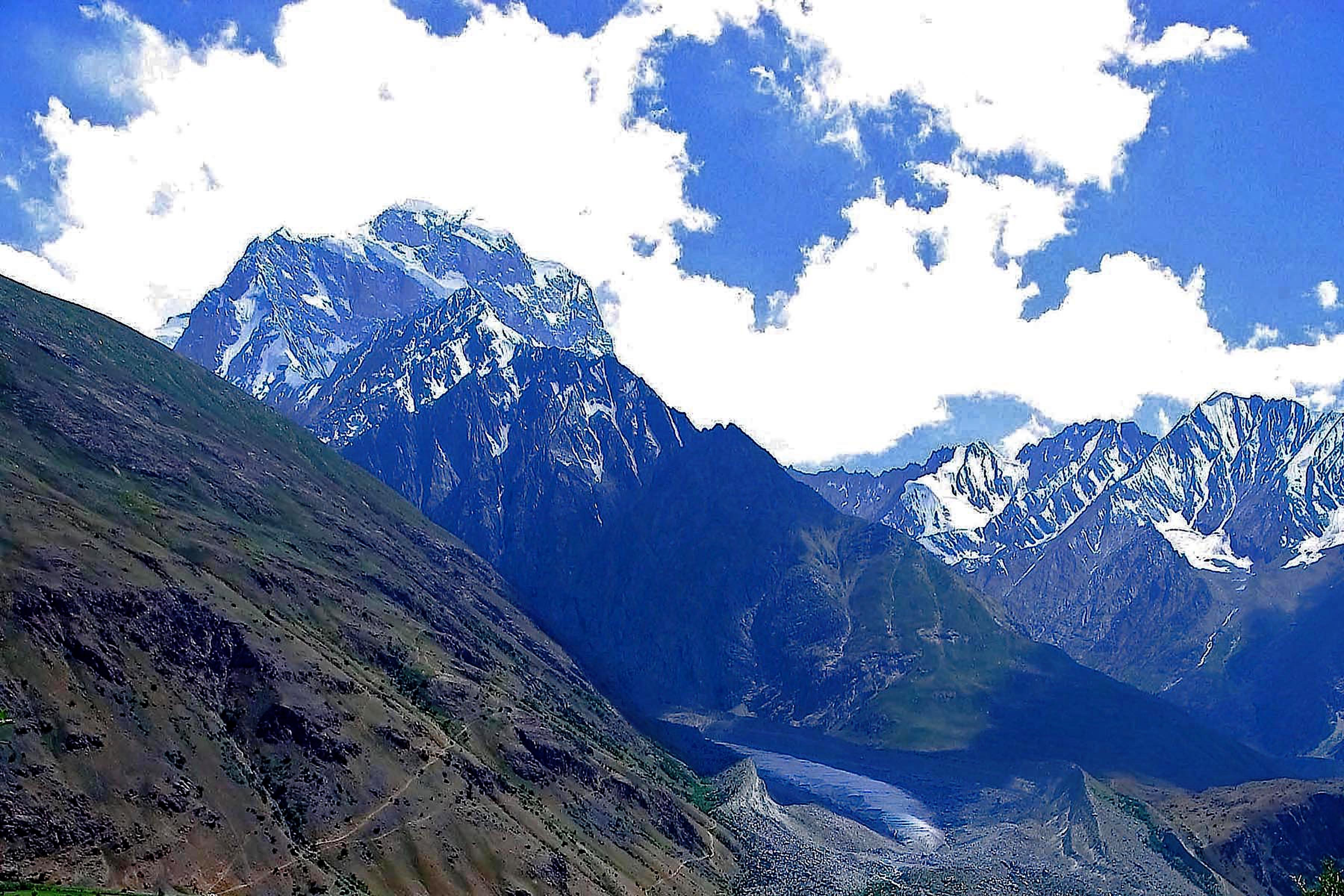
- Koyo Zom, the highest peak in Hindu Raj

Highest point
- Peak: Koyo Zom
- Elevation: 6,872 m (22,546 ft)

Naming
- Native name: سلسلہ کوہ ہندو راج (Urdu)

Geography
- Location within Pakistan
- State(s): Khyber Pakhtunkhwa, Gilgit-Baltistan (Pakistan)
- Range coordinates: 36°19′42″N 72°59′55″E

The Hindu Raj (Urdu: ہندو راج) is a mountain range in northern Pakistan, between the Hindu Kush and the Karakoram ranges. The peaks in the Hindu Raj mountains average between 5,000 and 6,000 metres in height. Its highest peak is the Koyo Zom, 6,872 m (22,546 ft).

== Etymology ==
The word Hindu is ultimately derived from the Sanskrit word Sindhu, which means "a large body of water", in reference to Sindhu (Indus River); the word raj means "rule" in Sanskrit. The origins of the current name is obscure; it was originally applied to the range by Colonel Tanner (Henry C. B. Tanner) in the late 19th century, who however admitted that the name was not generally known in the region, and might not even be correct.

== Geography ==
The Hindu Raj mountain range runs between Chitral and Gilgit; behind Darkot, south of the Pamir Mountains and east of the Hindu Kush. Its peaks rise to approximately 22,500 feet. The Hindu Raj mountains run largely parallel to the Hindu Kush mountains, sources disagree whether some peaks, including Buni Zom and Ghamubar Zom are in the Hindu Raj or the Hindu Kush. The notable passes in the range include Shandur Pass, Lowari Pass and Darkot Pass.

== Notable peaks of the Hindu Raj ==
Peak	Height (m)	Coordinates	Prominence (m)	First ascent
Koyo Zom	6,889	35°56′51″N 75°45′12″E	1,891	1968; 2019, west face
Buni Zom	6,551	36° 9′ 15″ N, 72° 19′ 39″ E	2,845	1957
Ghamubar Zom also known as Gamugal, or Dhuli Chish	6,518	36° 35′ 24″ N, 73° 20′ 30″ E	2,133	1973
Gul Lasht Zom	6,657	36° 21′ 10.8″ N, 71° 44′ 2.4″ E	1,060	1975
Thui I	6,662	36° 43' 33'' N, 73° 10' 24'' E	1,059	1975
Thui II	6,523	36° 42' 0'' N, 73° 3' 54'' E	1,272	1978
Ghamubar V (alternatively Ghamubar II)	6,400			2023
Shahan Dok (Shah Dok)	6,320	36° 26' N, 72° 52' E	1,815	1988
Chaintar Chish	6,273			1968
Garmush Zom I	6,244			1975
Karka	6,222	36° 43′ 45″ N, 73° 53′ 25″ E		2007
Garmush Zom II (Garmush Zom South)	6,180			2000
Chikar Zom	6,110			1968
Dashbar Zom	6,072			1968
Chotar Zom (Dashbar Zom)	6,058			2007
Garmush North	6,048			no ascents recorded
Shayaz	6,026	36° 39' N, 72° 50' E	1,797	1993
Uddin Zom (formerly Peak 5995 m)	6,010			2000
Matkash	6,000			1975
Kachqiant	5,990	36°37'0.25"N, 73°14'35.40"E		2018
Shahan Dok III	5,893			1986
Khache Brangsa	5,560			2001
Ghonoboro	5,500			2001
