= Tagab =

Tagab may refer to:

- Tagab District, Badakhshan, in Badakhshan Province, Afghanistan
- Tagab District, Kapisa, in Kapisa Province, Afghanistan
  - Tagab, Kapisa Province, a village in Tagab District
- Tagab, Orūzgān, a place in Orūzgān Province, Afghanistan
- Tagab Robat, a village in Badghis Province, Afghanistan
- TÅGAB, a Swedish railway company
