= Lolah-ye Gaw Kush =

Mountain in Kapisa, Afghanistan

- (Dari: لولۀ گاو کش)
- Location within Afghanistan

Highest point
- Elevation: 2,226 m (7,303 ft)
- Parent peak: Hindu Kush
- Coordinates: 35°42′34.5″N 69°23′29.3″E

Geography
- Location: Tagab, Kapisa, Afghanistan
- Parent range: Hindu Kush

Lolah-ye Gaw Kush (Dari: لولۀ گاو کش is a mountain in the Hindu Kush range in Kapisa, Afghanistan. Its name means "That which attracts the cow."
