= December 2020 Afghanistan attacks =

Targeted killings by insurgents in December 2020

December 2020 Afghanistan targeted killings
- Part of the War in Afghanistan
- Location: Afghanistan
- Date: December 2020
- Target: Afghan activists, journalists, doctors and politicians
- Attack type: Targeted killings Bombing; Shooting
- Weapons: Bomb; Shotguns
- Deaths: 30
- Injuries: 28
- Perpetrators: Islamic State of Iraq and the Levant – Khorasan Province (claimed some attacks, suspected of the others)

During the month of December 2020, a series of targeted killings were carried out in Afghanistan. While several assassinations had happened in Afghanistan over the last 20 years, targeted killings increased during this month. The Islamic State of Iraq and the Levant – Khorasan Province claimed responsibility for two of those attacks and is suspected to be behind the others. The Taliban denied their involvement in the killings.

== Timeline of the attacks ==
| Date | Location | Dead | Injured | Details |
|---|---|---|---|---|
| 10 | Jalalabad, Nangarhar Province | 2 | 0 | Malalai Maiwand, a presenter at Enikas Radio and TV in the eastern province of Nangarhar, was killed along with her driver in an attack on their vehicle in Jalalabad, during their office. Maiwand's mother, also an activist, was killed by unknown gunmen in 2015. The Islamic State claimed responsibility for Maiwand and her driver's killings. |
| 15 | Kabul, Kabul Province | 2 | 2 | Deputy Provincial Governor Mahbobullah Mohibi and his secretary were killed and two of Mohibi's bodyguards were wounded after a bomb attached to their vehicle blew up in Kabul. |
| 15 | Ghor Province | 1 | 2 | In the Ghor Province, a deputy provincial council head was killed while another council member and their driver were wounded when a sticky bomb attached to their vehicle detonated. |
| 20 | Kabul, Kabul Province | 9 | 20 | A car bombing in Kabul targeting lawmaker Khan Mohammad Wardak killed at least nine people. Wardak survived the blast but was among 20 injured including women and children. It is unclear whether the explosive was planted in a car parked on the lawmaker’s route or if a vehicle with the bomb was being driven by a bomber. |
| 21 | Ghazni, Ghazni Province | 1 | 0 | Rahmatullah Nikzad, head of the journalists’ union in Ghazni, dies after being shot three times in the chest by unknown assailants. Nikazd is the fifth journalist to have been killed in Afghanistan in the last two months, and the seventh this year. |
| 22 | Kabul, Kabul Province | 5 | 2 | Four doctors who worked at Kabul prison with hundreds of militants inmates were killed when a bomb attached to their car exploded. A civilian passerby also died in the attack. Two other people were wounded. The blast happened in a southern district of the city when the doctors were travelling to the Pul-e-Charkhi prison where they worked. The Islamic State claimed responsibility for the attack. |
| 23 | Kabul, Kabul Province | 2 | 0 | Yousuf Rasheed, CEO of the Free and Fair Election Forum of Afghanistan, was killed by unknown gunmen in Kabul city. The incident happened around 8:30am local time in the Tani Koot area in PD7 of Kabul city while he was on his way to the office and gunmen started shooting at his vehicle. His driver was also wounded in the shooting and later died of his injuries. |
| 24 | Kohistan, Kapisa Province | 2 | 0 | Gunmen on a motorbike have shot dead women’s rights activist Freshta Kohistani and her brother outside their home in Kohistan. |
| 28 | Ghazni, Ghazni Province | 2 | 0 | Unknown gunmen shot dead two revenue department workers in Ghazni City near Ghazni Police headquarters. The two attackers fled the scene. |
| 30 | Kandahar, Kandahar Province | 1 | 0 | Massoud Atal, a military pilot, was shot and killed by in a targeted killing by unidentified gunmen in PD14 of Kandahar city. |
| 31 | Kabul, Kabul Province | 1 | 1 | An IED blast targeting Jawid Wali, deputy of the coordination of advisers' affairs, critically wounds Wali and kills his driver Bahramuddin. |
| 31 | Kabul, Kabul Province | 1 | 0 | Abdi Jahid, a civil society activist from Baghlan, was killed in an attack by unknown armed men in Bostan Street in Kabul’s PD17. |
| 31 | Lashkargah, Helmand Province | 1 | 0 | Abdul Baqi, a tribal elder in Helmand, was killed in an attack by unknown armed men in Lashkargah city. |
