= Khar Kush =

- (Dari: خر کش)
- Location within Afghanistan

Highest point
- Elevation: 4,803 m (15,758 ft)
- Parent peak: Hindu Kush
- Coordinates: 35°44′41.1″N 69°40′40.3″E

Geography
- Location: Kapisa, Afghanistan
- Parent range: Hindu Kush

Khar Kush also Khaṟkus (Dari: خر کش is a mountain in the Hindu Kush range in the provinces of Baghlān and Kapisa of Afghanistan.
