= Mir Masjidi Khan =

Afghan resistance leader

Mir Masjidi Khan (died 1841) is one of many celebrated Afghan resistance leaders from Shamali Plain who opposed the installation of Shuja Shah Durrani (or 'Shah Shujah') as Emir of Afghanistan by the Government of British India during the First Anglo-Afghan War. He kept up a fierce struggle against the occupation forces in and around Kabul and Northern Afghanistan, until his death.

== Background ==
Mir Masjidi Khan was born in a Tajik family. His father, Sahibzada Ishaq Jan Khan, was a wealthy landowner of the locality and Masjidi's family was respected in the area for their Islamic learning, piety and integrity in public affairs.

Mir Masjidi's childhood years were spent in rural surroundings, in acquiring equestrian and martial skills, in addition to the study of the Quran and Sharia and of Persian literature.

Since his family was an influential one, and he was seen as dignified and trustworthy, he rose to early prominence and in due course became one of the most respected of the Afghan chiefs and notables of the period.

== Struggle and Demise ==
Initially, like most people of its time, Mir Masjidi viewed the return of Shuja Shah ('Shah Shujah') with mixed feelings: glad to have a 'legitimate' Sadozai Durrani ruler yet suspicious of the motives of the British forces which forcefully enthroned him.

Soon, however, it became apparent that the Shah was a mere figurehead, with real policy control with Sir William Hay Macnaghten and other British officers. In addition, the British garrison in Kabul offended the general social sensibilities with their excesses, in particular their liberties with women, and the populace, inflamed by the mullahs and other religious, spiritual leaders including Mir Masjidi, came out in open revolt, declaring themselves for the exiled ex-Emir Dost Mohammad Khan.

Due to his personal prowess in arms and his influential spiritual-social position, Mir Masjidi soon became one of the main leaders of the regional revolt at this time, and he fortified the Nijrab valley and other areas of Kohistan (modern-day Kapisa Province) against the British troops and refused allegiance to Shuja Shah and also organised resistance in and around Kabul town. One of the first triumphs of this resistance, under Mir Masjidi's command, was when they wiped out an expedition sent out to reduce Charikar, in which the commander of this British troop, Major Eldred Pottinger was also severely wounded. For a brief time, Mir Masjidi also gave refuge to the fugitive ex-Emir Dost Mohammad, when he had escaped from the British advance to Kabul and was in hiding in the Hindu Kush.

In 1840 the Mir was on the verge of surrendering to the British forces in Afghanistan and had negotiated the details of this surrender with Sir Alexander Burnes. However, according to Scottish historian William Dalrymple, the British refused to honor this agreement.

The Mir then became a major thorn in the side of the British garrison at Kabul, harassing them at every turn, and Macnaghten soon began to look for 'other solutions' to get rid of him and announced a big reward for him, dead or alive. Although not much came out of this at first, the British forces in collusion with some of the local chiefs who had been bribed, were able to ultimately confiscate most of Mir Masjidi's estates and property and he was reduced to living out in the hills and glens, often in dire financial straits. Around early 1841, it is alleged that Macnaghten then decided to arrange Mir Masjidi's assassination, through the diplomatic machinations of his undercover Indian special agent, Mohan Lal Zutshi under the nom de guerre "Aga Hassan Kashmiri," and Mir Masjidi was soon thereafter taken ill very suddenly and died within a day or two, probably due to poisoning.

Today, Mir Masjidi Khan is still remembered in Afghanistan and North-West Pakistan as a Ghazi (warrior) and a Shaheed (martyr) who sacrificed himself selflessly for the general good. In present-day Afghanistan, one of the nation's highest civil awards, for dedicated public service, is the 'Mir Masjidi Khan Award', in recognition of his historical stature and role.

== See also ==
- The Great Game
- Anglo-Afghan Wars
- Kabul Uprisings (1841)
