= Kishiktan =

- Location in Afghanistan
- Coordinates: 35°2′48″N 69°17′31″E
- Country: Afghanistan
- Province: Kapisa Province
- District: Hesa Duwum Kohistan District
- Elevation: 4,770 ft (1,454 m)

Population
  - Total: 500
- Time zone: UTC+4:30

Kishiktan (کشکتان) or Kesektan is the center of the newly created Hesa Duwum Kohistan District in Kapisa Province, Afghanistan. It is located on 35.0467°N 69.2919°E at 1454 m altitude.
