= Farahnaz Forotan =

Afghan journalist

- فرحناز فروتن
- Born: 1992 (age 33–34); Kabul, Afghanistan
- Education: International relations
- Occupations: Journalist and human rights' activist
- Organization(s): Ariana & ATN NEWS
- Notable work: Investigative documentary on the lives of Taliban prisoners
- Television: ATN

External videos
- "MyRedLine is my pen!", Farahnaz Forotan, February 23, 2021
- ”Meet the Afghan Women Fighting to Protect Their Rights”, By Cora Engelbrecht, Yousur Al-Hlou and Ben Laffin, The New York Times, July 13, 2019

Farahnaz Forotan (Arabic: فرحناز فروتن; born 1992) is an Afghan journalist and women's rights activist. She moved to Iran together with her family during the Mujahideen regime. Farahnaz returned to Afghanistan in 2001, but took refuge in France in 2020 after being included on a Taliban's target list.

== Early life ==
In 1996, when Farahnaz was three and the Taliban arrived in her home town, Kabul, she and her family migrated to Iran due to the civil war in Afghanistan. Farahnaz and her sisters were denied an education by the authorities due to their refugee status. She was eventually able to continue school from grades one through four, in a private Afghan school with very limited resources. At first, students sat on the floor because there were no tables or chairs.

== Career ==
Farahnaz Forotan worked at three of the main television broadcasting stations in Afghanistan between 2012 and 2020, including Ariana Television Network. She has hosted major talk shows including Purso Pal for TOLOnews and Goft-i Go-i Wehza (Special talk) and the weekly program Kabul Debate for 1TV.

Farahnaz has traveled throughout the country and abroad to report on Afghanistan-related stories, including reporting from the Sangin District of Helmand when it was a dangerous war zone held by the Taliban. Her courage was commended by the team's leader, Bismillah Mohammadi, after he unsuccessfully ordered her to stay behind.

She rose to prominence with an investigative documentary on the lives of Taliban prisoners, which dissected their thought-process and rationale for targeting not only Afghan and international forces, but also the general public in Afghanistan.

As of 2019, Farahnaz was a student at a private university in Kabul as well as a practising journalist. In 2019 and 2020, Farahnaz conducted a social media campaign and travelled the country collecting testimonies from women, in an attempt to prevent the Taliban from using the Afghan peace process to roll back freedoms for women that had been acquired since the fall of the Taliban. The testimonies were used to lobby Afghan leaders, foreign diplomats and civil society groups, and Farahnaz's campaign had the backing of UN Women Afghanistan. In 2019, The New York Times reported that her social media campaign, known as #myredline, "implores women to stand up for their rights." On April 4, 2019, Reuters reported she "launched the movement by declaring that her pen, symbolic of her profession, was her red line." On April 21, 2019, Farahnaz told AFP that President Ashraf Ghani had tweeted that women's rights were a "red line" in the peace process.

She has been inspired by the work of other women such as Shakila Ibrahimkhail. On July 24, 2018 Farahnaz was one of thirteen Afghan women leaders who met with Canadian Status of Women Minister Maryam Monsef to discuss challenges facing Afghan women. In 2019 she and Ferdous Samim co-founded the Taak Foundation to raise awareness of fundamental rights through public education and engagement.

On November 9, 2020, Farahnaz received a call from the Afghan Journalists Safety Committee, which informed her that according to foreign intelligence services, she was on the Taliban's blacklist of people, that The New York Times described as a "hit list," which forced her to take refuge in Paris, France. Targeted killings of journalists, activists, and prominent women in other fields have surged since the February 2020 peace agreement negotiated between the Taliban and the United States under former president Donald Trump. Targeted killings in December 2020 included journalists Malalai Maiwand of Enikass Radio and TV and Rahmatullah Nikzad, chief of the Ghazni Journalists' Union. An attack on March 2, 2021 killed Mursal Hakimi, Sadia Shanat, and Shanaz Raofi of Enikass Radio and TV.
