= Kingdom of Kapisa =

Ancient kingdom in modern-day Afghanistan

The Kingdom of Kapisa, appearing in contemporary Chinese sources as Caoguo (漕國) and Jibin (罽賓), was a state located in what is now Afghanistan during the late 1st millennium. Its capital was the city of Kapisa. The kingdom stretched from the Hindu Kush in the north to Bamiyan and Kandahar in the south and west, out as far as the modern Jalalabad District in the east.

The name Kapisa appears to be a Sanskritized form of an older name for the area, from prehistory. Following its conquest in 329 BC by Alexander the Great, Bagram and the surrounding area were known in the Hellenic world as Alexandria on the Caucasus in reference to the Hindu Kush as the "Indic Caucasus", although the older name appears to have survived.

In the early 7th century, the Chinese Buddhist monk Xuanzang made a pilgrimage to Kapisa, and described there the cultivation of rice and wheat, and a king of the Suli tribe. In his chronicle, he relates that in Kapisa were over 6,000 monks of the Mahayana school of Buddhism. In a 7th-century Chinese chronicle, the Book of Sui, Kapisa appears as the realm of Cao (Middle Chinese pronunciation *Dzaw). In other Chinese works, it is called Jibin (*Kjej-pjin), a name appearing as early as the Book of Han (Old Chinese *Krads-pin or Krats-pin) in reference to Kashmir and surrounding areas.

Between the 7th and 9th centuries, the kingdom was ruled by the Turk Shahi dynasty. At one point, Bagram was the capital of the kingdom, though in the 7th century, the center of power of Kapisa shifted to Kabul.

== Kapisi ==
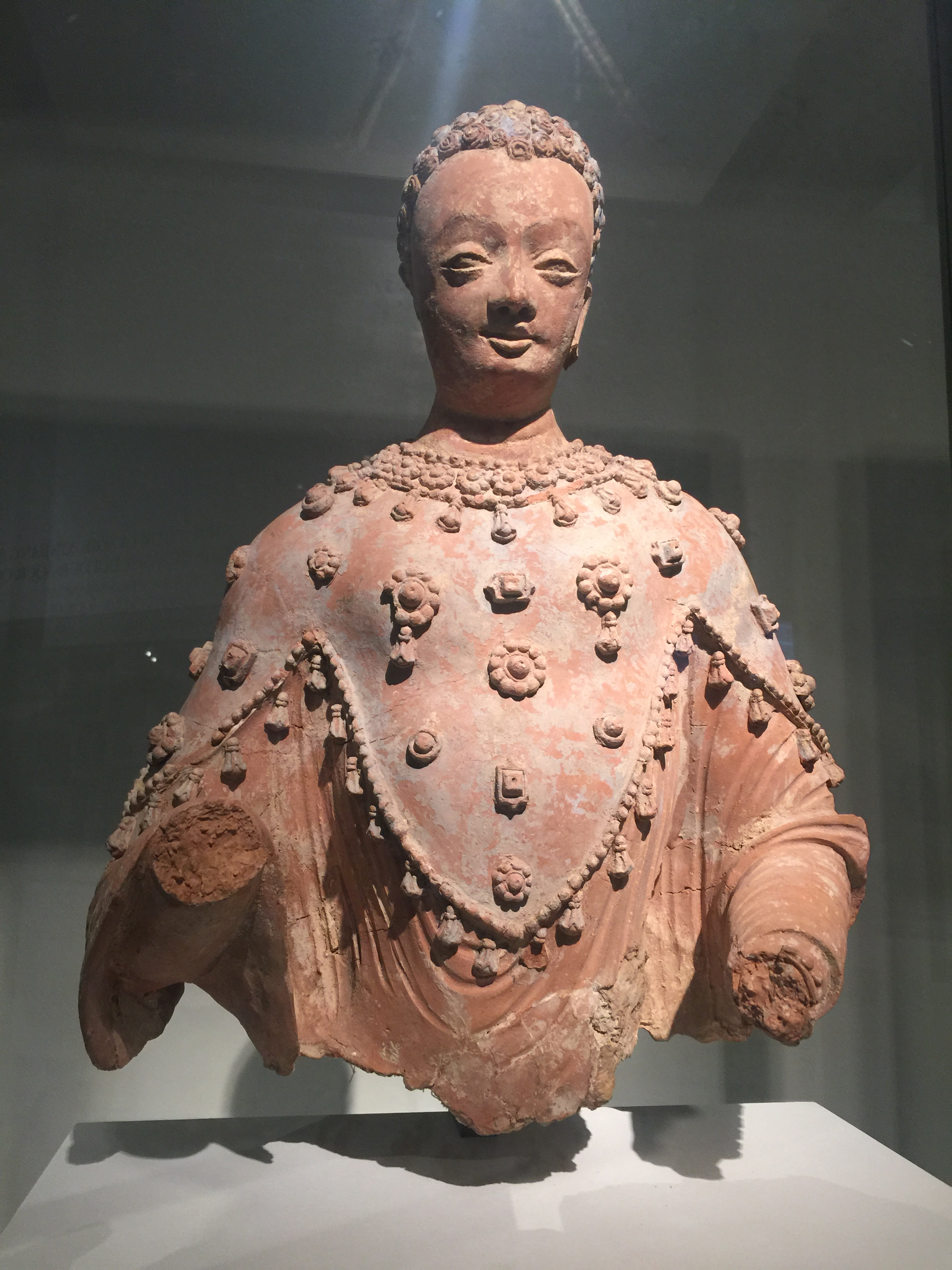
Statue of Buddha found in the monastery of Fondukistan, Gurband Valley, Parwan. 7th century. Guimet Museum.

Kapisi (Sanskrit: कापिशी, romanized: Kāpiśī; Chinese: 迦畢試, romanized: Jiapishi) or Kapisa was the capital city of the Kingdom of Kapisa. While the name of the kingdom has been used for the modern Kapisa Province in Afghanistan, the ancient city of Kapisa was located in Parwan Province, in or near present-day Bagram.

The first references to Kapisa appear in the writings of 5th-century BC Indian scholar Pāṇini. Pāṇini refers to the city of Kāpiśī, a city of the Kapisa kingdom. Pāṇini also refers to Kāpiśāyana, a famous wine from Kapisa. The city of Kapiśi also appeared as Kaviśiye on Indo-Greek coins of Apollodotus/Eucratides, as well as the Nezak Huns.

Archeology discoveries in 1939 confirmed that the city of Kapisa was an emporium for Kapiśayana wine, discovering numerous glass flasks, fish-shaped wine jars, and drinking cups typical of the wine trade of the era. The grapes (Kāpiśāyanī Drakṣa) and wine (Kāpiśāyanī Madhu) of the area are referred to by several works of ancient Indian literature. The Mahabharata also noted the common practice of slavery in the city. The Begram ivories, inlays surviving from burnt furniture, were important artistic finds.

In later times, Kapisa seems to have been part of a kingdom ruled by a Buddhist Kshatriya king holding sway over ten neighboring states including Lampaka, Nagarahara, Gandhara and Banu, according to the Chinese pilgrim Xuan Zang who visited in 644 AD. Xuan Zang notes the Shen breed of horses from the area, and also notes the production of many types of cereals and fruits, as well as a scented root called Yu-kin.

The Mahābhārata, particularly the Drona Parva, explicitly refers to Rājapura as the capital of the Kamboja kingdom, describing Kamboja as a centralized polity with organized cavalry forces and sustained military participation alongside Bāhlika, Pahlava, Śaka, and Yavana groups. This context requires Rājapura to have been a major political and logistical center situated on transregional routes of the Uttarāpatha, rather than a minor or isolated settlement. Some modern scholarship has identified Rājapura with present-day Rajouri, largely on the basis of name similarity. However, this identification has been increasingly questioned, as Rajouri lacks independent textual, archaeological, Greek, or Chinese attestations linking it to the Kambojas, and it does not correspond to the geographic, economic, or strategic profile consistently associated with Kamboja in ancient sources. By contrast, a substantial body of linguistic, textual, and historical evidence supports the identification of Rājapura with Kapisa (also known as Kapisha or Ki-pin in Chinese sources). Classical Chinese accounts, most notably those of Xuanzang, describe Kapisa as a major kingdom located south of the Hindu Kush and north of Gandhāra, functioning as a political and commercial hub linking India, Central Asia, and Iran. Multiple Sanskrit, Buddhist, Greek, and Chinese sources equate Kapisa with Kamboja, including the Mahāmāyūrī, Rāmāyaṇa-mañjarī of Kṣemendra, and the geographical notices of Ptolemy, who distinguishes northern and southern Kamboja regions across the Hindu Kush.Scholars such as Sylvain levi, Moti Chandra, and K. C. Mishra, as well as the History and Culture of the Indian People series, have therefore concluded that Kapisa and Kamboja are equivalent geographical designations, and that Kapisa represents the historical capital zone of the Kambojas. This identification accounts for Kamboja's repeated association with Bactria, Paropamisadae, Parthia, Scythian regions, and Indo-Greek corridors, and coherently explains its prominent military and economic role in the Mahābhārata.

Accordingly, while the Rajouri identification is based primarily on toponymic resemblance, the identification of Rājapura with Kapisa is supported by converging evidence from Indian epic literature Mahabharata, Buddhist texts, Greco-Roman geography, and Chinese travel accounts Xuanzang, making it the more consistent and widely corroborated location for the Kamboja capital.

== Etymology ==
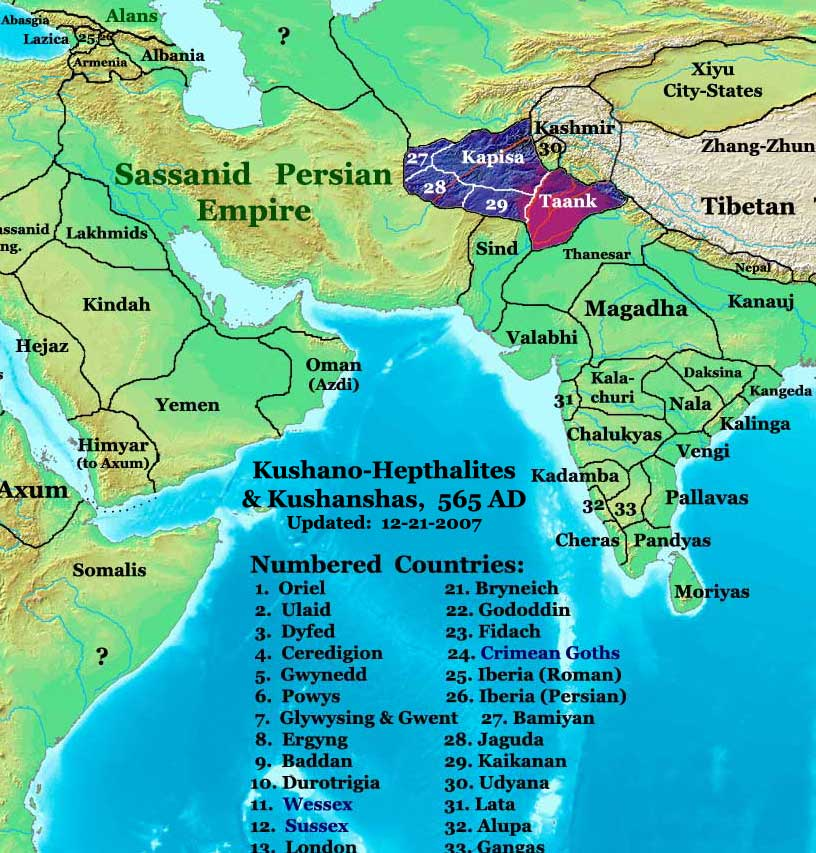
Asia in 565 AD, showing Kapisa and its neighbors.

Scholar community holds that Kapisa is equivalent to Sanskrit Kamboja. In other words, Kamboja and Kapisa are believed to be two attempts to render the same foreign word (which could not appropriately be transliterated into Sanskrit). Historian S. Levi further holds that old Persian Ka(m)bujiya or Kau(n)bojiya, Sanskrit Kamboja as well as Kapisa, all etymologically refer to the same foreign word.

Even the evidence from the 3rd-century Buddhist tantra text Mahamayuri (which uses Kabusha for Kapisha) and the Ramayana-manjri by Sanskrit Acharya, Kshemendra of Kashmir (11th century), which specifically equates Kapisa with Kamboja, thus substituting the former with the latter, therefore, sufficiently attest that Kapisa and Kamboja are equivalent. Even according to illustrious Indian history series: History and Culture of Indian People, Kapisa and Kamboja are equivalent. Scholars like Dr Moti Chandra, Dr Krishna Chandra Mishra etc. also write that the Karpasika (of Mahabharata) and Kapisa (Ki-pin/Ka-pin/Chi-pin of the Chinese writings) are synonymous terms.

Thus, both Karpasika and Kapisa are essentially equivalent to Sanskrit Kamboja. And Pāṇinian term Kapiśi is believed to have been the capital of ancient Kamboja. Kapisa (Ki-pin, Ke-pin, Ka-pin, Chi-pin of the Chinese records), in fact, refers to the Kamboja kingdom, located on the south-eastern side of the Hindukush in the Paropamisadae region. It was anciently inhabited by the Aśvakayana (Greek: Assakenoi), and the Aśvayana (Greek Aspasio) (q.v.) sub-tribes of the Kambojas. Epic Mahabharata refers to two Kamboja settlements: one called Kamboja, adjacent to the Daradas (of Gilgit), extending from Kafiristan to south-east Kashmir including Rajauri/Poonch districts, while the original Kamboja, known as Parama Kamboja was located north of Hindukush in Transoxiana territory mainly in Badakshan and Pamirs/Allai valley, as neighbors to the Rishikas in the Scythian land. Even Ptolemy refers to two Kamboja territories/and or ethnics - viz.: (1) Tambyzoi, located north of Hindukush on Oxus in Bactria/Badakshan and (2) Ambautai located on southern side of Hindukush in Paropamisadae. Even the Komoi clan of Ptolemy, inhabiting towards Sogdiana mountainous regions, north of Bactria, is believed by scholars to represent the Kamboja people.

With passage of time, the Paropamisan settlements came to be addressed as Kamboja proper, whereas the original Kamboja settlement lying north of Hindukush, in Transoxiana, became known as 'Parama-Kamboja' i.e. furthest Kamboja. Some scholars call Parama Kamboja as 'Uttara-Kamboja' i.e. northern Kamboja or Distant Kamboja. The Kapisa-Kamboja equivalence also applies to the Paropamisan Kamboja settlement.

== Physical characteristics of the people of Kapiśa ==
The surviving account of the travels of the Chinese Buddhist pilgrim Xuanzang says that "the people of Kapiśa (Kai-pi-chi(h)) are cruel and fierce; their language is coarse and rude. Their marriage ceremonies are mere intermingling of sexes. Their literature is like that of Tukhara country but the customs, the common language, and rule of behavior are somewhat different. For clothing they use hair garments (wool); their garments are trimmed with furs. In commerce, they use gold and silver coins and also little copper coins. Xuanzang further writes that the king of Kapisa is Kshatriya by caste. He is of shrewd character (nature) and being brave and determined, he has brought into subjection the neighboring countries, some ten of which he rules ".

According to scholars, much of the description of the people from Kapiśa to Rajapura as given by Xuanzang agrees well with the characteristics of the Kambojas described in the Buddhist text, Bhuridatta Jataka as well in the great Indian epic Mahabharata. Moreover, the Drona Parava of Mahabharata specifically attests that Rajapuram was a metropolitan city of the epic Kambojas. The Rajapuram (=Rajapura) of Mahabharata (Ho-b-she-pu-lo of Xuanzang) has been identified with modern Rajauri in south-western Kashmir. Culturally speaking, Kapiśa had significant Iranian influence.

== The early Shahis of Kapiśa/Kabul ==
The affinities of the earlier shahi rulers (the so-called Turk Shahi) of Kapisa/Kabul, who are believed to have probably ruled from the early 5th century till 870, are still not clear. All ancient sources unequivocally agree that the rulers of Kapisa were Kshatriyas from India and claimed descent from Ayodhya. Panini, writing in 5th century BC, Chinese travellers visiting the kings many centuries later and even Kalhana writing five centuries after the Chinese travellers agree on their Kshatriya origins from India.

While their ethnicities were probably mixed, they practiced both Buddhism and Hinduism like the rest of India. The different scholars link their affinities to different ethnics. 11th-century Muslim historiographer Alberuni's confused accounts on the early history of Shahis based mainly as they are on folklore, do not inspire much confidence on the precise identity of the early Shahis of Kapisa/Kabul. They call them as Hindus on the one hand and claim their descent from the Turks, while at the same time, they also claim their origin/descent from Tibet.

Some authors have suggested that the Kushan Empire and/or the Kaṭa (Kaṭor/Kaṭir) tribe, of Bashgul Valley, in Nuristan were the origins of the Shahis. V. A. Smith calls the early Shahis a cadet branch of the Kushanas, without providing evidence for this. H. M. Elliot links the Shahis to both the Kata and the Kushanas. George Scott Robertson states that the Kata belong to the Siyaposh (Siah-Posh), a Hindu tribal grouping. Charles Fredrick Oldham identifies the Shahis with the Katas and the Takkas of Punjab, whom Oldham describes as Naga-worshippers. (Oldham further claims links between the Katas and/or Takkas and the Hazaras [the "Naga-cum-Sun worshipping Urasas"], Abhisara, Gandharas, Kambojas and Daradas.)

D. B. Pandey traces the affinities of the early Kabul Shahis to the Hunas. Bishan Singh and K. S. Dardi etc. connect the Kabul Shahis to the ancient Kshatriya clans of the Kambojas/Gandharas. The 7th-century Chinese Buddhist pilgrim Xuanzang, who visited India (629 AD - 645 AD) calls the ruler of Kapisa as Buddhist and of a Kshatriya caste. Kalhana, the 12th-century Kashmirian historian and author of the famous Rajatarangini, also calls the Shahis of Gandhara/Waihind as Kshatriyas. These early references from different sources link them as Kshatriya ruler and his dynasty undoubtedly to Hindu lineage. Further, though Kalhana takes the history of the Shahis to the year AD 730 or earlier, but he does not refer to any supplanting of the Shahi dynasty at any time in the entire history of the Shahis.

Ancient Indian sources such as Pāṇini's Astadhyayi, Harivamsa, Vayu Purana, Manusmriti, Mahabharata, and Kautiliya's Arthashastra name the Kambojas and the Gandharas as Kshatriyas. According to Olaf Caroe, "the earlier Kabul Shahis, in some sense, were the inheritors of the Kushana-Hephthalite chancery tradition and had brought in more Hinduised form with time. There does not yet exist in the upper Kabul valley any documentary evidence or any identifiable coinage which can establish the exact affinities of these early Shahis who ruled there during the first two Islamic centuries."

The affinities of the early Shahis of Kapisa/Kabul are still speculative, and the inheritance of the Kushan-Hephthalite chancery tradition and political institutions by Kabul Shahis do not necessarily connect them to the preceding dynasty i.e. the Kushanas or Hephthalites. From the 5th century to about the year 794, their capital was Kapisa, the ancient home of the cis-Hindukush Kambojas – popularly also known as Ashvakas. After the Arab Moslems began raiding the Shahi kingdom, the Shahi ruler of Kapisa moved their capital to Kabul (until 870 AD). Alberuni's accounts further claim that the last king of the early Shahiya dynasty was king Lagaturman (Katorman) who was overthrown and imprisoned by his Brahmin vizier called Kallar. Alberuni's reference to the Brahman vizier as having taken over the control of the Shahi dynasty, in fact, may be a reference to Kallar (and his successors) as having been followers of Brahmanical religion in contrast to Shahi Katorman (Lagaturman) or his predecessors Shahi rulers, who were undoubtedly staunch Buddhists. It is very likely that a change in religion may have been confused with change in dynasty. In any case, this started the line of so-called Hindu Shahi rulers, according to Alberuni's accounts.

== See also ==
- Etymology of Kapisa
- Kapisa Province (modern Afghanistan)
