= Koh Band District =

- District
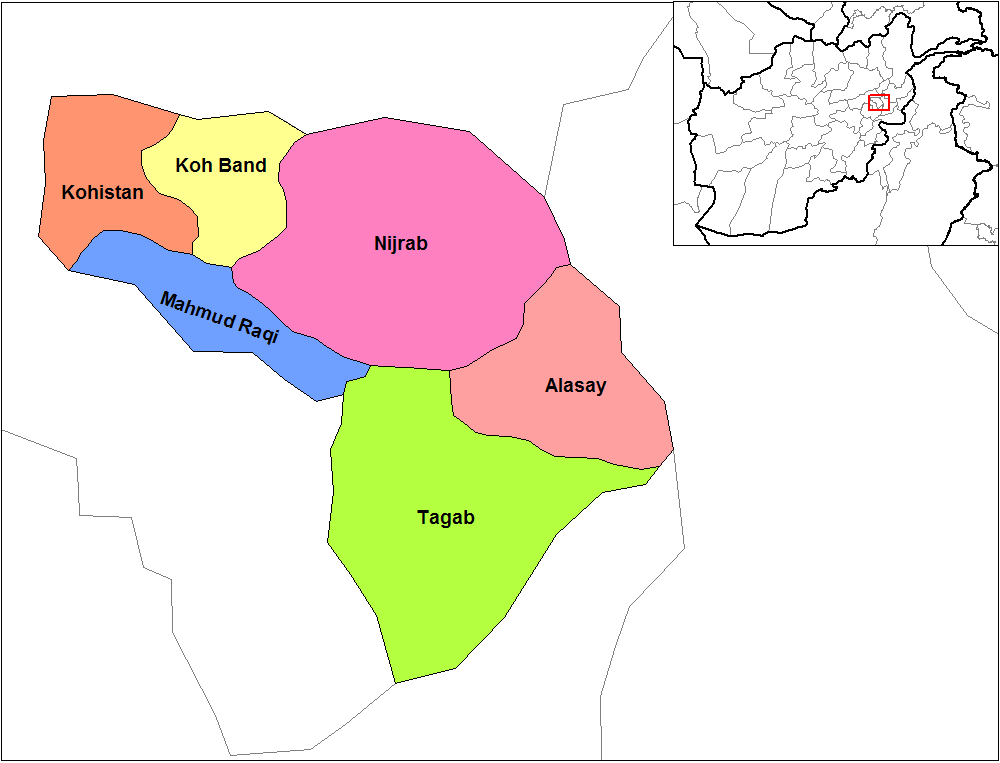
- Koh Band district (in yellow)
- Country: Afghanistan
- Region: Kapisa Province
- Capital: Hajjikheyl

Population (2006)
  - Total: 20,800

Kohband District is situated in the northwestern part of Kapisa Province, Afghanistan. It borders Kohistan District to the west, Parvan Province to the north, Nijrab District to the east and Mahmud Raqi District to the south. The population is 26,133 (2019). The district center is Hajjikheyl (35.1094°N 69.4275°E) located in the western part of the district. The people mostly speak the Pashayi language.
