= Freshta Kohistani =

Afghan women's rights activist (1991–2020)

Freshta Kohistani (Pashto: فرشته کوهستانی; 1991 – 24 December 2020) was an Afghan woman's rights activist and a pro-democracy advocate, who had frequently spoken against a wave of assassinations in Afghanistan. She was herself assassinated at the age of 29.

Kohistani frequently organised events in the capital, Kabul, advocating women's rights in Afghanistan. She also used social media as a platform for her message and had a large following.

In December 2020, she was shot and killed near her home by gunmen on a motorbike in the Hesa Awal Kohistan District of Kapisa province in Afghanistan; she was 29 years old. Her brother was also killed in the attack. The gunmen escaped. Before her death, Kohistani had asked for protection from the authorities after receiving threats.
