= Baktash Siawash =

Afghan politician (born 1983)

Baktash Siawash بکتاش سیاوش
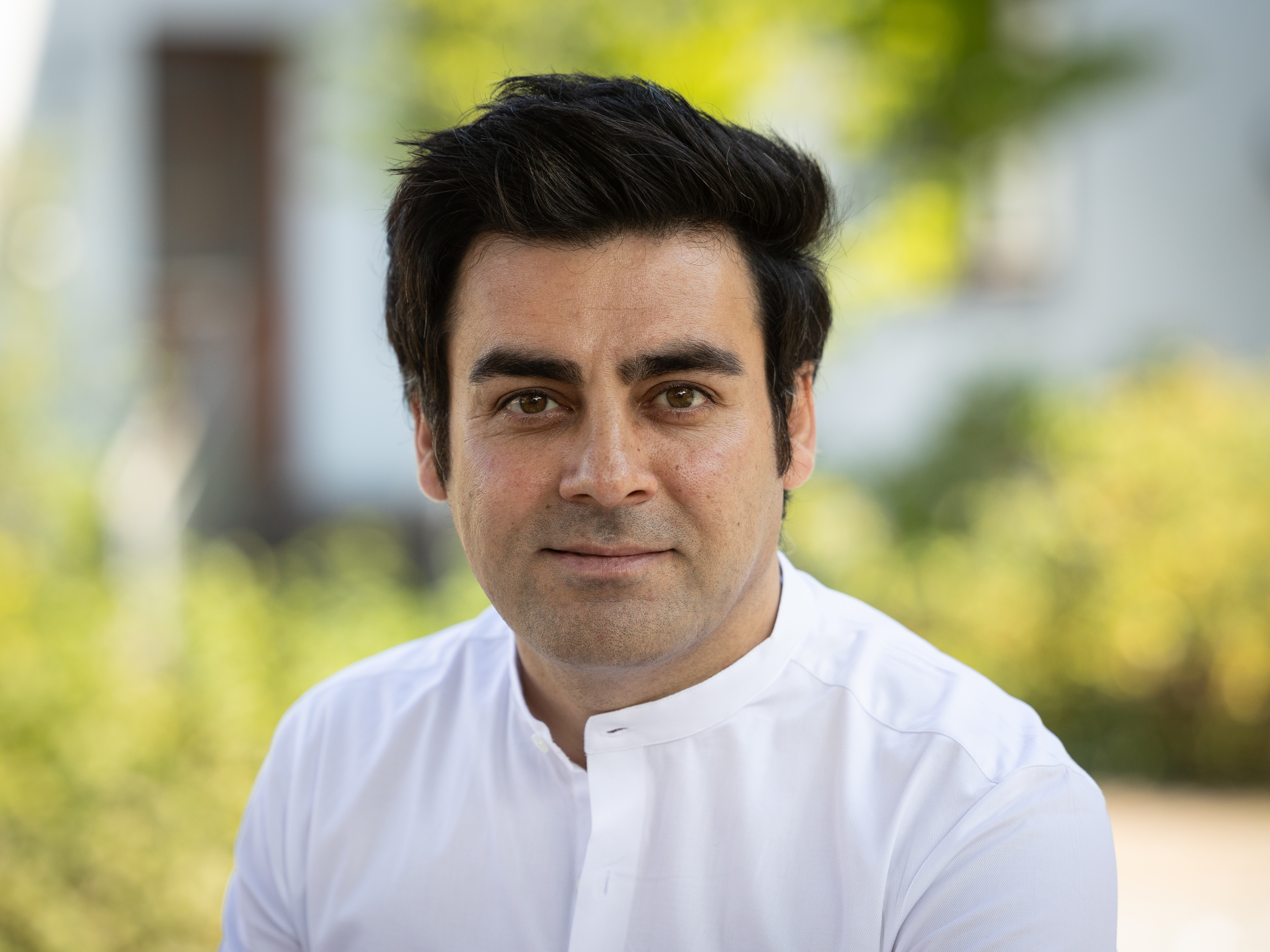
- Baktash Siawash at the Hausacher Leselenz 2023

National Assembly (Afghanistan)

Personal details
- Born: 1983 (age 42–43) Kapisa Province, Afghanistan
- Occupation: Politician, Journalist

Baktash Siawash (Persian: بکتاش سیاوش; born 1983 in Kapisa Province) was the youngest member of the Afghanistan Parliament. He was previously a journalist and anchored of political shows on TOLO TV he is now senior political adviser of the speaker of wolsi Jirga (House of Representative) and the founder of the Cultural Front of Afghanistan.

His brother Yama Siawash was murdered in 2020.
