= Mahmud Raqi =

Mahmud Raqi محمود راقی
- Provincial capital
- Location in Afghanistan
- Coordinates: 35°1′14″N 69°19′50″E
- Country: Afghanistan
- Province: Kabul
- District: Mahmud Raqi

Government
  - Type: Municipality

Area
  - Land: 15 sq mi (40 km^{2})
- Elevation: 4,760 ft (1,450 m)

Population (2025)
  - Provincial capital: 79,313
  - Urban: 1,992
  - Rural: 77,321
  - Main languages: Dari; Pashto; Pashayi
- Time zone: UTC+04:30 (Afghanistan Time)
- ISO 3166 code: AF-MMR

Mahmud Raqi (Note: Pashto: محمودراقي, romanized: Mahmudrāqi, pronounced [mɐ(h)ˌmudɾɑˈqi]; Dari: محمودراقی, romanized: Mahmūdrāqī, cyrillized: Маҳмудроқӣ, pronounced [mɑ(ɦ)ˌmuːdɾɑːˈqiː]) is a city in the northeastern part of Afghanistan, serving as the capital of Kapisa Province. It is within the jurisdiction of Mahmud Raqi District and has an estimated population of 79,313 people.

Located to the northeast of Kabul, Mahmud Raqi is classified as an urban village. In 2015 there were about 5,610 dwelling units in the city.

On 15 August 2021, Mahmud Raqi became the thirtieth provincial capital to be recaptured by the Taliban as part of the wider 2021 Taliban offensive.

== Geography ==
Mahmud Raqi is located next to the Panjshir River in the northeastern part of Afghanistan, within the jurisdiction of Mahmud Raqi District. It is administratively divided into 4 municipal districts (nahias), covering a land area of 40 km^{2} (15 sq mi) or 3,970 ha (9,800 acres).

Mahmud Raqi is approximately 16.4 km (10.2 mi) to the northeast of Bagram, 21.3 km (13.2 mi) to the east of Charikar and 74 km (46 mi) north of Kabul City.

Around 72% of the city is considered agricultural land. Dwellings are dispersed throughout the municipality with low density and consisting entirely of irregular houses.

=== Climate ===
Mahmude Raqi has a hot-summer humid continental climate (Köppen Dsa). The annual mean temperature is 12.0 °C (53.6 °F). The temperature are highest on average in July at around 25.0 °C (77.0 °F). At −2.3 °C (27.9 °F) on average, January is the coldest month of the year.

Climate data for Mahmude Raqi
Month	Jan	Feb	Mar	Apr	May	Jun	Jul	Aug	Sep	Oct	Nov	Dec	Year
Mean daily maximum °C (°F)	4.6 (40.3)	5.5 (41.9)	12.2 (54.0)	19.0 (66.2)	25.5 (77.9)	30.2 (86.4)	32.8 (91.0)	31.9 (89.4)	27.8 (82.0)	21.4 (70.5)	13.6 (56.5)	8.1 (46.6)	19.4 (66.9)
Daily mean °C (°F)	−2.3 (27.9)	−0.9 (30.4)	5.1 (41.2)	11.4 (52.5)	17.4 (63.3)	22.1 (71.8)	25.0 (77.0)	24.2 (75.6)	20.0 (68.0)	13.8 (56.8)	6.5 (43.7)	1.3 (34.3)	12.0 (53.5)
Mean daily minimum °C (°F)	−9.1 (15.6)	−7.3 (18.9)	−2.0 (28.4)	3.8 (38.8)	9.3 (48.7)	14.0 (57.2)	17.1 (62.8)	16.4 (61.5)	12.2 (54.0)	6.1 (43.0)	−0.6 (30.9)	−5.5 (22.1)	4.5 (40.2)
Average precipitation mm (inches)	50 (2.0)	72 (2.8)	73 (2.9)	51 (2.0)	23 (0.9)	6 (0.2)	2 (0.1)	1 (0.0)	3 (0.1)	9 (0.4)	20 (0.8)	29 (1.1)	339 (13.3)
Average relative humidity (%)	48	55	54	45	34	26	24	24	24	29	38	41	37
Mean daily sunshine hours	7.9	7.9	9.1	10.5	12.1	12.9	12.7	12.0	11.1	10.0	8.5	8.1	10.2
Source: Climate-Data.org

== See also ==
- List of cities in Afghanistan
- Kapisa Women's Center
