= Kohistan District, Kapisa =

Kohistan District ولسوالی کوهستان
- District
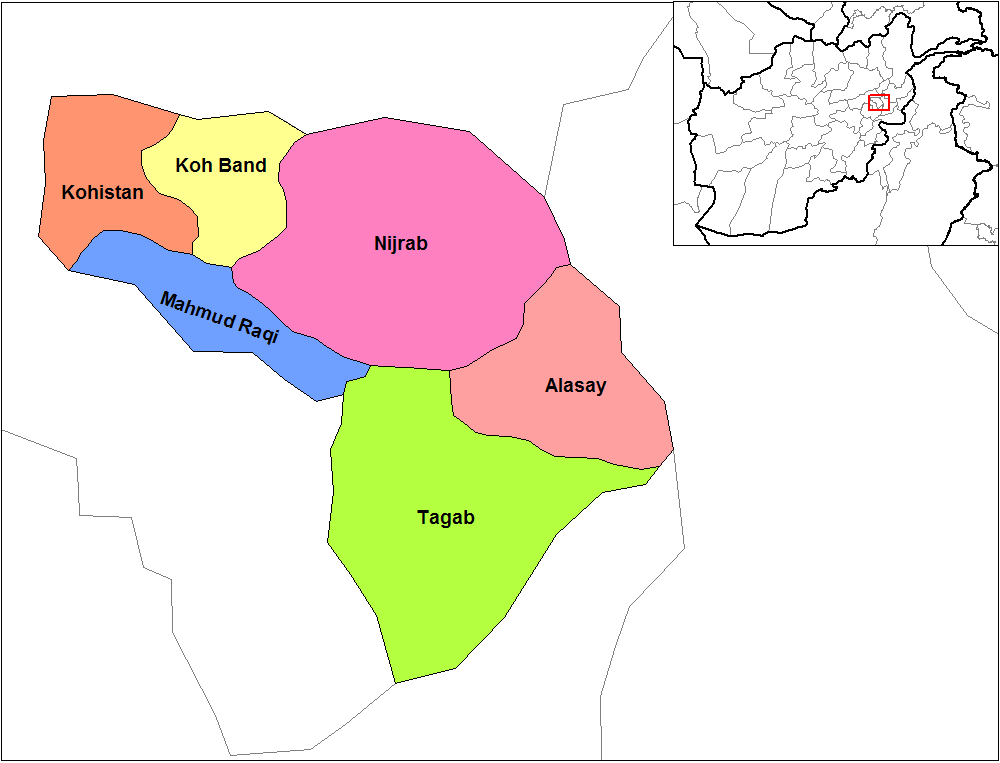
- Location in Kapisa Province

- Location in Afghanistan
- Coordinates: 35°7′N 69°18′E
- Country: Afghanistan
- province: Kapisa
- Dissolution: 2005
- Divided into: 2 Districts (Hesa Awal Kohistan District; Hesa Duwum Kohistan District)

Government
  - Type: District Council
  - Body: District

Area
  - Total: 126 km^{2} (49 sq mi)
- Elevation: 1,534 m (5,033 ft)

Population (2005)
  - Total: 82,416
  - Density: 654/km^{2} (1,690/sq mi)

Time zone
- Time in Afghanistan: UTC+04:30

Kohistān District, also transliterated Kuhistān, Kuhiston (Persian: ولسوالی کوهستان 'mountainous land'), was a former district in Kapisa province, Afghanistan. It was bordered by Panjshir province in the north, Mahmud Raqi District in the south, Parwan province in the east and southeast, and Koh Band District in the west and southwest. In 2005, the district was divided into two districts, the Hesa Awal Kohistan District and the Hesa Duwum Kohistan District. The mountains are located 1,534 meters above sea level.

== Geography ==
The district is on the border of Parwan and Panjshir provinces.

== History ==
The Kohistāni Tajiks proved to be the most powerful and best organized groups that fought against the British occupation of Kabul in 1879 to 1880 in the Second Anglo-Afghan War. During the war against USSR, Kohistān was one of the strongholds and headquarters for the Mujaheddin and later on it was one of the last remaining areas that was not in control of the Taliban. The district was the front line against the Taliban, the people in district fought very hard and bravely to counter the attacks of the Taliban many times; and in one particular case the people of the district were forced to evacuate their homes and villages completely because of a Taliban attack.

In 2005 the district was dissolved and was split into two new districts:

- Hesa Awal Kohistan District
- Hesa Duwum Kohistan District
