= Nijrab District =

Nijrab نجراب
- District
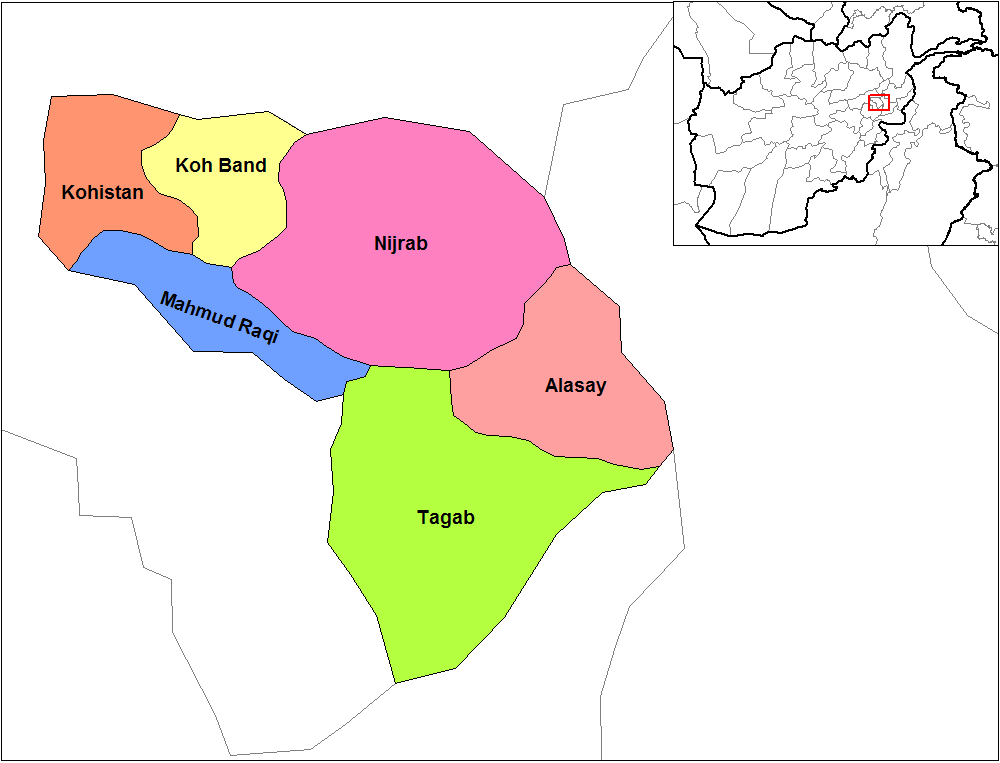
- Nijrab District (in pink)
- Country: Afghanistan
- Region: Kapisa Province
- Capital: Nijrab

Population (2006)
  - Total: 99,600

Nijrab District is situated in the central part of Kapisa, Afghanistan. It is located in a valley about 120 kilometres (75 mi) northeast of Kabul. It borders Mahmud Raqi and Koh Band districts to the west, Parwan Province to the north, Laghman Province and Alasay District to the east and Tagab District to the south. The district center is Nijrab, located in the southern part of the district. As of the 2006 census, the population of Nijrab District numbered at 99,600, making it the most populous district of Kapisa.

== Geography ==
Many areas in Nijrab are inaccessible due to the district's rugged terrain. The mountains that form the boundary with Laghman Province are the highest points in the district and reach a height of around 14,000 feet (4,300 m). Snowfall on the mountains melts slowly and flows into the valleys below. The farmers in Nijrab irrigate the melted snow to water their fields. The total population in Nijrab was a lot more than 100,000 back in 1950-1960s.

Rivers from the nearby Hindu Kush mountains and springs provide the majority of drinking water for district residents; however, hundreds of hand pump wells have been installed by the National Solidarity Program (NSP). Kapisa and Parwan PRT funded several more wells in late 2008 for Afghania.

== Demographics ==
The population of Nijrab District consists of Pashtuns, Tajiks, Pashai, Parachi and Nuristanis.

== Economy ==
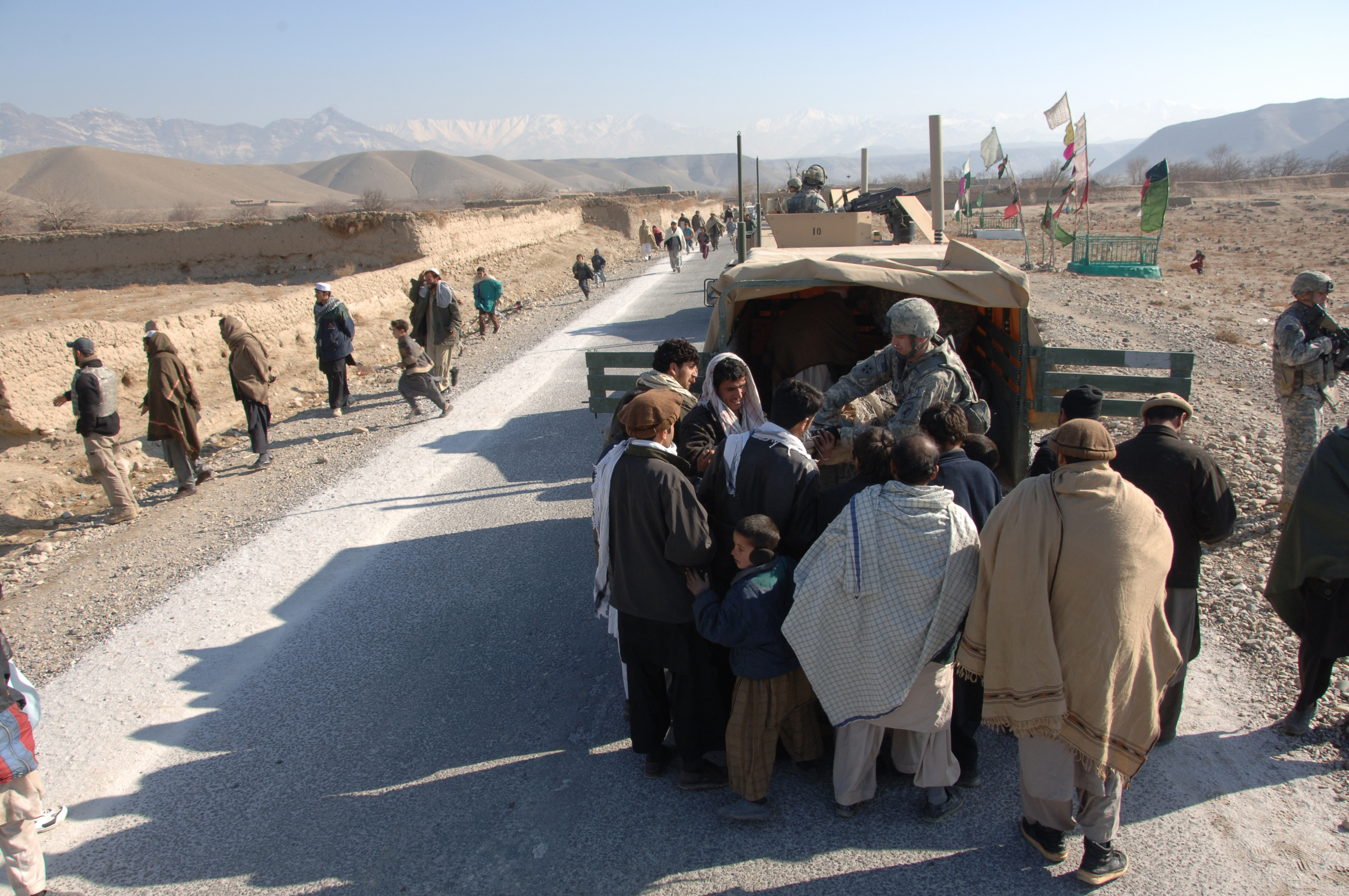
Local villagers receive humanitarian aid from the Bagram Provincial Reconstruction Team in the village of Nijrab in the Kapisa Province January 2008

The Nijrab district's economy is primarily agricultural, growing products such as wheat, corn, red beans, walnuts, almonds, and pine nuts.

== Education ==
The district contains a number of primary and high schools. According to Nijrab's Director of Education Ghulam Mayudin, Nijrab has 44 schools. The Nijrab Department of Education is located in a rented office within the bazaar near the District Center. Nijrab suffers from a lack of qualified teachers, especially female teachers. Many schools in Nijrab have received new schools from several US and international organizations. The countries contributing the most to the funding of new schools in Nijrab are the US, Bangladesh (BRAC), and Japan.

Kapisa and Parwan PRT has recently (late 2008) approved funding for Kohi Girls School (Afghania), Shahed Nick mhomad (pachaghan), Mohammed Ayoob (Pachagan), khowaja roshnay walley (pachaghan), Engineer Habib Urahman (Kharj), Abdul Manan (Farakh Shah), and Abdul Salam (Pachagan). Qazi Abdul Jamil (Afghania) and Farakh Shah High School (Farakh Shah) were nearing completion as of December 2008.

All areas within Nijrab educate female students to include the Pashtun area of Afghania. There are several girls schools in Afghania. There was an incident in April 2008 in which the Taliban set fire to a girls school in the Afghania area. The villagers extinguished the fire and only one classroom was heavily damaged. Aside from that one act of arson, no attacks, threats, or acts of vandalism toward female schools had taken place during 2008. A large majority of villagers in Nijrab support the education of females and request new school buildings (half of the girls schools in Nijrab are without a building at all) with a perimeter wall for protection and privacy.
