= Alasay =

- Location in Afghanistan
- Coordinates: 34°53′45″N 69°43′15″E
- Country: Afghanistan
- Province: Kapisa Province
- District: Alasay District
- Time zone: + 4.30

The village of Alasay (Alah Say) is the center of Alasay District in Kapisa Province, Afghanistan. It is located on 34.8958°N 69.7208°E at 1672 m altitude.

The Battle of Alasay, codenamed Operation Dinner Out, was a military operation in Alasay which was carried out by French troops and the Afghan National Army (ANA) between 14 and 23 March 2009. It left one French soldier killed, as well as 35 to 70 Taliban insurgents.
