= Alasay District =

Alasay
- District
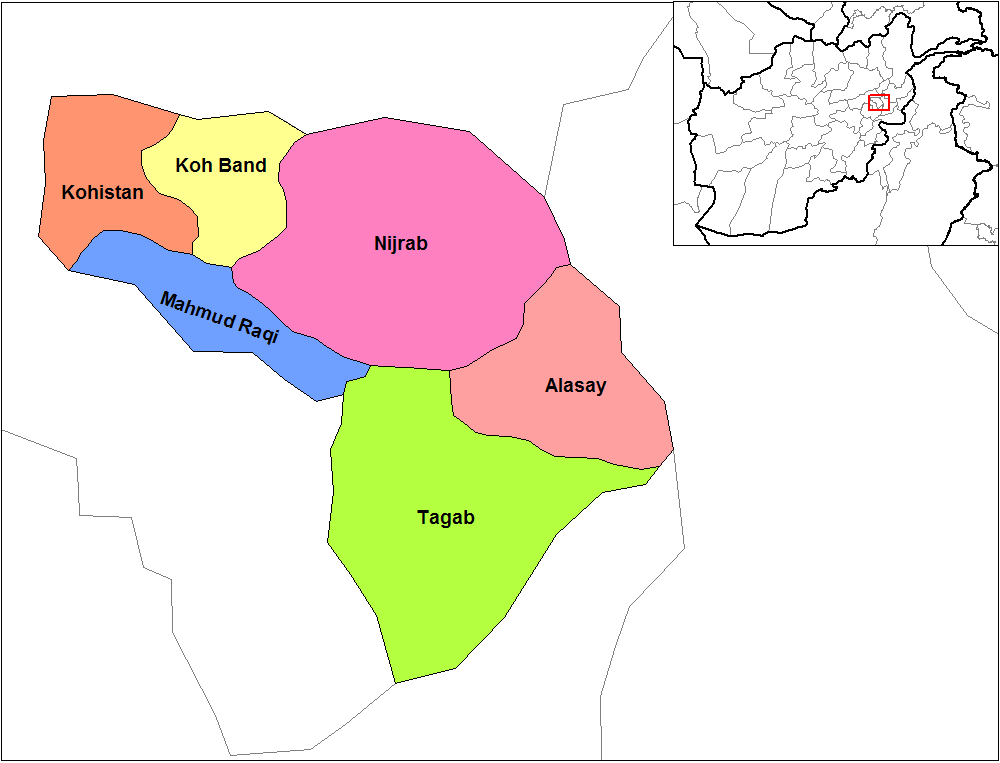

- Location within Afghanistan
- Country: Afghanistan
- Region: Kapisa Province
- Capital: Alasay

Population (2015)
  - Total: 38,642

The Alasay District (Alah Say) is situated in the eastern part of Kapisa Province, Afghanistan. It borders Tagab District, Kapisa to the south and east, Nijrab District to the north and Dawlat Shah District of Laghman Province to the east. The population is 38,642 (2015). The district center is Alasay, located in its southwestern part. Majority population is Pashayi, the rest being Pashtuns.

== Security and operations ==
From approximately 2006 until March 2009 the area was considered insurgent controlled. In March, however, French forces from GTIA Kapisa and Chasseurs Alpins 27e Battalion, along with a battalion of Afghan troops were able to successfully drive them out and establish two Afghan National Army bases in the valley.

== Geography ==
Most of the Alasay district is mountainous, and many of its villages are inaccessible by vehicles. The Alasay District contains three large valleys:

- Ishpi dara (most populated)
- Isken dara
- Alasay dara

There are approximately 70 villages in the district.

== Education ==
Alasay currently has 13 schools:

- 8 primary schools (7091 students, male and female)
- 2 high schools (294 students, male only)
- 1 madrassa (unknown number of students, male only)

Currently, the high schools and Madrassa in the district are boys' schools.

== Economy ==
The Alasay district is poor, with only a small amount of land usable for agriculture. Other sources of income include animal husbandry and labor.

== Health care ==
Currently, the Alasay district only contains four health facilities, located in the villages of Alasay, Ashpai, Koti, and Eskin.
