= Tagab, Kapisa Province =

Tagab
- Location in Afghanistan
- Coordinates: 34°51′20″N 69°38′58″E
- Country: Afghanistan
- Province: Kapisa Province
- District: Tagab District
- Elevation: 4,337 ft (1,322 m)

Population (2007)
  - Total: 6,628
- Time zone: UTC+4:30

Tagab is a village and the center of Tagab District (Kapisa Province), Afghanistan. It is located at 34.8556°N 69.6494°E at 1,322 m altitude. The population in the village area was calculated to be 6,628 in the year 2007.
