= Lima Aafshid =

Afghan poet (born 1996)

- Born: August 11, 1996 (age 30); Kohistan District, Kapisa Province, Afghanistan
- Education: Kabul University
- Occupations: Freelance reporter, commentator, poet

Lima Aafshid (Persian: لیمه آفشید) is an Afghan poet. Born in Kapisa Province on 11 August 1996, she studied journalism at Kabul University, working as a freelance reporter and commentator for more than five years after graduating. She was a founding member of Sher-e- daneshgah, a Kabul poetry association consisting mostly of middle-class students in their twenties. In 2021, she was included in the BBC's 100 Women list.
