= Kapisa Women's Center =

Women's center in Kapisa, Afghanistan

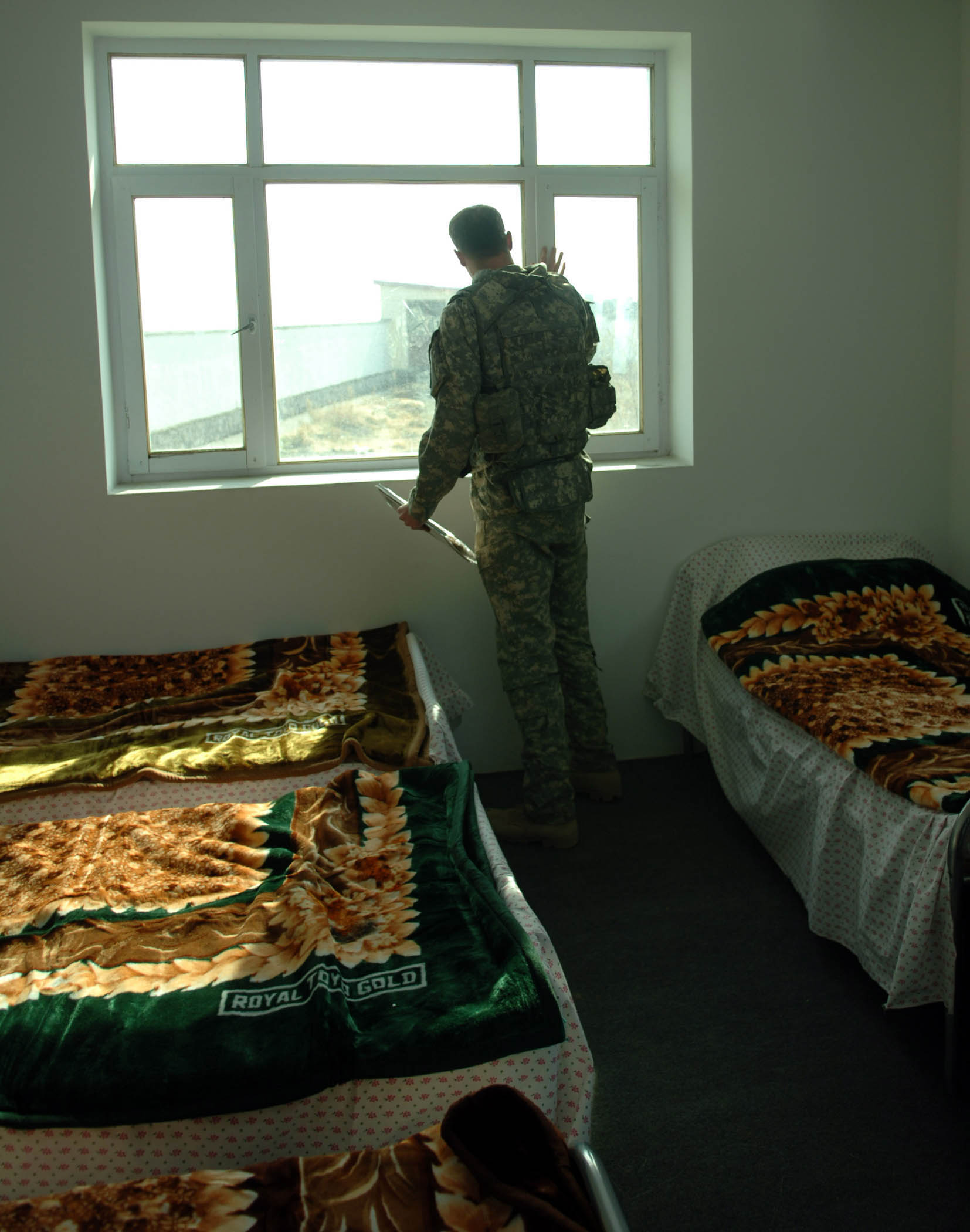
A women's center and women's shelter was opened in Kapisa, in December 2007.

The Kapisa Women's Center was opened in Mahmud Raqi, Kapisa Province, Afghanistan, in December 2007. It cost $450,000.

== Gallery ==
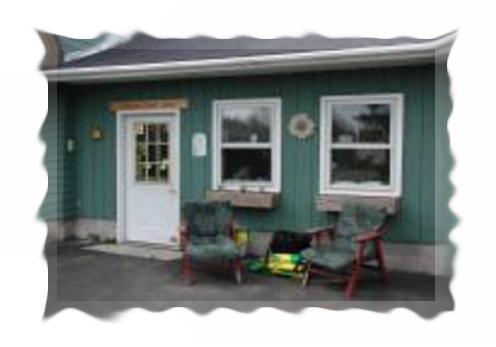
Kapisa women's shelter exterior

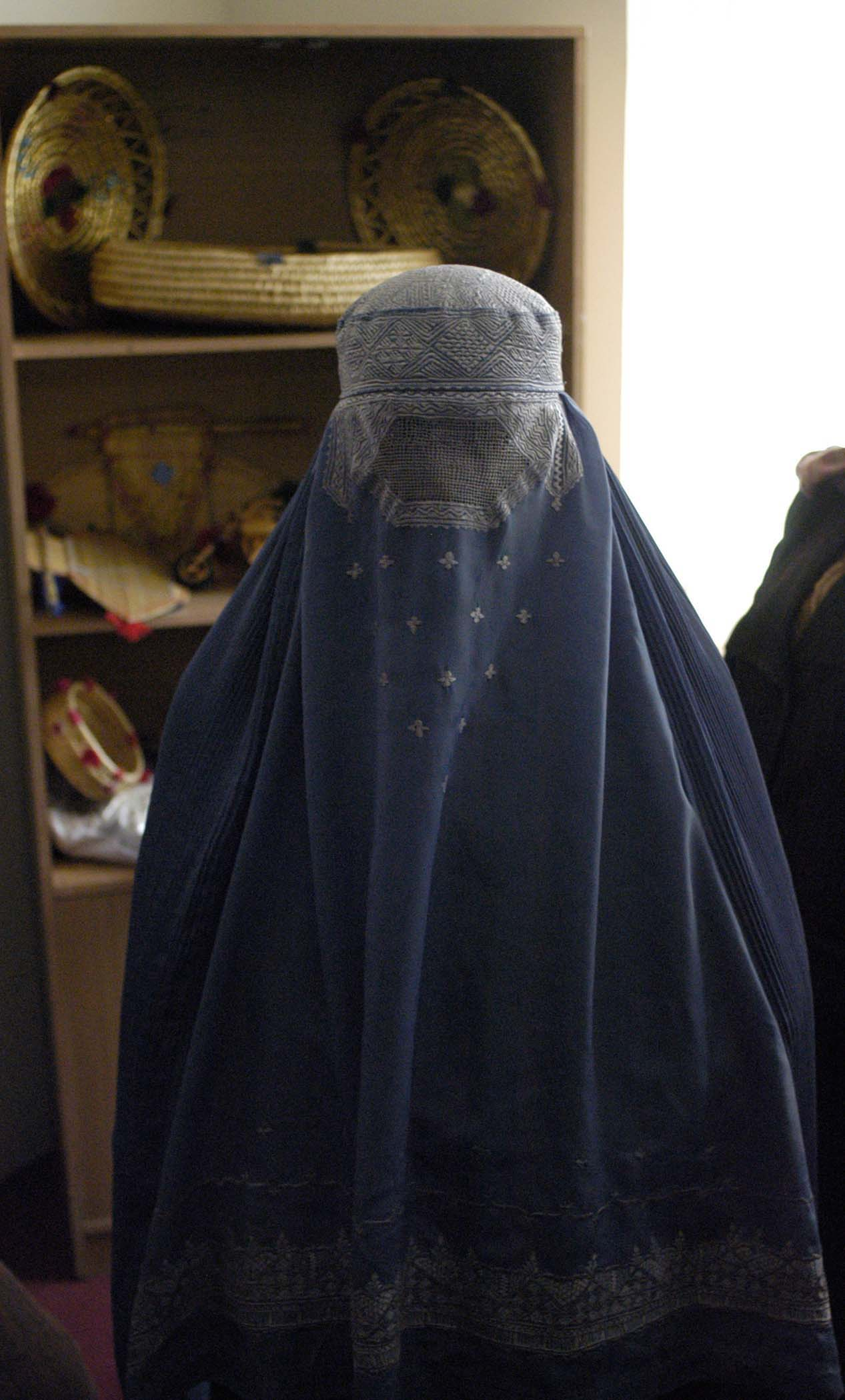
An Afghan woman sells handmade crafts during the opening of the Kapisa Women's Center

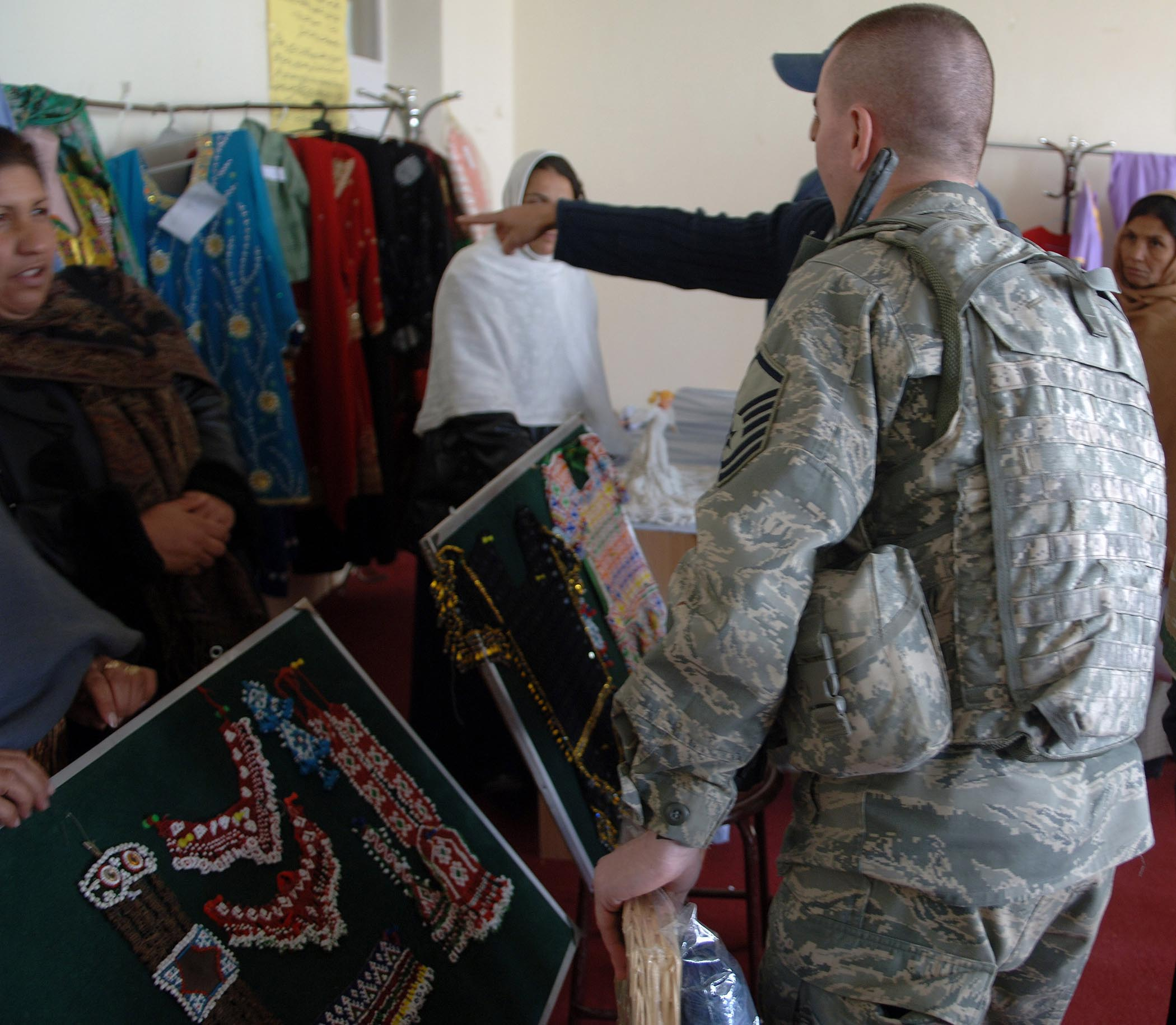
PRT GI examines handicrafts

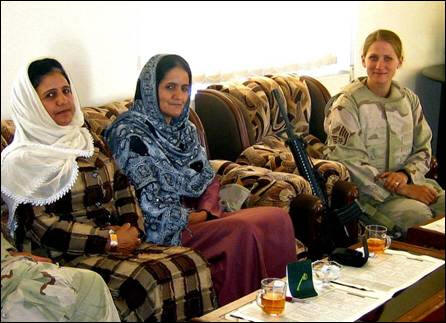
PRT visits the Kapisa Women's Center
