= Hesa Awal Kohistan District =

- District
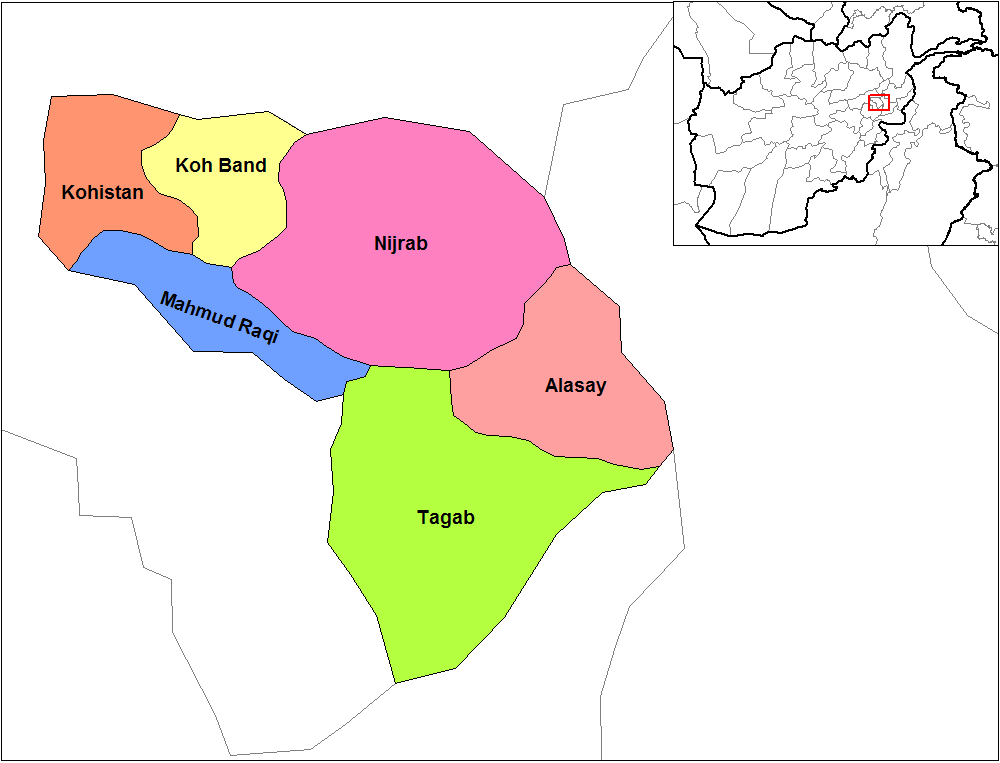
- Hesa Awal Kohistan District (in Orange)
- Country: Afghanistan
- Region: Kapisa Province
- Capital: Kohistan

Population (2006)
  - Total: 60,300

Hesa Awal Kohistan District is a new district, created from the bigger Kohistan District in Kapisa Province, Afghanistan. The district center is Kohistan. The population is 82,416 (2024), mostly Tajik.

== History ==
The Kohistani Tajiks were the most powerful and best organized groups that fought against the British occupation of Kabul in 1879 to 1880.

== See also ==
- Kohistan
