= Nijrab =

Nijrab نجراب
- Location in Afghanistan
- Coordinates: 34°58′39″N 69°34′27″E
- Country: Afghanistan
- Province: Kapisa Province
- District: Nijrab District
- Elevation: 5,292 ft (1,613 m)
- Time zone: UTC+4:30

Nijrāb (Pashto/Persian: نجراب) is a city with five valleys in Kapisa Province, Afghanistan. It is located at 34.9775°N 69.5742°E at 1,613 m altitude. There is a medical clinic, schools, and a radio station in the District. Nijrab is the most populous city of Kapisa province, and Nijrab District, with a population of 114,726 (2015), is also the most populous district of Kapisa.

Five valleys in Nijrab are:

- Kharej Dara خارج دره
- Dara-e Puta درۀ پته
- Dara-e Farukh Shah درۀ فرخ شاه
- Dara-e Kalan درۀ کلان
- Dara-e Ghaws درۀ غوث
