= Tagab, Orūzgān =

Place in Afghanistan

Tagab is a place in Shahidi Hassas District, Orūzgān Province, Afghanistan. It is located at 32°44′26″N 65°16′34″E.

== See also ==
- Orūzgān Province
