= Mahmud Raqi District =

District of Kapisa, Afghanistan

Mahmude Raqi محمود راقی
- District
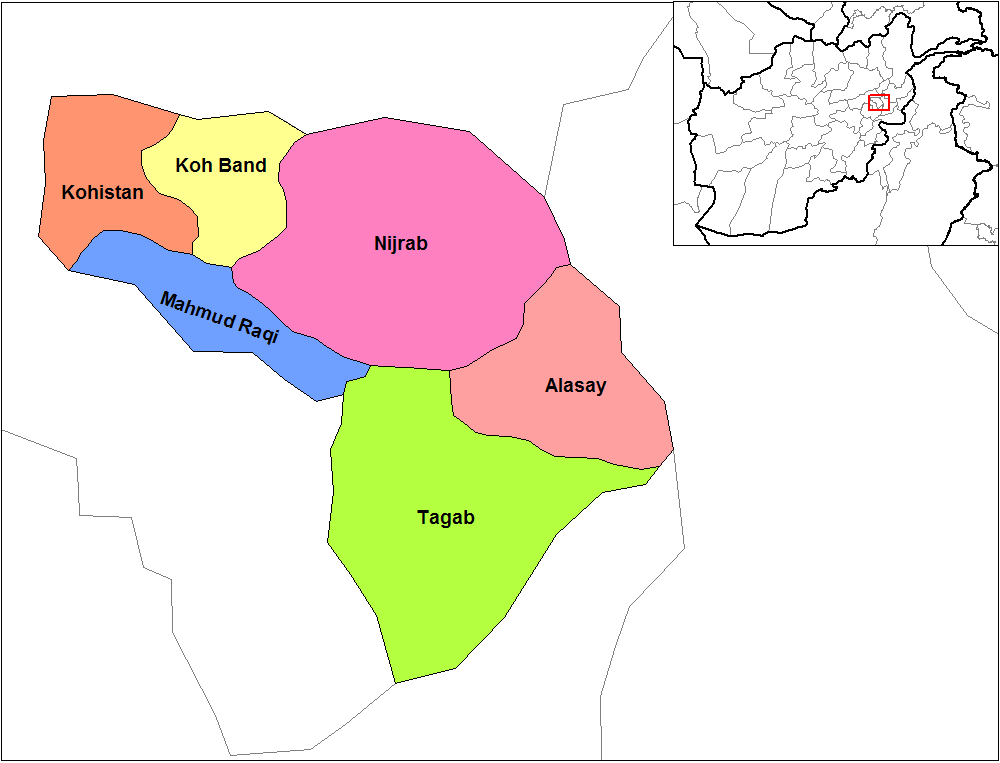
- Mahmude Raqi district (in blue)
- Country: Afghanistan
- Capital: Mahmude Raqi

Population (2006)
  - Total: 200,000

Mahmude Raqi District is located in the western part of Kapisa Province, Afghanistan. It borders with Parvan Province to the south; Nijrab District and the former Kohistan District to the north; and Tagab District to the southeast. The district center is the town of Mahmude Raqi, the provincial capital. As of the 2006 census, the district's population was 200,000.
