= Hesa Duwum Kohistan District =

- District
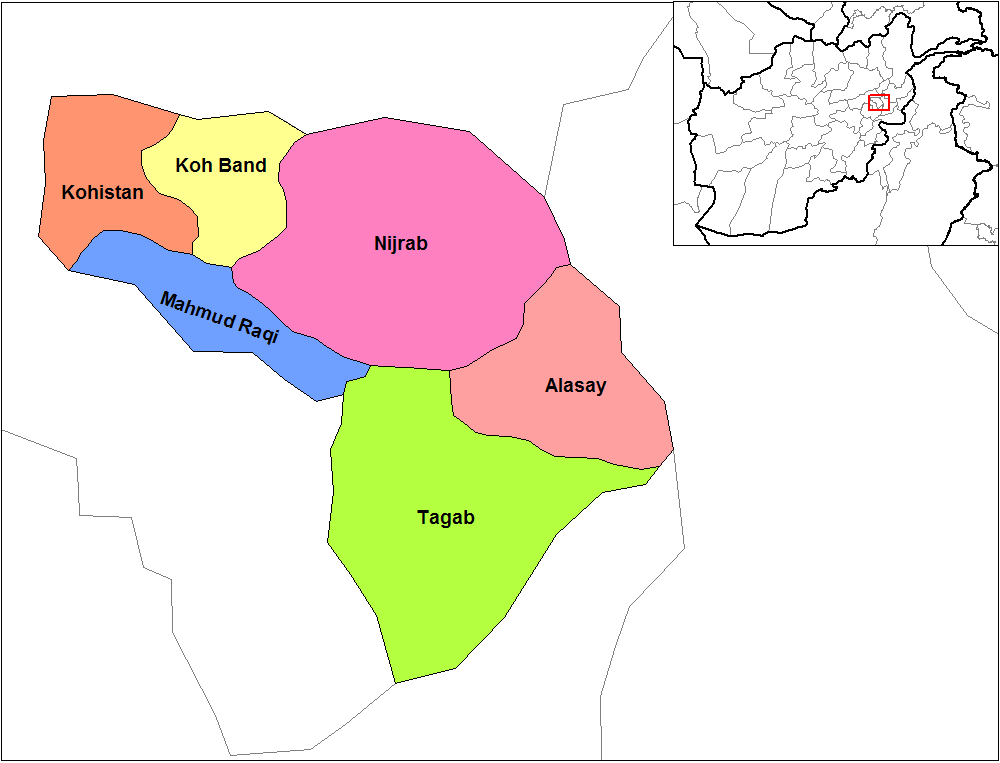
- Hesa Duwum Kohistan District (in Orange)
- Country: Afghanistan
- Region: Kapisa Province
- Capital: Kishiktan

Population (2006)
  - Total: 39,900

Hesa Duwum Kohistan District is a district in the southern part of Kapisa Province, Afghanistan. The center is the village of Kishiktan. The population is 39,900 (2006) and is mostly composed of Tajik. The district is famous for its sweet mulberries, grapes, apricots and pomegranates. Yearly, hundreds of visitors spend their weekends along the Kohistan river that flows into Surobi lake. During the war against USSR, Kohistani was one of the headquarters for Mujahidin. Kohistan is located at the crossroots with Parwan and Panjshir provinces. Jamal Aagha ist one another village of this District.

== Geography ==
Hesa Duwum Kohistan is a new district formed by the division of the Kohistan district.

== History ==
The Kohistani Tajiks were considered the best organized and powerful groups opposing the 1879–1880 British occupation of Kabul.
