= Tagab Robat =

- Location in Afghanistan
- Coordinates: 34°38′15″N 62°50′8″E
- Country: Afghanistan
- Province: Badghis Province
- Time zone: + 4.30

Tagab Robat is a village in Badghis Province in north western Afghanistan.
