= Rajapura (Kamboja) =

Capital of ancient Hindu Kamboja Kingdom

Rajapura or Rajapuram was the capital of the ancient Kamboja Kingdom mentioned in the Mahabharata. Karna led a war expedition against the Kamboja and some other tribes of the Uttarapatha a little time before the Kurukshetra War i.e. Karana Rajapuram gatva Kamboja Nirjitastvaya. The Chinese pilgrim Xuanzang who travelled to India in the 7th century refers to Hoshepulo(曷羅闍補羅, roughly hat-la-tsia-pu-la in 7th century Chinese) which has been identified as Rajapura of Sanskrit tradition by Watters and others. As Per Xuanzang Identification This Name Of Kamboja Capital Rajapura Has Been Identified Kapisa In Afghanistan

== See also ==
- Kambojas
- Mahajanapadas
- History of India
- History of Hinduism
