= Tagab District, Kapisa =

Coordinates: 34°47′50″N 69°40′45″E

- District
- Interactive map of Tagab District, Kapisa
- Country: Afghanistan
- Region: Kapisa Province

Population (2006)
  - Total: 71,700

The Tagab District (from Pashto تګاب ولسوالۍ, "lone stream") is situated in the eastern part of Kapisa Province, Afghanistan. It borders Parvan Province to the West, Mahmud Raqi and Nijrab districts to the North, Alasay District to the East and Kabul Province to the South-East. The population is 71,700 (2006) with Pashtun being the majority and the Pashai a minority. The district center is the village of "Tamir" (تعمیر) located in the western part of the district.

== Villages ==
Tagab district is 40 kms away from the Province center Mahmud Raqi. Tagab has 140 villages that are interwoven together in a relatively flat mountainous valley.

== ٍEducation ==
Although the majority of the districts in Kapisa province had government run schools, according to an estimate in 2007, 103 more schools were needed to fulfill the educational need of the province. Of the districts of Kapisa, Tagab and Alasay districts were the two districts with the fewest schools and students attending schools. Girls' schools, as of 2007, were non-existing.

== Economy ==
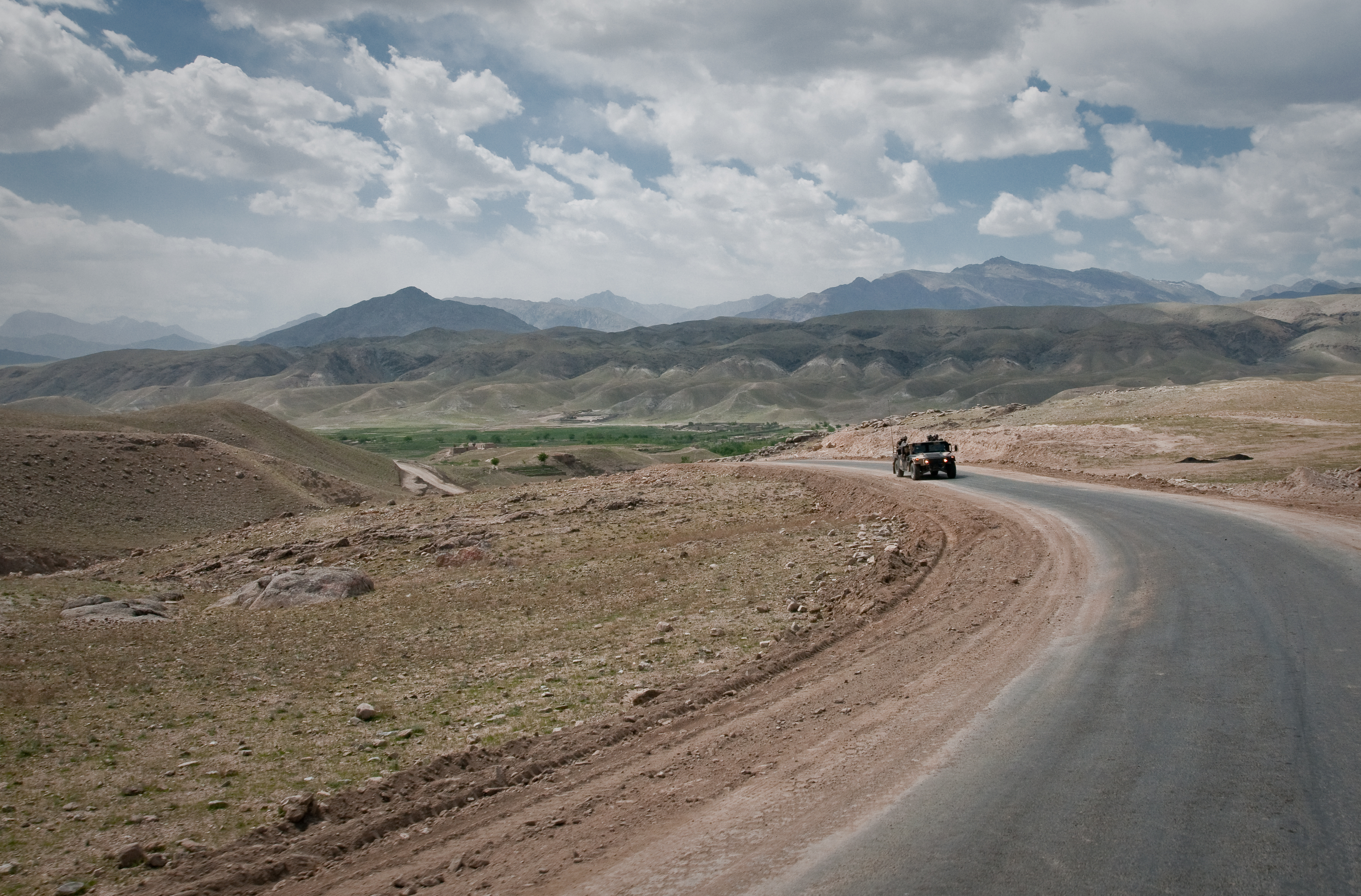
A humvee of the Afghan National Army traverses a solitary road through the Tagab Valley.

The main source of income is agriculture, with 90% of usable land under cultivation. The majority of the produce are fresh pomegranates, onions, apples, peaches, and dry fruit such as almonds and raisins. However, the poor state of roads throughout the district causes difficulty in taking the food outside of the local area. Animal husbandry is also common, especially sheep and goat herding.

Currently, plans are in the works to build a north–south road connecting to the Kabul-Jalalabad Road, which will allow goods to move from Tagab District to the northern city of Mazar-e-Sharif, and from there into Uzbekistan.

Health care and educational facilities are limited and are in need of further improvement.

== Security and Violence ==
On 15 November 2009 Taliban militants fired rockets on a bazaar in Tagab district where French Forces were meeting with Tribal elders. killing 10 Afghan civilians and wounding 28. All of the casualties were brought to nearby FOB Kutschbach where French and Army Special Forces medics evacuated the wounded. Days later the Afghan civilians blamed the US in the Tagab Bazaar instead of the Taliban. "If the US and French soldiers weren't here, the Taliban wouldn't fire rockets".

In response to this attack, in late November 2009 the French ISAF forces launched a new offensive against the forces of the Taliban and Hizb-e Islami in Operation Avalon. The 700 plus forces from the 3rd Marine Infantry Regiment and 2nd Foreign Infantry Regiment attempted to clear the area where a new road was being built to help supply NATO forces in Afghanistan.
