= Kapisa Province =

Province of Afghanistan

Kapisa کاپیسا
- Province
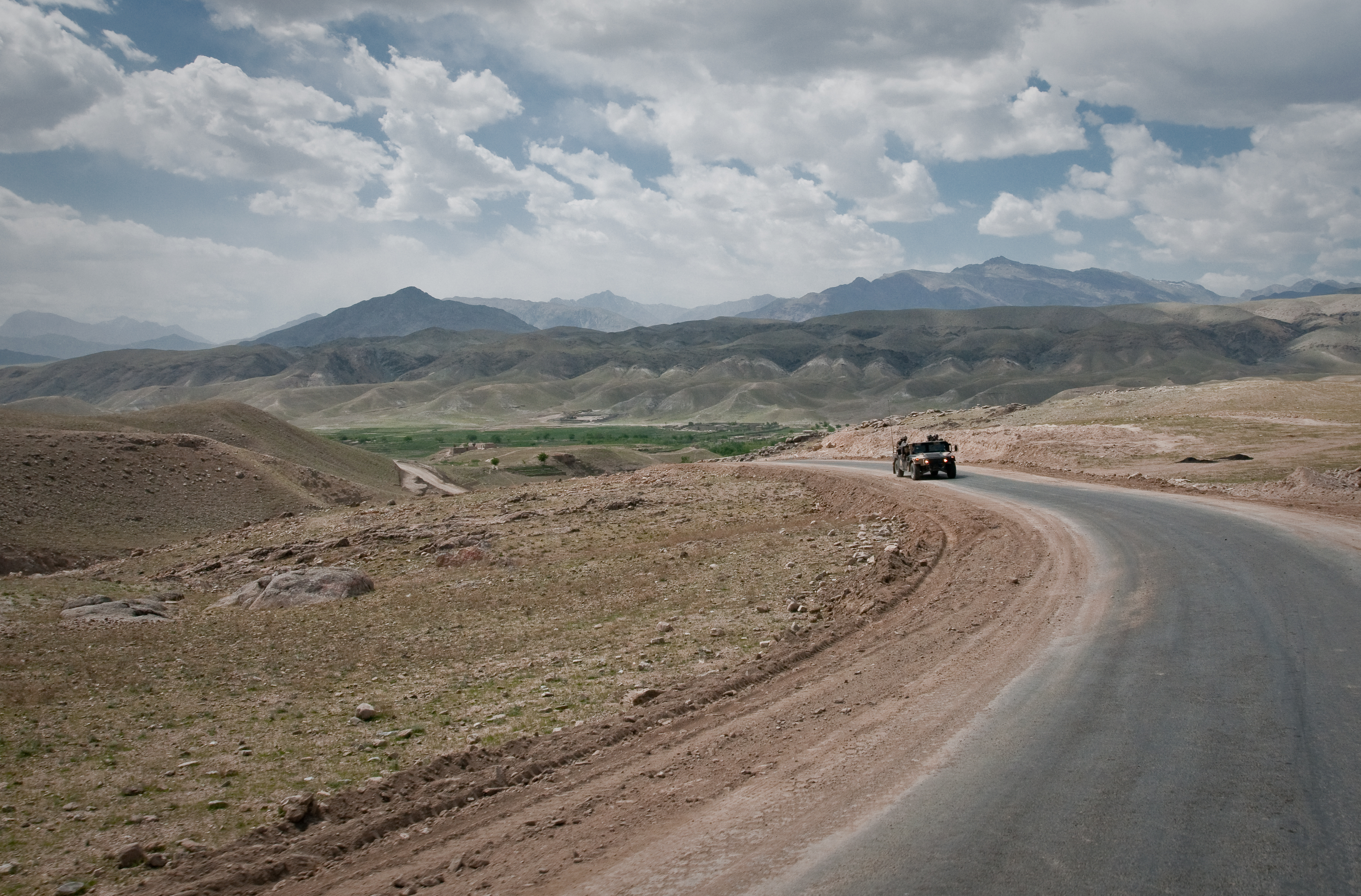
- A road in the Tagab District of Kapisa Province

- Map of Afghanistan with Kapisa highlighted
- Coordinates (Capital): 35.0°N 69.7°E
- Country: Afghanistan
- Capital: Mahmud-i-Raqi

Government
  - Governor: Mohammadullah Idris
  - Deputy Governor: Maulvi Asadullah Sanan

Area
  - Total: 1,842.1 km^{2} (711.2 sq mi)

Population (2024)
  - Total: 523,201
  - Density: 284.02/km^{2} (735.62/sq mi)
- Time zone: UTC+4:30 (Afghanistan Time)
- Postal code: 12xx
- ISO 3166 code: AF-KAP
- Main languages: Dari; Pashto

Kapisa (Note: English: /kəˈpiːsə, kəpiːˈsɑː/ kə-PEE-sə, kə-pee-SAH; Pashto: کاپيسا, romanized: Kāpisā, pronounced [kɑpiˈsɑ]; Dari: کاپيسا, romanized: Kāpīsā, cyrillized: Кописо, pronounced [kʰɑːpʰiːˈsɑː]) is the smallest of the 34 provinces of Afghanistan, located in the northeastern part of the country. It has an estimated population of 523,201 people and an area of 1,842 km^{2} (711 sq mi), making it the most densely populated province apart from Kabul Province. It borders Panjshir Province to the north, Laghman Province to the east, Kabul Province to the south and Parwan Province to the west. Mahmud-i-Raqi is the provincial capital, while the most populous city and district of Kapisa is Nijrab.

== History ==
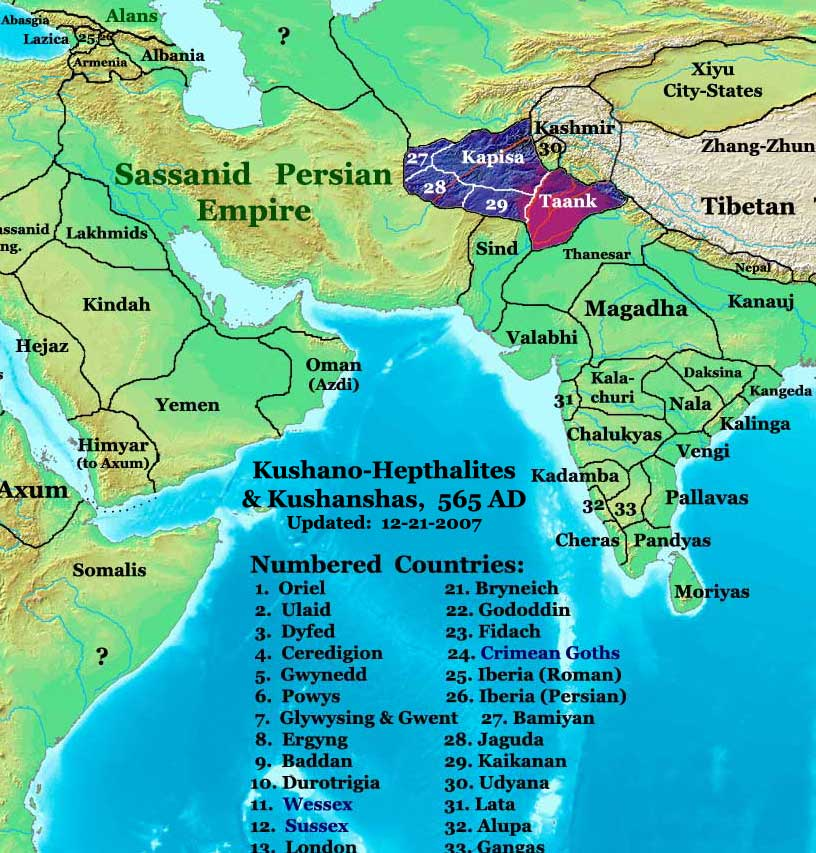
Asia in AD 565, showing the Shahi kingdoms and their neighbors.

The earliest references to Kapisa appear in the writings of the fifth century BCE Indian scholar Pāṇini. Pāṇini refers to the city of Kapiśi, a city of the Kapisa kingdom, modern Bagram. Pāṇini also refers to Kapiśayana, a famous wine from Kapisa. The city of Kapiśi also appeared as Kaviśiye on Graeco-Indian coins of Apollodotus I and Eucratides.

Archeological discoveries in 1939 confirmed that the city of Kapisa was an emporium for Kapiśayana wine, bringing to light numerous glass flasks, fish-shaped wine jars, and drinking cups typical of the wine trade of the era. The grapes (Kapiśayani Draksha) and wine (Kapiśayani Madhu) of the area are referred to in several works of ancient Indian literature. The epic Mahabharata also mentions the common practice of slavery in the city.

Based on the account of the Chinese pilgrim Xuanzang, who visited in AD 644, it seems that in later times Kapisa was part of a kingdom ruled by a kshatriya king holding sway over ten neighboring states, including Lampaka, Nagarahara, Gandhara, and Banu. Xuanzang notes the Shen breed of horses from the area, and also notes the production of many types of cereals and fruits, as well as a scented root called Yu-kin.

The 7th-century Chinese pilgrim Xuanzang mentions Rajouri (Rajapura) in the context of Kashmir, but he does not associate Rajouri with the Kambojas or describe Rajouri as the capital of a major transregional kingdom. This absence is noteworthy because Xuanzang elsewhere explicitly records figures and polities preserved in epic and early historical tradition, including Mahabharata Magadha King Jarasandha with Rajagriha, And Xuanzang Identifies Bhagadatta, and the rulers of Kamarupa

By contrast, Xuanzang describes Kapisa as a prominent political and commercial center south of the Hindu Kush, a region widely identified in Sanskrit, Buddhist, Greek, and Chinese sources with Kamboja.On this basis, some scholars argue that identifying the Kamboja capital Rājapura with Rajouri relies largely on toponymic similarity, whereas the association with Kapisa being Rajapura (Capital Of Kambojas) corresponds more closely with Xuanzang’s geographical descriptions, Mahabharata , Buddhist and the broader comparative source tradition.

The Mahābhārata, particularly the Droṇa Parva, refers to Rājapura as the capital of the Kamboja kingdom, portraying Kamboja as an organized polity engaged in sustained military activity alongside Bāhlikas, Pahlavas, Saka and Yavanas. Some modern scholarship has identified this Rājapura with present-day Rajouri, largely on the basis of name similarity.

However, this identification has been questioned, as Rajouri lacks independent textual, archaeological, Greek, or Chinese evidence linking it to the Kambojas. By contrast, multiple Sanskrit, Buddhist, Greco-Roman, and Chinese sources equate Kamboja with Kapisa (Kapisha/Ki-pin), a major political and commercial center south of the Hindu Kush described in detail by the 7th-century pilgrim Xuanzang. Scholars such as Sylvian Lévi, Moti Chandra, and K. C. Mishra therefore argue that Kapisa better fits the geographical, economic, and historical profile of the Kamboja capital Rajapura described in the epic Mahabharata.

=== Greco-Bactrian Kingdom and the Mauryan Empire ===
The Kapisa province territory fell to the Maurya Empire, which was led by Chandragupta Maurya. The Mauryas promoted both Buddhism and Hinduism to the region which was entirely Hindu for all its history till then, and were planning to capture more territory of Central Asia when they decimated local Greco-Bactrian forces and the chief general of Alexander Seleucus. Seleucus is said to have reached a peace treaty with Chandragupta by giving his daughter in marriage, control of the territory south of the Hindu Kush to the Mauryas and 500 elephants.

Locations of two inscription sites in present-day Afghanistan.

Alexander took these away from the Aryans and established settlements of his own, but lasted only a decade before Seleucus Nicator gave them to Sandrocottus (Chandragupta), upon terms of intermarriage and of receiving in exchange 500 elephants.

— Strabo, 64 BCE – 24 CE

Some time after, as he was going to war with the generals of Alexander, a wild elephant of great bulk presented itself before him of its own accord, and, as if tamed down to gentleness, took him on its back, and became his guide in the war, and conspicuous in fields of battle. Sandrocottus, having thus acquired a throne, was in possession of India, when Seleucus was laying the foundations of his future greatness; who, after making a league with him, and settling his affairs in the east, proceeded to join in the war against Antigonus. As soon as the forces, therefore, of all the confederates were united, a battle was fought, in which Antigonus was slain, and his son Demetrius put to flight.

— Junianus Justinus

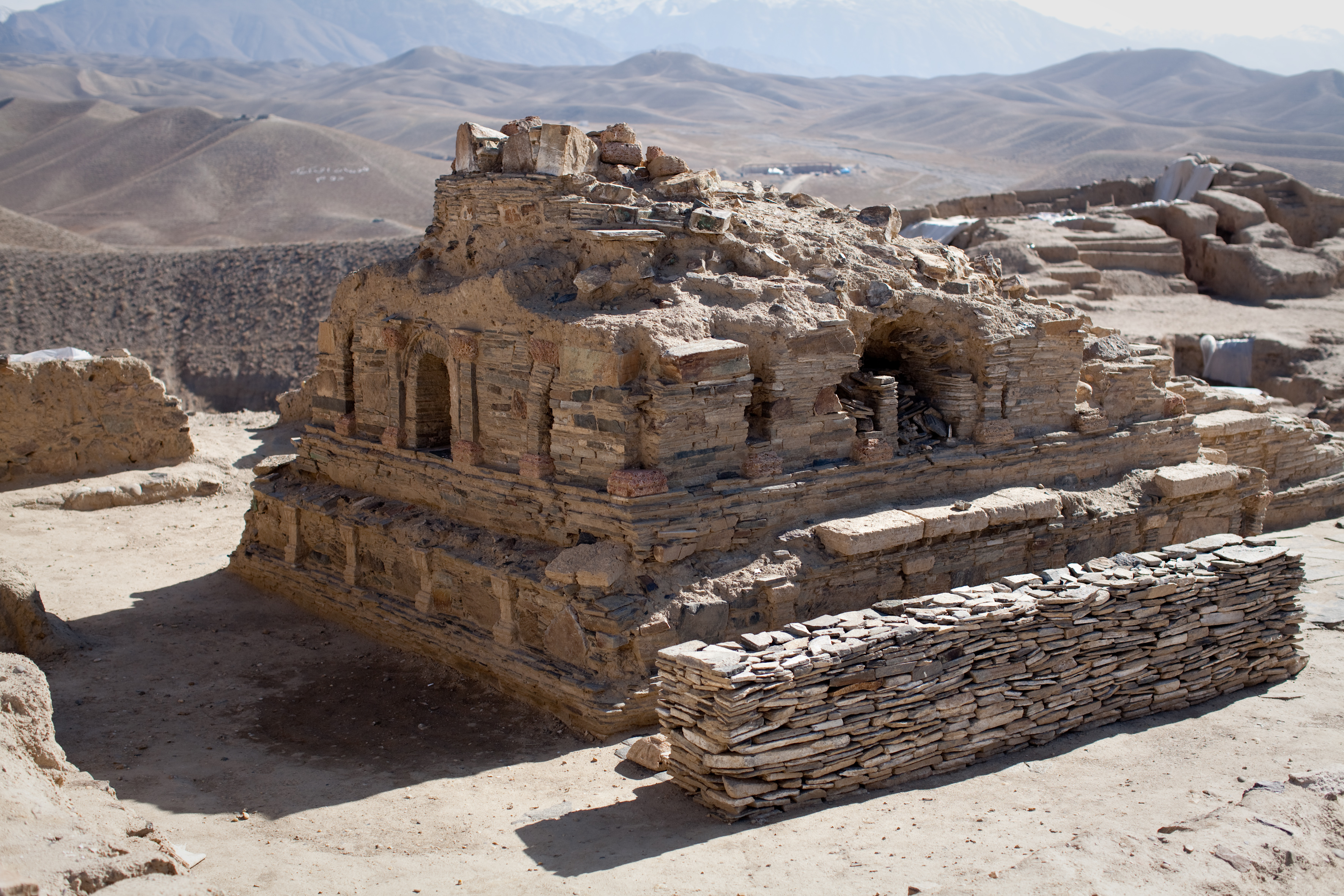
Newly excavated Buddhist stupa at Mes Aynak in Logar Province of Afghanistan. Similar stupas have been discovered in neighboring Ghazni Province, including in the northern Samangan Province.

Having consolidated power in the northwest, Chandragupta pushed east towards the Nanda Empire. Afghanistan's significant ancient tangible and intangible Buddhist heritage is recorded through wide-ranging archeological finds, including religious and artistic remnants. Buddhist doctrines are reported to have even reached as far as Balkh during the life of the Buddha (563 BCE to 483 BCE), as recorded by Xuanzang.

In this context, a legend recorded by Xuanzang refers to the first two lay disciples of Buddha, Trapusa and Bhallika responsible for introducing Buddhism in that country. Originally these two were merchants of the kingdom of Balhika, as the name Bhalluka or Bhallika probably suggests the association of one with that country. They had gone to India for trade and had happened to be at Bodhgaya when the Buddha had just attained enlightenment.

=== Recent history ===
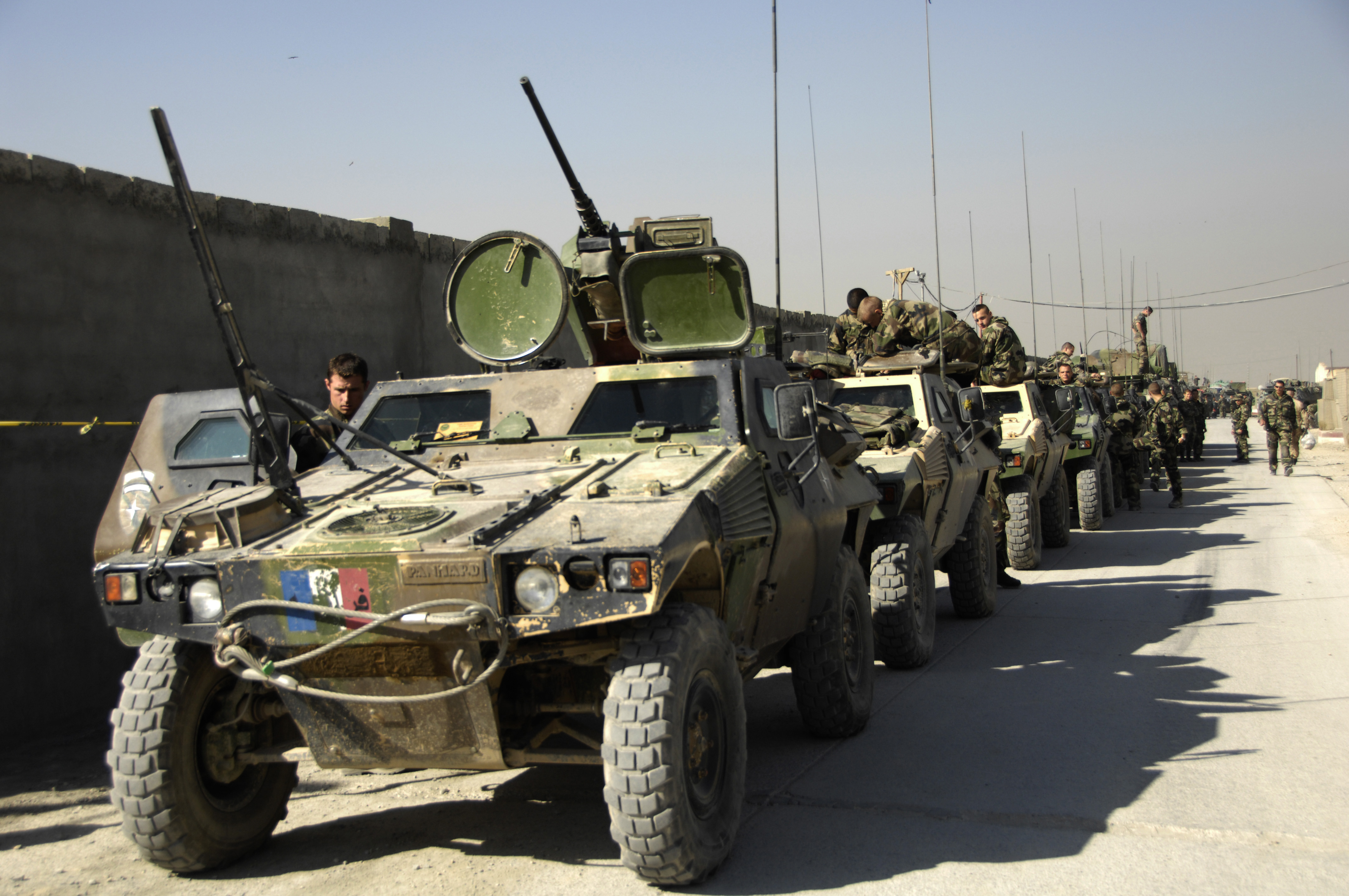
French army soldiers prepare their vehicles for a convoy prior to departing camp for Operation Eagle, October 2008

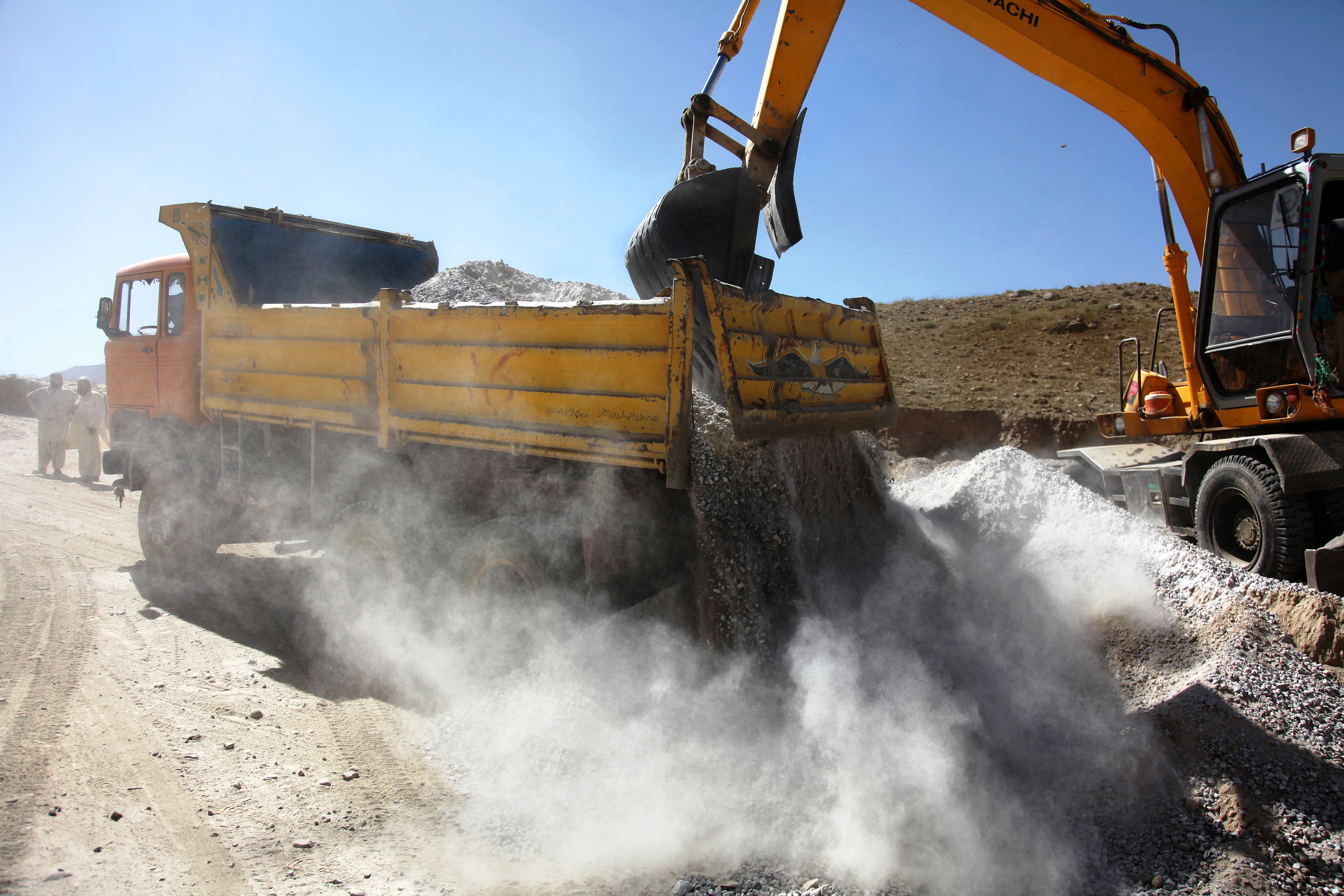
Afghan construction workers, work on a road construction project in Mahmood Rahqi.

The modern province of Kapisa was established on 30 April 1964, when Afghanistan was reorganised into 29 provinces, replacing the previous system of fewer but larger administrative units. It comprised the eastern portion of the former Large Governorate of the North (Dari: حکومت کلان سمت شمالی, romanized: Ḥukūmat-i Kalān-i Samt-i Shamālī), the territory of which largely corresponds to the present-day provinces of Kapisa and Panjshir. In 1975, with the publication of the official yearbook of the Republic of Afghanistan, it was reported that Kapisa was downgraded from a province to a large district (Pashto: لوی ولسوالۍ, romanized: Lōy Wōleswālī) within the province of Parwan the past year.

Just like the rest of Afghanistan, many historical sites in Kapisa have been looted by smugglers and then sold abroad. During 2009 and 2010 twenty-seven relics were discovered by the National Security forces; these included ancient relics belonging to 2 BC and 4 BC mostly from Kohistan district.

Before 2012, French forces were complemented by U.S. forces through Provincial Reconstruction Teams and Human Terrain Teams. The province was served by the Kapisa PRT, located at Forward Operating Base Morales-Frazier in Nijrab District. The PRT conducted counterinsurgency and stability operations in the province for more than six years, working with leaders of Kapisa at the provincial and district level, to bolster the capacity and credibility of the Government of the Islamic Republic of Afghanistan. The PRT participated in key leader engagements, scouting areas for new projects, and performing quality checks and site visits on existing projects. The key focus was on building roads, bridges, construction of schools, and also improvements to power capabilities on existing infrastructure. Composed of U.S. Air Force, Army, State Department, and USAID subject matter experts and mentors, the team sought to work closely with key leaders to facilitate development. The vision was to foster a stable and secure environment ready for transition to the Afghan government.

By August 2008 the French mission was facing serious challenges. A shocking ambush in Surobi, the district of Kabul Province they were responsible for patrolling, killed 10 French troops. Some accounts suggest part of the reason why they were ambushed was because the Italian government was paying bribes to the local Taliban commander; when the French took over, the bribes stopped and the Taliban attacked. However, this accusation has been dismissed by Rome, Paris, and NATO. The Surobi massacre spurred a larger debate in France about the war. After taking over from the U.S., which exercised partial control over the province for several years beforehand, the French continued to follow the U.S.-led approach of sending troops through an area to kill or chase away militants. Like the American military, the French never developed a solid plan for consolidating their victories and building on successes – which left many areas of Kapisa in a constant tug-of-war between the French and the insurgents.

In early 2009, French forces embarked on a significant campaign which aimed to retake an eastern Alasay District that the Taliban has controlled for the previous year. Alasay district is a strategic goldmine: it lies along a primary infiltration route into and out of Pakistan, it provides easy access to Kabul in an easily defensible primary valley (there are two other valleys in Alasay District), and it is mostly populated by the ethnic minority the Pashai and some Nuristani. In a French-led NATO force initiated, the operation was a success initially, due to reaching out to locals beforehand, they retook the entire valley with a single casualty over a single day of fighting. Almost immediately, the Afghans of the valley welcomed the French, and things seemed to be looking up. However, they didn't stay. Much as in previous efforts to "sweep" the province, the French were dragged into other tasks, like protecting the main highway that travels the province from north to south through the volatile Tagab Valley. As a result, Alasay fell back to Taliban later that year and the security situation in the province deteriorated. It was that same tug-of-war all over again, with the residents of Alasay left frustrated and less safe than ever before. As 2009 progressed, bigger and bigger chunks of the province came under the sway of the insurgency, leading the provincial capital being more or less under curfew from the militants. By 2010, the French had stopped liaising with their Afghan Army counterparts, and the Provincial Reconstruction Team had ceased most of its operations.

In late 2009, the province saw an influx of ISAF forces as the French elevated their presence from a Battalion-strength Task Force under Task Force Korrigan (Groupement tactique interarmes de Kapisa) to a Brigade-strength Task Force under Task Force Lafayette (Brigade La Fayette). At the same time, the Kapisa PRT, formerly the Parwan-Kapisa PRT, relocated from Bagram Airbase to FOB Morales-Frazier, focusing exclusively on operations in the Kapisa Province for the following three years.

The French military's growing frustration with their inability to make progress resulted in tensions with the Afghans they were meant to support. These tensions stemmed in large part from the challenge of the overall ISAF missions to build support for the legitimate government of Afghanistan with the realities of the dysfunctional local government within Kapisa. The provincial governor, Ghulam Qawis Abubaker, was widely viewed as corrupt and was accused by contractors and district officials of funding insurgent elements in order to keep Kapisa unstable enough to keep PRT dollars coming into the province at higher levels, which in turn would widen the corruption problem. In 2010, the governor himself would be removed and charged by ISAF with corruption, though the Karzai administration would later refuse to prosecute the case. U.S. forces, including the PRT, also believed the Governor himself was responsible for the killing of the Panjsher PRT Commander in May 2009 (believing the Kapisa PRT commander to be the true objective) and of escalating attacks in northern Kapsia in Fall 2009 aimed at both PRT and French convoys as the counterinsurgency effort during this period shifted to Tagab and Alasay.

For much of the period leading up to this, the French forces, ISAF, and the U.S. PRT differed in strategies for dealing with the problem and whom to deal with among the Afghan population, eventually seeking out district-level shura approaches to fund projects at the community level and alleviate the concerns villagers had with existing projects and bypassing the provincial leadership. This strategy continued to gain support across the coalition elements as provincial officials were being arrested for having ties to the insurgency.

When a bombing in central district of Nijrab killed four French soldiers in June 2012, within France the bombing resonated deeply: while President Hollande had before indicated that he might keep some French troops in the country to help with the training mission, he later announced a full withdrawal by July. France being the fifth largest contributor to NATO's ISAF coalition, with nearly 3,300 soldiers, began its troop withdrawal from Afghanistan in July and completed it by the end of the 2012. Kapisa transitioned to Afghan government control in third of the five-phase transfers. Withdrawing French troops by the end of 2012 had been one of President Hollande's election pledges. The date meant that French forces left the country two years before the main scheduled NATO withdrawal.

The early French withdrawal had led some to speculate that Kapisa will become a security vacuum just outside Kabul. This would be no small matter: the "ring of steel" that surrounds Afghanistan's capital has been broken so many times that few have faith in the capital's safety anymore. Several of those early attacks, before the influx of French troops, were planned and supported out of the Tagab Valley. The French presence there had reduced the ability of militants in Kapisa to launch attacks into Kabul. When the French leave, the U.S. would not have the troops to fill in the gap, leaving a big opportunity for militants north of Kabul to strike back. Most of the province population believe that the long-term presence of foreign forces in Afghanistan can only serve to perpetuate the war cycle and the departure of the French will weaken the Taliban stance. Over 60 French soldiers have been killed in Kapisa since 2008, with hundreds more injured severely. With the help of Afghan National Army, French forces conducted operations to repel the insurgents and Afghan forces were able to gain a foothold in Kapisa valleys. They oversaw the formation of the 3rd Brigade of the 201st Afghan corps that is now deployed in Kapisa and of the Afghan police who now are solely responsible for providing the province's security.

A transition ceremony for Kapisa Province was held July 4, 2012, formalizing the symbolic transfer of responsibility of the province from ISAF to Afghan authorities as part of the transition process in the province launched May 13, 2012; the Afghan security forces began to take the lead since autumn 2011. However the insurgency still remained active in Tagab and Alasay districts.

Some clashes have been reported in the province since the 2021 Taliban takeover of Afghanistan.

== Geography ==
Kapisa province is located 80 km (50 mi) northeast of Kabul. It is bordered from the north by Panjshir Province, from the east by Laghman Province, from the south by Kabul province and from the south west by Parwan province. The province covers an area of 1,842 km^{2} (711 sq mi); that makes it the smallest province in all of Afghanistan. Kapisa Province's terrain is a mixture of high peaks, mountainous river valleys, and shallow central plains; the highest points of the province are in the east, on the borders with Panjsher and Laghman Provinces.

== Government and politics ==
=== Local governance ===
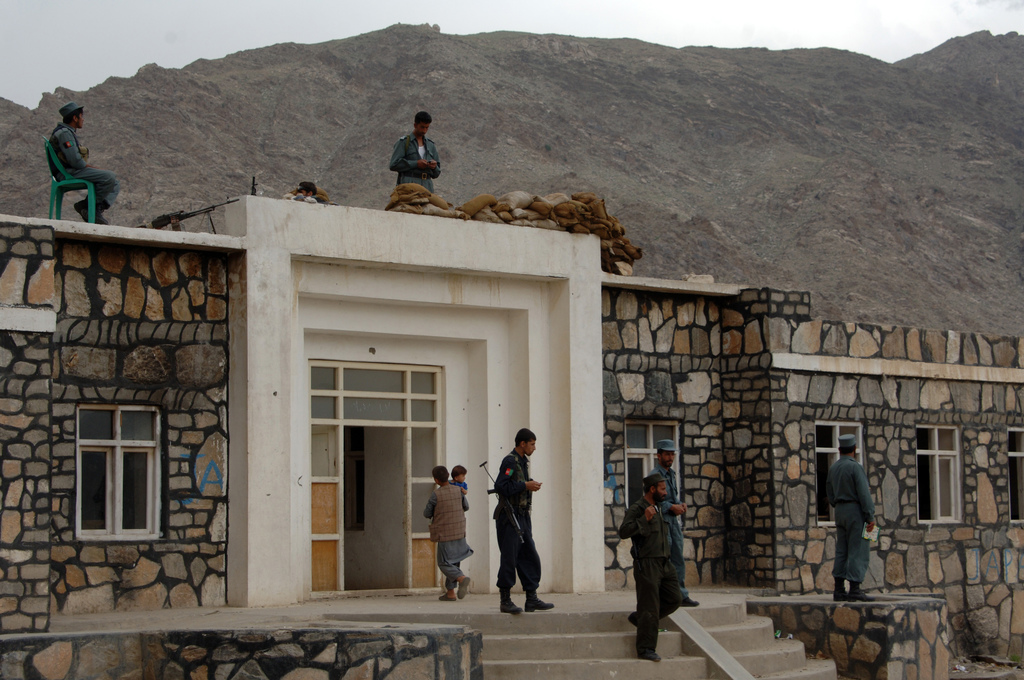
An elementary school in Kapisa with ANP police helping with preparation for a medical civic action program.

The districts of Kohistan, Mahmud Raqi, and Kohband districts, all of which are Jamiat-i Islami and almost all Tajik, were targeted zones of interest for the insurgency. Because they are close enough to Kabul, the militants count attacks there as attacks in Kabul. Whilst the districts of Tagab, Alasay and Nijrab are Hizb-i Islami Gulbuddin supporters and are a mixture of Pashtuns, Tajiks and Pashai. The importance of Kapisa comes as it lies along the approach to the Panjshir River valley and most of the major Jamiat figures have managed to secure wealth and power in the post-2001 Afghanistan, while most of the HiG figures have not. As a result, most of the violence in the area is not actually "Taliban" as we would normally consider it, but HiG fighters (and in a lot of cases petty thugs) calling themselves Taliban.

In July 2007 Abdul Sattar Murad, was removed from office by President Hamid Karzai, and his replacement was Ghulam Qawis Abubaker. The ostensible reason for Murad's removal was 'ineffective governance', but it was widely believed by press sources that Murad was removed because of critical comments he made in a Newsweek interview regarding the central government's ineffectiveness in remote areas of the province.

Insurgent activity in the province increased in 2006 and 2007. Southern areas of the province, in particular the Tagab district, have been the site of repeated clashes between U.S. and Afghan forces and insurgent groups.

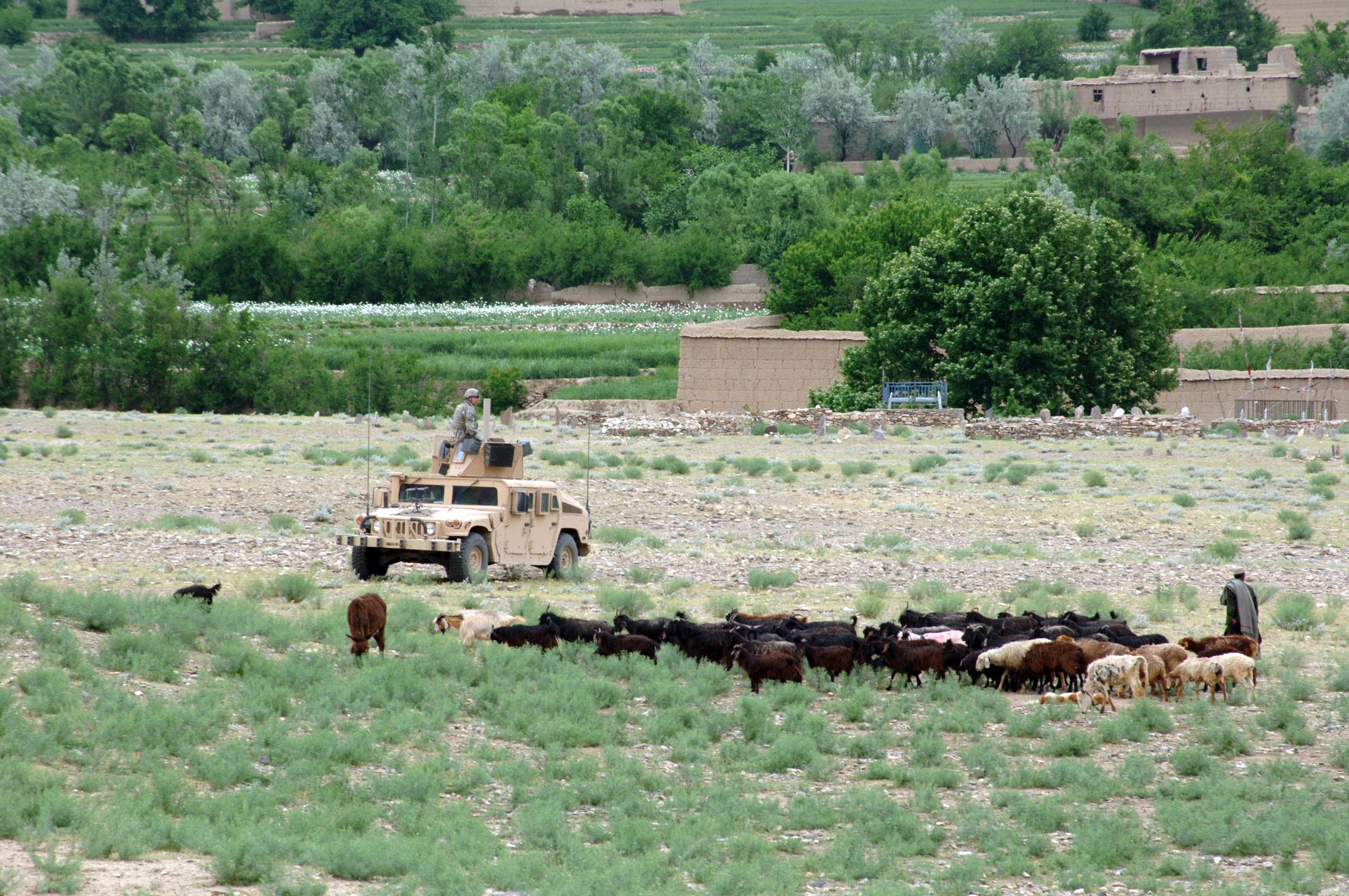
The district of Tagab in the Kapisa Province of Afghanistan.

On January 19, 2009, coalition military forces led a raid near the village of Inzeri in the Tagab district of Kapisa. While coalition forces claimed at least 15 insurgents were killed (including a local Taliban commander), local villagers claimed that many of those killed were actually civilians. The raid was strongly criticized by Afghan president Hamid Karzai, who stated that such raids undermine the national government. The villagers were paid a total of $40,000 in condolence payments, and received an apology for any civilian deaths.

On 17 November 2009, Taliban insurgents fired rockets on a bazaar in Tagab district where French forces were meeting with tribal elders, killing 10 Afghan civilians and wounding 28.

Kapisa is seen as an important piece of property in the war against insurgency in the country, the province has been called "the gateway to Kabul", it is viewed as an important area even as small as it is. A densely packed, multiethnic enclave in steep valleys surrounded by tall mountains. It has unique ethnicities like the Pashai and Parachi, unique Pashtuns like the Safi, and many Tajik dominated areas.

Kapisa has been the site of several failed attempts at counterinsurgency since 2005. There have been at least two special operations sweeps through the area, and at least three major Coalition efforts to clear and hold territory. The province of Kapisa is an area that constitutes an invisible boundary between a zone to the west and north where the population is Tajik, and generally hostile to the Taliban, and the steep-sided valleys to the south-east dominated by the Pashtun and Pashai people, where there is a lot of rebel activity. This ethnic split lies at the heart of the Kapisa insurrection. Mahmud-i-Raqi, capital of Kapisa Province is Tajik dominated, where there are more fighters who fought with Massoud than there are Taliban sympathizers. Their staunch anti-Taliban stance is not the norm in this province – especially in the Tagab or Alasay districts. The Province a complex political and ethnic arena, where there is a lot of ambiguity towards foreign troops. Kapisa represents an allegory of the fractured and elusive Afghanistan.

Kapisa is allocated four seats in the Wolesi Jirga, Afghanistan's lower house of Parliament, one of which is reserved for female candidates. In the 2010 Wolesi Jirga contest 45,271 votes were cast in the province. Only one incumbent candidate, Mohammad Iqbal Safai was re-elected, coming in second place in the contest. Mirdad Khan Nijrabi came in first place in the contest, Agha Jan come in third, and Tahira Mujadidi, the winning female candidate, came in fourth.

=== Administrative divisions ===
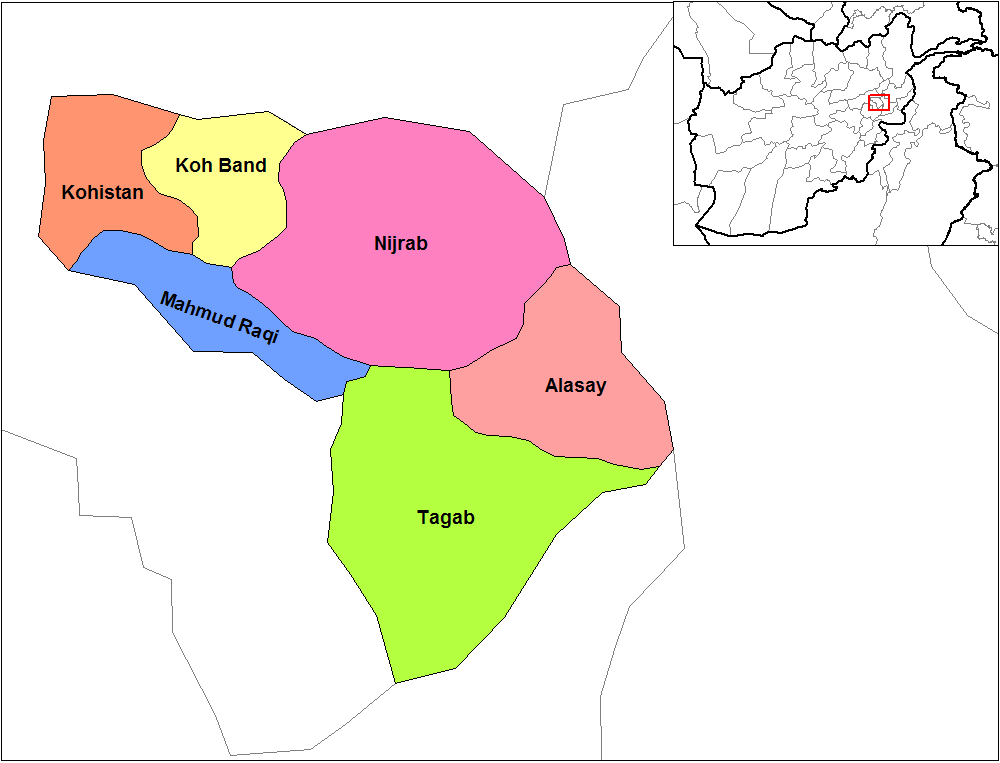
Map of the districts of Kapisa as of January 2004, prior to the redrawing of provincial and district boundaries later that year

Districts of Kapisa Province
| District | District Center | Population (2022) | Area | Pop. density (2022) | Notes |
|---|---|---|---|---|---|
| Alasay | | 42,780 | 327 | 131 | 60% Pashayi in the upper half of the district and 40% Pashtuns in its lower half. |
| Hesa Awal Kohistan | | 76,925 | 88 | 872 | Tajiks. Created in 2005 within Kohistan District |
| Hesa Duwum Kohistan | | 50,885 | 38 | 1,346 | Tajiks. Created in 2005 within Kohistan District |
| Koh Band | | 26,572 | 163 | 163 | Pashayi |
| Mahmud Raqi | Mahmud-i-Raqi | 72,716 | 173 | 422 | 70% Tajiks and 30% Pashtuns |
| Nijrab | Nijrab | 127,013 | 594 | 214 | 80% Tajiks, 14% Pashtuns and 6% Pashayi |
| Tagab | Tagab | 91,407 | 497 | 184 | 90% Pashtuns and 10% Pashayi |
| Kapisa | | 488,298 | 1,908 | 256 | 57.4% Tajiks, 28.5% Pashtuns, 14.1% Pashayi. |

== Economy ==
Saffron harvesting ceremony in Kapisa Province

Agriculture is the largest portion of the economy. One particular crop, saffron, has been introduced as a major trade commodity in the province.

Once a week, a trade day (called a Mela) occurs. The concept of the mela is ancient, and translates to "party" in Persian, as the event is as much a social event as a trade day.

Kapisa is primarily a farming province. Agriculture, livestock, and trade and services account for the majority of commercial activity. Agriculture is a significant source of income for 62% of households. However, commerce and services provide income to 32 percent of rural households, while non-farm-related labor provides income to 35 percent of rural households. Cotton, sesame, tobacco, confection, honey, karakul skin, and sugar sweets appear to be the most common industrial goods produced in this area.

Despite the fact that the number of villages engaged in handcraft production is more than five times that of villages engaged in industries, overall production remains low. Carpets, pottery, and jewelry are three handicrafts that stand out. In the province, 96% of households have access to irrigated land, while 7% of rural households have access to rain-fed land. Wheat, maize, and barley are the most important field crops. Poultry, cattle, oxen, sheep, and goats are the most frequent livestock.

== Demographics ==
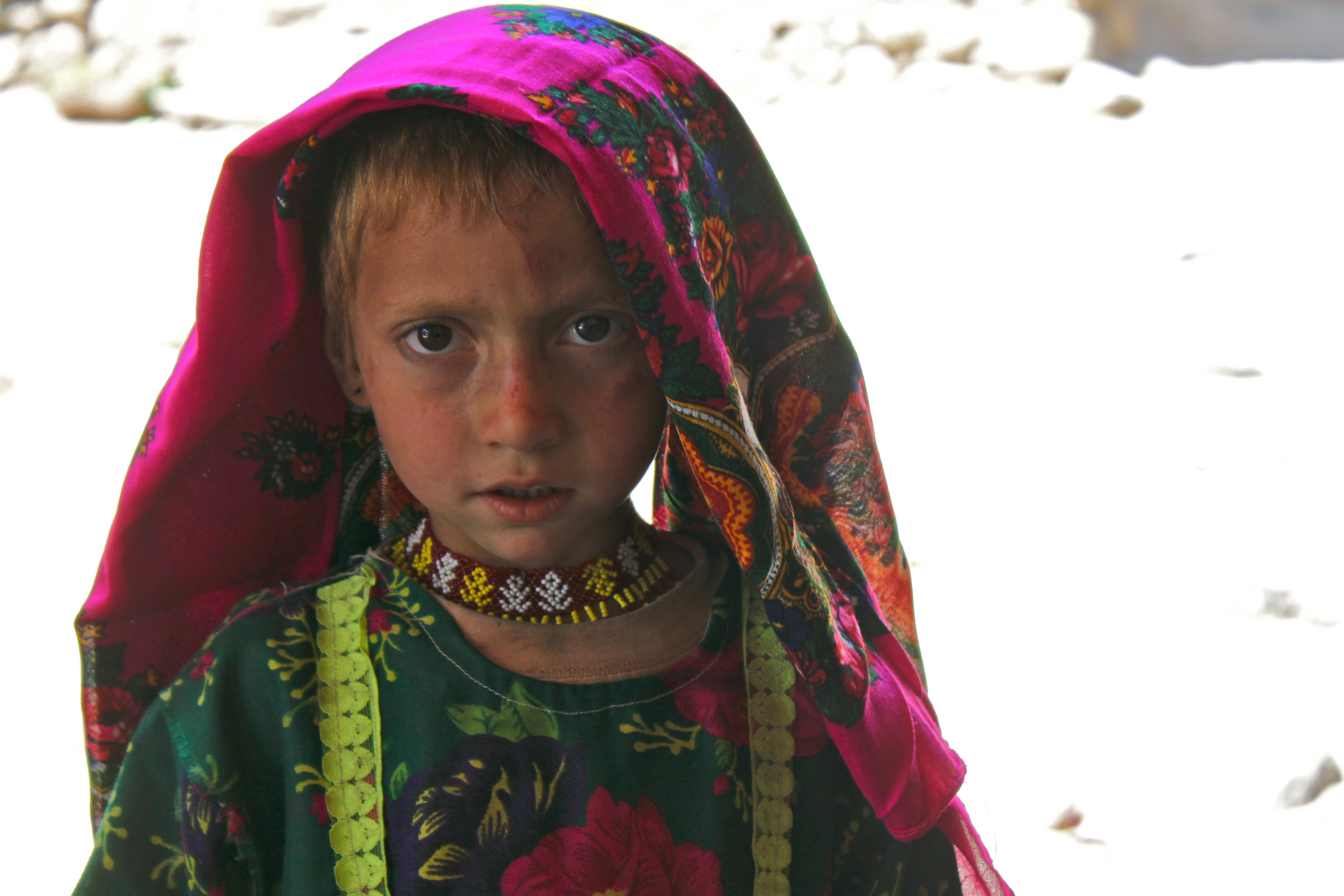
A young Pashai girl wearing distinctively colored and patterned clothing

=== Population ===
As of 2021, the population of the province is around 495,028 people.

=== Ethnicity, languages and religion ===
It is believed that the majority of the population in Kapisa are Tajiks, followed by a smaller number of Pashtuns and Pashayi.

Estimated ethnolinguistic and -religious composition
| Ethnicity | Tajik/ Farsiwan | Pashtun | Pashayi | Nuristani | Others | Sources |
| Period | Tajik/ Farsiwan | Pashtun | Pashayi | Nuristani | Others | Sources |

| 2004–2021 (Islamic Republic) | 30 – 49% | 27 – 37% | 17 – 20% | ∅ | ∅ |
| 2020 EU | 1st | 2nd | – | 3rd | – |
| 2018 UN | 42% | 37% | 20% | – | – |
| 2017 CSSF (Note: Demographic information is based on data from 2017.) | majority | ∅ | – | ∅ | ∅ (Note: incl. Hazara.) |
| 2015 CP | 30% | 27% | 17% | – | – |
| 2015 NPS | ∅ | ∅ (Note: incl. Ghilzai and Safi.) | ∅ | ∅ | – |
| 2011 PRT | 45% | 27% (Note: excl. Kochi.) | 17% | – | – |
| 2011 USA | 30% | 27% | 17% | ∅ | – |
| 2009 MRRD | 49% | 30% (Note: excl. Kochi.) | 17% | – | – |

Legend:
- ∅: Ethnicity mentioned in source but not quantified
- –: Ethnicity not mentioned specifically
- Source abbreviations: Empirical sources: –, Government sources: CP – Colombo Plan, EU – European Union Agency for Asylum, MRRD – Ministry of Rural Rehabilitation and Development, PRT – Provincial Reconstruction Team of the United States government, UN – United Nations Assistance Mission in Afghanistan, Editorial sources: CSSF – Center for the Scientific Study of Families, NPS – Naval Postgraduate School, USA – United States Army

=== Education ===
Kapisa is home to Al-Beroni University, named after the Islamic scholar Al-Biruni who was from this region. The University offers programs in Agriculture, Engineering, Islamic Studies, Law, Medicine and Literature and is located in Kohistan district, the university was built by Ahmad Shah Massoud.

The overall literacy rate (6+ years of age) fell from 39% in 2005 to 31% in 2011. The overall net enrolment rate (6–13 years of age) fell from 60% in 2005 to 55% in 2011.

In Kapisa Province, the general literacy rate is 39 percent; however, although 53 percent of men are literate, only 23% of women are. 60 percent of youngsters aged six to thirteen are enrolled in school. There were 112,544 pupils enrolled in the 181 elementary, intermediate, and high schools in 2008. Boys made for 66% of students, while boys' schools accounted for 51% of all schools. In the schools, there were 3,657 instructors, with 12 percent of them being female. With one university and a teacher training college, the province also provides a number of higher education options.

=== Health ===
The percentage of households with clean drinking water fell from 27% in 2005 to 15% in 2011. The percentage of births attended to by a skilled birth attendant fell from 12% in 2005 to 7% in 2011.

In 2008, the Kapisa Province has 24 health clinics and two hospitals with a total capacity of 110 beds. According to data from 2008, the Ministry of Health employs 34 doctors and 154 other health professionals in the province. There are 72 pharmacies in the province. The majority of villages do not have a permanent health worker. Nearly half of the population must travel more than 10 kilometers to reach the nearest health center.

== Culture ==
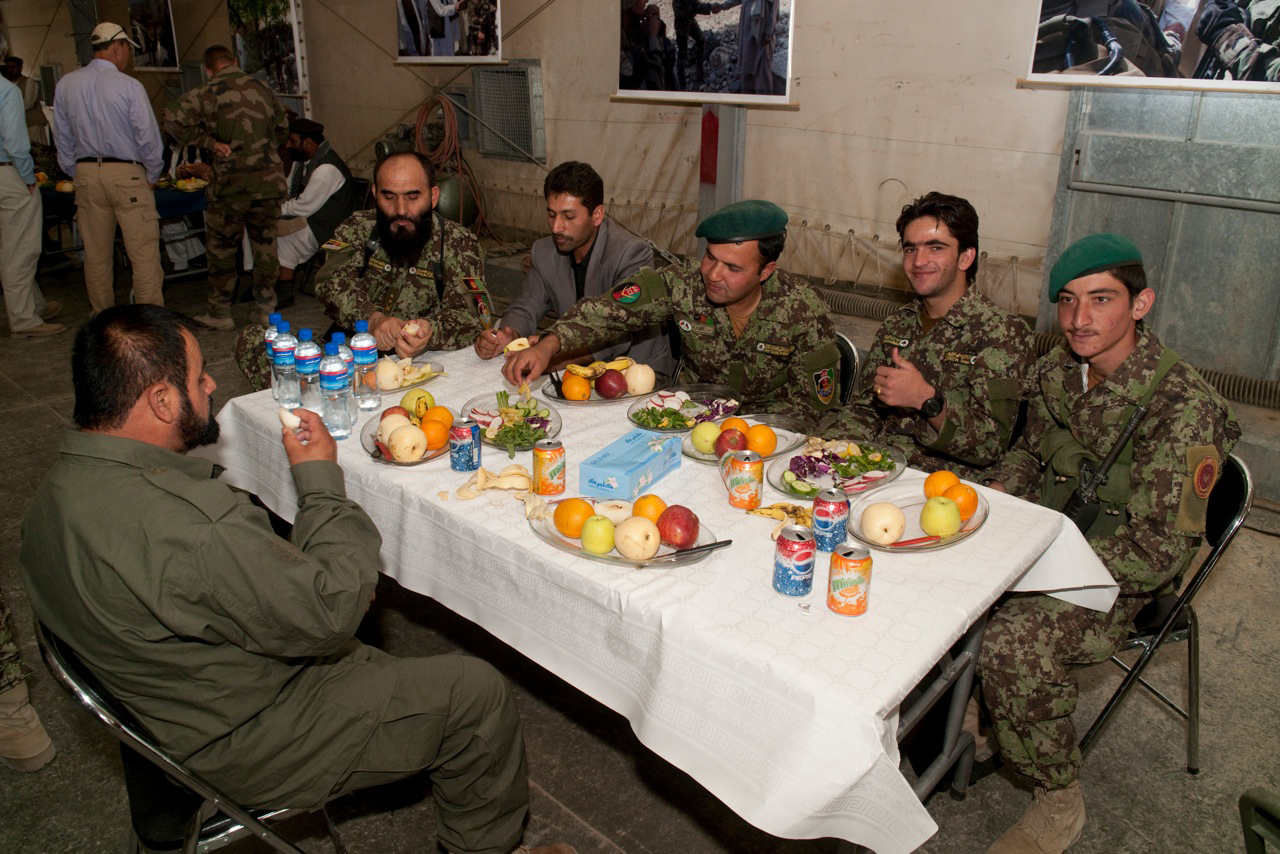
Police officials and government leaders from Kapisa eating a traditional Afghan lunchtime meal

=== Sport ===
The province is represented in Afghan domestic cricket tournaments by the Kapisa Province cricket team.

== Notable people ==
- Mir Masjidi Khan
- Baktash Siawash (born 1983), politician
- Lima Aafshid
- Massouda Jalal

== See also ==
- Provinces of Afghanistan
- Alexandria of the Caucasus
- Kapisa Women's Center
