= Lagman =

Lagman may refer to:

- A lawspeaker
- Lagman (surname)
- Lagemann (surname)
- Lagmann Godredsson
  - Lagmann mac Gofraid (fl. early eleventh century), King of the Isles
  - Lǫgmaðr Guðrøðarson (fl. late eleventh century), King of the Isles
- Laghman (food), a spicy Central Asia noodle soup
- Forward Operating Base Lagman, a former American military base in Afghanistan

== See also ==
- Laghman (disambiguation)
