= Laghmani =

Laghmani or Loghmani (Persian: لقمانی; adjective form of the toponym Laghman) is a Persian and Tunisian habitational surname. Notable people with the surname include:

- Abdullah Laghmani (1960s–2009), Afghan security deputy chief
- Ahmed Laghmani (1923–2015), Tunisian poet
- Ali Loghmani (born 1962), Iranian cinematographer
- Isa Khan Laghmani (born 1987), Afghan soldier
