= Baad Pakh District =

Baad Pakh is a district in Laghman Province, Afghanistan.
