= 拉麵 =

拉麵, 拉面, or 拉麺 (Hanyu Pinyin: lāmiàn; Japanese pronunciation: rāmen; lit. 'pulled noodles') may refer to:

- Lamian, handmade or hand-pulled Chinese noodles, and the dish made from these noodles
- Ramen, a Japanese dish of noodles served in broth
- Ramyeon, a Korean dish of noodles
