= Burj Azizi =

Megatall skyscraper under construction in Dubai, United Arab Emirates

- برج عزيزي
- 3D rendering of Burj Azizi
- Former names: Entisar Tower

General information
- Status: Under construction
- Type: Residential, hotel, retail, observation, restaurant
- Location: Sheikh Zayed Road, Dubai, United Arab Emirates
- Coordinates: 25.224056°N 55.282611°E
- Construction started: 29 August 2016; 10 years ago (restarted construction in August 21, 2024)
- Estimated completion: 2030
- Owner: Azizi Developments

Height
- Architectural: 725 m (2,379 ft)
- Roof: 665 m (2,182 ft)
- Top floor: 627 m (2,057 ft)
- Observatory: 649 m (2,129 ft)

Technical details
- Floor count: 133
- Floor area: 279,200 m^{2} (3,005,000 sq ft)
- Lifts/elevators: 44

Design and construction
- Architect: AE7
- Developer: Azizi Developments
- Other designers: Qualiconsult International, DSGN, Eversendai Corporation, International Foundations Group
- Main contractor: Gardinia Contracting

Burj Azizi (Arabic: برج عزيزي) is an under-construction skyscraper and a centrepiece of Sheikh Zayed Road, in Dubai, United Arab Emirates. It will have 133 floors for various purposes. Burj Azizi could be the world's second-tallest building once completed, if it reaches its proposed height of 725 meters (2,379 feet); this is 103 metres (338 ft) shorter than the Burj Khalifa, located 2 kilometres (1.2 mi) away.

== History ==
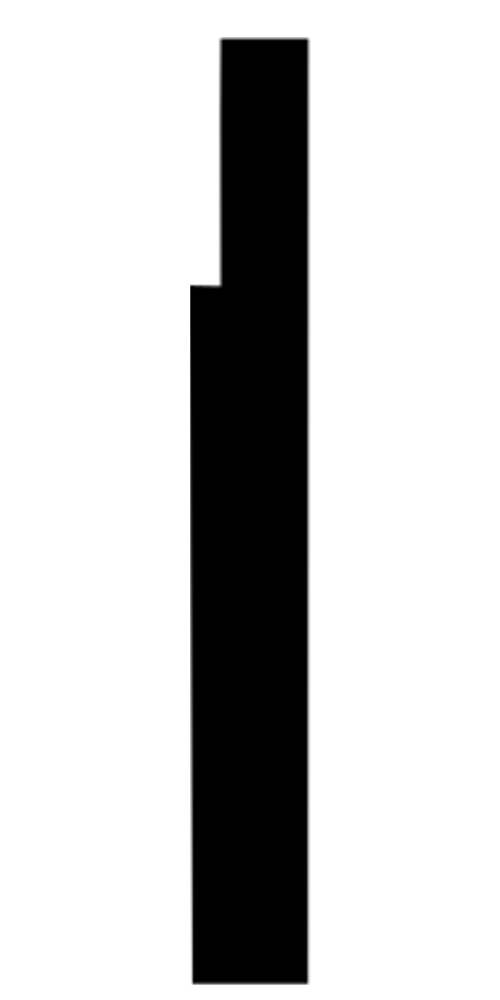
Entisar Tower's logo

In 2012, Meydan Group announced the Entisar Tower as a 570 m (1,870 ft) tower and 122-story skyscraper. Groundbreaking occurred in 2016. Construction was halted in 2017 due to Dubai's civic building proposals department issuing a stop-work order due to a payment dispute with the developers, with the ensuing property bust making the projects abandoned.

In 2018, Azizi Developments acquired the long-stalled Entisar Tower. In January 2024, the tower was rebranded, redesigned and renamed as Burj Azizi, and construction restarted in 2025. The building is named after Mirwais Azizi, the chairman of Azizi Bank and Afghanistan's richest man. As of May 2026, works were progressing on the tower's raft foundation and its nine-basement-level automated car park building, with around 750 workers on site daily.

== Elevators ==
KONE is expected to supply 59 elevators and 15 escalators for the Burj Azizi skyscraper in Dubai. The longest planned elevator journey will be 631.5 metres. The elevators will have a maximum speed of 10 metres per second, while the building is planned to reach a height of 725 metres. According to Guinness World Records, the elevator in Shanghai Tower travels 578.5 metres, which means that the planned elevator in Burj Azizi would exceed this distance by 53 metres. KONE states that the weight of traditional steel ropes is one of the factors that limits how far an elevator can travel, so systems for tall buildings use lightweight UltraRope composite ropes and other solutions designed to reduce the weight of cables and safety equipment. According to the company, these technologies can reduce the weight of the system by about three tonnes over a travel distance of 300 metres. KONE is also involved in the Jeddah Tower project in Saudi Arabia, where an elevator journey of 660 metres is planned.

== See also ==
- Burj Binghatti Jacob & Co Residences
- Jeddah Tower
- Dubai Meydan City
- List of tallest buildings in Dubai
- List of tallest buildings in the United Arab Emirates
- List of tallest buildings
