= Lo mein =

Chinese egg noodle dish

- A plate of Cantonese-style lo mein
- Course: Main course
- Place of origin: China
- Region or state: Guangdong
- Serving temperature: Hot
- Main ingredients: Noodles, soy sauce, vegetables, chicken, pork, beef, shrimp

Lo mein
- Traditional Chinese: 撈麵
- Simplified Chinese: 捞面
- Literal meaning: noodles
Transcriptions
Standard Mandarin
- Hanyu Pinyin: lāo miàn
Yue: Cantonese
- Yale Romanization: lōu mihn
- Jyutping: lou1 min6
Southern Min
- Hokkien POJ: hôo-mī

Alternative Chinese name
- Traditional Chinese: 拌麵
- Simplified Chinese: 拌面
Transcriptions
Standard Mandarin
- Hanyu Pinyin: bàn miàn
Yue: Cantonese
- Yale Romanization: buhn mihn
- Jyutping: bun6 min6
Southern Min
- Hokkien POJ: puānn-mī

Lo mein (traditional Chinese: 撈麵/撈麪; simplified Chinese: 捞面; Cantonese Yale: lou^{1} min^{6}; pinyin: lāo miàn) is a Chinese dish with noodles. When prepared in the Cantonese style, it is often topped with or accompanied by meat (such as char siu or beef brisket), wontons, or vegetables, and may be served with a bowl of broth.

== Etymology ==
The term lo mein comes from the Cantonese 撈麵, meaning "stirred noodles". The Cantonese use of the character 撈, pronounced lou and meaning "to stir", in its casual form, differs from the character's traditional Han meaning of "to dredge" or "to scoop out of water" in Mandarin, in which case it would be pronounced as laau or lou in Cantonese (lāo in Mandarin). In Mandarin, the dish is called lāo miàn. In its country of origin, it is made of thin flour-and-egg noodles which are notable for their elastic texture.

== Regional variations ==
=== Northern China ===
In northern China, bàn miàn (拌面) can refer to many other types of wheat noodles without egg, including laghman in Xinjiang.

=== Guangdong ===
In Cantonese cuisine, lo mein (撈麵) typically consists of boiled wheat noodles that are tossed in a sauce, such as oyster sauce, or are served with a sauce alongside. It may be accompanied by items such as wontons, char siu, or beef brisket. Unlike chow mein, Cantonese-style lo mein is not traditionally pan-fried or stir-fried.

=== American Chinese cuisine ===
In American Chinese restaurants, lo mein is a popular take-out food and is sometimes considered synonymous with chow mein. The dish is distinct from both Cantonese lo mein and Cantonese crispy chow mein. U.S. lo mein noodles are usually stir-fried with a sauce made from soy sauce and other seasonings. Vegetables such as bok choy and cabbage can be mixed in and meats like roast pork, beef or chicken are often added. Shrimp lo mein, lobster lo mein, vegetable lo mein, and "house" lo mein (more than one meat) are sometimes available.

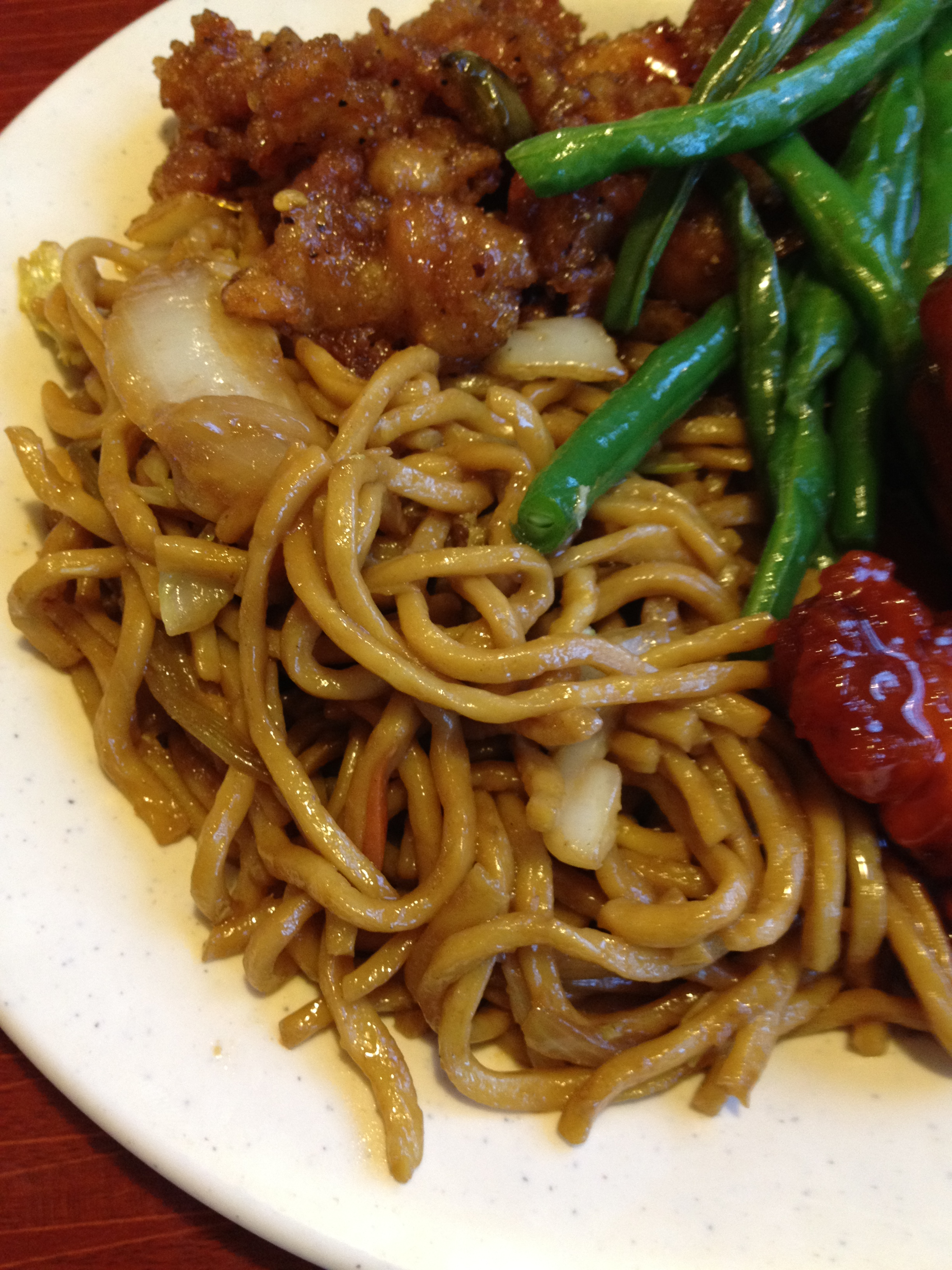
American-style lo mein

=== Indonesian Chinese cuisine ===
In Indonesian Chinese cuisine, lo mein is made using egg noodles or "mie hokkien". Egg noodles are made of wheat flour and eggs, commonly formed as a ribbon shape.

== See also ==
- Chinese noodles
- Lamian
- Lomi
- Laghman
- Pancit
- Pho
- Ramen
- Stir fry
- Yakisoba
