= Laghman Express =

Restaurant in New York City, U.S.

- Interactive map of Laghman Express

Restaurant information
- Established: October 2023
- Location: 6201 20th Avenue, Brooklyn, New York, 11204, United States
- Coordinates: 40°37′05″N 73°59′02″W
- Website: laghmanexpress.com

Laghman Express is a restaurant serving Uyghur cuisine in New York City. It has been named one of “the 100 best restaurants in New York City” on multiple occasions by The New York Times.
