= Laghman =

Laghman can refer to:

- Laghman Province in Afghanistan
- Laghman, Jowzjan, a place in Jowzjan Province, Afghanistan
- Laghman (food), a noodle dish

== See also ==
- Aramaic Inscription of Laghman, Afghanistan
- Lagman (disambiguation)
- Laghmani, a surname
