= Dapanji =

Chinese and Dungan stewed chicken dish

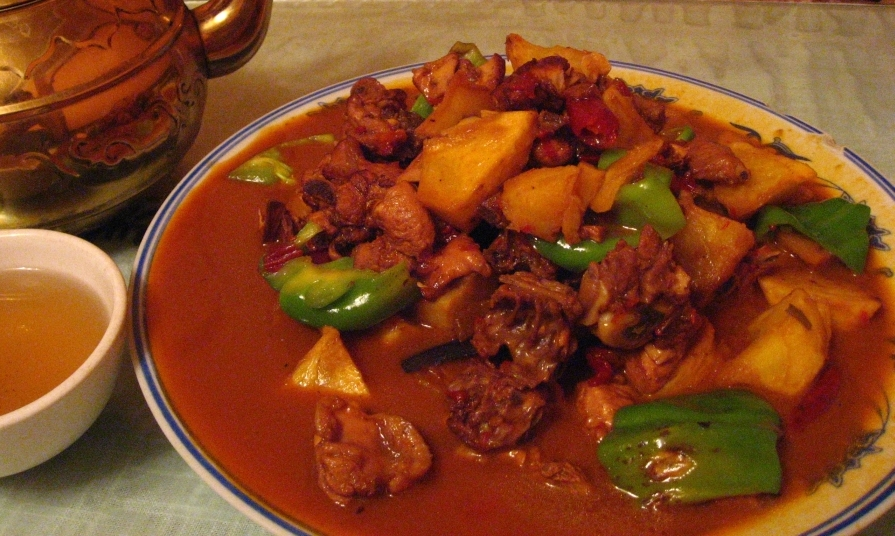
A plate of dapanji, as served in Ürümqi

Dapanji (Dungan: Da pan ji; Chinese: 大盘鸡; pinyin: Dàpánjī; lit. 'big plate chicken'; Uyghur: چوڭ تەخسە توخۇ قورۇمىسى, romanized: chong texse toxu qorumisi) is a spicy chicken stew that was invented by a Han Chinese chef in Shawan, Xinjiang in the 1980s. Although originally considered Chinese rather than Uyghur, the chef made the dish halal to accommodate local religious customs, and it quickly became popular among the local Uyghur population.

== History ==
Dapanji first appeared in Shawan in the late 1980s. The dish gained popularity in Xinjiang in the mid-to-late 1990s. It is said to have been invented in Shawan, Northern Xinjiang, by a Han Chinese migrant chef from Sichuan named Li, who mixed hot chili peppers with chicken and potatoes in an attempt to reproduce a Sichuan taste. Although Shawan is generally believed to the place of origin of the dish, there are also other claims of origin, including an invention by a Hunan native at Chaiwopu Lake near Ürümqi. Some believed the dish was originally served in a number of smaller plates, but later a large single plate was used instead which gave it its name. The dish was served by restaurateurs along the Xinjiang highways as a quick fix for truck drivers who often arrived at an odd time of the day. Its rich flavor and heartiness quickly made the dish a favorite of the region and the dish then spread to the rest of China.

== Ingredients and preparation ==
The main ingredients are chicken, bell peppers and potatoes, cooked with onions, garlic, ginger, chili peppers, ground cumin, star anise, ground Sichuan peppers, cooking oil, also optionally soy sauce and beer.

The chicken is cut into bite size pieces (usually boneless), sautéed with spices and coarsely chopped vegetables and simmered in broth, providing a savory and spicy stew. It is usually served with laghman (wide, hand-stretched noodles; known as latiaozi or kudaimian in China) and shared by family and friends in a communal manner.

Other variations of the dish may be served with nan (馕包大盘鸡), a staple bread widely consumed in Xinjiang, usually served baked or roasted in Xinjiang restaurants and other places.

== See also ==
- Dak-bokkeum-tang
- Xinjiang cuisine
