= Youtazi =

Steamed multi-layer bread eaten in China

- Type: Bread
- Place of origin: China
- Region or state: Xinjiang Uyghur Autonomous Region

Youtazi (Uyghur: يۇتازا, romanized: yutaza, йутаза) is a type of steamed multi-layer bread. It is eaten within the Xinjiang Uyghur Autonomous Region of China.

== See also ==
- Uyghur cuisine
