= Uyghur cuisine =

Culinary traditions of the Uyghur people

Uyghur name
- Uyghur: ئۇيغۇر تائاملىرى
Transcriptions
- Latin Yëziqi: Uyghur ta'amliri
- Siril Yëziqi: Уйғур таамлири

Chinese name
- Simplified Chinese: 维吾尔菜
- Traditional Chinese: 維吾爾菜
Transcriptions
Standard Mandarin
- Hanyu Pinyin: Wéiwú'ěr cài

Uyghur cuisine is characterized by ingredients such as roasted mutton and beef, as well as kebab and rice dishes. Traditionally, specific dishes like polo are eaten with one's bare hands instead of with utensils like spoons, forks or chopsticks. Signature dishes include polo, laghman and nan. Because the majority of Uyghur people are Muslim, the food is predominantly halal.

== History ==
Around the 4th century, the majority of Uyghurs led a nomadic lifestyle and therefore relied on livestock for food. Aside from their meat, dairy products made from their milk became a staple for many families. Especially horse milk was widely used and consumed as horses were also held for transportation purposes. Many of the practices of this nomadic diet can still be observed in the descendants of Uyghurs who immigrated from the Mongolian Plateau to the Gansu Province. Scholars note that Uyghur cuisine developed through Silk Road exchanges, combining Turkic, Persian, and Central Asian influences.

After the Uyghurs accepted Islam as their state religion in the 1060s, many adopted a halal diet. By this time, they had shifted to an agricultural lifestyle. The area around Hotan was regarded as especially fertile and yielded a large variety of fruits, which led to the gradual settlement of people throughout the region. With this change, the food sources were diversified and flour-based dishes, mutton, and vegetables became integral to the cuisine. The Compendium of the Languages of the Turks from 1074, for example, lists a total of 14 types of bread made from wheat flour and we know from its descriptions that noodles, rice, millet, chöchüre (Uyghur: چۆچۈرە; a kind of dumpling soup), and sausages made from grains and meat were also commonly eaten. Many traditional Uyghur cooking methods also date back to around this time of the Karakhan Empire.

Since the Tarim Basin was located along the Silk Road, Uyghur cuisine has been influenced by various Chinese foods, seasonings, and cooking methods, such as stir-frying, which were introduced from the east after the Tang dynasty. In recent years, Russian cuisine has spread to Uyghurs from countries like the Kyrgyz Republic, which was once part of the Soviet Union. In addition, some people around Turfan have started practicing Buddhism, making vegetarian dishes more prevalent in this region.

In 2023, the Kashgar public security bureau stated, "Muslim halal customs create an unbridgeable gap between Uyghur and Han people and widen the distance between them as would an invisible wall."

== Characteristics ==
Uyghur cuisine is centered around bringing out the natural flavors of the individual ingredients used in a dish. Meals usually consist of a mix of meat and seasonal vegetables, served alongside rice, handmade noodles, or nan. While mutton and beef are the most commonly used meats, chicken and goose are also served often, and sometimes even pigeon is eaten. Onions, carrots, potatoes, tomatoes, peppers, Chinese cabbage, and eggplant are frequently utilized in cooking.

Typical spices include salt, black pepper, cumin seeds, and red pepper flakes. Red pepper flakes are used to make laza (Лаза), a chili sauce made with garlic and hot oil and commonly served with läghmän or benschä, Uyghur-style dumplings. Animal fats and butter are also used to flavor dishes.

Unlike many Asian ethnic groups, Uyghur people are typically not lactose-intolerant and dairy products such as kumis (Uyghur: قىمىز; a horse milk drink), ayran, and yogurt are therefore consumed frequently.

As the majority of Uyghur people are Muslim, their food shares similarities to that of other Muslim peoples in Asia, such as Uzbeks, Kazakhs, and Turks. Similarly, many Uyghur dishes can also be found among other ethnic groups in Central Asia. A traditional Uyghur-style breakfast might consist of nan and milk tea, which might be topped with jams or honey and eaten with raisins, walnuts, and other nuts.

Guests are greeted with tea, nan, pastries, and fruits before the main dishes are ready.

== Dishes ==
=== Main course ===
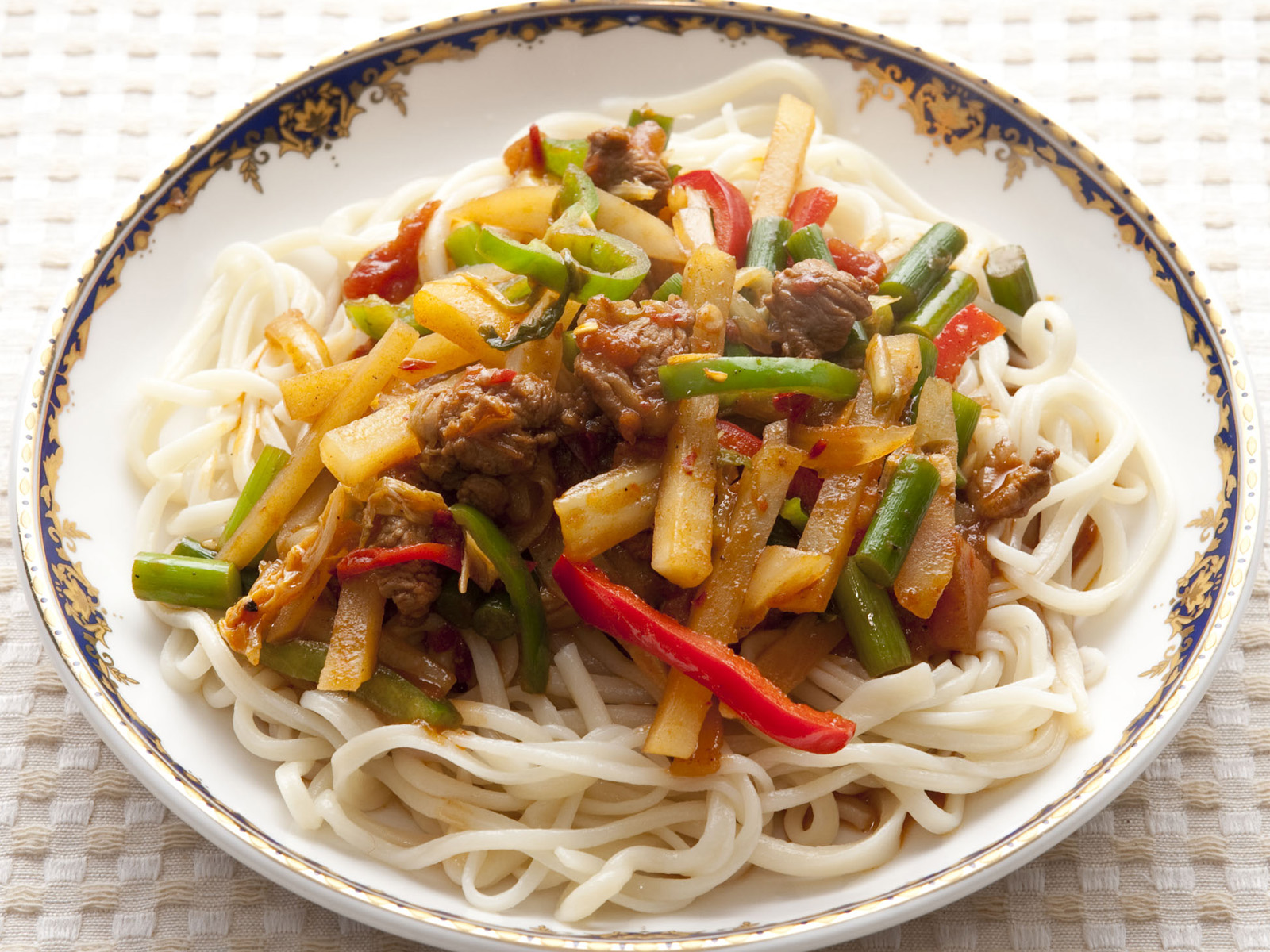
Uyghur läghmän (لەڭمەن)

A common Uyghur dish is läghmän (Uyghur: لەڭمەن, ләғмән; Chinese: 手拉麵; pinyin: shǒu lāmiàn), boiled hand-pulled noodles made with wheat flour and eaten with säy, a stir-fried topping usually made with mutton, onions, peppers, tomatoes, and other seasonal vegetables. The dish was most likely derived from the Chinese lamian and adapted to create a distinctively Uyghur flavor. Naren chöp (Uyghur: چۆپ نارىن) is a different noodle dish that is topped with a thin sauce of lamb, onions, and carrot and seasoned with a large amount of black or white pepper.

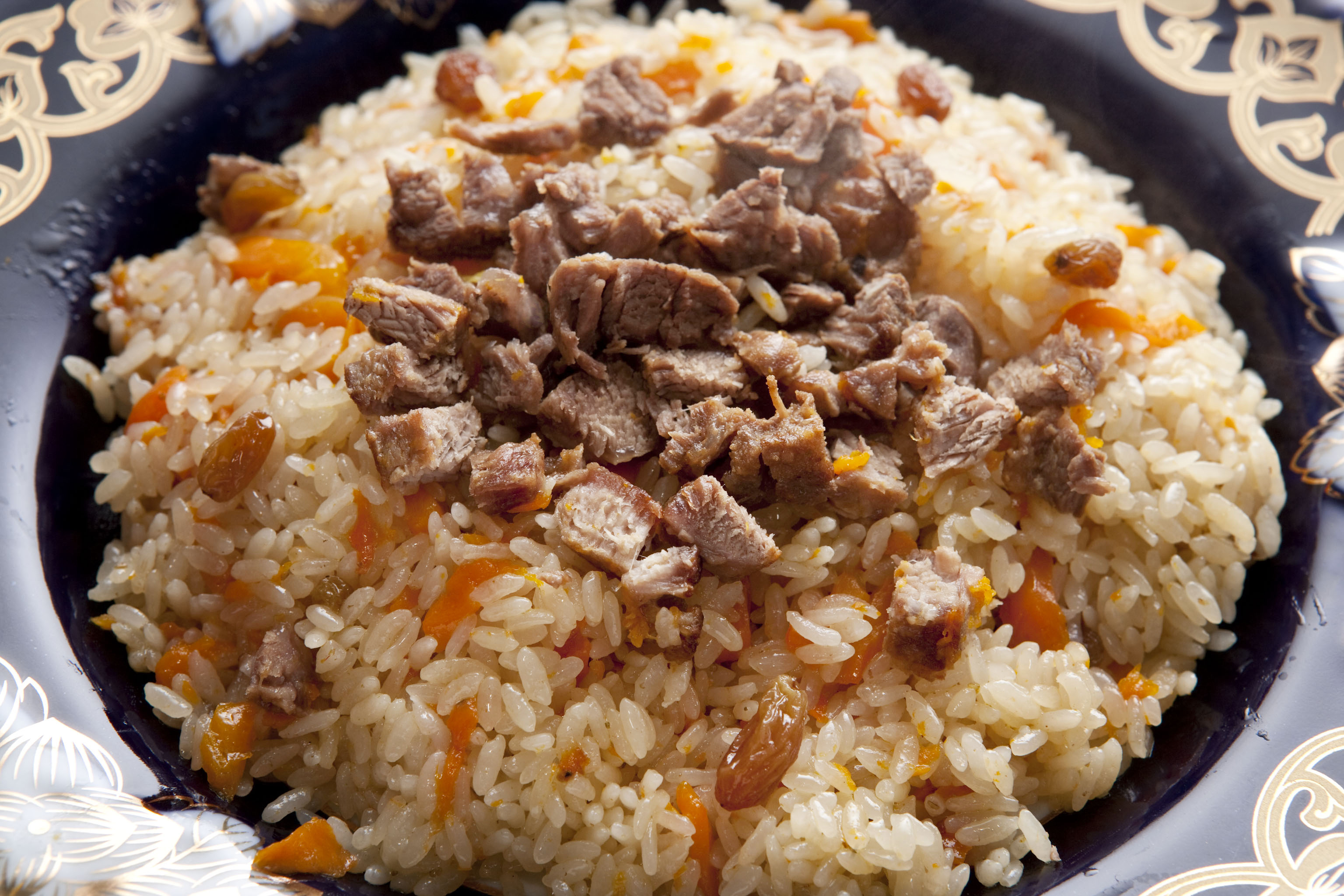
Uyghur polo (پولۇ)

Another typical Uyghur dish is polo (Uyghur: پولۇ, полу; Chinese: 抓飯; pinyin: zhuāfàn), a variation of pilaf, a dish that can be found throughout Central Asia. It is made by frying mutton or chicken, onions, and thinly sliced carrots in oil before adding rice and water and steaming it. Raisins and dried apricots may also be added. While it is traditionally made in a cast-iron pan, nowadays it is often transferred to a rice cooker for steaming. To balance out the oiliness of the polo, it is commonly served with salad or cold vermicelli noodles with raw vegetables (pintoza ham säy; lit. 'vermicelli noodles and raw vegetables'). A simple dish of steamed white rice with stir-fried vegetables is called gangpen (Uyghur: گاڭپەن; Chinese: 干飯; pinyin: gānfàn).

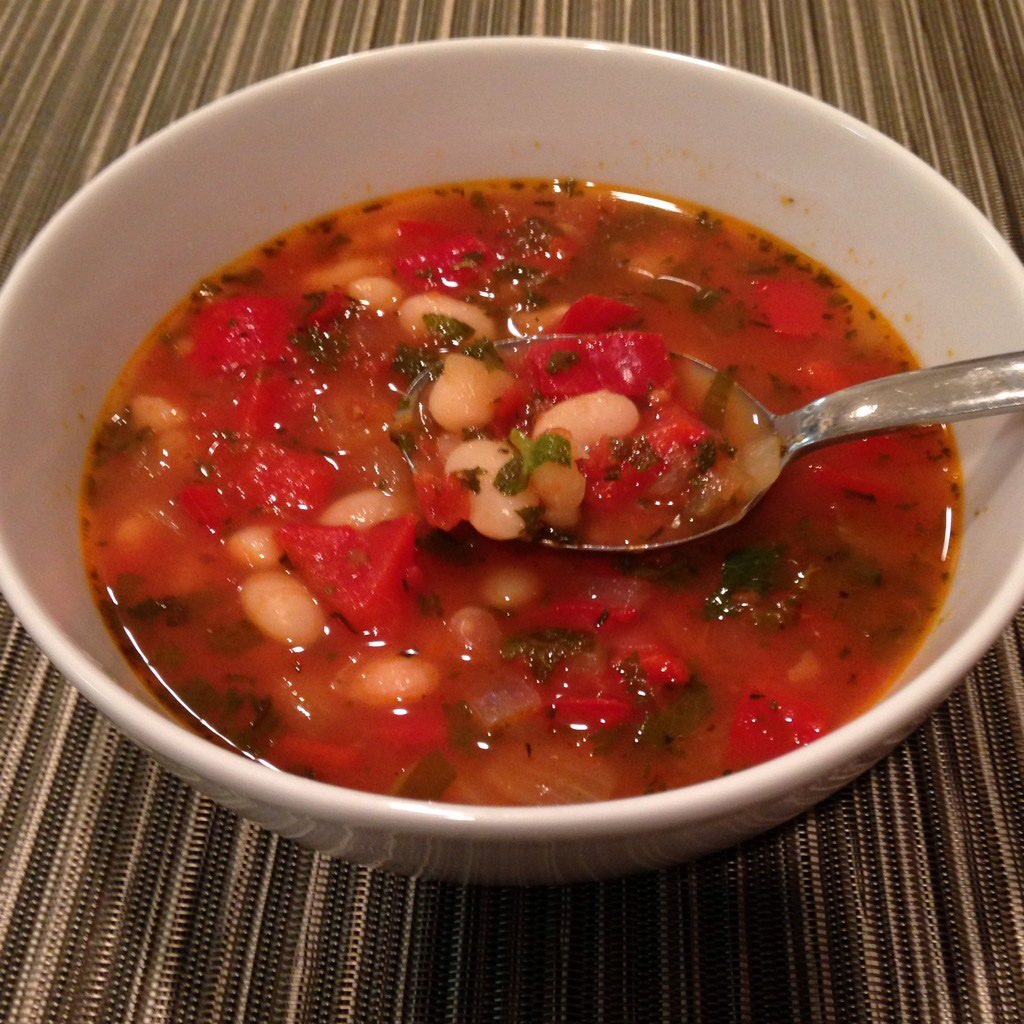
Shorba

There are also many varieties of soups, the most popular ones being shorpa (Uyghur: شورپا, Шорпа; Chinese: 羊汤; pinyin: yáng tāng), a lamb soup, and suykash (Uyghur: سۇيۇقئاش, lit. 'liquid food'), a type of soup made with noodles, meat, and vegetables such as potatoes and turnips. A special kind of suykash is tashlap suykash (lit. 'thrown liquid food', which contains handmade noodles that are pulled and then ripped into small, thumb-size pieces and thrown into the boiling soup. There are also stews like yapma (Uyghur: ياپمانان), which is made with lamb or beef, onions, potatoes, carrots, and tomatoes.

Like in many East and Southeast Asian countries, congee is also eaten by the Uyghur people, which is called shoyla (Uyghur: شويلا) in Uyghur. Aside from congee, there is also umaq, corn porridge made with corn flour, onion, turnips, and tomatoes and seasoned with salt.

A dish that has been adapted from Chinese and Russian cuisine is manta (Uyghur: مانتا), a steamed dumpling filled with meat and Chinese cabbage or spinach. There are many varieties of this dish: pitir-manta (Uyghur: پەتىل مانتا), which features a thinner wrapper and may also contain zucchini or pumpkin; boluq manta (Uyghur: بولۇق مانتا), which uses a significantly thicker, yeasted dough; benschä, a smaller version that is boiled in water instead of steamed; and chöchüre, which are shaped like tortellini and are served in a tomato-based soup broth.

=== Meat ===
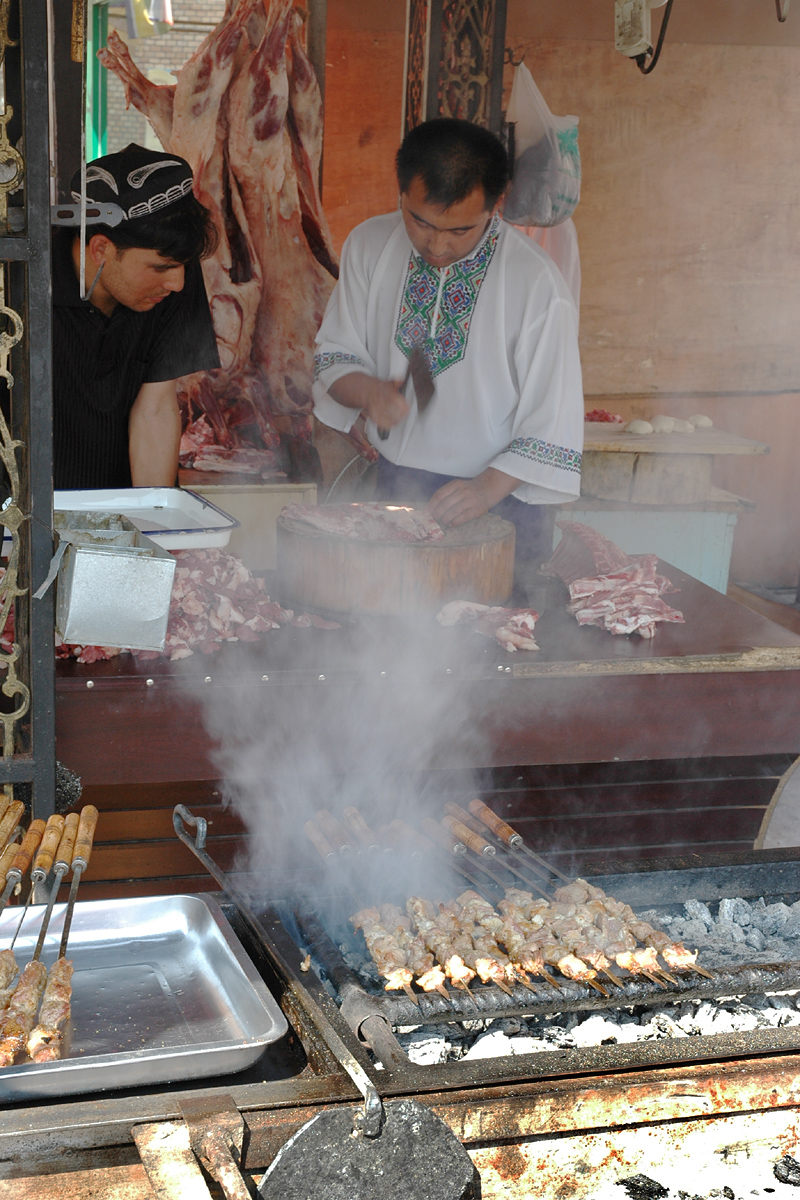
Kawaplar (lamb kebabs)

Meat is a main ingredient in many Uyghur dishes. The most well-known meat dish are kawaplar (Uyghur: كاۋاپلار, каваплар), which are kebabs made from lamb or beef and seasoned with salt, black pepper, chili powder, and cumin and directly eaten off the skewer. While usually made on a grill and sold in food stalls on the road, there are also tunur kawap (Chinese: 饢坑肉; pinyin: náng kēng ròu), which are made in a tunur clay oven.

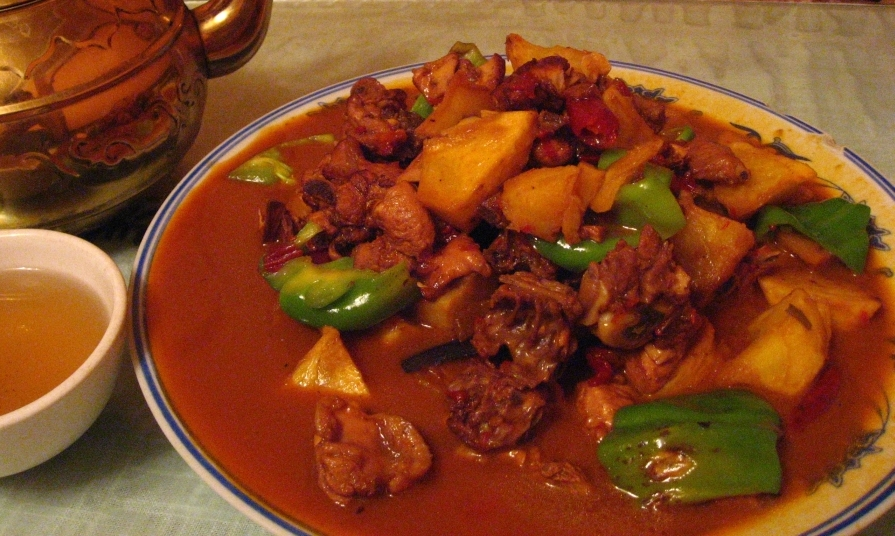
A plate of dapanji, as served in Ürümqi

A dish that gained popularity in the mid to late 1990s is dapanji (Uyghur: چوڭ تەخسە توخۇ قورۇمىسى; Chinese: 大盤雞; pinyin: dàpánjī) or chong texse toxu qorumis (Uyghur: чоң тәхсә тоху қорумиси, lit. 'big plate chicken'), a Chinese-Uyghur fusion dish. A spicy, hot chicken stew is served on a big plate and after the chicken has been eaten, flat, hand-pulled noodles are added to the remaining sauce. The dish was invented in Shawan, Northern Xinjiang by a migrant from Sichuan who mixed hot chili peppers with chicken and potatoes in an attempt to reproduce a Sichuan taste.

=== Bread ===
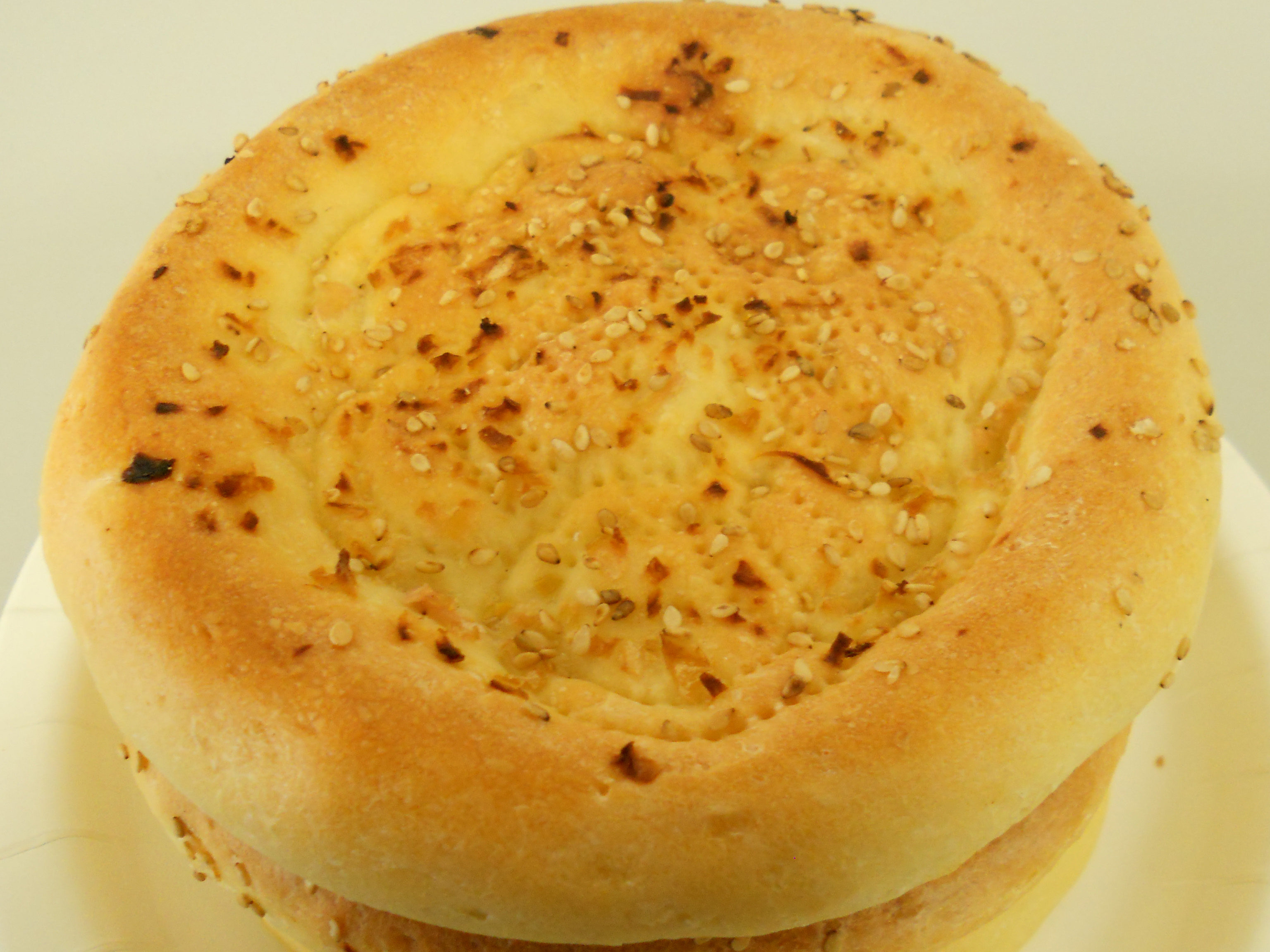
Uyghur nan (نان)

Nan (Uyghur: نان, нан; Chinese: 饢; pinyin: náng) is one of the oldest components of Uyghur cuisine and an integral part of the diet. While it is often mistaken as a specific type of bread, it is merely a generic term. The most common style of nan is hemek nan, a baked flatbread with a thicker crust made with wheat flour, salt, water, and vegetable oil and optionally topped with sesame or black cumin seeds. Another popular type of bread is girde (Гирде), which is a thick, bagel-shaped bread with a hard and crispy crust that resembles bialy. Toqatch nan (Uyghur: توقاچ نان), which is baked in a deep clay oven called a tunur (Uyghur: تونۇر), is also a staple in many households.

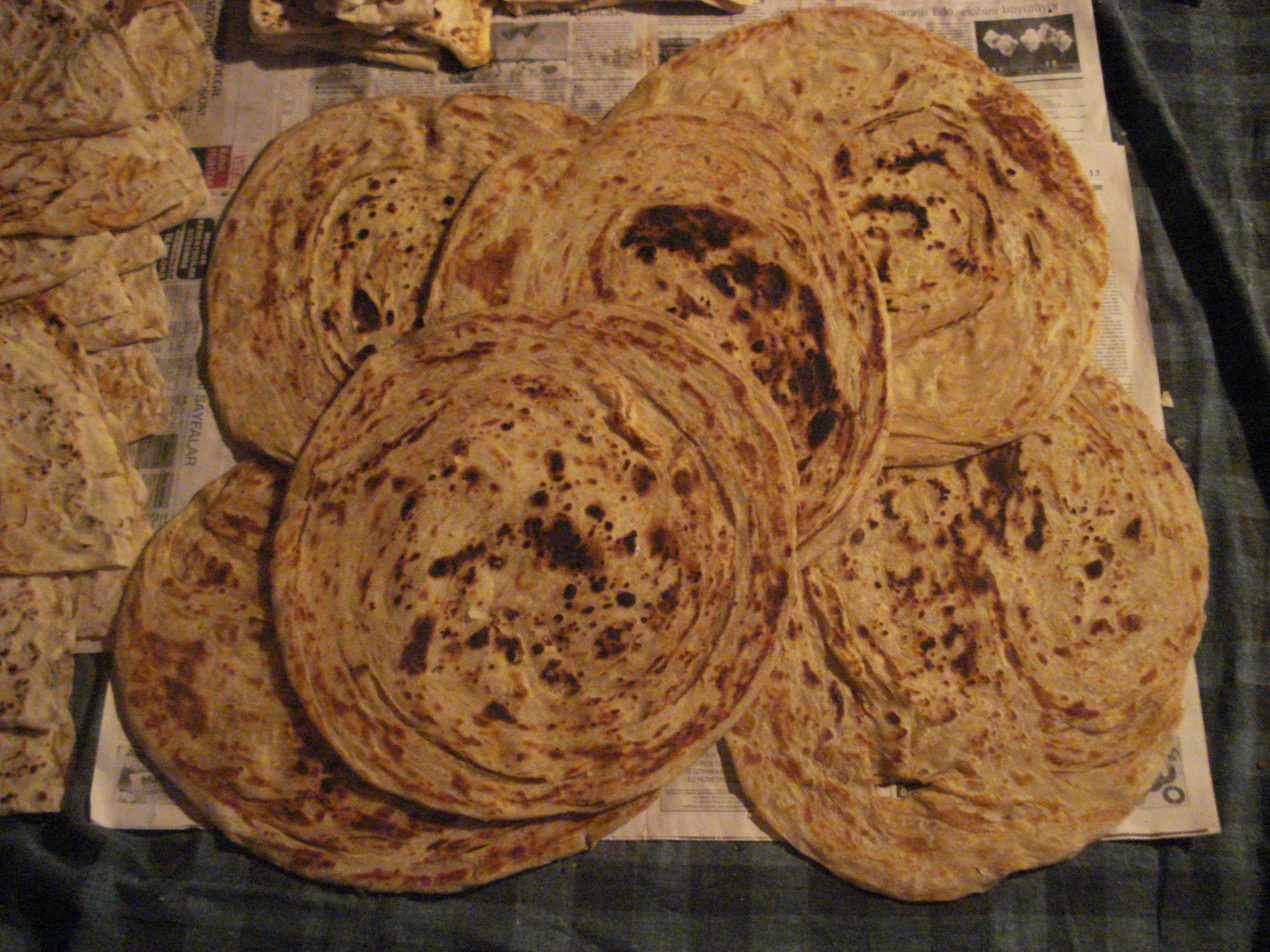
Qatlama

There are also steamed breads such as yutaza (Uyghur: يۇتازا, йутаза; Chinese: 油塔子; pinyin: yóutiáozi), which is a multi-layered type of bread made with animal fat. A style of yeasted fried bread called peushkel (Uyghur: پۆشكەل) is typically eaten with soups and stews. A multi-layered, thin, pan-fried bread called qatlima (Uyghur: قاتلىما) is usually prepared using leftover dough from other dishes.

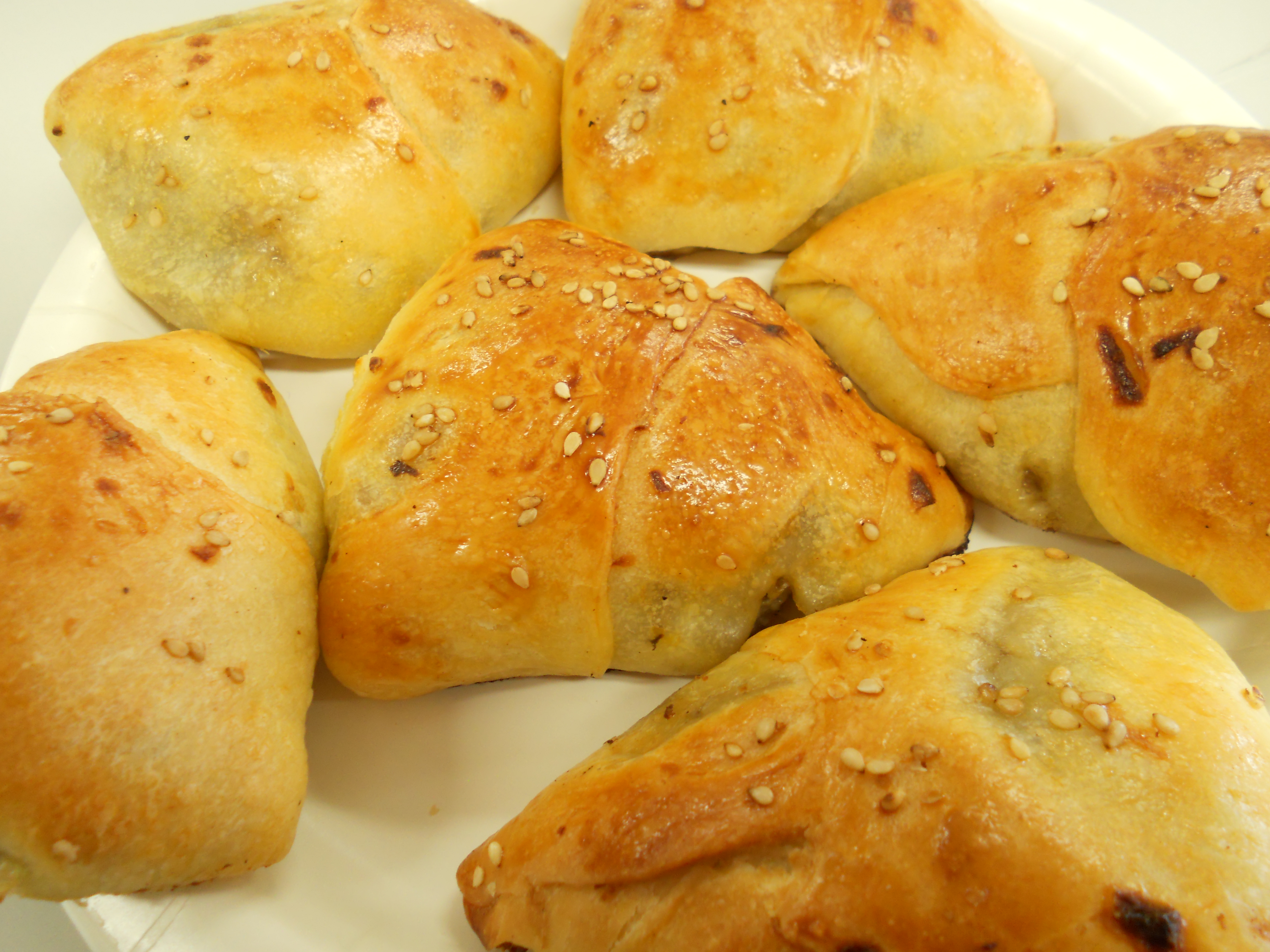
Uyghur samsa (سامسا)

Aside from nan, there are also many types of filled bread such as samsa (Uyghur: سامسا, Самса; Chinese: 烤包子; pinyin: kǎo bāozi), which are hand-held lamb pies roasted in a tunur. A flat, pan-grilled variety with a similar filling is called göshnan (Uyghur: گۆشنان, Гөшнан; Chinese: 饢包肉; pinyin: náng bāo ròu). Aside from lamb, baked pamirdin pies also stuffed with onions and carrots. Sambusa (Uyghur: سامبۇسا) are fried Uyghur empanada filled with meat, rice, and carrots.

=== Desserts ===
The most common flavors in Uyghur desserts are honey, nuts, raisins, and sultanas. Bakkali (Uyghur: باققالى), a light and moist nut cake made with honey and walnuts, is a popular traditional dessert. Aside from walnuts, other types of nuts or raisins may be used as well. Soft cookies called pichene (Uyghur: پېچىنە), which are made with plain, sweet dough, cut into shapes, and brushed with egg yolks, are commonly eaten with tea.

There is also a large scope of fried desserts. Eshme quymaq (Uyghur: ئەشمە قۇيماق) or maxar (Uyghur: ماخار; Chinese: 麻花児; pinyin: máhuār) are twisted doughnuts, which are widely sold by street vendors. They are often made from two separate doughs: one sweetened with honey and the other with sugar. The honey dough takes on a deeper color while frying, giving the doughnuts a dual-colored appearance. Another street snack is matang, a thick and chewy bar consisting of various nuts held together by a sugar syrup that is usually sold by the slice.

A holiday specialty is sangza (Uyghur: ساڭزا, Саңза; Chinese: 馓子; pinyin: sǎnzi), a snack made by pulling a dough made of wheat flour into thin ropes and deep frying them. The crispy ropes are then twisted around each other and piled high on top of each other.

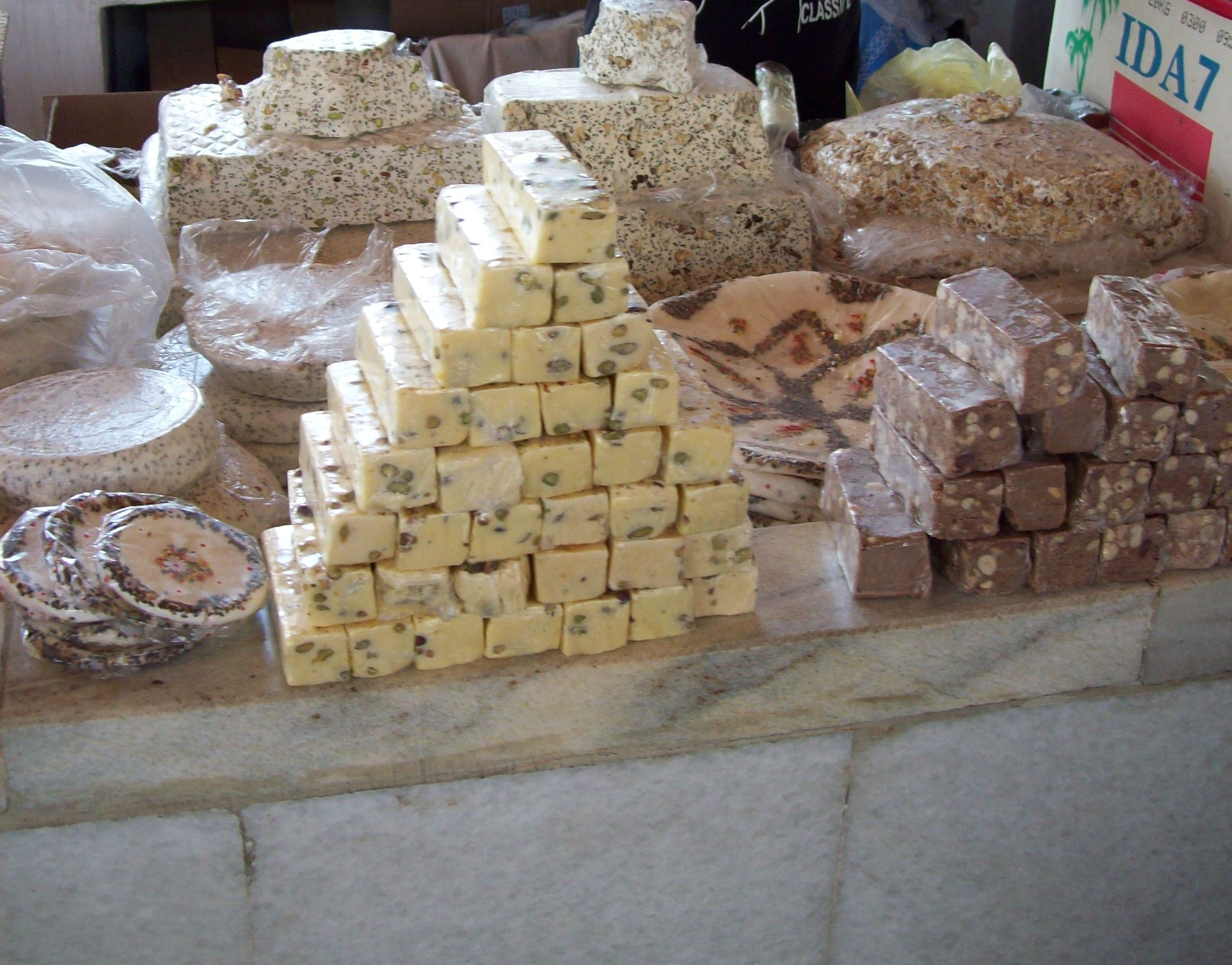
Halva

Halva (Uyghur: ھالۋا) is a sweet porridge made with corn flour and cooked with chopped onions, turnips, and tomatoes. It is also often eaten during sickness as the sweet stickiness of the porridge coats the throat and alleviates soreness.

A sweet version of manta called sheker manta (Uyghur: شېكەر مانتا, lit. 'sugar manta') is often given as a treat to children. They are stuffed with walnuts and honey or brown sugar, the latter of which melts during steaming, soaking the inside of the dumpling in a thick, sweet syrup.

Fruits are also an important component of the Uyghur diet and are eaten as snacks with or in-between meals. Commonly eaten fruits include grapes, apples, watermelons, apricots, and figs.

=== Beverages ===
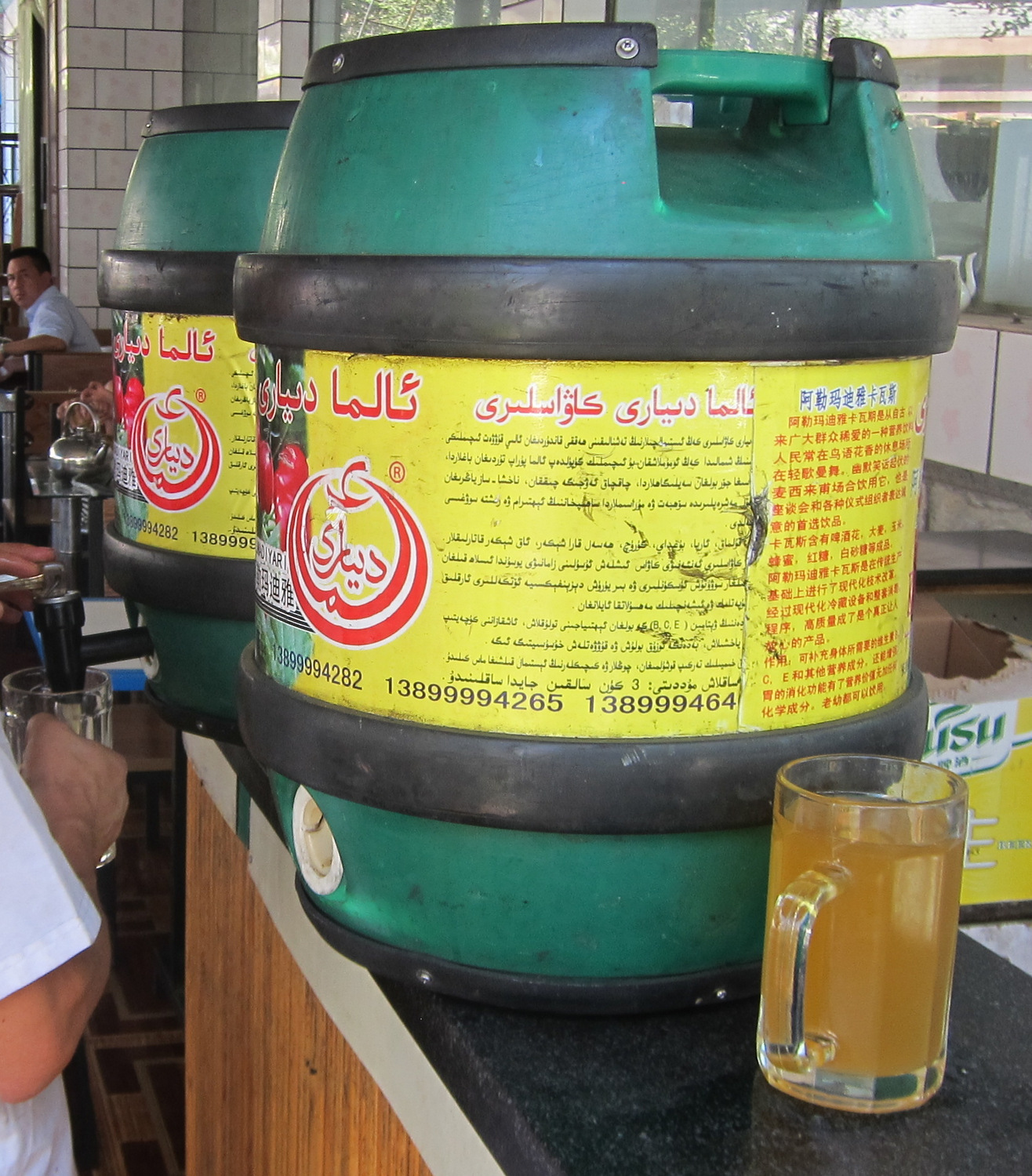
Kvass served in a restaurant in Ürümqi

In Uyghur custom, tea (chay, Uyghur: چاي) is drunk multiple times throughout the day and at least with every meal. Tea is held in high regard as it is believed to have therapeutic properties and to help cure illnesses and is often hailed as a universal medicine (chay dora, Uyghur: چاي دورا, lit. 'tea medicine') by Uyghurs. It also plays an important role in many ceremonies and is seen as an indispensable part of good customer service and for successful business negotiations. Other medicinal teas made from herbs and processed plants such as cinnamon, cloves, cumin, black pepper, and ginger are also believed to help with stomach aches and digestive issues, as well as promote blood circulation, heat retention in the body, and alertness.

While green tea is more popular with the Han Chinese, Uyghurs prefer black tea (qara chai, Uyghur: قارا چاي), which is often drunk with milk to make süt chay (Uyghur: شۈت چاي, lit. 'milk tea'). Other commonly consumed teas include red tea (xish chay, Uyghur: خىش چاي) and etken chay (Uyghur: ئەتكەنچاي, әткәнчай). Etken chay is a type of milk tea that has travelled from India to China via the Silk Road. It is made by boiling an equal amount of black tea and milk together and adding salt. Sometimes, butter, sour cream, or various spices are added. The tea is typically served with cake and in a bowl, although typically tea cups are used for other types of tea. The tea may have sesame seeds sprinkled on top.

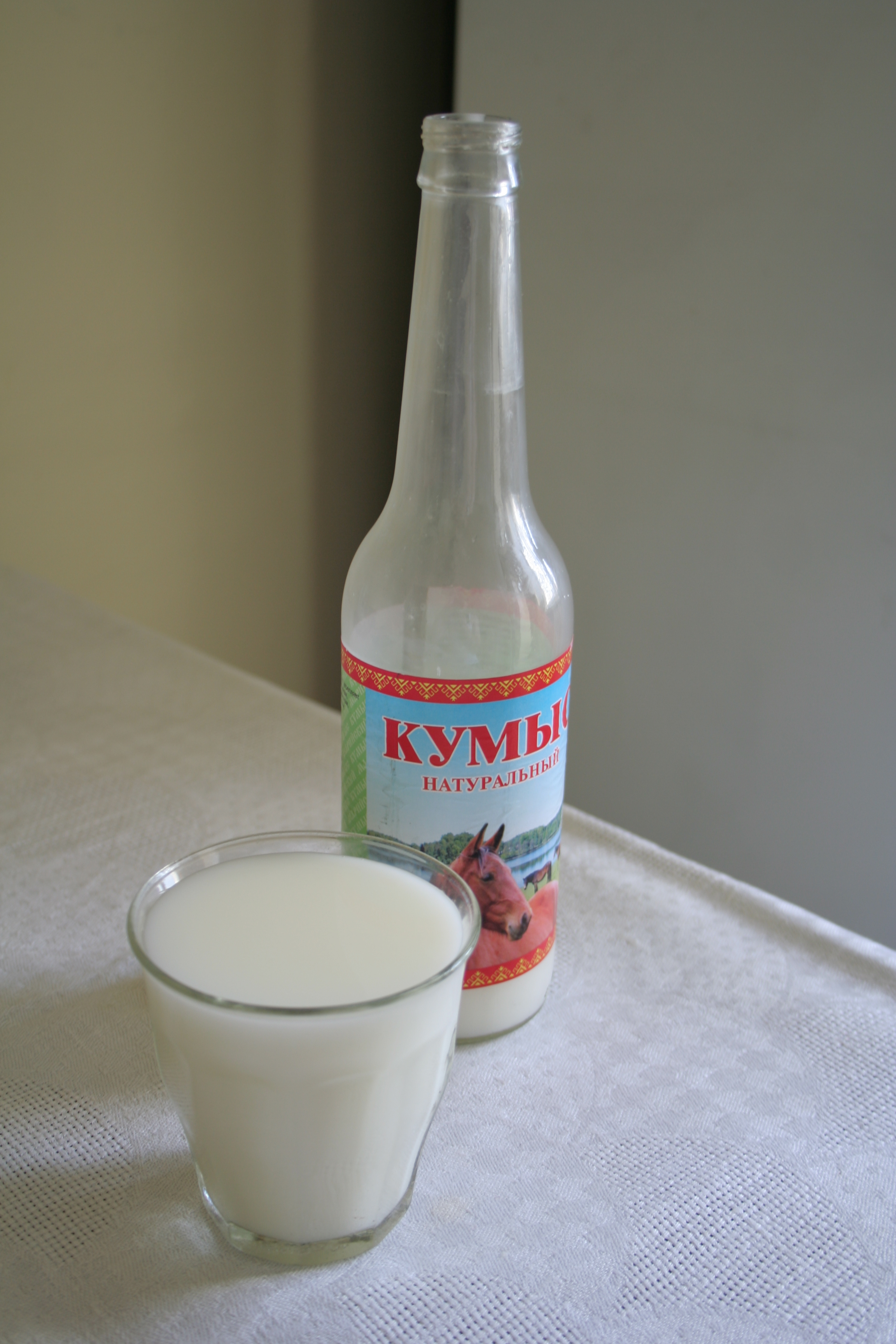
Kumis

Milk-based drinks are popular as well. Raxap (Uyghur: راخاپ) is a type of drinkable yogurt, whereas doghap (Uyghur: دوغاپ) is a chilled version of a similar drink. Ayran (Uyghur: ئايران), a salty yogurt-based drink that is especially popular in Turkey, can also be found in Uyghur communities. A slightly alcoholic variation is kumis (Uyghur: قىمىز), which is made from fermented horse milk and dates all the way back to the 11th century, where it was first mentioned in the Dīwān Lughāt al-Turk.

Due to the warm climate in Xinjiang, the area is highly suited for fermentation, which popularized alcoholic beverages in the area. The most popular beer brands are Wusu, a subsidiary label of the Carlsberg Group which is produced in Xinjiang and is known for having a higher alcohol content than regular Chinese beers, and Sinkiang Black Beer, a nutty black beer made to complement the typical flavors found in Uyghur dishes.

Since Xinjiang is known for its grapes and vineyards, wine is also one of its strongest products. Especially Turfan has been an important part of the local economy and has been well known for its wine since the Tang dynasty. Their medicinal liquor called museles (Uyghur: مۇسەللەش) is made from pickling sliced deer antler, saffron, cardamom, and other spices in wine, infusing it with said flavors. The wine is produced commercially and is also exported outside of the region. Another variety of fruit wine is called sharap (Uyghur: شاراپ).

Kvass (Uyghur: كۇۋاس, квас), a slightly carbonated low-alcohol soft drink made of cereal is consumed by Uyghurs as well. It may be flavored with berries, fruits, herbs, or honey.

== Influence ==
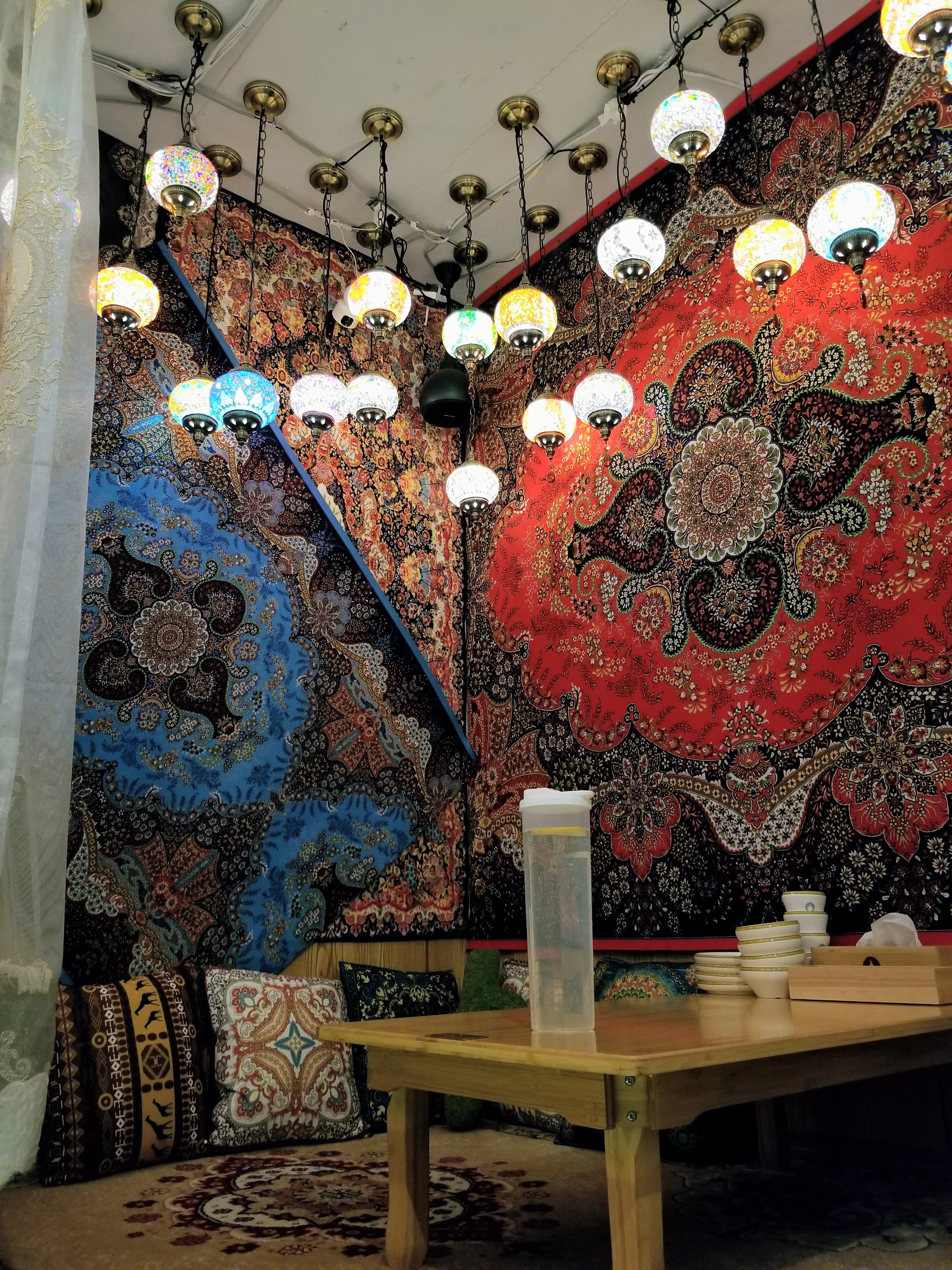
Dining room of a Uyghur restaurant in Tokyo, Japan

Uyghur restaurants can be found in most mid-sized to large cities across China and is a popular ethnic cuisine there. Uyghur shops often sell nan at the counter, which is often bought by Han Chinese people for breakfast. Another popular dish is kawaplar, which is widely available at food stalls in many places. Uyghur restaurants in China are usually qingzhen (Chinese: 清真; pinyin: qīngzhēn) certified, which is another term for halal.

Through franchising, Uyghur cuisine has also found its way outside of China. The Old Mandarin Islamic Restaurant in San Francisco opened in 1997. In April 2015, the restaurant chain Herembağ (Uyghur: ھەرەمباغ, Һәрәмбағ; Chinese: 海爾巴格; pinyin: Hǎi'ěr bā gé) opened its first store in San Francisco in the United States and later expanded with ten more locations within North America. Other popular franchises that service Uyghur food include Yershari, Loulan, Tarhar, and Ali Jiang.

In Japan, Uyghur cuisine is available at specialty restaurants in Sakura-ku, Saitama, Saitama Prefecture, and Shinjuku, Tokyo. In its September 2010 issue, the outdoor magazine BE-PAL described läghmän as using pork instead of mutton and subsequently had to issue an apology for their mistake in November 2010.

== See also ==
- Central Asian cuisine
- Chinese Islamic cuisine
