= Laghman Province =

Province of Afghanistan

Laghman لغمان
- Province
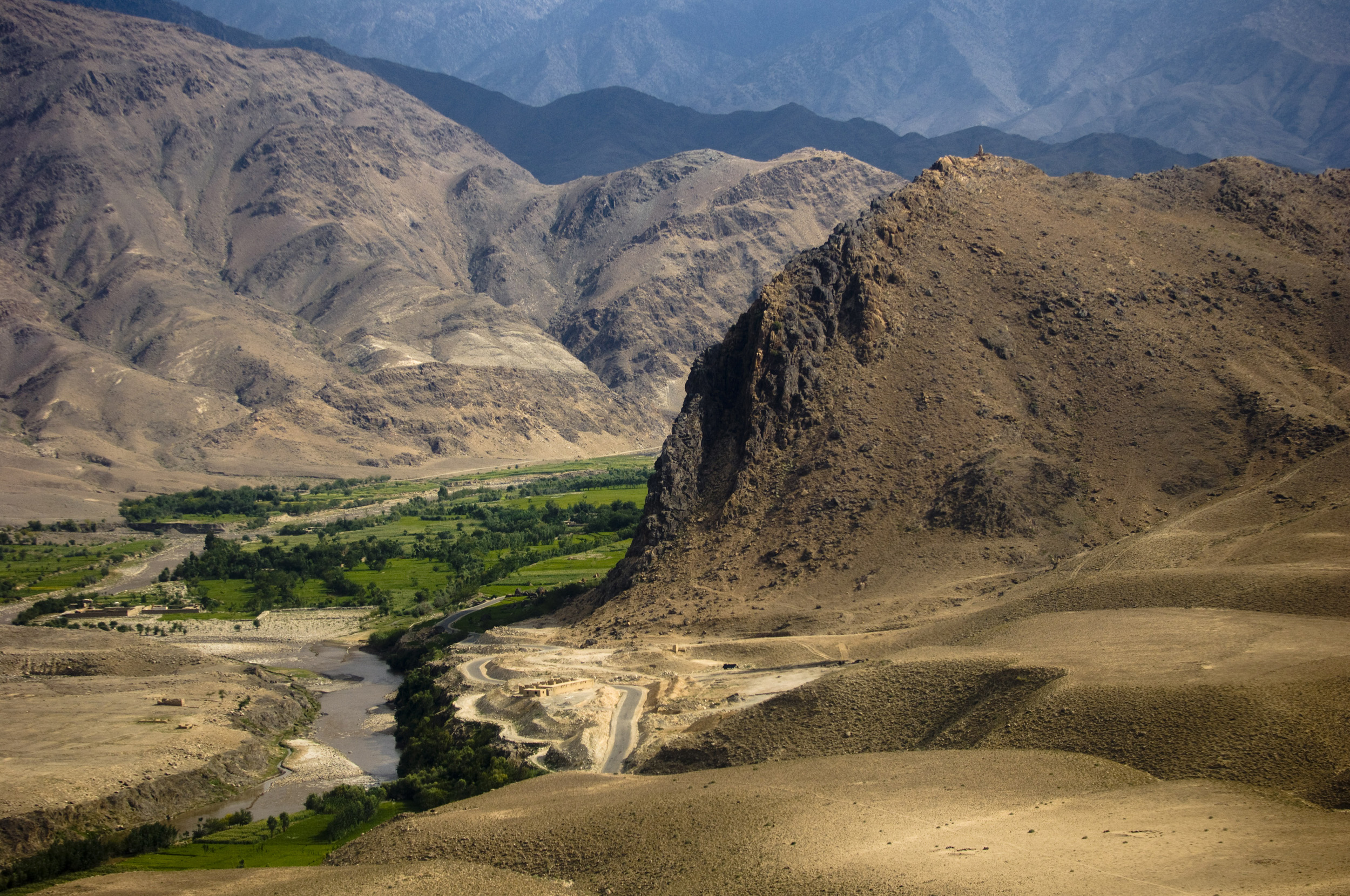
- Lush greenery stands in stark contrast to the surrounding desert in Laghman Province

- Map of Afghanistan with Laghman highlighted
- Coordinates (Capital): 34.66°N 70.20°E
- Country: Afghanistan
- Capital: Mihtarlam

Government
  - Governor: Zain-Ul-Abideen
  - Deputy Governor: Saeed Ahmad

Area
  - Total: 3,842.6 km^{2} (1,483.6 sq mi)

Population (2021)
  - Total: 502,148
  - Density: 130.68/km^{2} (338.46/sq mi)
- Time zone: UTC+4:30 (Afghanistan Time)
- Postal code: 27xx
- ISO 3166 code: AF-LAG
- Main languages: Pashto; Dari; Pashayi

Laghmān (Pashto, (Note: Pashto pronunciation: [laɣ.mɑn]) Dari: (Note: Dari pronunciation: [läɣ.mɑ́ːn]) لغمان), historically known as Lamghan, or Lamghanat, is one of the 34 provinces of Afghanistan, located in the eastern part of the country. It has a population of about 502,148, which is multi-ethnic and mostly a rural society. Laghman hosts a large number of historical landmarks, minarets, monuments, and other cultural relics that are manifestation of its old history and culture. The city of Mihtarlam serves as the capital of the province.

In 2021, the Taliban gained control of the province during the 2021 Taliban offensive.

== Etymology ==
In the Pashayi language, lam means “village”. This is sometimes rendered as ram, depending on the dialect. The province was formerly referred to as Lmaghan, Lmagan, or Lamghan, meaning “owner of a village” or ”village dwellers”.

== History ==
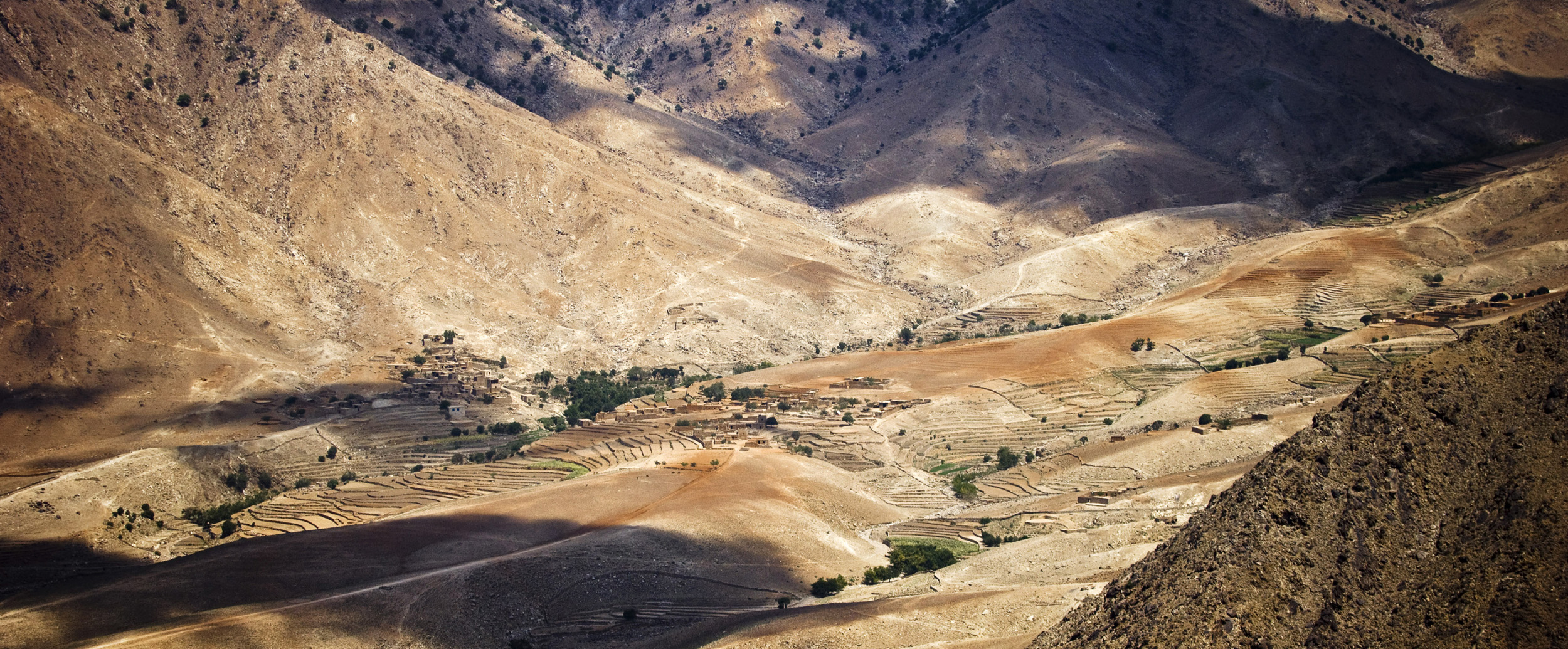
A village sits in a valley in the Hindu Kush Mountain Range in Laghman Province

Located currently at the Kabul Museum are Aramaic inscriptions that were found in Laghman which indicated an ancient trade route from India to Palmyra. Aramaic was the bureaucratic script language of the Achaemenids whose influence had extended toward Laghman. During the invasions of Alexander the Great, the area was known as Lampaka.

Inscriptions in Aramaic dating from the Mauryan Dynasty were found in Laghman which discussed the conversion of Ashoka to Buddhism. The inscription mentions that the distance to Palmyra is 300 dhanusha or yojana.

The Mahamayuri Tantra dated to between the 1-3rd century mentions several popular Yaksha shrines. It mentions Yaksha Kalahapriya being worshipped in Lampaka.

In the seventh century, the Chinese pilgrim Xuanzang visited Laghman, which he called "Lan-pro" and considered part of India. He indicated the presence of Mahayana Buddhists and numerous Hindus, including Brahmins:

"For several centuries the native dynasty had ceased to exist, great families fought for preeminence, and the state had recently become a dependency of Kapis. The country produced upland rice and sugar cane, and it had much wood but little fruit; the climate was mild with little frost and no snow. [...] There were above ten Buddhist monasteries and a few Brethren the most of whom were Mahayanists. The non-Buddhists had a score or two of temples and they were very numerous."

The Ḥudūd al-ʿĀlam which was finished in 982 AD mentioned the presence of some idol worshipping temples in the area, and describes the province as an emporium of Hindūstān.

=== Muslim conquest ===
The Kabul Shahis only retained Lamghan in the Kabul-Gandhara area by the time of Alp-tegin. According to Firishta, Sabuktigin had already begun raiding Lamghan under Alp-begin. He crossed the Khyber Pass many times and raided the territory of Jayapala. He plundered the forts in the outlying provinces of the Kabul Shahi and captured many cities, acquiring huge booty. He also established Islam at many places. Jaipal in retaliation marched with a large force into the valley of Lamghan (Jalalabad) where he clashed with Sabuktigin and his son. The battle stretched on several days until a snowstorm affected Jaipala's strategies, forcing him to sue for peace.

Jayapala then returned to Waihind but broke the treaty and mistreated the amirs sent to collect the tribute. Sabuktigin launched another invasion in retaliation. According to al-Utbi, Sabuktigin attacked Lamghan, conquering it and burning the residences of the "infidels" while also demolishing its idol-temples and establishing Islam. He advanced and butchered the idolaters, destroying the temples and plundering their shrines, even risking frostbite on their hands counting the large booty.

To avenge the savage attack of Sabuktigin, Jayapala, who has earlier taken his envoys as hostage, decided to go to war again in revenge. The forces of Kabul Shahi were however routed and those still alive were killed in the forest or drowned in the river. The second battle that took place between Sabuktigin and Jayapala in 988 A.D., resulted in the former capturing territory between Lamghan and Peshawar. Al-Ubti also states that the Afghans and Khaljis, living there as nomads, took the oath of allegiance to him and were recruited into his army. Sabuktigin won one of his greatest battles in Laghman against Jayapala and his army numbering 100,000. Ghaznavid Sultan Mahmud of Ghazni built the Tomb of Lamech, amid gardens, over the site of his presumed grave, 50 kilometres from Mihtarlam.

In the 14th and 15th centuries, Khārkhay Pashtuns such as Yusupzai and Tarkāṇī invaded the Laghmān valley and displaced the native Indo-Aryans.

During the early years of the 16th century, the Mughal ruler Babur spent much time in Laghman, and in Baburnama (memoirs of Babur) he expatiated on the beauty of forested hillsides and the fertility of the valley bottoms of the region. Laghman was recognized as a dependent district of Kabulistan in the Mughal era, and according to Baburnama, "Greater Lamghanat" included the Muslim-settled part of the Kafiristan, including the easterly one of Kunar River. Laghman was the base for expeditions against the non-believers and was frequently mentioned in accounts of jihads led by Mughal emperor Akbar's younger brother, Mohammad Hakim, who was the governor of Kabul. In 1747, Ahmad Shah Durrani defeated the Mughals and made the territory part of the Durrani Empire. In the late nineteenth century, Amir Abdur Rahman Khan forced the remaining kafirs (Nuristani people) to convert to Islam.

=== Recent history ===
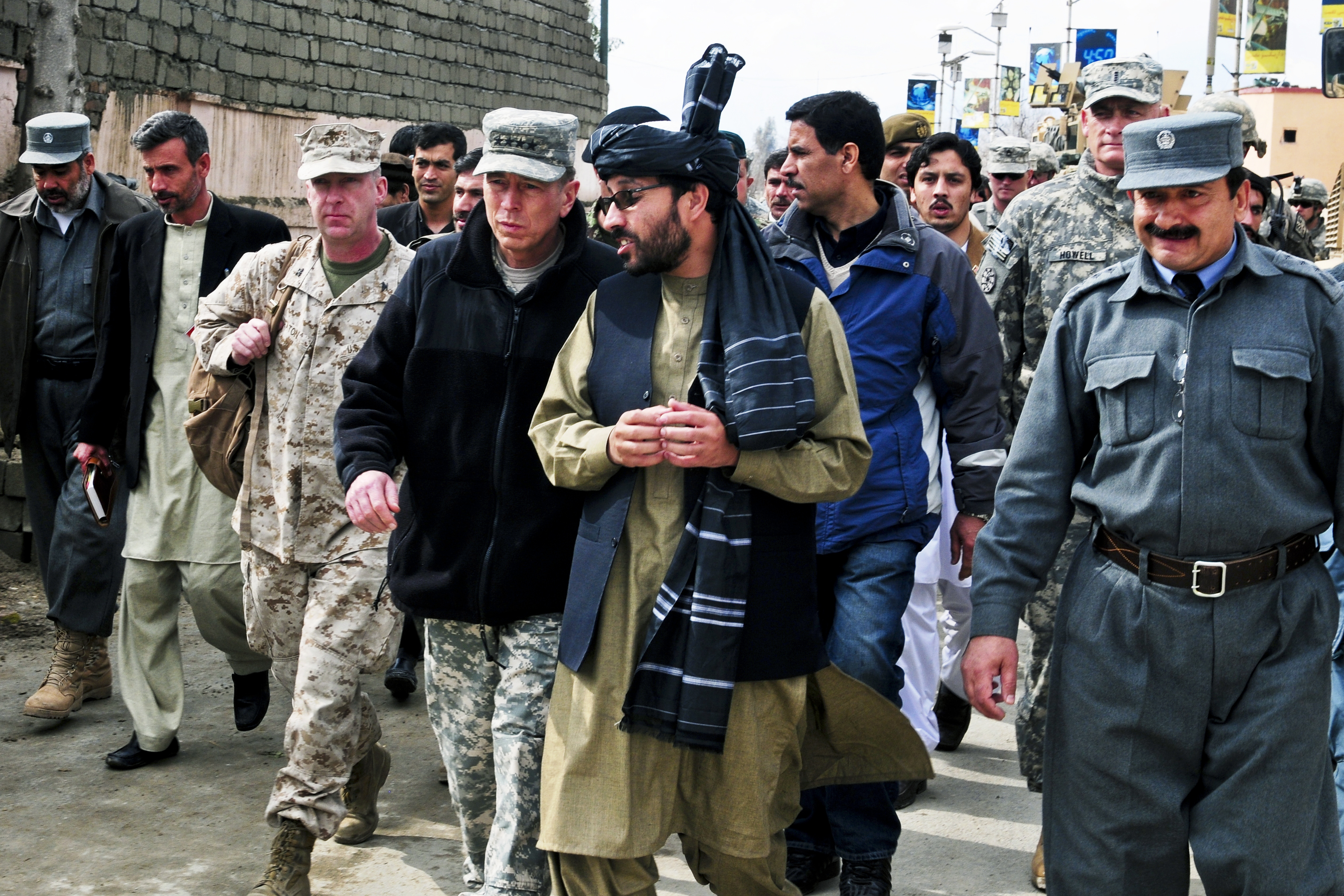
U.S. Army Gen. David Petraeus walking with Governor Iqbal Azizi in 2011.

During the Soviet-Afghan war and the battles that followed between the rivaling warlords, many homes and business establishments in the province were destroyed. The mujahideen were blamed for burning down every school in the province. In addition, the Soviets are said to have employed a strategy that targeted and destroyed the agricultural infrastructure of Laghman. As of 2007, an International Security Assistance Force Provincial Reconstruction Team led by the United States is based at Mihtarlam.

In 2021, the first stadium in Laghman opened in Mihtarlam.

== Administrative divisions ==
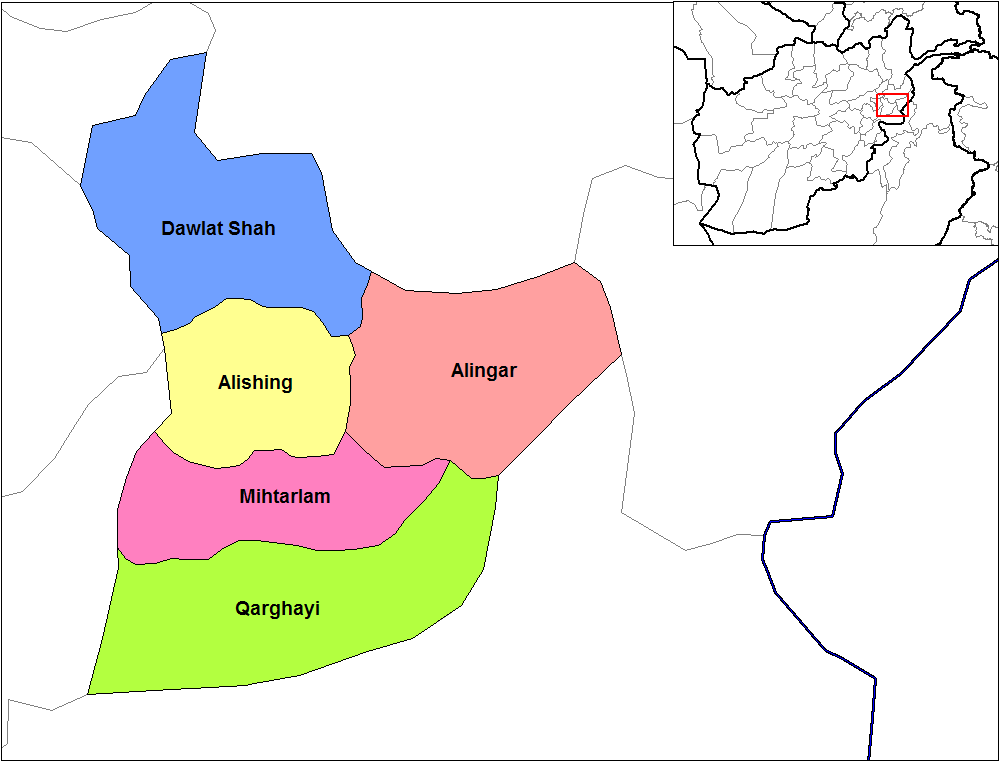
Map of the districts of Laghman as of January 2004, prior to the redrawing of provincial and district boundaries later that year

Districts of Laghman Province
District	Capital	Population (2020)	Area	Pop. density	Notes
Alingar		109,343	804	136	70% Pashtun, 5% Tajik, 25% Pashai.
Alishing		80,645	654	123	60% Pashai, 25% Pashtun, 15% Tajik.
Dawlat Shah		37,599	741	51	70% Pashai, 29% Tajik, 1% Pashtun.
Mihtarlam	Mihtarlam	155,097	758	205	60% Pashtun, 35% Tajik, 5% Pashai. Includes the Badpash District.
Qarghayi		110,804	944	117	60% Pashtun, 20% Tajik, 20% Pashai.
Laghman		493,488	3,978	124	52.0% Pashtuns, 26.7% Pashai, 21.3% Tajiks. (Note: Note: "Predominantely" or "dominated" is interpreted as 99%, "majority" as 70%, "mixed" as 1/(number of ethnicities), "minority" as 30% and "few" or "some" as 1%.)

== Economy ==
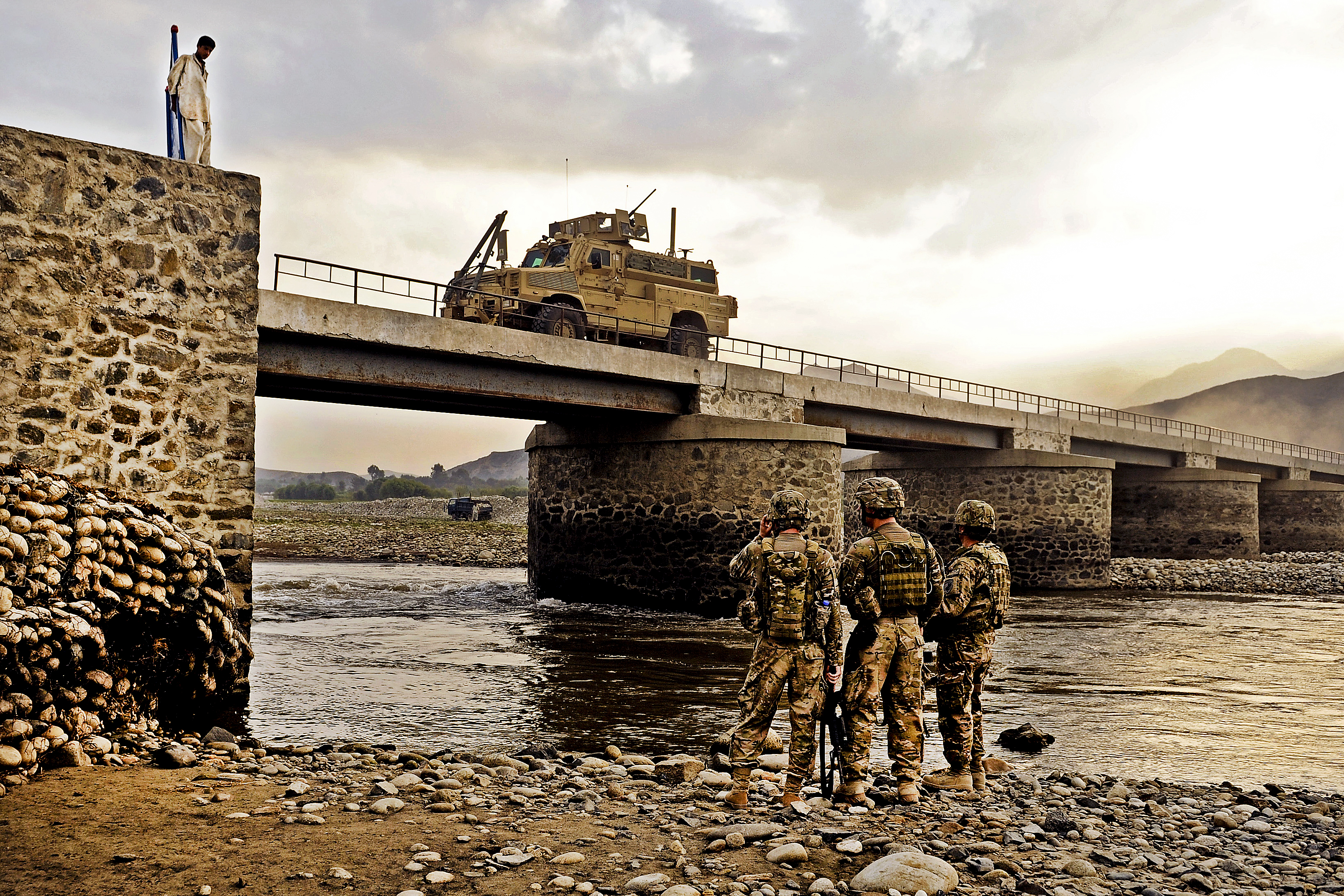
Members of the U.S. Air Force inspecting the underside of a bridge as traffic squeezes through the narrow roadway in Mihtarlam.

=== Agriculture ===
The Alingar and Alishing rivers pass through Laghman, as the province is known for its lushness. Laghman has sizable amounts of irrigated land as one can find scores of fruits and vegetables from Laghman in Kabul. Other main crops in Laghman include rice, wheat and cotton as many people living in the area are involved in agricultural trade and business.

=== Mineral wealth ===
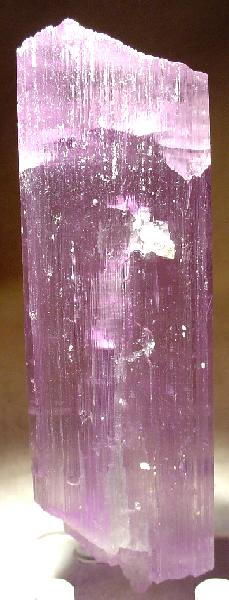
Spodumene mined at Alinghar Pegmatite Field.

Laghman also has an array of precious stones and minerals, as it is well known for being a relatively untapped source of the Tourmaline and Spodumene gemstones which are reported to be in abundance at the northern portions of the province. There are also marble mines.

== Demography ==
=== Population ===
As of 2021, the total population of the province is about 502,148.

=== Ethnicity, languages and religion ===
Laghman is multi-ethnic and mostly a rural society. According to the Naval Postgraduate School, as of 2010 the ethnic groups of the province are as follows: 52.0% Pashtun, 26.7% Pashai and Nuristani (Kata), and 21.7% Tajik. The people of Laghman are overwhelmingly Sunni Muslim.

Laghman has a population of 396,000 people in 2008. The province has 60,048 households, with an average of six persons per home. Rural areas are home to 99 percent of the population. Sapi, Tajik, Nasir, Ibrahimkhail, Hoodkhail, Nuristani, Kharoti, Jabarkhail, Pashai, Niazi, Pashtun, and Gujjars are the major ethnic groupings. Pashto is spoken in 345 of the 620 villages, accounting for about 58 percent of the population. Pashayi languages are the second most common language, spoken by a third of the people in 210 localities. Dari is spoken in 57 localities, accounting for slightly more than 9% of the population. Kochi people (nomads) live in Laghman province, and their numbers fluctuate depending on the season. In the winter, 94,020 people, or around 4% of the Kuchi population, stay in Laghman living in 40 communities.

Estimated ethnolinguistic and -religious composition
Ethnicity	Pashtun	Pashayi	Nuristani	Tajik/ Farsiwan	Others	Sources
Period	Pashtun	Pashayi	Nuristani	Tajik/ Farsiwan	Others	Sources

2004–2021 (Islamic Republic)	50 – 90%	<25 – 33%	∅	<9 – 25%	∅
2020 EU	1st	3rd	–	2nd	–
2018 UN	90% (Note: incl. Abdulrahimzai, Alokozai, Hoodkhel, Jabarkhel, Niazi, Naser, Safi, Sahak, and Tarakhel.)	∅	∅ (Note: incl. Kata.)	∅ (Note: incl. Panjshiri.)	–
2015 CP	58%	33%	–	9%	∅ (Note: incl. Gujar.)
2015 NPS	51.3%	27% (Note: incl. Kata and Ashkun.)		21.3%	∅
2011 PRT	58% (Note: incl. Safi, Naser, Ibrahimkhel, Hoodkhel, Kharoti, Jabarkhel, and Niazi, and excl. Kochi.)	33%	∅	9%	∅ (Note: incl. Gujar.)
2011 USA	58%	∅	∅	–	–
2009 ISW	50%	25%	–	25%	–

Legend:
- ∅: Ethnicity mentioned in source but not quantified
- –: Ethnicity not mentioned specifically
- Source abbreviations: Empirical sources: –, Government sources: CP – Colombo Plan, EU – European Union Agency for Asylum, PRT – Provincial Reconstruction Team of the United States government, UN – United Nations Assistance Mission in Afghanistan, Editorial sources: ISW – Institute for the Study of War, NPS – Naval Postgraduate School, USA – United States Army

=== Education ===
The overall literacy rate (6+ years of age) increased from 14% in 2005 to 26% in 2011. The overall net enrolment rate (6–13 years of age) increased from 48% in 2005 to 52% in 2011.

Universities include:

- Laghman University

=== Health ===
The percentage of households with clean drinking water fell from 39% in 2005 to 34% in 2011. The percentage of births attended to by a skilled birth attendant increased from 3% in 2005 to 36% in 2011. There are 57 medical health clinics and 2 government hospitals.

== Culture ==
=== Places of interest ===
- Qala-e-Seraj
- Hajji Dunya Gul Niazi Jamia Masjid

== Notable people ==
- Haneef Atmar - national security advisor, former Education and Interior Minister
- Hazrat Ali - Afghan military commander and warlord
- Mirwais Azizi - founder and owner of Azizi Bank
- Tariq Shah Bahramee - former Defence Minister
- Mohammad Shafiq Hamdam - writer and political activist
- Abdul Khaliq Hussaini - Former Senator, political activist
- Hafizullah Khaled - humanitarian, peace activist and writer
- Zalmay Khalilzad - statesman, diplomat and businessman
- Abdullah Laghmani - former Deputy Intelligence Officer of Afghanistan
- Isa Khan Laghmani - soldier
- Mangal - singer
- Wafadar Momand - cricketer
- Mohammed Asif Safi - General in Afghan Army during 1970's
- Hafiz Sahar - Editor-in-Chief of Eslah national newspaper in early 1970s, Fulbright Scholar, and Professor of Journalism in Afghanistan and United States.
- Gul Pacha Ulfat - poet and writer
- Abdul Zahir (politician) - prime minister of Afghanistan in early 1970s
- Ahmad Zahir - singer and songwriter
- Salma Niazi - Founder and Editor in Chief The Afghan Times
