= Old Mandarin Islamic Restaurant =

Chinese restaurant in San Francisco

Coordinates: 37°44′18.1″N 122°30′2.5″W

Old Mandarin Islamic Restaurant is a Chinese restaurant in San Francisco's Sunset District that specializes in Uyghur cuisine.

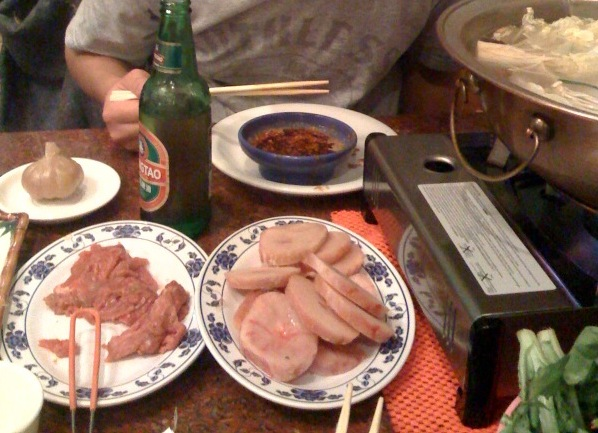
Raw "lamb eggs" at Old Mandarin Islamic Restaurant.

== History ==
The restaurant was opened in 1997 by Xuqun Yang and Feng Wang, a husband and wife who emigrated from Beijing in 1987. At first, they ran the restaurant with their 14-year-old son and one other employee. As of 2015, it was the only Muslim Chinese restaurant in the city, and at the time that it opened, most of its clientele were Muslim. However, their customers became more diverse over time as the restaurant gained publicity from publications like the Michelin Guide.

The restaurant's menu is based on dishes from Uyghur cuisine, such as lamb skewers, beef pancakes, and cracked fish. Beijing cuisine like noodles and hot pot are also served, as well as traditional American Chinese cuisine. It only serves halal food, which is made in accordance with Islamic dietary restrictions. Items like pork and alcohol are not available at the restaurant. It has been noted for the spiciness of many of its dishes.
