= Mirwais Azizi =

Afghan banker

- Born: 1962 (age 63–64); Laghman, Afghanistan
- Education: Kabul University
- Occupations: Founder-chairman of Azizi Groups of UAE-Afghan & Azizi Bank
- Years active: Since 2000 -
- Known for: Founder of Azizi Bank

Mirwais Azizi (born 1962) is a Dubai-based Afghan businessman. He is the chairman of Azizi Group of companies, which he founded in 1989 with a presence in realty, banking, investment, and hospitality. He is also the chairman of Azizi Bank, which he established in 2006 in Kabul, Afghanistan, with $7.5 million in equity capital and has since reached up to $80 million.

Azizi is currently building Burj Azizi, the second-tallest tower in Dubai. He was featured in the list of "Arabian Business 100 Inspiring leaders in the Middle East" in March 2018.

He is regarded by many Afghans as Afghanistan's richest man, who handled as much as 70% of the petroleum products sold in Afghanistan, reported by Asia Sentinel.

== Early life and education ==
Azizi was born in Laghman Province, Afghanistan. He graduated in Law from the University of Kabul. He left Afghanistan in 1988.

== Career ==
In 2007, Azizi established Azizi Developments. A year prior, he founded Azizi Bank, which became one of the largest commercial financial institutions in Afghanistan. He also acquired Bakhtar Bank (now Islamic Bank of Afghanistan) which is one of the fastest growing banks in Afghanistan.

Azizi Developments started selling off-plan properties in Dubai until the 2008 financial crisis. The majority of buyers could not continue payments and Azizi instructed that their deposits be handed back.

In 2013, Azizi Developments resumed the construction of projects. Presently, the company has more than 200 projects under various stages of development with a current portfolio in Dubai valued over AED 45 billion. The Azizi Hotak Group, which he started with an initial investment of $80 million, operates in 10 countries.

He has served on the board of trustees for American University of Afghanistan, the first non-profit higher education institution in Afghanistan.

Azizi owned a number of companies such as Azizi Investments, Azizi Developments, Azizi Bank, Bakhtar Bank (now as Islamic Bank of Afghanistan).

== Personal life ==
He is married to Parigul, with whom he has seven children.
