= Lagemann =

Family name

Lagemann is a German surname and can refer to the following people:

- Alex Lagemann (born 1989), American singer-songwriter
- Ramana Lagemann, an American rally car driver
- Rainer Lagemann, a German metal sculptor and photographer
- Hanns Hermann Lagemann (1924–2003), a German politician (CDU), member of the Landtag of North Rhine-Westphalia
- Inge Lagemann (1944–2014), a German politician (SPD), member of the Landtag of North Rhine-Westphalia
- Johann Jakob Lagemann (1696–1766), a German gunsmith famous for making breech-loading wheellock sporting rifles in Vollmarshausen, Germany
- Sigrid Lagemann (1924–1992), a German actress and voice actress
