= Badpash District =

District of Laghman Province, Afghanistan

Badpash
- Location within Afghanistan
- Coordinates: 34°36′42″N 69°53′51″E
- Country: Afghanistan
- Province: Laghman
- Time zone: UTC+4:30 (Afghanistan)

Badpash District (Pashto: بادپښ ولسوالۍ, Persian: ولسوالی بادپش) is located in Laghman Province of Afghanistan.
