= Vollmarshausen =

Village in Hesse, Germany

Coordinates: 51°16′N 9°34′E

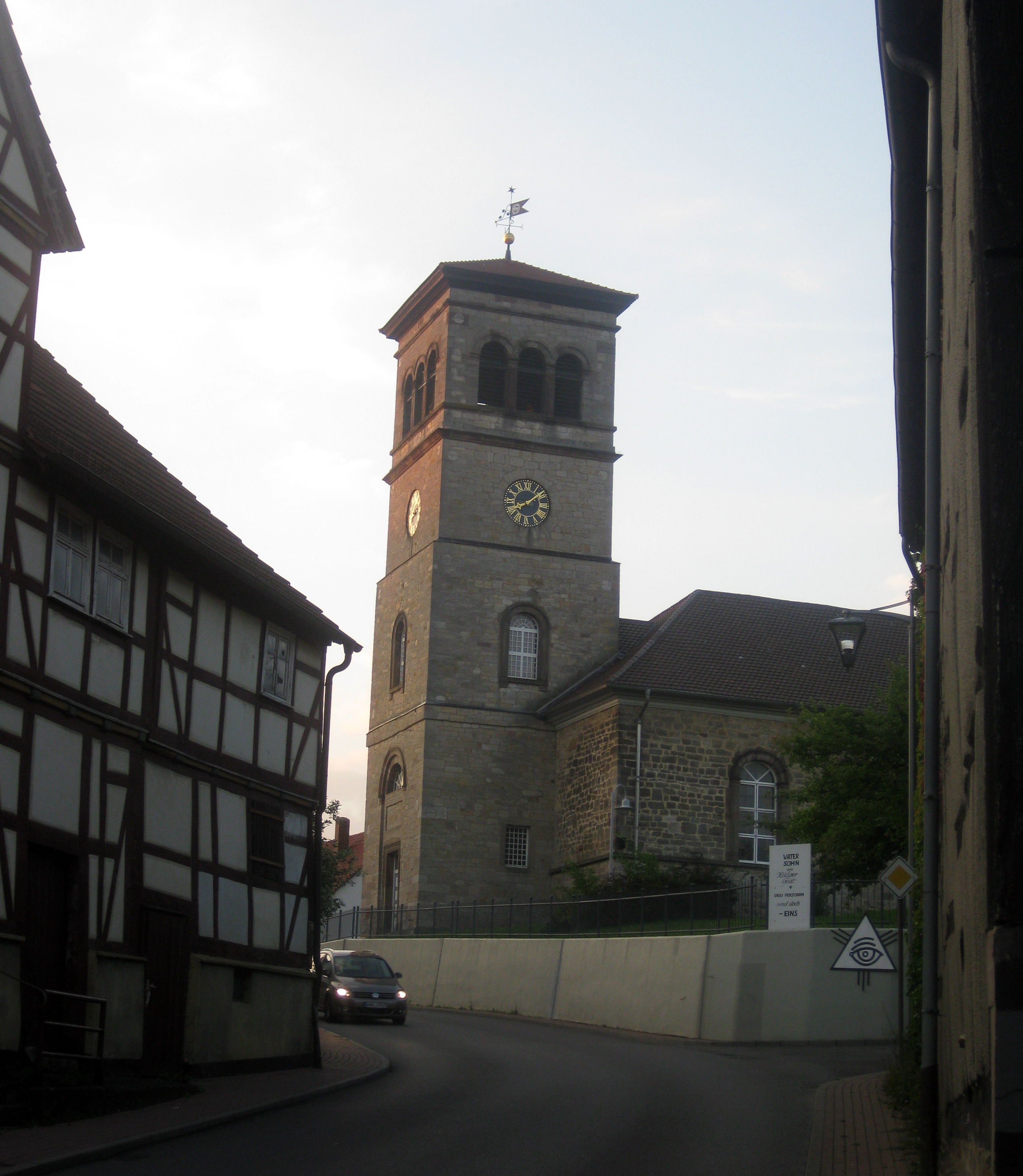
The neoclassic building of the Protestant church of Vollmarshausen

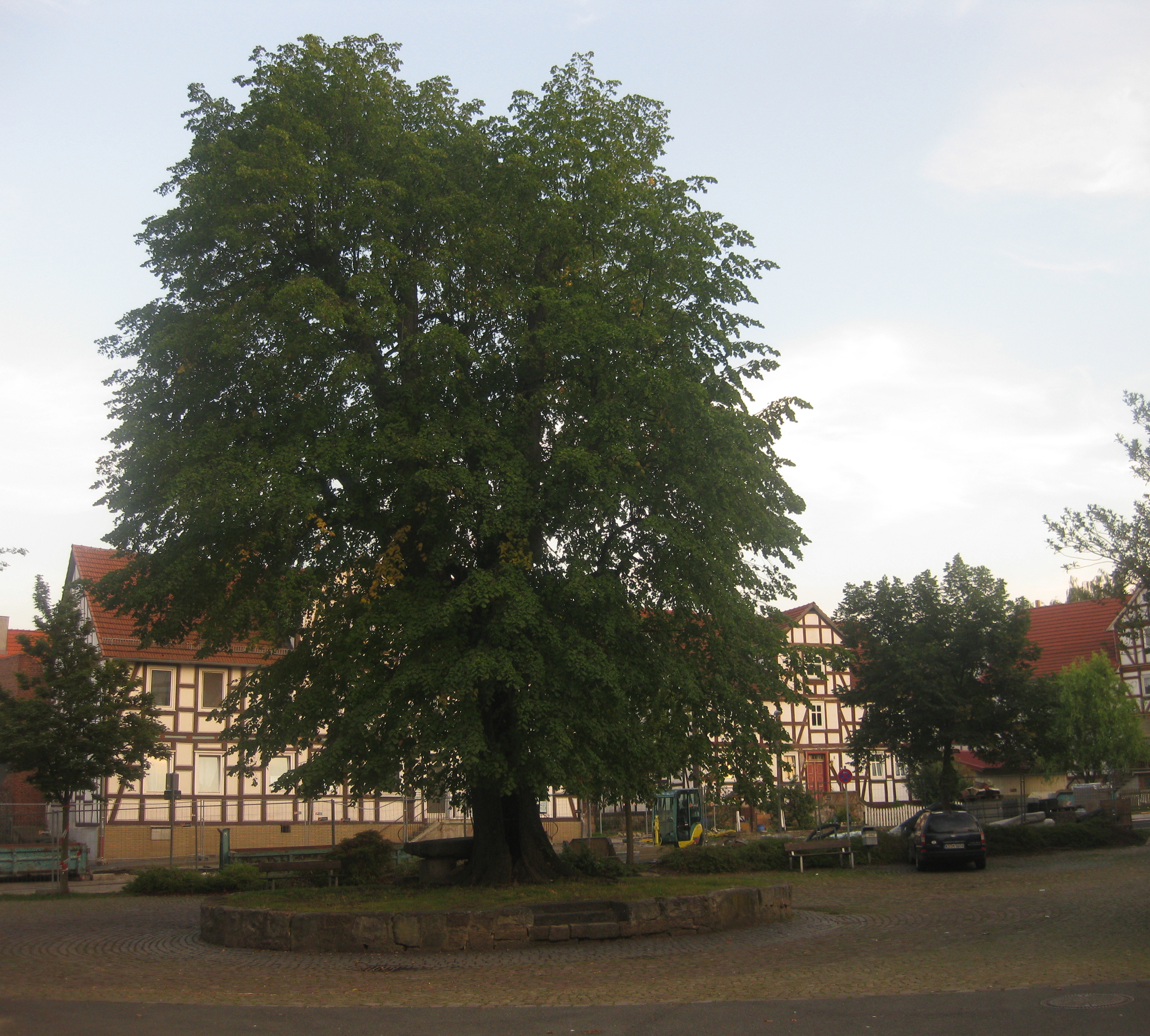
The central square is dominated by the old lime tree of Vollmarshausen

Vollmarshausen is a village of 3000 inhabitants incorporated into the municipality of Lohfelden in Hesse, Germany.

== History ==
The area around Vollmarshausen was settled in the late Bronze Age and early Iron Age (about 1200 to about 650 BC). 1951 a large burial site (with 252 registered graves, all by cremation) was found. It is one of the most important finds from this period in Western Europe. In the 10th and 11th century, the land east of Kassel was given to colonists. In the year 1019 Henry II gave the village to the monastery of Kaufungen. During the Middle Ages until the 19th century Vollmarshausen was a court place, on this place there is the 250-year-old lime tree with an old stone table. For about 200 years, Vollmarshausen was known for breech-loading wheellock sporting rifles (Müller-Büchse) produced by Johann Jakob Lagemann. The old factory (a mill) still exists and is a horse-riding centre today.

From 1835 to 1839, the new Evangelical Church of Vollmarshausen designed by Daniel Engelhard was built. The form follows the language of classicism with influences of a Byzantine Basilica. Liturgical items and the bells were taken from the previous building.

In 1933, the elementary school teacher Ludwig Rüdiger opposed National Socialism; it was a sensation at that time. One year before, the Nazis tried to displace by law the mayor of Vollmarshausen, but without success. Some months later, many people were arrested. During World War II the village had no damage, and to this day the townscape is dominated by old timber-frame houses which are protected as historic monuments. Since 1970, it has been part of Lohfelden.

== Population ==
In 1585, the village had 48 households. In 1747, it had 55.

Year	Inhabitants
1895	1111
1939	1894
1961	2479
1970	2880
