= Jabbarkhel =

Pashtun clan

Jabbarkhel or Jabarkhail, (Pashto: جبارخېل) sometimes spelled JabarKhel or JabarKhyl is a sub tribe of Ahmadzai tribe of Pashtun people and consist of more than fifteen thousand families. Many of the families carry the surname "Jabbar Khel", but some have changed their surnames to the names of their fathers or grandfathers. The tribe is believed to have descended from an Ahmadzai leader named Jabbar. They are believed to have been located primarily in the region of Qabr-i-Jabbar/Khaki Jabbar District. Abdul Rahim Arsala was the son of the leader and descended from that tribe. He was later called on by the king, among the other tribe members, to be members of the military. Jabbar Khel live across the Durand Line. In Pakistan, they live in Masho Gagar, a village on Indus Highway, north of Peshawar, near to Badaber, and in Ghari Jabbar Khel, situated on Grand Trunk road in Pabbi.

There is another Jabar Khel sub-section in the Arghushal clan of Swati tribe living in Hazara but they are different from this tribe.
