= Abdullah Laghmani =

Former Afghan deputy chief of security

Deputy Director of the National Directorate of Security
- In office Unknown – 2 September 2009
- President: Hamid Karzai

Personal details
- Born: ~1960s
- Died: 2 September 2009 Mihtarlam, Laghman Province, Afghanistan

Abdullah Laghmani (1960s –2 September 2009) was Deputy Chief of the National Directorate of Security (NDS) in Afghanistan, and a prominent ally of President Hamid Karzai. He first served as an intelligence officer for the Northern Alliance during Taliban rule. After the formation of Karzai administration in late 2001, Laghmani served as the intelligence chief of Kandahar province before moving up as deputy chief. Laghmani was killed in a Taliban suicide bomb attack in Mehtar Lam, Laghman Province.

An ethnic Tajik, he was particularly knowledgeable about the Taliban and the movement's mentors in Pakistan. He and his agents helped determine a possible link between the bombers who attacked the Indian Embassy in Kabul in July 2008 and the Pakistani intelligence service (ISI) in Peshawar.
