= Isa Khan Laghmani =

- Born: 1987 (age 38–39); Laghman, Afghanistan
- Military career
- Allegiance: Islamic Republic of Afghanistan
- Rank: Staff sergeant
- Unit: Afghanistan National Army

Isa Khan Laghmani (Pashto: عیسی‌خان لغماني, born 1987) is soldier of the Afghanistan National Army. He was called the hero of Afghanistan after he killed 6 suicide attackers alone in the Kabul Parliament attack on June 22, 2015.

== Kabul Parliament attack ==
On June 22, 2015, the Taliban detonated a car bomb outside the National Assembly in Kabul, and Taliban fighters attacked the building with assault rifles and RPGs. A Taliban fighter driving a car loaded with explosives managed to get through security checkpoints before detonating the vehicle outside the parliament's gates. Six Taliban insurgents with AK-47 rifles and RPGs took up positions in a construction site nearby. Members of Parliament were evacuated to safety, while security forces battled the insurgents in a two-hour gun battle. Afghan Interior Ministry spokesman Sediq Sediqqi said all seven attackers were killed by police and no MPs were wounded.

The UN mission in Afghanistan said a woman and a child were killed in the attack, and forty civilians were injured. Taliban spokesman Zabiullah Mujahid claimed responsibility for the attack, saying that it was timed to coincide with a parliamentary speech of the new defense minister Mohammed Masoom Stanekzai. Lieutenant General Abdul Rahman Rahimi, Kabul's Chief of Police, said that the police will investigate how the attackers got so close to parliament.

=== Killing of 6 attackers ===
Afghan National Army staff sergeant Isa Khan Laghmani is believed to have killed three insurgents attempting to storm the parliament in the attack.

=== President and chief executive officer awards ===
He was praised by Mohammad Ashraf Ghani for his actions. Posters with Khan's face have appeared in the capital, in what has been described as a "rare spontaneous show of support" for the country's security forces.

== See also ==
- War in Afghanistan (2015–2021)
