= Lagman (surname) =

Lagman is a surname. Notable people with the surname include:

- Edcel Lagman (1942–2025), Filipino human rights lawyer and politician
- Edcel Greco Lagman (born 1972), Filipino lawyer and politician, son of Edcel Sr.
- Fabian Lagman (born 1962), Argentine footballer
- Filemon Lagman (1953–2001), Filipino communist and trade unionist
- Krisel Lagman (born 1968), Filipino politician, daughter of Edcel Sr.
- Michael Odylon Lagman Romero (born 1972), Filipino businessman, politician, philanthropist, military reservist, and sportsman

== See also ==
- Layman (surname)
