= Lamian =

Chinese noodle dish

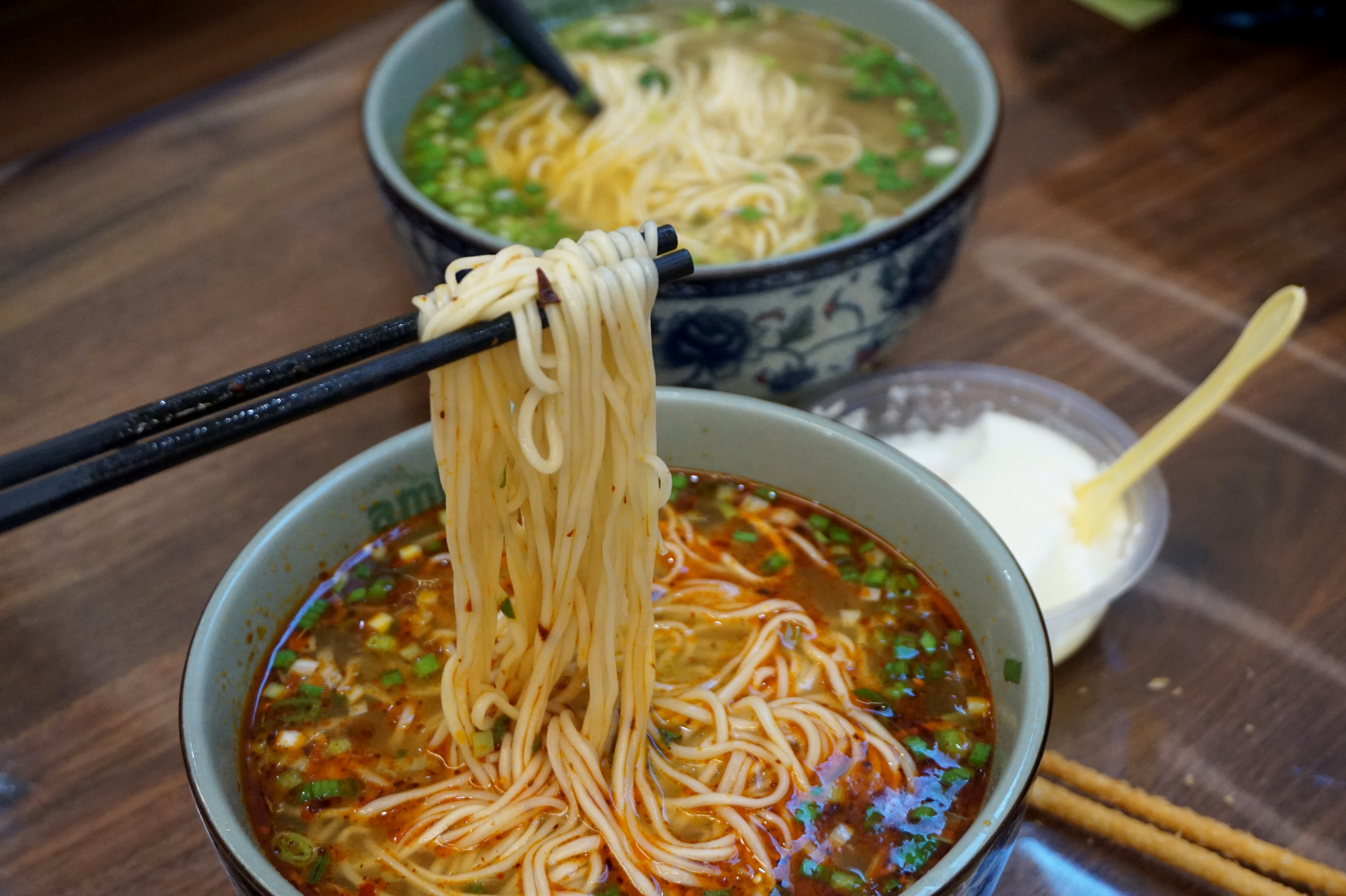
- Lanzhou-style beef lamian
- Alternative names: Shuaimian (甩麵), chemian (扯麵), chenmian (抻麵)
- Type: Chinese noodles
- Place of origin: China
- Region or state: East Asia
- Serving temperature: Hot
- Main ingredients: Wheat noodles, meat-based broth, vegetables or meat
- Variations: Tangmian (湯麵), chaomian (炒麵), daoxiaomian (刀削麵)

Lamian
- Traditional Chinese: 拉麵
- Simplified Chinese: 拉面
- Hanyu Pinyin: lāmiàn
- Literal meaning: Pulled noodle
Transcriptions
Standard Mandarin
- Hanyu Pinyin: lāmiàn
- Wade–Giles: la1 mien4
- IPA: [lá.mjɛ̂n]
other Mandarin
- Dungan: Ламян
Yue: Cantonese
- Jyutping: laai1 min6
Southern Min
- Hokkien POJ: la-mī

Lamian (traditional Chinese: 拉麵; simplified Chinese: 拉面; pinyin: Lāmiàn; 'pulled noodles') is a type of soft wheat flour handmade Chinese noodle that is particularly common in northern China. Lamian is made by twisting, stretching and folding the dough into strands, using the weight of the dough. The length and thickness of the strands depends on the number of times the dough is folded.

== History ==
The unique method of making lamian noodles originated in China. The earliest description of making lamian noodles with the pulling technique is found in the Songshi Yangsheng Bu (宋氏養生部), a dietary manual written in 1504 by Song Xu (宋詡), an agriculturalist and gastronomer of the Ming dynasty.

Though the Japanese Chinese dish ramen (ラーメン, rāmen) does not derive from lamian, the name is known to be a borrowing; it remains unclear how ramen ended up with that name. The Korean variety of instant noodles, ramyeon (라면), derives its name from the Japanese, and therefore also has its roots in the name lāmiàn.

== Description ==
Part of the preparation in which the dough is pulled into strands

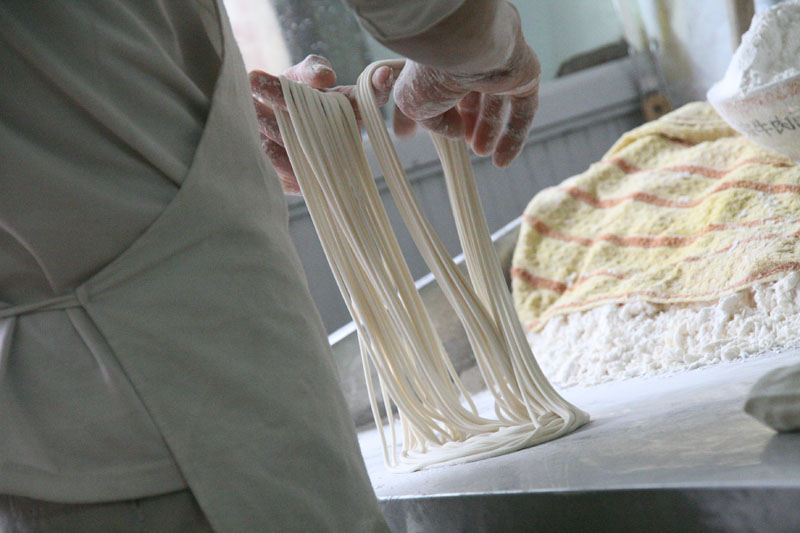
Lanzhou lamian after repeated stretching

The hand-making process involves taking a lump of dough and repeatedly stretching it to produce many strands of thin, long noodle. Literally, lā, (拉) means 'to pull' or 'to stretch', while miàn (traditional Chinese: 麵; simplified Chinese: 面) means 'noodle'.

There are several styles of twisting the dough but they all employ the same concept: a piece of soft wheat dough is repeatedly stretched and folded onto itself in order to align the glutens and warm up the dough for stretching. Then it is rolled out to a workable thickness and cut into workable portions. The end pieces of the starting dough are never used because the glutens are not as aligned as the middle pieces.

This dough is then pulled to about an arm span's length. The puller then makes a loop with the dough, joining the two ends into one clump of dough and inserts his fingers into the loop to keep the strand from sticking to itself. Doing this, the pull has doubled the length of the dough while fractioning its thickness. This process is repeated several times until the desired thickness and quantity is achieved. Some pullers dip the strands into flour between stretching phases to keep them separated. When flour is used, there generally is a final slap of noodles against the prep board to remove excess flour.

In the Lanzhou style, the dough is worked aggressively. It is pulled in straight, quick, tugs with no twisting or waving. Some pullers regularly slam the noodle against their prep boards to ensure even stretching and uniform thickness. Flour is sometimes used to dust the strands and prevent sticking.

In the Beijing style of preparation, the dough is twisted, stretched delicately by waving the arms and body, untwisted, looped to double the strands and then repeated. When stretching, they coordinate waving their torso and arms to increase the potential length of the noodle beyond that of the puller's arm span. Flour dusting is more liberally employed in this style than in the Lanzhou style of preparation.

There is also another style, in which the noodle maker stretches one thick, flat strand of dough between two hands. This is usually done for show and involves the puller twirling and spinning much like Chinese ribbon dancing.

== Usage ==
Dishes using lamian are usually served in a beef-flavored soup called tangmian (Chinese: 湯麵; pinyin: Tāngmiàn, literally 'soup noodles'). However, they are sometimes stir-fried and served with a sauce as a dish called chaomian (Chinese: 炒麵; pinyin: Chǎomiàn, literally 'stir-fried noodles'). This word is etymologically related to chow mein though the dish itself is different.

== Region ==
=== China ===
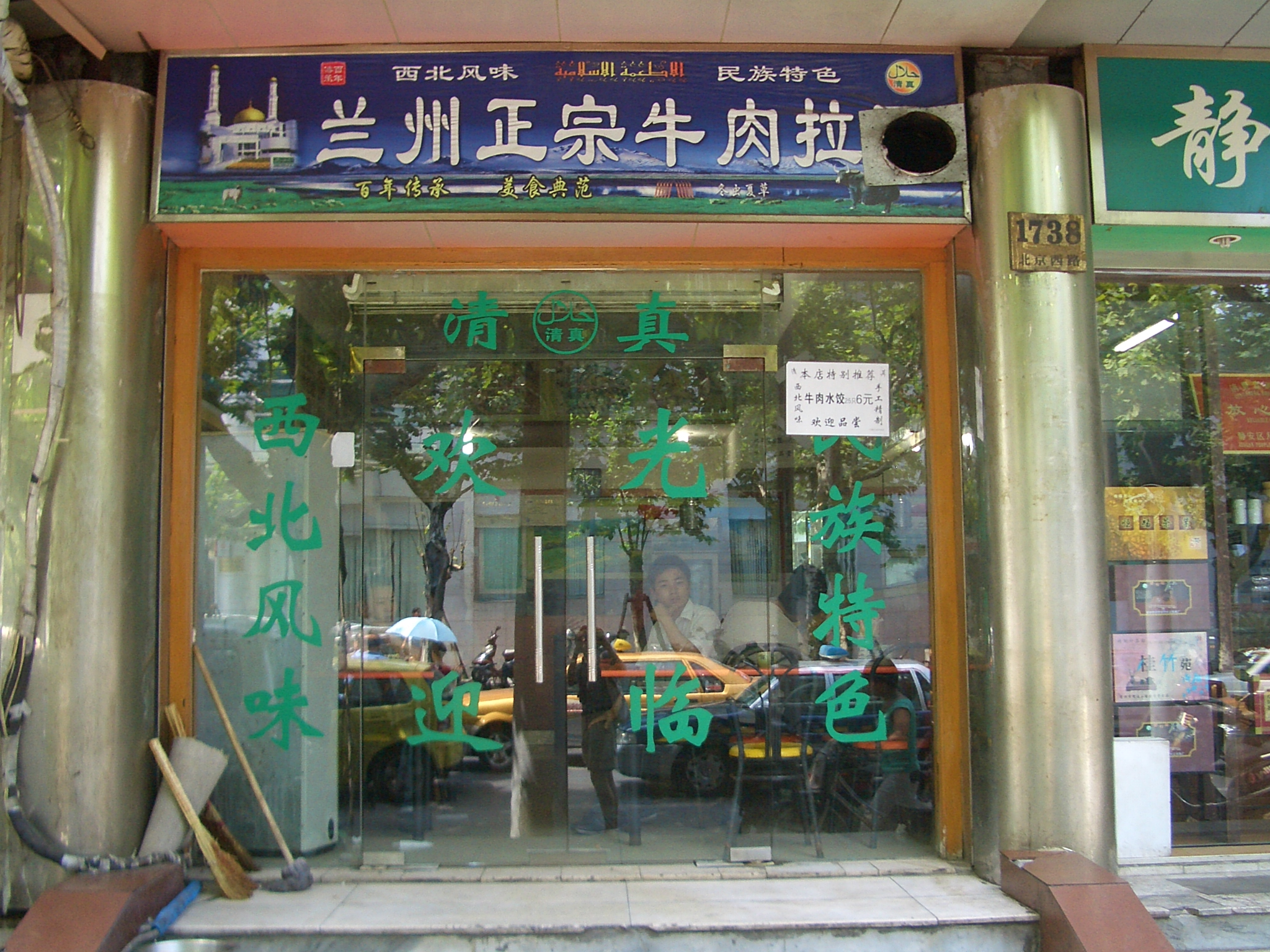
A halal Lanzhou lamian restaurant in Shanghai

Small restaurants serving Lanzhou-style lamian are very common throughout Western China where they have formed a staple diet for centuries, as well as Eastern Chinese cities. They tend to serve a variety of low cost meals, with a choice of lamian, knife-cut noodles and perhaps Xi'an-style paomo (steamed bread dipped in soup). Noodles may be served with beef or mutton, either in soup or stir-fried. Lamian can also be served cold with salad ingredients such as shredded cucumber and tomato to make a refreshing summer dish.

Most of the lamian restaurants in China are owned by Hui ethnic families from Northwestern China and serve only halal food (thus no pork dishes). Lamian restaurants are the most common halal restaurants in Eastern China.

Another typical variety of lamian is Shandong lamian, produced in Yantai, Shandong Province.

=== United States ===
In New York's Manhattan and Sunset Park Chinatowns, lamian restaurants are a common sight. Most are run by Fuzhounese, some featuring knife-cut noodles, but most featuring only the hand-pulled versions. In Manhattan Chinatown, most are located in the Fuzhounese area of Chinatown east of Bowery, while in Sunset Park, sometimes referred to as Fuzhou Town, they are scattered along the 8th Avenue strip.

=== Philippines ===
Filipino Chinatown restaurants serve lamian, which somewhat resembles the popular local pancit canton of Filipino cuisine.

=== Germany ===
Munich and Frankfurt am Main have Chinese restaurants specialized in serving lamian, located near their respective main train stations.

== See also ==
- Chinese noodles
- Lo mein
- Laghman
- Laksa
- Ramen
- Lanzhou beef noodle soup
- Jajangmyeon
