= Azizi Bank =

Commercial bank in Afghanistan

- Native name: ‍عزیزی بانک
- Type: Private
- Founded: June 2006
- Headquarters: Wazir Akbar Khan, Kabul, Afghanistan
- Key people: Mirwais Azizi
- Number of employees: 1,326
- Website: www.azizibank.af

Azizi Bank is one of the largest commercial banks in Afghanistan. It has 56 branches including extension counters and around 88 automated teller machines across Afghanistan. The bank opened on June 13, 2006, and is headquartered in the Wazir Akbar Khan neighborhood of Kabul, Afghanistan. Mirwais Azizi is the founder and chairman of the bank.

Azizi Bank currently has around 1,326 employees, 12% of whom are females. During the 2021 Taliban offensive, some members of the Taliban escorted female employees of Azizi Bank in Kandahar and ordered them not to return to work.

== Farhad Azizi ==
Farhad Azizi is a UAE based businessman, billionaire, investor, entrepreneur and the CEO of Azizi developments. He is the chairman of Azizi Bank, one of the largest commercial banks in Afghanistan, which he established in 2006 with $7.5 million in equity capital and has since reached up to $80 million. He is the CEO of Azizi Group of companies which was founded in 1989 with a presence in realty, banking, investment, and hospitality.

As of 2018, he was arguably the richest person and family of Afghani origin. He featured in the list of "Arabian Business as one of the 100 Inspiring leaders in the Middle East" in March 2018. He is regarded as one of the richest people of Afghanistan with a monopoly in petroleum products. Azizi Developments is a Dubai-based property developer.

=== Early life ===
After moving from Afghanistan to Dubai as a young boy along with his father Mirwais Azizi, they founded the Azizi Group in 1989.

A graduate of the University of Tulsa, Azizi obtained an MBA in finance management from Boston-Suffolk University. After completing his studies, Farhad spent time in Europe before moving back to the UAE.

=== Career ===
In 2007, Azizi Developments was established. In 2006, Azizi Bank was found, now the largest commercial financial institution in Afghanistan. They also acquired Bakhtar Bank (now Islamic Bank of Afghanistan) which is regarded as one of the reputed banks in Afghanistan.

Before the 2008 financial crisis and Dubai housing crash in 2009, Azizi Developments sold off-plan properties in Dubai. The majority of buyers could not continue payments and Azizi instructed that their deposits be handed back.

In 2013, Azizi Developments resumed the construction of projects. Presently, the company has more than 200 projects under various stages of development with a current portfolio in Dubai valued over AED 45 billion. His petroleum business Azizi Hotak Group, which was started with an initial investment of $80 million, operates in 10 countries.

=== Companies ===
List of companies/organizations owned by Azizi;

- Azizi Hotak General Trading Group
- Azizi Investments
- Azizi Developments
- Azizi Bank
- Bakhtar Bank (now as Islamic Bank of Afghanistan)
- Azizi Hospitality
- Azizi Foundation

== See also ==
- List of companies of Afghanistan
