= Laghman (food) =

Uyghur noodle dish

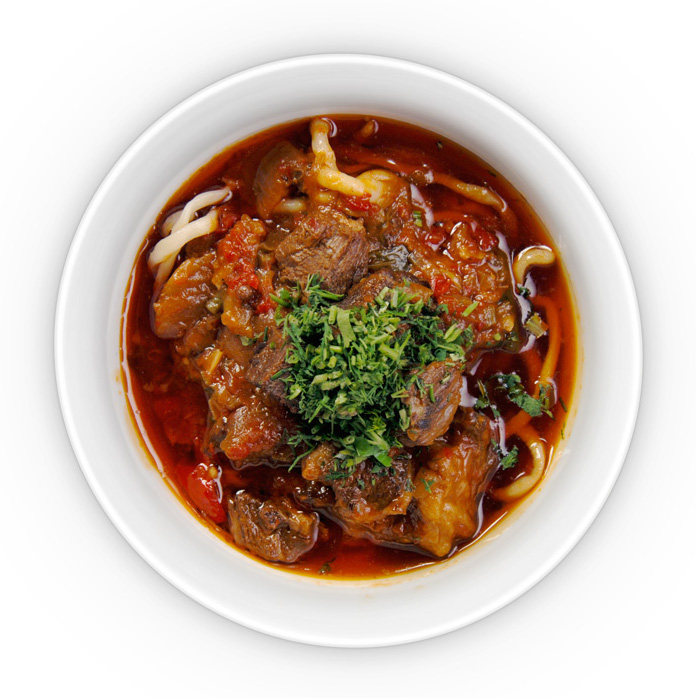
- Uzbek lagʻmon in Tashkent
- Alternative names: lagman, lagʻmon, latiaozi
- Type: Noodle soup
- Place of origin: Xinjiang
- Region or state: Central Asia
- Serving temperature: Hot
- Main ingredients: noodles, meat broth, beef or lamb

Laghman
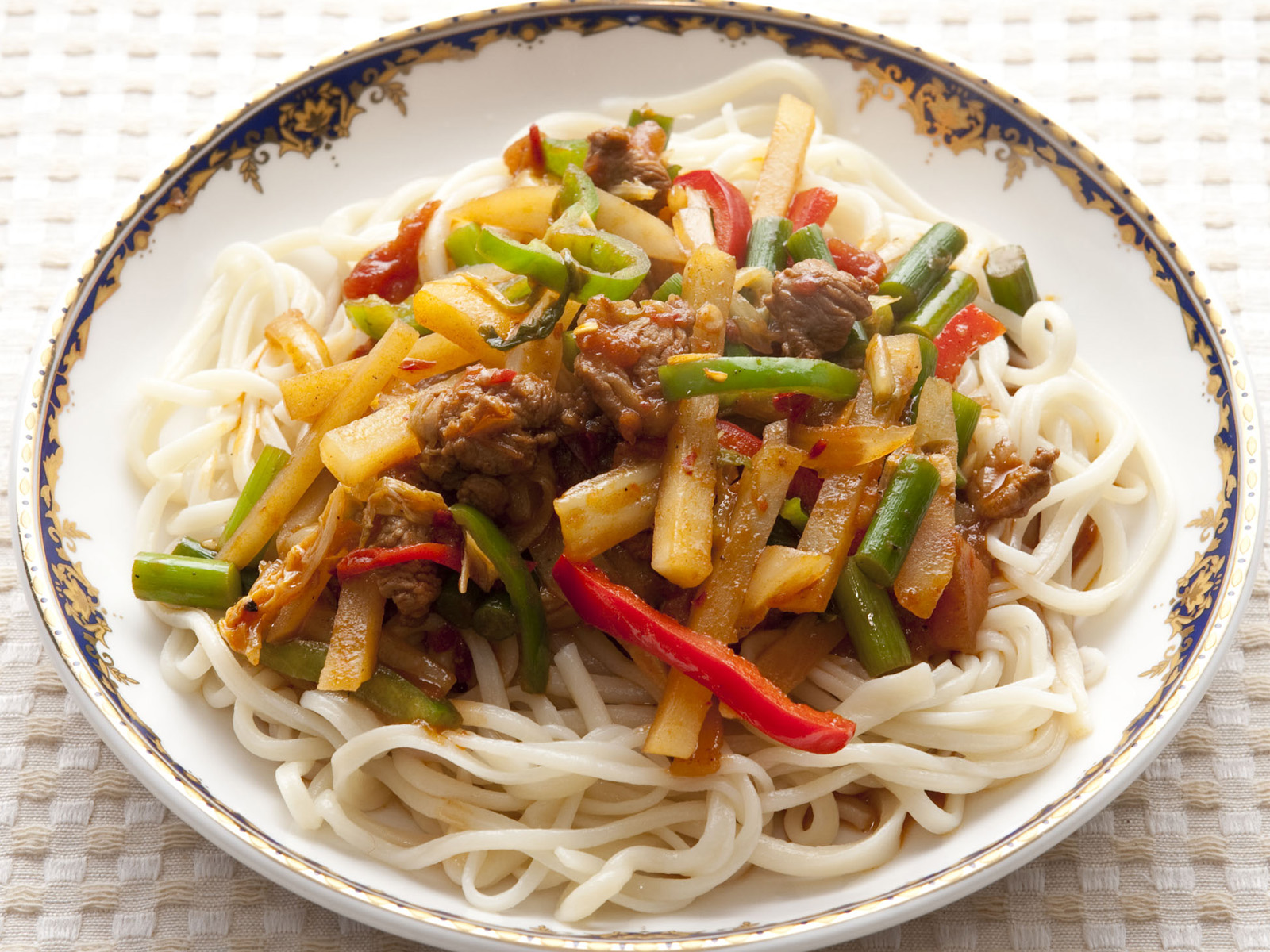
- Laghman served at a Uyghur restaurant in Tokyo

Uyghur name
- Uyghur: لەغمەن
Transcriptions
- Latin Yëziqi: leghmen
- Yengi Yeziⱪ: ləƣmən
- SASM/GNC: läĝmän
- Siril Yëziqi: ләғмән

Chinese name
- Simplified Chinese: 拉条子
- Traditional Chinese: 拉條子
Transcriptions
Standard Mandarin
- Hanyu Pinyin: lātiáozǐ
other Mandarin
- Dungan: латёзы

Alternative Chinese name
- Simplified Chinese: 拌面
- Traditional Chinese: 拌麵
- Literal meaning: mixed noodles
Transcriptions
Standard Mandarin
- Hanyu Pinyin: bànmiàn
other Mandarin
- Dungan: банмян

Uzbek name
- Uzbek: لەغمون / лағмон / lagʻmon

Kazakh name
- Kazakh: لاعمان / лағман / lağman

Kyrgyz name
- Kyrgyz: لاگمان / лагман / lagman

Laghman (Uyghur: لەغمەن, romanized: leghmen), also spelled lagman, is a dish of meat, vegetables and pulled noodles from Uyghur cuisine. In Chinese, the noodle is known as latiaozi (Chinese: 拉条子) or banmian (Chinese: 拌面).

Laghman is likely a loanword from the Chinese lamian and appears to be an adaptation of Northern Chinese noodle dishes, although its taste and preparation are distinctly Uyghur.

It is well known in Kazakhstan and Kyrgyzstan, where it is considered a national dish of the local Uyghur and Dungan (Hui) ethnic minorities. It is also common in Russia, Uzbekistan, Tajikistan, Turkmenistan, northeastern Afghanistan (where chickpeas are added), and parts of northern Pakistan. Crimean Tatar cuisine also adopted lagman from Uzbek culture.

== Cooking ==
Laghman is prepared with meat (mainly lamb or beef), vegetables and pulled long noodles. The vegetables usually include bell peppers, celery, garlic, onions, and spices.

== See also ==
- Cellophane noodles
- List of noodle dishes
- Lamian
- Lo mein
- Ramen
