= Kafiristan =

Historical region of Afghanistan

Kafiristan کافرستان
- Historical region of Afghanistan & Pakistan
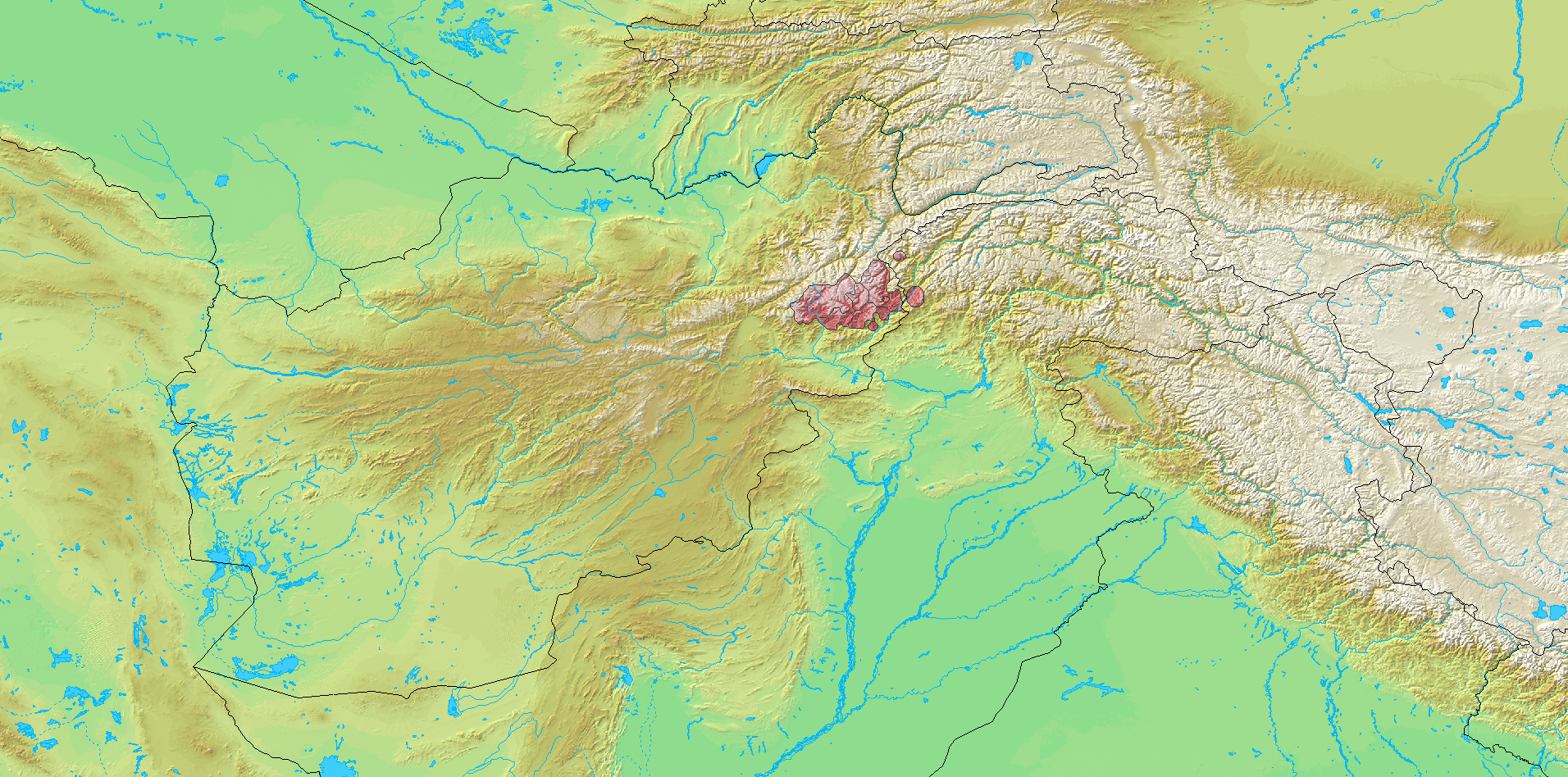
- The Kafiristan region, located in the southern range of Hindu Kush

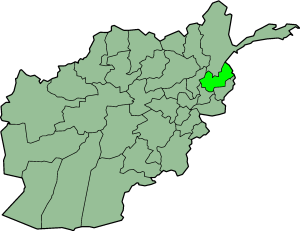
- Map showing present-day Nuristan Province of Afghanistan
- Country: Afghanistan

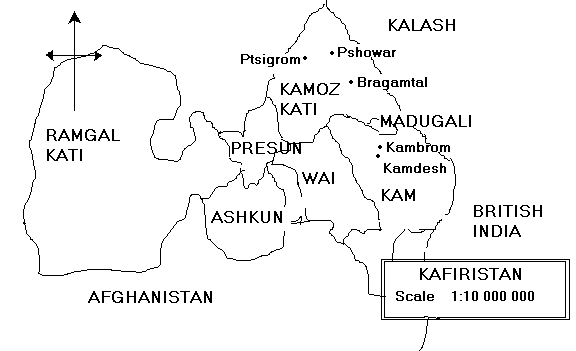
Map of Kafiristan prior to its conversion to Islam in 1890s

Kāfiristān, or Kāfirstān (Pashto: کاپیرستان; Dari: کافرستان; lit. 'Land of Infidels'), is a historical region that covered present-day Nuristan Province in Afghanistan and its surroundings. This historic region lies on, and mainly comprises, the basins of the rivers Alingar, Pech (Kamah), Landai Sin and Kunar, and the intervening mountain ranges. It is bounded by the main range of the Hindu Kush on the north, Pakistan's Chitral District to the east, the Kunar Valley in the south and the Alishang River in the west.

Kafiristan took its name from the enduring kafir (non-Muslim) Nuristani inhabitants who once practised what authors consider as a form of animism and ancestor worship (Note: See Kalash People, Note on animism and ancestor worship.) with elements of Indo-Iranian (Vedic- or Hindu-like) religion; (Note: See Kalash people, Note on Indo-Iranian religion.) they were thus known to the surrounding predominantly Sunni Muslim population as Kafirs, meaning "disbelievers" or "infidels". They are closely related to the Kalash people, an independent people with a distinctive culture, language and religion, who reside in the Chitral District of the Khyber-Pakhtunkhwa province of Pakistan.

The area extending from modern Nuristan to Kashmir was part of a wider cultural area called "Kafiristan" in contemporary Islamic sources, containing a host of "Kafir" cultures and Indo-European languages that became Islamized over a long period of time, which eventually led them to become Muslim on the orders of Emir Abdur Rahman Khan who conquered the territory in 1895–96. The region was earlier surrounded by Buddhist states that temporarily brought literacy and state rule to the mountains; the decline of Buddhism heavily isolated the region. It was surrounded by Muslim states in the 16th century. In the scientific literature, the term "Peristan" has been applied to this region.

== Etymology ==
Kafiristan or Kafirstan is normally taken to mean "land [-stan] of the kafirs" in the Persian language, where the name کافر kafir is derived from كافر kāfir, literally meaning a person who refuses to accept a principle of any nature and figuratively as a person refusing to accept Islam as his faith; it is commonly translated into English as a "non-believer". However, the influence from district names in Kafiristan of Katwar or Kator and the ethnic name Kati has also been suggested. Kafiristan was inhabited by people who followed a form of Paganism before their conversion to Islam in 1895–1896.

== History of Kafiristan ==
=== Ancient history ===
Ancient Kapiśa janapada, located south-east of the Hindukush, included and is related to Kafiristan. The Chinese pilgrim Xuanzang who visited Kapisa in 644 AD calls it Kai-pi-shi(h) (迦畢試; standard Chinese: Jiābìshì < Middle Chinese ZS: *kɨɑ-piɪt̚-ɕɨ^{H}). Xuanzang describes Kai-pi-shi as a flourishing kingdom ruled by a Buddhist kshatriya king holding sway over ten neighbouring states, including Lampaka, Nagarahara, Gandhara and Bannu. Until the 9th century AD, Kapiśi remained the second capital of the Shahi dynasty of Kabul. Kapiśa was known for goats and their skin. Xuanzang talks of Shen breed of horses from Kapiśa (Kai-pi-shi). There is also a reference to Chinese emperor Taizong being presented with an excellent breed of horses in 637 AD by an envoy from Chi-pin (Kapisa). Further evidence from Xuanzang shows that Kai-pi-shi produced a variety of cereals, many kinds of fruits, and a scented root called yu-kin, probably of the grass khus, or vetiver. The people used woollen and fur clothes; also gold, silver and copper coins. Objects of merchandise from all parts were found here.

=== Medieval history ===
Kafiristan proper from west to east comprises basins of Alishang, Alingar, Pech or Prasun, Waigal and Bashgal. The region became a refuge of an old group of Indo-European people, probably mixed with an older substratum, as well as a refuge of a distinct Kafiri group of Indo-Iranian languages, forming part of the wider Dardic languages. The inhabitants were known as "kafirs" due to their enduring paganism, while other regions around them became Muslim. However, the influence from district names in Kafiristan of Katwar or Kator and the ethnic name Kati has also been suggested. The Kafirs were divided into Siyah-Posh, comprising five sub-tribes who spoke the Kamkata-vari language; while the others were called Safed-Posh, comprising Prasungeli, Waigeli, Wamai and Ashkun.

The Kafirs called themselves "Balor", a term that appeared in Chinese sources as early as the fifth century AD. In both the Chinese sources and Muslim sources like the 16th-century work of Kashmir's conqueror Mirza Muhammad Haidar Dughlat, the terms "Bolor" and "Boloristan" denote the area from the Kabul valley to Kashmir, Yarkand and Kashgar. The country is the most inaccessible part of Hindu Kush. The Muslim conquerors could not achieve a lasting success here.

The vast area extending from modern Nuristan to Kashmir contained a host of "Kafir" cultures and Indo-European languages that became Islamized over a long period. Earlier, it was surrounded by Buddhist areas. The Islamization of the nearby Badakhshan began in the 8th century and Kafiristan was completely surrounded by Muslim states in the 16th century with the Islamization of Baltistan. The Buddhist states temporarily brought literacy and state rule into the region. The decline of Buddhism resulted in it becoming heavily isolated.

There have been varying theories about the origins of the Kafirs. Oral traditions of some Nuristanis place themselves to be at confluence of Kabul and Kunar River a millennium ago, being driven off from Kandahar to Kabul to Kapisa to Kama with the Muslim invasion. They identify themselves as late arrivals here, being driven by Mahmud of Ghazni, who after establishing his empire, forced the unsubmissive population to flee. George Scott Robertson considered them to be part of the old Indian population of Eastern Afghanistan and stated that they fled to the mountains while refusing to convert to Islam after the Muslim invasion in the 10th century. The name Kator was used by Lagaturman, the last king of the Turk Shahi. The title "Shah Kator" was assumed by Chitral's ruler Mohtaram Shah who assumed it upon being impressed by the majesty of the erstwhile pagan rulers of Chitral. The theory of Kators being related to the Turki Shahis is based on the information of Jami- ut-Tawarikh and Tarikh-i-Binakiti. The region was also named after its ruling elite. The royal usage may be the origin behind the name of Kator.

=== Ghaznavids era ===
Another jihad against idolatry was at length resolved on; and Mahmud led the seventh one against Nardain, the then boundary of India, or the eastern part of the Hindu Kush; separating, as Ferishta says, the countries of Hindustan and Turkistan and remarkable for its excellent fruit. The country into which the army of Ghazni marched appears to have been the same as that now called Kafirstan, where the inhabitants were and still are, idolaters and are named the Siah-Posh, or black-vested, by the Muslims of later times. In Nardain there was a temple, which the army of Ghazni destroyed; and brought from thence a stone covered with certain inscriptions, which were according to the Hindus, of great antiquity.

=== Early modern and later history ===
The first European recorded as having visited Kafiristan was the Portuguese Jesuit missionary Bento de Góis, SJ. By his account, he visited a city named "Capherstam" in 1602, during the course of a journey from Lahore to China.

American adventurer Colonel Alexander Gardner claimed to have visited Kafiristan twice, in 1826 and 1828. On the first occasion, Dost Mohammad, the amir of Kabul, killed members of Gardner's delegation in Afghanistan and forced him to flee from Kabul to Yarkand through west Kafiristan. On his second visit, Gardner briefly sojourned in northern Kafiristan and the Kunar Valley while returning from Yarkand.

In 1883, William Watts McNair, a British surveyor on leave, explored the area disguised as a hakim. He reported on the journey later that year to the Royal Geographical Society.

George Scott Robertson, medical officer during the Second Anglo-Afghan War and later British political officer in the princely state of Chitral, was given permission to explore the country of the Kafirs in 1890–91. He was the last outsider to visit the area and observe these people's polytheistic culture before their conversion to Islam. Robertson's 1896 account was entitled The Kafirs of the Hindu Kush. Though some sub-groups such as the Kom paid tribute to Chitral, the majority of Kafiristan was left on the Afghan side of the frontier in 1893, when large areas of tribal lands between Afghanistan and British India were divided into zones of control by the Durand Line.

The territory between Afghanistan and British India was demarcated between 1894 and 1896. Part of the frontier lying between Nawa Kotal in the outskirts of Mohmand country and Bashgal Valley on the outskirts of Kafiristan was demarcated by 1895 in an agreement reached on 9 April 1895. Emir Abdur Rahman Khan wanted to force every community and tribal confederation to accept his single interpretation of Islam due to it being the only uniting factor. After the subjugation of Hazaras, Kafiristan was the last remaining autonomous part.

Abdur Rahman Khan's forces invaded Kafiristan in the winter of 1895–96 and captured it in 40 days according to his autobiography. Columns invaded it from the west through Panjshir to Kullum, the strongest fort of the region. The columns from the north came through Badakhshan and from the east through Asmar. A small column also came from south-west through Laghman. The Kafirs were resettled in Laghman while the region was settled by veteran soldiers and other Afghans. The Kafirs were converted and some also converted to avoid the jizya.

A few years after Robertson's visit, in 1895–96, Abdur Rahman Khan invaded and converted the Kafirs to Islam as a symbolic climax to his campaigns to bring the country under a centralised Afghan government. He had similarly subjugated the Hazara people in 1892–93. In 1896 Abdur Rahman Khan, who had thus conquered the region for Islam, renamed the people the Nuristani ("Enlightened Ones" in Persian) and the land as Nuristan ("Land of the Enlightened").

Kafiristan was full of steep and wooded valleys. It was famous for its precise wood carving, especially of cedar-wood pillars, carved doors, furniture (including "horn chairs") and statuary. Some of these pillars survive, as they were reused in mosques, but temples, shrines, and centers of local cults, with their wooden effigies and multitudes of ancestor figures were torched and burnt to the ground. Only a small fraction brought back to Kabul as spoils of this Islamic victory over infidels. These consisted of various wooden effigies of ancestral heroes and pre-Islamic commemorative chairs. Of the more than thirty wooden figures brought to Kabul in 1896 or shortly thereafter, fourteen went to the Kabul Museum and four to the Musée Guimet and the Musée de l'Homme located in Paris. Those in the Kabul Museum were badly damaged under the Taliban but have since been restored. Their last cultural and religious activities just before their forced conversion were however recorded by the Westerners.

A few hundred Kati Kafirs, known as the "Red Kafirs" of the Bashgal Valley, fled across the border into Chitral but, uprooted from their homeland, they converted by the 1930s. They settled near the frontier in the valleys of Rumbur, Bumburet and Urtsun, which were then inhabited by the Kalash tribe or the Black Kafirs. Only this group in the five valleys of Birir, Bumburet, Rumbur, Jineret and Urtsun escaped conversion, because they were located east of the Durand Line in the princely state of Chitral. However, by the 1940s the southern valleys of Urtsun and Jingeret had been converted. After a decline in population caused by forced conversion in the 1970s, this region of Kafiristan in Pakistan, known as Kalasha Desh, has recently shown an increase in its population.

In early 1991, the Republic of Afghanistan government recognized the de facto autonomy of Nuristan and created a new province of that name from districts of Kunar Province and Laghman Province.

== Appearances in culture ==
- Kafiristan is the setting of most of Rudyard Kipling's famous 1888 novella "The Man Who Would Be King". It was adapted into the 1975 film of the same name.
- English travel writer Eric Newby's 1958 A Short Walk in the Hindu Kush describes the adventures of himself and Hugh Carless in Nuristan and their attempt at the then-unprecedented feat of scaling the Mir Samir mountain.
- German author Herbert Kranz chose Kafiristan as the setting of his 1953 adventure novel In den Klauen des Ungenannten: Abenteuer in den Schluchten des Hindukusch.
- The Journey to Kafiristan is a German film by Donatello Dubini and Fosco Dubini recounting an overland journey by Annemarie Schwarzenbach and Ella Maillart from Geneva to Kabul.
- Umberto Eco mentions Kafiristan (as "Kefiristan") in "How to Travel with a Salmon", where a bellboy spoke a dialect that was last heard in Kafiristan at the time of Alexander the Great.
- Nile, an American death metal band, wrote the song "Kafir" for their album Those Whom the Gods Detest which was inspired by Kafiristan.
- In the novels based on Doom written by Dafydd ab Hugh and Brad Linaweaver, and were published between June 1995 and January 1996, there is country called Kefiristan.
- Kafiristan is the setting of the Madeleine Brent novel Stormswift.
- Kafiristan was cited in Season 5 Episode 4 of the hit show Hot in Cleveland as the destination where Victoria's husband, Emmett, is hiding away.

== See also ==
- Nuristan Province
- Chiliss, an ancient people
- Kalash people
- Chitral Kalasha language
- Kho people
- Khowar language
- Nuristanis
- Nuristani languages
- Pashayi people
- Pashayi languages
- Shina people
- Shina language
