= Qarghayi District =

District of Laghman Province

Coordinates: 34.5079°N 70.2137°E

Qarghayi District د قرغیو ولسوالۍ
- District
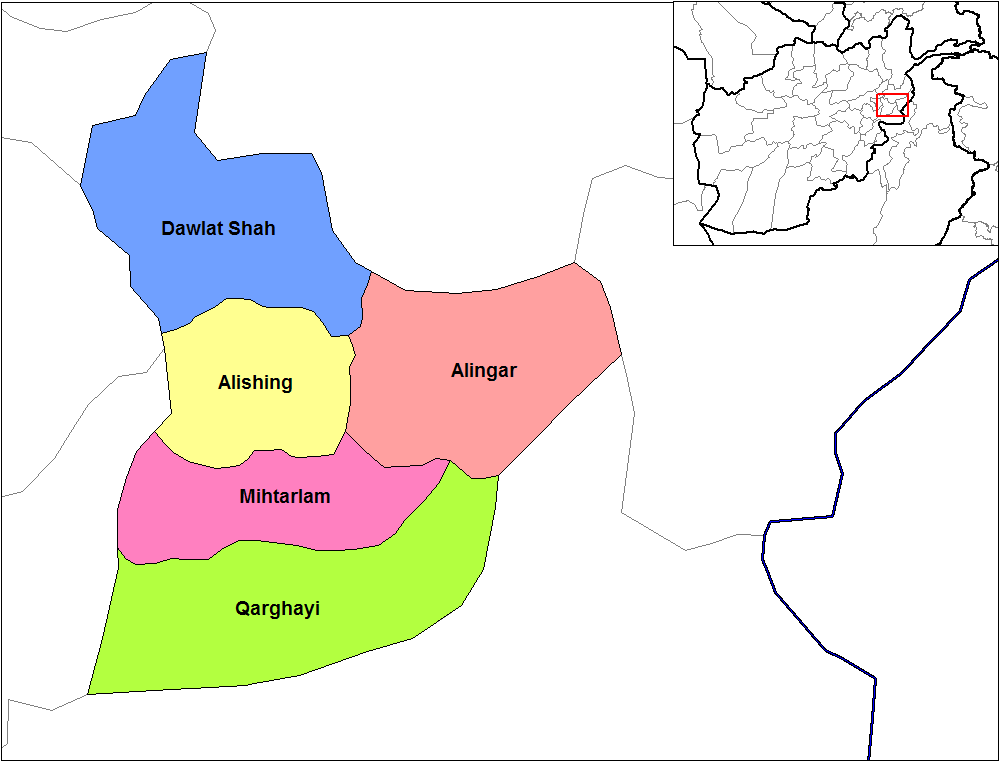
- Location in Laghman Province
- Country: Afghanistan
- Province: Laghman Province
- Capital: Lalkhanabad

Population (2006)
  - Total: 86,900
- Time zone: UTC+04:30 (AST)

Qarghayi District (Pashto: د قرغیو ولسوالۍ) of Afghanistan has 60 villages. It is the largest district in Laghman Province, and is located 30 km from the provincial centre of Mihtarlam. It borders Mihtarlam District to the north, Alingar District to the northeast, Nangarhar Province to the south and Kabul Province to the west. The district center is the village of Lalkhanabad, located between the Kabul River and its tributary the Alingar River.

== History ==
On 15 December 2014, a civilian was killed in a roadside mine blast. On 19 February 2019, six people were killed in a roadside bombing.

== Demographics ==
The population is 86,900 (2006) - 80% Pashtun, 5% Tajik and 15% Pashai.

== Economy ==
Most of the arable land in this district has not been drought-affected, so the agriculture is the main source of income. The health care is in relatively better condition than the other districts. During the wars 40% of the houses have been destroyed and the people, who fled are now returning.
