= Alishing District =

District of Laghman Province

Alishing District ولسوالی علیشنگ
- District
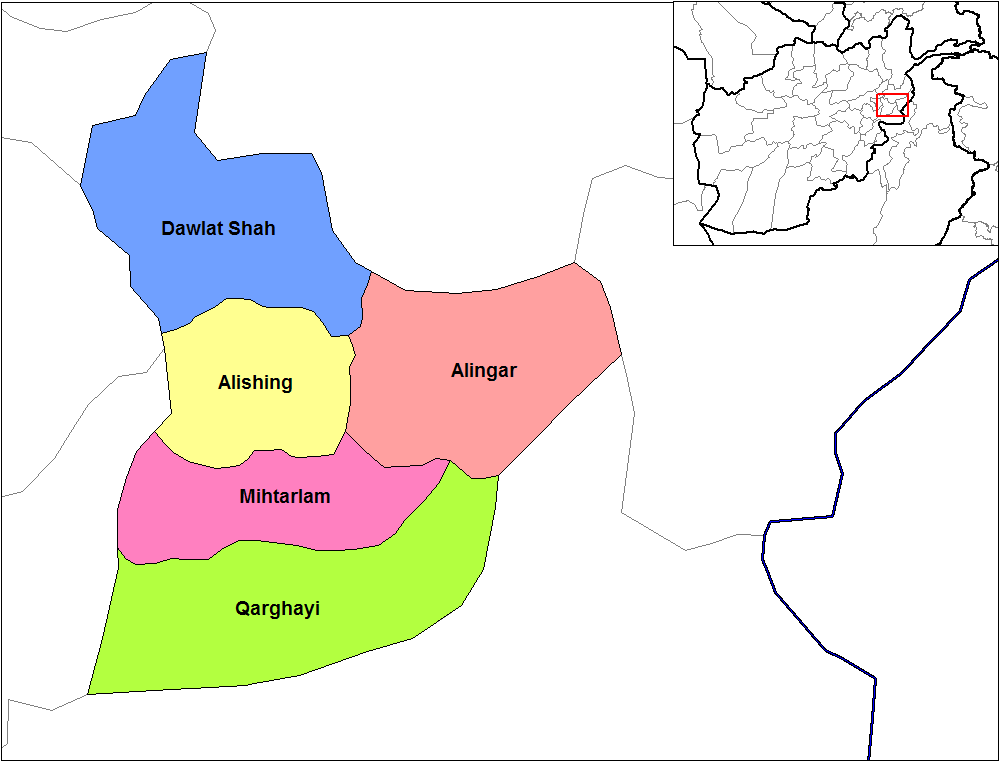
- Location in Laghman Province
- Country: Afghanistan
- Province: Laghman Province
- Capital: Alishang
- Elevation: 1,050 m (3,440 ft)
- Time zone: UTC+04:30 (AST)

Alishing District (Pashto: علي شینګ Dari: علي شینګ Pashayi: علي شینګ) is a district of Laghman Province in Afghanistan, located 21 km from Mihtarlam, the provincial centre. It borders Kabul and Kapisa provinces to the west, Dawlat Shah District to the north, Alingar District to the east and Mihtarlam District to the south. The district center is the village of Alishang, located on 34.7044°N 70.1539°E at 862 m altitude.

There are 12 zones, each with around 12 to 14 villages located in the valleys and mountains. The Alishing river crosses the district and is the main source of irrigation.

== Demographics ==
The population is 79,257 (2019): 65% of them Pashai, 20% Pashtun and 15% Tajik. The majority of the population is at least trilingual, speaking Dari, Pashto and Pashai. Though Pashai is spoken in everyday conversation, Dari and Pashto are spoken during formal affairs. Many people from outside these districts have difficulty in understanding the local accent and the Pashai language is not commonly spoken outside the region.

== Economy ==
The economy of the district is poor but some villages such as Qal'a-i-Najil have vibrant Bazaars. Most people in the district work in the agricultural based jobs. Some men work as migrant workers in countries like Iran or Pakistan as manual labourers during their 20s so to save enough to provide for the family's plot of land. Security in the district has been contested in recent year due to geographical location of the district to key terrain in the ongoing insurgencies across the eastern part of the country.

The district has good agricultural lands helped by annual flooding and organized irrigation. Most of the plots of land grow wheat, corn and alfalfa. Most family's keep a small garden to grow fruits and vegetables. The area is a mountainous district but has a paved road following the river valley from Mihtarlam to Dawlat Shah District. There are frequently floods, earthquakes and mudslides which annually cause heavy damage to key infrastructure such as check dams and bridges.

There are three schools in the district Andara, Qal'a-i-Najil and Kanday which serve ages 6 to 15. Though most people work in an agricultural based economy many read and write. Children seeking further educations go to urban centers like Mihtarlam, or Kabul. The majority of the population enjoys music and dance which was banned during the Taliban Government years.

== Culture ==
People enjoy Mehndi or henna a paste that is bought in a cone-shaped tube and is made into designs for men and women.

Mehndi is a ceremonial art form which originated in ancient Subcontinent of India. Mehndi can be applied to both men and women.^{[5]}. It is typically applied during weddings - most often for brides but sometimes for grooms. In Rajasthan, the grooms are given designs that are often as elaborate as those for brides. In Assam, apart from marriage, it is broadly used by unmarried women during Rongali bihu.

Muslims in Pakistan also started to use it as an indication of coming of age. In the Middle East and Africa, it is common for women to apply henna to their fingernails and toenails and to their hands.

== History ==
In the night of 10 May 2020, the Taliban attacked a convoy and security post in Alishing District. 27 Afghan soldiers were killed and several military vehicles were destroyed while nine soldiers remained missing after the attack.
