= William Watts McNair =

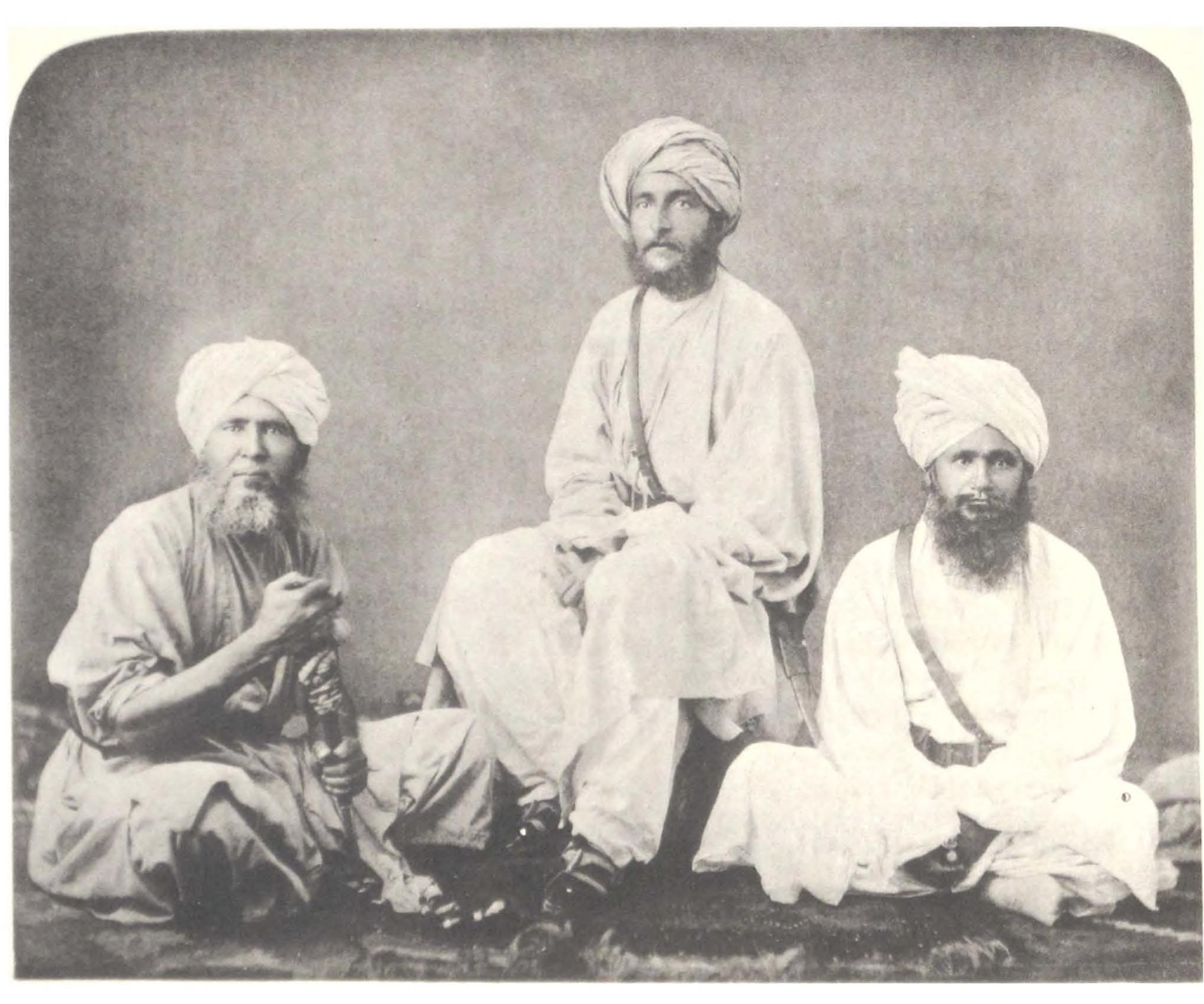
- McNair in disguise (centre)
- Born: 13 September 1849
- Died: 13 August 1889; Mussoorie
- Occupation: Geographer
- Awards: Murchison Award (1884)

William Watts McNair (13 September 1849 – 13 August 1889) was a British surveyor, the first British explorer of Kafiristan (now Nuristan).

== Early life ==
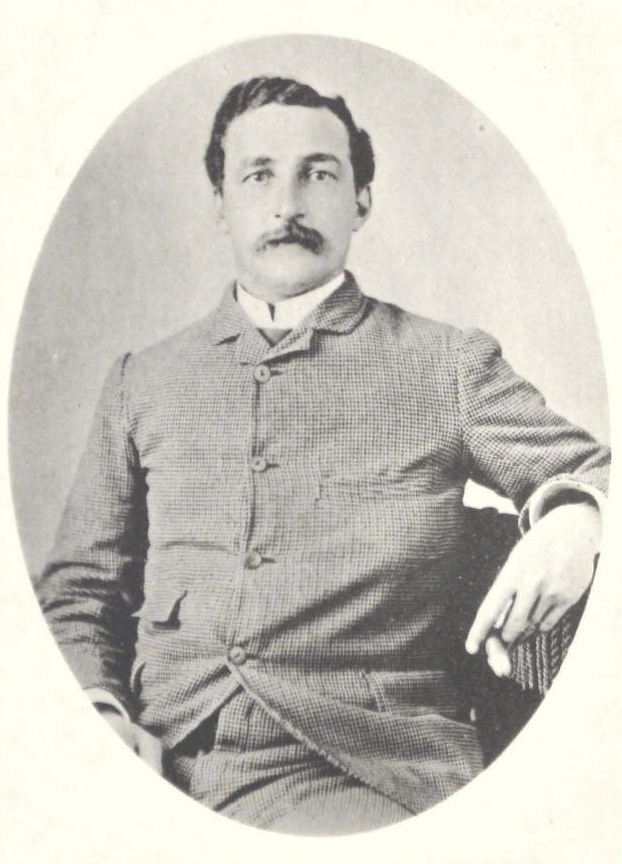
Portrait

Details of McNair's life up to the time of his 1883 journey are sketchy. According to John Keay, he was "country bred" (born and educated in India). He joined the Survey of India on 1 September 1867, just before his 18th birthday, and was posted to the Rajputana Topographical Party. "The first twelve years of his service were passed on topographical duty with this party under Major G. Strahan, R.E., and in the Mysore Party under Majors G. Strahan and H. R. Thuillier, R.E."

J. E. Howard, who compiled a memoir of McNair, mentioned his "ardent, buoyant, somewhat impulsive early manhood" and fondness for cricket. Howard made no comment about McNair's father, but did note that he had a sister and two younger brothers, John (who worked for the Indian Government's Finance Department before dying in his early twenties of small-pox contracted at Lahore), and George (who became a solicitor in Calcutta). In later years William lived with his mother and sister in Mussoorie. "A more united or more tenderly-knit family, of strong religious feeling, I have never known", Howard wrote.

With the Second Anglo-Afghan War under way, "in the autumn of 1879 he was selected to accompany the Khyber Column of the Afghan Field Force, and was present with that force during the severe fighting that occurred before Kabul in the winter of 1879–80, and the subsequent defence of Sharpur."

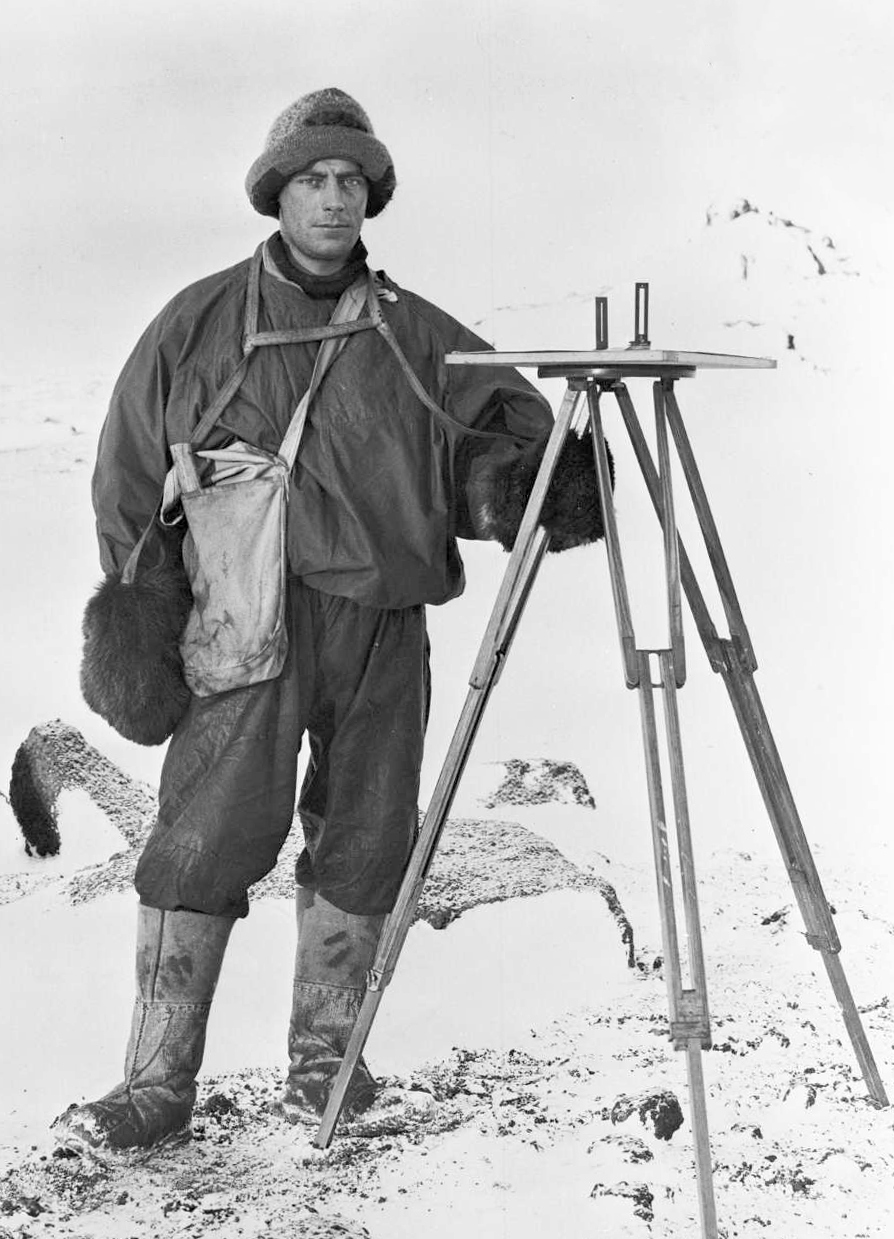
A plane table surveyor

"Whilst in Afghanistan he mapped a very large portion of hitherto unknown country, including the Lughman Valley and approaches to Kafiristan, and the Logar and Wardak Valleys to the south of Kabul. He explored the Adrak-Badrak Pass with a native escort, and made himself acquainted with the route from Kabul to Jalalabad, via Lughman, which was explored by no other European officer."

"At the close of the war he was attached to the Kohat Survey, under Major Holdich, R.E., and was specially employed in the risky work of mapping the frontier line from Kohat to Bannu, including a wide strip of trans-frontier country, and much of the hitherto unmapped Tochi Valley."

In spite of his contributions, he was never promoted beyond the third grade. He never married. According to Keay, he was fond of cricket.

"McNair possessed the rare faculty of commanding the confidence of natives", wrote Holdich. "He was not a specially good linguist, but he understood local idiosyncrasies." He made his day trips over the border into Afghanistan under the protection of "Mani Khan, a well-known Darwesh Khel chief of gigantic stature" with whom he maintained "a great friendship."

Sir Robert Warburton recalled an encounter with McNair in early 1880 at a Laghman Valley shrine near Mihtarlam:

The head keeper rushed up to us in great alarm and said, 'Here is a Sahib taking a picture of the ziarat, and he has only two men with him. This is Thursday, and hundreds of Talibs will come and say their prayers here this day; they may mob the gentleman, and then you will come and hang me. Please take him away.' We found the intruder to be Mr. McNair, of the Survey Department, quietly sketching, with two troopers of the 17th Bengal Cavalry behind him, but we persuaded him to come away with us. Some days afterwards I sent a few men with Mr. McNair to conduct him over the Adrak Badrak Pass, and having effected this with safety, he appeared before the General commanding the Gandamak Brigade, then on tour near Seh-Baba, much to that officer's astonishment, who would hardly credit that he had accomplished such a dangerous trip without a large escort."

== Journey to Kafiristan ==
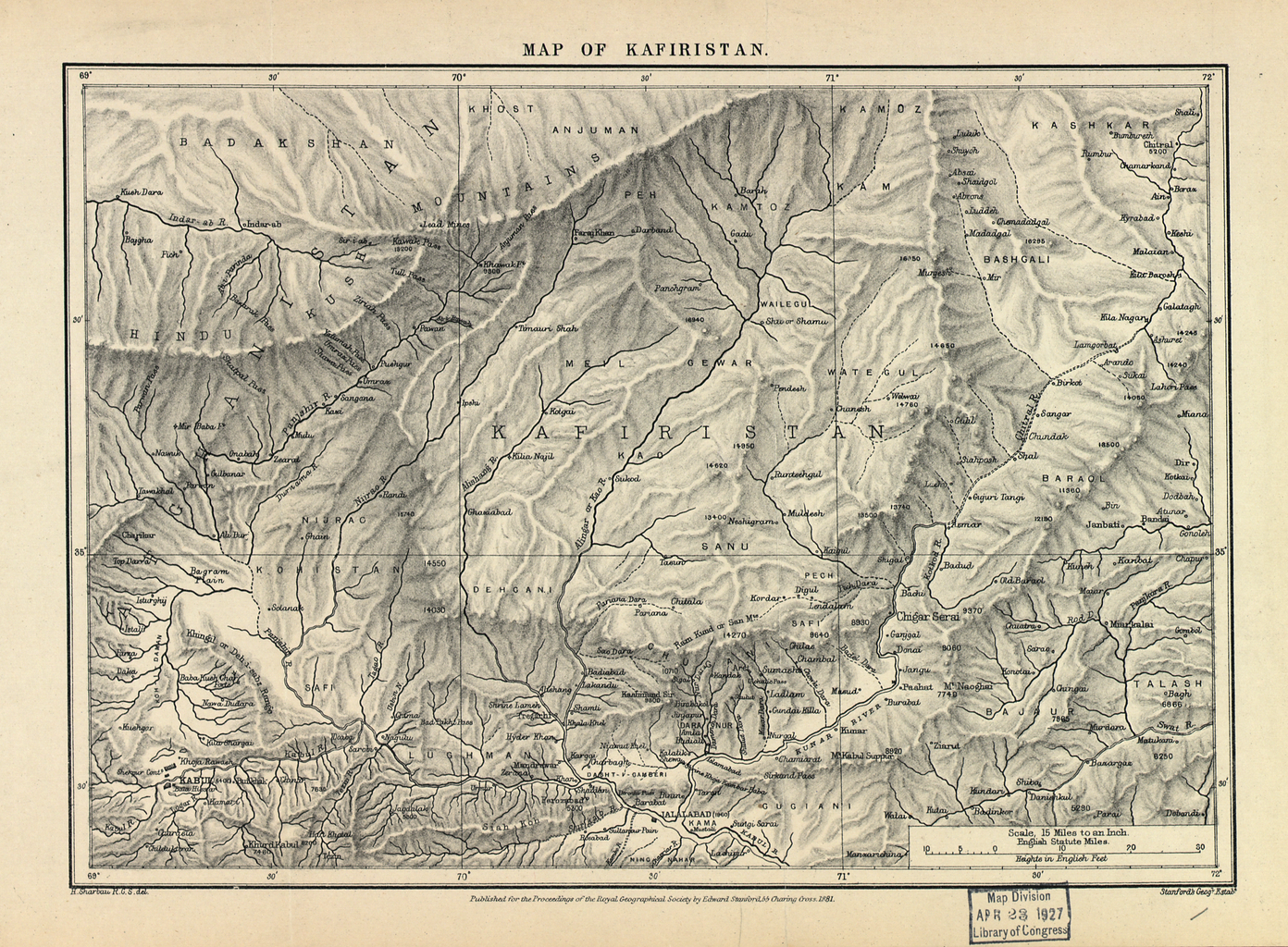
1881 map of Kafiristan, RGS

The idea for McNair's 1883 journey into Kafiristan came from a pundit associate known as "the Saiad." This was Syed Shah, "MacNair's assistant during the recent operations in Afghanistan."

"The Saiad, whose name I need not mention, had been made over to me more than a year ago by Major Holdich to instruct. This led to a mutual friendship, and on his explaining to me that he had a plan of getting into the Kafir country, which was by accompanying Meahs Hosein Shah and Sahib Gul (who yearly go to Chitral either through Dir or via the Kunar Valley) as far as Birkot and then following up the Arnawai stream, crossing the hills to the westward and returning to Jalalabad either by the Alingar or Alishang rivers, I suggested accompanying him in the guise of a Hakim or Tabib, i.e., native doctor. He was to be accompanied by Meah Gul, a Kafir convert."

McNair's surveying in Afghanistan had been limited to day trips since, as Holdich noted, "strict orders had been issued that on no account was any European officer or assistant to sleep on the wrong side of the frontier line." To get around the restriction, McNair applied for a one-year leave in March 1883.

On 9 April I was at Nowshera, where "by three o'clock on the following morning, with head shaved, a weak solution of caustic and walnut juice applied to hands and face, and wearing the dress peculiar to the Meahs or Kaka Khels, and in company with Hosein Shah, I sallied out as Mir Mahomed or Hakim Sahib." Three days later at Ganderi, he joined his three associates "our party then consisting of forty, including muleteers, and fifteen baggage animals", loaded with articles for trade: "cloths of English manufacture, musical boxes, binoculars, time-pieces, a spare revolver or two with a few rounds of ammunition, salt, glass beads, shells, needles, country-made looking-glasses, shoes, and lungis, as well as several phials and galipots of medicines", and for provisions "nothing but sugar and tea."

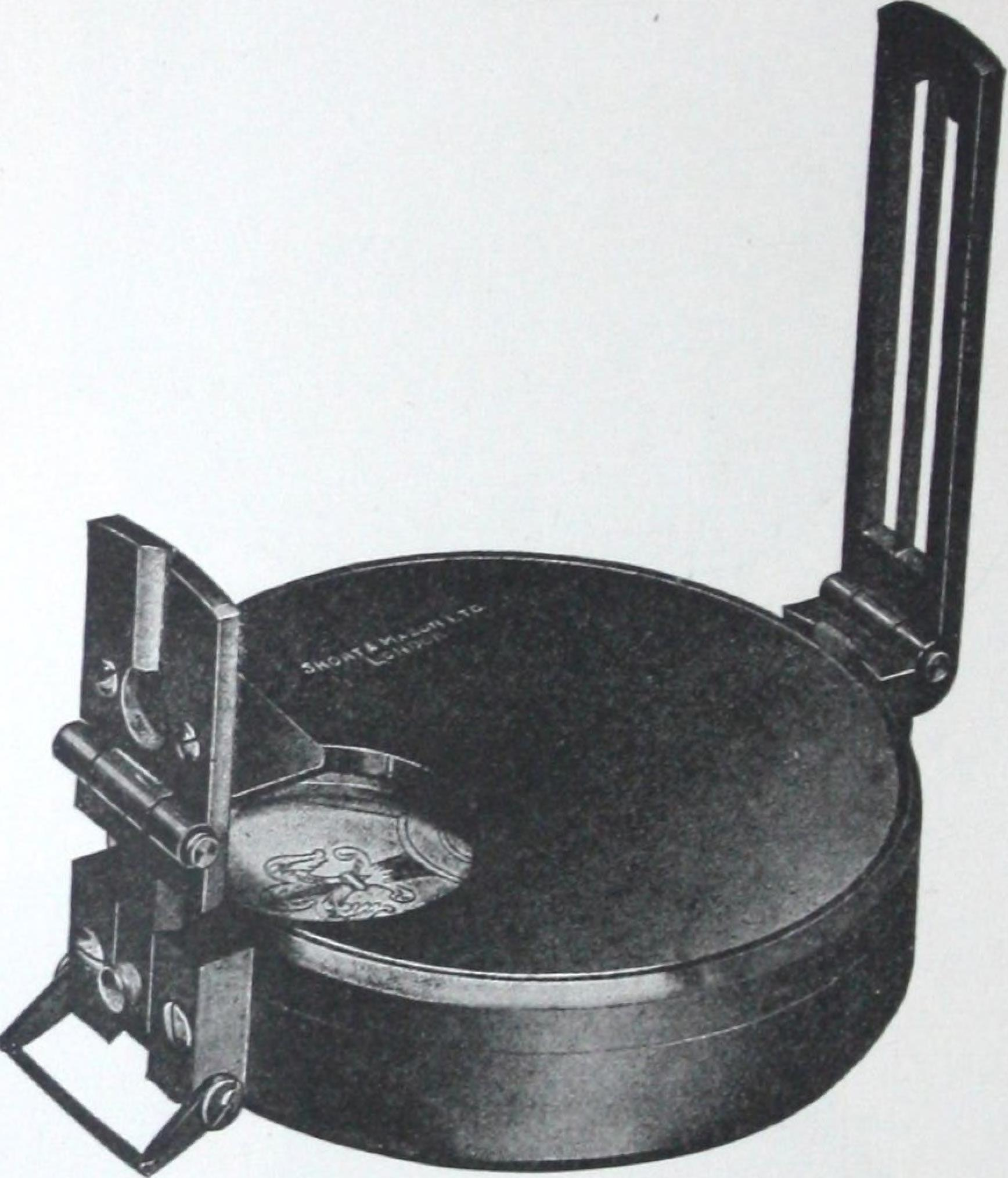
Prismatic compass

As McNair explained,

In addition to these I had secreted a prismatic and magnetic compass, a boiling point and aneroid thermometer, and a plane-table which I had constructed for the occasion. . . . It answered, in case of a surprise, to pass off for a tabib book of prescriptions; all that was necessary was to slip off the paper that was in use inside one of the folds and expose to the gaze of the inquisitive individual merely a book or rather the outer case of one, in which I had written several recipes in Urdu. The instruments were either carried by the Saiad or myself in a gooda, i.e., untanned skin of goat or sheep invariably used by travellers in this region."

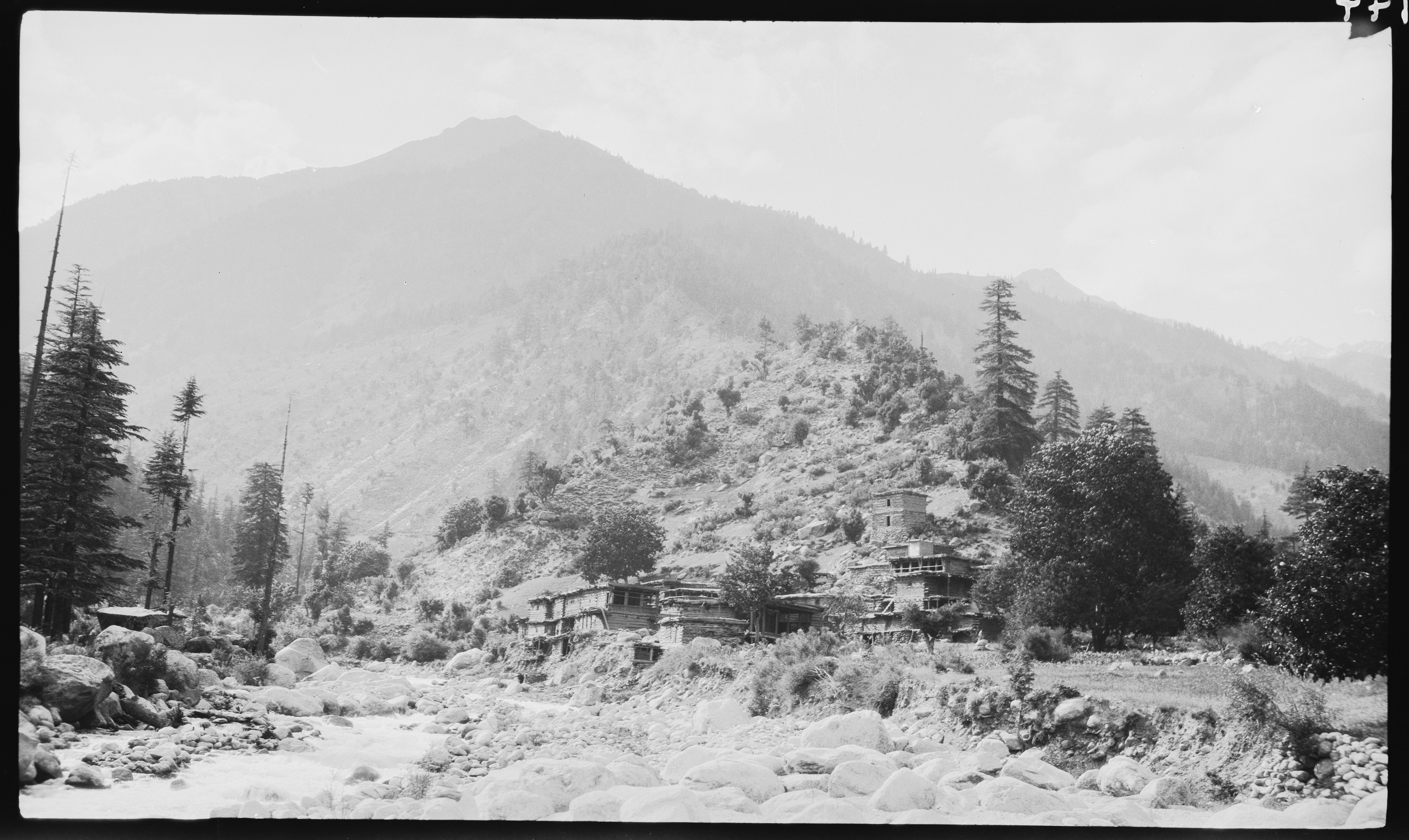
Rumbur Valley, 1929

On 23 May, McNair left Chitral in the morning of and by evening had arrived at Balankaru, in the Rumbur Valley. "The people are the Kalash section of the Kafirs, inferior in appearance, manner, and disposition to their neighbours situated westwards; they pay a small tribute in kind to Chitral, and are allowed to retain their own manners and customs. To Daras Karu, in the Bamburath Vale, famed for its pears, I next proceeded; here also are Kalash Kafirs, and some Bashgali settlers. The valley is very narrow, and the cultivation restricted principally to terraced fields on the hill-slopes. Kakar was the next march; beyond it no trace of habitation. ..head of the pass (the difference in elevation between our night's encampment and the crest was 7,000 feet)... The view on the Kotal as the sun was rising was a sight never to be forgotten." In the heavy snow, McNair and his companions entered the valley by "adopting a sort of 'tobogging' system." "At the Ludhe villages" they "were well received." But news arrived that a rival who had been spreading rumours alleging their party contained two Europeans in disguise, and "within a day or two of crossing the Shawal, Aman ul-Mulk summoned him back to Chitral; fearing for the safety of his colleagues, he obliged." They returned to India via Kashmir.

An early report of the trip, published in The Pioneer, was summarised by The Athenaeum in London on 15 September 1883:

Further intelligence respecting Mr. McNair's journey to Kafiristan has been supplied by The Pioneer. He appears to have been treated with hospitality and friendliness by the Khan of Dir, and, though opposed by the mullahs of Swat, was passed onwards to Chitral with honours and attendants. Using that point as a base of operations, Mr. McNair was enabled to pass into Kafiristan and reach the Dora Pass over the Hindu Kush, known to us from the journey of the native explorer, usually called the "Havildar." From this pass he contemplated proceeding into Badakhshan and making a detour to explore the little known region round Farajghan; but the moment happened to be unfavourable, and he was told that, on the whole, he had better keep to the southern side of the watershed. So he returned to Chitral, and followed a northern route to the foot of the Baroghil or Zeibak Pass, and thence diverged by a well-known route to Yassin and Gilgit, where he was enabled to join on his survey work to Col. Tanner's surveys of two years ago.

After his return, McNair submitted a confidential report. He was also invited to present his findings to the Royal Geographical Society in London.

== Royal Geographical Society lecture ==
McNair's 10 December 1883 lecture attracted considerable interest and discussion. "Colonel Yule said he had for thirty or forty years looked with intense interest at the dark spot of Kafiristan on the map of Asia, and had therefore listened with great pleasure to Mr. McNair's modest account of one of the most adventurous journeys that had ever been described before the Society." He "rejoiced that had lived to see Kafiristan partially revealed by an Englishman and not by a Russian."

G. W. Leitner stated that "there are at least five distinct dialects spoken by the tribes" and insisted that "no one should be sent out on a geographical, anthropological, or ethnographical mission who was not something of a linguist or who was not accompanied by a linguist."

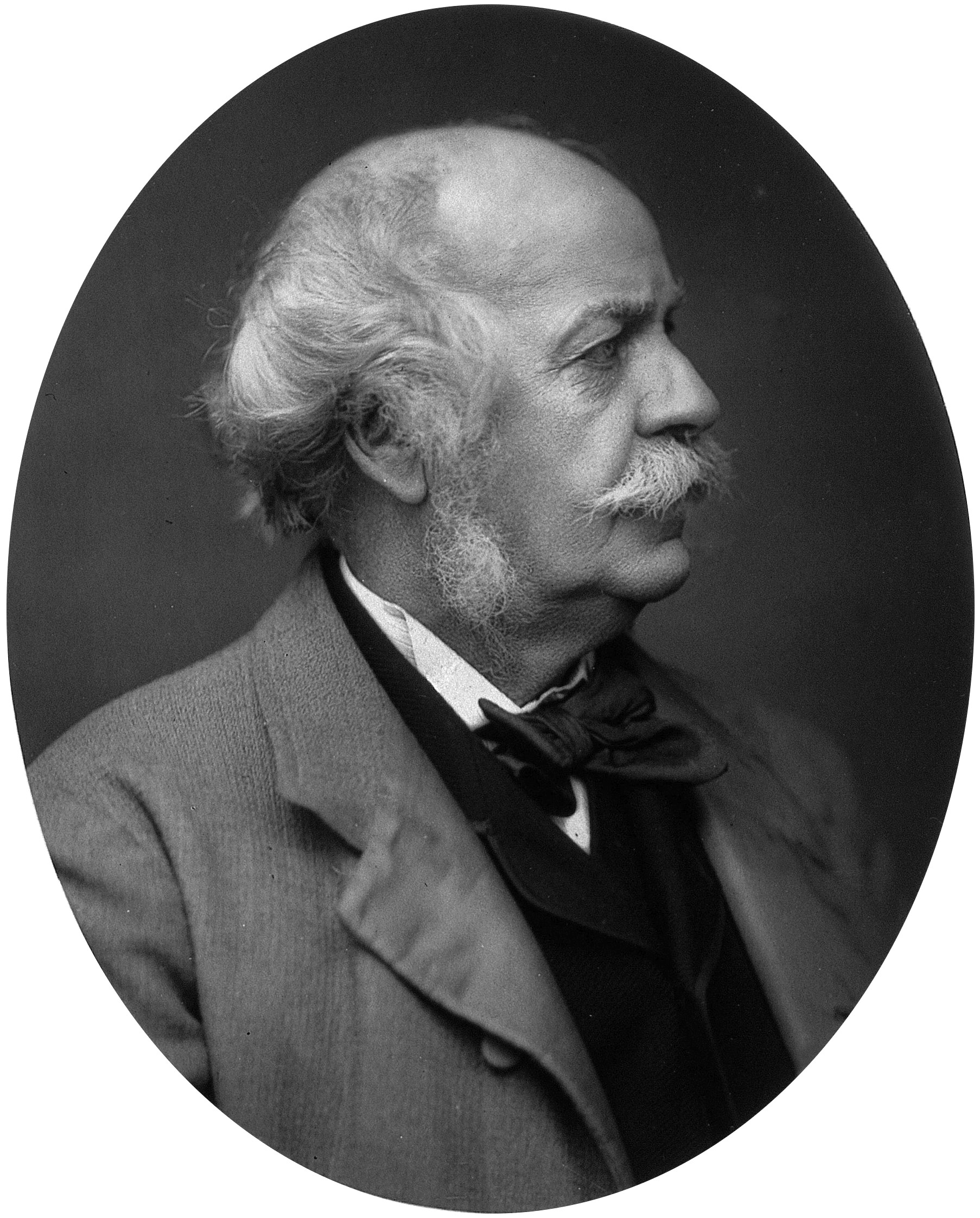
Sir Henry Rawlinson

Sir Henry Rawlinson expressed high appreciation of the value of McNair's exploration, which "was not a mere holiday trip, or an every-day reconnaissance survey; on the contrary, it was a serious undertaking, and opened up what he (Sir Henry), for twenty years had maintained to be the great natural highroad from India to Central Asia." Rawlinson believed "Mr. McNair was the first European who had ever crossed the Hindu Kush upon this line, or had gained such an acquaintance with the different ranges as would enable geographers to map the country scientifically, and delineate its physical features." The antique seal McNair had brought back "could only be explained by supposing it to have belonged to one of Alexander's soldiers who brought it from Babylon."

At the 26 May 1884 meeting the Society awarded McNair the Murchison Award for his contribution to geographical science.

== Later life ==
Officially reprimanded but privately commended by his superiors, McNair returned to surveying duty. "His worldly prospects were never advanced in the slightest", but he expressed no disappointment.

Sir Robert Warburton wrote, "when I saw him last at Peshawar, having escaped all dangers in Swat and Dir, he was trying to induce the Panjab Government to punish Rahat Shah Mia", the Kakakhel informant.

"A very serious horse accident" in the summer of 1888 was the beginning of a series of health troubles. When his request for leave was finally sanctioned in July 1889, he left Quetta, arriving in early August at his mountain home in Mussoorie. His mother and sister "had no knowledge of the dangerous character of the fever from which he had been suffering for nearly a fortnight before he started from Quetta", which was soon discovered to be typhoid. His brother George, a solicitor, was called from Calcutta, but arrived after the burial.

== Impact ==
McNair's confidential report was "a most valuable report to Government", according to Thomas Holdich. "When our relief force from India advanced through Swat to Chitral" in the 1895 Chitral Expedition, they were not "traversing unexplored and unknown ground", as was often supposed. "With but a small exception the route followed by our forces was that which was first followed by McNair."

== Reputation ==
Whether McNair had actually reached Kafiristan was later questioned.

Col. William Lockhart, in the area in 1885–6, wrote, "the map . . . is all wrong. This Shawal is the furthest point reached by McNair. He never was in the Lut-dih valley, or in Kafiristan proper, his experience of Kafirs being confined to the subject Kalash."

George Scott Robertson stated that McNair "never entered the real Kafir country at all; he only succeeded in reaching some of the Kalash villages of Chitral, which he mistook for the true Kafiristan. The Kalash referred to are an idol-worshipping tribe, slaves to the Mehtar of Chitral, and must not be confounded with the independent mountaineers of Kafiristan, from whom they differ in language, dress, manners, and customs."

Keay suggests that Robertson's comments were probably motivated by "professional pique" and explains that "much importance was attached to the distinction between the Kalash, who came under the administration of Chitral, and the true Kati Kafirs of what had been independent Kafiristan. In MacNair's day the distinction was less noteworthy, and he might well have crossed the Shawal without appreciating the extent to which it was a political and ethnological watershed."

McNair's vagueness regarding the Kafir villages is also difficult to explain. "Though he speaks of 'Ludhe villages' referring to Bragamatal in the upper Bashgal valley", Schuyler Jones notes, "he does not describe or name the village or villages he visited"

== McNair and Kipling ==
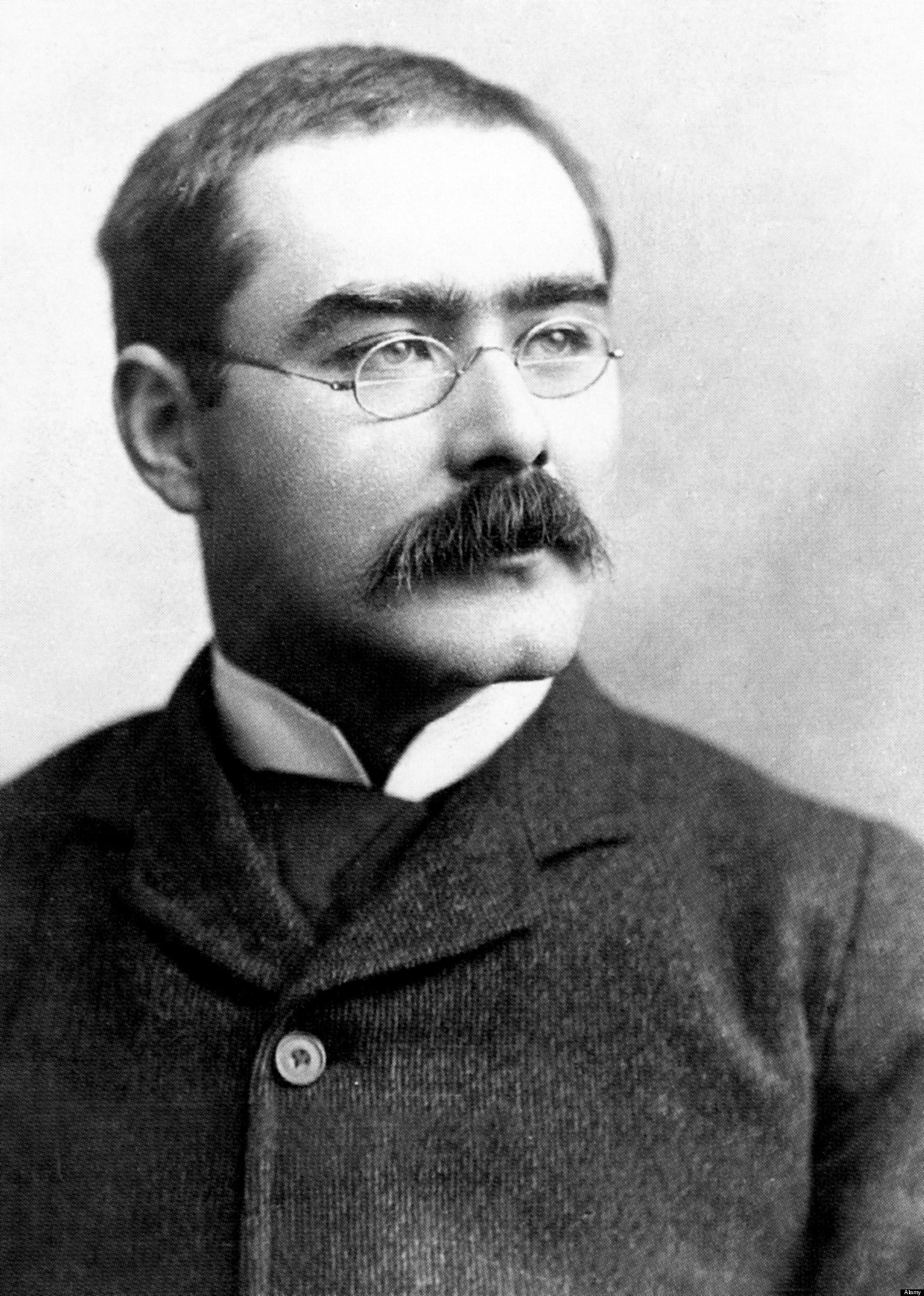
Rudyard Kipling

McNair's story has been proposed as a model for some of Rudyard Kipling's stories, including "The Man Who Would Be King" (1888), and less frequently, Kim (1901).

In 1882 Kipling returned to India to help edit Lahore's Civil and Military Gazette, a newspaper affiliated with The Pioneer in Allahabad, where Kipling worked from 1887 to early 1889. McNair's expedition was covered by both papers. As noted above, the Pioneer's early article on the expedition was summarised in The Athenaeum in September 1883. And "in 1883 and 1884, there were at least two reports in the CMG of journeys to Kafiristan, one by 'Mr. McNair, of the survey department,' disguised as a native hakim." McNair's lengthy obituary in The Pioneer (reprinted in Howard's Memoir), showed the editors' familiarity with McNair's accomplishments.

In a 1988 reprint of "The Man Who Would Be King", Hugh Haughton wrote, "There was in fact one precedent for the duo's daredevil journey, and in composing the story I suspect that Kipling may have drawn upon the account of a visit to Kafiristan made by W. W. McNair, which was read to the Royal Geographical Society in December 1883. McNair, an officer in the Indian Survey, disobeyed government orders forbidding Europeans to cross the frontier without permission, and made his way to Kafiristan disguised as a Muhammedan hakim, or native doctor."

"The conditions of McNair's journey", Edward Marx argued, "exhibit some striking similarities to those of Kipling's story, and certain details in McNair's account, as well, might have suggested ideas to Kipling, such as the 'antique seal' McNair brought to the Society's meeting, which he was inclined to think Egyptian." McNair noted that "the men shave the whole of the head, except a circular patch on the crown, where the hair is allowed to grow"; Dravot "shaved his head into patterns." Kipling's story follows McNair's description of the Kafirs as "incessantly engaged in petty warfare with the Mahommedans" but "exceedingly well disposed towards the British." "As regards their religion", McNair writes, "one Supreme Being (Imbra) is universally acknowledged. . . . Priests preside at their temples, in which stones are set up, but to neither priests nor idols is undue reverence paid." In Kipling's story the men encounter "half a dozen big stone idols . . . the biggest—a fellow they call Imbra." McNair's account, "give or take a few chiefs, is entirely consistent with the depiction of the Kafirs' arms and military abilities in Kipling's story, down to the matchlocks", Marx argued. "A final resemblance between McNair's account and Kipling's story is his abrupt departure from the country, precipitated by the arrival of an informant who was likely to alert authorities to McNair's identity, an eventuality that, as he had noted earlier, would likely have resulted in his death."
