= Dar-i Noor =

Dar-i Noor may refer to:

- Darai Nur District of Nangarhar Province, Afghanistan
  - Darai Nur, a town in Darai Nur District, Afghanistan, capital of the district
- Daria-i-Noor, a diamond
