= Afghan conquest of Kafiristan =

1895–96 Afghan campaign

Conquest of Kafiristan
Date	July 1895 – 8 February 1896
Location	Kafiristan (modern-day Nuristan Province, Afghanistan)
Result	Afghan victory
Territorial changes	Kafiristan incorporated into the Emirate of Afghanistan and renamed to Nuristan

Belligerents
Afghanistan	Kafiristan; Nuristani tribes

Commanders and leaders
Abdur Rahman Khan; Mohammad Ali Khan; Ghulam Haidar Khan Charkhi; General Katal Khan; Fayz Mohammad Charkhi	No centralised leadership

Strength
Unknown	Unknown

Casualties and losses
600 (Afghan claim)	10,000 killed (Afghan claim) many executed or displaced

In the winter of 1895–1896, Emir Abdur Rahman Khan of Afghanistan conquered Kafiristan as part of his campaign to consolidate Afghan territorial control. The region was renamed Nuristan (lit. Land of Light) to reflect the population's conversion to Islam. Pre-Islamic shrines, idols, and ritual structures were destroyed, and religious leaders were either executed, marginalised, or co-opted.

== Background ==
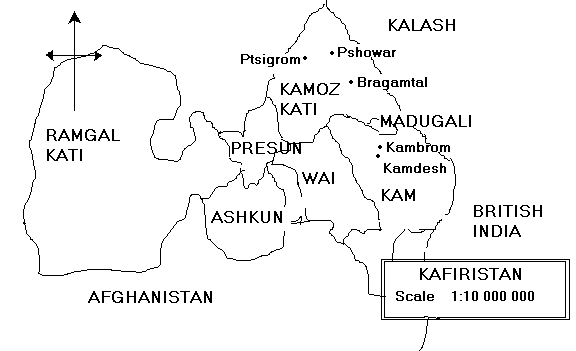
Map of Kafiristan prior to its conversion to Islam in 1896

In the late 19th-century, Kafiristan was one of the few regions in the Hindu Kush which remained outside control of either Afghanistan or British India. The tribes of Kafiristan (then known as Kafirs, and now known as Nuristanis, henceforth Nuristanis) were largely autonomous, although some of them paid tribute to and recognised the suzerainty of the Mehtar of Chitral, such as in Bashgal Valley.

George Scott Robertson, medical officer during the Second Anglo-Afghan War and later British political officer in the princely state of Chitral, was given permission by Mehtar Aman ul-Mulk to explore the region in 1890–91. He was escorted by mehtar's son Ghulam Dastagir along with a company sent by him. Robertson was the last outsider to visit the area and observe these people's polytheistic culture before their conversion to Islam. Robertson's 1896 account was entitled The Kafirs of the Hindu Kush.

In 1893, the Durand Line Agreement was signed between Emir Abdur Rahman and the British Indian Government to demarcate the respective spheres of influence. The clause III of the agreement put Bashgal Valley within Chitral. However, due to the strong claims from the Afghan side, the agreement was modified and Bashgal was ceded to Afghanistan on 9 April 1895.

The territory between Afghanistan and British India was demarcated between 1894 and 1896. Part of the frontier lying between Nawa Kotal in the outskirts of Mohmand country and Bashgal Valley on the outskirts of Kafiristan was demarcated by 1895 in the agreement reached on 9 April 1895. Emir Abdur Rahman Khan wanted to force every community and tribal confederation to accept his single interpretation of Islam due to it being the only uniting factor. After the subjugation of Hazaras in 1892–93, Kafiristan was the last remaining independent territory.

== Conquest ==
A few years after Robertson's visit, Abdur Rahman Khan's forces invaded Kafiristan as a symbolic climax to his campaigns to bring the country under a centralised Afghan government. In his autobiography, Abdur Rahman claimed that his forces captured the region in forty days.

The Afghan army, consisting of five regiments of infantry and one battery of artillery, entered Bashgal in July 1895. The fighting continued throughout the summer. A group of Nuristanis went to Chitral to seek the help of its ruler to whom they had paid annual tribute. However, under British pressure any such aid was refused by the mehtar.

The columns invaded it from the west through Panjshir to Kullum, the strongest fort of the region. The columns from the north came through Badakhshan and from the east through Asmar. A small column also came from south-west through Laghman. The Nuristanis were resettled in Laghman while the region was settled by veteran soldiers and other Afghans. Most of the Nuristanis were converted by force and some also converted to avoid the jizya.

In January 1896, fifteen hundred Nuristani prisoners of war along with war loot were sent to Kabul by the Afghan Commander-in-chief, Ghulam Haidar, with additional 2,500 Nuristani prisoners being sent to Kabul in April. Many Nuristanis fled to Chitral.

According to Afghan Government, over 10,000 Nuristanis were killed by Afghan soldiers, with Afghan casualties being 600. Another 16,000 Nuristanis were forcibly relocated to other parts of Afghanistan, reducing their population by half.

== Aftermath ==
Abdur Rahman Khan, who had thus conquered the region for Islam, renamed the people Nuristani ("Enlightened Ones" in Persian) and the land as Nuristan ("Land of the Enlightened"). On 16 January 1896, the city of Kabul was illuminated in celebration of Afghan victory.

In some parts, the Nuristanis continued to rise in rebellion for several years. A Kati rebellion was crushed in May 1897 and many fled to Chitral; in Pech Valley, Nuristanis led a rebellion in October 1898, which was suppressed in November. Active warfare came to end in around 1900. Several Nuristani songs were to commemorate the resistance, some of which were documented by Georg Morgenstierne into the 1960s, and pre-Islamic beliefs also survived in secrecy for several decades.

== See also ==
- Muslim conquests of Afghanistan
