= Mehtarlam District =

District of Laghman Province

Mehtarlam District مهترلام
- District
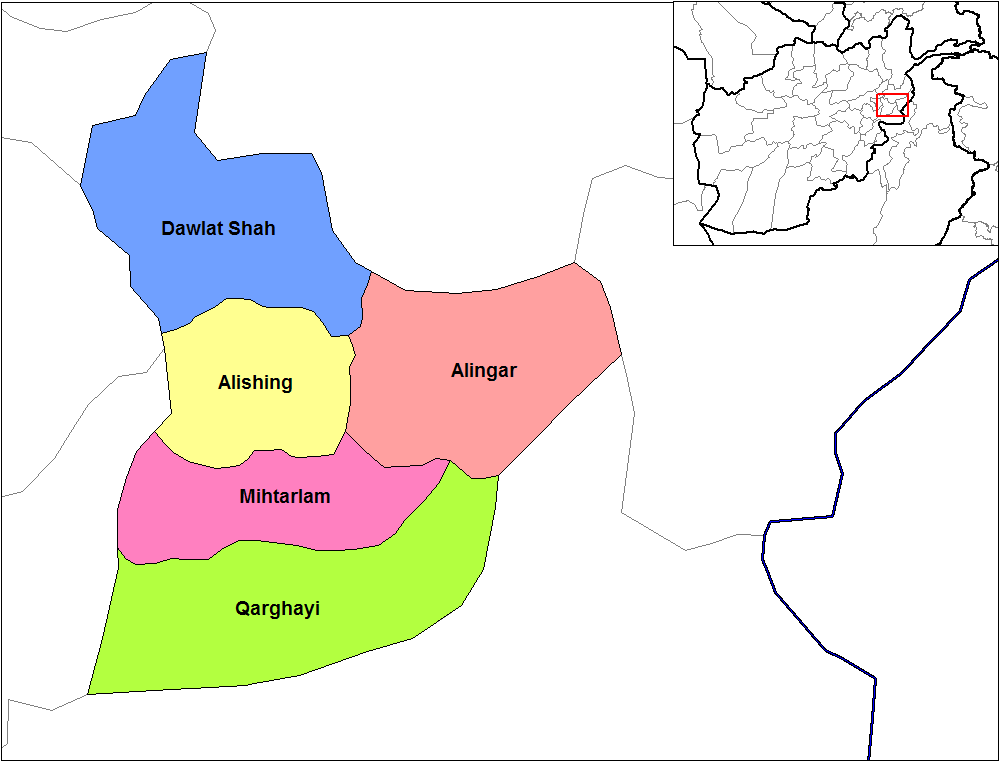
- Location in Laghman Province
- Country: Afghanistan
- Province: Laghman
- Capital: Mehtarlam
- Elevation: 779 m (2,556 ft)

Population (2025)
  - District: 160,123
  - Urban: 6,638
- Time zone: UTC+04:30 (Afghanistan Time)

Mehtarlam District (Pashto: د مهترلام ولسوالۍ) is one of the districts of Laghman Province, in eastern Afghanistan. It has an estimated population of 160,123 people.

The district is located in the center of the province and consists of the provincial capital Mehtarlam. There are 24 major villages and 269 sub-villages in the district.

Mehtarlam has a total land area of 14 km^{2} (5.4 sq mi) or 1,397 ha (3,450 acres). The district had 3,661 dwellings in 2015.

== Etymology ==
Mehtarlam derives from mehtar, meaning “chief” in Persian, and lam, meaning “village” in Pashayi. This is sometimes rendered as ram, depending on the dialect. The name therefore means “village of chiefs”.

== Geography ==
Mehterlam borders Kabul Province to the west, Alishing and Alingar districts to the north and Qarghayi District to the east and south.

== Demographics ==
Mehtarlam has an estimated population of 160,123 people. The ethnic composition is as follows: 60% Pashtun, 35% Tajik and 5% other.

== Land use ==
The Alishang river pours into Alingar River just south of the district center, and the lands around them are irrigated. Agriculture is the main source of income. About 59% of the houses were partially or fully destroyed during the wars. Many locals left to countries such as Pakistan, Iran and Turkey but now they are returning.

Mehtarlam is located in eastern Afghanistan 40 km (25 mi) from Jalalabad and between two rivers: Alishang and Alingar. It is almost equally divided between built-up land (51%) and non built-up land (49%). Residential land is largely clustered in Districts 1–3. District 1 is also home to a large commercial and institutional area (50 ha).
