= William McNair =

William McNair may refer to:

- William N. McNair, mayor of Pittsburgh, Pennsylvania
- William S. McNair, U.S. Army general
- William W. McNair, mayor of St. Anthony, Minnesota
- William Watts McNair, British surveyor
