= Lalkhanabad =

- Location in Afghanistan
- Coordinates: 34°33′11″N 70°13′37″E
- Country: Afghanistan
- Province: Laghman Province
- District: Qarghayi District
- Elevation: 2,093 ft (638 m)
- Time zone: UTC+4:30

The Lalkhanabad (Pashto: لال خان اباد) village is the center of Qarghayi District of Laghman Province, Afghanistan. It is located between the Kabul River and its tributary - the Alingar River.
