= Pashayi people =

Ethnic group in Afghanistan

Pashayi
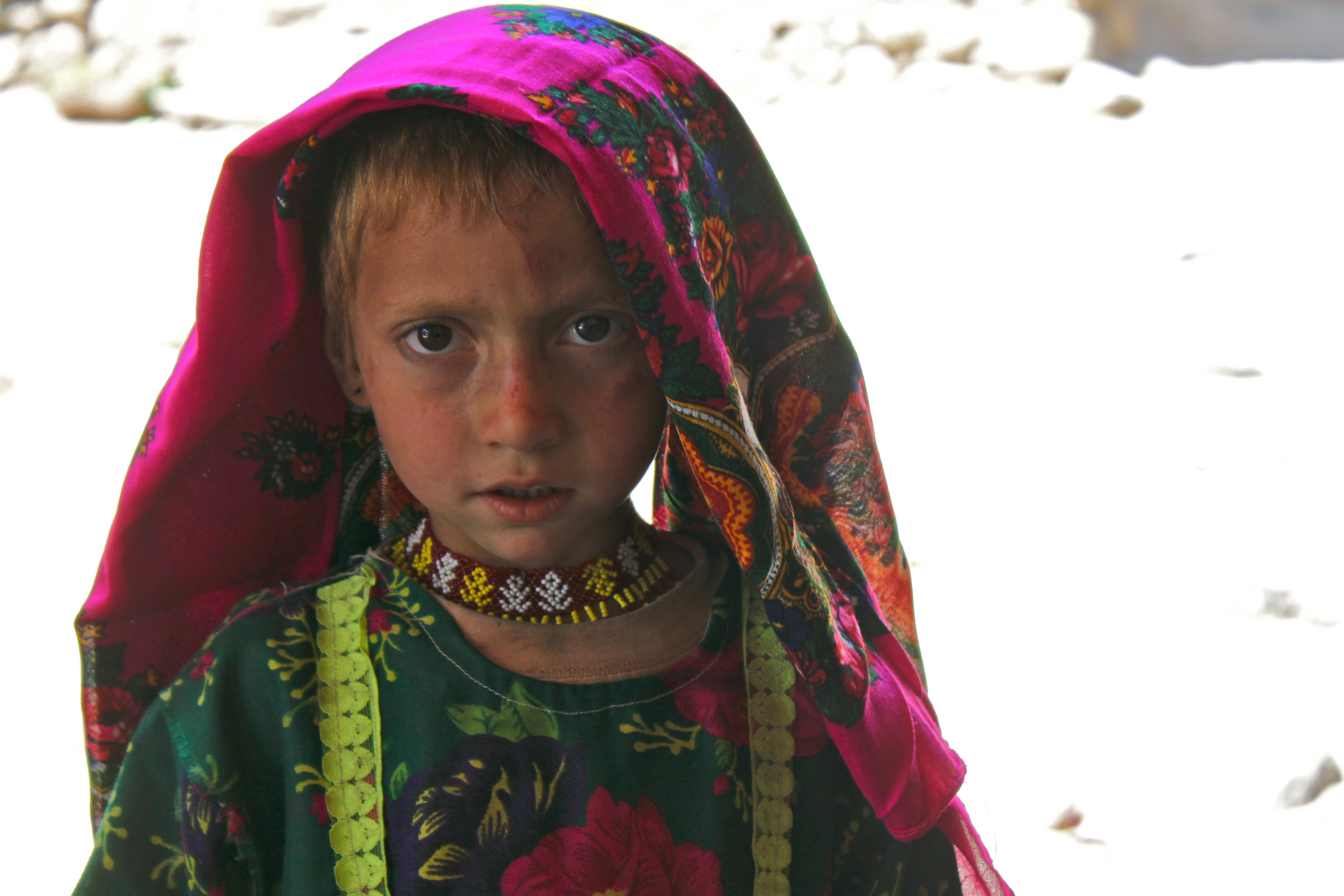
- Pashai girl in traditional clothing

Total population
- 600,000 (2018 est.)

Regions with significant populations
- Laghman, Kapisa, Nangarhar and northeast Kabul, Panjshir

Languages
- Pashayi languages Pashto and Persian also spoken as second languages

Religion
- Majority: Sunni Islam; Minority: Nizari Ismailism

Related ethnic groups
- Other Indo-Aryan peoples, Kalash, Nuristani

The Pashayi or Pashai, (/pəˈʃaɪ/; Pashayi: پشه‌ای, romanised: Paṣhəy) are an Indo-Aryan ethnolinguistic group living primarily in eastern Afghanistan. They are mainly concentrated in the provinces of Laghman, Nangarhar, Kunar, Kapisa, Parwan, Nuristan, and Panjshir, and Khyber Pakhtunkhwa in Pakistan.

Many Pashayi are bilingual in Pashto and sometimes trilingual with Persian. Some of the Pashayi have been assimilated by Pashtuns, whereas those in Panjshir and Parwan have been assimilated by Tajiks.

== Etymology ==
There are several theories regarding the origin of the word Pashayi, with some claiming it is over 2,500 years old. In 1891, Henry Walter Bellew stated "Pashae, or Pashie are attributive plural forms, meaning 'of the Kingdom Padshahi'. The Pashayi are still found by that name in the Darai Nur District of Nangarhar Province and Bamyan and Laghman districts, in the southern valleys. However, the Afghan Ministry of Information of Culture claim that Pashayi is derived from the words Baha Sha, Bahash and Bash which are words in the Pashayi languages. Others believe that the word comes from Psatha or Pishacha, meaning demon and carnivore. Others think that Pashayi is derived from Pashi, meaning "strong", "sturdy" and "rock wall" in the language.

The last theory claims that in ancient times, a king emerged from the Pashayi ethnic group, later being named after him as kings were referred to as Pasha or Padshāh. Pashayi historians and the Ministry of Culture and Information claim that the Pashayi people were referred to as Alina, evident through the naming of Alishang and Alingar District, Alingar meaning "home of the Alina".

Sir H. Rawlinson, in Monograph of the Oxus, suggests the name “Pashayi” might have originally been connected with Apresin and Paresin, the Zendavestian name for the region between Bactria and the Indus River. This name is also mentioned in the Babylonian version of the Behistun inscription, where the term is treated the same as Gaddra in Persian, which refers to Gandhara. It is possible that over time, the name “Pashayi” continued to be used, even if the original meaning was forgotten.

In the present, some Pashayi people refer to themselves as Degano (resident of the plain, additionally implying "indigenous" or "native"), Laghmani, Nuristani and Sha'ari, although the latter is a slur. Originally, it came from the Pashai expression šāre ke šāraman (‘let’s go’), from the verb šarik (to go, to move along).

== Geography ==
The Pashayi homeland, covering an area of 3,950 km^{2} (1,530 sq mi), is bounded by Kabul River to the south, the Panjshir River to the west, and the Kunar River to the east; the Pashayi predominantly inhabit the valleys of Alishang and Alingar rivers. Linguistically, they are in contact with Nuristani people to north, Pashtuns to south and Dari speakers to west. Pashayi form majority in Darai Nur District in Nangarhar, Alasay and Koh Band districts in Kapisa, and Alishing and Dawlat Shah districts in Laghman, with scattered population in the rest of provinces.

== History ==
=== Founding myths ===
Flag of the Pashayi people, sighted in Afghanistan and parts of Northern Pakistan

In Darra-i-Nur, the two most important descent groups are Soom, meaning hoof, and Shenganek, sheng meaning horn. According to Pashayi mythology, an unmarried woman had become pregnant and went into the mountains to give birth to a boy, subsequently abandoning the newborn under some leaves to hide her shame. A goat then discovered the boy, scraping the leaves away with their hoof, and raised the newborn, earning the name Soom. The story is repeated, except this time, the goat discovered the abandoned newborn with their horns, therefore earning the name Shenganek and becoming the ancestor of the Shenganek Pashayi. There is an additional tribe known as the Kolman or Kulman, as well as another tribe referred to as Surat Baig.

=== Origins ===
There is no consensus on the origins of the Pashayi. According to Christine Noelle-Karimi, the Pashayis and Nuristanis were native to the Kunar Valley and Laghman Province, near Jalalabad in north-east Afghanistan, until they were displaced to less fertile mountainous region by successive waves of immigration by Ghilji Pashtuns. Conversely, Ovesen and Keiser suggest that the Pashayi were not driven up into the mountain valleys where they reside and were, rather, the indigenous inhabitants of their region before the rise of the Gandhara civilisation.

The Pasiani, a tribe described by the ancient Greek scholar Strabo (1st century CE), as one of the Scythian peoples, were tentatively identified with the Pashayi by the pioneering archaeologist Charles Masson, in the 1830s. However, as Jeffrey Evans-von Krbek (1977) commented, Masson's research was devalued by a lack of clarity in his writing.

Religions traditionally practised by the Pashayi people (before the arrival of Islam) included variant forms of Buddhism and Hinduism, animism, local beliefs, or combinations of these. The Pashayi additionally practised Shamanism and sacrificed goats as part of their beliefs. According to the Sifat Nima, a book written by Darvish Mohammad Khan, the Pashayi worshipped gods named Pandad, Sharway, and Lamanday. According to Russian anthropologist G.J Daushvili, the Pashayi and other Western Dards shared a syncretic religion that featured elements of hunting cults, the Nuristani Kafir religion and Shaivism. It is additionally suggested by Keiser that the pre-Islamic Pashayi people may have followed a form of paganism similar to that of the Kalash people, rather than a corrupt form of Hindu-Buddhism.

In the 13th century, Marco Polo travelled through the region and described the locals as practitioners of sorcery and witchcraft, as well as calling them a "pestilent people" and crafty". Polo claimed that the men wore brooches and earrings decorated with gemstones, and that the main diet of the locals consisted of rice and meat. Among the Kafirs, there was a chief division known as the Pasha or Pasha-gar, which most likely referred to Pashayi people who resisted or escaped conversion to Islam.

In the 16th century, when Mughal ruler Babur visited Darai Nur, a district in Nangarhar Province primarily inhabited by the Pashayi people, he found that the eating of pork had only recently been forbidden and that the town was famous for its wine.

=== Pashayi conversion to Islam ===
According to the Tabakat-i-Akbari of Nizamuddin Ahmad, the Mughal emperor Akbar dispatched his younger brother Mirza Muhammad Hakim, who was a staunch adherent of the missionary-minded Naqshbandi Sufi order, against the infidels of Katwar in 1582. Hakim was a semi-independent governor of Kabul. The Sifat-nama-yi Darviš Muhammad Hān-i Ğāzī of Kadi Muhammad Salim who accompanied the expedition mentions its details. The Sifat-nama gives Muhammad Hakim the epithet of Darviš Khan Gazi. Muhammad Hakim's invasion fought its way from Laghman to Alishang, and is stated to have conquered and converted 66 valleys to Islam. After conquering Tajau and Nijrau valleys in Panjshir area, the soldiers established a fort at Islamabad at confluence of Alishang and Alingar rivers. They continued the raid up to Alishang and made their last effort against the non-Muslims of Alingar, fighting up to Mangu, the modern border between the Pashai and Ashkun-speaking areas.

During the 18th century, Pashtuns forced Pashayi people to convert to Islam, and conversions continued into recent history. According to Pashai oral tradition, in the mid-18th century, Deishamir Baba conquered Darra-i Nur Valley and converted the people to Islam. The valley was inhabited by Kafirs who only were armed with bows and arrows, whereas Deishamir Baba and his army had firearms. Deishamir Baba was from Kunar Valley, and he came to Darra-i Nur through Pech Valley and Aret and Shumast villages. The kafir rulers Bhim Raja of Bambakot, Shultan Raja of Sotan, and Sher Raja all surrendered to Deishamir Baba and converted to Islam. Laṇā Raja of Shemul was defeated and he fled the region. Muturu Raja of Utran fought with Deishamir Baba for a longer time, but eventually converted to Islam and became an ally of Deishamir Baba. Deishamir Baba had two sons, Ranga and Japar, and six grandsons. The six grandsons are the ancestors of the Pashai in Sotan. In Darra-i Nur, Deishamir decided to give permanent land settlements to family and followers instead of introducing a rotating land tenure system known as wesh, which integrated and strengthened the segmentary lineage systems of the Kohistani people, allowing them to ward off Pashtun attempts of invasion. By not introducing the wesh system, the Darai Nur valley's economic cohesion was strengthened and was therefore more immune to "Pashtunization". He invited Aṇu and Kolalek from Kordar to settle in Kandak, and Yarukei from Chelas to settle in Shemul. In return, they had to guard the north of the valley and water supply. He also allowed the Kafir Kalautar from Wama to settle Amla with his goats, on the condition that Kalautar give Deishamir tribute of a kharwar of cheese annually. Kalautar was later expelled because he would not convert to Islam but continued to pay tribute. In the south of the valley, the remaining Kafir rajas were under pressure due to lost allies (Bhim Raja and Shultan Raja) as well as poor land due to lack of water, and thus moved to the east. Bambakot's main market known as the Hindu Quarter also declined with the exodus of the Hindus. According to Ovsen, these events occurred in the early 19th century.

By the early 20th century, the Pashayi and Parachi were both collectively referred to as Kohistani, and were Sunni Muslims, while a minority were Nizari Isma'ili Muslims. There have been Pashayi-speaking Sikhs, although Muslim Pashayi people do not consider them as part of the ethnic group. Pashayi people have deliberately been listed as Tajik by census takers and government agents. This is a result of the census takers being Tajik themselves, wanting to increase their own numbers for "consequent benefits". However, Pashayi-speaking Nizari Isma'ili refer to themselves as Tajik.

During the 1929 Afghan Civil War, which saw the overthrow of King Amanullah Khan and fighting between the Saqqawists and anti-Saqqawist forces, Kalakani faced resistance on several fronts, including greater Nangarhar where Pashayi rebels loyal to Mohammad Nadir Shah and other opposition leaders managed to defeat Habibullāh Kalakāni in three battles.

== Culture ==
The Pashayi engage in a mixed economy of agriculture and herding. Common crops cultivated include rice, wheat, and corn. They also raise goats, cattle, and sheep. It has been noted that both the Pashayi, Nuristani people and other Dardic groups share a fascination with the goat, which might connote to pre-Islamic worship of the animal, or a goat-like deity. They also hold meetings known as marat to resolve issues, which has similarities to the Pashtun jirga, where Pashayi elders are also present and lead the discussions. The Pashayi people additionally perform a dance where young people of all genders gather in a circle, hold each other by their shoulders and begin singing songs. This is performed at weddings or during celebrations, and lasts for 20–25 minutes.

Marriage customs among the Pashayi additionally differ from those in other regions, where an engaged couple are permitted to spend time with each other and interact freely from the beginning of their engagement. Restrictions usually opposed on engaged couples in other regions do not apply, and wedding ceremonies also follow unique traditions. In recent years, the Pashayi Ethnic Union organisation was founded in Takhar Province, aiming to safeguard and promote the cultural and linguistic heritage of the Pashayi people.

== Demographics ==
Their total population was estimated in 2018 to be 600,000.

== Notable people ==
- Hazrat Ali, Northern Alliance commander
- Rafiullah Bidar, IEC Commissioner
- Muhammad Alim Qarar, Hezb-e Islami commander
- Abdul Rahman Rahmani, Kabul Eagles cricketer

== See also ==
- Pashayi languages
