= Dawlat Shah District =

District of Laghman Province

Dawlat Shah District is located approximately 74 km from Mihterlam, the provincial centre of Laghman Province in Afghanistan. It is a mountainous district and borders Nuristan Province to the north and north-east, Alingar District to the east, Alishing District to the south and Alasay District of Kapisa Province to the west. The population is 36,950 (2019): 70% Pashai, 29% Tajik and 1% Pashtun.

It has 60 villages. The district center is the village of Dawlat Shah, located on 34.9528°N 70.07°E at 1583 m altitude in the Hindukush mountains in the valley of the Alishing river. On 20 May 2021 it was captured by Taliban in their 2021 offensive.
