= Alingar District =

District of Laghman Province

- District
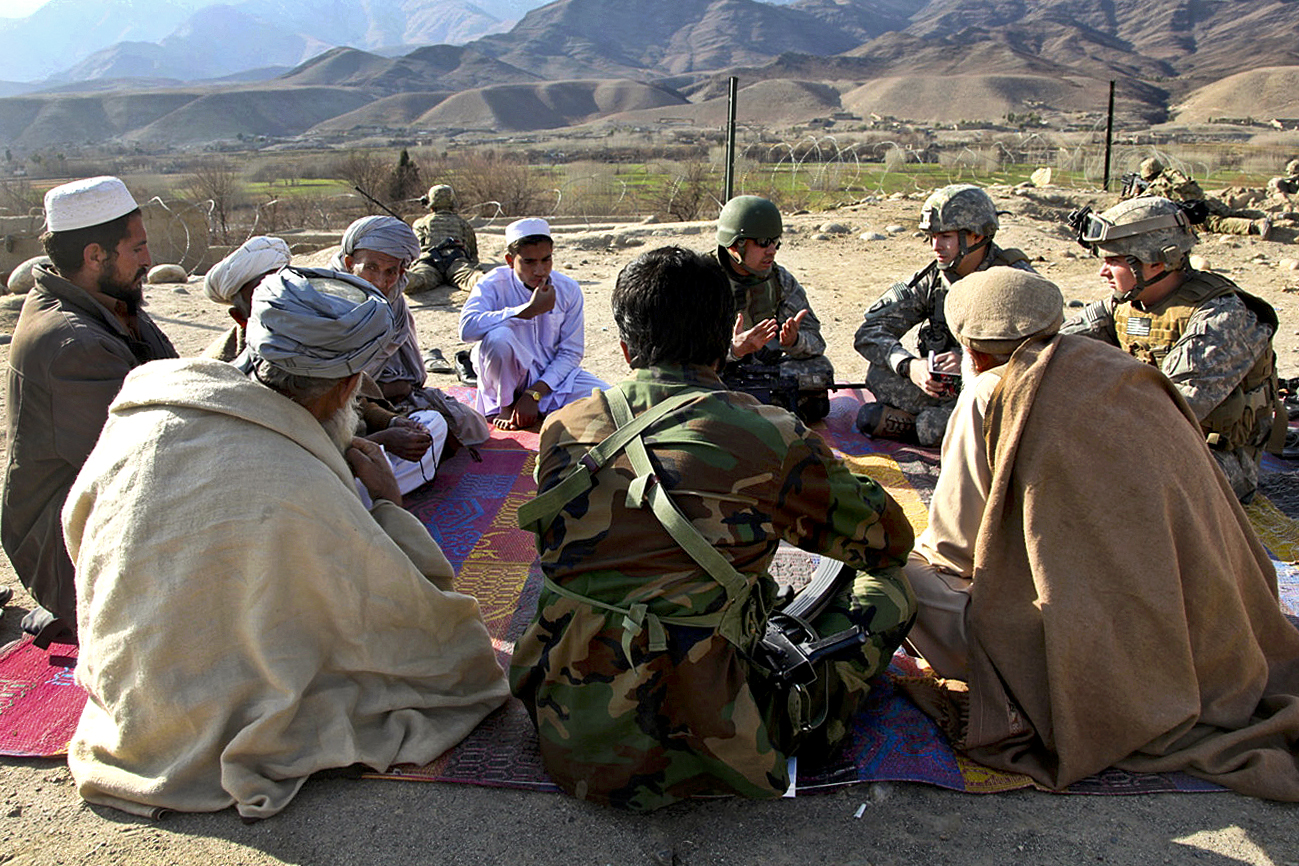
- US Army Psyops personnel meet with village elders from Mangow village in Laghman province

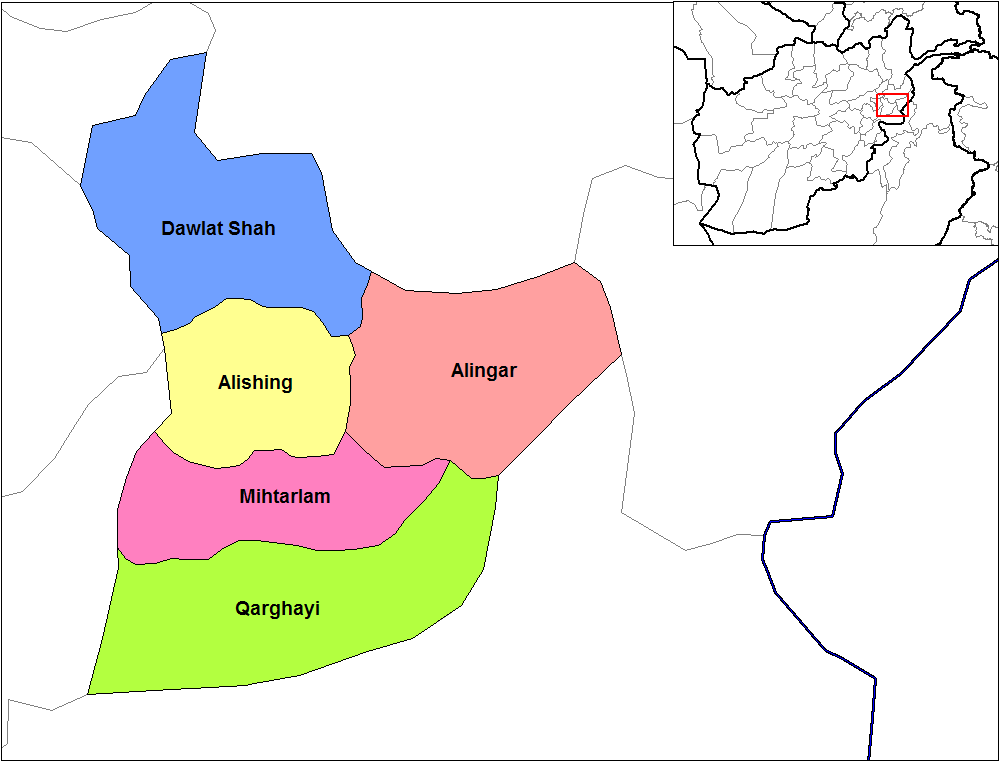
- Location in Laghman Province
- Country: Afghanistan
- Province: Laghman Province
- Capital: Shahi
- Elevation: 850 m (2,790 ft)

Population (2006)
  - Total: 85,600
- Time zone: UTC+04:30 (AST)

Alingar District (Pashto: د الینګار ولسوالۍ) is located approximately 27 km from Mehtarlam, the provincial capital of Laghman Province and borders with Alishing and Dawlat Shah districts to the West, Nuristan Province to the North, Kunar and Nangarhar provinces to the East and Qarghayi and Mihtarlam districts to the South.It has about 60 villages located in four main valleys. The population is 85,600 (2006) - 70% of them Pashtun, 20% Pashai and 5% Tajik. The district center is the village of Shahi, located on 34.8347°N 70.3603°E at 915 m altitude, in the valley of the Alingar River, which crosses the district and is the main source of irrigation. The security situation is reported to be relatively stable, although there are some private disputes. The district is reported free of landmines.

The main crops are wheat, rice, corn, vegetables. There are also fields with poppy. The district is mountainous and there is little arable land. Some of the agricultural land has been destroyed by flooding. The main sources of income are farming, daily wage labour and remittances from abroad. It was reported that around 30% of the population work in agriculture, 20% work abroad in Pakistan and Iran, 2% are government employees, 2% traders, and around 45% are without work.

During the Soviet-Afghan War 80% of the houses were destroyed and many residents fled to Pakistan and now they are returning slowly. The health care and education sectors are relatively well, but improvement is needed especially in the distant villages.
