= Laghman University =

University in Mehterlam, Afghanistan

- پوهنتون لغمان / د لغمان پوهنتون
- Type: Public
- Established: 2011
- Chancellor: Sheikh Mohammad Munir Haqani
- Location: Mehtarlam, Laghman Province, Afghanistan
- Website: lu.edu.af

Laghman University (Pashto: د لغمان پوهنتون; Dari: پوهنتون لغمان) is a public university in Mehtarlam, which is the capital of Laghman Province in eastern Afghanistan. It was established in 2011. Sheikh Mohammad Munir Haqani is its chancellor.

Laghman University has 72 bachelor's and master's degree teachers in five faculties.

== Faculties ==
The following faculties are available at Laghman University:

1. Literature and Human Science
2. Agriculture
3. Education
4. Engineering
5. Economics
6. Sharia

== See also ==
- List of universities in Afghanistan
