= Hajji Dunya Gul Niazi Jamia Masjid =

Mosque in Mihtarlam, Laghman, Afghanistan

- حاجی دنیا ګل نیازی جامعه مسجد
- Location of the mosque in Afghanistan

Religion
- Affiliation: Islam
- Ecclesiastical or organizational status: Mosque
- Status: Active

Location
- Location: Mihtarlam, Laghman Province
- Country: Afghanistan
- Interactive map of Hajji Dunya Gul Niazi Jamia Masjid
- Coordinates: 34°41′14″N 70°12′25″E

Architecture
- Style: Islamic
- Completed: 2021

Specifications
- Capacity: 2,000 worshippers
- Dome: One
- Minaret: Two

The Hajji Dunya Gul Niazi Jamia Masjid (Pashto: حاجی دنیا ګل نیازی جامعه مسجد) is a mosque in the city of Mihtarlam in Laghman Province, Afghanistan. Construction work on two mosques was launched in 2017. The second mosque opened in 2021 and has a capacity of 2,000 worshippers at a time. The two-storey mosque includes an Islamic sciences training center.

== See also ==
- Islam in Afghanistan
- List of mosques in Afghanistan
