= Katë people =

Nuristani ethnic group

Katë
Total population
- Approximately 40,000 (as of 1890)

Regions with significant populations
- Nuristan, Afghanistan; Chitral, Pakistan

Languages
- Katë language

Religion
- Sunni Islam

Related ethnic groups
- Other Nuristanis, especially Kom

The Katë (also rendered Katir, Kati, Kator and Kata) are a Nuristani tribe in Afghanistan and Pakistan.

== Etymology ==
The Katë [ka'tɘ] or Kata Kafir people was numerically the most dominant group of the Siah-Posh (Persian "Black Wearer/Clothed") tribes. They owned approximately forty villages in the Bashgul valley and numbered about 40,000 (1890).

The upper part of the Bashgul Valley of Nuristan (Afghanistan) is known as Katirgul. It is called Lutdeh in Chitrali and Kantozi in Pashto.

According to George Scott Robertson, the Katir Siah-Posh clan settled in Katirgul valley was called Kamtoz (or Camtoz) in Pashto and Lutdehhchis in Chitrali (The Kafirs of the Hindu Kush, p 71). But American investigator Richard Strand's website suggests that the name Kamtoz/Kamtozi may apply to all Katirs of the former Siah-Posh group, including the Ramguli and Kulam Katirs .

Alternative names for Kamtoz are Camtozi, Kantozi. Despite their fiercely independent nature, the Katis, together with the Kom tribe, were tributary to the Mehtar of Chitral. The nature of this tributary relationship was inconsistent because the Katis and Koms would often raid Chitrali territory for livestock and head-hunting. In retaliation the Mehtars would invade the Bashgul Valley and enslave entire villages. During the reign of Mehtar Aman-ul-Mulk the relationship was formalised and the Kafirs would pay an annual tribute of slaves.

Numerous scholars have connected the names Katir/Kator/Kata and Kam/Kom with ancient Kambojas and identified the Kafirs, especially the Siah-Posh Kafirs, as having descended from ancient. The Kata Tribe also lives in Chitral and very much mixed with Chitralis. There is a popular stone by the name of Kata Boht situated in Ozhore (Juwara) Valley Chitral. The Kata Tribe also lives in Ozhore and also other part of Chitral. The other fact is the tribe lives in Gram; gram is a Nuristani word (of Indo-Aryan origin) meaning "village" (as a "community"). In ancient times, people were considered rich according to their ownership of animals or land. As the Kata tribe in Chitral was considered to be relatively rich, over time, Chitrali speakers began to use kata to mean "rich" or "big".

== History ==
Kafiristan is a mountainous region of the Hindu Kush that was isolated and politically independent until the conquest by Afghan conquest of 1896. The region became a refuge of an old group of Indo-European people probably mixed with an older substratum, as well as a refuge of a distinct Kafiri group of Indo-Iranian languages, forming part of the wider Dardic languages. The inhabitants were known as "kafirs" due to their enduring polytheism (closely related to Vedic religion) while other regions around them became Muslim. However, the influence from district names in Kafiristan of Katwar or Kator and the ethnic name Kati has also been suggested. The Kafirs were divided into Siyah-Posh, comprising five sub-tribes who spoke Katɘ language while the others were called Safed-Posh comprising Paruni, Waigeli, Wamai and Ashkun.

The Nuristani/Kafir people practised a form of ancient Hinduism, infused with accretions developed locally. Kafirs represent non-Rigvedic Aryans, identical with the Dasas. That their ancestors were pre-Rigvedic Aryans can be inferred from linguistic, ethnological and theological evidence. The Kafiri/Nuristani languages contain certain phonetic features not found in Indo-Iranian languages. Their chief deity is Imra i.e. Yamaraja which was brought there by the Dasas who worshipped Asuras especially Yama and Varuna. Their primary goddess was Disani. They also worshipped Indra or Inder.

=== Invasion of Timur (1398) ===
On his way to India, Timur attacked the Siyah-Posh in 1398 A.D. after receiving complaints from the trading city of Andarab by raids from Kafirs. He penetrated it from Khawak pass and restored an old fortress there. Timur personally proceeded against the Kator/Katwar and sent a detachment of 10,000 soldiers against Siyah-Poshas under Burhan Aglan and had the fort of Kator/Katwar deserted by Kafirs destroyed while the houses of the city were burnt.

The Kafirs took refuge on top of a hill and many were killed in the ensuing clash. Some held out for three days but agreed to convert after Timur offered them the choice between death and Islam. They however soon apostatised and ambushed Muslim soldiers in the night. They were however repelled and a number of the Kafirs were killed, with 150 taken prisoner and later executed. Timur ordered his men "to kill all the men, to make prisoners of women and children, and to plunder and lay waste all their property." His soldiers carried out the order and he directed them to build a tower of skulls of the dead Kafirs. Timur had his expedition engraved on a neighbouring hill in the month of Ramazan. His detachment sent against Siyah-Posh however met with disaster with Aglan routed and fleeing. A small detachment of 400 men under Muhammad Azad was sent and defeated the Kafirs, retrieving the horses and armour Aglan lost. Timur captured a few places later, though nothing more is stated, presumably he left the Siyah-Posh alone. He then proceeded to exterminate the rebellious Afghan tribes and crossed the Sindhu river in September 1398.

=== Conversion to Islam (late 19th century) ===
The territory between Afghanistan and British India was demarcated between 1894 and 1896. Part of the frontier lying between Nawa Kotal in outskirts of Mohmand country and Bashgal Valley on outskirts of Kafiristan were demarcated by 1895 with an agreement reached on 9 April 1895. Emir Abdur Rahman Khan invaded Kafiristan in the winter of 1895-1896 and captured it in 40 days according to his autobiography. Columns invaded it from the west through Panjshir to Kullum, the strongest fort of the region. The columns from the north came through Badakhshan and from the east through Asmar. A small column also came from south-west through Laghman. A small number of Kati refugee's escaped across the border into Kalash territory which was on the British side . Villages were founded in a number of valley's with Brumbutal in the Bumboret valley and Kunisht in a neighbouring Kalash valley, however these to would become Islamic within a generation . The Kafirs were converted to Islam and resettled in Laghman while the region was settled by veteran soldiers and other Afghans. Kafiristan was renamed as Nooristan.

The former Kafiristan's people were renamed Nuristani (The Enlightened Ones) from the proper noun Nuristan (Land of Enlightenment). Presently they are known by Nuristani Kata or simply Kata.

Georg Morgenstierne visited the Bumboret Valley in 1929 during his field work on Nuristani (Kafir) languages. He encountered the two last remaining unconverted "Kafir" priests of the region, called Bagashai and Kareik. Bagashai deceased after 1935.

Around 1890, the Katir Kafir division was further sub-divided as under:

- The Katirs of Bashgul Valley.
- The Katirs or the Kti Valley,
- The Kulam Katirs of the Kulam country and
- The Ramguli Katirs of Ramgul Valley.
- The Kata of Chitral: Gobor, Rumbur, Bumboret
- The Jana Matongdir Katirs of Ozhor Valley.

== See also ==
- Hindukush Kafir people
- Kom
- Kata-vari
- Katirs
- Kamtoz
- Kam
- Kafirstan
- Nurestan
- Nuristani people
- Nuristani languages
