= Darai Nur District =

Darai Nur District دره نور
- District
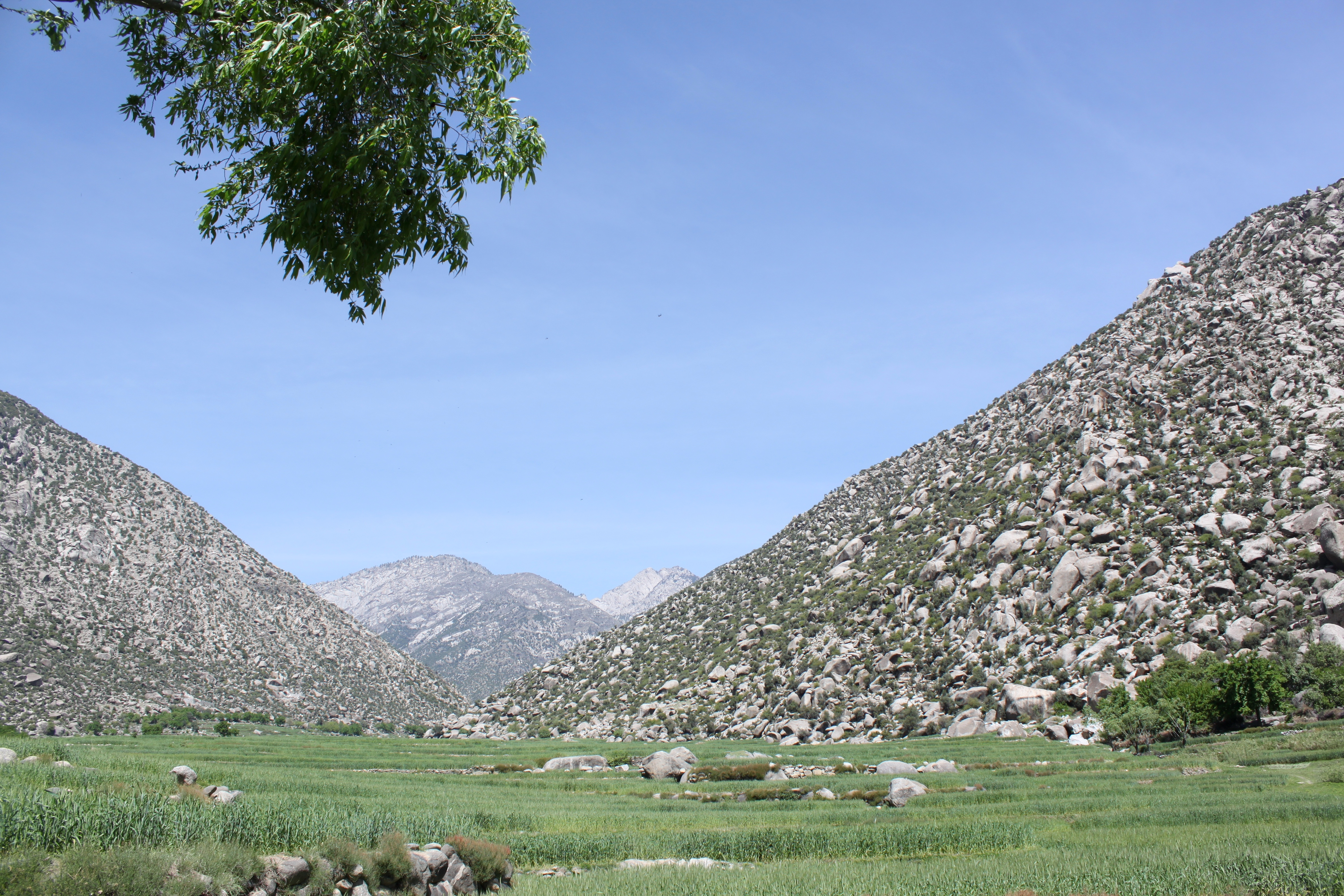

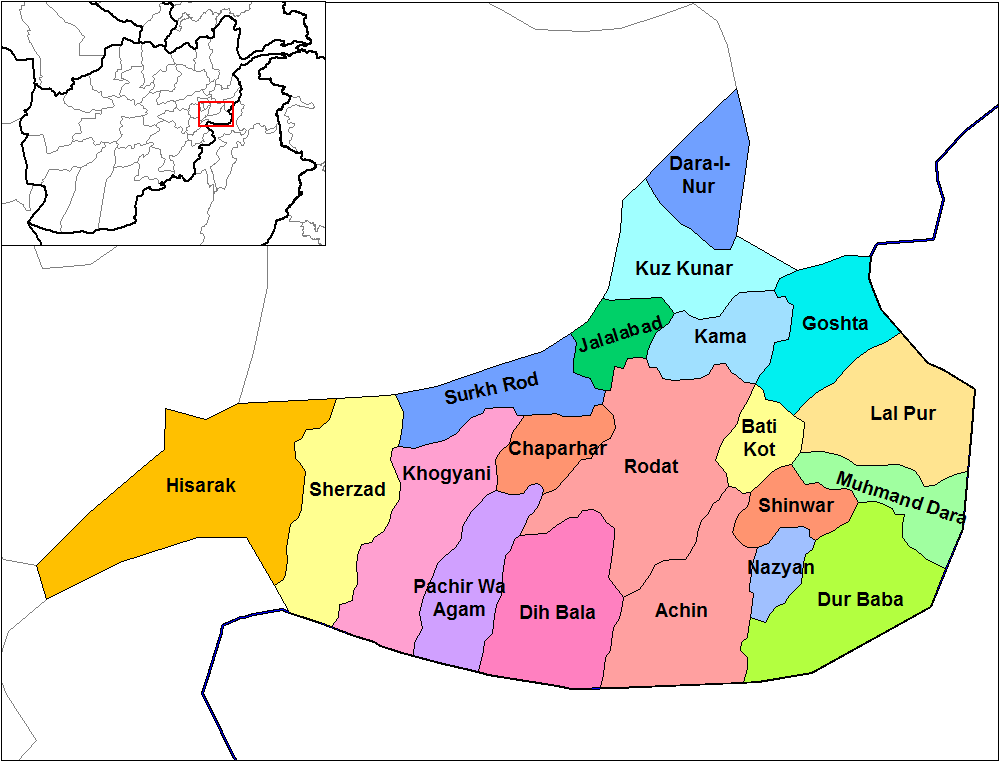
- Darai Nur District, Nangarhar Province.
- Country: Afghanistan
- Province: Nangarhar Province
- Capital: Darai Nur

Population (2002)
  - Total: 120,000
- Time zone: UTC+4:30 (Afghanistan Standard Time)

Darai Nur, Dara-i Noor or Darenur (Pashayi: دره نور) is a district in the north of Nangarhar Province, Afghanistan. Its population was estimated at 120,000 in 2002, of whom 28,000 were children under 12. The dominant language in the district is Pashayi and Pashto, although 99% of the district was Pashayi and 1% was Pashtun as of 2006.

The district centre is the village of Darai Nur. There are nine major villages and many smaller ones in the district. Some of the well-known villages in Darai Nur are Amla, Barkot, Khewa, Qalai Shahi, Sutan Lam, Nur Gal, and Kashmund. The Pashayi people refer to the district as a single word, darēnur.
