= Darai Nur =

Town in Nangarhar Province, Afghanistan

- Town
- Location
- Coordinates: 34.702778°N 70.601944°E
- Country: Afghanistan
- Province: Nangarhar
- District: Darai Nur
- Elevation: 2,106 m (6,909 ft)
- Time zone: +4:30

Darai Nur (Pashayi/Pashto: دره نور), Darra-i-Nur or Darēnur is a town in the Darai Nur District of Nangarhar Province, Afghanistan. It is located 45 km to the northeast of Jalalabad, the capital of Nangarhar. Darai Nur's residents speak a variant of Pashayi language, but are bilingual in Pashto.

== Climate ==
Darai Nur has a humid subtropical climate (Cfa) under the Köppen climate classification. The average temperature in Darai Nur is 12.2 °C, while the annual precipitation averages 1,049 mm. December is the driest month with 34 mm of precipitation, while July, the wettest month, has an average precipitation of 157 mm.

July is the hottest month of the year with an average temperature of 22.7 °C. The coldest month January has an average temperature of 0.3 °C.

Climate data for Darai Nur
Month	Jan	Feb	Mar	Apr	May	Jun	Jul	Aug	Sep	Oct	Nov	Dec	Year
Mean daily maximum °C (°F)	6.0 (42.8)	7.1 (44.8)	13.4 (56.1)	19.2 (66.6)	24.6 (76.3)	28.2 (82.8)	28.3 (82.9)	26.9 (80.4)	24.7 (76.5)	20.0 (68.0)	13.9 (57.0)	9.6 (49.3)	18.5 (65.3)
Daily mean °C (°F)	0.3 (32.5)	1.5 (34.7)	6.9 (44.4)	12.3 (54.1)	17.2 (63.0)	21.1 (70.0)	22.7 (72.9)	21.7 (71.1)	18.6 (65.5)	13.4 (56.1)	7.6 (45.7)	3.3 (37.9)	12.2 (54.0)
Mean daily minimum °C (°F)	−5.5 (22.1)	−4.2 (24.4)	0.4 (32.7)	5.3 (41.5)	9.7 (49.5)	13.9 (57.0)	17.0 (62.6)	16.4 (61.5)	12.4 (54.3)	6.7 (44.1)	1.2 (34.2)	−3.1 (26.4)	5.9 (42.5)
Average precipitation mm (inches)	60 (2.4)	92 (3.6)	128 (5.0)	134 (5.3)	88 (3.5)	63 (2.5)	157 (6.2)	144 (5.7)	69 (2.7)	42 (1.7)	38 (1.5)	34 (1.3)	1,049 (41.4)
Source: Climate-Data.org

== See also ==
- Nangarhar Province
