= Mihtarlam =

Mihtarlam مهترلام
- Provincial capital
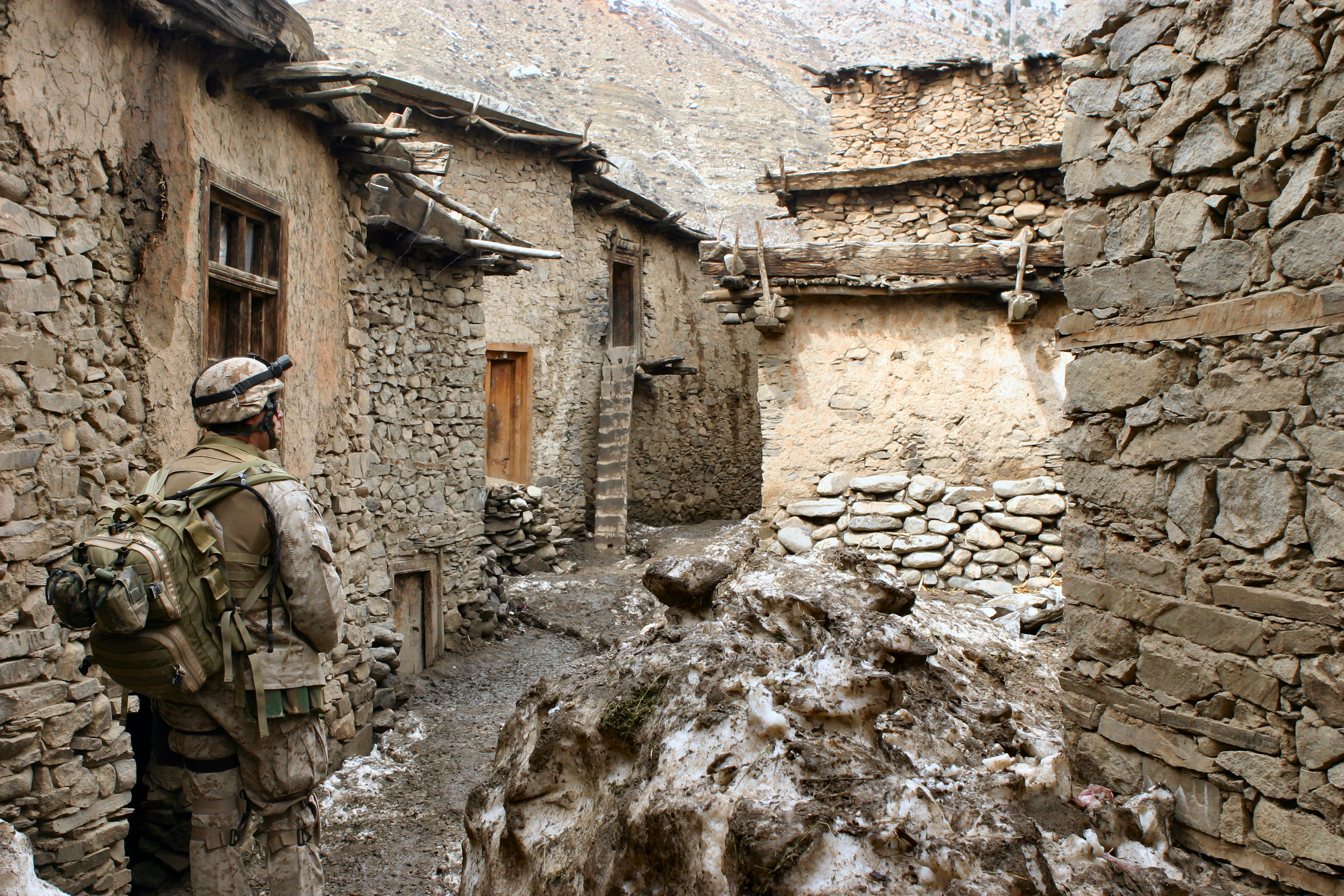
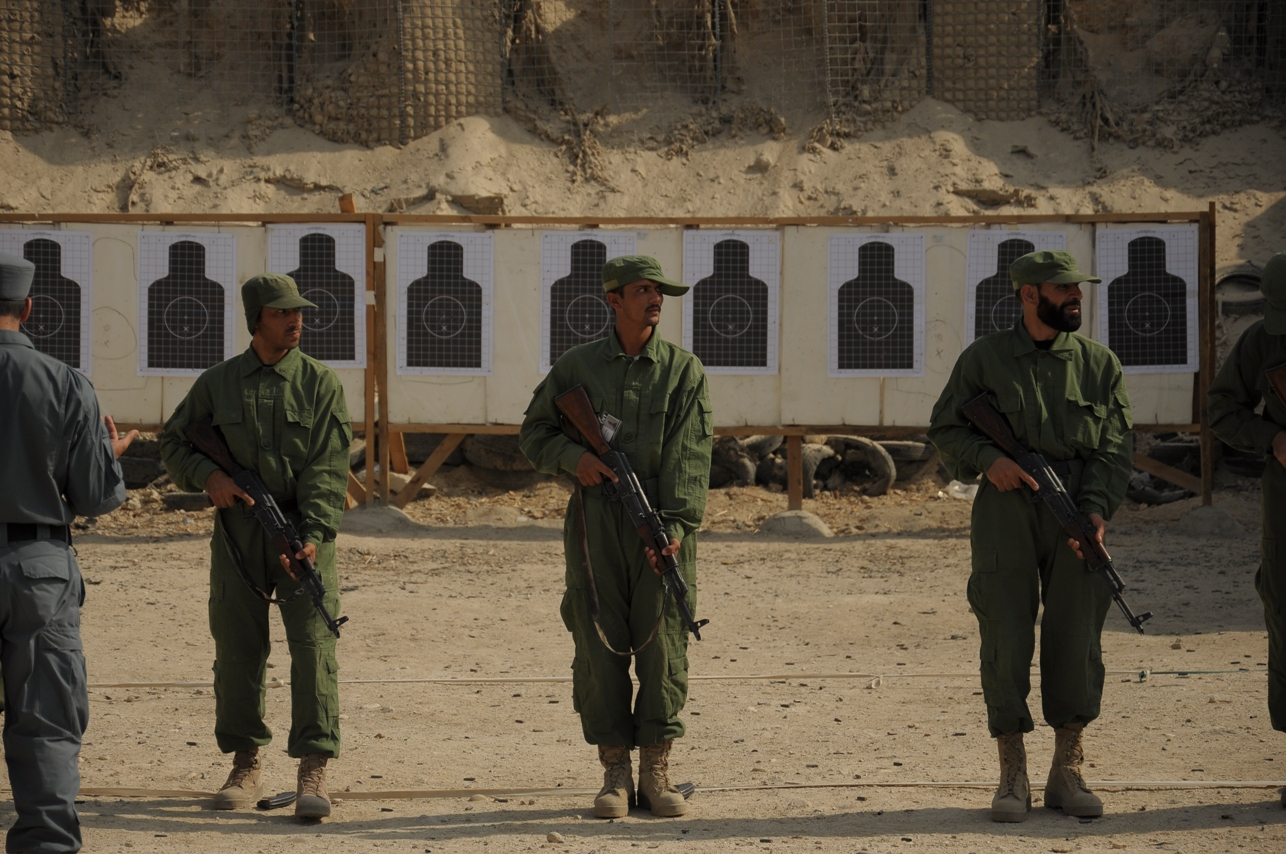
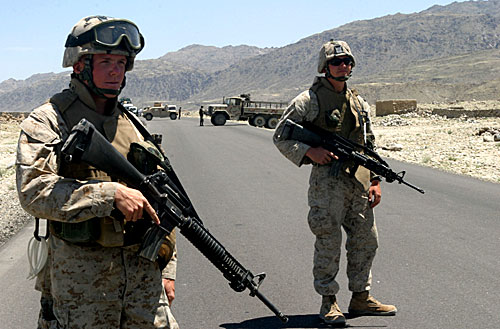
- Clockwise from top: An alley in Mehtarlam (2005); a highway checkpoint (2005); Mehtarlam RTC (2011)

- Location in Afghanistan
- Coordinates: 34°40′06″N 70°12′32″E
- Country: Afghanistan
- Province: Laghman
- District: Mehtarlam
- Named for: Lamech

Government
  - Type: Municipality
  - Mayor: Maulvi Obaidullah Saqib
- Elevation: 779 m (2,556 ft)

Population (2025)
  - Provincial capital: 160,123
  - Urban: 6,638
- Time zone: UTC+04:30 (Afghanistan Time)
- Climate: BSk

Mihtarlam (Pashto, (Note: Pashto pronunciation: [mi.t̪aɾ.lɑm, mih.t̪aɾ.lɑm]) Dari: (Note: Dari pronunciation: [mɪ.t̪ʰäɾ.lɑ́ːm, mɪh.t̪ʰäɾ.lɑ́ːm]) مهترلام), also spelled as Mehtarlam, is a city in eastern Afghanistan, serving as the capital of Laghman Province. It is within the jurisdiction of Mehtarlam District and has an estimated population of 160,123 people.

The city is situated in the valley formed by the Alishang and Alingar rivers, 47 km (29 mi) northwest of Jalalabad. There is a road between the cities that takes about an hour to travel by car. The Laghman University is in the northern part of the city, on university road.

== Etymology ==
Mehtarlam derives from mehtar, meaning “chief” in Persian, and lam, meaning “village” in Pashayi. This is sometimes rendered as ram, depending on the dialect. The name therefore means “village of chiefs”.

== History ==
Amir Habibullah Khan built Qala-e-Seraj c. 1912–13 in Mehtarlam.

On 6 February 2006, two people were killed by police in riots in Mihtarlam in events of the Jyllands-Posten Muhammad cartoons controversy.

On 26 February 2017, two students were killed and seven others wounded when a rocket landed in Shaheed Mawlawi Abdul Rahman School in Basram. On 14 April 2019, at least seven children were killed when unexploded ordnance detonated in Basram on the outskirts of Mihtarlam.

Local officials spent 22 million Afs to rebuild Qala-e-Seraj in 2020.

On 2 May 2020, a motorbike bomb exploded outside the provincial prison in Mehtarlam, killing three civilians and injuring four members of the Afghan security forces. Noor Mohammad, director of Laghman's provincial prison directorate, was among the injured. On 5 October 2020, Provincial Governor of Laghman, Rahmatullah Yarmal, was slightly wounded after his convoy was targeted by a suicide car bomber.

On 24 May 2021, Afghan government forces clashed with Taliban militants in Mihtarlam. On 13 August 2021, Mehtarlam was seized by Taliban fighters, becoming the twenty-third provincial capital to be captured as part of the wider 2021 Taliban offensive.

== Climate ==
Mihtarlam has a cold semi-arid climate (Köppen climate classification BSk).

== Places of interest ==
- Qala-e-Seraj
- Hajji Dunya Gul Niazi Jamia Masjid
- Laghman University
- The Tomb of Lamech is located in the area. Ghaznavid Sultan Mahmud of Ghazni built the shrine, amid gardens, over the site of his presumed grave, 50 kilometres from Mehtarlam.

== Sports ==
In 2021, the first stadium in Laghman opened in Mehtarlam.

== See also ==
- List of cities in Afghanistan
