= Kom people (Afghanistan) =

Nuristani tribe found in Afghanistan

Kom (Kam)
Regions with significant populations
- Nuristan, Afghanistan; Chitral, Pakistan

Languages
- Southeastern Katë

Religion
- Sunni Islam

Related ethnic groups
- Other Nuristanis, especially Kata

The Kom or Kam are a Nuristani tribe in Afghanistan and Pakistan.

Most used alternative names are Kamozi, Kamoz/Camoze, Caumojee/Kaumoji, and Camoje.

== History ==
Until the late 19th century, the Kom were a sub-group of the Siah-Posh Kafirs ("black-robed unbelievers") and their political (factional) headquarters was at Kombrom. They gave allegiance to the Mehtar (crown prince) of Chitral. At that time, following their conquest by Emir Abdur Rahman Khan, the Kom converted to Islam. Kafiristan ("Land of Unbelievers") was renamed Nuristan ("Land of Light") and its inhabitants became collectively known as Nuristanis (sometimes loosely translated as "enlightened ones").

== See also ==
- Nurestan
- Kamviri
- Kambojas
- Khmer people
