= Bashgal Valley =

Valley in Nuristan, Afghanistan

The Bashgal Valley, also known as Landai Sin Valley, is a valley in eastern Afghanistan, formed by the Landai Sin River which empties into the Kunar River at Barikot, Kamdesh District in Nuristan Province. The largest town in the valley is Kamdesh. The lower Bashgal Valley is inhabited by the Kom people.

== History ==
Before the signing of Durand Line Agreement, the Bashgal Valley formed a part of Kingdom of Chitral. Chitral was forced to cede it after 1892 to Afghanistan.

In the 1980s, Salafist cleric Mawlawi Afzal founded the Islamic Revolutionary State of Afghanistan in Landai Sin, which established consulates in Saudi Arabia and Pakistan.

== See also ==
- Asmar
