= Alishang =

Village, river, and valley in Afghanistan

- Village
- Location in Afghanistan
- Coordinates: 34°42′12″N 70°9′11″E
- Country: Afghanistan
- Province: Laghman
- District: Mihtarlam
- Elevation: 862 m (2,828 ft)
- Time zone: + 4.30

Alishang is the name of a village, a river and a fertile valley of Laghman Province, and also of the district headquarters of Mihtarlam District, in eastern Afghanistan. It lies about 40 km northwest of Jalalabad.

The fertile Alishang valley drained by the Alishang River, which is described as "contracted", has an abundance of mounds and caves. It is surrounded by Badrow hills. Alladad Khan castle is located close to the village. The Alishang River valley has a number of villages on the way from Jalalabad, such as Kargai, Tajak, Tigadee and Safees along its river course, which in some reaches is very narrow and can be forded by dismounting from the horse's back.

== Geography ==
Alishang village is on the banks of Alishang River, which is also called the Nadjil River. It rises in the mountains of Nadjil on the southern slopes of Hindukush mountains and after traversing 90 miles joins the Alinghar River in Alishang village. The valley and the river are both named as Alishang. Similarly, Alinghar River is also known as the Kow, which rises in the Hindukush mountains joins the Alishang River in Alishang. The Rhododendron Afghanicum was found in the Laghman Valley, northeast of Kabul.

Natural disasters

Alishang district (estimated population 139,000) as a whole under the Laghman Province is prone to natural disasters due to floods, snow and drought. During 2003–2004, the flood damage in the district was to agricultural land and crops, due to snow to animal life and also by drought.

Climate

Alishang has a humid subtropical climate (Köppen: Cfa) with hot summers and cool winters.

Climate data for Anjuman, Badakhshan Province
Month	Jan	Feb	Mar	Apr	May	Jun	Jul	Aug	Sep	Oct	Nov	Dec	Year
Daily mean °C (°F)	3.1 (37.6)	4.6 (40.3)	10.0 (50.0)	15.5 (59.9)	20.7 (69.3)	24.9 (76.8)	26.2 (79.2)	25.2 (77.4)	22.2 (72.0)	17.0 (62.6)	10.9 (51.6)	5.6 (42.1)	15.5 (59.9)
Average precipitation mm (inches)	27.9 (1.10)	58.4 (2.30)	65.3 (2.57)	62.8 (2.47)	50.7 (2.00)	24.6 (0.97)	61.8 (2.43)	76.1 (3.00)	32.5 (1.28)	15.4 (0.61)	17.3 (0.68)	9.5 (0.37)	502.3 (19.78)
Average relative humidity (%)	35	40	39	35	27	22	31	38	30	26	29	27	32
Source 1: ClimateCharts
Source 2: World Weather Online (precipitation & humidity)

== History ==
The earliest history is traced to the Mughal Emperor Babur. In the 1520s, Babur, while camping in Alishang, had hunted wildlife in the mountains of the Alishang valley before he returned to India. The place finds mention in Babur's writings and the people inhabiting the village are stated to be cantankerous and are given an epithet in the local language.

In the 1840s, the settlement was described as a "small walled-in town, of about four hundred houses, but has nothing remarkable in its appearance." This valley was in 1883 the westward limit of Kafiristan according to William Watts McNair.

In the war against the Soviets, Mujahideen forces who had taken shelter in the village were attacked. After initial set back and death of several soldiers and the local Mujahideen leader of Alishang, Mujahideen forces managed to defend the village. Soviets withdrew under fierce fighting in which the Mujahideen had superior firepower; both sides suffered many casualties. The local villagers provided help in many respects to the Mujahideen soldiers. In August 1981, the Mujahideen controlled the district centre of Alishang. In March 2011, the Taliban were reported to have attacked a US camp in the area.

In 2006, a new micro-hydro electrical power plant opened in Alishang, built at a cost of US$32,000 by the Methar Lam Provincial Reconstruction Team. The plant provides power to some 300 homes in the area.
