= Pashayi languages =

Group of Indo-Aryan languages spoken in Afghanistan

Pashayi
- Pashai
- زبان پشه‌ای (Dari) پشه اې ژبه (Pashto)
- Pashayi in Nastaliq
- Native to: Afghanistan
- Ethnicity: Pashayi
- Native speakers: (400,000 cited 2000–2011)
- Language family: Indo-European: Indo-Iranian; Indo-Aryan; Dardic; Pashayi
- Writing system: Arabic script (Nastaliq)

Language codes
- ISO 639-3: Variously: aee – Northeastern glh – Northwestern psi – Southeastern psh – Southwestern
- Glottolog: pash1270
- Linguasphere: 59-AAA-a
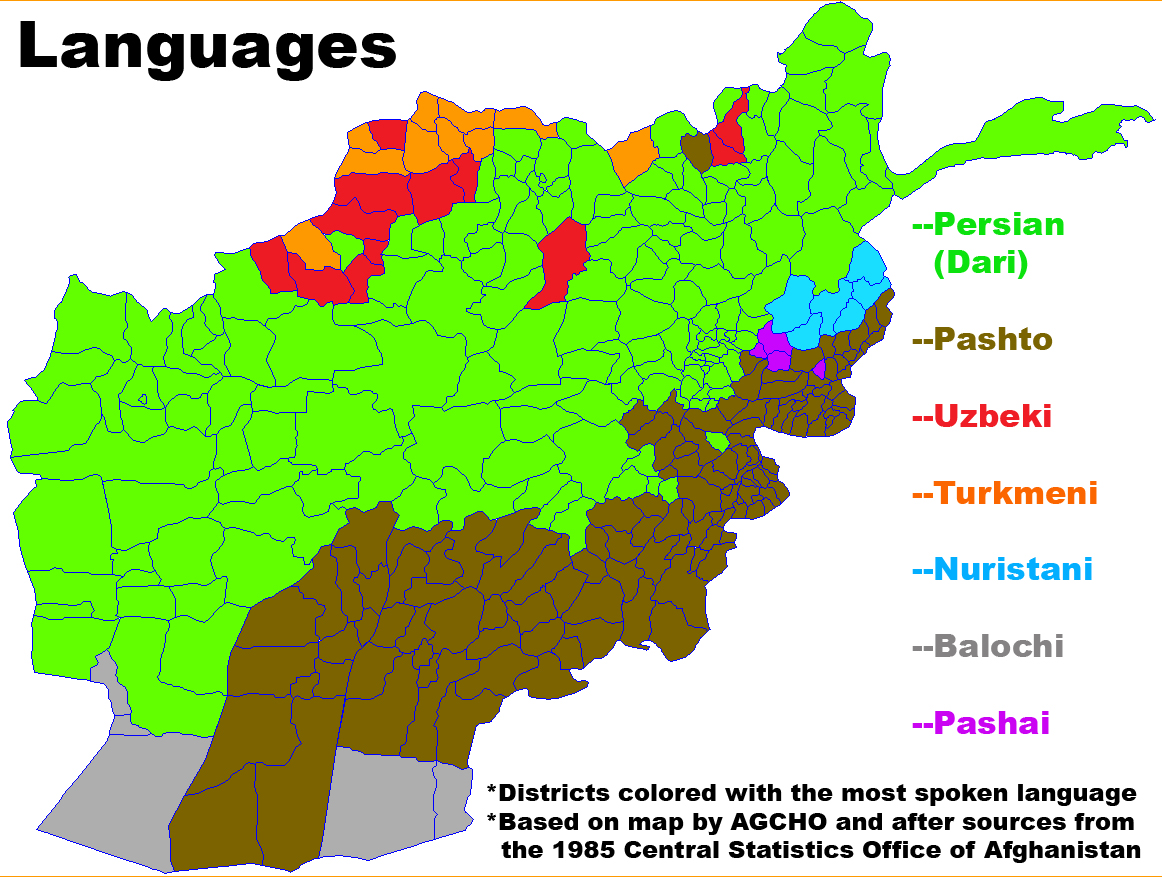
- Linguistic map of Afghanistan; Pashayi is spoken in the purple area in the east.

- Pashayi is classified as Vulnerable by the UNESCO Atlas of the World's Languages in Danger

Pashayi (or Pashai) is a group of Indo-Aryan languages spoken by the Pashayi people in parts of the Kapisa, Laghman, Nangarhar, Nuristan, Kunar, and Kabul (Surobi) provinces in northeastern Afghanistan.

The Pashayi languages had no known written form prior to 2003. There are four mutually unintelligible varieties, with only about a 30% lexical similarity:

- Northeastern: Aret, Chalas (Chilas), Kandak, Korangal, Kurdar dialects
- Northwestern: Alasai, Bolaghain, Gulbahar, Kohnadeh, Laurowan, Najil, Nangarach, Pachagan, Pandau, Parazhghan, Pashagar, Sanjan, Shamakot, Shutul, Uzbin, Wadau dialects
- Southeastern: Damench, Laghmani, Sum, Upper and Lower Darai Nur, Wegali dialects
- Southwestern: Ishpi, Isken, Tagau dialects

A grammar of the language was written as a doctoral dissertation in 2014.

== Phonology ==
=== Consonants ===
Pashayi consonants
		Labial	Dental/ Alveolar	Palato- alveolar	Retroflex	Dorsal	Glottal
Nasal		m	n		ɳ	ŋ	
Plosive	voiceless	p	t̪		ʈ	k	
Plosive	voiced	b	d̪		ɖ	ɡ	
Affricate	voiceless			t͡ʃ			
Affricate	voiced			d͡ʒ			
Fricative	voiceless		s	ʃ	(ʂ)	x	(h)
Fricative	voiced		z	ʒ	(ʐ)	ɣ	
Fricative	lateral		ɬ				
Rhotic	tap		ɾ		ɽ		
Rhotic	trill		r				
Approximant	lateral		l				
Approximant	central	ʋ ~ w				j	

- [h] is only phonemic in the Amla dialect.
- Sounds [f] and [q] can also occur, but only in loanwords and among Dari speakers.
- [ʂ] is more commonly heard among older speakers, but is lost among younger speakers, and is heard as a postalveolar [ʃ].
- [ʐ] is more commonly heard among older speakers, but is lost among younger speakers, and is heard as a postalveolar [ʒ].
- /ʋ/ is heard before front vowels /i e/. When occurring before or after central or back vowels /a u o/, it is heard as [w].
- According to Masica (1991) some dialects have a /θ/.

=== Vowels ===
Pashayi vowels
	Front	Central	Back
High	i		u
Mid	e eː		o oː
Low		a aː	

- Only mid or low vowels have lengthened equivalents.
- /e/ can be heard as [ɛ] and /a/ can be heard as [ə] or [æ], in certain environments.
