= Alingar River =

Left tributary of Kabul River in the east of Afghanistan

Coordinates: 34°36′N 70°04′E

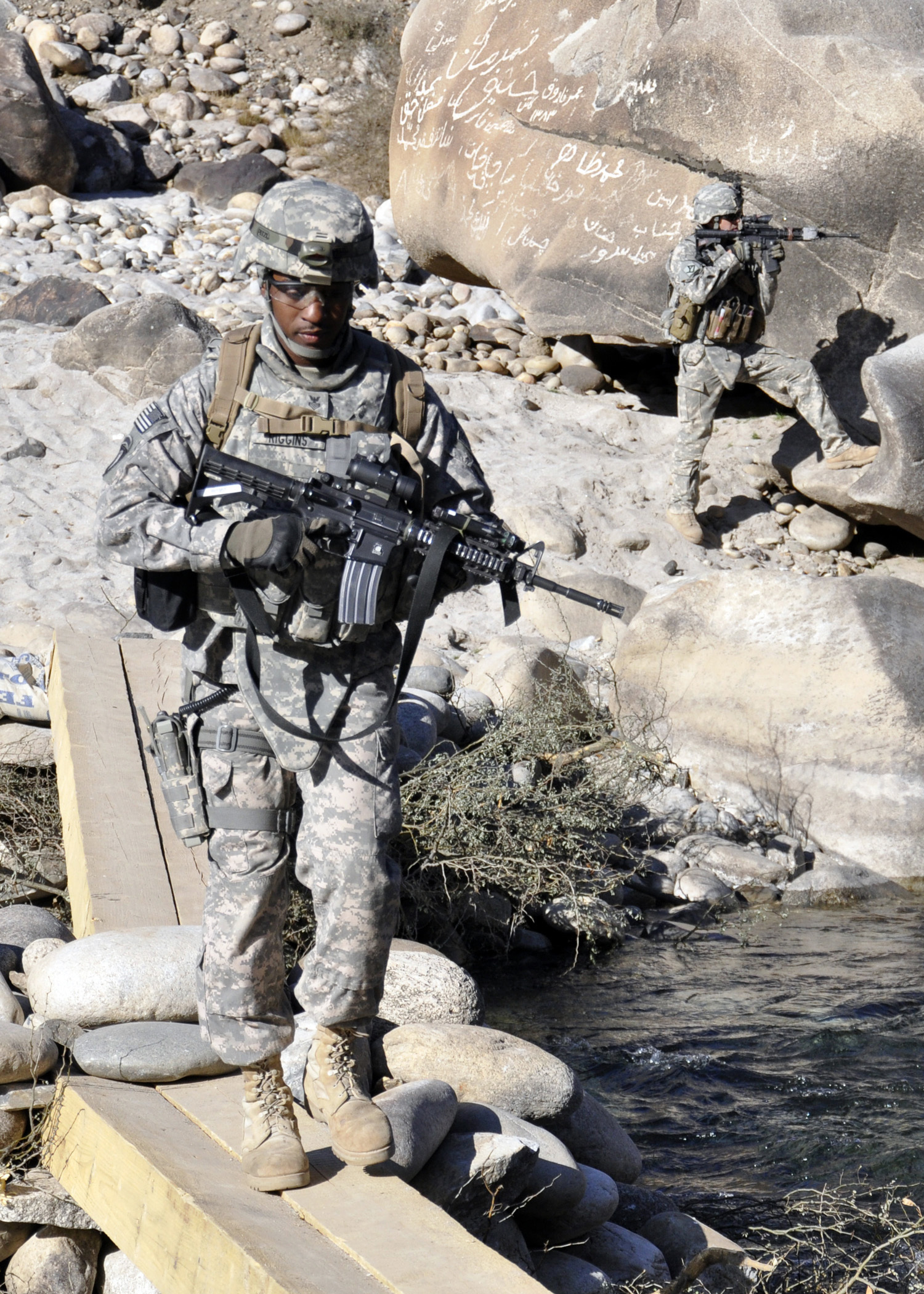
A soldier crossing a temporary bridge on the Alingar River

The Alingar River (also Alingâr) in Laghman Province of Afghanistan is one of the major tributaries of the Kabul River, and part of the Indus River basin. It has two sources, the Ramgel and Kulem rivers.

It gives its name to Alingar District as well as to Alingar Valley in which that district is located. It also flows through Mihtarlam in Mihtarlam District.

== See also ==
- Kabul River topics
