= Much Sounding of Bugles =

War novel about British colonialists in India

Much Sounding of Bugles: The Siege of Chitral 1895
- First edition
- Author: John Harris
- Language: English
- Published: 1975
- Publisher: Hutchinson
- Publication place: London
- Media type: (Hardback)
- Pages: 248

Much Sounding of Bugles: The Siege of Chitral 1895 is a book written by John Harris and originally published by Hutchinson & Co. Publishers Ltd. at London in 1975. The book presents a vivid chronicle of the Chitral Campaign and the heroic efforts of the British Indian Army in 1895. It narrates how Queen Victoria rules over nearly a quarter of the Earth's land surface, with the brightest jewel in her crown being India. Yet the might of the Raj is not to go unchallenged in the high mountains of the Hindu Kush. The State of Chitral which had till then existed as a buffer between British and Russian spheres of influence and tilted towards the Government of India in the second half of the 19th century, with the death of the Mehtar of Chitral in 1892 descends into civil war. A small British force led by Surgeon-Major George Scott Robertson is caught up in the Fort at Chitral which was to come under siege for seven weeks while a relief force was organised. The book narrates the follies of a vanished age.

== Overview ==
Following the death of the Chief of Chitral Aman ul-Mulk in 1892, power in the state changes hands several times in the next few years. In early 1895, when it seems that the situation is finally coming back to normalcy the reigning Chief is murdered and conflict over the succession once again erupts. A small British force ends up being besieged in the Chitral Fort. The book presents a graphic account of the build up and the actual siege before elucidating how it is lifted. The intervention of Umra Khan a Pathan Chief, during this period of uncertainty, brings an unexpectedly large hostile forces on the scene. The British force at Chitral fights the invaders but are heavily outnumbered and forced to retreat into the Chitral Fort. The besieged forces then spend a month and a half defending an aging fort with rationed supplies and limited ammunition.

Meanwhile two forces are dispatched to relieve the siege. An army of some 15,000 under the command of General Sir Robert Low set out from near Peshawar, fighting battle along the way, when met with resistance from the locals. Another smaller army under the command of Colonel James Graves Kelly marches from Gilgit over the Shandur Pass, bringing with it two mountain guns as it marches through the snow and a series of defiles.

The author switches between the different fronts to maintain suspense and generally tells a good story. John Harris offers a glimpses of the Great Game, an old-fashioned defense of British imperialism, and repetition of contemporary clichés.
