= James Robb Fraser =

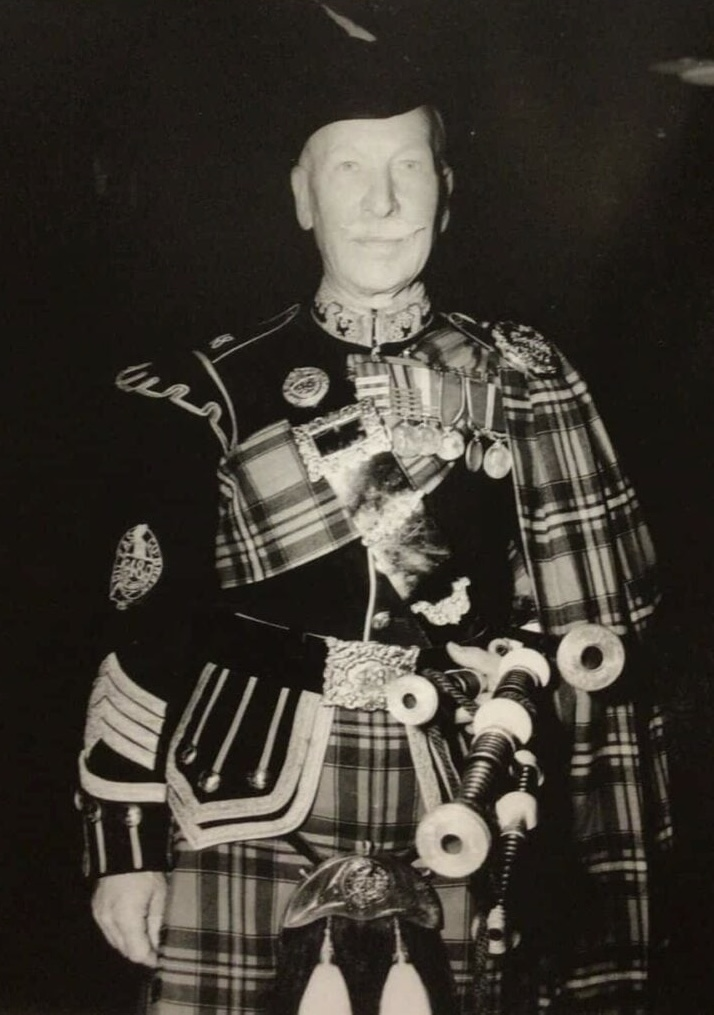
- Pipe Major Fraser, c.1930s
- Born: September 12, 1874; Keith, Banffshire, Scotland
- Died: July 18, 1963 (aged 89); Toronto, Ontario, Canada
- Military career
- Allegiance: Great Britain; Canada
- Branch: British Army; Canadian Army
- Service years: 1892–1913; 1913–1952
- Rank: Pipe Major
- Units: Gordon Highlanders; 48th Highlanders of Canada
- Conflicts: Chitral Expedition; Battle of Malakand Pass; Tirah Campaign; Battle of Dargai (WIA); Second Boer War; Battle of Magersfontein; Battle of Paardeberg; Battle of Driefontein; Battle of Doornkop

James Robb Fraser (September 12, 1874 – July 18, 1963) was a Scottish-Canadian bagpiper and soldier, who was one of the premier Pipe Majors in Canada.

== Early life ==
James Fraser was born in Keith, Scotland, to John Fraser and Elizabeth Milne. On August 1, 1892, he enlisted as a private in the 1st Battalion, Gordon Highlanders. He was appointed a Piper and proceeded with the regiment to India in 1894.

With the Gordons he fought in the Chitral Campaign in 1895, and in the Tirah Campaign in 1897. During the Battle of Dargai, when Piper Findlater was wounded, Fraser heroically took up his pipes and played the regiment to the top of the heights before also being wounded in the leg.

Fraser then served with the Gordons in South Africa from 1899 to 1902, fighting throughout the whole Second Boer War. In 1903 he returned to Scotland and joined the 3rd Battalion, Gordon Highlanders, rising to the rank of Pipe Major.

== Canada’s Pipe Major ==
In 1913, Fraser was convinced by Col. William Hendrie to immigrate to Canada, and serve as Pipe Major of his regiment. He quickly sailed to Toronto and joined the Canadian Militia, becoming Pipe Major of the 48th Highlanders of Canada Pipes & Drums. Fraser served as Pipe Major from 1913 until 1952.

As Pipe Major he trained and sent three bands overseas during the First World War, and during the Second World War he trained the first band to land in Europe.

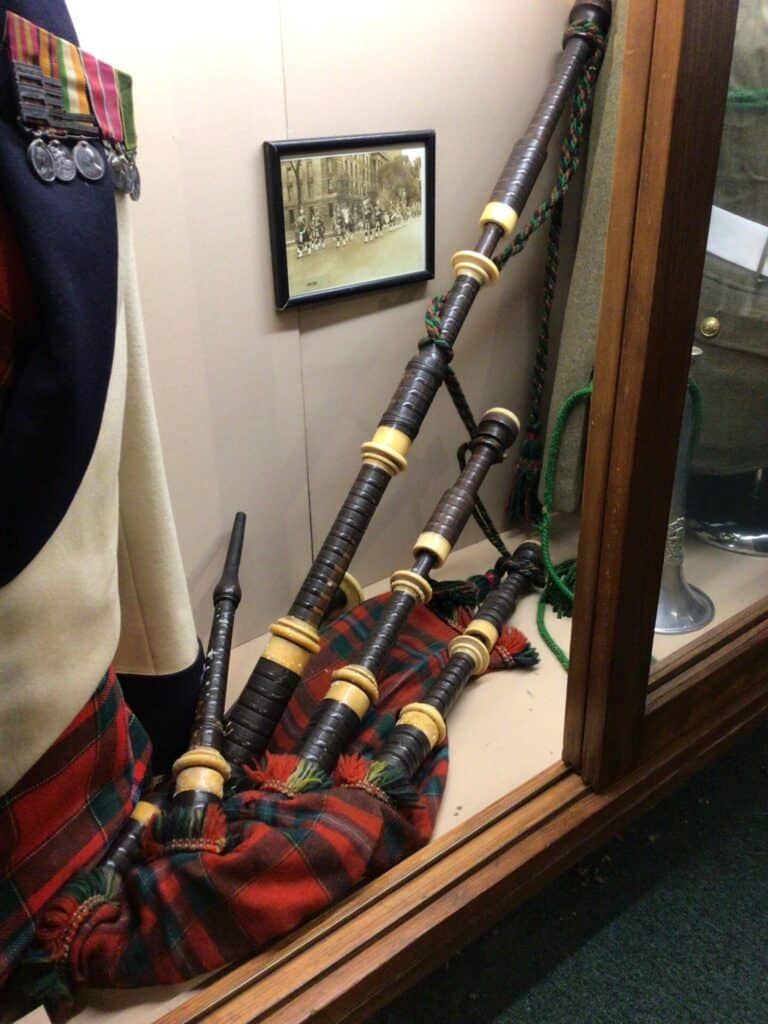
Display of pipes and medals belonging to Fraser at the 48th Highlanders Museum

Pipe Major Fraser, along with Charles Dunbar, was widely considered one of the top Piping instructors in Canada, and the band of the 48th Highlanders was one of the best in the commonwealth. Due to his success and prominence, Fraser was known as “Canada’s Pipe Major”.

Fraser was approached by St. Andrew's College to found their Cadet Corps Pipes and Drums in 1915, and he served as instructor for the college until the 1950s.

When Maple Leaf Gardens was opened in 1931, Fraser and the Band of the 48th Highlanders performed for the home opener of the Toronto Maple Leafs, a tradition that continues to this day.

== Later life ==
Fraser married Jane Mellis in 1908 and Isobel Taylor in 1932.

He retired from the Canadian Army in 1952, having served almost a full 60 years in the Army, and died in Toronto on July 18, 1963.

== Awards and decorations ==

India Medal	*Relief of Chitral 1895; *Punjab Frontier 1897-98; *Tirah 1897-98
Queen's South Africa Medal	*Cape Colony; *Paardeberg; *Driefontein; *Johannesburg; *Belfast
King's South Africa Medal	*South Africa 1901; *South Africa 1902
King George V Silver Jubilee Medal	
Army Long Service and Good Conduct Medal	Edward VII version
Efficiency Medal	Canada version
