= Chitral; the Story of a Minor Siege =

1898 book by George Scott Robertson

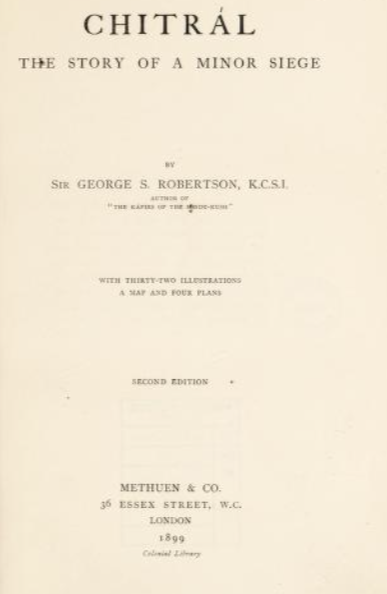
- Title page for Chitral; the Story of a Minor Siege (1899)
- Author: Sir George Scott Robertson
- Language: English
- Subject: Siege of Chitral
- Published: 1898
- Publication place: London, England
- Media type: (Hardback)
- Pages: 368

Chitral; the Story of a Minor Siege is a book written by Sir George Scott Robertson on the Siege of Chitral and published by Methuen Publishing in 1898.

== Overview ==
The book presents an account of Chitral's growing geographical significance during the Great Game and the British Government's policy towards the northernmost frontier of India. However much of the book recounts the events leading to the Siege of Chitral, followed by the siege and how it was lifted. The book presents an in-depth analysis of the march by Colonel Kelly from Gilgit over the snow covered Shandur Pass and that of General Sir Robert Low from the south.

== Description ==
The book recounts how Chitral is a remote but strategically placed state stretching over 250 miles, high in the Hindu Kush. For well over three decades the state was ruled by Mehtar Aman ul-Mulk who had fostered friendly relations with the British. On 30 August 1892 the much aged Aman ul-Mulk suddenly died igniting a bloody war of succession which climaxes in 1895. The same year Surgeon-Major George Scott Robertson, recently appointed Political Agent by the British, arrived in Chitral.

Shortly thereafter two groups representing different claimants for the right to rule arrived in Chitral. Sir George Robertson with the aid of a small British force managed to take control of the Chitral Fort but he and the forces were soon placed under siege by the native forces from the outside, and held as hostages. When news of the events reached Calcutta, the British High Command approved a military operation to lift the siege. One military group under the command of General Sir Robert Low with an accumulative strength of 15,000 strong left from the south (Peshawar) towards Chitral whereas the second smaller group commanded by Colonel Kelly marched from the north (Gilgit) towards the besieged. The march of the two forces eventually drove away the rival groups claiming power and Shuja ul-Mulk the youngest son of Aman ul-Mulk was recognised as the Mehtar. The march of the two forces in addition to lifting the Siege of Chitral enabled the British to establish their hold over Swat, Dir and Gupis. For his heroic services the author of the book George Scott Robertson was made Knight Commander of the Order of the Star of India by Queen Victoria.
