= The Relief of Chitral =

19th-century book on military history

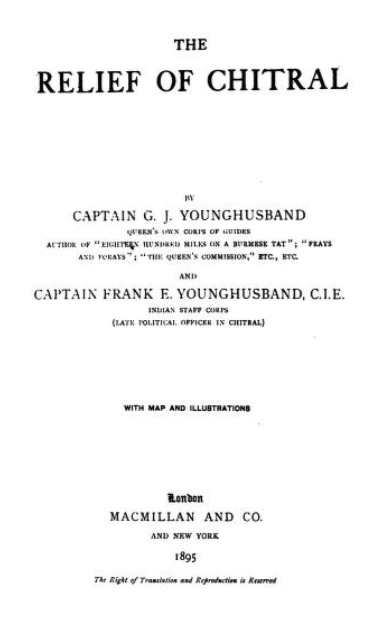
- Title page for The Relief of Chitral (1895)
- Author: Sir George Younghusband; Sir Francis Younghusband
- Language: English
- Subject: Siege of Chitral
- Published: 1895
- Publication place: London, England
- Media type: (Hardback)
- Pages: 259

The Relief of Chitral is a book on the Siege of Chitral written by two brothers namely Major General Sir George John Younghusband and Lieutenant Col. Sir Francis Edward Younghusband and published by Macmillan Publishers in 1895.

== Record of the book ==
Both the authors were acting as correspondents for The Times in 1895 when the Chitral Expedition was dispatched. The record of the book is based on The Gazette of India, The Blue Book on Chitral affairs presented to the Houses of Parliament in England and correspondence by the authors with The Times.

== Description of the work ==
The book is divided into nine chapters starting with the causes of the civil war in Chitral and ending with an overview of the situation following the success of the relief forces.

The book narrates in detail how the death of Chitrals ageing Chief Aman ul-Mulk in 1892 caused uncertain conditions in the region, leading to mutual strife amongst his heirs for the next couple of years. The year 1895 was very eventful and saw the Siege of Chitral with a small British Force trapped inside the Chitral Fort. To rescue the personnel trapped inside and to restore British morale two expeditions; one commanded by Lieutenant Colonel James Graves Kelly from the north and another commanded by General Sir Robert Low from the south was dispatched to lift the siege.

The book is written in conjunction by Sir Francis Younghusband, formerly political officer at Chitral, and during the campaign correspondent of the Times, and his brother, Sir George Younghusband, who was with his regiment in General Low's force throughout the whole affair. The book is a first-hand account of events.
