= Culture of Gilgit-Baltistan =

The culture of Gilgit-Baltistan, Pakistan includes the cultural practices, customs and traditions of various ethnic groups inhabiting the region, and shows diverse influences from the neighbouring areas, including Tibet, Central Asia, Indus Valley and West Asia. Gilgit-Baltistan has its own unique cuisine, traditional attire, sports and music.

== Dress ==
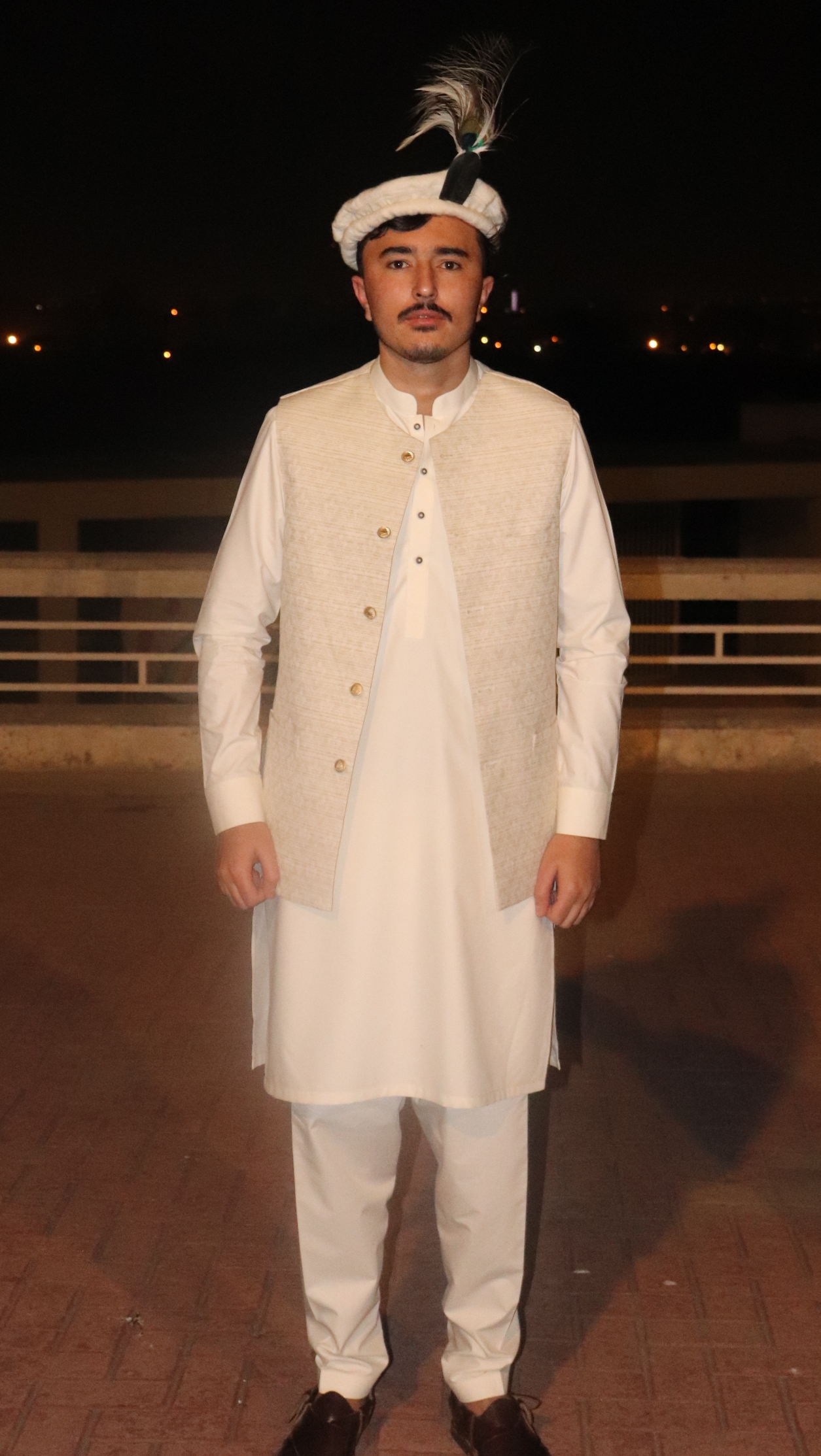
A man from Gilgit-Baltistan wearing the traditional pakol hat with a feather, and Pakistani shalwar kameez with a sherwani

=== Men's dress ===
Men usually wear:

- Woollen hat
- Shalwar kameez
- Woollen robe with long or short sleeve

=== Women's dress ===
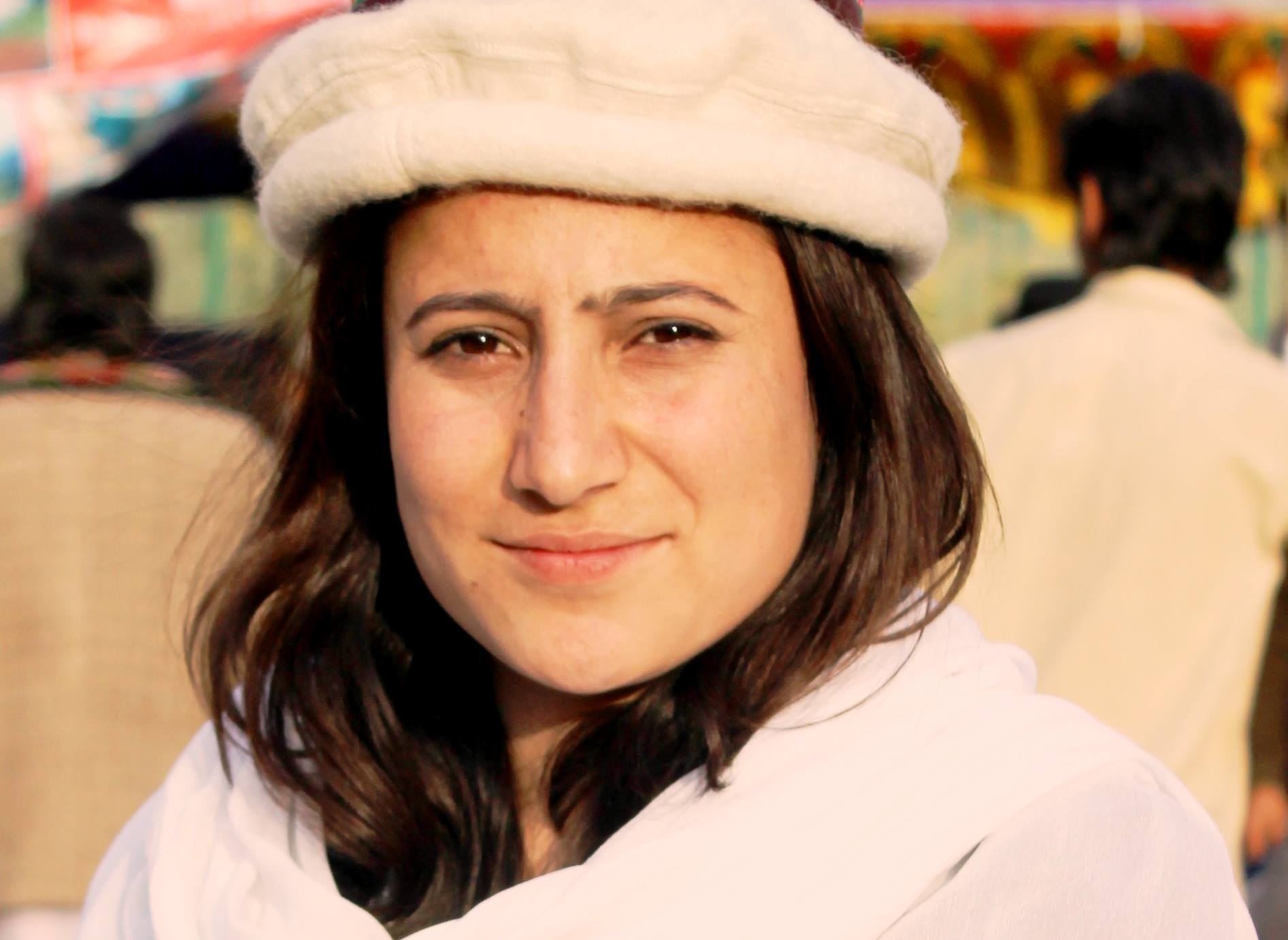
A woman from Gilgit-Baltistan wearing the traditional cap

The most elegant part of women's dress is the traditional cap. Women usually wear:

- Iraghi cap
- Loose shalwar kameez
- Colorful frock

The most popular cap is the beautiful embroidered Iraghi cap with the traditional piece of the jewel called silsila. Many other types of caps are used in various regions. The customs of wearing caps is also common in Gilgit Baltistan, especially during events like bridal makeup.

The cap's design is slightly different in Baltistan and is called Nating in Balti. Before it is fitted and worn, the traditional pakol hat resembles a bag with a round, flat bottom. The wearer rolls up the sides nearly to the top, forming a thick band, which then rests on the head like a beret or cap.

== Sports ==
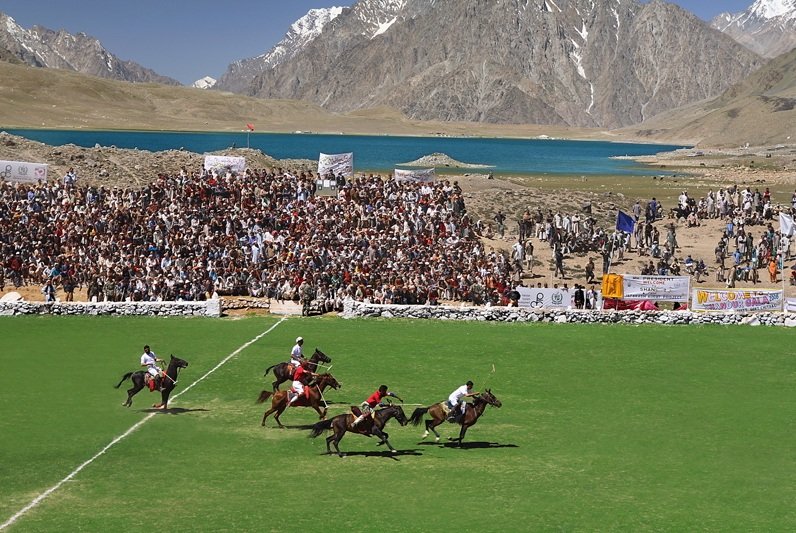
A polo match being played at Shandur Polo Ground in Ghizer, Gilgit-Baltistan

Polo is the most popular sport in Gilgit-Baltistan.
