= Wanklyn =

Wanklyn is a surname. Notable people with the surname include:

- James Alfred Wanklyn, nineteenth-century English chemist
- James Leslie Wanklyn, Liberal MP for Bradford Central
- Malcolm David Wanklyn, recipient of the Victoria Cross
