= With Kelly to Chitral =

1896 book by William George Lawrence Beynon

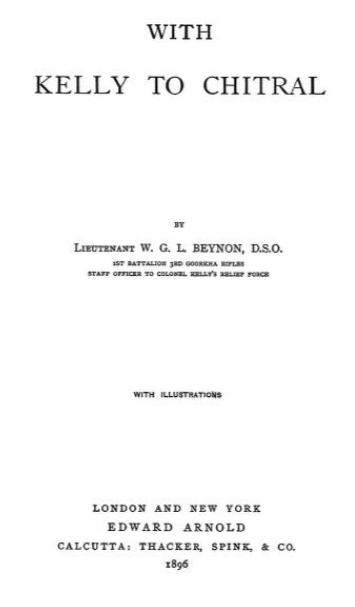
- Title page for With Kelly to Chitral (1896)
- Author: Major General Sir William George Lawrence Beynon
- Language: English
- Published: 1896
- Publication place: London
- Media type: (Hardback)
- Pages: 189

With Kelly to Chitral is a book written by Major General Sir William George Laurence Beynon and originally published by Edward Arnold Publishers Ltd at 37 Bedford Street London in 1896.

In 1895, the author was a 29-year-old lieutenant and acted as Staff Officer to Colonel James Graves Kelly, who marched in heavy snow from Gilgit over the Shandur Pass to lift the Siege of Chitral. With Kelly to Chitral provides significant insight into the daily life of British Indian Army Officers and Indian troops on a frontier expeditions.
