= Battle of Malakand Pass =

1895 battle between a British expeditionary force and Chitrali tribesmen

- Part of the Chitral Expedition
Date	3 April 1895
Location	Malakand Pass, British India
Result	British victory

Belligerents
(United Kingdom) British Empire: United Kingdom; British Raj	Tribesmen

Commanders and leaders
(United Kingdom) Maj. Gen. Robert Low (United Kingdom) Brig. Gen. Bindon Blood	Umra Khan

Units involved
1st Gordon Highlanders; 1st Bedford Regiment; 37th Dogras; Pro-British Chitralis	Tribesmen

Strength
c. 16,000	12,000+ tribesmen

The Battle of Malakand Pass pass took place in the Malakand Pass between a British expeditionary force commanded by Robert Low, a General of the British Indian Army against tribal Chitralis during the Chitral Expedition.
