= Sir James Hill, 1st Baronet =

Sir James Hill, 1st Baronet (11 March 1849 – 17 January 1936) was a British Liberal Party politician.

He was founder of Sir James Hill and Son, wool merchants in 1891 and was elected Lord Mayor of Bradford for 1908–09. He was elected unopposed as member of parliament (MP) for Bradford Central at a by-election in 1916, following the death of the Liberal MP Sir George Scott Robertson. He was made a baronet in January 1917, of Bradford, but at the 1918 general election the "coalition coupon" went to his Conservative Party opponent Henry Butler Ratcliffe, who won the seat. After his defeat, Hill did not stand for Parliament again.

He died in 1936. He had married Alice Knight, daughter of Joshua Knight and was succeeded by their son Albert.

Parliament of the United Kingdom
Preceded by Sir George Scott Robertson	Member of Parliament for Bradford Central; 1916 – 1918	Succeeded by Henry Butler Ratcliffe
Baronetage of the United Kingdom
New creation	Baronet (of Bradford); 1917–1936	Succeeded by Albert Hill
