= Chitrali Bazaar =

Chitrali Bazaar چترالی بازار
- Bazaar
- Country: Pakistan
- Province: Khyber Pakhtunkhwa
- City: Peshawar

Chitrali Bazaar (Urdu: چترالی بازار) is a bazaar located in the city of Peshawar, Pakistan. The handicrafts available at Chitrali Bazaar include traditional apparel, jewelry, pottery, and textiles. The market is a destination for both tourists and locals.

Common items at the market include traditional Chitrali caps, which are crafted from wool obtained in the area and include elaborate stitching. The hats are available in several styles and hues.

== History ==
The bazaar is named after Chitralis.
