= Maurice Webb (politician) =

British politician

Webb

Maurice Webb PC (26 September 1904 – 10 June 1956) was a British Labour Party politician.

Webb joined the Labour Party in 1922 as a teenager, and was a well-known political journalist; including for the Daily Herald. From 1929 to 1935, he worked as the Labour Party's communications officer. He was also a broadcast commentator and a member of the executive of the National Union of Journalists.

Webb was elected as the Member of Parliament (MP) for Bradford Central in the 1945 general election. He served as the Chairman of the Parliamentary Labour Party from 1946 to 1950. In 1949, he intervened to delay Brian Close's National Service so the eighteen-year-old Close could complete the cricket season playing for Yorkshire County Cricket Club. In 1950, he was appointed as Minister of Food, a key role in a time of rationing, and was appointed as a Privy Councillor. After his Bradford Central seat was abolished for the 1955 general election, he contested Bradford North but narrowly lost to the sitting Conservative MP.

He died on 10 June 1956, aged 51.

Parliament of the United Kingdom
Preceded by William Leach	Member of Parliament for Bradford Central; 1945–1955	Constituency abolished
Political offices
Preceded by John Strachey	Minister of Food; 1950–1951	Succeeded by Gwilym Lloyd George
