= The Kafirs of the Hindu Kush =

1896 book by George Scott Robertson

- Title page for The Kafirs of the Hindu Kush (1896)
- Author: Sir George Scott Robertson
- Language: English
- Published: 1896
- Publication place: London, U.K.
- Media type: (Hardback)

The Kafirs of the Hindu Kush is a book written by Sir George Scott Robertson, illustrated by Arthur David McCormick, and published in 1896 by Lawrence & Bullen Ltd.

== Significance and narrative ==
Sir George Scott Robertson was the first Victorian to travel into Kafiristan and recounted the experience of his adventures in his book The Kafirs of the Hindu Kush published in 1896. The book dispelled many popular fictions about the Kafirs, their customs and their lineage. The Kafirs of the Hindu Kush was the first book which brought the inhabitants of Kafiristan and their animism to the attention of the West. The book still provides a classical description of the way of life of the Kafirs before their mass conversion by Amir Abdur Rahman Khan of Afghanistan. The book sheds light upon the Kafirs extensive use of timber, elaborate carvings and spectacular sites literally clinging to the sides of steep mountains.
