= William Leach (politician) =

British Labour Party politician (1870–1949)

William Leach (1870 – 21 November 1949) was a British Labour Party politician.

He was elected as Member of Parliament (MP) for Bradford Central at the 1922 general election, having unsuccessfully contested the seat in 1918. He was re-elected in 1923, and served as Under-Secretary of State for Air in the First Labour Government.

Leach lost the seat at the 1924 general election to his Conservative party opponent. His share of the vote had increased, but the absence for the first time of a Liberal Party candidate proved more beneficial to the Conservatives. He was re-elected to the House of Commons at the 1929 general election, but was defeated again when the Labour Party split at the 1931 general election. He regained the seat at the 1935 general election, and represented Bradford Central for a decade until retiring from politics at the 1945 general election.

Parliament of the United Kingdom
Preceded by Henry Butler Ratcliffe	Member of Parliament for Bradford Central; 1922 – 1924	Succeeded by Anthony Gadie
Preceded by Anthony Gadie	Member of Parliament for Bradford Central; 1929 – 1931	Succeeded by George Eady
Preceded by George Eady	Member of Parliament for Bradford Central; 1935 – 1945	Succeeded by Maurice Webb
Political offices
Preceded by The Duke of Sutherland	Under-Secretary of State for Air; 1924	Succeeded by Sir Philip Sassoon, Bt.
