= Royal Commission on the Depressed Condition of the Agricultural Interests (1894–1897) =

The Royal Commission on the Depressed Condition of the Agricultural Interests was appointed by William Ewart Gladstone's Liberal government in 1894 to inquire into the depression in British agriculture. It was chaired by George Shaw-Lefevre and sat until 1897.

The commission unanimously agreed that the cause of the depression was a fall in prices. However its second report was divided between a majority report and a minority report. The majority report discussed government loans to agriculture, local rates and the land tax. The minority report recommended landlord-tenant agreements, lowering rents and railway rates, co-operation to eliminate the middleman. They claimed this was all that could be done "short of tampering with the currency, debasing the gold standard, or adopting protective duties".

In April 1896 Shaw-Lefevre resigned as chairman and was replaced by Lord Cobham. The Final Report of 1897 was divided between a majority report and two minority reports.
