= 1916 Bradford Central by-election =

1916 United Kingdom by-election for Bradford Central

G.S. Robertson

The 1916 Bradford Central by-election was held on 21 January 1916. The by-election was held due to the death of the incumbent Liberal MP, Sir George Scott Robertson. It was won by the Liberal candidate James Hill, who was unopposed.
