= George Hathaway-Eady =

British politician (1865–1941)

George Hathaway-Eady (1865 – 1 September 1941) was a British Conservative Party politician who served in the House of Commons as the Member of Parliament (MP) for Bradford Central from 1931 to 1935.

Eady won the marginal Bradford Central seat on his first attempt, at the 1931 general election, defeating the sitting Labour Party MP William Leach on a swing of 20.4%. However, Leach re-gained the seat at the 1935 general election, and after his defeat Eady did not stand for Parliament again.

Parliament of the United Kingdom
Preceded by William Leach	Member of Parliament for Bradford Central; 1931 – 1935	Succeeded by William Leach
