= Pakol =

Soft round-topped hat from Pakistan

The pakol (Urdu: پکول; Shina and Khowar: پاکول) is a traditional soft, flat, rolled-up and round-topped cap originating from the Gilgit and Chitral areas in northern Pakistan. It is typically made of wool and found in a variety of earthy colours, such as brown, black, grey, ivory, or dyed red using walnut. Today it is widely worn in Pakistan, the eastern region of Afghanistan, and parts of northern India.

== Etymology ==
The name of cap is from Khowar pak^{h}óɫ (also pronounced p^{h}akóɫ, with aspiration on first syllable, and kap^{h}oóɫ with metathesis), literally men's cap.

== Description ==
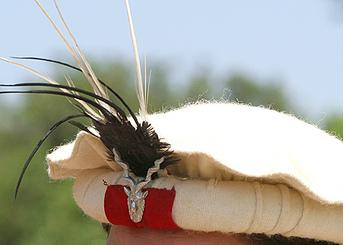
Pakol hat of the Chitral Scouts

A Wakhi man in Hunza, Gilgit-Baltistan, Pakistan, wearing pakol.

The pakol is a hand spun woollen cap, formed with a flat, rounded top, encircled by a lower, curled-up brim. It is usually white, grey, or various shades of brown. The cap's practical design allows pulling it down to cover the ears and neck in cold weather and rolling it up for warmer temperatures. There are many ways of decorating the garment, sometimes by putting flowers or feathers into the hat, especially for festive occasions. An attached string sewn around the base provides adaptability, allowing the wearer to secure the cap by tightening or loosening it as needed.

== Origins and history ==
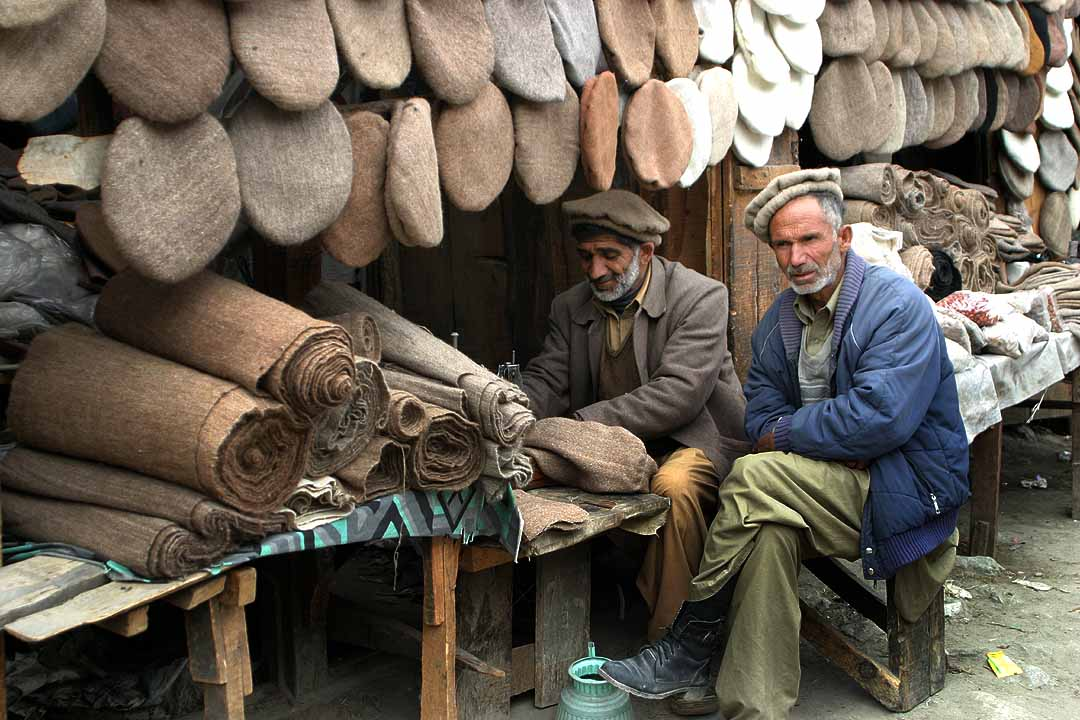
Craftsmen selling pakol in Gilgit-Baltistan, Pakistan

The pakol traces its origins to the extreme north of Pakistan, specifically Gilgit, Astore and the neighbouring areas, from where it spread to Chitral by the 19th century. The woolen cap has been the staple headgear of Shina and Kho people for centuries. It was adopted among the Pashtuns of Pakistan as a replacement for the large turban, especially in the main cities like Peshawar, thanks to the Chitrali traders and businessmen who were also responsible for spreading the popularity of the distinctive Chitrali cap or pakol in the country. Initially expanding their businesses, the Chitrali pakol traders eventually came to dominate the Qissa Khwani Bazaar of Peshawar. Only in the tribal areas along the Afghan border has the traditional Pashtun turban remained popular.

In recent decades it has been adopted by several communities of Afghanistan such as Pashtuns, Tajiks, the Pashayi, and Nuristanis. In the late 20th century, the pakol was introduced in the Kashmir Valley by seasonal ethnic Shina migrants hailing from the Gurez and Tuleil areas in north Kashmir's Bandipora district. Today the pakol is commonly worn by people of all social classes and backgrounds from Pakistan and Afghanistan, as well as in parts of India, such as in Jammu and Kashmir and Delhi.

=== Kausia and refutation of Macedonian link ===
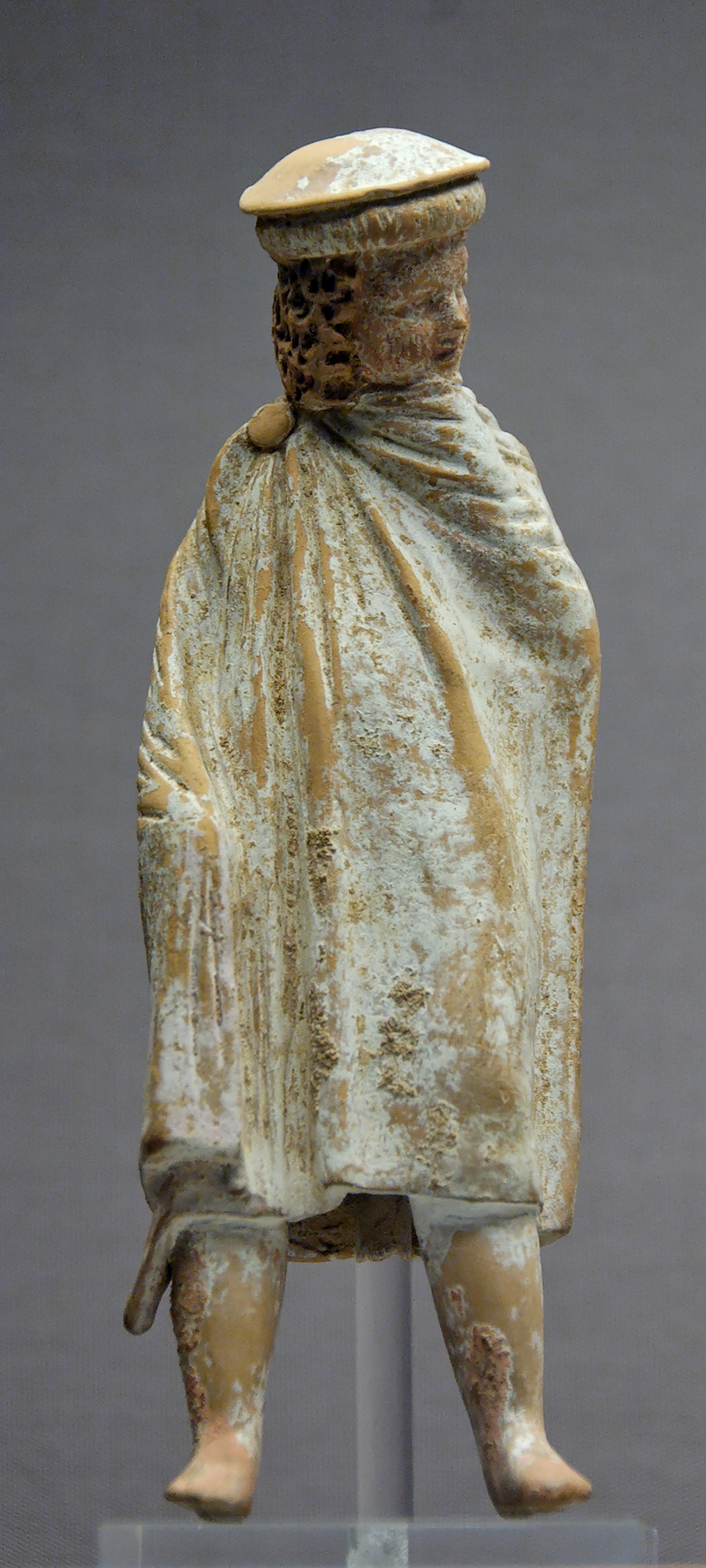
A statue of a Macedonian boy wearing Kausia. Terracotta, made in Athens, ca. 300 BC

Some authors, comparing the traditional headgear to the Greek Kausia worn by the ancient Macedonians, have tried to link the pakol to the Indian campaigns of Alexander the Great in the late fourth century BC, either as an example of east to west or west to east transmission. The pakol was also connected to the Greco-Bactrian and Indo-Greek kingdoms of the ensuing centuries. However, according to other scholars the pakol has no links with the Kausia.

According to Willem Vogelsang, pakol independently appeared in the extreme north of modern Pakistan, in the present-day Gilgit and Astore, and belongs to a wider horizon of similarly shaped headgear worn in the Eurasian borderlands. It appears that at some time in past the people of Gilgit, Chitral and adjoining regions started to include an extra round piece of material to form a flat crown. This modern twist is not a feature that Alexander's soldiers could have picked up in the late fourth century BC. The simple cap with rolled-rim was worn in Gilgit, from where it spread further west, towards the Chitral area where it was widely worn by the late 1920s. The pakol has a very recent history in Nuristan, going back no older than the late nineteenth century, where it was introduced from Chitral, although it is widely worn there nowadays.

=== Origin and documentation in Gilgit and Chitral ===
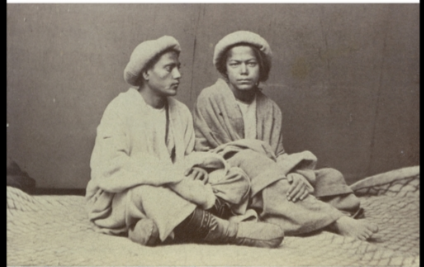
Gilgiti children wearing khoi, 1860

John Biddulph, in Tribes of the Hindoo Koosh (1880), referred to the "rolled woolen cap" and ascribed it to the Shina people of the Gilgit, Astor and the neighbouring areas, as earlier mentioned by Frederick Drew for the Shina people whom he visited in 1862. Biddulph also tells that in the regions west of Gilgit such as Chitral, Wakhan and Sirikol the people used to wear small scanty turbans:

In Chitral, Wakhan and Sirikol the men wear very small scanty turbans. In Gilgit, Astor, and the greater part of Yaghestan the rolled woolen cap mentioned by Mr. Drew is commonly worn. In the Shin caste unmarried women are distinguished by a white cap, which is never worn by married Shin women.

Later, in 1895, A.H. Mason described the dress of the Shina people, including "round caps with rolled up edges" or "bag-like caps made of wool." George Scott Robertson described it as a "Shin cap" and "Chitrali cap" in The Kafirs of the Hindu Kush while traveling in Nuristan.

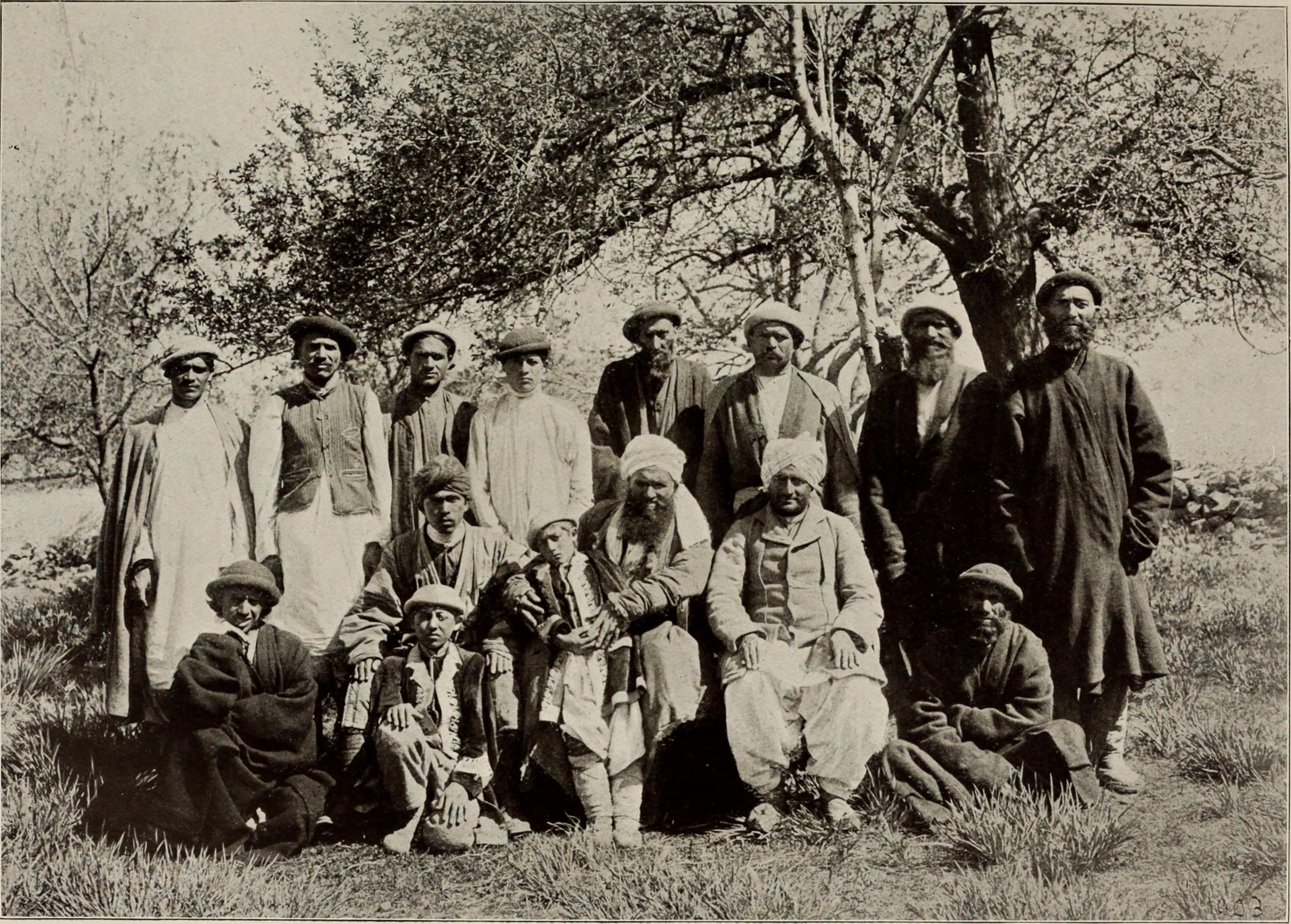
Chitrali villagers pictured wearing pakols in 1912

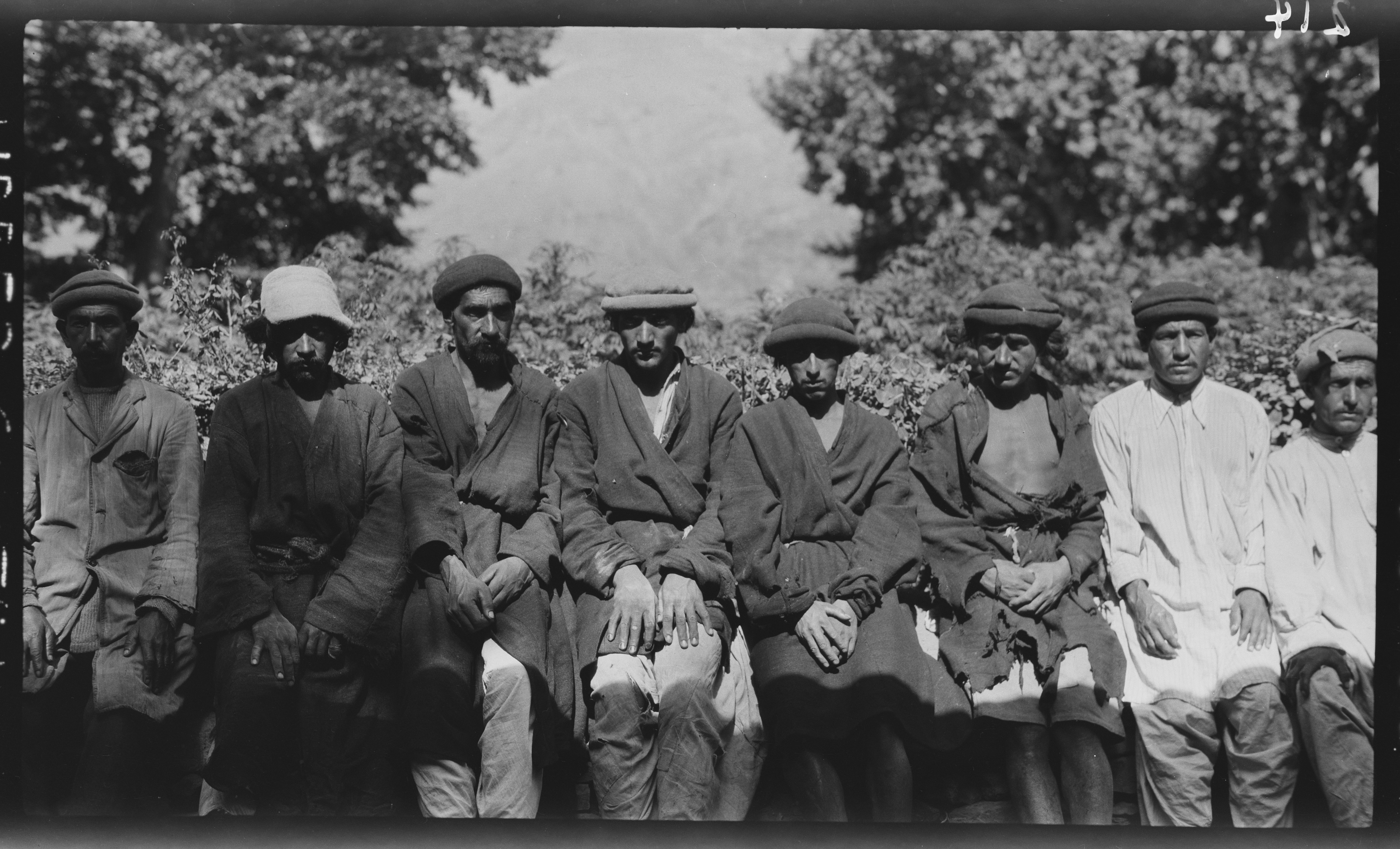
Chitralis pictured wearing pakols in 1929

The hat is also known as kapalo khoi and khapol in Shina and Khowar, respectively. The pakol is mentioned in Donatus O'Brien's 1895 book on The Language of Chitral, which, in describing the ethnic dress of the Kho people, states:

The dress worn by most men consist of a homespun cap black, brown or grey made in the shape of a bag and rolled up until it fits the skull.

The earliest unequivocal reference to the pakol thus refers to the extreme north in Gilgit, while at the same time in areas slightly further to the west and south, including Chitral, the people wore turbans. This would indicate that in lands even further to the west, the pakol was also still unknown.

The popularity of the pakol had moved west by the late 1920s, when Georg Morgenstierne visited the Chitral district and photographed the locals wearing a pakol, although the photographs seem to show that the pakol lacks the distinctive flat crown of the modern cap and more resembles the type of pakol still worn in Gilgit, which may thus well represent the "original" form of the pakol.

Since the late 1980s it has been also adopted by several communities of Afghanistan such as Tajiks, Pashayi٫ Pashtuns and Nuristanis. It was adopted first among the Pashtuns of Pakistan as a replacement for the large turban, especially in the main cities, as for instance in Peshawar. The Shina people of Dras, Ladakh in India have also worn the pakol since ancient times, and they refer to it as Shin khoyi, which means the headwear of the Shina people. Recently, it was also introduced in the Kashmir valley by seasonal migrants of ethnic Shins hailing from the Gurez and Tuleil areas in north Kashmir's Bandipore district. Today, the pakol commonly worn by people of all social classes and backgrounds from Pakistan and Afghanistan, as well as in parts of India, such as in Jammu and Kashmir and Delhi.

=== Initial prominence in Afghanistan ===
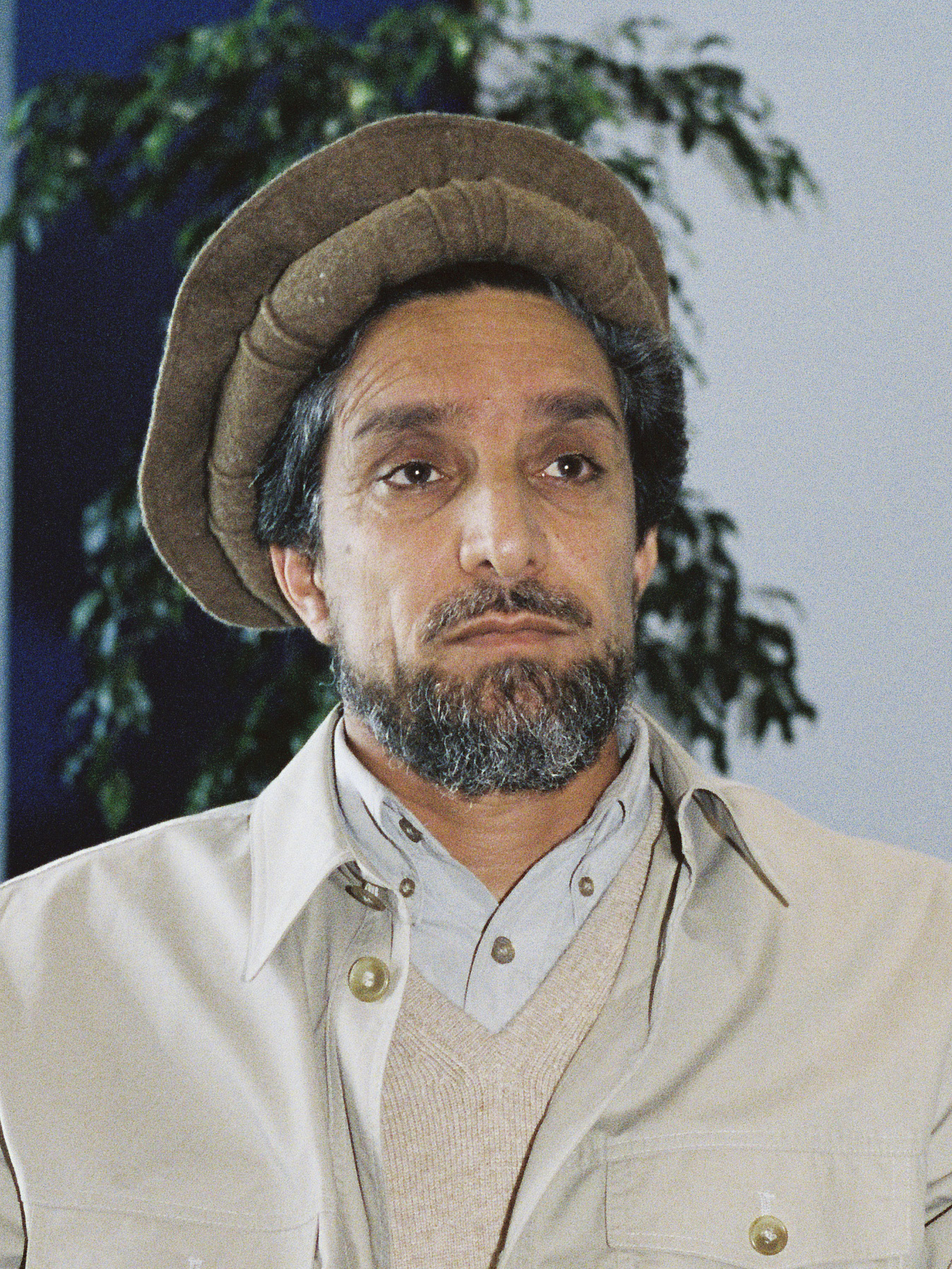
The Tajik military leader of Afghanistan, Ahmad Shah Massoud wearing his iconic pakol

The pakol was introduced to Nuristan from neighbouring Chitral sometime in the late 19th century. According to the first proto-ethnographic documentations, the inhabitants of Kafiristan, the Nuristanis, went about without any headgear. They also used to shave their head, leaving a small patch on the crown where the hair is left to grow, hanging down often as far as the waist.

In the earliest source of the pakol in Nuristan by George Scott Robertson, he refers to the pakol as the Shin cap and Chitrali cap and states that it was only worn in the Bashgal Valley, the easternmost valley of Kafiristan bordering Chitral, and the hat was acquired from Chitral in the further east through trade. This point is confirmed by the headgear worn by the men depicted in the huge woodcarvings, known as gandauws, for which the Kafirs were famous, which all date from before the Afghan occupation of Kafiristan in the late 1890s, where the men are shown wearing turbans. Additionally, the elderly and the young initiated among the Kalash, now living just across the border in Pakistan, also traditionally wore a turban, while all the others wore the pakol.

The pakol must have spread at a quick pace among the locals, now renamed Nuristanis, after and partially as a consequence of the conquest of Kafiristan by Abdul Rahman Khan of Afghanistan. The opening up of the valleys to increased contact and trade, and the population's conversion to Islam, induced the residents to abandon their previously distinctive hairstyle and cover their heads with hats. The adoption of specific items of clothing to mark a new identity, especially a religious one, is well established in history.

In the 1980s, the pakol gained popularity in large parts of Afghanistan as the favourite easy to wear headgear of the mujahideen, who fought against the Democratic Republic of Afghanistan and their Soviet supporters. One of the most famous people wearing the pakol was the military leader of the Panjshir Valley, Ahmad Shah Massoud. In those years, people from all over Afghanistan, but especially from among the Tajik population of northern Afghanistan, who lived in an area bordering Nuristan, donned the pakol in order to show their opposition to the government.

In 1992, the Mujahideen took control of the capital Kabul, and since the Tajiks from the northeast of the country played a dominant role in the formation of the new government of Islamic State of Afghanistan, their pakol became the dominant headgear of the Afghan capital. However, the civil war between the various Mujahideen parties continued with the new appearance of the Taliban, who were mainly Pashtuns from the south of the country and opposed to the pakol wearing Mujahideen from the northeast. The Taliban used to wear turbans, the traditional Pashtun headgear, preferably the dark variety of Kandahar, while their opponents continued to wear the pakol. When the Taliban took control of Kabul in September 1996, the pakol disappeared from the streets, only to return when in November 2001, the Northern Alliance with the help of the American army managed to dispel the Taliban. At that time the pakol again gained popularity, while the Pashtuns from the south and southeast of the country, who used to form the core of the Taliban movement, still preferred to wear a turban.

Since the Taliban recaptured Afghanistan in 2021, they have often detained individuals wearing the pakol, after accusing them of being resistance fighters. In the wake of the ongoing republican insurgency in Afghanistan, members of the National Resistance Front (NRF), including leader Ahmad Massoud, have favoured the pakol as a symbol of opposition to the Taliban.

=== Initial prominence in India ===
The pakol has traditionally been worn in India by the Shina people of northern Jammu and Kashmir's Gurez Valley and Tulail Valley, as well as in Ladakh's Dras Valley. The pakol has also been worn in the Kashmir Valley, where they were introduced by seasonal migrants of ethnic Shins/Dards, hailing from Gurez. A columnist with a valley based newspaper, is of the opinion that the cap became popular in the 1950s after being sported by Bakshi Ghulam Mohammad, the Chief Minister of Jammu and Kashmir. The pakol has become popular in other parts of India, such as in Delhi, where it is sold by Afghans living in India. It also gained popularity in Muslim majority areas in northern India, especially areas around shrines where the twisted variety is especially popular.

== Different types of pakol ==
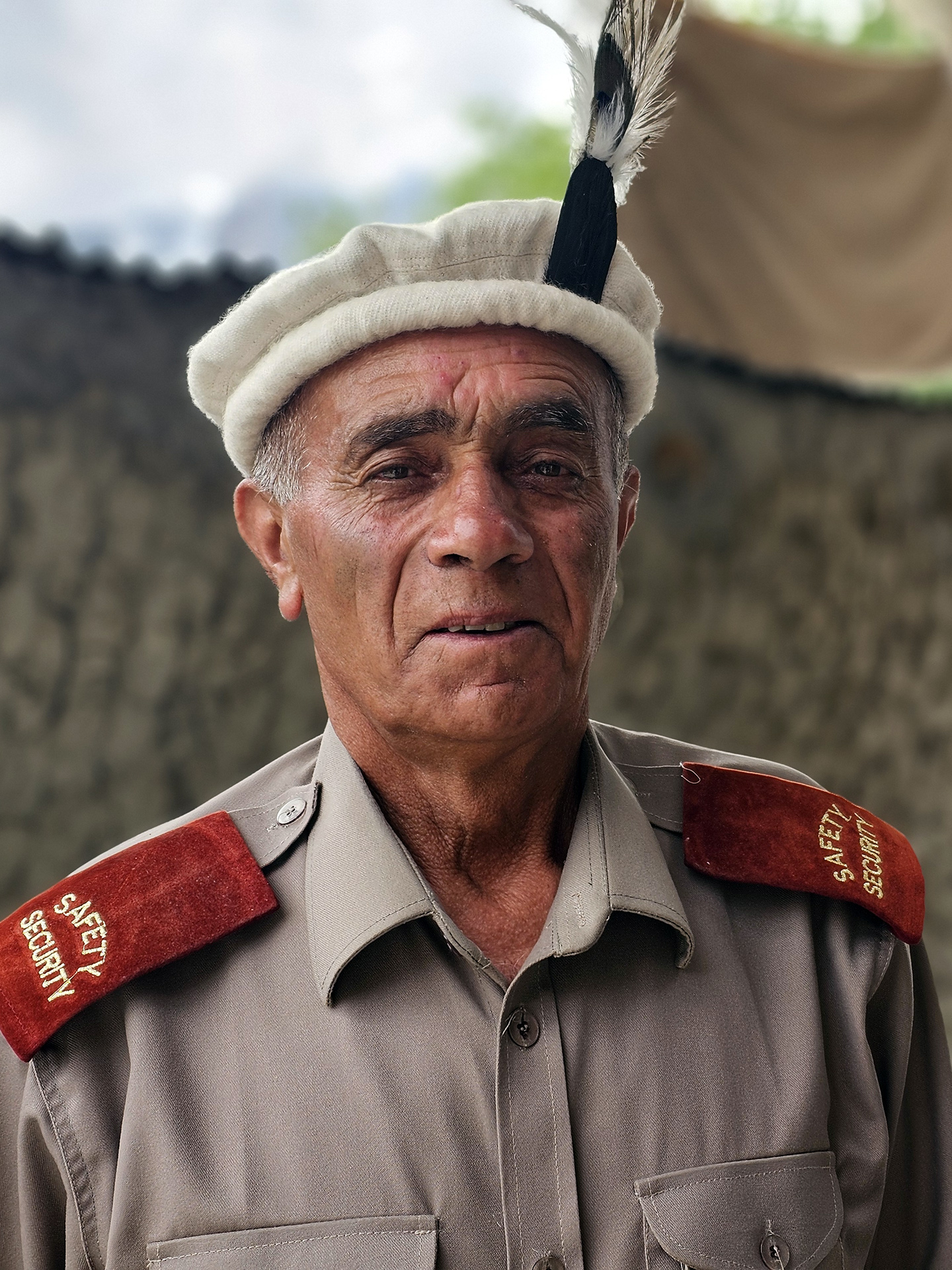
A guard at Baltit Fort wearing a pakol, Karimabad, Hunza, Gilgit-Baltistan

Within Pakistan and Afghanistan, there are different types of pakol worn by various ethnic groups and regions. These differences lie in shapes and styles, and are sometimes unique to a certain region or ethnic group.

=== Traditional pakol ===
The traditional pakol hat is a soft, woollen hat that is flat, and rims are rolled into the headwear to be worn. It is made out of wool and comes in a variety of colours, usually natural earth colours being the most popularly worn. It is mainly worn in the Pakistani regions of Chitral, Gilgit-Baltistan, and northern regions of Afghanistan.

=== Chitrali pakol ===
The Chitrali pakol is worn by the Chitral Scouts of Northern Pakistan. It is white, has a markhor insignia, and dons a peacock feather. It is considered a sign of dignity and honour amongst the Chitrali community and they usually present it to famous guests. This style of pakol is unique to the region. Diana, Princess of Wales, Catherine, Duchess of Cambridge and Prince William, Duke of Cambridge wore it during their visits to Pakistan.

=== Twisted pakol ===
The twisted pakol is another variant of the pakol; it has two layers and the rims are twisted. It is made with pure wool and comes in different colours and sizes. Twisted pakols are common in the Pakistani province of Khyber Pakhtunkhwa, Afghanistan and the Indian union territory of Jammu and Kashmir. They are lighter in weight and can be adjusted more easily than traditional ones.

== See also ==
- Iraghi cap
- Sindhi cap
- Himachali cap
- Beret
- List of hat styles
