= George Shaw Lefevre, 1st Baron Eversley =

British politician (1831–1928)

The Right Honourable The Lord Eversley PC DL
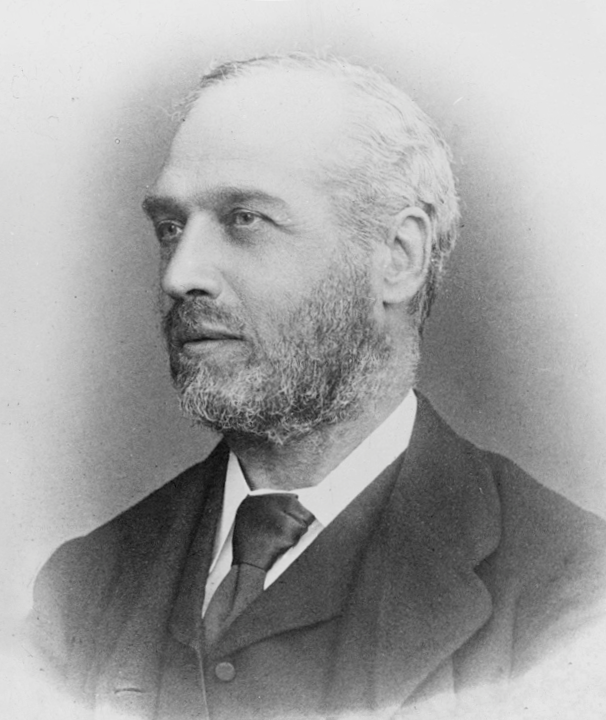

First Commissioner of Works
- In office 29 November 1881 – 13 February 1885
- Monarch: Victoria
- Prime Minister: William Ewart Gladstone
- Preceded by: William Patrick Adam
- Succeeded by: The Earl of Rosebery
- In office 18 August 1892 – 10 March 1894
- Monarch: Victoria
- Prime Minister: William Ewart Gladstone
- Preceded by: Hon. David Plunket
- Succeeded by: Herbert Gladstone

Postmaster General
- In office 7 November 1884 – 9 June 1885
- Monarch: Victoria
- Prime Minister: William Ewart Gladstone
- Preceded by: Henry Fawcett
- Succeeded by: Lord John Manners

President of the Local Government Board
- In office 1894 – 21 June 1895
- Monarch: Victoria
- Prime Minister: The Earl of Rosebery
- Preceded by: Henry Fowler
- Succeeded by: Henry Chaplin

Personal details
- Born: 12 June 1831 Battersea
- Died: 19 April 1928 (aged 96) Kings Worthy, Hampshire
- Party: Liberal Party
- Spouse: Lady Constance Reynolds-Moreton (d. 1929)
- Education: Trinity College, Cambridge

George John Shaw Lefevre, 1st Baron Eversley, PC, DL (12 June 1831 – 19 April 1928) was a British Liberal Party politician. In a ministerial career that spanned thirty years, he was twice First Commissioner of Works and also served as Postmaster General and President of the Local Government Board.

== Background and education ==
George Shaw Lefevre was the only son of Sir John Shaw Lefevre and Rachel Emily, daughter of Ichabod Wright. He was born in Battersea, and was the nephew of Charles Shaw-Lefevre, 1st Viscount Eversley, Speaker of the House of Commons. He was educated at Eton and at Trinity College, Cambridge, and was called to the Bar, Inner Temple, in 1855.

== Political career ==
Shaw Lefevre stood unsuccessfully as the Liberal candidate for Winchester in 1859 but was successfully returned for Reading in 1863, a seat he held until 1885. his maiden speech in the House of Commons was made on the Alabama incident, and in 1868 he was instrumental in calling for arbitration of the Alabama Claims. He held cabinet rank under Whig Lord Russell as Civil Lord of the Admiralty in 1866, a post he held until the government fell the same year, and later served under William Ewart Gladstone as Parliamentary Secretary to the Board of Trade from 1868 to 1871, as Under-Secretary of State for the Home Department from January to March 1871, as Parliamentary Secretary of the Admiralty from 1871 to 1874 and again in 1880, after Christmas was sworn of the Privy Council. A successful barrister-at-law, he was appointed a Bencher of the Inner Temple in 1882.

In parliament, the Liberal government made Shaw Lefevre First Commissioner of Works from 1881 to 1885, before he finally entered Gladstone's cabinet in November 1884 on his appointment to Postmaster General. He relinquished the post of First Commissioner of Works in February 1885 but continued as Postmaster General until the Liberals lost power in June 1885 to Salisbury's 'Caretaker' ministry. A general election was called for 27 November 1885, and Shaw Lefevre lost his seat in parliament at the 1885 general election, meaning that he did not serve in Gladstone's brief 1886 administration. He was able to return to the House of Commons in April 1886 when he was elected for Bradford Central in a by-election, which constituency he represented until 1895. He once again became First Commissioner of Works and a member of Gladstone's cabinet in 1892. When Lord Rosebery became Prime Minister in 1894 he was appointed President of the Local Government Board, which he remained until the following year, when the Liberals were again defeated by Lord Salisbury's Conservatives. In 1897 he was elected a member of the London County Council as a Progressive for the Haggerston Division. In 1906 he was raised to the peerage as Baron Eversley, of Old Ford in the County of London, a revival of the Eversley title held by his uncle. He made his last speech in the House of Lords in 1913.

== Other public positions ==
George was also a Commissioner to negotiate a Convention on Fisheries with French Government in 1858, a member of Sea Fisheries Commission in 1862, President of the Statistical Society of London between 1878 and 1879 and Chairman of the Royal Commissions on the Loss of Life at Sea in 1885 and on the Agricultural Depression between 1893 and 1896. In 1865 he co-founded the Commons Preservation Society, becoming its first chairman and, in 1905, its president.

He was elected a Fellow of the Royal Society in 1899.

== Family ==
George married Lady Constance Moreton, daughter of Henry Reynolds-Moreton, 3rd Earl of Ducie, in 1874. They had no children. He died in April 1928, aged 96, when the barony became extinct. He is buried in the graveyard at St Mary's Church, King's Worthy. Lady Eversley survived him by a year and died in February 1929.

A sister, Madeleine, was the first Principal of Somerville Hall; and another Rachel married Arthur Hamilton-Gordon, son of the Prime Minister the 4th Earl of Aberdeen.

== Select works ==
- Shaw Lefevre, G. (1874). The Game Laws. London: William Ridgway.
- Shaw Lefevre, G. (1881). English and Irish Land Questions: Collected Essays. London: Cassell, Petter, Galpin & co.
- Shaw Lefevre, G. (1887). Peel and O'Connell; a Review of the Irish Policy of Parliament from the Act of Union to the Death of Sir Robert Peel. London: Kegan Paul, Trench & co.
- Shaw Lefevre, G. (1889). Incidents of Coercion: A Journal of Visits to Ireland in 1882 and 1888. London: K. Paul, Trench & Co.
- Shaw Lefevre, G. (1890). Combination and Coercion in Ireland: A Sequel to Incidents of Coercion. London: K. Paul, Trench, Trübner & Co.
- Shaw Lefevre, G. (1893). Agrarian Tenures : a Survey of the Laws and Customs Relating to the Holding of Land in England, Ireland, and Scotland, and of the Reforms Therein During Recent Years. London: Cassell & company.
- Shaw Lefevre, G. (1894). English Commons and Forests: the Story of the Battle During the Last Thirty Years for Public Rights over the Commons and Forests of England and Wales. London: Cassell.
- Lord Eversley (1910). Commons, Forests and Footpaths: the Story of the Battle during the Last Forty-Five Years for Public Rights over the Commons, Forests and Footpaths of England and Wales. London: Cassell.
- Lord Eversley (1912). Gladstone and Ireland: the Irish Policy of Parliament from 1850–1894. London: Methuen.
- Lord Eversley (1915). The Partitions of Poland. London: T. Fisher Unwin.
- Lord Eversley (1917). The Turkish Empire: its Growth and Decay. London: T. Fisher Unwin.

== Arms ==
Coat of arms of George Shaw Lefevre, 1st Baron Eversley
| Crest Six arrows interlaced saltirewise three and three Proper within an annulet Or. Escutcheon Sable a chevron Argent between two trefoils slipped in chief and a bezant in base surmounted by a cross pattée Or. Supporters On either side a man habited as a forester winding a horn Proper. Motto Sans Changer |

Parliament of the United Kingdom
| Preceded by Gillery Piggott; Sir Francis Goldsmid, Bt | Member of Parliament for Reading; 1863 – 1885; With: Sir Francis Goldsmid, Bt to 1878; George Palmer from 1878 | Succeeded by Charles Townshend Murdoch |
| Preceded by William Edward Forster | Member of Parliament for Bradford Central; 1886 – 1895 | Succeeded by James Leslie Wanklyn |
Political offices
| Preceded by Lord John Hay | Civil Lord of the Admiralty; 1866 | Succeeded by Charles Du Cane |
| New office | Parliamentary Secretary to the Board of Trade; 1868–1871 | Succeeded by Arthur Peel |
| Preceded by Edward Knatchbull-Hugessen | Under-Secretary of State for the Home Department; 1871 | Succeeded by Henry Winterbotham |
| Preceded by William Edward Baxter (First Secretary to the Admiralty) | Parliamentary Secretary to the Admiralty; 1871–1874 | Succeeded by Hon. Algernon Egerton |
| Preceded by Hon. Algernon Egerton | Parliamentary Secretary of the Admiralty; 1880 | Succeeded by George Trevelyan |
| Preceded by William Patrick Adam | First Commissioner of Works; 1881–1885 | Succeeded by The Earl of Rosebery |
| Preceded by Henry Fawcett | Postmaster General; 1884–1885 | Succeeded by Lord John Manners |
| Preceded by Hon. David Plunket | First Commissioner of Works; 1892–1894 | Succeeded by Herbert Gladstone |
| Preceded by Henry Fowler | President of the Local Government Board; 1894–1895 | Succeeded by Henry Chaplin |
Peerage of the United Kingdom
| New creation | Baron Eversley; 1906–1928 | Extinct |
