= George Scott Robertson =

British soldier, author, and administrator

G.S. Robertson

Sir George Scott Robertson, KCSI (22 October 1852 – 1 January 1916) was a British surgeon, soldier, politician, and author. He was a Member of Parliament for ten years. He is best known for his arduous journey to the remote and rugged region of Kafiristan in what is now northeastern Afghanistan and for his overall command of British Empire forces during the Siege of Chitral. He chronicled his Kafiristan experience in the book The Kafirs of the Hindu Kush.

== Travels to Kafiristan ==
Robertson was born in London and received his education at the Westminster Hospital Medical School (now Chelsea and Westminster Hospital, London). In 1878, he entered the Indian Medical Service and served throughout the Second Anglo-Afghan War of 1878–80. In 1888 he was attached to the Indian Foreign Office and assigned as agency surgeon in Gilgit, in northern India, now Pakistan.

According to his book, it was around this time, during the war and while in Gilgit, that Robertson became interested in the land and way of life of the Kafir people. He asked the Government of India for permission to journey to Kafiristan, and by October 1889 was on his way, departing from Chitral in what is now northwest Pakistan in the company of several Kafir headmen of the Kam tribe. His journey lasted just over a year, ending in 1891, and providing Robertson with first-hand experience of what to him were the strange customs and colourful people of Kafiristan.

He was made a Companion of the Order of the Star of India in 1892.

== Siege of Chitral ==
In 1893, Surgeon Major Robertson was reassigned to the then-independent State of Chitral, this time as a political agent. In 1895, he brought a force of around 400 soldiers, under the direct command of Captain Charles Vere Ferrers Townshend, from Gilgit to oversee the transfer of power in Chitral following the death of its ruler, Aman ul-Mulk. After his arrival, Robertson engaged in a series of complex political and military manoeuvres, during which hostility from local tribesmen led his forces to move into Chitral Fort for protection. The six-week siege that followed included an unsuccessful sortie on 3 March 1895, when the British-led forces took heavy losses. The siege was raised on 19 April when a relief force under Colonel Kelly arrived and dispersed the armed tribesmen.

For his service during the famous siege, Robertson was made a Knight Commander of the Order of the Star of India and appointed British agent in Gilgit. He made the important decision of installing and recognising Shuja ul-Mulk as the provisional Mehtar of Chitral, subject to approval of the Government. He later wrote a book by the title Chitral; the Story of a Minor Siege recounting the intense and dramatic events in Chitral.

== Later years ==
Robertson continued in the Indian Service until his retirement in 1899. He then returned to Great Britain where he made an unsuccessful bid for political office as a Liberal party candidate in Stirlingshire at the 1900 general election, but later was elected in Central Bradford in 1906. He held his seat in the House of Commons until his death on New Year's Day, 1916.

He was elected a Fellow of the Royal Botanic Society of London in November 1902.

== The Kafirs of the Hindu-Kush ==
In 1896, Lawrence & Bullen Ltd published The Kafirs of the Hindu Kush written by Sir George Scott Robertson. The book provided a detailed account of Sir George Robertson's tour throughout Kafiristan. Although its descriptions of the Kafirs of the Hindu Kush are written in an outdated and colonial (and, from the perspective of modern sensibilities, discriminatory) style, the work contains some of the only accounts of the region from that time period. The book is accompanied by illustrations by Arthur David McCormick and was dedicated by the author to his wife.

Some have suggested that Robertson's year-long expedition and subsequent book (originally published in 1896) provided background and inspiration for Rudyard Kipling's short story "The Man Who Would Be King". However, Kipling's work was originally published in 1888, predating Robertson's travels to the region.

== Sources ==
- Robertson, George Scott (1896) The Kafirs of the Hindu-Kush. Lawrence & Bullen, LTD., London.
- Mohammad Afzal Khan Chitral and Kafirstan, a personal study. Peshawar, Pakistan. ISBN 4871875210
- 1911 Encyclopædia Britannica (11th Edition): Sir George Scott Robertson

Parliament of the United Kingdom
Preceded by James Leslie Wanklyn	Member of Parliament for Bradford Central; 1906 – 1916	Succeeded by James Hill
