= Anthony Gadie =

English businessman and politician (1868 - 1948)

Member of Parliament for Bradford Central
- In office 1924–1929

Personal details
- Born: 7 September 1868 Skipton, England
- Died: 24 August 1948 (aged 79)
- Party: Conservative
- Military career
- Allegiance: United Kingdom
- Branch: Territorial Force
- Rank: Major
- Unit: 2nd West Riding Brigade
- Conflicts: World War I

Lieutenant-Colonel Sir Anthony Gadie T.D. (7 September 1868 – 24 August 1948) was an English businessman and Conservative Party politician from Bradford in West Yorkshire.

Born in a small cottage in Skipton, he became a builder and then an estate agent, a Lord Mayor of Bradford and a local councillor and alderman for 45 years. He served as an army officer in France during World War I and as a Member of Parliament (MP) in the 1920s, but is best known for his involvement with construction of the Scar House Reservoir.

== Career ==
Gadie began his career as a builder, and made his name developing "Gadie's garden suburb" at Allerton. He later founded an estate agency business, Anthony Gadie & Sons.

He served in the army during the First World War, in the 2nd West Riding Brigade of the Territorial Force, where he was promoted to the rank of major on 29 August 1914.

== Politics ==
Gadie was a member of Bradford City Council from 1900 to 1945. and was the Lord Mayor of Bradford from 1920 to 1921. He also served as chair of the corporation's Water Committee, playing a big part in establishing the Scar House Reservoir, which was finally completed in 1936. Scar House was the second of two reservoirs built at great cost by Bradford Council in Upper Nidderdale to supply the city's needs.

As Lord Mayor, Gadie cut the sod for the reservoir on 5 October 1931 and, 15 years later, he placed the last stone in position at the topping-out ceremony on 7 September 1936.

The reservoir was dismissed by some as a waste of money, and known as "Gadie's Folly". However, during the droughts of 1933 and 1934, Bradford had all the water it needed.

Gadie was Chairman of the Bradford Conservative and Unionist Association from 1924 to 1947, and at the 1924 general election he was elected to the House of Commons as the Member of Parliament (MP) for Bradford Central, winning the seat from the sitting Labour Party MP William Leach on a swing of 3.4%.

However, Leach re-gained the seat at the 1929 general election, and after his defeat Gadie did not stand for Parliament again.

It was announced in King's Birthday Honours in 1935 that he was to be knighted "for political and public services in Bradford". The title was conferred in a ceremony at Buckingham Palace on 10 July 1935.

== Later life ==
Gadie was a charter member and President of the Rotary Club in Bradford in 1924–25, and a freemason who rose to become Provincial Grand Master for the Masonic Province of the West Riding of Yorkshire. He was awarded the freedom of the city of Bradford in October 1944.

He died on 24 August 1948, aged 79, and is buried in the Undercliffe Cemetery, Bradford. His address at time of death was listed as "Oakwood", Toller Lane, Bradford.

Parliament of the United Kingdom
Preceded by William Leach	Member of Parliament for Bradford Central; 1924 – 1929	Succeeded by William Leach
