= Harry Frederick Whitchurch =

Recipient of the Victoria Cross

Harry Frederick Whitchurch VC
- Born: 2 September 1866; Kensington, London
- Died: 16 August 1907 (aged 40); Dharmsala, Punjab, India
- Burial place: Dharmsala Churchyard
- Military career
- Allegiance: United Kingdom
- Branch: Indian Army
- Rank: Surgeon Major
- Units: Indian Medical Service
- Conflicts: Lushai Expedition; Malakand Frontier War; Chitral Expedition; Boxer Rebellion
- Awards: Victoria Cross

Harry Frederick Whitchurch VC (22 September 1866 – 16 August 1907) was an English recipient of the Victoria Cross, the highest and most prestigious award for gallantry in the face of the enemy that can be awarded to British and Commonwealth forces.

Whitchurch was 28 years old, and a surgeon captain in the Indian Medical Service, Indian Army during the Chitral Expedition of 1895 of 1895 when, on 3 March, the following deed took place for which he was awarded the VC.

During the sortie from Chitral Fort of the 3rd March last, at the commencement of the siege, Surgeon-Captain Whitchurch went to the assistance of Captain Baird, 24th Bengal Infantry, who was mortally wounded, and brought him back to the fort under a heavy fire from the enemy. Captain Baird was on the right of the fighting line, and had only a small party of Gurkhas and men of the 4th Kashmir Rifles. He was wounded on the heights 'at a distance of a mile and a half from the fort. When Surgeon-Captain Whitchurch proceeded to his rescue, the enemy, in great strength, had broken through the fighting line'; darkness had set in and Captain Baird, Surgeon-Captain Whitchurch, and the sepoys were completely isolated from assistance. Captain Baird was placed in a dooly by Surgeon-Captain Whitchurch, and the party then attempted to return to the fort. The Gurkhas bravely clung to the dooly until three were killed and a fourth was severely wounded. Surgeon-Captain Whitchurch then put Captain Baird upon his back and carried him some distance with heroic courage and resolution. The little party kept diminishing in numbers, being fired at the whole way. On one or two occasions Surgeon-Captain Whitchurch was obliged to charge walls, from behind which the enemy kept up an incessant fire. At one place particularly the whole party was in imminent danger of being cut up, having been surrounded, by the enemy. Surgeon-Captain Whitchurch gallantly rushed the position, and eventually succeeded in getting Captain Baird and the sepoys into the fort. Nearly all the party were wounded, Captain Baird receiving two additional wounds before reaching the fort.

== Further information ==
He later achieved the rank of surgeon major and died from enteric fever.

== The Medal ==
His VC is on display at the Lord Ashcroft collection in the Imperial War Museum, Chelsea, London.
