= The Chitral Campaign: A Narrative of Events in Chitral, Swat and Bajour =

1895 book by Harry Craufuird Thomson

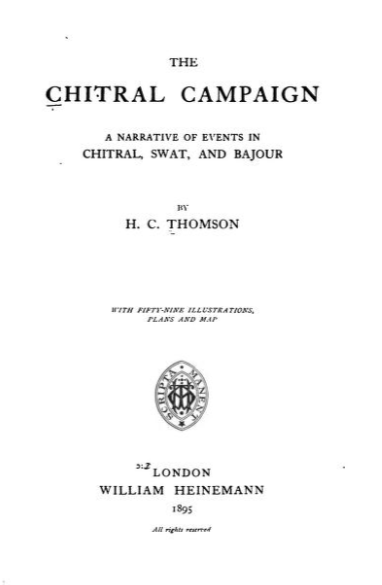
- Title page for The Chitral Campaign: A Narrative of Events in Chitral, Swat and Bajour (1895)
- Author: Harry Craufuird Thomson
- Language: English
- Subject: Chitral Expedition
- Published: 1895
- Publication place: London. England
- Media type: (Hardback)
- Pages: 350

The Chitral Campaign: A Narrative of events in Chitral, Swat and Bajour is a book narrating the turbulent account of history in Chitral following the death of it Chief Aman ul-Mulk, the subsequent Siege of Chitral and the Chitral Expedition. The book was written by Harry Craufuird Thomson with its first edition published by Heinemann Publishers in London in 1895.
