= Malakand Pass =

Mountain pass in Pakistan

Coordinates: 34°35′N 71°57′E

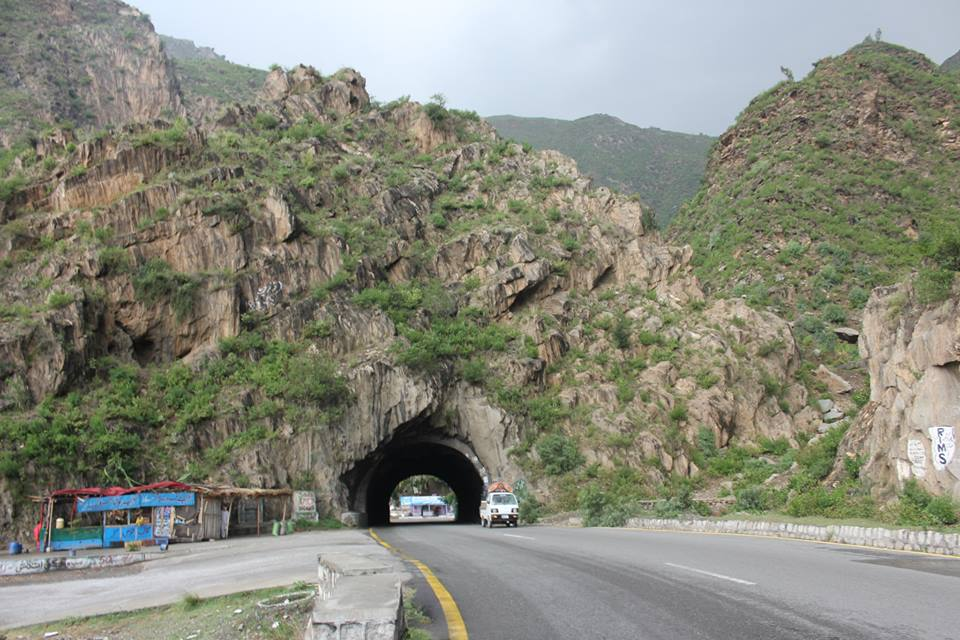
Malakand Pass Tunnel

The Malakand Pass (Pashto: درہ ملاکنډ; Urdu: درۂ ملاکنڈ) is a mountain pass in the Malakand District of Khyber Pakhtunkhwa, Pakistan, that connects Peshawar with the Chitral District.

The pass road begins at Dargai, which is 150 km north-west of Islamabad. It then slopes upward towards the tunnel, reaching the areas of Swat and Dir. From the top of the pass, Swat Canal descends through the valley. The Canal was built by the British in the colonial era to channel water from the Swat River through Malakand Pass to the plain areas around Mardan.

The Pass is a wide open road and is well-structured but sometimes it may get extensively trafficked.

At the top end, it is guarded by the Malakand Fort from which it descends through the bazaar of Batkhela, with a Hindu Shahi fort perched above it. After this, it continues to reach the headworks of the Swat Canal to the Swat River. At the bottom end, it meets the plain areas of Mardan and the Charsadda District.

== History ==
The pass came into prominence in 1895 during the Chitral Expedition, when Pashtuns offered stout resistance to Sir Robert Low's advance over the Malakand Pass to the relief of Chitral.

During the frontier risings of 1897, the Swatis and other local tribes launched a determined attack on the Malakand positions. In the initial fighting at Malakand, an estimated 700 tribesmen were killed, while at the adjacent post of Chakdara, enemy losses were estimated at 2,000. These engagements formed the opening of the Malakand Expedition later that year, famously documented by Winston Churchill, who served as a war correspondent during the campaign.

== See also ==
- List of UNESCO World Heritage Sites in Pakistan
- List of forts in Pakistan
- List of museums in Pakistan
