= James Leslie Wanklyn =

British politician

James Wanklyn

Member of the UK Parliament
- In office 1897–1906
- Preceded by: George Shaw Lefevre
- Succeeded by: George Scott Robertson
- Constituency: Bradford Central

Personal details
- Born: James Leslie Wanklyn; 14 April 1860 Holdenhurst, Hampshire
- Died: 6 July 1919 (aged 59) Lanrick Castle, Doune
- Party: Liberal Unionist
- Education: Northampton
- Occupation: Politician

James Leslie Wanklyn (14 April 1860 – 6 July 1919) was a Liberal Unionist Member of Parliament for Bradford Central, elected at the 1895 general election and again at the following general election in 1900. He did not stand at the 1906 election.

== Biography ==
Wanklyn was born in 1860 in Holdenhurst, Hampshire, to James Hibbert Wanklyn and Elizabeth Wanklyn (née Leslie).

Wanklyn had numerous sporting interests. He was a member of the Marylebone Cricket Club, for whom he played one first-class match in 1885, and an early leading member, from its inception in 1894, of the Ranelagh Club, noted as a polo and golf centre.

He died on 6 July 1919 in Northampton.

== Family ==
In August 1898, he married Laura Mary Stapylton (her first husband, Huntly Bacon, died in June 1897).

Parliament of the United Kingdom
Preceded by Rt Hon. George John Shaw-Lefevre	Member of Parliament for Bradford Central; 1895 – 1906	Succeeded by Sir George Scott Robertson
