= Henry Butler Ratcliffe =

British politician

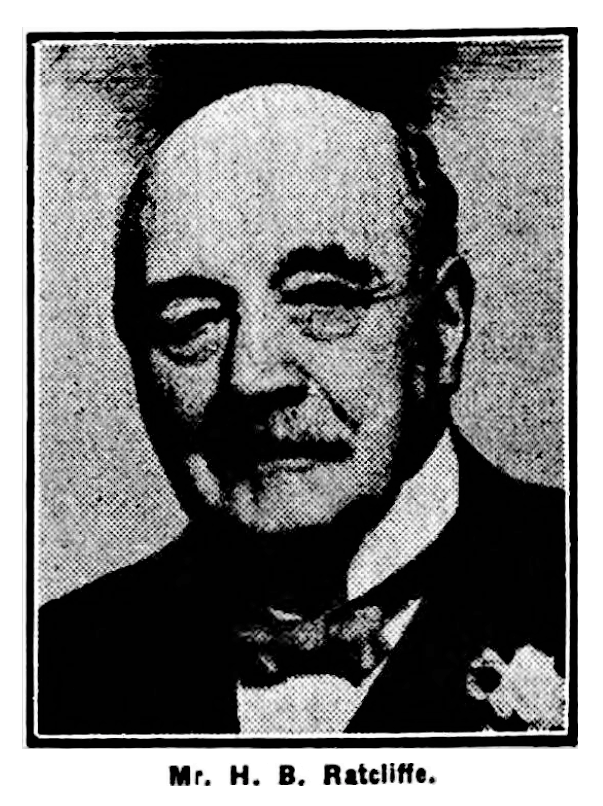

Henry Butler Ratcliffe (1845 – 9 April 1929) was a British Conservative Party politician.

He was elected as Conservative and Unionist Member of Parliament (MP) for Bradford Central at the 1918 general election. He retired from Parliament and did not contest the 1922 general election, when Bradford Central was won by the Labour Party candidate, William Leach.

Ratcliffe was born in 1845 and attended Bradford Grammar School, before joining his father’s butcher’s business, later becoming President of the Yorkshire Federation of Butchers. He served as a Bradford City councillor in 1881–83 and from 1891, and became leader of the Conservative Party on the Council and chairman of a number of council committees. He died in Bradford on 9 April 1929 at the age of 84.

Outside politics, Radcliffe served as President of the Bradford Third Equitable Building Society, and for over sixty years was a Church of England lay reader in the diocese of Bradford.

He married in 1871 and had three sons. His wife and two sons pre-deceased him, the surviving son taking over the family butcher's business.
