= Chitral Expedition =

1895 British military expedition

Coordinates: 35°53′N 71°48′E

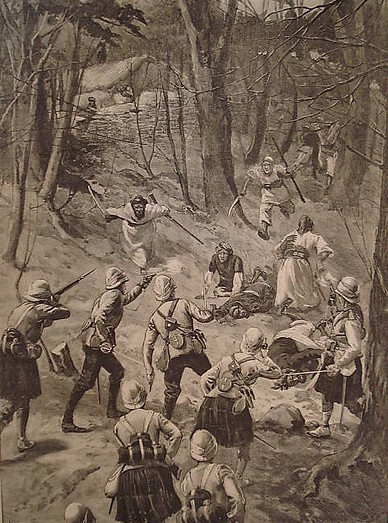
- A skirmish during the Chitral expedition
Date	1895
Location	Chitral, British India
Result	British victory

Belligerents
British Empire: (British Raj) India; Dir	Jandol; Chitral

Commanders and leaders
(United Kingdom) George White (United Kingdom) Robert Low; Shuja ul-Mulk; Nawab Mohammad Sharif Khan	Umra Khan; Sher Afzal Khan; Amir ul-Mulk

Strength
15,249 (Low Force); 1,400 (Fort & Gilgit force)	Unknown

Casualties and losses
21 killed, 101 wounded (Low force); 400 killed, 88 wounded (Fort & Kelly force)	500+ killed (at Malakand Pass only); Unknown but heavy

The Chitral Expedition (Urdu: چترال فوجی مہم) was a military expedition in 1895 sent by the British Indian Army to relieve the fort at Chitral, which was under siege after a local coup following the death of the old ruler. An intervening British force of about 400 men was besieged in the fort until it was relieved by two expeditions, a small one from Gilgit and a larger one from Peshawar.

== Background to the conflict ==
In the last phase of the Great Game, attention turned to the unclaimed mountainous area north of British India along the later Sino-Russian border. Chitral was thought to be a possible route for a Russian invasion of India, but neither side knew much about the local geography. The British sent people like George W. Hayward, Robert Shaw and probably some Pundits north to explore.

On 18 July 1870, Hayward was attacked, captured and murdered. The ruler of Chitral may have had some involvement in Hayward's murder. From 1871 there were Russian explorers in the Pamir Mountains to the north. Around 1889 some Russians entered Chitral territory as well as Hunza to the east and Gabriel Bonvalot reached Chitral from Russian territory. From around 1876 Chitral was under the suzerainty of the Maharaja of Kashmir to the southeast and therefore in the British sphere of influence but there was no British Resident. At this time Chitrali power extended east to the Yasin Valley about halfway to Hunza. The British established the Gilgit Agency about 175 miles east in 1877. In 1891 the British occupied Hunza north of Gilgit.

From 1857 to 1892 the ruler (Mehtar) was Aman ul-Mulk of the Katoor dynasty. When the old ruler died in 1892 one of his sons, Afzal ul-Mulk, seized the throne, consolidating his rule by killing as many of his half-brothers as he could. The deceased ruler's brother, Sher Afzal Khan, who had been in exile at Kabul in Afghanistan about 150 miles southwest, secretly entered Chitral with a few supporters and murdered Afzal ul-Mulk. Another of the Aman ul-Mulk's sons, Nizam ul-Mulk, who had fled to the British at Gilgit, advanced westward from Gilgit, accumulating troops as he went, including 1200 men Sher had sent against him. Seeing the situation was hopeless, Sher fled back to Afghanistan and Nizam took the throne with British blessing and the British Political Resident Lieutenant B.E.M Gurdon. Within a year Nizam ul-Mulk was murdered on the orders of his brother, Amir ul-Mulk, while the two were out hunting. Umra Khan, a tribal leader from Khanate of Jandul to the south marched with 3,000 Pathans either to assist Amir ul-Mulk or replace him. Surgeon Major George Scott Robertson, the senior British officer at Gilgit, gathered 400 troops and marched west to Chitral and threatened Umra Khan with an invasion from Peshawar if he did not turn back. Amir ul-Mulk began negotiating with Umra Khan so Robertson replaced him with his 12-year-old brother Shuja ul-Mulk. At this point Sher Afzul Khan re-entered the contest. The plan seems to have been that Sher would take the throne and Umra Khan would get part of the Chitral territory. Robertson moved into the fortress for protection which increased local hostility. Since Umra Khan and Sher Afzul continued their march secret messengers were sent out requesting help.

== Siege of Chitral ==
The Chitral Fort was 80 yards square and built of mud, stone and timber. The walls were 25 feet high and eight feet thick. There was a short covered way to the river, the only water source. The fort held 543 people of whom 343 were combatants including five British officers. The units were the 14th Sikhs and a larger detachment of Kashmiri Infantry. Artillery support was 2 RML 7 pounder Mountain Gun without sights and 80 rounds of ammunition. There were only 300 cartridges per man and enough food for a month. There were trees and buildings near the walls and nearby hills from which sniping was possible with modern rifles. Captain Charles Townshend, later of Mesopotamia fame, commanded the fort.

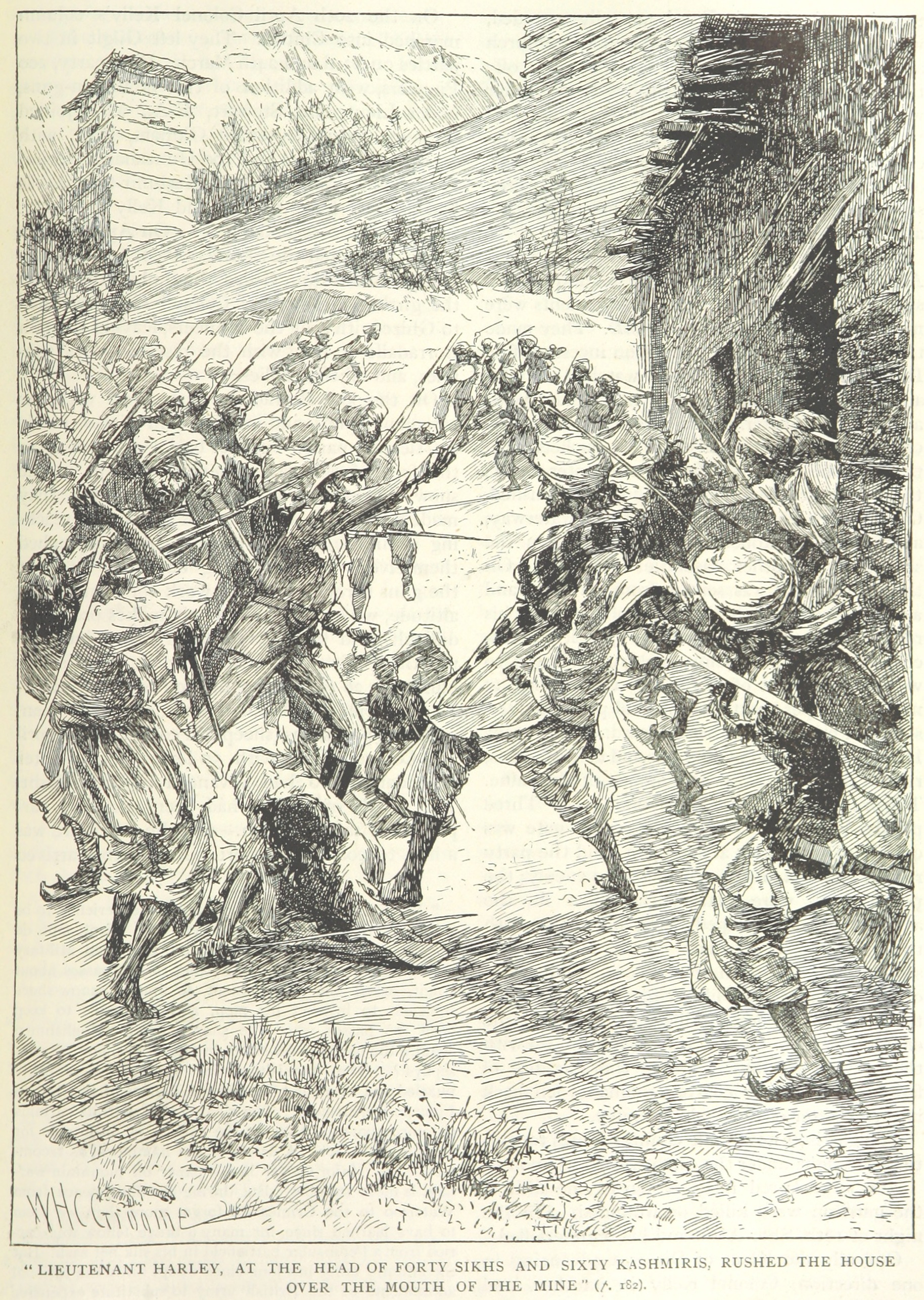
The British attack the Chitrali mine (illustration from a British book)

On 3 March a party was sent out to determine the enemy strength. Its loss was 23 killed and 33 wounded. Harry Frederick Whitchurch was awarded a Victoria Cross for aiding the wounded. At about the same time a small relief force from Gilgit was defeated and the ammunition and explosives they were carrying captured. By 5 April the Chitralis were 50 yards from the walls. On 7 April they set fire to the south-east tower which burned for 5 hours but did not collapse. Four days later the Chitralis began digging a tunnel in order to blow open the fort. The tunnel started from a house where the Chitralis held noisy parties to hide the sounds of digging. By the time sounds of digging were heard it was too late to dig a counter mine. One hundred men rushed out of the eastern gate, found the mouth of the tunnel, bayoneted the miners, blew up the tunnel with explosives and returned with a loss of eight men. On the night of 18 April someone shouted over the wall that the besiegers had fled. The next morning a heavily armed party found that this was true. Kelly's relief force entered Chitral on 20 April and found the besieged "walking skeletons". The siege had lasted a month and a half and cost the defenders 41 lives.

== Relief ==
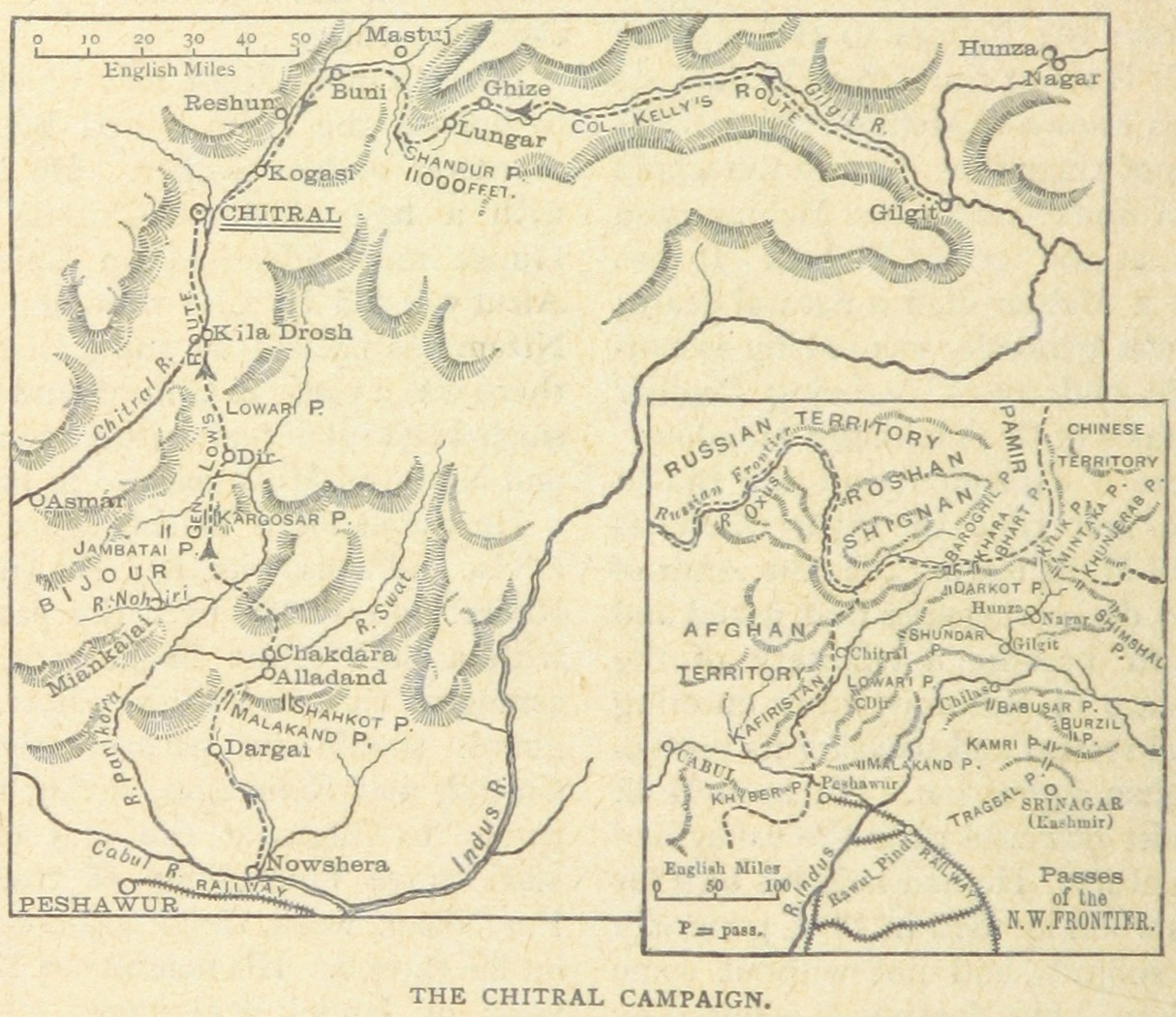
The routes of the British relief expeditions

When the British heard of Robertson's situation they began assembling troops around Peshawar, but they were not in a hurry since they assumed that Umra Khan would back down. When reports became more serious they ordered Colonel James Graves Kelly at Gilgit to act. He gathered what troops he could: 400 Sikh Pioneers - mostly road-builders, 40 Kasmiri sappers with 2 Mountain Guns, 900 Hunza Irregulars, all hearty mountain men, and a number of hired coolies to carry the baggage. Although his force was small he had the advantage that the Chitralis did not think that anyone would be fool enough to cross 150 miles of mountains in late winter. He left Gilgit on 23 March, probably up the valley of the Gilgit River, and by 30 March had crossed the snowline at 10,000 feet. Seeing what they were in for, the coolies deserted with their laden ponies but were soon rounded up and kept under guard. The main problem was the 12,000 feet high Shandur Pass at the head of the Gilgit River which was crossed in the waist-deep snow dragging mountain guns on sledges (1 to 5 April). Fighting began the next day when the Chitralis became aware of them. By 13 April they had driven the enemy from two main positions and by 18 April the enemy seemed to have disappeared.

Meanwhile, the British had assembled 15,000 men at Peshawar under Major-General Sir Robert Low, with Brigadier General Bindon Blood serving as his Chief of the Staff. They set off about a week after Kelly left Gilgit. Accompanying Low was Francis Younghusband who was officially on leave and serving as a special correspondent for the London Times.

On 3 April they stormed the Malakand Pass which was defended by 12,000 local warriors. There were significant engagements 2 and 10 days later. On 17 April Umra Khan's men prepared to defend his palace at Munda, but finding themselves greatly outnumbered, they slipped away. Inside the fortress the British found a letter from a Scottish firm offering Maxim guns at 3,700 rupees and revolvers at 34 rupees each. The firm was ordered to leave India. Low was still crossing the Lowari Pass on the day Kelly entered Chitral. Although Kelly got to Chitral first, it was the massive size of Low's force that forced the enemy to withdraw. The first person from Low's force to reach Chitral was Younghusband who, without permission, rode out ahead of the troops. That night Younghusband, Robertson, and Kelly shared the garrison's last bottle of brandy.

== Aftermath ==
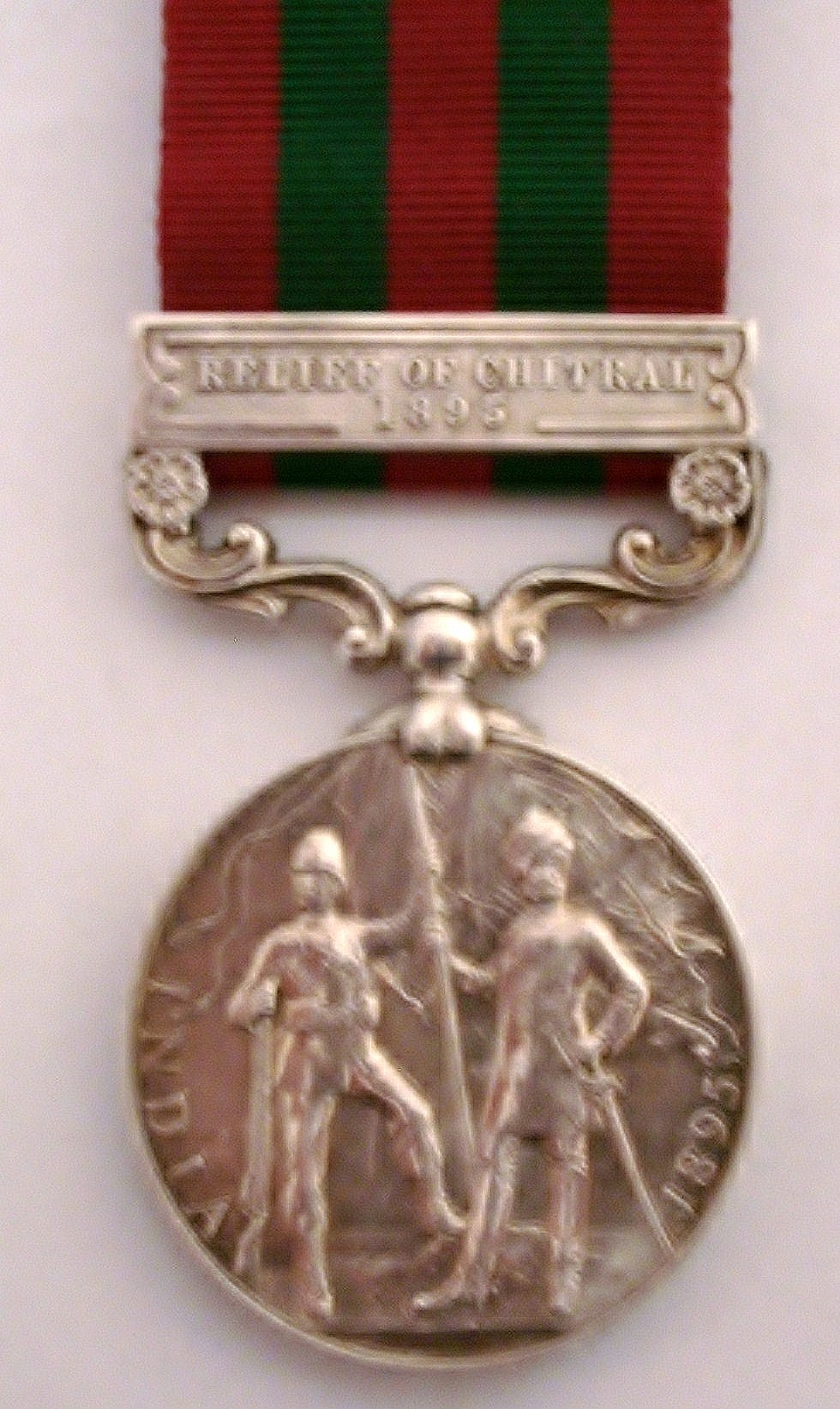
India Medal with Relief of Chitral clasp

Umra Khan fled with eleven mule-loads of treasure and reached safety in Afghanistan. Sher Afzul ran into one of his foes and was sent into exile in India. Robertson was made a Knight Commander of the Order of the Star of India. Kelly was made a Personal aide-de-camp to the Queen and made a Companion of the Order of the Bath. Eleven Distinguished Service Orders (DSOs) were awarded, along with Whitchurch's VC, and all ranks who took part in the siege were given six months extra pay and three months leave. Townshend later became a Major General and at least nine participants became Generals. There was talk of building a road from Peshawar, but this was rejected because of the expense and the fear that the Russians could use the road too. Two battalions were stationed at Chitral and two at the Malakand Pass. In the spring of 1898 Captain Ralph Cobbold was on "hunting leave" in the Pamirs and learned that the Russians had planned to occupy Chitral if the British abandoned it.

British and Indian Army forces who took part received the India Medal with either the clasp Defence of Chitral 1895 or Relief of Chitral 1895.

Chitral remained at peace after 1895 and Shuja ul-Mulk, the 12 year old installed as Mehtar by Robertson, ruled Chitral for the next 41 years until his death in 1936.

== Appraisal ==
The Chitral Expedition is a much celebrated event, remembered in British history as a chapter in gallantry and valour.

The valour and endurance displayed by all the ranks in the defence of the fort at Chitral, have added greatly to the prestige of the British arms, and will elicit the admiration of all those who read this account of the gallant defence made by a small party of Her Majesty’s forces, and combined with the troops of His Highness the Maharaja of Kashmir, against heavy odds when shut up in a fort in the heart of an enemy’s country, many miles from succour and support.

— Commander in Chief of India, Sir George White

The military skill displayed in the conducting of the defence, the cheerful endurance of all the hardship of the siege, the gallant demeanour of the troops and the conspicuous example of heroism and intrepidity recorded, will ever be remembered as forming a glorious episode in the history of the Indian Empire and its army.

— Viceroy of India, Lord Curzon

== See also ==
- Hunza–Nagar Campaign
- Category:British military personnel of the Chitral Expedition

== Sources ==
- The Great Game by Peter Hopkirk, John Murray Ltd. (1990)
- The Relief of Chitral by Major General Sir George J. Younghusband and Sir Francis E. Younghusband, Macmillan & Co (1896)
- With Kelly to Chitral by Major General Sir William G.L. Beynon, Arnold Publishers (1896)
- Campaigns on the North West Frontier by Captain H L Nevill, Naval & Military Press (1912)
- Chitral; the Story of a Minor Siege by Sir George Scott Robertson, KCSI, Methuen Publishing (1898)
- Townshend of Chitral and Kut by Erroll Sherson John (1928)
- Much Sounding of Bugles: The Siege of Chitral 1895, John Harris, Hutchinson (1975)
- The Chitral Campaign: A Narrative of Events in Chitral, Swat and Bajour by Harry Craufuird Thomson, Heinemann Publishers (1895)
- Huttenback, Robert A. "The Siege of Chitral and the “Breach of Faith Controversy”—The Imperial Factor in Late Victorian Party Politics." Journal of British Studies 10.1 (1970): 126-144.
