= Bradford Central =

Parliamentary constituency in the United Kingdom, 1885–1955

- Former borough constituency for the House of Commons
- County: West Riding of Yorkshire
- Major settlements: Bradford

1885–1955
- Seats: One
- Created from: Bradford
- Replaced by: Bradford North (Majority), Bradford East (Part) and Bradford West (Part)

Bradford Central was a parliamentary constituency in the city of Bradford, West Yorkshire, which returned one Member of Parliament (MP) to the House of Commons of the Parliament of the United Kingdom. Elections were held under the first-past-the-post voting system.

The constituency was created for the 1885 general election, when the Redistribution of Seats Act split the two-member Bradford constituency into three single-seat divisions. It was abolished for the 1955 general election.

== Political history ==
For most of its existence, Bradford Central was a marginal seat, initially between the Liberal Party and the Conservatives or their Liberal Unionist allies. The Liberals held it for all but eleven of the years from 1885 to 1918, after which it became a Labour-Conservative marginal. Control alternated between Labour and the Conservatives through the 1920s and 1930s, and in 1945 it became a safe seat for Labour.

== Boundaries ==
1885–1918: The Municipal Borough of Bradford wards of Exchange, Lister Hills, Little Horton, North, and West.

1918–1950: The County Borough of Bradford wards of East, Exchange, Manningham, North, South, and West.

1950–1955: The County Borough of Bradford wards of Bradford Moor, Exchange, Manningham, North East, and South.

== Members of Parliament ==
Election	Member	Party	Notes
1885	William Edward Forster	Liberal	Died April 1886
1886 by-election	George Shaw Lefevre	Liberal	Member for Reading (1863–1885); First Commissioner of Works (1892–1894); President of the Local Government Board (1894–1895)
1895	James Leslie Wanklyn	Liberal Unionist	
1906	George Scott Robertson	Liberal	Died January 1916
1916 by-election	James Hill	Liberal	
Constituency split, majority formed part of Bradford South, minority joined parts of Bradford East and the abolished Bradford West
1918	Henry Butler Ratcliffe	Unionist	
1922	William Leach	Labour	Under-Secretary of State for Air (1924)
1924	Anthony Gadie	Unionist	
1929	William Leach	Labour	
1931	George Hathaway-Eady	Conservative	
1935	William Leach	Labour	
1945	Maurice Webb	Labour	Minister of Food (1950–1951); Contested Bradford North following redistribution
1955	Constituency abolished, majority joined Bradford North, minority joined Bradford East and the reformed Bradford West		

== Elections ==
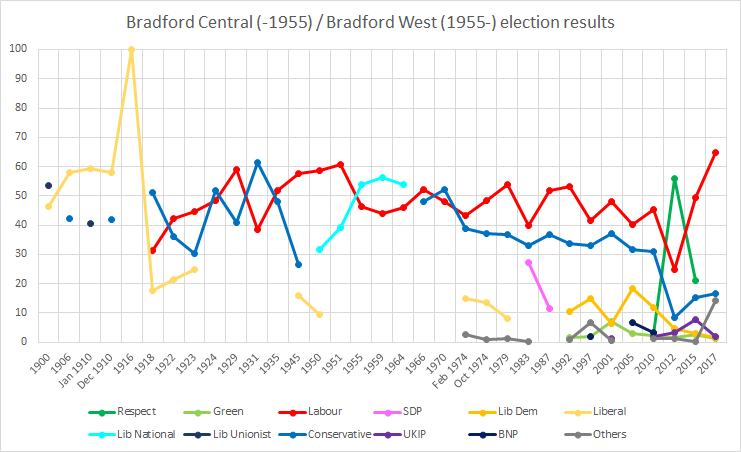
Bradford Central election results

=== Elections in the 1880s ===
1885 general election: Bradford Central
Party	Candidate	Votes	%
Liberal	William Edward Forster	5,275	58.6
Conservative	George Motley Waud	3,732	41.4
Majority		1,543	17.2
Turnout		9,007	79.7
Registered electors		11,297	
Liberal win (new seat)			

By-election 21 April 1886: Bradford Central
Party	Candidate	Votes	%	±%
Liberal	George Shaw Lefevre	4,407	54.9	−3.7
Conservative	Edward Hoare	3,627	45.1	+3.7
Majority		780	9.8	−4.4
Turnout		8,032	71.1	−8.6
Registered electors		11,297		
Liberal hold				

1886 general election: Bradford Central
Party	Candidate	Votes	%	±%
Liberal	George Shaw Lefevre	4,410	52.7	−2.2
Liberal Unionist	Charles Norwood	3,951	47.3	+2.2
Majority		459	5.4	−4.4
Turnout		8,361	74.0	+2.9
Registered electors		11,297		
Liberal hold				

=== Elections in the 1890s ===
1892 general election: Bradford Central
Party	Candidate	Votes	%	±%
Liberal	George Shaw Lefevre	4,710	52.6	−0.1
Liberal Unionist	Marquess of Lorne	4,245	47.4	+0.1
Majority		465	5.2	−0.2
Turnout		8,955	78.3	+4.3
Registered electors		11,434		
Liberal hold				

By-election, 23 August 1892: Bradford Central
Party	Candidate	Votes	%	±%
Liberal	George Shaw Lefevre	Unopposed		
Registered electors				
Liberal hold				

1895 general election: Bradford Central
Party	Candidate	Votes	%	±%
Liberal Unionist	James Leslie Wanklyn	4,024	50.3	+2.9
Liberal	George Shaw Lefevre	3,983	49.7	−2.9
Majority		41	0.6	N/A
Turnout		7,917	77.6	−0.7
Registered electors		10,316		
Liberal Unionist gain from Liberal		Swing	+2.9	

=== Elections in the 1900s ===
1900 general election: Bradford Central
Party	Candidate	Votes	%	±%
Liberal Unionist	James Leslie Wanklyn	4,634	53.6	+3.3
Liberal	A. Anderton	4,007	46.4	−3.3
Majority		627	7.2	+6.6
Turnout		8,641	82.8	+5.2
Registered electors		10,442		
Liberal Unionist hold				

1906 general election: Bradford Central
Party	Candidate	Votes	%	±%
Liberal	George Scott Robertson	4,954	57.8	+4.2
Conservative	Vicary Gibbs	3,614	42.2	−4.2
Majority		1,340	15.6	N/A
Turnout		8,568	85.9	+3.1
Registered electors		9,978		
Liberal gain from Liberal Unionist		Swing	4.2	

=== Elections in the 1910s ===
January 1910 general election: Bradford Central
Party	Candidate	Votes	%	±%
Liberal	George Scott Robertson	5,249	59.3	+1.5
Liberal Unionist	Viscount Howick	3,608	40.7	−1.5
Majority		1,641	18.6	+3.0
Turnout		8,857	89.9	+4.0
Registered electors		9,848		
Liberal hold				

December 1910 general election: Bradford Central
Party	Candidate	Votes	%	±%
Liberal	George Scott Robertson	4,677	58.0	−1.3
Conservative	G. H. R. Pauling	3,381	42.0	+1.3
Majority		1,296	16.0	−2.6
Turnout		8,058	81.8	−8.1
Registered electors		9,848		
Liberal hold				

1916 by-election: Bradford Central
Party	Candidate	Votes	%	±%
Liberal	Sir James Hill, Bt	Unopposed		
Registered electors				
Liberal hold				

1918 general election: Bradford Central
Party		Candidate	Votes	%
C	Unionist	Henry Butler Ratcliffe	12,434	51.0
	Labour	William Leach	7,636	31.3
	Liberal	James Hill	4,304	17.7
Majority			4,798	19.7
Turnout			24,374	54.7
Registered electors			44,549	
	Unionist win (new boundaries)			
C indicates candidate endorsed by the coalition government.

=== Elections in the 1920s ===
1922 general election: Bradford Central
Party	Candidate	Votes	%	±%
Labour	William Leach	14,296	42.4	+11.1
Unionist	Fred Denby Moore	12,171	36.1	−14.9
Liberal	Rev. William Paxton	7,250	21.5	+3.8
Majority		2,125	6.3	N/A
Turnout		33,717	75.4	+20.7
Registered electors		44,689		
Labour gain from Unionist		Swing	+13.0	

1923 general election: Bradford Central
Party	Candidate	Votes	%	±%
Labour	William Leach	14,241	44.6	+1.8
Unionist	Jonas Pearson	9,725	30.4	−5.7
Liberal	Rev. William Paxton	7,973	25.0	+3.5
Majority		4,516	14.2	+7.9
Turnout		31,939	71.0	−4.4
Registered electors		44,991		
Labour hold				

1924 general election: Bradford Central
Party	Candidate	Votes	%	±%
Unionist	Anthony Gadie	17,854	51.7	+21.3
Labour	William Leach	16,652	48.3	+3.7
Majority		1,202	3.4	N/A
Turnout		34,506	76.5	+5.5
Registered electors		45,127		
Unionist gain from Labour		Swing	+8.8	

1929 general election: Bradford Central
Party	Candidate	Votes	%	±%
Labour	William Leach	24,876	59.0	+10.7
Unionist	Anthony Gadie	17,265	41.0	−10.7
Majority		7,611	18.9	N/A
Turnout		42,141	80.0	+3.5
Registered electors		52,674		
Labour gain from Unionist		Swing	+10.7	

=== Elections in the 1930s ===
1931 general election: Bradford Central
Party	Candidate	Votes	%	±%
Conservative	George Hathaway-Eady	24,986	61.4	+20.4
Labour	William Leach	15,697	38.6	−20.4
Majority		9,289	22.8	N/A
Turnout		40,673	78.2	−1.8
Registered electors		51,996		
Conservative gain from Labour		Swing	+20.4	

1935 general election: Bradford Central
Party	Candidate	Votes	%	±%
Labour	William Leach	16,397	51.8	+13.2
Conservative	George Hathaway-Eady	15,241	48.2	−13.2
Majority		1,156	3.6	N/A
Turnout		31,638	66.0	−12.2
Registered electors		47,906		
Labour gain from Conservative		Swing	+13.2	

=== Elections in the 1940s ===
1945 general election: Bradford Central
Party	Candidate	Votes	%	±%
Labour	Maurice Webb	16,764	57.5	+6.7
Conservative	T. L. Dallas	7,776	26.6	−21.6
Liberal	Peter Edward Trench	4,655	15.9	New
Majority		8,988	30.9	+27.3
Turnout		29,205	76.2	+10.2
Registered electors		38,331		
Labour hold				

=== Elections in the 1950s ===
1950 general election: Bradford Central
Party	Candidate	Votes	%
Labour	Maurice Webb	24,822	58.7
Conservative	T. Boyce	13,375	31.7
Liberal	Charles Frederick Sarsby	4,063	9.6
Majority		11,447	27.1
Turnout		42,260	84.6
Registered electors		49,935	
Labour win (new boundaries)			

1951 general election: Bradford Central
Party	Candidate	Votes	%	±%
Labour	Maurice Webb	25,215	60.7	+2.0
Conservative	Arthur Tiley	16,343	39.3	+7.6
Majority		8,872	21.4	−5.7
Turnout		41,558	83.7	−0.9
Registered electors		49,625		
Labour hold				
