= India Medal =

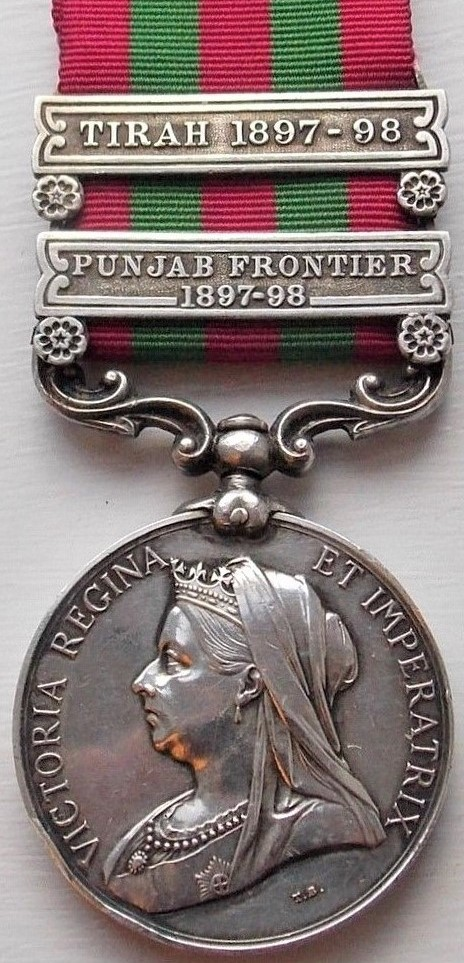
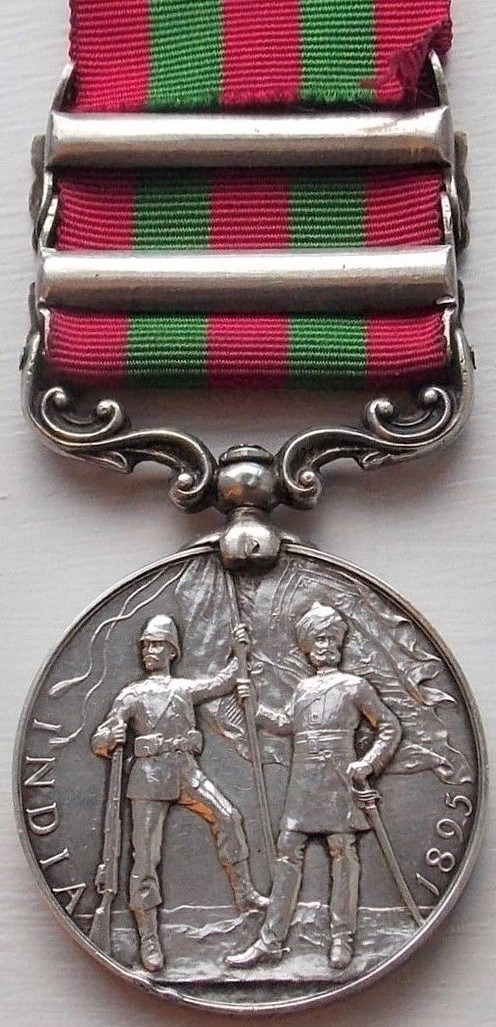
- Type: Campaign medal
- Awarded for: Campaign service.
- Description: Silver or bronze disk, 36mm diameter.
- Presented by: United Kingdom of Great Britain and Ireland
- Eligibility: British and Indian forces.
- Campaign(s): India 1895–1902.
- Clasps: Defence of Chitral 1895; Relief of Chitral 1895; Punjab Frontier 1897–98; Malakand 1897; Samana 1897; Tirah 1897–98; Waziristan 1901–02
- Established: 1896
- Ribbon bar

The India Medal was a campaign medal approved in 1896 for issue to officers and men of the British and Indian armies.

The India Medal was awarded for various minor military campaigns in India, chiefly for service on the North-West Frontier during 1895 to 1902. This medal replaced the India General Service Medal (1854). Each campaign was represented by a clasp on the ribbon; seven were sanctioned.

== Description ==
The medal was awarded in silver to soldiers of the British and Indian armies, and in bronze to native bearers and servants.

The obverse shows the profile of Queen Victoria or, for those awarded the medal with the Waziristan 1901–02 clasp, King Edward VII, both with a suitable inscription.
The reverse, designed by G. W. de Saulles, portrays a British and an Indian soldier together carrying a standard with the inscription "India 1895", although the Edward VII version omits the date.
The 1.25 inches (32 mm) wide ribbon had five equal stripes of red, green, red, green, red.

The name and details of the recipient were engraved on the edge of the medal, normally in running script.

=== Obverse variations ===
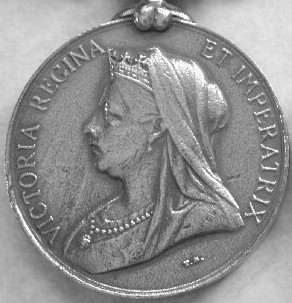
Victoria (1895-1901)

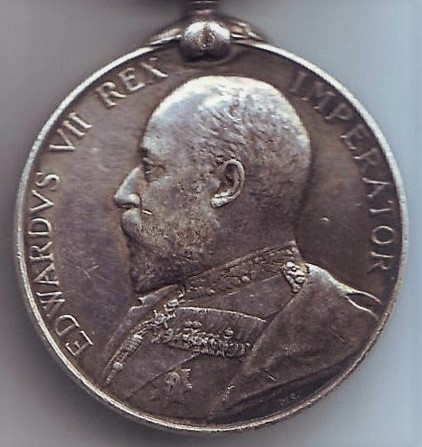
Edward VII, obverse for Waziristan 1901-02

== Clasps ==
The following clasps were issued with the medal:

- Defence of Chitral 1895

3 March – 13 April 1895

- Relief of Chitral 1895

7 March – 15 August 1895

- Punjab Frontier 1897–98

10 June 1897 – 6 April 1898

- Malakand 1897

26 July – 2 August 1897 (Awarded to troops involved in the Siege of Malakand.)

- Samana 1897

2 August – 2 October 1897

- Tirah 1897–98

2 October 1897 – 6 April 1898

- Waziristan 1901–02

23 November 1901 – 10 March 1902

== Bibliography ==
- Barthorp, Michael. 2002. Afghan Wars and the North-West Frontier 1839–1947 Cassell. ISBN 0-304-36294-8
- Joslin, Litherland, and Simpkin (eds), British Battles and Medals, (1988), Spink
- Mackay, J. and Mussel, J. (eds) – Medals Yearbook – 2006, (2005), Token Publishing.
- Mussell, John W. (ed) – Medals Yearbook – 2015, Token Publishing.ISBN 978-1-908-828-16-3
- Wilkinson-Latham, Robert. 1977. North-west Frontier 1837–1947 Osprey Publishing. ISBN 0-85045-275-9
