= Iraghi =

Traditional headwear from Gilgit Baltistan, Pakistan

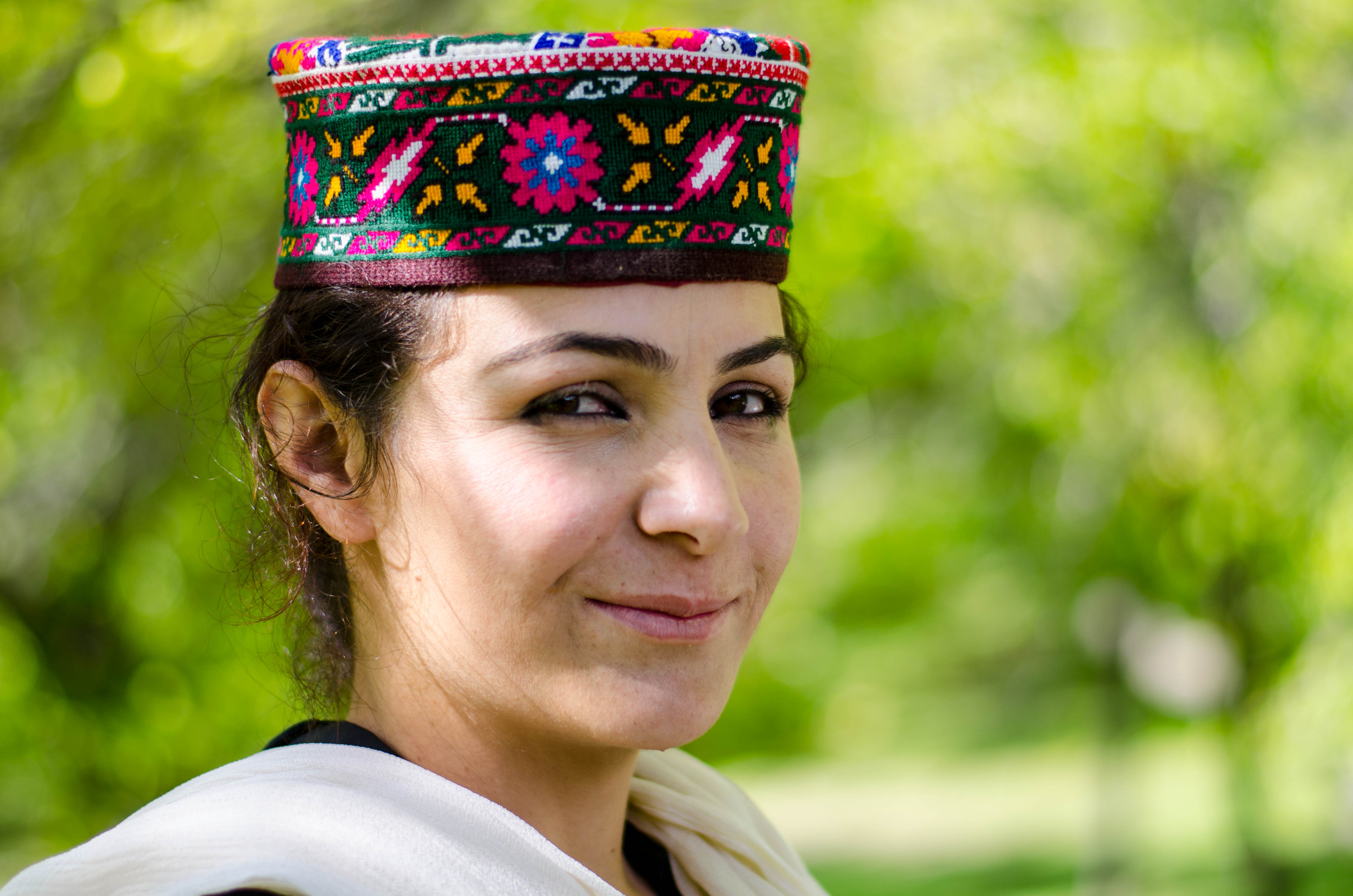
- A woman from Hunza wearing Iraghi
- Type: Pillbox hat
- Material: Wool, with embroidery of silk thread
- Place of origin: Gilgit-Baltistan, Pakistan

The Iraghi, also known as khoi (Shina and Khowar: کھوئی), phartsun (Brushaski: پھرتن) and sekeed (Wakhi: سکید), is a traditional pillbox hat originating from and predominantly used in Gilgit-Baltistan and Chitral, Pakistan.

It is worn by women and features colourful embroidery of silk thread on which the designs represents wild animals, their paw prints, birds, leaves and body parts of insects. Silver jewellery, called silsila, may also be attached to its front. It takes around two months, working two to three hours a day, to prepare one such hat. The hat is considered as a symbol of cultural identity in the region.

== See also ==
- Pakol
- Sindhi cap
