= Arthur David McCormick =

British painter

Arthur David McCormick FRGS (Coleraine 14 October 1860 – 1943) was a British illustrator and painter of landscapes, historical scenes, naval subjects, and genre scenes.

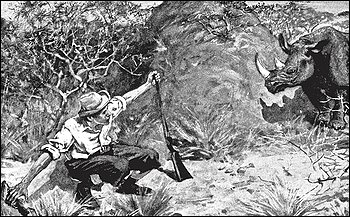
Illustration by McCormick. In: Ewart Grogan: From the Cape to Cairo (1900)

McCormick was born in Ulster and, after education at local schools, went to London on the same ship with Hugh Thomson. McCormick was educated at the Royal College of Art in 1883–1886. He worked for The English Illustrated Magazine. He was in 1892–1893 an artist on Sir Martin Conway's expedition to the Karakoram subrange of the Himalayas and in 1895 an artist on Clinton T. Dent's expedition to the Caucasus Mountains. His first exhibition at the Royal Academy of Art was in 1889, and through the end of 1904 he exhibited there eleven paintings, including Sakar, India: moonlight (1895) and A Hunter's Shrine, Central Caucasus (1901). In 1927 he painted Head of a Sailor for John Player & Sons for the promotion of Player's Navy Cut cigarettes.
