= Robert Low (Indian Army officer) =

British officer in the British Indian Army

General Sir Robert Low GCB
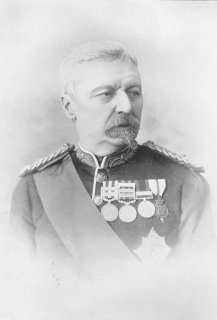
- Born: 28 January 1838
- Died: 4 August 1911 (aged 73)
- Military career
- Allegiance: United Kingdom / British Empire
- Branch: Bengal Army; British Indian Army
- Service years: 1854–1905
- Rank: General
- Commands: Bombay Command
- Conflicts: Indian Rebellion of 1857; Second Anglo-Afghan War; Chitral Expedition
- Awards: Knight Grand Cross of the Order of the Bath

General Sir Robert Cunliffe Low, GCB (28 January 1838 – 4 August 1911) was a British officer in the British Indian Army.

== Military career ==
Born the son of General Sir John Low, Low was commissioned into the Bengal Army in 1854. He served with the Delhi Field Force during the response to the Indian Rebellion of 1857 and also fought in the Second Anglo-Afghan War in 1879. He became commander of Bareilly district in 1886 and commander of Lucknow district in 1892. He was appointed commander-in-chief of the Chitral Expedition in 1895 in which role he was sent by the British authorities to relieve the fort at Chitral which was under siege after a local coup. After the death of the old ruler power changed hands several times. An intervening British force of about 400 men was besieged in the fort until it was relieved. He went on to become Commander-in-Chief of Bombay Command in 1898 before retiring in 1905.

In June 1909 the King appointed Low, to be Keeper of the Jewel House at the Tower of London, a position that he held until his death on 4 August 1911.

Military offices
| Preceded by Sir Charles Nairne | C-in-C, Bombay Command; 1898–1903 | Succeeded by Sir Archibald Hunter |
