= James Graves Kelly =

Officer in the British Indian Army

- Born: 1843
- Died: 1923 (aged 79–80)
- Military career
- Allegiance: United Kingdom
- Branch: British Indian Army
- Rank: Lieutenant Colonel
- Conflicts: Hazara Expedition; Miranzai Expedition; Chitral Expedition

Colonel James Graves Kelly (November 28, 1843 – June 20, 1923) was an officer in the British Indian Army. He served in the Hazara Expedition, Miranzai Expedition and most famously in the Chitral Expedition.
