= Battle of Parkutta =

1948 military engagement during the Indo-Pakistani War of 1947–1948

- Part of Indo-Pakistani War of 1947–1948
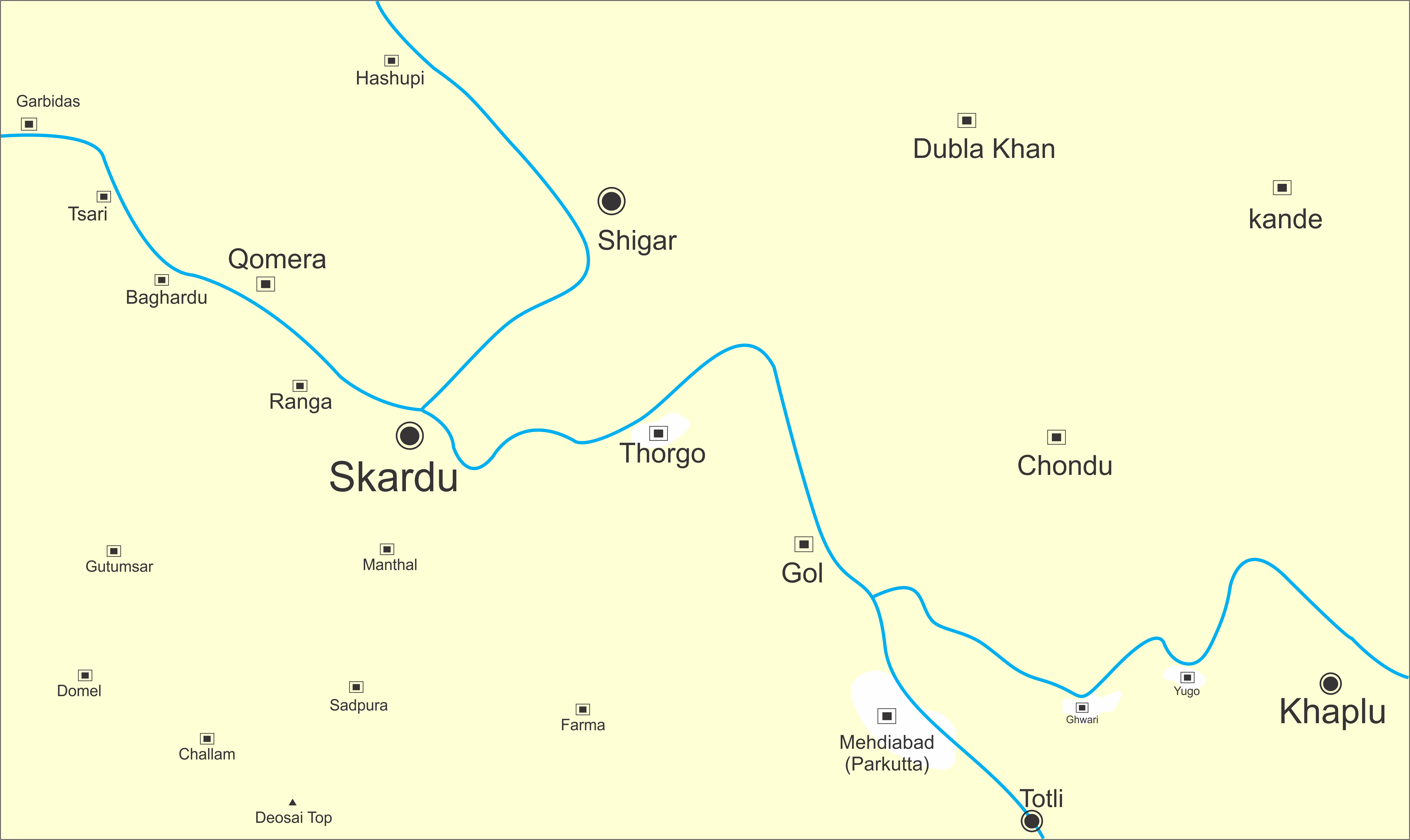
Date	14 April – 17 May 1948
Location	Parkutta, Kharmang District, Gilgit-Baltistan
Result	Pakistani victory
Territorial changes	Capture of Parkutta by the Gilgit Scouts; Pakistani control consolidated over the Indus Valley route between Parkutta and Kargil (Note: The three main inhabited sections of the Indus River Valley in Baltistan — Kharmang, Skardu, and Roundu — are located along this route.)

Belligerents
Dominion of Pakistan	Dominion of India; Jammu and Kashmir

Commanders and leaders
Maj. Ehsan Ali; Lt. Muhammad Khan; Capt. Nek Alam	Lt. Col. Sampuran Singh; Lt. Col. Kirpal Singh (WIA)

Units involved
Gilgit Scouts (Ibex Force)	Z Brigade * 5th JAK Infantry * 7th JAK Infantry

Casualties and losses
Unknown	Heavy

The Battle of Parkutta was a military engagement during the Indo-Pakistani War of 1947–1948, fought in the Gilgit-Baltistan sector between 14 April and 17 May 1948. The engagement took place at Parkutta, a location in the Kharmang valley approximately 40 miles from Skardu, between the Gilgit Scouts' Ibex Force and the Jammu and Kashmir relief column designated Z Brigade. What began as a planned ambush by the Ibex Force to intercept and halt Z Brigade developed into a month-long engagement lasting thirty-three days.

The Gilgit Scouts, commanded by Major Ehsan Ali, intended to prevent Z Brigade from reinforcing the besieged Skardu garrison. By 17 May 1948, Parkutta had been captured and the JAK relief column had withdrawn towards Kharmang, securing Pakistani control of the Indus Valley route in this sector.

== Background ==
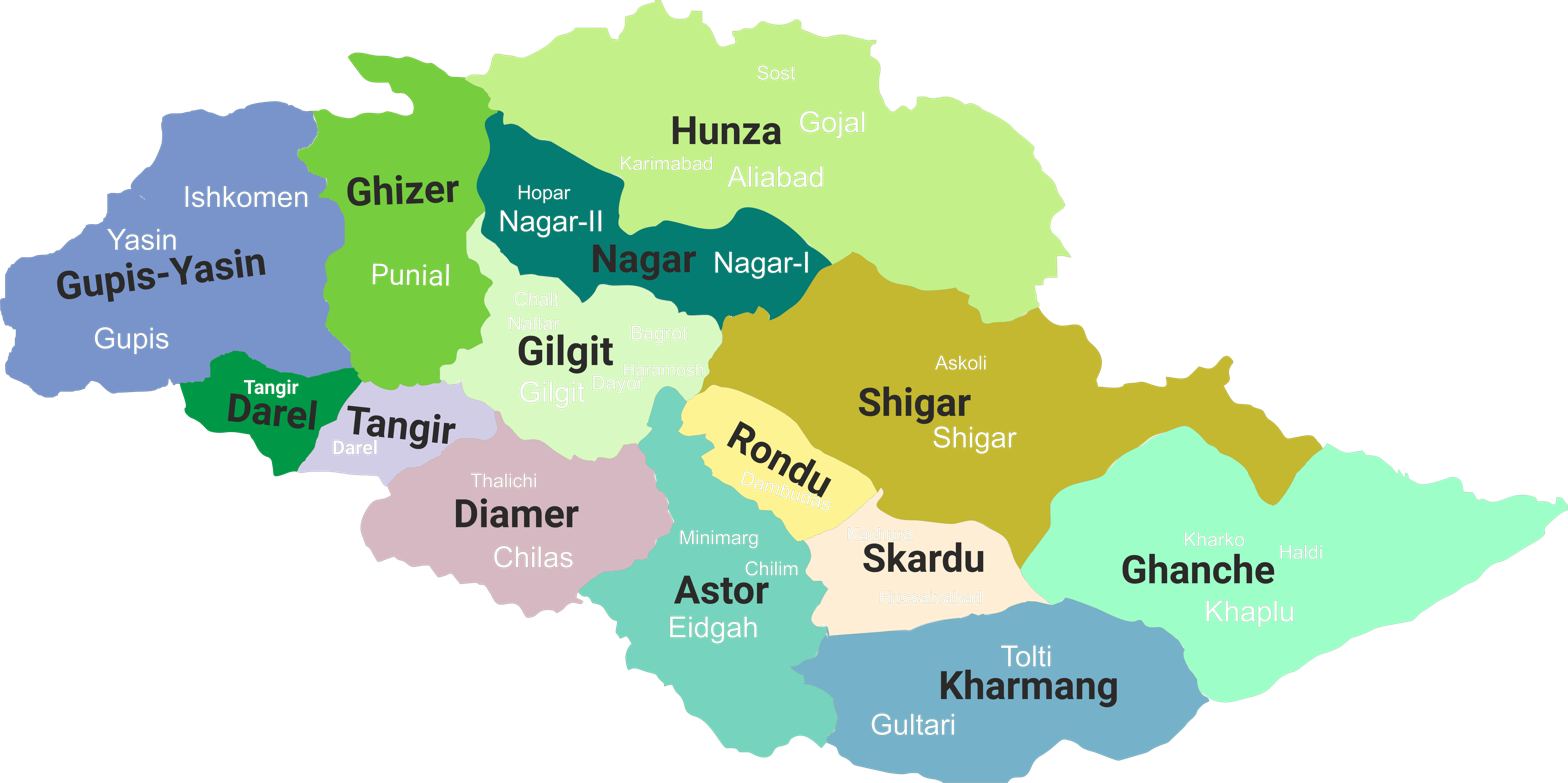
Parkutta is located in Kharmang District in modern-day Gilgit-Baltistan.

=== Geography ===
Parkutta lies on the route between Kargil and Skardu, approximately 40 miles from Skardu. On the right bank of the Indus River at this location stand the villages of Kharmang and Marol; Bagicha and Totli lie on the left bank. Near the Kharmang gorge, a rope bridge spans the Indus, which flows rapidly through the narrow valley at this point.

=== Preparations ===
==== Gilgit Scouts ====
Following the retreat of the surviving Indian forces after the Battle of Thorgo, Major Ehsan Ali received intelligence that the Jammu and Kashmir command had formed Z Brigade for the relief of the Skardu garrison. He dispatched one hundred troops under the command of Lieutenant Muhammad Khan to intercept the relief column at Parkutta. Captain Nek Alam and Subedar Dost Muhammad subsequently joined with additional forces. Lieutenant Muhammad Khan established his headquarters at Hotong-Chan near Charkatipari, while troops were positioned along the riverbanks and on the heights above.

==== Z Brigade ====
Z Brigade was assembled as a third attempt to reinforce the Skardu garrison. It comprised A and B Companies of the 7th Jammu and Kashmir Infantry Battalion, merged with the remnants of the previous relief column and the troops under Major Coutts. The brigade advanced to Parkutta to await further reinforcements from the 5th Jammu and Kashmir Infantry.

On 5 March, most of the 5th Jammu and Kashmir Infantry under Lieutenant Colonel Kirpal Singh were airlifted to Srinagar, with some troops retained at the Pakistan border. The B Company advanced first, later joined by troops of D Company and a column from A Company, which encountered resistance near Parkutta. Major Coutts was ordered to return to Kargil to establish a headquarters there, while Lieutenant Colonel Kirpal Singh was placed in overall command. The Raja of Totli provided four hundred porters to support the Jammu and Kashmir forces.

== Battle ==
=== Ambush ===
Lieutenant Colonel Sampuran Singh advanced with his force towards Parkutta, covering approximately 50 miles in fourteen days. The column reached Simrak on 19 April; on 20 April, two companies were sent ahead and made contact with Gilgit Scout positions. The Jammu and Kashmir troops also captured an important feature above Panda village, which gave them a tactical advantage over the Parkutta approach.

The Gilgit Scouts were compelled to vacate a nearby hill position. Subedar Dost Muhammad conducted a flanking movement via the Shyok River and crossed the Chorbat Pass over the course of a month. The Gilgit Scouts launched their surprise attack in the early morning of 10 May. Lieutenant Colonel Kirpal Singh departed for Parkutta on the same day with his troops.

The vanguard of the Jammu and Kashmir column, numbering approximately 150 men, was ambushed at Mirpigund in the open with no cover, resulting in heavy casualties. The troops scattered to return fire. Lieutenant Colonel Kirpal Singh sent orders to the companies at Parkutta to provide assistance, but those troops were simultaneously engaged and unable to respond. The Parkutta garrison abandoned its position and fell back to Mirpigund, a withdrawal that took five days.

At Kamango, approximately five miles towards Kargil from Parkutta, the Gilgit Scouts despatched a platoon to intercept Lieutenant Colonel Kirpal Singh's column in a narrow gorge. The resulting engagement caused serious casualties and the JAK troops were unable to withdraw from the valley without difficulty. On 12 May, Lieutenant Colonel Sampuran Singh withdrew from Ladakh through Marol. By 16 May, Lieutenant Colonel Kirpal Singh, despite continuing resistance, retreated with his men and regrouped with the battalion headquarters before withdrawing to Totli.

== Aftermath ==
On 17 May 1948, the Gilgit Scouts captured Parkutta, seizing substantial quantities of arms and ammunition in a second attack. Lieutenant Colonel Kirpal Singh and his men made for Kharmang.

With the Ibex Force engaged at both the Skardu siege and along the Parkutta–Kargil axis, Colonel Pasha despatched the Eskimo Force of the Gilgit Scouts towards Kargil. Major Ehsan Ali sent a platoon towards Nubra to close the land routes available for Indian reinforcements, while himself leading the pursuit of the retreating JAK column.

== See also ==
- Nubra
- Action at Tsari
- Battle of Thorgo
- Military operations in Ladakh (1948)
- Siege of Skardu

== Sources ==
=== Works cited ===
- Cheema, Amar (2014). The Crimson Chinar: The Kashmir Conflict – A Politico-Military Perspective. United Service Institution of India. ISBN 9788170623014.
- Dani, Ahmad Hasan (1989). History of Northern Areas of Pakistan. National Institute of Historical and Cultural Research. ISBN 9789694150161.
- Gulati, M. N. (2000). Military Plight of Pakistan: Indo-Pak War, 1947–48. Vol. 1. Manas Publications. ISBN 9788170491231.
- Mahajan, Skumar (1973). Debacle in Baltistan. New Delhi: A. K. Corporation.
- Palit, D. K. (1972). Jammu and Kashmir Arms: History of the J & K Rifles. Palit & Dutt.
- Prasad, S. N. (1987). History of Operations in Jammu and Kashmir, 1947–48. History Division, Ministry of Defence, Government of India.
- S. Bloeria, Sudhir (2021). Battlefield Zojila – 1948. VIJ Books (India) PVT Limited. ISBN 9789388161145.
- Saraf, Muhammad Yusuf (2015) [first published 1979 by Ferozsons]. Kashmiris Fight for Freedom. Vol. 2. Mirpur: National Institute of Kashmir Studies.
- Singh, K. Brahma (1990). History of Jammu and Kashmir Rifles, 1820–1956: The State Force Background. Lancer International. ISBN 9788170620914.
- Suharwardy, Abdul Haq (1983). Tragedy in Kashmir. Wajidalis.
- Jaffri, Imran Haider (Summer 2019). "Bakhtawar Shah – A Legendary Character of Gilgit-Baltistan Liberation War". Bugle and Trumpet. I. Army Institute of Military History, Pakistan. Archived from the original on 27 July 2024.

Preceded by Battle of Thorgo	Battles of the Indo-Pakistani war of 1947; Battle of Parkutta	Succeeded by Kharmang Ambush
