= Ibex Force =

- Active: 1948
- Country: Pakistan
- Allegiance: Pakistan Army
- Branch: Gilgit Scouts
- Type: Paramilitary
- Role: Mountain Warfare
- Size: 600+ fighters
- Garrison/HQ: Gilgit
- Engagements: Indo-Pakistani War of 1947-1948; Siege of Skardu; Battle of Thorgo; Action at Tsari

Commanders
- Notable commanders: Ehsan Ali; Babar Khan

The Ibex Force was a specialized military unit that played a crucial role in the defense and strategic operations of Gilgit-Baltistan during the First Kashmir War (1947–1948). Formed as an auxiliary force within the Gilgit Scouts in 1948, the Ibex Force was instrumental in securing key territories and engaging in tactical missions against J&K and Indian armed forces in the region. The unit was disbanded in 1948 after the successful military operations.

== Formation and purpose ==
The Ibex Force was established on 1 February 1948 in Harmosh, 25 miles east of Gilgit, as part of the broader Gilgit Scouts, a paramilitary force responsible for maintaining security in the rugged and mountainous terrain of Gilgit-Baltistan. The formation of the unit was prompted by the rebellion against Dogra rule and the subsequent need for a well-trained, locally recruited force to defend the newly liberated region.

Lieutenant Babar Khan, along with Major Ehsan Ali and Captain Muhammad Khan, organized the Ibex Force. This force comprised approximately 600 personnel, including elements of the Gilgit Scouts, Chitral Scouts, deserters from the 6 Jammu and Kashmir Infantry, and local militia. The Ibex Force was instrumental in various military engagements in the region during the conflict. On the night of October 31, 1947, Major William Brown and Subedar Major Babar Khan led the Gilgit Scouts on a rebellion that led to the surrender of Brigadier Ghansara Singh, the Dogra State Governor, and the accession of the Gilgit Agency to the Dominion of Pakistan.

== Indo-Pakistani War of 1947-48 ==
Following the Gilgit Rebellion, The Ibex Force was actively involved in major military operations during the First Kashmir War, Particularly paving the way for the capture of Skardu. Under the command of Major Raja Muhammad Babar Khan, the unit participated in several key battles. The Ibex force were involved in the Action at Tsari as they launched an assault on the Tsari outposts near Skardu. The operation resulted in the elimination of the state forces' outposts and paved the way for further advances towards Skardu Valley.

The leading column of Ibex Force left Harmosh for Skardu. The distance from Gilgit to Skardu is 160 miles and a 20-day journey, but the liberation forces covered it in 14 days, that too in winter.

The Ibex Force also played a pivotal role during the Battle of Thorgo. They successfully ambushed a relief column dispatched to reinforce the besieged Skardu garrison, inflicting heavy casualties on the J&K and Indian Forces and capturing significant supplies. This victory further weakened the opposing forces' hold in the region. Elements of Ibex Force also took part in the Siege of Skardu, contributing to the eventual fall of the garrison. and the capture of Colonel Sher Jung Thapa.

The Ibex Force was composed mainly of local recruits from Gilgit-Baltistan, chosen for their knowledge of the terrain and their resilience in high-altitude warfare. They underwent rigorous training, focusing on guerrilla warfare tactic, mountain and winter survival, ambush and counter-insurgency strategies and weapons handling and marksmanship.

== Legacy and disbandment ==
Following the successful military operations of 1948, the Ibex Force was disbanded, and its members were either integrated into other military formations such as the Northern Light Infantry or returned to civilian life. Many members of the Ibex Force, including their commander Major Raja Muhammad Babar Khan, who was awarded the Sitara-e-Quaid-e-Azam by Field Marshal Ayub Khan. Their efforts were instrumental in shaping the modern defense structure of the region.
