= Babar Khan (officer) =

Pakistani military officer (d. 1973)

Babar Khan SQA
- راجہ محمد بابر خان
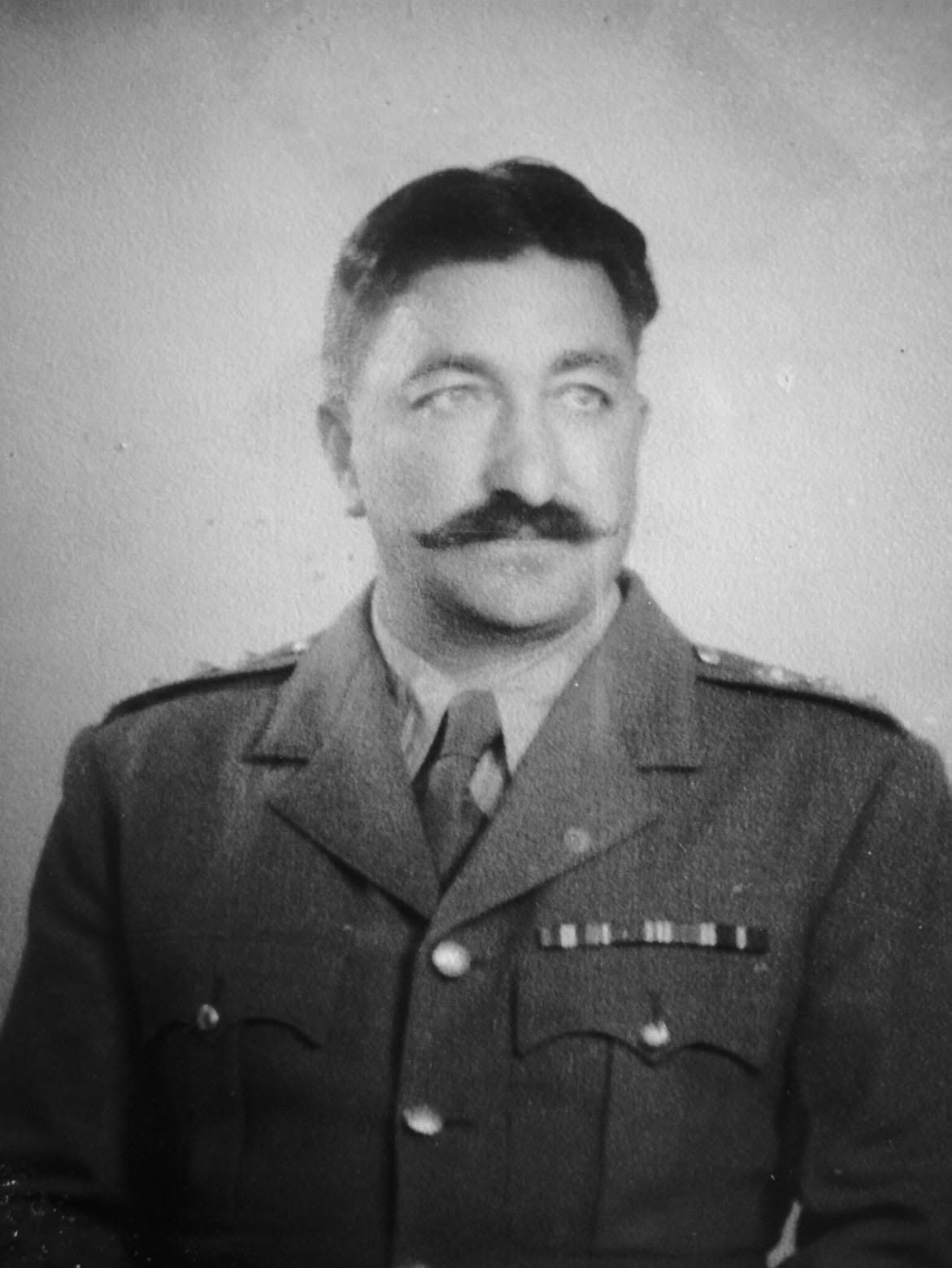
- A portrait of Babar Khan
- Born: 25 December 1917; Nagar, Gilgit Agency, British India
- Died: 22 October 1973 (aged 55); Gilgit, Northern Areas, Pakistan
- Military career
- Allegiance: British India; Pakistan
- Branch: British Indian Army (1935–1947); J&K State Forces (1947); Pakistan Army (1947–1959)
- Service years: 1935—1959
- Rank: Major
- Unit: Gilgit Scouts
- Commands: Ibex Force
- Conflicts: Indo-Pakistani War of 1947-1948; Gilgit Rebellion; Battle of Thorgo; Action at Tsari; Battle of Muzaffarabad
- Awards: Sitara-i-Quaid-e-Azam; Fakhr-i-Kashmir
- Police career
- Allegiance: Pakistan
- Branch: Gilgit Baltistan Police
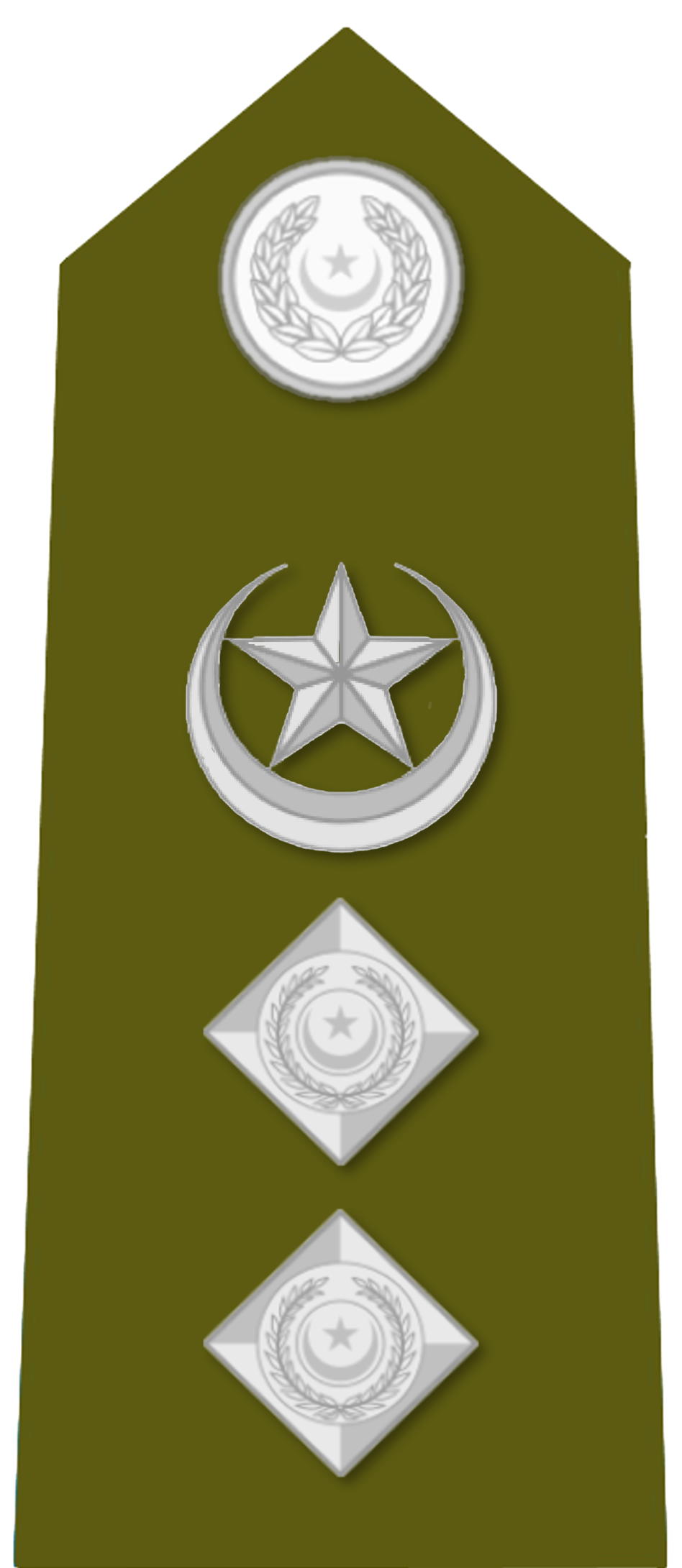
- Rank: Assistant Inspector General

Raja Muhammad Babar Khan was a Pakistani military officer and later a senior police officer. He is best known for his actions during he First Kashmir War, as the commander of the Ibex Force under the Gilgit Scouts. A key figure in the Gilgit Rebellion, he played an important role in the liberation of Gilgit-Baltistan from Dogra rule and led successful military operations against opposing forces in the region.

== Early life and education ==
Khan was born on 25 December 1917, in the royal palace of Nagar, a princely state in the Gilgit Agency. He was the son of Sir Shah Sikander Khan, the Mir of Nagar. He received his education from Gilgit high school.

== Role in the Gilgit Rebellion ==
On 31 October 1947, Major William Brown and Subedar Major Babar Khan led the Gilgit Scouts too surround the Governor's House in Gilgit,. They demanded the surrender of Brigadier Ghansara Singh, the then Dogra State Governor.

This operation led to the surrender of Brigadier Ghansara Singh on 1 November 1947 and the accession of the Gilgit Agency to the Dominion of Pakistan, marking a remarkable change in the history.

On 2 November, for the first time the Pakistani flag was raised on the Gilgit Scout Lines, under the leadership of Major Brown, proclaiming Gilgit to be a part of Pakistan.

== Formation of Ibex Force ==
During the early hours of 1948, Lt. Babar Khan, Major Ehsan and Capt Muhammad founded Ibex force. The force initially had almost 600 troops, including Gilgit Scouts, Chitral scouts and 6 Jammu and Kashmir Infantry. Reportedly, some local militias also joined the troops. The force had fought the Indo-Pakistani War of 1947-1948, notably Siege of Skardu.

== Engagements in the First Kashmir War ==
Khan was a key figure in the First Kashmir War, leading crucial missions that helped secure victories. In February 1948, he commanded the "D" Wing of the Ibex Force during the attack on Tsari outposts near Skardu. This successful operation cleared enemy positions and allowed further advances. The following month, during the Battle of Thorgo, his tactics led the Gilgit Scouts to ambush an enemy relief column, which had headed for Skardu. The attack caused heavy casualties for the opposing forces and captured crucial supplies. His leadership in these battles proved vital to the overall success of the campaign.

== Later life ==
Khan retired from the army in 1962 as Major. He was awarded Sitara-e-Quaid-e-Azam. The locals gave him the title "Fakhr-e-Kashmir" (ur : Pride of Kashmir). After retiring from military, he had joined the Police as SP, rose up to the rank of AIG. He died on 22 October 1973.
