= Military operations in Ladakh (1948) =

Operations during the Indo-Pakistani war

1947 Military operations in Ladakh
- Part of the Kashmir conflict and Indo-Pakistani War of 1947–1948
- Leh (Ladakh)
Date	March 1948 – December 1948
Location	Ladakh Wazarat, Jammu and Kashmir
Result	Indian victory
Territorial changes	Skardu comes under Pakistani control; Kargil and Leh captured by Indian forces

Belligerents
Indian Army; 2/4 Gorkha Rifles (1 company); 2/8 Gorkha Rifles (2 companies); 77 Parachute Brigade; 7 Cavalry Jammu and Kashmir State Forces detachment	pro-Pakistani troops: Ibex Force; Gilgit Scouts; Chitral Scouts; Chitral state forces; Hunza state forces; Supported by: Pakistan

Commanders and leaders
Gen. K.S. Thimayya Lt. Col. H.S. Parab	Maj. Ehsan Ali Khan; Col. Burhan-ud-Din; Col. Mata-ul-Mulk; Lt. Babar Khan

Military operations were carried out by the Indian Army during the India–Pakistan war of 1947–1948 against the pro-Pakistani forces of Ibex Force and Chitral State Bodyguard in the erstwhile Ladakh Wazarat of the princely state of Jammu and Kashmir.

== Relief of Leh ==
Ibex Force, which had been raised by Colonel Pasha from the Gilgit Scouts and local volunteers, had besieged Skardu in early 1948. It was vital that Leh, the next likely target, be relieved before it was attacked by the Ibex Force. Maj Prithi Chand, a Lahauli officer with a band of 40 volunteers from the 2nd Battalion, Dogra Regiment began a mid-winter ascent of Zojila pass on 16 February 1948, with rifles and ammunition for the garrison. They reached Leh on 8 March, where an ad-hoc force for defence was organised, followed soon by a Jammu and Kashmir State Forces detachment bringing additional weapons.

== Reinforcement of Leh ==
The slow advance of raiders permitted reinforcement of Leh by air by a company of 2nd Battalion, 4 Gorkha Rifles (2/4 GR) and later a company of 2nd Battalion, 8th Gorkha Rifles (2/8 GR) by air just in time to repulse the raiders. Had the raiders kept advancing they could have captured Leh easily. The garrison of Leh held despite shortage of troops, weapons and ammunition, sickness and fatigue. In August another company of 2/8 GR was flown in by air and the remaining part of the battalion, codenamed Arjun column, with a large column of supplies on mules, trekked to Leh from Manali. Another large mule column, codenamed Chapati column, followed in September to provide adequate supplies for the winter. Lt Col (later Col) HS Parab, CO 2/8 GR, was airlifted to Leh on 23 Aug and later designated Commander, Leh Brigade (though the force never exceeded two battalions in strength). Spirited small unit actions and guerrilla raids on both banks of the Indus effectively held the raiders at bay throughout September and October.

== Capture of Zoji La ==
When Zoji La was captured by the pro-Pakistani forces in May 1948, it was vital for the Indians that the pass be recaptured before winter so as to relieve Leh. An unsuccessful frontal attack was launched by 77 Parachute Brigade under Brig Hiralal Atal to capture Zoji La pass. Meanwhile, on 14 August Indian garrison at Skardu surrendered to Chitral State Forces under Colonel Mata ul-Mulk. Operation Duck, the earlier epithet for this assault, was renamed as Operation Bison by Lt Gen Cariappa, the Western Army commander.

M5 Stuart light tanks of 7 Cavalry were moved in dismantled conditions through Srinagar to Baltal while the superhuman efforts of two field companies of the Madras Sappers working day and night improved the mule track from Baltal up the Zoji La to Gumri. The surprise attack on 1 November by the brigade with armour, led by the division commander Thimayya in the lead tank, and supported by two regiments of 25 pounders and a regiment of 3.7 inch guns, saw the enemy being surprised. The pass was forced and the enemy pushed back to Matayan.

== Liberation of Leh and Kargil ==
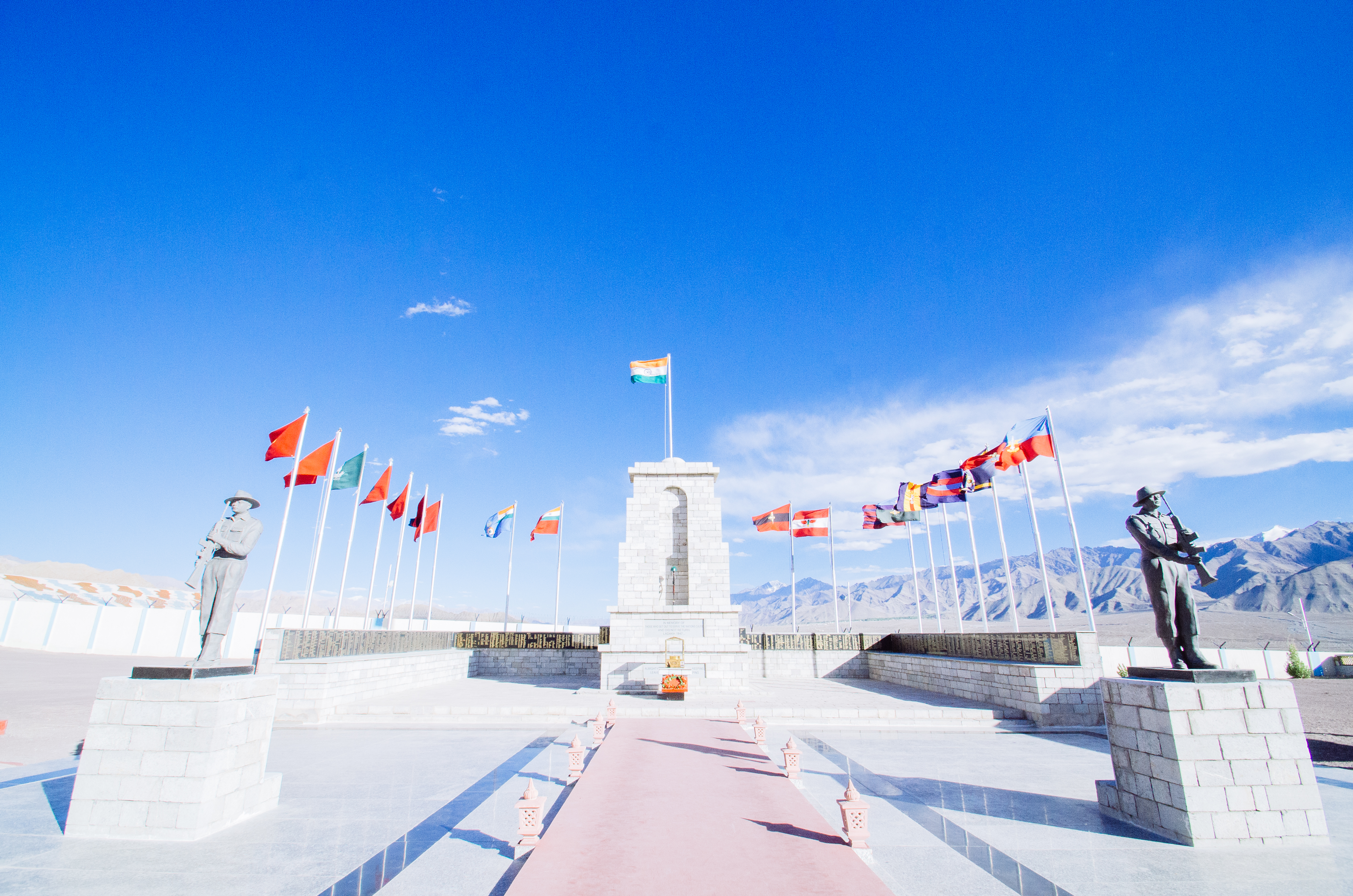
1947 Ladakh War Memorial of the Indian Army

Since the pro-Pakistani forces were inactive on the Leh front during 77 Para Brigade's operations in Zoji La, Leh Brigade went onto the offensive advancing from Tharu to Marol on the north bank of the Indus and from Chilling to Lamayuru to Kargil on the south bank. Another detachment advanced along the Shyok River clearing opposition on that axis and securing the Nubra Valley flank.

On the Zoji La front, 77 Parachute Brigade launched a deliberate attack and captured Matayan on 13 November and Dras on 15 November. The brigade linked up on 24 November at Kargil with Indian troops advancing from Leh while the Pakistani positions withdrew northwards toward Skardu. The Indian pursuit was halted by fierce military action at Chathatang as the Pakistani soldiers blew themselves under Indian tanks to save their posts, 5 km ahead of the Marol fork of the Indus. The strong Pakistani defenses, on both banks of the Indus, resisted till 1 January 1949 when a ceasefire was called.

== See also ==
- Indo-Pakistani wars and conflicts
- Kargil war
