= Battle of Thorgo =

Battle during First Kashmir war

- Part of Kashmir conflict and the Indo-Pakistani war of 1947–1948
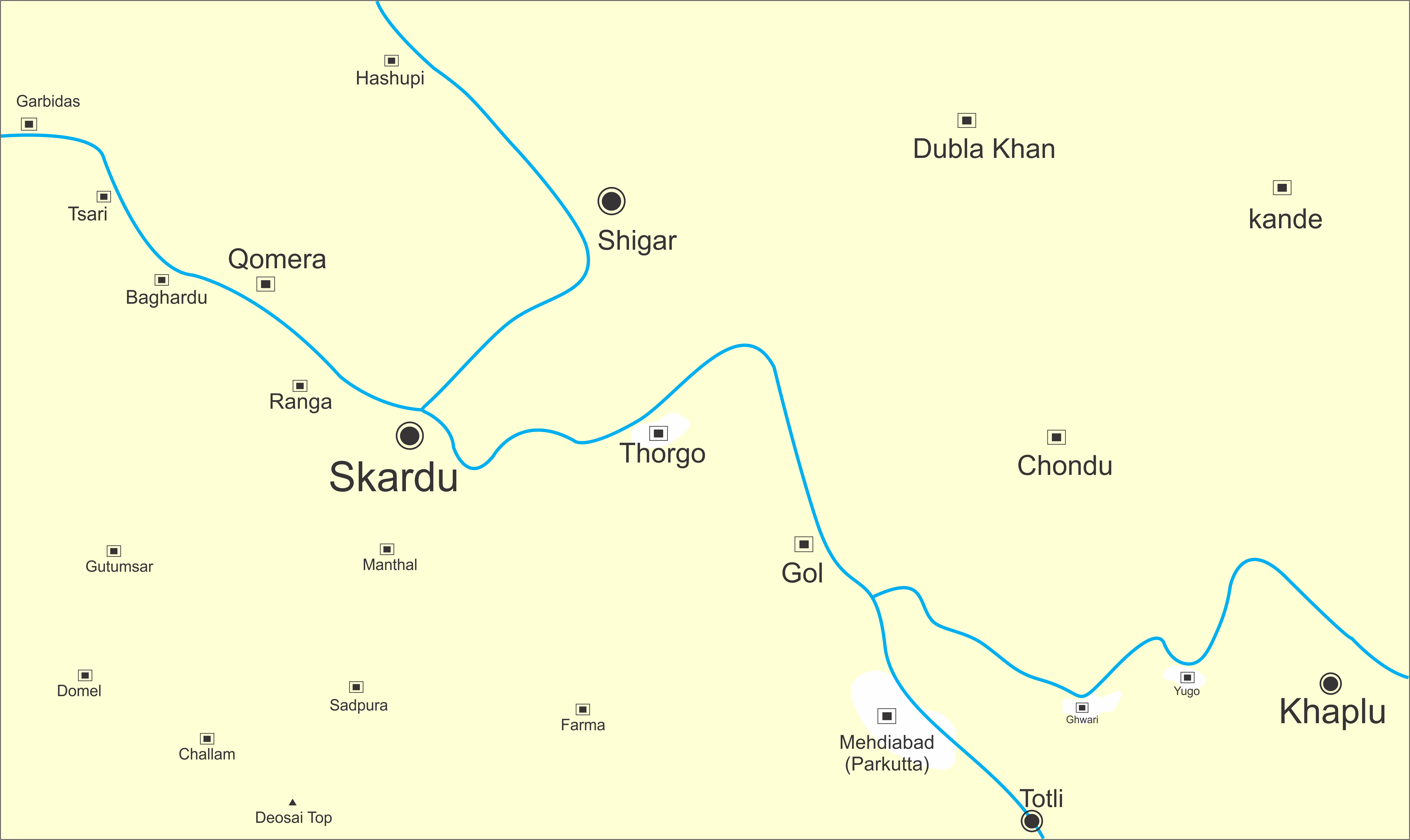
- Map of localities around Skardu region
Date	16–18 March 1948
Location	Thorgo near Skardu, Pakistan 35.3010°N 75.74434°E
Result	Pakistani victory: Relief column defeated; Remaining forces retreat

Belligerents
Dominion of Pakistan	Dominion of India: (Jammu and Kashmir (princely state)) Jammu and Kashmir (Note: The Jammu and Kashmir force is also referred as State troops or forces)

Commanders and leaders
Maj.Ehsan Ali; Lieu.Babar; Capt.Nek Alam	(Jammu and Kashmir (princely state)) Faqir Singh (WIA) (India) Major.Coutts

Units involved
Gilgit Scouts: Ibex Force; Local Volunteers	(Jammu and Kashmir (princely state)) 6 J&K Infantry: Biscuit Column

Strength
~3 Platoons, Approximately (100–300)	~1 company (350 men); Accompanied by: ~600 Jawans,400 Porters,200 horses

Casualties and losses
Unknown	Pakistani Sources: 150 killed, 75000 rounds of 303 ammo, (2-3) Mortar, rifles, Sten-guns, MMG's; Indian Sources: 26 killed, 7 missing presumed killed, 18 wounded, 27 rifles, 5 Sten guns, 2 VB Machine guns, 64000 rounds of rifle ammunition, 84 Hand grenades, 51 HE bombs of 2-mch mortar, 204 HE bombs of 3-mch mortar.

The Battle of Thorgo (also known as the Thorgo Incident (Note: The Inscription written at the monument built in Thorgo refers to it as the Thorgo incident, however the inscription written in Urdu refers it as (معرکہ تھورگو) which means Battle of Thorgo.) or Nurbachung ambush, also spelled as Thurgo or Thergo,) was a military engagement during the Indo-Pakistani war of 1947–1948 in the Gilgit-Baltistan sector of northern Kashmir administered by Pakistan. The battle took place from March 16 to March 18, 1948. The Gilgit Scouts, a paramilitary force from northern Pakistan, fought against the Jammu and Kashmir state forces. The Gilgit Scouts were informed of a relief column dispatched from Indian headquarters at Srinagar to reinforce the besieged Skardu garrison of the Jammu and Kashmir state forces. The Scouts established an ambush at Thorgo Pari between Gol and Skardu. (Note: The word Pari means Peak in Urdu spelled using Indian English.) When the relief column arrived, the Scouts launched their attack, hurling large rocks, resulting in heavy casualties including the wounding of Brigadier Faqir Singh.

The remnants of the defeated relief column retreated to Kargil under Major Coutts, while the wounded Brigadier Faqir Singh was evacuated to the headquarters at Srinagar. Following the defeat of the Indian relief column near Gol, the Gilgit Scouts intensified their efforts against the Skardu garrison. Major Ehsan was informed that additional Indian reinforcements codenamed "Z Brigade" were being assembled at Kargil under the command of Lieutenant Colonel Kripal Singh. In response, Major Ehsan split his forces, sending a contingent to Parkutta to intercept the new reinforcements.

== Prelude ==
During the Siege of Skardu, Colonel Sher Jung Thapa and his Jammu and Kashmir state forces successfully held off the Gilgit Scouts, which were a paramilitary force within the Gilgit-Baltistan region in northern Pakistan and Pakistan-administered Kashmir. After repeated requests for reinforcement from Colonel Thapa, Indian headquarters in Srinagar dispatched another relief column, codenamed "Biscuit column," led by Brigadier Faqir Singh of the Jammu and Kashmir state forces. (Note: The Jammu and Kashmir force is also referred as state troops or forces)

Major Ehsan Ali, commander of the Gilgit Scouts, had initially planned to ambush an earlier relief column arriving on February 13 but failed to do so. Upon learning of the new column, he prepared another ambush targeting Brigadier Faqir Singh's forces. According to Mahajan, fighting intensified in the Skardu sector, including a failed attempt by the Skardu garrison to capture Point 8853 from the Scouts.

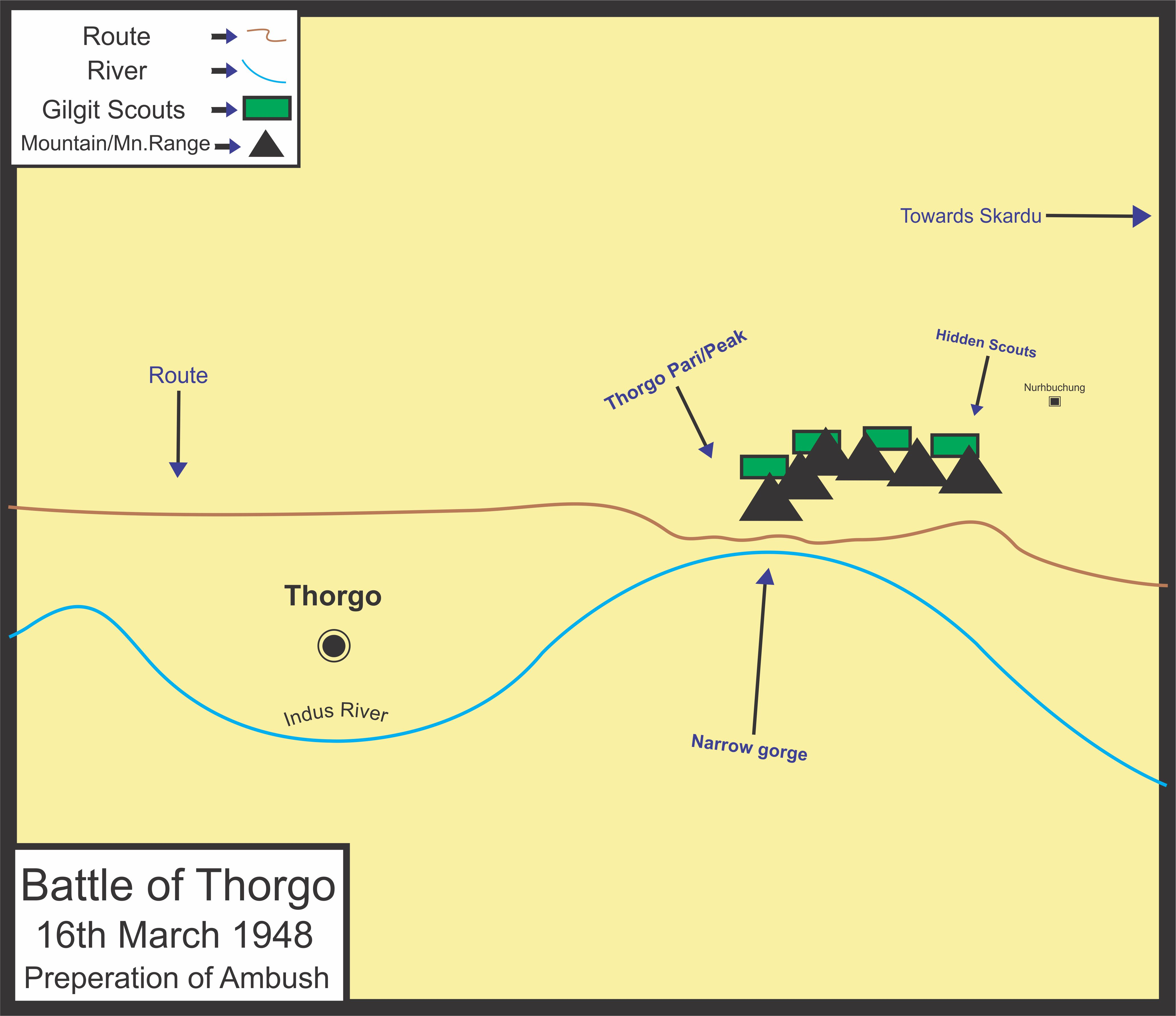
Map illustrating Preparation of Gilgit scouts for ambush

On 15 February, the Skardu garrison spotted a small Gilgit Scout force moving toward the expected relief column route. The next day, a larger force was seen advancing in the same direction.

Colonel Thapa, informed by headquarters at Srinagar that reinforcements would arrive on February 18, recognized these movements as ambush preparations. However, a malfunctioning W/T communication set prevented him from warning the relief forces. Colonel Thapa notified headquarters at Srinagar and requested airstrikes against the Scouts, but the Indians conducted no strikes.

Meanwhile, the arrival of the relief column greatly concerned Major Ehsan. Orders were given to Brigadier Faqir Singh to secure Thorgo Pari and keep the Indus River path open. As Brigadier Faqir's column approached Parkutta and Gol, he believed that the severe cold would incapacitate the Scouts. However, the Gilgit Scouts split their forces, leaving a smaller contingent at Skardu to continue shelling the garrison, while the majority of troops under Major Ehsan Ali prepared to ambush the relief column.

== Battle ==
=== Ambush and casualties ===
The Gilgit Scouts chose Thorgo Pari near Gol as the site for their ambush. At that location, the road narrowed along the Indus River's left bank, allowing only single-file passage. Captain Nek Alam and his platoon took positions on the northernmost part of Thorgo Hill. Subedar Muhammad Ali (Note: Subedar is a military rank which is classed as a junior commissioned officer rank in India and Pakistan.) and Lieutenant Babar spread their two platoons opposite Nurhbuchung village near the river. Captain Mohammed Khan positioned a mortar and machine gun section at the other end of the Pari, while another machine gun section was stationed at the edge. With these placements, the Scouts were prepared to ambush the Indian relief column.

On 17 February, Brigadier Singh and Major Coutts's forces advanced through the narrow pass under the cover of darkness. To the surprise of the Scouts, the column unexpectedly stopped near the ambush site for lunch before resuming their advance. As they entered firing range, the Scouts launched their ambush with combined arms fire and rolling rocks. Despite attempts to regroup, 3-inch and 2-inch mortar bombs caused heavy casualties, including wounding Brigadier Singh in the face and shoulder.

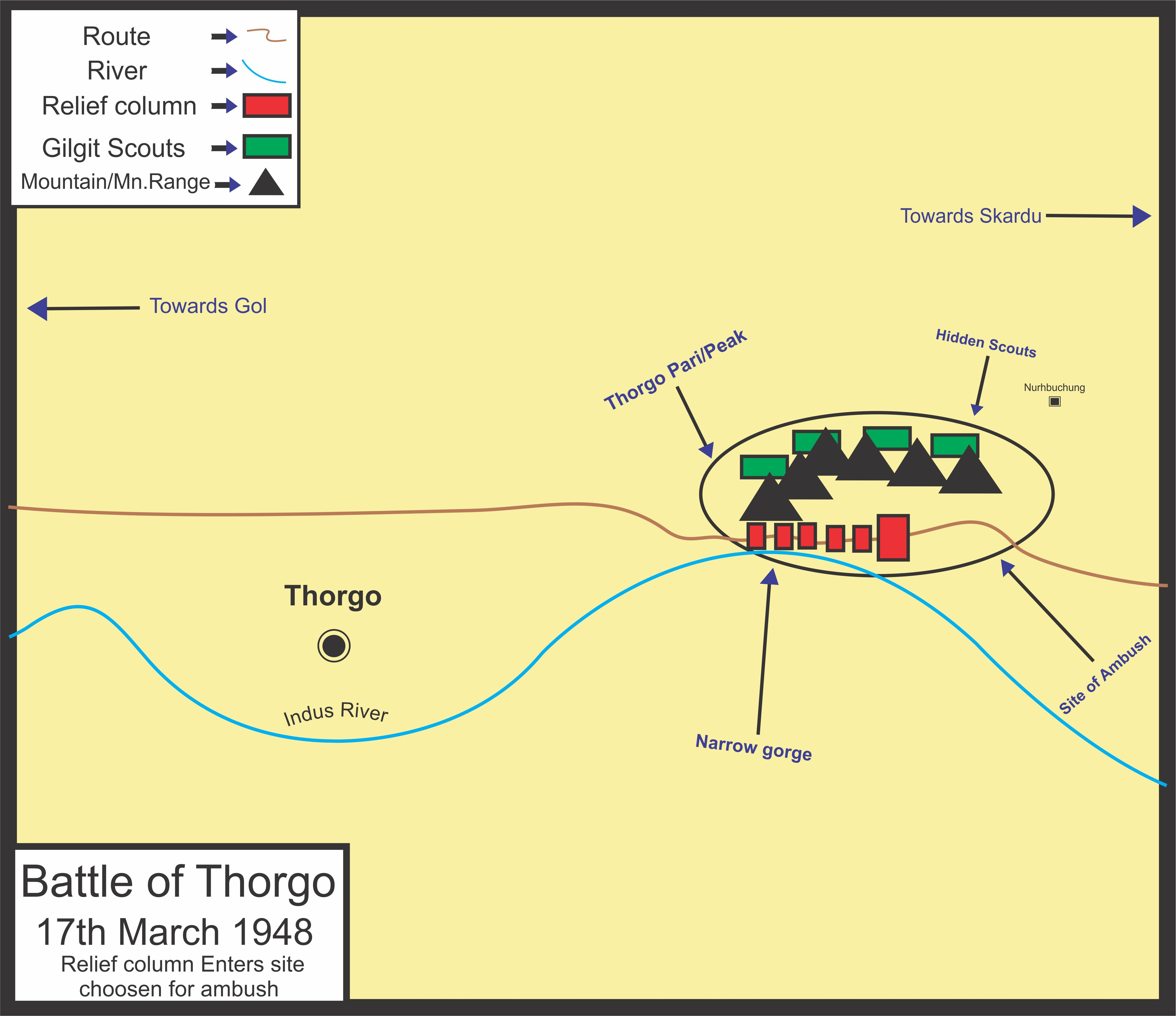
Map Illustrating Jammu and Kashmir state troops entering the site planned for ambush by Gilgit scouts

Despite the attack, the relief column returned fire and managed to hold their positions, preventing further Scout advances until dusk, though they were forced to leave behind their dead. The bombardment continued with mortar fire and constant shooting, aimed at preventing any regrouping of troops near Brigadier Faqir Singh. Defeated, the remaining forces retreated towards Kargil, spending the night at Totli on 18 March, and the column finally reached Kargil on 21 March. Brigadier Faqir Singh handed over command to Indian military advisor Major Coutts before returning to Srinagar for medical treatment.

The ambush of the relief column caused significant confusion and resulted in heavy casualties. Some troops attempted to escape by diving into the water, and abandoning their supplies, which included three mortars, light machine guns, rifles, a Bren gun, a Sten gun, grenades, .303 rounds, and 20 wireless sets, according to Ahmad Hasan Dani. Muhammad Yusuf Saraf reported that the Scouts captured 75,000 rounds of .303 ammunition, along with two or three mortars, medium machine guns, rifles, Sten guns, and various civilian supplies. Out of 350 men, 150 were reported dead on the spot, with only 75 believed to have survived.

S.N. Prasad provided a different account, stating that the relief column suffered 18 injuries, 26 deaths, and seven missing persons presumed dead. The Scouts captured 27 rifles, five Sten guns, two Vickers Berthier machine guns, 64,000 rounds of rifle ammunition, 84 hand grenades, 51 high-explosive bombs for the 2-inch mortar, and 204 HE bombs for the 3-inch mortar. According to a Government of India publication, Indian casualties included 26 killed, seven missing and presumed dead, and 18 wounded, with their ammunition and baggage looted.

On 18 March, Colonel Thapa assembled a small force of two weakened platoons and set out to join Brigadier Faqir Singh, as directed by headquarters at Srinagar. However, Thapa's group was ambushed by Gilgit scouts. Nonetheless, they managed to escape the ambush without any casualties. After advancing a short distance, Thapa's forces were informed by local villagers of the defeat of the relief column.

The fact that the column had had to turn back after reaching so close to Skardu was most tragic. The tragedy was all the more heightened after it became known that the Skardu Garrison had sent out two platoons under Lieutenant Ajit Singh (accompanied by Major Thapa himself) towards Gol to receive the relief column half way, but unfortunately this was done on 18 March which happened to be a day too late.

— k. Brahma Singh

== Aftermath ==
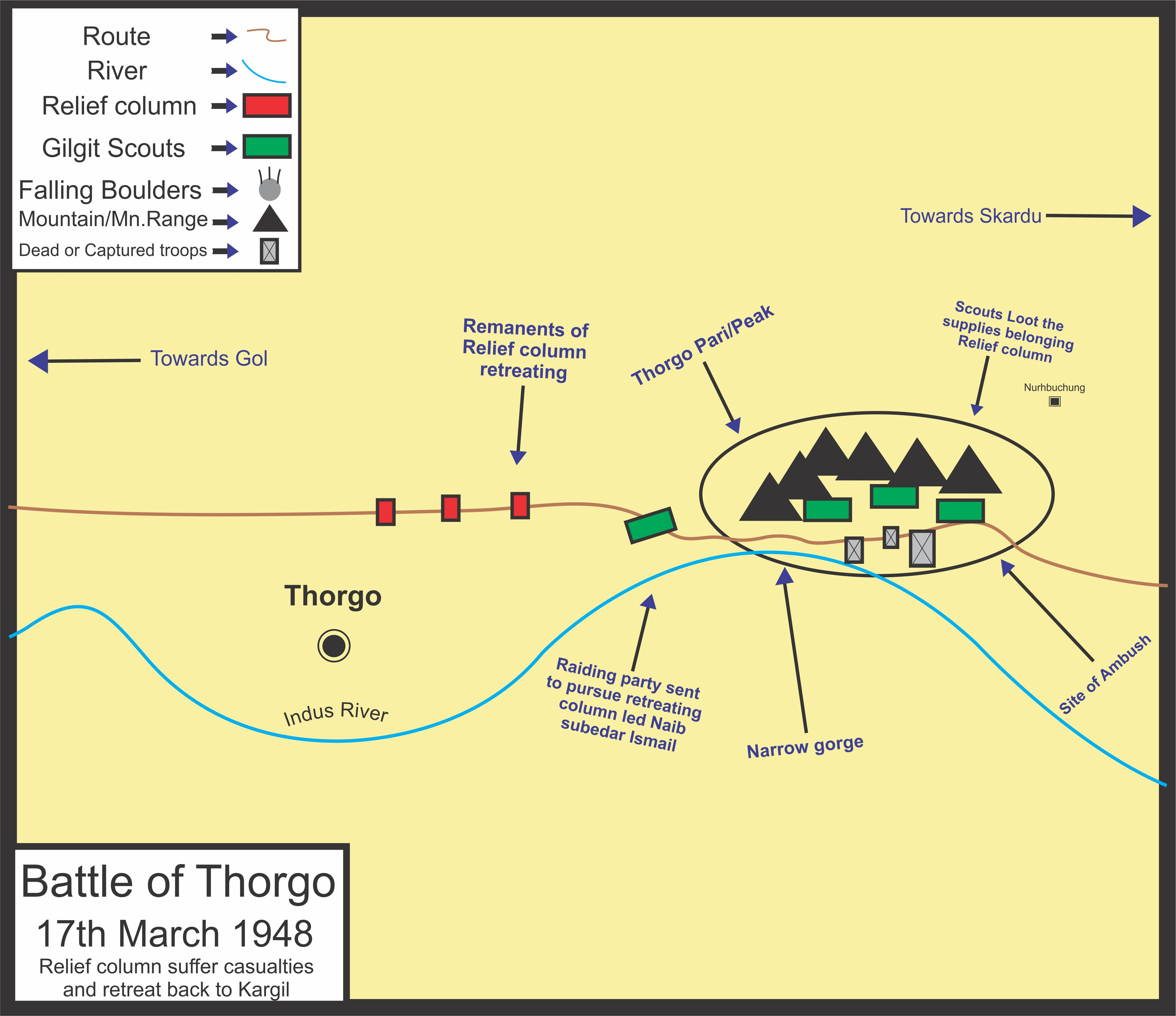
Map illustrating the successful ambush by the Gilgit Scouts on the relief forces and their retreat.

After the defeat of the relief column and the success of the Gilgit Scouts near Gol, the fleeing Indian troops were pursued by Jamadar Ismail Khan (Note: Jemadar is a title used for various military and other officials in the Indian subcontinent mostly for lower ranks.) and the Gilgit Scouts. The Pakistanis, including Scouts, also increased pressure on the Skardu garrison. As the retreating forces made their way to Kargil, they were attacked by both the Scouts and local Muslims, resulting in further casualties. The Gilgit Scouts, anticipating that reinforcements for relief of the garrison again might be sent from Srinagar, intensified their efforts to capture Skardu swiftly before such reinforcements could arrive.

Following the engagement, Major Ehsan strengthened his position by recruiting local youths and arming them with supplies captured from the relief force. With this increased strength, Pakistani attacks on the Skardu garrison intensified, as did their shelling of the cantonment. On March 26, the Scouts launched a night attack on the Skardu garrison, resulting in heavy crossfire. The outcome of the attack was inconclusive. When Major Ehsan learned that further reinforcements, designated as Z Brigade and commanded by Lieutenant Colonel Kripal Singh, were being dispatched to consolidate at Kargil, he decided to split his forces and send a contingent to Parkutta to counter this new threat.

Meantime, A and B Companies of the 7th Jammu and Kashmir Rifles, led by Captains Davinder Singh and Durga Singh, were ordered to reinforce the Skardu garrison. They joined Major Coutts and other members of the previous column at Kargil, advancing towards Parkutta to await further reinforcements from the 5th Jammu and Kashmir Rifles. Lieutenant Babar Khan was left in charge of the Skardu siege while Major Ehsan departed for Parkutta on April 29. After Ehsan's departure, Babar Khan moved towards Ladakh, and the siege at Skardu continued under Colonel Mataul of Chitral. The Royal Indian Air Force also began providing support to the besieged forces at Skardu.

== See also ==
- Indo-Pakistani war of 1947–1948
- Kashmir conflict
- Siege of Skardu
- Gilgit-Baltistan
- 1947 Gilgit rebellion
- Operations in Ladakh

== Sources ==
=== Works cited ===
- Saraf, Muhammad Yusuf (2015) [first published 1979 by Ferozsons], Kashmiris Fight for Freedom, Volume 2, Mirpur: National Institute Kashmir Studies, archived from the original on 29 March 2021
- Gulati, M. N. (2000). Military Plight of Pakistan: Indo-Pak War, 1947-48, Volume 1. Vol. 1. Manas Publications. ISBN 9788170491231. Archived from the original on 18 January 2017.
- Jaffri, Imran Haider (Summer 2019). "Captain Hussain Khan, Fakhr-i-Kashmir, OBI, shaheed: A Forgotten Hero of Kashmir Liberation War-1947/48". Bugle and Trumpet. 1 (2). Army Institute of Military History, Pakistan. Archived from the original on 25 February 2024 – via Aimh.
- Palit, D. K. (1972). Jammu and Kashmir Arms: History of the J & K Rifles. Palit & Dutt. ASIN B0006C8HKM. Archived from the original on 20 January 2000.
- Dani, Ahmad Hasan (1989). History of Northern Areas of Pakistan. National Institute of Historical and Cultural Research. ISBN 9789694150161. Archived from the original on 15 December 2022.
- Prasad, S.N (1987). History of Operations in Jammu & Kashmir, 1947-48. History Division, Ministry of Defence, Government of India. Archived from the original on 15 January 2017.
- Ministry of Information and Broadcasting, India (1949). Defending Kashmir. Publications Division, Ministry of Information and Broadcasting, Government of India. Archived from the original on 26 October 2014.
- Suharwardy, Abdul Haq (1983), Tragedy in Kashmir, Wajidalis
- Singh, K.Brahma (1990). History of Jammu and Kashmir Rifles, 1820-1956 The State Force Background (Hardcover). Lancer International. ISBN 9788170620914.
  - Singh, K. Brahma (2010) [first published Lancer International 1990], History of Jammu and Kashmir Rifles, 1820-1956: The State Force Background (PDF), brahmasingh.co.nf, ISBN 978-81-7062-091-4, archived from the original (PDF) on 6 March 2016
