= Action at Tsari =

Battle during First Kashmir war

- Part of Kashmir conflict and the Indo-Pakistani war of 1947–1948
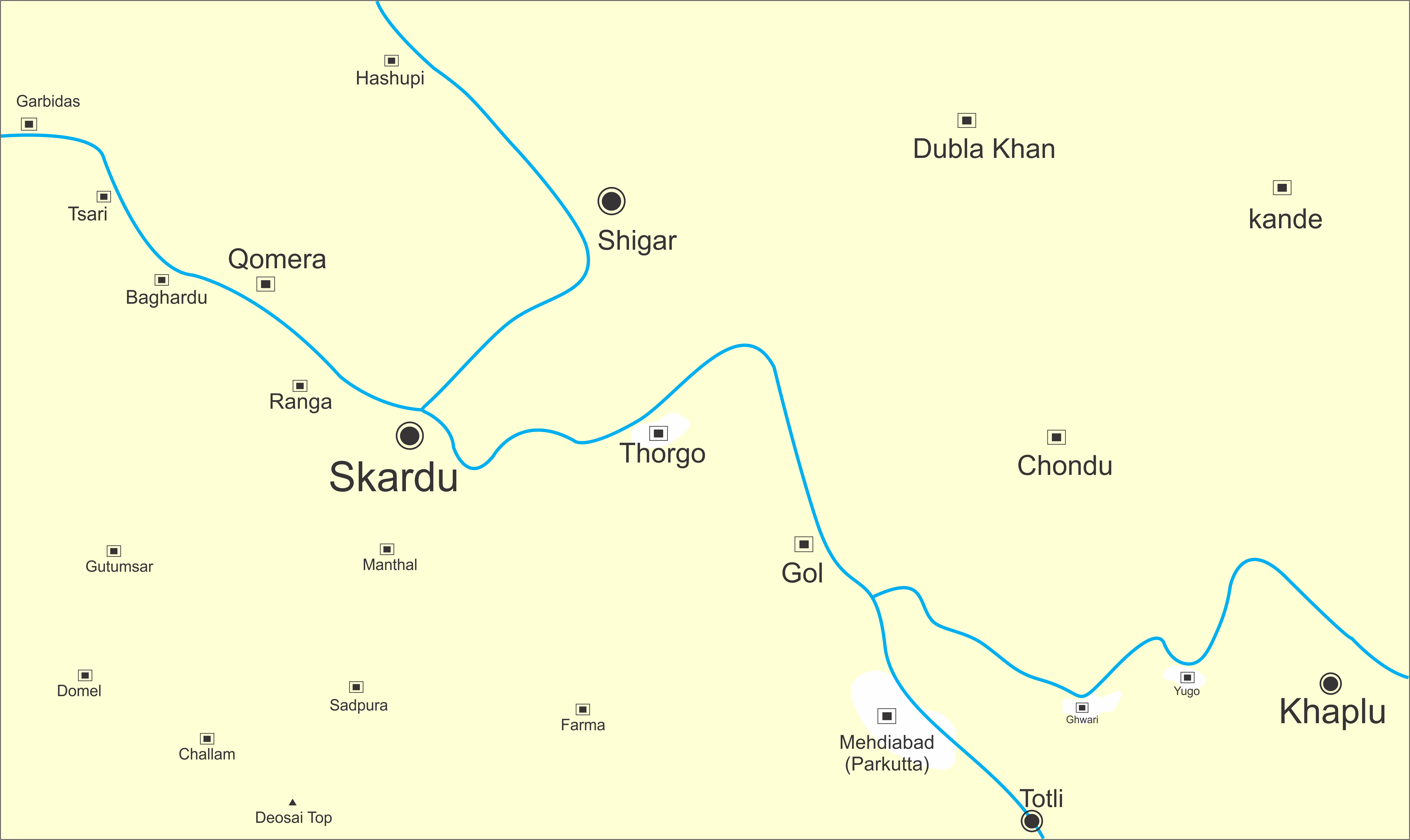
Date	8–12 February 1948 (Note: The dates of the Assault on Tsari and the action differ according to various accounts suggesting different Days: "The attack was planned on the night of 11–12 February 1948."; "A platoon was left behind to tackle the enemy and Tsari, which was attacked on 9 February 1948 once it was detected."; "On the night of 8–9 February, our outposts at Tsari were attacked.")
Location	Tsari (Note: Tsari is situated 20 miles North west of Skardu.) near Skardu, Pakistan 35.4699°N 75.41393°E
Result	Pakistani victory: Outposts at Tsari eliminated; All State troops eliminated

Belligerents
Dominion of Pakistan	Dominion of India: Jammu and Kashmir

Commanders and leaders
Maj. Ehsan Ali; Liet. Babar; Capt. Khan Jarral	Capt. Krishan †; Capt. Nek Alam (Later defected)

Units involved
Gilgit Scouts: Ibex Force; A wing; D Wing; Muslim Deserters	State forces: 6 J&K Infantry

Strength
Initial strength: ~2 platoons, (250 men); After defection: ~3 platoons	Initial strength: ~2 platoons After defection: ~1 platoon

Casualties and losses
Unknown	All killed

The Action at Tsari (also spelled Saari) occurred during the Indo-Pakistani war of 1947–1948 in the Gilgit-Baltistan sector at Tsari, on the banks of the Indus River near Skardu, from 11 to 12 February 1948. The conflict involved the Gilgit Scouts and the Jammu and Kashmir forces. The Ibex Force of the Gilgit Scouts, led by Major Ehsan, planned an attack on the Tsari outposts along the Indus River. These outposts had been established by Colonel Sher Jung Thapa as a defensive measure and to warn the Skardu garrison in case of an assault. Upon the arrival of the Gilgit Scouts, the Muslim troops stationed at the state forces' outpost, including their commander, Captain Nek Alam, defected to the Gilgit Scouts.

The platoon under Captain Krishan Singh exchanged fire with the "D" wing of the Gilgit Scouts after being spotted during the assault. Captain Singh then withdrew his troops to a nearby cave that overlooked their previous position. A Muslim soldier within the Gilgit Scouts spread rumors of a large-scale assault by the state forces, causing the entire Gilgit force to withdraw, except for Bakhtawar Shah, who discovered the state forces' platoon hiding in the cave and forced them to surrender.

After learning that they were not surrounded by a large force, Captain Singh and his platoon attempted to escape. This led to a face-to-face confrontation in which all the state troops, including Captain Singh, were killed. Since runners were the only means of communication between Skardu and Tsari, none of the state troops returned to Skardu to report the attack, leaving Colonel Thapa and his forces unaware of the arrival of the Gilgit Scouts. Assistance from the Raja of Rondu, combined with details provided by the Muslim soldiers, led to the capture of Rondu. The Gilgit Scouts then planned to secure all of Skardu, launching an assault on 11 February, with reinforcements from Tsari joining them on 12 February.

== Background ==
Historically, Skardu was divided into tehsils, each governed by a local jagirdar known as a Raja. The route through the Gilgit-Bunji area to Rondu was of particular concern to state forces, as it posed a significant threat compared to the other three directions, which were protected by the surrounding mountains and ranges.

During the First Kashmir War, the Commander of the 6th Jammu and Kashmir Infantry, Colonel Majid Khan, was arrested during the coup staged by the Gilgit Scouts against the Gilgit Governor. Following this, Sher Jung Thapa was promoted to the rank of Lieutenant Colonel and ordered to move to Skardu from Leh on 21 November. Colonel Thapa departed for Skardu on 23 November with two Sikh platoons. They arrived in Skardu on 2 December, increasing the number of platoons to four, including the two already stationed under Captain Nek Alam. Their mission was to prepare for the impending arrival of the Gilgit Scouts, secure Skardu, and obtain relief columns. The Gilgit Scouts only advanced to Skardu in February–March, after addressing unrest caused by the Shia community.

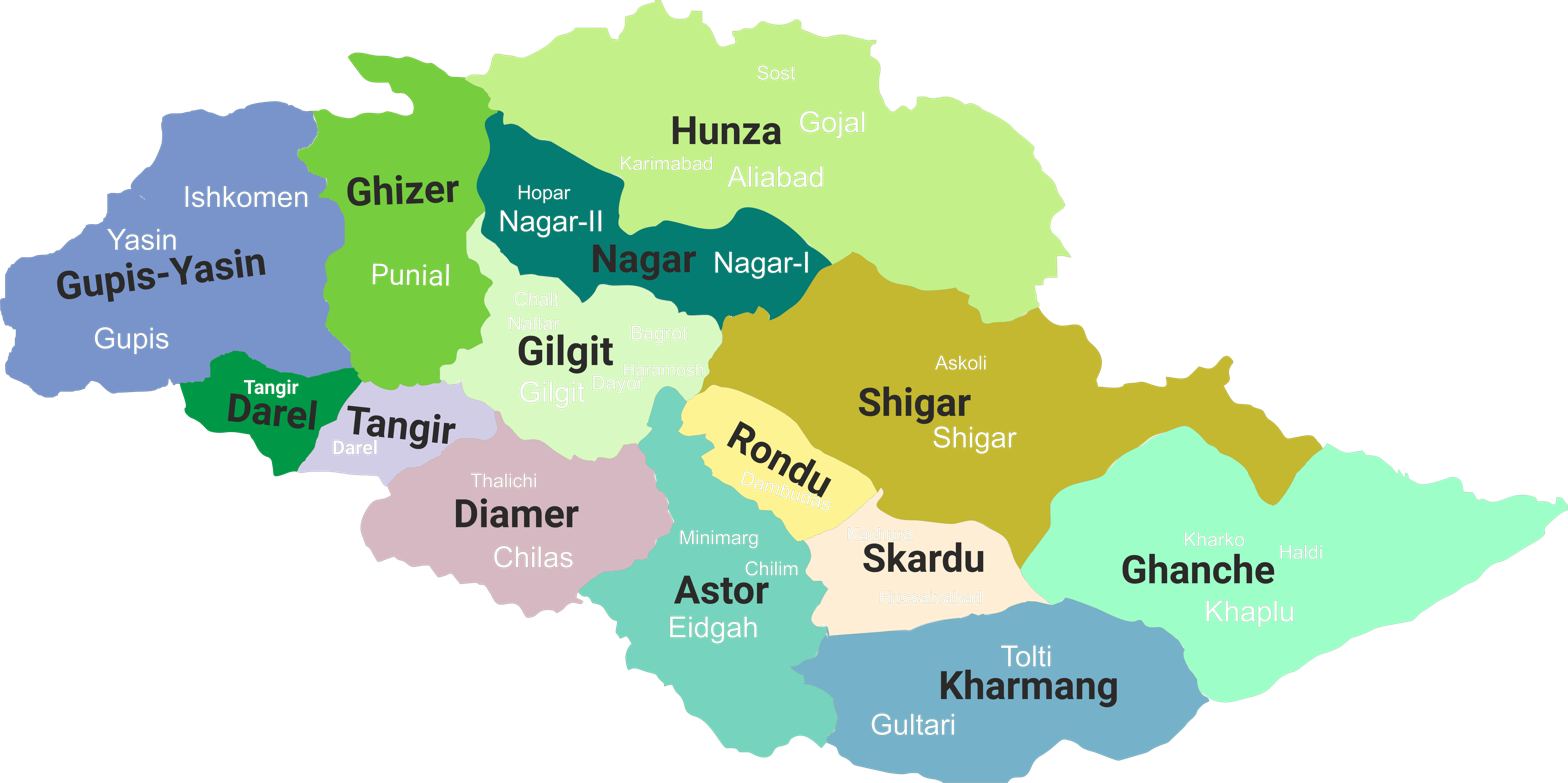
Rondu District on the map of modern-day Gilgit-Baltistan

The Muslim Captain Nek Alam received letters from Captain Hassan Khan, delivered by two men from the Astore region. In these letters, Captain Hassan urged Captain Nek Alam to take up arms against the state forces. Captain Nek reported this to the local authorities, leading Colonel Thapa to establish outposts at Tsari Pass in the Rondu region to warn the forces stationed at Skardu of a potential attack. Meanwhile, the Ibex column, led by Major Ehsan, gathered in the village of Harmosh after advancing from Bunji to Skardu.

The Muslim troops within the Jammu and Kashmir sector defected from the state forces, where they had been serving as guides. One Muslim soldier reached Istak by floating on a swollen cow's skin and informed Major Ehsan that the Muslims on the right bank were secure, while state forces were massacring those on the left bank. Three hundred civilians, willingly mobilized by the Raja of Rondu, were stationed on both sides of the Indus River at Wasola and Harkoya. This resulted in Rondu being freed from state troops, except in Bagicha, Garbidas, and Tongudas. Meanwhile, the people of Skardu refused to cooperate with the state administration, awaiting the arrival of the Gilgit Scouts. Captain Hassan Khan assured the Raja of Rondu that relief forces would arrive soon.

== Action ==
The Ibex Force consisted of two wings: the "A" Wing, composed of 100 men led by Captain Muhammad Jarral, and the "D" Wing, consisting of 150 men led by Lieutenant Babar Khan. Major Ehsan was in overall command of the troops. After assembling at Harmush on 29 February, the "D" Wing followed the "A" Wing, which continued to advance. The Raja of Rondu remained in contact through the newly appointed political agent of Gilgit-Baltistan, Wazir Wilayat Ali.

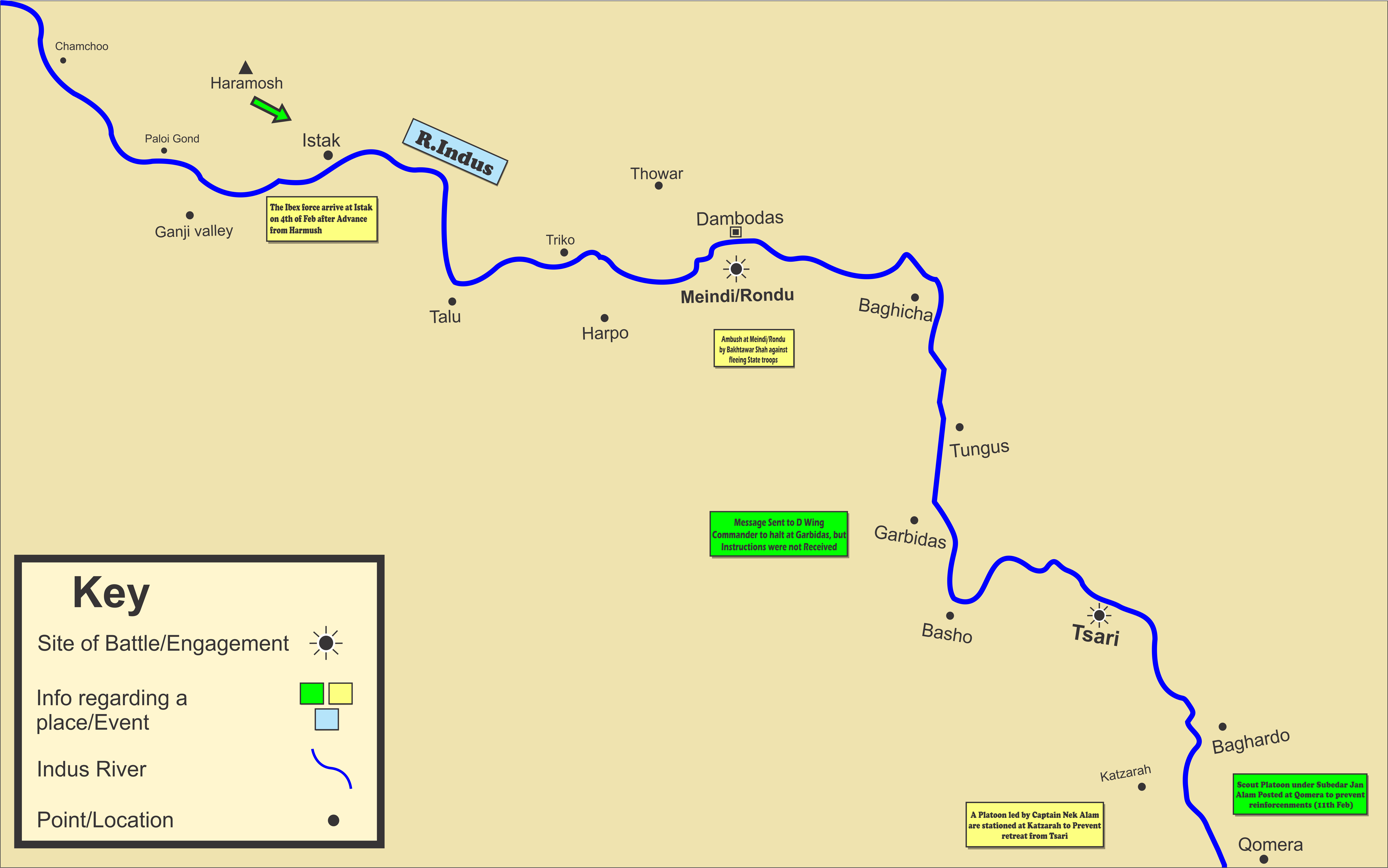
Map describing the events in the Skardu/Rondu region in 1948

Upon learning of the Ibex Force's arrival, Colonel Thapa dispatched Captain Ganga Singh with two sections of troops toward Rondu, reaching Istak on 4 February. However, the Muslim members of the force monitoring the situation foiled the plan. An exchange of fire ensued, convincing Captain Ganga Singh to retreat to Skardu. Captain Nek Alam joined the Ibex Force and informed Major Ehsan of the state forces' situation. The Gilgit Scouts planned to launch an assault on Tsari, according to Author Hassan Dani the assault on Tsari was planned on the night of 11–12 February, while a platoon was sent to Qomera to intercept relief forces from Skardu. Meanwhile, according to Mahajan the assault was launched on 8–9 February.

Another platoon under Captain Nek Alam was stationed at Katzarah to prevent reinforcements from that direction. Simultaneously, a platoon from the "A" Wing of the Ibex Force arrived on the opposite side of the river to block the state troops' retreat The assault was initiated prematurely due to an error: Lieutenant Babar was supposed to receive orders to halt at Garbidas, but the orders never reached him. Consequently, the state forces spotted the column, and the "D" Wing launched its assault on Tsari. Shelling ensued between the "D" Wing and the state troops. Major Ehsan then departed for Skardu, leaving a segment of troops above Tsari village to prevent the state forces from retreating toward Skardu.

Captain Krishan Singh and his troops quietly relocated to a rocky den. A Muslim soldier loyal to the state forces spread false reports among the Gilgit Scouts, claiming that a large-scale attack by the state forces was imminent. This caused unrest, prompting the Scouts' commander to retreat to a safer position. However, Bakhtawar Shah, suspecting the rumor was a ruse by Krishan Singh to escape, was unconvinced. Shah traced the state troops to their new position by following their footprints, ultimately leading to the surrender of Captain Krishan Singh and his men after they were surrounded.

== Aftermath ==
Captain Krishan Singh and his troops observed that the Gilgit Scouts were fewer in number than expected. They attempted to escape, which led to face-to-face combat in which all of the state troops, including Captain Krishan Singh, were killed. The commander of the "A" Wing awarded Bakhtawar Shah a merit certificate for his role in the operation. With the fall of Rondu to the Gilgit Scouts, the Muslim soldiers of the Skardu Garrison attempted to free themselves from the control of the state administration. The assistance provided to the Ibex Force contributed to the capture of all of Rondu, including Tsari.

Communication between Skardu and Tsari was limited to runners, and none of the state troops returned to Skardu to report the attack. Colonel Thapa and the state forces had their last contact on 9 February. Unaware of the situation at Tsari or the arrival of the Gilgit Scouts, the state forces were left vulnerable due to the lack of warnings from outposts.

After the assault at Tsari, the Ibex Force advanced toward Skardu. On 12 February, the force regrouped at Qomera under Major Ehsan and was divided into two units. Major Ehsan's plan involved the main column advancing along the right bank of the river, while Captain Nek Alam and Lieutenant Babar established a foothold for the main column to cross. Havildar Sher Muhammad was tasked with gathering all available boats at an accessible location in Skardu and rallying the local Muslim population at Sondus before the assault.

Meanwhile, a relief column led by Captain Prabhat Singh, Lieutenant Ajit Singh, and Bhagat Singh had departed from Srinagar on 13 January 1948. They arrived in Skardu on 10 February, having faced numerous challenges due to the harsh winter. The relief column initially returned to Srinagar midway, warned by locals of the dangers of the journey. However, after receiving further instructions, they resumed their journey and reached Skardu. The assault on Skardu town was launched on 11 February and the Siege of Skardu began on 12th.

These disparate elements were stiffened and officered by the regulars from Pak Army It speaks volumes for the organizing ability and leadership of these Pak Army officers who wielded together such a heterogeneous group of highly temperamental people into an effective and efficient fighting outfit, making sure that their potential as guerrilla fighters adept at hit and run tactics was retained in its entirety and fully exploited.

— M.N. Gulati, Military Plight Of Pakistan Vol I, p. 66

== See also ==
- 1947 Gilgit rebellion
- Siege of Skardu
- Battle of Thorgo
- Gilgit Scouts
- Gilgit-Baltistan
- Jammu and Kashmir (state)

== Sources ==
=== Works cited ===
- Dani, Ahmad Hasan (1989). History of Northern Areas of Pakistan. National Institute of Historical and Cultural Research. ISBN 9789694150161. Archived from the original on 4 August 2024.
- Mahajan, Skumar (1973). Debacle in Baltistan. sole distributors] A. K. Corporation, New Delhi. Archived from the original on 20 January 2021.
- Cheema, Amar (2014). The Crimson Chinar the Kashmir Conflict : a Politico Military Perspective. United Service Institution of India. ISBN 9788170623014.
- S. Bloeria, Dr. Sudhir (2021). Battlefield Zojila - 1948. VIJ Books (India) PVT Limited. ISBN 9789388161145.
- Jaffri, Imran Haider (Summer 2019). "BAKHTAWAR SHAH – A LEGENDRY CHARACTER OF GILGIT-BALTISTAN LIBERATION WAR". Bugle and Trumpet. I. Army Institute of Military History, Pakistan. Archived from the original on 27 July 2024 – via aimh.gov.pk.
- Palit, D. K. (1972). Jammu and Kashmir Arms: History of the J & K Rifles. Palit & Dutt. ASIN B0006C8HKM. Archived from the original on 20 January 2000.
- Gulati, M. N. (2000). Military Plight of Pakistan: Indo-Pak War, 1947-48, Volume 1. Vol. 1. Manas Publications. ISBN 9788170491231. Archived from the original on 18 January 2017.
- Saraf, Muhammad Yusuf (2015) [first published 1979 by Ferozsons], Kashmiris Fight for Freedom, Volume 2, Mirpur: National Institute Kashmir Studies, archived from the original on 30 July 2024
- Prasad, S.N (1987). History of Operations in Jammu & Kashmir, 1947-48. History Division, Ministry of Defence, Government of India. Archived from the original on 4 August 2024.
- Suharwardy, Abdul Haq (1983), Tragedy in Kashmir, Wajidalis
- Singh, K.Brahma (1990). History of Jammu and Kashmir Rifles, 1820-1956 The State Force Background (Hardcover). Lancer International. ISBN 9788170620914.
  - Singh, K. Brahma (2010) [first published Lancer International 1990], History of Jammu and Kashmir Rifles, 1820-1956: The State Force Background (PDF), brahmasingh.co.nf, ISBN 978-81-7062-091-4, archived from the original (PDF) on 6 March 2016

Preceded by Meindi Ambush	Battles of the Indo-Pakistani war of 1947; Action at Tsari	Succeeded by Siege of Skardu
