= Siege of Skardu =

Siege during the First Kashmir War of 1947

- Part of the Indo-Pakistani War of 1947
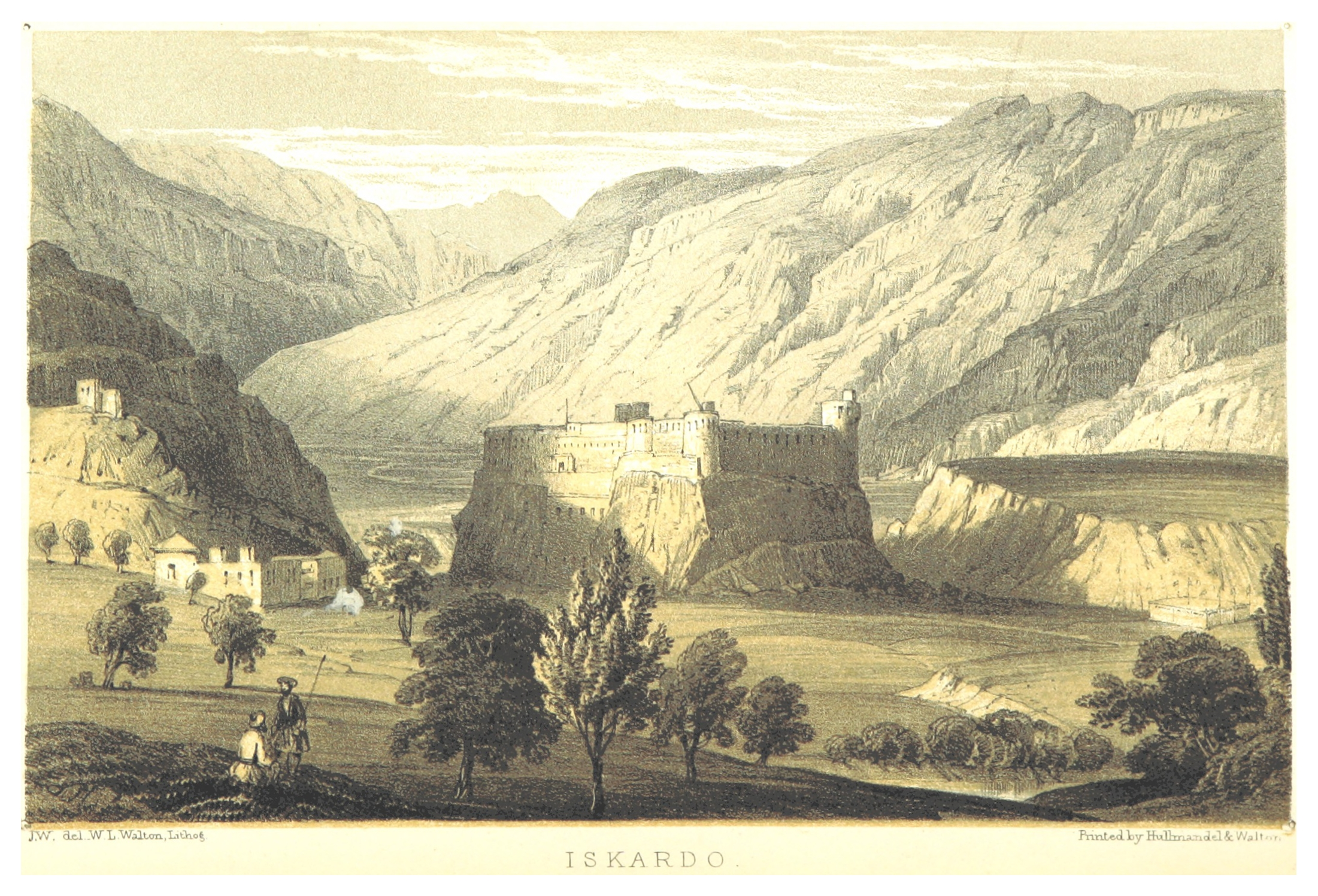
- A painting of Skardu Fort
| Date | 11 February 1948 – 14 August 1948 (6 months and 3 days) |
| Location | Skardu, Jammu and Kashmir |
| Result | Pakistani victory |
| Territorial changes | Skardu becomes part of Pakistan-administered Kashmir |

Belligerents
| Dominion of India: Jammu and Kashmir; Indian Air Force | Dominion of Pakistan: Chitral; Pakistan Air Force |

Commanders and leaders
| Col. Sher Jung Thapa (surrendered); Capt. Ganga Singh (surrendered); Capt. Parhdal Singh (surrendered); Lt. Ajit Singh (surrendered) | Maj. Ehsan Ali Khan; Col. Burhan-ud-Din; Col. Mata-ul-Mulk; Lt. Babar Khan |

Units involved
| Jammu and Kashmir State Forces; Indian Air Force | Ibex Force; Chitral Scouts; Chitral State Bodyguards |

Strength
| 285 | ~ 400 (Ibex Force, February – April 1948) ~ 300 (Chitral Forces, June – August 1948) |

Casualties and losses
| 250 captured | Unknown |

The siege of Skardu was a prolonged military blockade carried out by the pro-Pakistani forces of Ibex Force, Chitral Scouts and Chitral State Bodyguards, against the Jammu and Kashmir State Forces and the Indian Army in the town of Skardu, during the First Kashmir War of 1947–48. The victory of pro-Pakistani forces resulted in Skardu becoming part of modern-day Gilgit-Baltistan.

== Background ==
Gilgit Scouts, the British-officered force of the princely state of Jammu and Kashmir stationed in Gilgit for frontier defence, launched Operation Datta Khel on 31 October 1947 after hearing the news of Jammu and Kashmir's accession to India. They were joined by rebels from the 6th battalion of the Jammu and Kashmir State Forces stationed at Bunji, annihilated the rest of the battalion and imprisoned its commander Col. Abdul Majid. The combined forces of the Gilgit Scouts and rebels were placed under the command of Lt. Col. Aslam Khan by the Azad Kashmir provisional government. (Note: Lt. Col. Aslam Khan was a decorated officer of the Jammu and Kashmir State Forces, who moved to the British Indian Army and later Pakistan Army. Officially on leave from the Pakistan Army, he described himself as a "deserter" and joined the service of the Azad Kashmir provisioinal government, .) Aslam Khan divided the troops into three forces of 400 men each, and deployed one of them, the "Ibex Force" under Major Ehsan Ali Khan, to take Skardu.

Skardu, the political centre of Baltistan, was the headquarters of a tehsil of the Ladakh Wazarat. The administration of the wazarat was stationed at Skardu for six months in each year and at Leh for the other six months. At the time of the rebellion, a company of the 6th battalion of Jammu and Kashmir State Forces under the command of a Gurkha officer, Major Sher Jung Thapa was at Leh.

== Siege of Skardu ==
When the news of the Gilgit rebellion was received, Sher Jung Thapa was promoted to Lieut. Colonel and made commander of the remainder of the 6th battalion. He was asked to proceed to Skardu for its defence. On reaching Skardu on 3 December, he realised that his position was untenable and sought permission to withdraw the garrison and the civil administration to Kargil and also requested reinforcements. The request for withdrawal was turned down and he was reportedly asked "to hold to last man and last round". The Indian forces, along with the non-Muslim civil population of Skardu, withdrew into the Skardu Fort. On 1 February, 1948 the leading column of the Ibex force left Harmosh, 25 miles east of Gilgit and reached Tsari on 9 February where it quickly overpowered the two Indian platoons left by Col. Thapa. Skardu was besieged on 11 February.

Meanwhile in Srinagar, under the control of the Indian Army, a Skardu relief column consisting of two companies was assembled, which crossed Zoji La Pass and reached Skardu on 10 February. On 11 February, the Ibex Force battled with the Indian garrison. After a six-hour-long battle between the two, the besiegers retreated. They came again on 14 February directing "harassing fire into the fort". Royal Pakistan Air Force Halifaxes and C-47 Dakotas flew several sorties to conduct nighttime Airdrop missions in support of Ibex forces.

In mid-March a second Indian relief column consisting of 350 men and 600 coolies under the command of Brig. Faqir Singh was ambushed and destroyed at Thorgo by Ibex Force, 10 miles away from Skardu. Renewed attacks were carried on the besieged garrison on March 24 and half of the Indian positions were captured. A third Indian relief column consisting of two battalions under the command of Lt. Col. Sampuran Singh and Lt. Col. Kirpal Singh was sent in April and ambushed at Parkutta by the Ibex Force on 20 April, which developed into a full scale battle by the mid-May. As a result the siege of Skardu was lifted and the responsibility of blockade was handed over to the local volunteers as the rest of force was sent to Parkutta. On 29 April Major Ehsan Ali left Skardu, giving the charge to Lt. Babar Khan.

In June the prince of Chitral Mata-ul-Mulk arrived in Skardu with his brother Burhan-ud-Din and a contingent of Chitral bodyguards. He took charge after Babar Khan was sent to Ladakh on 12 June. His arrival was instrumental in turning the tide of war as he brought with him four pieces of light artillery. On 17 June Mata-ul-Mulk communicated with Thapa through a captured Indian POW:

You have done your duty as every soldier should do ... I therefore advise you to lay down arms and I take full responsibility to give protection to one and all. You must trust me and believe me as I am not only a soldier but also possess royal blood ... as a proof of my goodwill I wish to inform you that not a single Sikh or Hindu resident of Chitral has been hurt and not a single non-Muslim property looted or damaged and up till now they carry on their business as if nothing at all has happened. I therefore advise you again to lay down arms and thus save your lives. An Officer should accompany back the white flag if you consider my words sincere and honest.

Thapa however treated the prince's message with contempt and refused. From 19 June till the end the Indian garrison had the continuous support of the Royal Indian Air Force. By mid-August 1948, the Indian garrison was in beggarly shape and the Kashmir forces began to leave the fort in small batches on 13 August 1948. On 14 August 1948 and with the last box of the reserve ammunition used, the garrison capitulated to col. Mata-ul-Mulk. All the remaining men were reportedly killed, except for Col. Thapa and his Sikh orderly. Col. Thapa, who had earned his respect from Mata-ul-Mulk due to his last stand, was released a few weeks later, and was awarded Maha Vir Chakra by the Indian government.

== See also ==
- Kashmir conflict
  - 1947 Gilgit rebellion
  - 1948 military operations in Ladakh

== Sources ==
- Saraf, M. Yusuf (2015) [1979]. "XXVII. Liberation of Gilgit". Kashmiris Fight For Freedom (1819–1946). Vol. II. Lahore: Ferozsons. pp. 279–286. OCLC 917824524.
- Dani, Ahmad Hasan (1991) [1989]. "Struggle for Freedom (1947–1948)". History of Northern Areas of Pakistan (2nd ed.). Islamabad: National Institute of Historical and Cultural Research, Quaid-i-Azam University. pp. 380–390. ISBN 978-969-415-016-1.
