= A Short History of Pakistan =

- Author: Ishtiaq Hussain Qureshi General Editor
- Language: English
- Series: History of Pakistan series
- Subject: History of Pakistan
- Publisher: University of Karachi Press
- Publication date: 1967, 1984, 1992
- Publication place: Pakistan
- Pages: 934
- ISBN: 969-404-008-6
- OCLC: 19353565
- Dewey Decimal: 020/.92/4 B 19
- LC Class: Z720.K54 M35 1987

A Short History of Pakistan is an edited book published by University of Karachi Press and comprises four volumes. The book is edited by Prof Ishtiaq Hussain Qureshi and provides a comprehensive account of the history of the Pakistan region and its people from the prehistory leading to the creation of Pakistan and East Pakistan which then became Bangladesh. Complete set of four volumes are sequentially titled as, Book One: Pre-Muslim Period by Ahmad Hasan Dani; Book Two: Muslim Rule under the Sultans by M. Kabir; Book Three: The Mughul Empire by Sh. A. Rashid; and, Book Four: Alien Rule and the Rise of Muslim Nationalism by M. A. Rahim et al.

This book is significant as probably the first serious attempt to paint an overall picture of the early history of Pakistan region. Given that the book deals with periods of history prior to the creation of Pakistan, it has been described as, point of fact, a history of the northern part of the entire Indian subcontinent with special emphasis on the region that presently is Pakistan. Some of the essays have been criticised by peer reviewers as being insufficiently objective about relations between Indian Muslims, Hindus and the British political classes.

== Preamble ==
At the preface, I H Qureshi addresses the common question as to whether it is possible to disentangle the history of Pakistan from the history of India. He maintains that although for certain periods Pakistan shares common history with modern day India, there are periods of regional history with local significance that were actually dominated by the events outside the South Asia, especially in Central Asia and Iranian plateau. There have also been times when the region actually became arbiter of the South Asia's historical destiny.

== Critiques on four volumes ==
=== Book One: Pre-Muslim Period by A.H. Dani ===
Critique by Arthur Llewellyn Basham: Author of the first volume, Prof A. H. Dani is not only an expert archaeologist and prehistorian, but also an able Sanskrit scholar with a very important study of Indian palaeography to his credit. Its interest for the non-Pakistani reader lies chiefly in the attempt to find common factors in the ancient culture of what is now Pakistan. Although a great treasure of ancient Buddhist artefacts is discovered, no significant specimen of Mauryan Empire and Mauryan art is to be found in Pakistan. Gupta Empire also had little influence here. The book has been praised by Basham as "a work which no sensible Pakistani or Indian could object to or accuse of undue prejudice"

=== Book Two: Muslim Rule under the Sultans by M. Kabir ===
Critique by Philip B. Calkins: This volume gives a survey of the history of the Sultanate period. After an introductory chapter which describes some of the sources for the history of the period, nine chapters are devoted to an account of the Sultanate, its Muslim antecedents in Sindh and Afghanistan, and the independent Muslim kingdoms which developed out of it. The final chapter deals with administration, society and culture. Perhaps the most interesting aspect of this volume is historiographical rather than historical, since it is part of a series of Pakistan and Muslims since their arrival in the sub-continent. Calkins, calls for a more deeper analysis of the history than presented in this volume. Despite the apparent image of "the official Pakistani point of view" intended to be used as textbook for undergraduate students, the volume should have been able to offer more for those who desire more rudimentary knowledge of sultanate period. He praises the particular aspect of the book as "historigraphical rather than historical".

=== Book Three: The Mughal Empire by Sh. A. Rashid ===
Critique by Fritz Lehman: Given that this book is intended as a textbook for Pakistani undergraduates, Shaikh Ahmed Sarhindi predictably appears as the chief preserver of separate Islamic identity in India, yet only a very general and most inadequate description of his ideas and his influence is given. Chapters on Akbar and Aurangzib are the longest and the most revealing. The tone of the book in general is more reasonable and moderate than such earlier publications. Assessment of the Marathas, for example, while unsympathetic is fair to the facts.

Lehman criticises the volume's implications that Muslims living under "Hindu rule" was "the worst disaster in the history of Islam in South Asia", a view he describes as 'consistent with the Two-Nation Theory', but one that he finds "disquieting".

=== Book Four: Alien Rule and the Rise of Muslim Nationalism by M. A. Rahim et al. ===
Critique by Aziz Ahmed: Determination of national identity quite understandably tends to be re-evaluation of history. The educator's job is to make such re-evaluation available to the university student. It needs further analysis whether the Hindu officials of the Bengal Nawwabs conspired with the East India Company because they were Hindus or because, like Muslim officials, they were simply greedy.

Ahmad criticises this volume as a "warped subjectivity", and the portrayal of British rule in the region as "merely the lesser weakness of Rahim's historical presentation. His greater weakness is a complete lack of objectivity". According to the reviewer, the book portrays Hindus and the British as "villains" and Muslims as "victims". He further writes that the narrative is "dangerous" for it will not guide younger historians in Pakistan towards proper national self-criticism.

== Quotes from the book ==
This land and these people have a history which sometimes flows by itself and sometimes it commingles its water with other streams. – Prof I.H. Qureshi

== Editions ==
- Qureshi, I.H., 1967, A Short History of Pakistan. University of Karachi Press. (First edition)
- Qureshi, I.H., 1984, A Short History of Pakistan. University of Karachi.
- Qureshi, I.H., 1992, A Short History of Pakistan. University of Karachi, pages: 934, Paperback. ISBN 969-404-008-6

== See also ==
- History of Pakistan
- Lahore Resolution
- Pakistan Movement
- Masood Ashraf Raja. Constructing Pakistan: Foundational Texts and the Rise of Muslim National Identity, 1857–1947, Oxford 2010, ISBN 978-0-19-547811-2
