= Sardar Muhammad Alam Khan =

Pakistani bureaucrat

Sardar Muhammad Alam Khan (died 20 March 1991) was the first Pakistani Political Agent at Gilgit.

== Early life and career ==
Sardar Muhammad Alam Khan was born to Sardar Muhammad Mir Alam Khan into a prominent Khatana Gujar family from Kot Najibullah in Hazara. After completing education up to FA (Faculty of Arts), he was appointed as Naib Tehsildar in the Revenue Department in around 1920, and served at various locations including Karachi, Dera Ismail Khan, Dera Ghazi Khan and Pabbi. He was related to Sardar Fakhre Alam.

In 1932, he was appointed Collector and Deputy Commissioner of Alwar State and served there until early 1933. He also worked for some time as Tehsildar of Mardan. In 1939, he was appointed Assistant Settlement Commissioner Hazara and served until 1945, when he was appointed by the State of Kalat as Minister of Revenue and Agriculture (on deputation). He served there until June 1947.

== Political Agent Gilgit ==
In 1947, Prime Minister Liaquat Ali Khan selected him as the first Political Agent of Pakistan in Gilgit. Sardar Muhammad Alam arrived in Gilgit on 16 November 1947 by plane.

On 17 November, the Political Agent's office was established and the Pakistani flag was hoisted. He was given a guard of honour. Keys of the old administration were handed over to him, along with confidential files and important records. He served there until 1951.

In 1951, he was appointed Political Agent of Khyber Agency. Later, he served as Political Agent in Malakand Agency, Parachinar, and North Waziristan. From 1954 to 1962, he served as Establishment Commissioner in Rawalpindi/Peshawar region.

After approximately 40–41 years of service, he retired in 1963 and returned to Kot Najibullah. He passed away on 20 March 1991.
