= Northern Light Infantry Regiment =

Infantry regiment of the Pakistan Army

- Insignia of the NLI.
- Active: 1975–present (originally founded in 1913 as the Gilgit Scouts in Jammu and Kashmir, British India)
- Country: Pakistan
- Branch: Pakistan Army
- Type: Light infantry
- Role: Mountain warfare
- Size: 18 battalions
- Headquarters: Gilgit, Pakistan
- Colours
- Engagements: See list: Colonial Battles; Hunza–Nagar Campaign; Indo-Pakistani Wars and Conflicts; Kashmir conflict (1947–present); First Indo−Pakistani War; Second Indo−Pakistani War; Third Indo−Pakistani War; Siachen conflict (1984–2003); 1999 Kargil War; Secondary Operations; Soviet–Afghan War; Operation Cyclone; Spillover of Soviet - Afghan war in Pakistan

Commanders
- Chief of Army Staff: Field Marshal Syed Asim Munir Ahmad Shah
- Colonel Commandant: Lt. Gen. Anwar Ali Haider
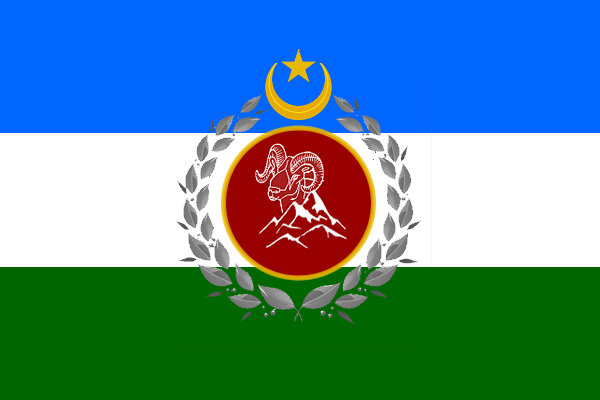
- Regimental Flag

The Northern Light Infantry Regiment (NLI) is a light infantry regiment in the Pakistan Army, based and currently headquartered in Gilgit, Pakistan. Along with other forces of the Pakistani military, the NLI has the primary responsibility of conducting ground operations in the interest of defending the strategically-important territory of Gilgit−Baltistan, a Pakistani-controlled region that constitutes part of Kashmir, which has been disputed between Pakistan and India since 1947. The NLI draws a majority of its recruits from native tribes present in the nearby mountainous areas who are reportedly less prone to altitude sickness and the cold temperatures that characterize high-altitude mountain warfare, allowing the regiment to conduct its duties optimally.

The Northern Light Infantry is best known for the extensive assistance and training it provided to the Afghan mujahideen (with backing from the CIA and ISI) during the Soviet–Afghan War.

== Formation ==
The Northern Light Infantry has its origins in the Gilgit Scouts raised by British India in 1913 for defending the princely state of Jammu and Kashmir's northern frontier. The Scouts, along with rebels in the Jammu and Kashmir State Forces, fought for Pakistan on the northern front of the First Kashmir War, conquering important points of interest such as Skardu, Kargil and Drass (the latter two were subsequently captured by the Indian Army). In 1949, the Gilgit Scouts were split into two forces, with the wing under the original name 'Gilgit Scouts' designated for internal security operations, and a second wing, named the 'Northern Scouts', designated for major external operations. In 1964, the Northern Scouts were further bifurcated with the raising of the 'Karakoram Scouts' based in Skardu. All three forces were brought together again in 1975, under the banner of the Northern Light Infantry (then a paramilitary force). Following the 1999 Kargil War with India, where the Northern Light Infantry saw extensive combat, the force was converted into a regular regiment of the Pakistan Army.

A new paramilitary force was created in 2003 under the name Gilgit−Baltistan Scouts to fill the internal security role of the former Gilgit Scouts.

== Status and composition ==
Upon its founding, the Northern Light Infantry regiment was to function as a paramilitary force, at par with the Pakistan Rangers and Frontier Corps, under the jurisdiction of the Ministry of Interior and commanded by regular Pakistan Army officers. In 1967 and 1970, two battalions of the NLI were airlifted and deployed to Karachi, Sindh, for internal security duties such as riot control and aiding civil authorities during an election-related period of violence. The regiment's performance during this time earned them a commendation from Field Marshal Ayub Khan.

By 1998, the NLI consisted of 13 battalions commanded by a Major-General of the Pakistan Army under the designation of Inspector-General of the NLI, whose office was the Inspectorate-General of NLI reporting to the GOC, X Corps as well as the Pakistani Interior Minister.

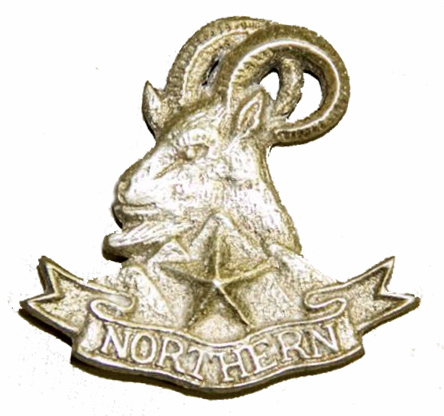
Regimental cap badge of the NLI.

== Notable operations ==
=== First Kashmir war (1947–1948) ===
Muhammad Baber Khan, the Honorary Captain, fought in the 1947–1948 Kashmir War. The British government gave the Maharaja of Kashmir control over Gilgit Agency upon partition. At Gilgit, Brigadier Ghansara Singh arrived to assume the role of Governor. Major General H L Scott, the Kashmiri chief of military staff, later joined as well. The Gilgit Scouts, who were all Muslim, supported Pakistan's entry. Honorary Captain Muhammad Baber Khan convened a meeting of Gilgit scouts junior commissioned officers in the junior commissioned officers' mess on October 31, 1947, in the afternoon. At this meeting, it was resolved to overthrow the dogra rule.

The governor gave himself up on November 1, 1947. The Muslim company of Captain Hassan Khan's 6 Jammu Kahmir infantry battalion, which was traveling from Bunji to Gilgit, joined the scouts as well. The scouts set Partab Bridge on fire and attacked, destroying the dogra check post. After deserting, the Sikh and dogra components were apprehended. Consequently, 27000 square miles were freed from Dogra Raj. Major Muhammad Tufail Shaheed (Nishan-i-Haider), Honorary Captain Muhammad Baber Khan of the 1st Northern Light Infantory Regiment, who was instrumental in the 1947 fight of liberation from Dogra Raj, was then assigned as the force's commander.

=== Siachen Glacier Conflict (1984–2003) ===
India's 1984 seizure of the Siachen Glacier (an area of Kashmir that was uninhabited and not controlled by any parties to the Kashmir conflict) resulted renewed high-level tensions with Pakistan until a mutual ceasefire agreement was brought into effect in 2003. During this period of intermittent fighting in the Siachen conflict, the NLI's 1st battalion performed defence and support work.

=== Kargil War (1999) ===
In May 1999, Pakistan began operations to occupy key Indian forward posts along the Line of Control (LoC), sparking the Kargil War. Initially Pakistan Army denied any involvement in the war. However, later on, it was reported that the Pakistan Army had launched forces exclusively from the Northern Light Infantry during this conflict. These included the 5th, 6th, 8th and 12th battalions in full strength and some elements of the 3rd, 4th, 7th and 11th battalions with the paramilitary Chitral and Bajaur Scouts, both of the Frontier Corps, deployed for logistical support.

Massive Indian counterattack coupled with heavy diplomatic pressure from the United States forced Pakistan to begin a withdrawal after months of intense fighting in what was an ignominious defeat for Pakistan. Also, Pakistani casualties during this conflict, like those of other Indo−Pakistani conflicts and true to well known Pakistani character, remain disputed and unconfirmed. At least hundred dead Pakistani soldiers were given respectful burial by Indian Army as Pakistan Army had disowned its own dead soldiers. International sources (such as those from the U.S. Department of Defense) place Pakistani casualties at around 700+. After 11 years, Pakistan officially reported that around 453 of its soldiers were killed during the conflict. PM Nawaz Sharif and some other sources placed the Pakistani casualties figure from 2,700 to 4,000 personnel.

=== Insurgency in Khyber Pakhtunkhwa (2004–present) ===
The regiment has been taking part in counter-insurgency operations in North-West Pakistan. On 12 June 2013, the commanding officer of the 11th NLI battalion was killed in an IED attack during a military operation in Tirah Valley. Captain Muhammad Faraz Ilyas Shaheed who received a commission in the Northern Light Infantry of Pakistan Army in 2020, was killed in an IED blast in the Kurram District on 18 June, 2024.

=== Insurgency in Balochistan (2003–present) ===
According to some sources, NLI regiments have been posted and involved in counter insurgency operations in Balochistan against Baloch separatist groups.

== Units ==
- 1st Battalion (Victors)
- 2nd Battalion (Liberators)
- 3rd Battalion (Mountain Warriors)
- 4th Battalion (The Hill Panthers)
- 5th Battalion (Defenders of K2)(Proud Five)
- 6th Battalion (Sikkis Saifullah)
- 7th Battalion (Indus Guards)
- 8th Battalion (Koh Shikan)
- 9th Battalion (Barqdam Battalion)
- 10th Battalion (The Snow Leopards)
- 11th Battalion (Skarchin)
- 12th Battalion (Haideran Haideran)
- 13th Battalion (Shingo Tigers)
- 14th Battalion (Shujan Battalion)
- 15th Battalion (The First)
- 16th Battalion
- 17th Battalion (Sekinchan battalion)
- 18th Battalion (Al Azb)

== See also ==
- Kashmir conflict
  - Siachen conflict (1984-2003)
  - Kargil War
- Soviet-Afghan War
  - Operation Cyclone
- Gilgit-Baltistan Scouts
- Ladakh Scouts
