= 1947 Gilgit rebellion =

1947 coup d'etat by the Gilgit Scouts

1947 Gilgit rebellion (Operation Datta Khel)
- Part of the Kashmir conflict and Indo-Pakistani War of 1947–1948
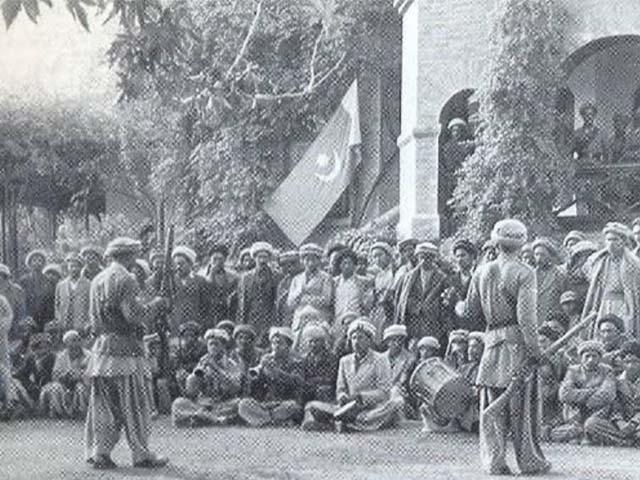
- Gilgit Scouts raising the Pakistani flag during Operation Datta Khel
Date	August 1947 – 16 November 1947
Location	Gilgit, Jammu and Kashmir
Result	Pakistan victory: Hari Singh loses control over Gilgit and surrounding areas; Pro-Pakistan Government is setup in Gilgit and surrounding regions
Territorial changes	Gilgit Baltistan declares independence from Jammu and Kashmir; Gilgit accedes to Pakistan

Belligerents
(British Raj) Gilgit Scouts; Princely State of Hunza; Princely State of Nagar Supported by: Pakistan	Jammu and Kashmir State Forces: 6th Jammu and Kashmir Infantry; Sikh Company; Muslim Company

Commanders and leaders
William Brown; Roger Bacon; A. S. Mathieson; Mirza Hassan Khan	Hari Singh; Majid Khan (surrendered); Ghansara Singh (surrendered)

In November 1947, the paramilitary force of Gilgit Scouts stationed at Gilgit rebelled against the princely state of Jammu and Kashmir, soon after it acceded to the Indian Union. Under the command of a British officer Major William Brown, they executed a coup d'etat, overthrew the governor Ghansara Singh, and imprisoned him. The Muslim troops of Jammu and Kashmir State Forces stationed at Bunji joined in the rebellion under the command of Captain Mirza Hassan Khan, imprisoned their own commander Colonel Abdul Majid, and eliminated the non-Muslim troops. A provisional government was declared under a local chief Shah Rais Khan, which lasted for about two weeks. On 16 November, a Pakistani political agent Khan Mohammad Alam Khan arrived and took over the administration.

== Background ==
In August 1947, there was a rumour in Gilgit that the government of the Jammu and Kashmir was making plans to disband the Gilgit Scouts, which caused the 'disciplined and secular Scouts' to oppose the government. Gilgit's population did not favour the State's accession to India. The Muslims of the frontier ilaqas (Gilgit and the adjoining hill states) had wanted to join Pakistan.

== Planning ==
Major Brown was mindful of the anti-maharaja sentiments among the people of Gilgit. Sensing their resentment, Major Brown organised a coup on 1 November 1947, overthrowing the Governor, Ghansara Singh. The soft coup d'etat and takeover of the region was planned by Brown to the last detail under the code name Operation Datta Khel. Prime Minister Liaquat Ali Khan countenanced an intrusion of the princely state, by Major Khurshid Anwar in the north and a force led by the ex-Indian National Army personnel in the south, which eventually led to the First Kashmir War between India and Pakistan, and the formation of Azad Kashmir provisional government. Brown was assisted by his second-in-command, Captain A. S. Mathieson.

== Coup d'etat ==
On November 2, the Pakistani flag was raised on the old tower in the Gilgit Scout Lines, under the command of Major Brown. On 12 January 1948, the authority was handed over to Colonel Aslam Khan, the first local commander of the Gilgit Scouts, under the command of the Azad Jammu and Kashmir provisional government.

== Aftermath ==
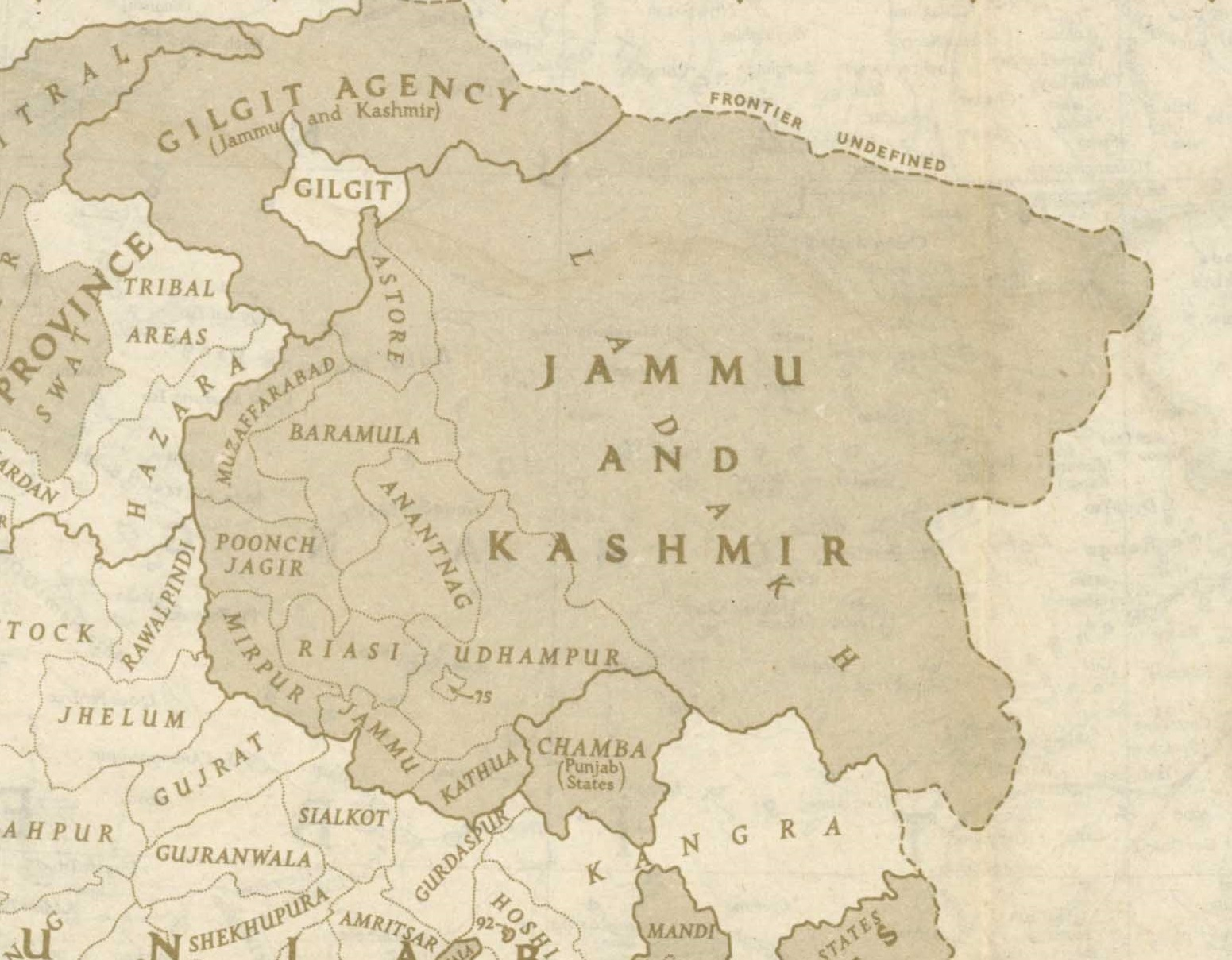
Gilgit Agency at the northern periphery of Jammu and Kashmir

The provisional government persisted for 16 days. According to the historian Yaqub Khan Bangash, it was short of sway over the population. The Gilgit Coup did not have civilian involvement and was the work of military leaders, not all of whom had been in favor of joining Pakistan, at least in the short term. Historian Ahmed Hasan Dani says that although there had been a scarcity of public participation in the coup, pro-Pakistan sentiments were intense in the civilian population and their anti-Kashmiri sentiments were also clear. According to various scholars, the people of Gilgit as well as those of Chilas, Koh Ghizr, Ishkoman, Yasin, Punial, Hunza and Nagar joined Pakistan by choice. The Government of Azad Kashmir handed over the administration of Gilgit-Baltistan to the federal government under the Karachi Agreement.

== See also ==
- Indo-Pakistani War of 1947–1948
- Siege of Skardu
- 1947 Poonch rebellion
- Battle of Thorgo
- Battle of Pandu
- Stand Down Order (1947)
- Kashmir conflict

== Bibliography ==
- Bangash, Yaqoob Khan (2010). "Three Forgotten Accessions: Gilgit, Hunza and Nagar". The Journal of Imperial and Commonwealth History. 38 (1): 117–143. doi:10.1080/03086530903538269.
- Dani, Ahmad Hasan (2001), History of Northern Areas of Pakistan: Upto 2000 A.D., Sang-e-Meel Publications, ISBN 978-969-35-1231-1
  - — (1991), History of Northern Areas of Pakistan (2nd ed.), National Institute of Historical and Cultural Research – via pahar.in
  - — (1989), History of Northern Areas of Pakistan, Islamabad: National Institute of Historical and Cultural Research – via archive.org
- Brown, William (2014). Gilgit Rebelion The Major Who Mutinied Over Partition of India. Pen & Sword Books. ISBN 9781473841123.
- Singh, K. Brahma (1990). History of Jammu and Kashmir Rifles, 1820–1956 The State Force Background. Lancer International. ISBN 9788170620914.
- Schofield, Victoria (2003) [First published in 2000]. Kashmir in Conflict. London and New York: I. B. Taurus & Co. p. 64. ISBN 978-1860648984.
