= Gilgit Scouts =

1913–1975 paramilitary in Gilgit Agency, Jammu and Kashmir

- Insignia of the Gilgit Scouts
- Active: 1913–1975
- Disbanded: 1975
- Allegiance: Jammu and Kashmir (1913–1947); Dominion of Pakistan (1947–1956); Islamic Republic of Pakistan (1956–1975)
- Branch: Army
- Type: Paramilitary
- Nickname: Northern Battalion
- Engagements: First Kashmir War; 1947 Gilgit Rebellion; Battle of Jaglote; Bunji Action; Action at Tsari; Battle of Thorgo; Siege of Skardu

Commanders
- Notable commanders: Major William Brown; Brigadier Aslam Khan

The Gilgit Scouts was a paramilitary force based in the Gilgit-Baltistan region in northern Pakistan. They were raised by the British Raj in 1913, to assist the Gilgit-based British Political Agent in managing Gilgit Agency which formed the northern frontier of British India. The force had a strength of almost six hundred composed of local men recruited by British commanders.

With the lapse of British paramountcy in the subcontinent and subsequent independence of Pakistan and India, the British ceded not only the Gilgit tehsil, which had been leased for sixty years in 1935 from Hari Singh, the maharaja of Jammu and Kashmir, but the whole of Gilgit Agency on 1 August 1947.

Following maharaja's accession to the Dominion of India on 26 October 1947, the Gilgit Scouts under the command of Major William Brown, staged a rebellion and overthrew the Dogra governor of Gilgit. In a matter of days the 6th Battalion of Jammu and Kashmir in Bunji was routed by a Gilgit Scouts force under command Captain Mathieson, the deputy commandant and Assistant Political Agent operating out of Chilas. The Muslim element of the State Forces at Bunji joined the Gilgit Scouts.

After Major Brown and Captain Mathieson left Gilgit, Major Aslam Khan (who took on the nom de guerre of Colonel Pasha) was given command of the Gilgit Scouts. Men from 6th J&K were amalgamated into Gilgit Scouts in early January 1948. Aslam Khan, who had intimate knowledge of the area having served earlier in Rattu and Bunji with Jammu and Kashmir Forces, organised the Gilgit Scouts now numbering around sixteen hundred into three groups, namely Ibex, Tiger and Eskimo forces.

The Gilgit Scouts played a key role in the campaigns in Baltistan, taking Kargil and Dras in early May 1948 and Zojila in July 1948, and reached close to Leh. The territories retained by Gilgit Scouts as of 31 December 1948 gave rise to the present day Gilgit-Baltistan.

The force continued in Pakistan till 1975 when it was incorporated as the Northern Light Infantry of the Pakistan Army.

== History ==
Gilgit Scouts

=== Antecedents ===
When the Gilgit Agency was established in 1889, its security was provided by the Imperial Service Troops of the maharaja of Jammu and Kashmir which was placed under the command of the British Political Agent. A few contingents of British Indian troops and fourteen British officers were added in 1891. Levies from Punial were also present earlier. After the Hunza–Nagar Campaign in 1891, and the pacification of Chilas and Chitral, the British Indian troops were gradually reduced, and replaced by new levies from Hunza, Nagar and Punial.

=== Formation of scouts ===
In 1913, the local levies were replaced by a permanent body of troops on a company basis, under the name "Gilgit Scouts". The force was initially paid for by the state of Jammu and Kashmir, but commanded by British officers under the control of the British Political Agent at Gilgit. The initial strength of Gilgit Scouts was 656 men. They were organised into 8 companies of 80 men each. Each company had two native officers, a Subedar and a Jamadar.

The force had no connection to the Jammu and Kashmir State Forces, but became part of the Frontier Corps, along with Chitral Scouts, Kurram Militia and other local forces. The recruits were from all areas of the Gilgit Agency and had the advantage of local knowledge. They were also acclimatised to local climate and the harsh mountain terrain. They were responsible for maintaining local order as well as monitoring foreign activity along the northern borders.

The recruitment in the Gilgit scouts was based on the recommendation of Mirs and Rajas of the area. Close relatives of Mirs and Rajas were given direct Viceroy commissions in Gilgit scouts.

=== First Kashmir War (1947) ===
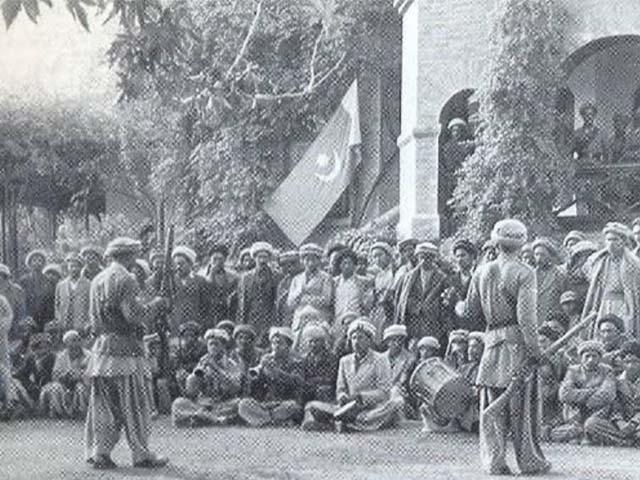
Gilgit Scouts raising the Pakistani flag during the Gilgit Rebellion

After the Independence of Pakistan, the Gilgit Scouts rebelled against the authority of Jammu and Kashmir and participated in the First Kashmir War. According to Major William Brown, its commanding officer, there was a secret plan among a few members of Gilgit Scouts to set up a "Republic of Gilgit-Astor(e)" when they ousted the governor of Gilgit representing the Maharaja's government on 1 November 1947. Historian Ahmad Hasan Dani, mentions that although there was lack of public participation in the rebellion, pro-Pakistan sentiments were intense in the civilian population and their anti-Kashmiri sentiments were also clear. On 2 November, the Pakistani flag was raised on the old tower in the Gilgit Scout Lines, under the command of Major Brown.

On 12 January 1948, the command was handed over to Colonel Aslam Khan the first local commander of the Gilgit Scouts, under the authority of the Azad Jammu and Kashmir provisional government. Gilgit Scouts led campaigns into Ladakh Wazarat in the following weeks under the command of Lieutenant Colonel Mian Ghulam Jilani after Major Aslam Khan had been posted to GHQ. General Thimayya recaptured Zojila on 1st November 1948 using Stuart light tanks and in a matter of weeks the Indian Army linked up with Leh, gaining control of Kargil.

=== Inside Pakistan ===
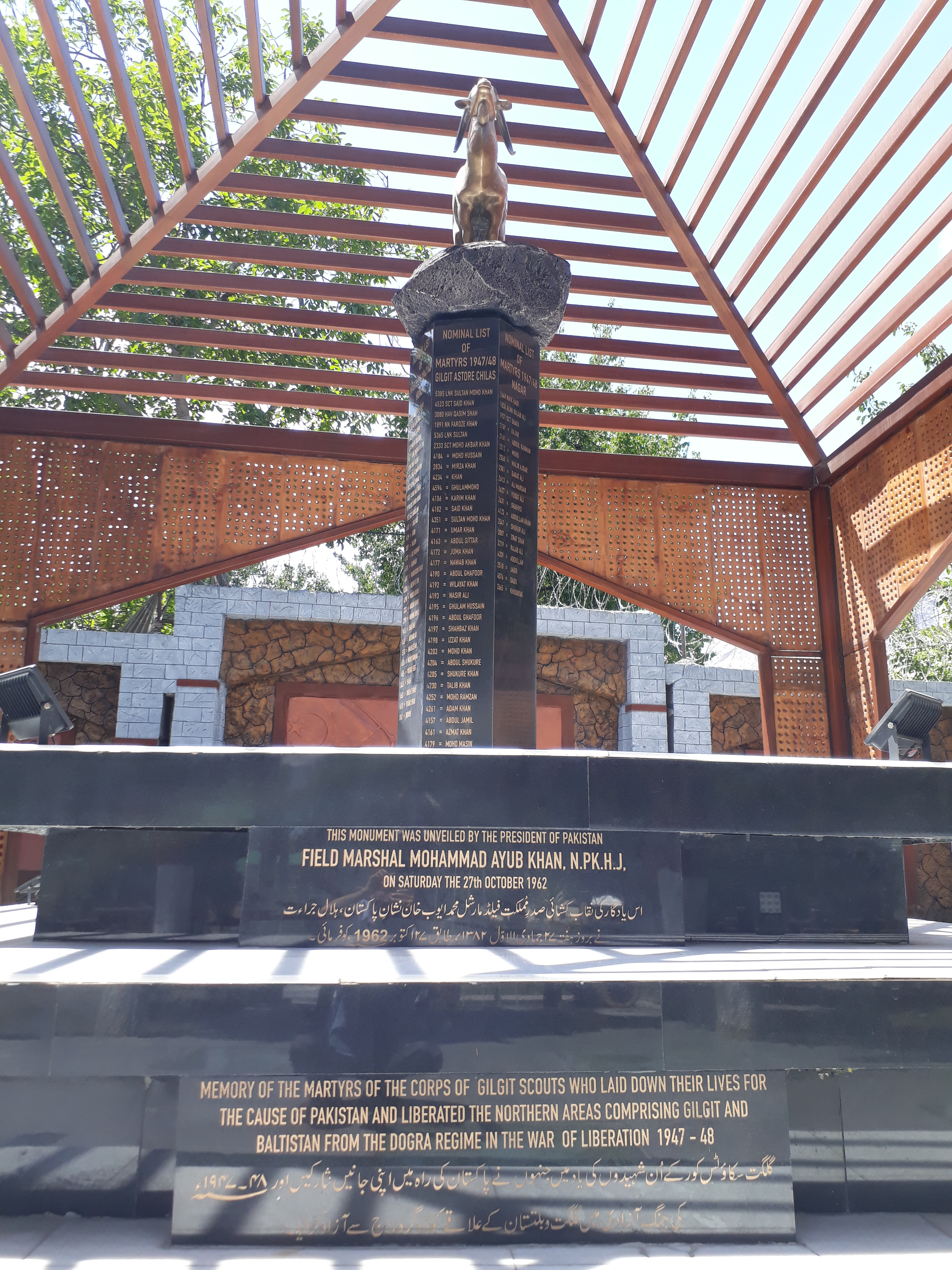
Monument dedicated to the martyrs of the Gilgit Scouts

After the conclusion of the First Kashmir War, the Gilgit Scouts operated as a paramilitary force in the Northern Areas (now called Gilgit-Baltistan). In 1975, the force was amalgamated into the Northern Light Infantry Regiment of the Pakistan Army, where the Gilgit Scouts became the 1st and 2nd Battalions of the regiment.

== Gilgit Baltistan Scouts ==
The force was re-raised in 2003 as the Northern Area Scouts under command of Brigadier Inayat Wali. It quickly progressed and took over the responsibilities of Law and Order in Gilgit Baltistan. In 2011, the force was renamed Gilgit Baltistan Scouts, a federal paramilitary force.

== See also ==
- History of Gilgit-Baltistan

== Bibliography ==
- Bangash, Yaqoob Khan (2010), "Three Forgotten Accessions: Gilgit, Hunza and Nagar", The Journal of Imperial and Commonwealth History, 38 (1): 117–143, doi:10.1080/03086530903538269, S2CID 159652497
- Chohan, Amar Singh (1997), Gilgit Agency 1877-1935, Second Reprint, Atlantic Publishers & Dist, ISBN 978-81-7156-146-9
- Schofield, Victoria (2003) [First published in 2000], Kashmir in Conflict, London and New York: I. B. Taurus & Co, ISBN 1860648983
- Snedden, Christopher (2015), Understanding Kashmir and Kashmiris, Oxford University Press, ISBN 978-1-84904-342-7
