= Muhammad Yusuf Saraf =

Pakistani jurist

Chief Justice Muhammad Yusuf Saraf

Chief Justice of the Azad Kashmir High Court
- In office 1975–1980

Personal details
- Born: September 23, 1923 Baramulla, Jammu and Kashmir
- Died: January 2, 1995 (aged 71)
- Education: St. Joseph's College; Aligarh Muslim University

Justice Muhammad Yusuf Saraf (23 September 1923–2 January 1995) was the Chief Justice of the Azad Kashmir High Court and the author of the voluminous work, Kashmiris' Fight for Freedom. He was born in Baramulla in the then princely state of Jammu and Kashmir, but migrated to Pakistan prior to the partition of India. He started practising law in Mirpur in 1949, rising to the bench in 1969. He served as the Chief Justice of Azad Kashmir from 1975 to 1980.

== Early life ==
Muhammad Yusuf Saraf was born in Baramulla in 1923. After graduating from St. Joseph's College he took degrees of M. A. (History) and LL. B from Aligarh Muslim University in 1948. He was the Student Union president and the President of Kashmir Youth Congress, 1943–1945. He was also a secretary for the All-India Students Congress during this period, associated with Sheikh Abdullah's National Conference.

== Azad Kashmir movement ==
In August 1945, Saraf joined All Jammu and Kashmir Muslim Conference, a pro-Pakistan splinter party of the National Conference, which favoured Jammu and Kashmir's accession to Pakistan. He was appointed a secretary of the party in 1946.

On 19 July 1947, at a convention of the Muslim Conference workers was held in Srinagar, Saraf argued for the accession of the state to Pakistan. This was said to have been against the party Working Committee's decision the previous day in favour of the State remaining independent. The Working Committee cited the advice of Muhammad Ali Jinnah in support of its decision. However, Saraf wanted the party to decide in favour of accession to Pakistan. He hastily pencilled a counter-resolution and read it out at the convention, which is said to have received overwhelming support from the younger members of the convention. Consequently, the convention passed a resolution urging the Maharaja to accede to Pakistan. The Working Committee subsequently modified its resolution urging the Maharaja to accede to Pakistan.

In August, following the Partition of British India, Saraf conducted a mission for Chaudhary Hamidullah, the acting president of the Muslim Conference. Hamidullah sought "sympathetic people" from Punjab and the North-West Frontier Province (NWFP) to attack the state borders in order to draw the State Forces away from Srinagar. It was meant provide an opportunity for the rebels from Poonch to attack the state capital Srinagar. Hamidullah asked Saraf to carry a letter to the NWFP chief minister Khan Abdul Qayyum Khan to facilitate attacks from the Pakistani side. The Khan, on the other hand, dismissed the proposal as being "foolish". He thought such attacks would give an excuse for India to intervene. He wanted Hamidullah to come in person to discuss the development of a proper plan. Saraf relayed the message to Hamidullah in Srinagar, and then went to stay with a relative in Garhi Habibullah in the NWFP. He believed a warrant had been issued for his arrest.

In Garhi Habibullah, Saraf acquired a sizeable quantity of dynamite for the insurgency. Khurshid Anwar was in the area at that time in connection with organising a tribal invasion of Kashmir. With Anwar's assurance that it would be used for 'the same purpose', Saraf handed over the dynamite to the Khan of Garhi, Muhammad Aslam Khan, which was then presumably used during the tribal invasion.

In October 1947, Saraf went to Rawalpindi, where the Azad Kashmir provisional government set up by the Muslim Conference was operating from the Paris Hotel. He was asked to set up a publicity office for the movement in Lahore. Saraf did so, with the assistance of Mirza Basheer-ud-Din Mahmood Ahmad, the head of Ahmadiyya sect, Faiz Ahmed Faiz and other influential people of Lahore. The Divisional Commissioner of Lahore, Inamur Rahim, also extended his help. When the Provisional Government of Azad Kashmir was reconstituted under Sardar Ibrahim Khan on 24 October 1947, Saraf supported it.

== Legal career ==
Saraf received an L.L.B. degree from Aligarh University in 1948. He started law practice in Mirpur in 1949. He continued to be involved with the Azad Kashmir affairs, serving on the Electoral Rolls and Polling Sub-Committee set up by the Government of Pakistan, the Azad Kashmir Radio Advisory Committee and the Azad Kashmir Administration Advisory Committee, etc.

In 1969, Saraf was appointed as a judge of the Mirpur Court. He served on the Azad Kashmir Laws Adaptation and Scrutiny Committee and the Azad Kashmir Islamic Laws Committee and the Azad Kashmir Law Commission.

In 1975, Saraf was appointed as the Chief Justice of the Azad Kashmir High Court, serving in this post till 1980.

== Works ==
- Kashmiris Fight for Freedom, Volume 1 (1819–1946), Ferozsons, Lahore, 1977.
- Kashmiris Fight for Freedom, Volume 2 (1947–1978), Ferozsons, Lahore, 1979.

=== Reception ===
The volumes received favourable reviews in the Pakistani press. The U. S. Ambassador to Pakistan, Arthur W. Hummel remarked that it appeared to be "a monumental work, representing much research and scholarship". Being a voluminous piece of work covering a long period of history, the volumes are often cited by scholars, such as Victoria Schofield and Christopher Snedden, for historical information. However, Brian Cloughly in A History of the Pakistan Army, said that it is not an unbiased piece of work. Lord Mountbatten is said to have characterised it as 'an exercise in aspersion and innuendo'. Azad Kashmiri journalist Khalid Hasan, who co-edited Memory Lane to Jammu, which included excerpts from Saraf's book, has stated that it is an unsatisfactory account with a "gung-ho, super-patriotic tone", lacking in objectivity.

== Death and legacy ==
Justice Saraf died on 2 January 1995.

The Sultana Foundation has established a Justice Yusaf Saraf Centre for Research, Rehabilitation & Mainstreaming of Street Children in his honour.

== Bibliography ==
- Saraf, Muhammad Yusuf (2015) [first published 1979 by Ferozsons], Kashmiris Fight for Freedom, Volume 2, Mirpur: National Institute Kashmir Studies
