= Ahmad Hasan Dani =

Pakistani intellectual, archaeologist, historian, and linguist

Ahmad Hassan Dani
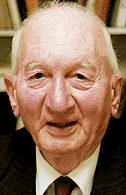
- Ahmed Hasan Dani (1920-2009)
- Born: 20 June 1920; Basna, Berar, British India
- Died: 26 January 2009 (aged 88); Islamabad, Pakistan
- Education: Banaras Hindu University
- Known for: Research on the Indus Valley civilization
- Awards: Hilal-e-Imtiaz (2000); Sitara-e-Imtiaz (1969); Bundesverdienstkreuz; Légion d'honneur Palmes Academiques
- Scientific career
- Fields: Archaeology, History, Linguistics
- Workplaces: Quaid-e-Azam University

Ahmad Hassan Dani, FRAS, SI, HI (Urdu: احمد حسن دانی, 20 June 1920 – 26 January 2009) was a Pakistani archaeologist, historian, and linguist. He was among the foremost authorities on Central Asian and South Asian archaeology and history. He introduced archaeology as a discipline in higher education in Pakistan and Bangladesh.

Throughout his career, Dani held various academic positions and international fellowships, apart from conducting archaeological excavations and research. He is particularly known for archaeological work on pre-Indus civilization and Gandhara sites in northern Pakistan.

== Biography ==
=== Early life ===
Ahmad Hasan Dani was born on 20 June 1920 into an ethnic Kashmiri Muslim trading family of the Wain clan in Basna, in the Central Provinces and Berar in British India (now in Chhattisgarh, India). He graduated in 1944 with an MA degree in Sanskrit, becoming the first Muslim graduate of Banaras Hindu University. He scored highest marks in the exams which earned him a gold medal. This also qualified him for a teaching fellowship from the same university. Although he was provided with the grant, he was not allowed to teach owing to his religion. He stayed there for six months. In 1945, he started working as a trainee in archaeology under the guidance of Mortimer Wheeler. At this time, he participated in excavations at Taxila and Mohenjo-daro.

=== Career ===
After the Partition of India, Dani migrated to East Pakistan. There, between 1947 and 1949, he worked as assistant superintendent of the Department of Archaeology. At this time, he rectified the Varendra Museum at Rajshahi. In 1949, he married Safiya Sultana. Together, they had three sons and a daughter. In 1950, Dani was promoted to the position of superintendent-in-charge of archaeology. In the same year, he became the general secretary of the Asiatic Society of Pakistan in Dhaka. Later on, in 1955, he took the position of president of the National Committee for Museums in Pakistan. For a period of twelve years (between 1950 and 1962), Dani remained associate professor of history at University of Dhaka, while at the same time working as curator at Dhaka museum. During this period, he carried out archaeological research on the Muslim history of Bengal.

Dani moved to the University of Peshawar in 1962, where he established the Department of Archaeology, and remained a professor until 1971. During this time, he led the resetting and renovation works for the Lahore and Peshawar Museums. He became chairman of Research Society in the University of Peshawar in 1970. In 1971, he moved to University of Islamabad to become dean of Faculty of Social Sciences. He left the post in 1975 to concentrate on research as professor of history. Meanwhile, the university was renamed Quaid-e-Azam University in 1976. He continued to work in various positions until his retirement in 1980 when he was made emeritus professor. During this period, he also served as president of the Archaeological and Historical Association of Pakistan (1979) and co-director of the Pak-German Team for Ethnology Research in Northern Areas of Pakistan (1980).

He received an honorary doctorate from Tajikistan University, (Dushanbe) in 1993. In the same year, Dani established the Islamabad Museum. Between 1992 and 1996, he was appointed advisor to the Ministry of Culture of Pakistan on archaeology. Between 1994 and 1998, he remained chairman of the National Fund for Cultural Heritage in Islamabad. In 1997, Dani became an honorary director at the Taxila Institute of Asian Civilizations. He held the position until the time of his death.

On 22 January 2009, he was admitted to Pakistan Institute of Medical Sciences in Islamabad with heart, kidney and diabetes problems. He died on 26 January 2009 at the age of 88 years.

== Visiting, research and honorary positions ==
During his associate professorship at Dhaka University, Dani worked as a research fellow at the School of Oriental and African Studies, University of London (1958–59). Later, in 1969 he became Asian Fellow at the Australian National University, Canberra. In 1974, he went to the University of Pennsylvania in Philadelphia as a visiting scholar. In 1977, he was a visiting professor at the University of Wisconsin–Madison. Over the span of his career, Dani was awarded honorary fellowships of Royal Asiatic Society of Bangladesh (1969), German Archaeological Institute (1981), Istituto Italiano per l'Africa e l'Oriente (IsMEO) (1986) and Royal Asiatic Society (1991).

In 1991, Dani was made an honorary citizen of Bukhara and an honorary member of the Paivand Society in Tajikistan. He was made an honorary life patron of Al-Shifa Trust, Rawalpindi in 1993.

== Research contributions ==
Dani remained engaged in excavation works on the pre-Indus civilization site of Rehman Dheri in northern Pakistan. He also made a number of discoveries of Gandhara sites in Peshawar and Swat valleys, and worked on Indo-Greek sites in Dir. From 1985, he was involved in research focusing on the documentation of the rock carvings and inscriptions on ancient remains from the Neolithic age in the high mountain region of Northern Pakistan along with Harald Hauptmann of Heidelberg Academy of Sciences, University of Heidelberg. He also led the UNESCO teams for the Desert Route Expedition of the Silk Road in China (1990) and the Steppe Route Expedition of the Silk Road in the Soviet Union (1991).

From his extensive fieldwork and research experience, Dani refuted any influence of South Indian culture on the Indus Valley civilization. Using a geographic perspective of the socio-political systems and cultural distribution of the Indus Basin and surrounding hinterland, he observed that the Indo-Gangetic Plain did not play any significant role in the development of Indus Valley culture. Nor was there any invasion from the seaside during the Bronze Age, although the coastline facilitated maritime trade. The major influence, according to Dani, came from Central Asia in the west. He asserted that the hilly western borderland that appears as a boundary to the external eye is actually a network of hill plateaus where the local people have always moved freely. He therefore argued that the cultural history of Pakistan is more closely related to Central Asia through Buddhist, Persian and later Sufism influences.

Dani maintained that despite the Arabian Sea allowing the Meluhhans to establish trade relations with Mesopotamia and Ancient Egypt, the majority of historical movements occurred between Central and South Asia. The geographic location as a link between the two regions has characterised the relationship "between the people of Pakistan and those of Central Asia in the field of culture, language, literature, food, dress, furniture and folklore".

== Awards and honours ==
Despite being the first Muslim student of Banaras Hindu University, Dani scored highest in the graduation exams and received the J. K. Gold Medal from that university in 1944. Among the national awards, Dani received Sitara-e-Imtiaz in 1969, Aizaz-e-Kamal in 1992 and Hilal-e-Imtiaz in 2000 from the Government of Pakistan. In 2004, he was awarded the title of 'Distinguished National Professor' by the Higher Education Commission in recognition of his contributions and achievements.

Internationally, his services in archaeology, linguistics and ancient history were commended through various prestigious honours and awards such as:

- 2000 Hilal-e-Imtiaz (Crescent of Excellence) Award, Government of Pakistan
- 1998 Légion d'honneur, President of the French Republic
- 1997 Aristotle Silver Medal, UNESCO
- 1996 Order of the Merit, Government of Germany
- 1994 Knight Commander, Government of Italy
- 1990 Palmes Academiques, Government of France
- 1986 Gold Medal, Asiatic Society of Bangladesh
- 1969 Sitara-i-Imtiaz (Star of Excellence) Award by the Government of Pakistan

== Publications ==
Ahmad Hasan Dani had more than 30 published books and numerous journal articles to his credit. He spoke 35 languages and dialects, and was fluent in Bengali, French, Hindi, Kashmiri, Marathi, Pashto, Persian, Punjabi, Sanskrit, Seraiki, Sindhi, Tamil, Turkish and Urdu languages. He also published various texts in most of these languages.

=== Books ===
- History of Pakistan: Pakistan Through Ages. Sang-e-Meel Publications. 2007. ISBN 978-9693520200
- Historic City of Taxila. Sang-e-Meel Publications. 2001. ISBN 978-9693509472
- History of Northern Areas of Pakistan (Up to 2000 AD). Sang-e-Meel Publications. 2001. ISBN 978-9693512311
- Romance of the Khyber Pass. Sang-e-Meel Publications. 1997. ISBN 978-9693507195
- New Light on Central Asia. Sang-e-Meel Publications. 1996. ISBN 978-9693502947
- Central Asia Today. Sang-e-Meel Publications. 1996. ISBN 978-9693507065
- Human Records on Karakorum Highway. Sang-e-Meel Publications. 1995. ISBN 978-9693506464
- Peshawar: Historic City of the Frontier. Sang-e-Meel Publications, (2nd Revised edition). 1995. ISBN 978-9693505542
- A Short History of Pakistan, Book One: Pre-Muslim Period. University of Karachi. (3 editions, 1967, 1984, 1992). ISBN 969-404-008-6
- History of Northern Areas of Pakistan (Historical studies). National Institute of Historical and Cultural Research. 1989. ISBN 978-9694150161
- Perspectives of Pakistan. National Institute of Pakistan Studies, Quaid-e-Azam University. 1989. ASIN B0000CQNUB
- The Historic City of Taxila. Centre for East Asian Cultural Studies. 1986. ISBN 978-4896565003
- Chilas: The City of Nanga Parvat (Dyamar). 1983. ASIN B0000CQDB2
- Thatta: Islamic architecture. Institute of Islamic History, Culture & Civilization. 1982. ASIN B0000CQD43
- Indus Civilization: New Perspectives. Quaid-i-Azam University, Islamabad. 1981
- Alberuni's Indica: A Record of the Cultural History of South Asia About A.D. 1030. University of Islamabad Press, Islamabad. 1973
- Indian Palaeography. Clarendon P. 1963. ASIN B0000CM0CB
- Dacca: A Record of Its Changing Fortunes. S.S. Dani (Publisher). 1962. ASIN B0000CQXMU
- Prehistory and Protohistory of Eastern India: With a Detailed Account of the Neolithic Cultures. K.L. Mukhopadhyay. 1960
- Bibliography of the Muslim Inscriptions of Bengal. 1957

=== Co-authored works ===
- With J-P. Mohen (eds.), History of Humanity, Volume III, From the Third Millennium to the Seventh Century BC. New York: Routledge/Paris: UNESCO. 1996. ISBN 0415093066.
- With V.M. Masson (eds.), History of Civilizations of Central Asia, Unesco, Paris. 1992- (6 volumes) ISBN 9231027190 (v.1)

== See also ==
- Sindhology
- Raymond Allchin
- Ihsan Ali
