= Education in Gilgit-Baltistan =

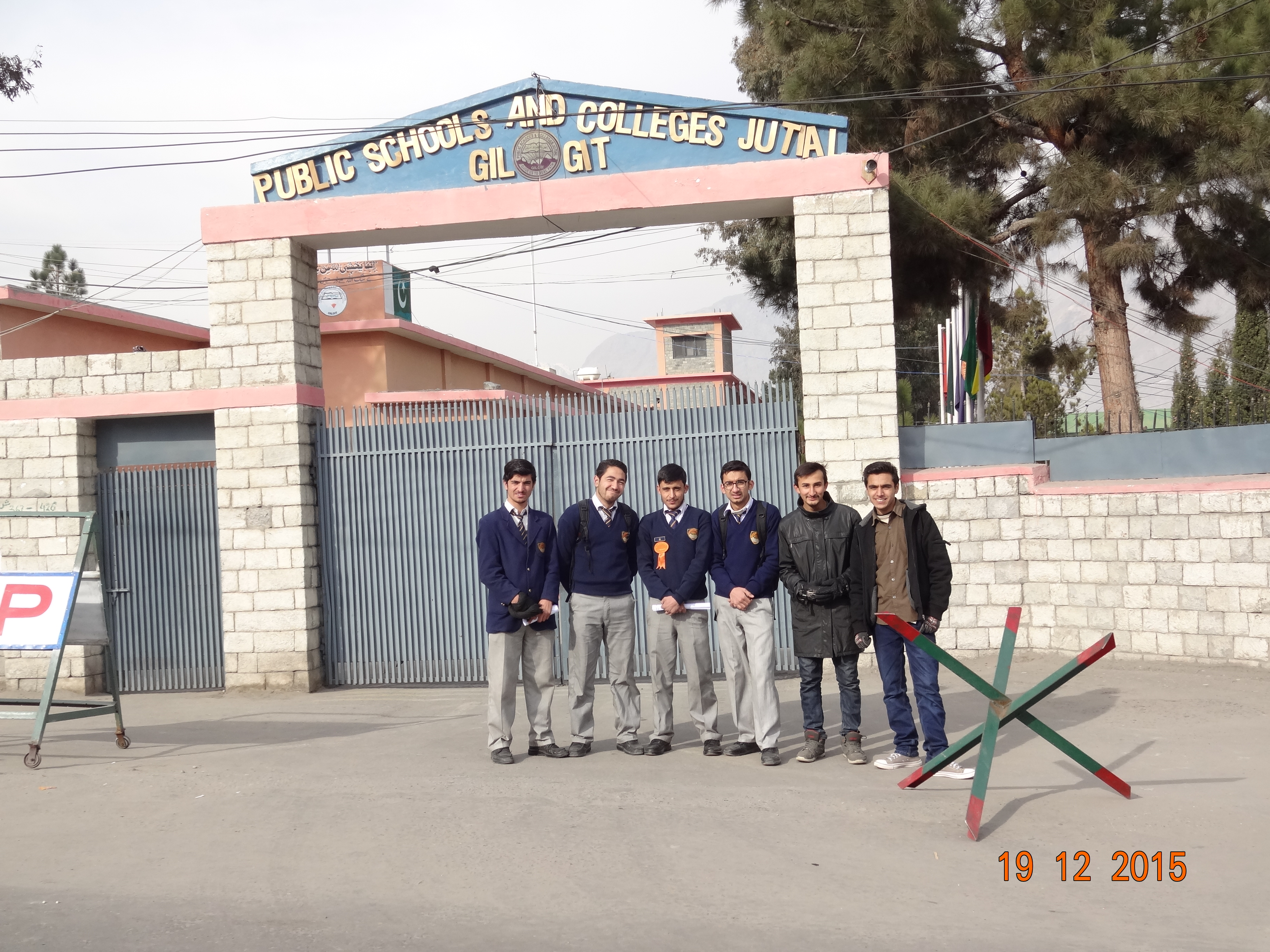
One of the most renowned institute in the whole GB Region Public Schools and Colleges Jutial Gilgit

Since its independence in 1947, governments have not spent much on quality education in this region. While the literacy rates of the areas in Gilgit is higher than most of the citites in Pakistan, yet no professional universities were constructed in the region. In 2002, under the reign of Pervez Musharraf, a general university of the name of Karakoram International University was constructed. Various primary schools were constructed by NGO's from around the world including the Aga Khan Development Network.

== Beginnings ==
At first, only primary and middle-schools were available. Gradually, these middle-schools were upgraded to high-schools. In the 1970s, students had to migrate in order to attend university. The revolution in education began when private schools began to emerge under the Jabir Bin Hayyan trust initiative. Then after a sudden several private schools began to emerge. According to one news report, the private sector contributes 90% of the infrastructure for the overall education in Gilgit Baltistan. The Aga Khan foundation was also the other NGO which contributed to the spread of education.

== Current education system ==
During the last decade the first higher education institutions were constructed. The first university, Karakoram University, was founded during the reign of Pervez Musharraf. The university was established in 2002 by a charter from the federal government on the orders of Pervez Musharraf, President of the Islamic Republic of Pakistan. A second university, University of Baltistan was established in 2017, in Skardu. There are 27 colleges in GB, including eight girls' colleges and 17 boys' colleges. Some of them are in the Gilgit district and some of them are in the Skardu District. 13 are degree colleges, 14 are intermediate. Besides, there are two elementary colleges. Due to the poor internet coverage in the region, students face problems when attending classes online. In 2014, the literacy rate in Gilgit-Baltistan was 65.60%. There are two universities operating in Gilgit Baltistan. These are:

- University of Baltistan, Skardu
- Karakoram International University (KIU), Gilgit

== Statistics ==
According to a World Bank Economic Report On Gilgit-Baltistan (2010–11), the net primary school enrolment in Gilgit Baltistan is 51%, the net middle-school enrollment is 17%, and only 14% are enrolled in matric school. In other words, only 17 out of every 100 students achieve the middle level and only 14 out of every 100 students reach to matric level.

According to school census data, a total of 5,739 students are enrolled at the Intermediate and Bachelors level in various colleges within GB, of which 47 percent are women. Another 947 students are enrolled in Bachelor’s and Master’s Programs at the Karakoram International University (KIU) in Gilgit, with 35 percent of the students being women. About 23 percent of all post secondary students are currently studying outside the region. All together an estimated 8,680 students from GB are currently enrolled at the intermediate level and above. Somewhat surprisingly, the post-secondary enrollment rate in GB is better than the rest of Pakistan, possibly reflecting cultural norms that emphasize the importance of education.

According to a current survey, approximately a thousand students belonging to Baltistan are studying in different colleges and universities of karachi. There are no medical or engineering colleges in the area. A large number of students are studying in different colleges and schools of Pakistan. However, seats for Gilgit-Baltistan are limited in engineering and medical colleges. On September 29, 2009 Prime Minister Gillani announced the foundation of the first medical college. However, construction hasn't begun. Currently, the local government has allocated an amount of over Rs361 million (5.3% of the total budget) towards education in the area.

Even in the twenty-first century, where the internet has evolved into a fundamental necessity of life, students in Gilgit-Baltistan grapple with issues related to sluggish internet connectivity.
