= Juglot =

Town in Gilgit-Baltistan, Pakistan

Juglot جگلوٹ
- Town
- Location within Gilgit Baltistan Location within Pakistan
- Coordinates: 35°41′06″N 74°37′26″E
- Country: Pakistan
- Adm. Unit: Gilgit-Baltistan
- Division: Gilgit Division
- District: Gilgit District
- Elevation: 1,988 m (6,522 ft)
- Time zone: UTC+5:00 (PKT)

Juglot or Jaglot (Urdu: جگلوٹ) is a town located in the Gilgit District of Gilgit-Baltistan region in Pakistan. It is situated 45 kilometres (28 mi) southeast of the regional capital city of Gilgit on the Karakoram Highway. The town is situated at the junction of three major mountain ranges: the Karakoram, the Hindu Kush and the Himalayas. The confluence of the Gilgit and Indus rivers is also located nearby.

Juglot is also the junction where the roads to Gilgit and Skardu split into different directions: the road to Skardu branches off by about six kilometres towards Gilgit.

== Geography ==
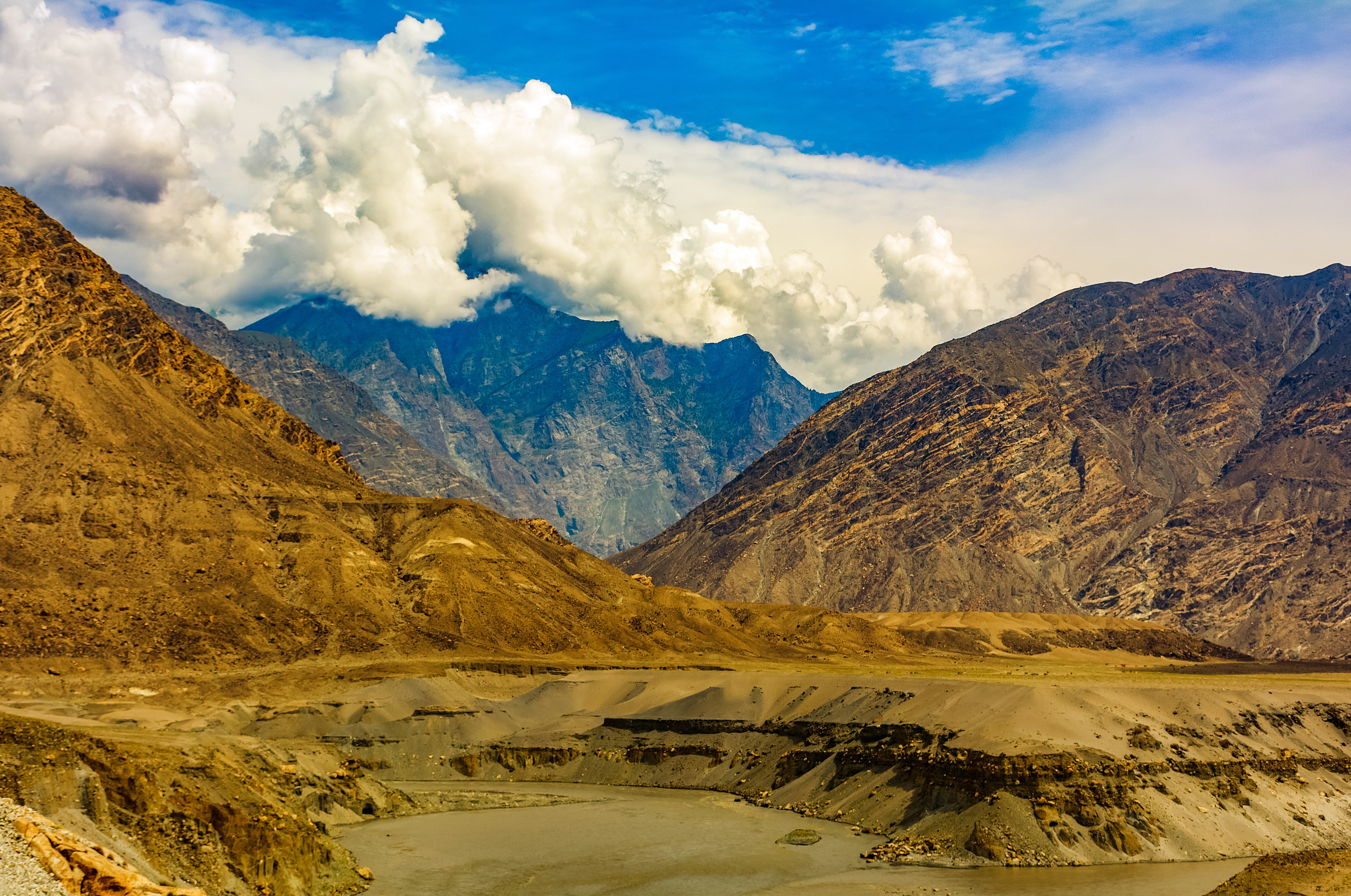
Juglot serves as the junction point between the Karakoram, Himalayas, and Hindu Kush

Jaglot is situated at the mouth of Sai Nala as it joins the Indus River on its right side. Across the Indus River on its left bank is the village of Bunji. In the 19th century, a ferry service used to run between Jaglot (then known as Sai) and Bunji, which provided the only means of communication between Gilgit and Kashmir. In 1893, a suspension bridge called the Partab Bridge was constructed upstream, which provided an easier means of communication.

Approximately three miles above the mouth of Sai Nala, another mountain torrent joins it from the left. This and the Sai Nala provide several fertile plains, on which some dozen hamlets were raised, all of which have now merged into the village of Jaglot.

== History ==
Historically, Juglot was strategically important as it lay along the route linking British Raj to China via the Kashmir region. Bunji, which served as a garrison location for the state military forces of the princely state of Jammu and Kashmir, is situated across the Indus River.

Today, Juglot serves as one of the most important logistical bases for the Pakistan Army. The town gained significance for Pakistani forces during the conflict over the Siachen Glacier, which remains the highest active battleground in the world.

== Resources ==
Juglot is located in a fertile valley with rich natural resources. The town also contains the largest oil, wheat and flour depots in the territory. It has independent power-generation facilities and sufficient electric power to attract a number of flour mills and marble plants. Artisanal gold panning in the Indus River is carried out by a tribe known as the Soniwals (gold hunters).

== Villages ==
Juglot contains fifteen villages, including:

- Damot
- Manote
- Bargin
- Chakarkot
- Gasho Pahote
- Sabil
