= Konodas =

Konodas is a small town near Gilgit city across Ghizer River. Three suspension bridges including one concrete bridge connect Konodas to the city. One among three bridges is the oldest suspension bridge from Raja-era, constructed in 1905.

Konodas links Gilgit city to Danyore, Nomal and ultimately Nalter Valley. The road connecting these towns is rebuilt and upgraded to one-way road in 2020.

== Key Locations ==
- Karakoram International University
- Aga Khan Higher Secondary School Gilgit
- PDCN

== See also ==
- Gilgit city
- KIU
