= Amen Aamir =

Pakistani pilot

- آمین عامر
- Citizenship: Pakistan
- Occupation: Pilot
- Known for: First woman pilot from Gilgit-Baltistan

Amen Aamir (Urdu: آمین عامر) is an aviator from Gilgit-Baltistan, who is the first woman from the region to qualify as a commercial pilot. Born in Skardu, she was inspired to become a pilot after a school visit to a Pakistan Air Force base. She learnt to fly at the Rawalpindi Flying Club. Her first solo flight took place on 19 December 2015. She graduated as a commercial pilot in 2017.
