= Bunji Bridge =

Bridge in Astore District of Gilgit-Baltistan

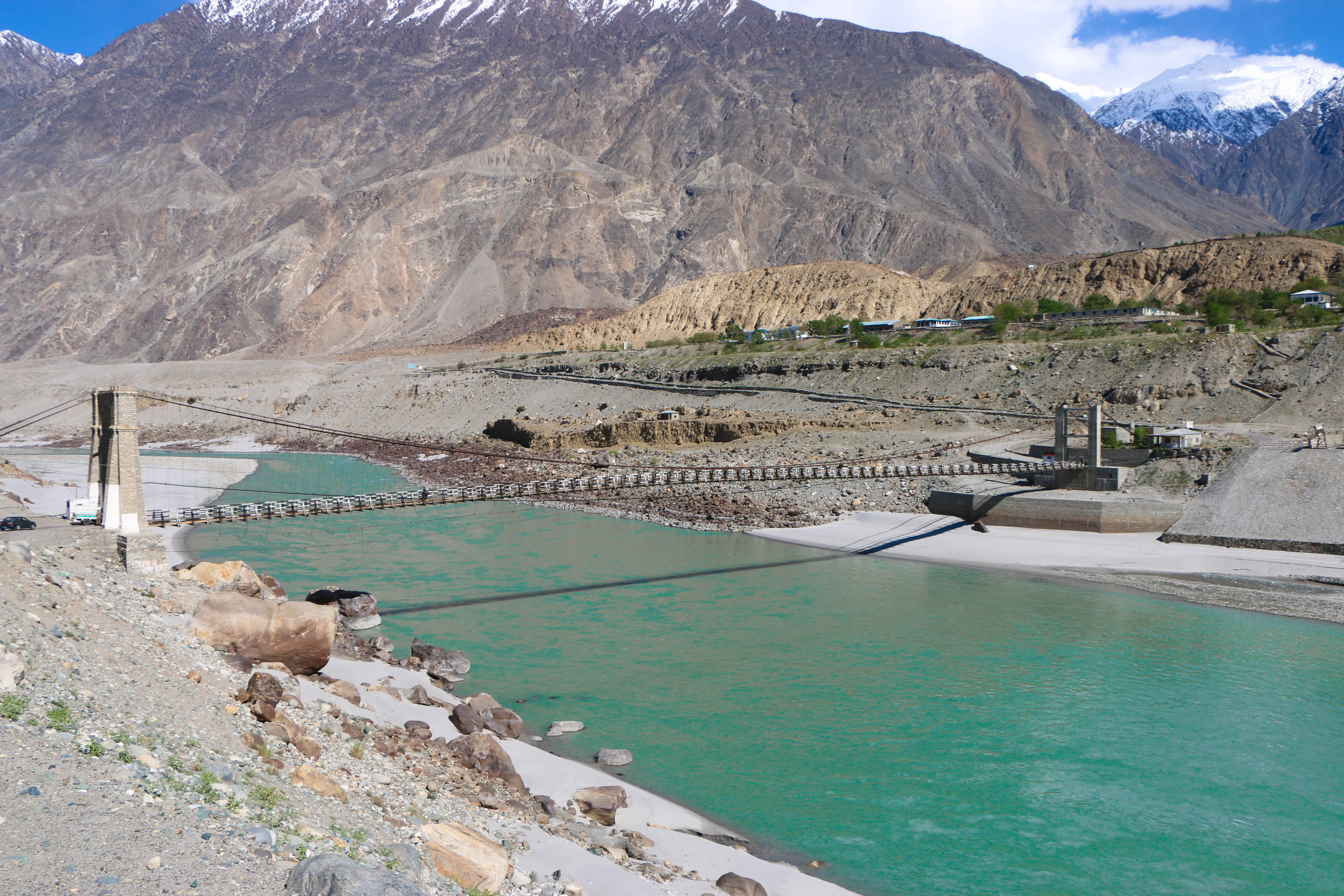
- View of the Bunji Bridge in Bunji, Pakistan
- Coordinates: 35.729781°N 74.623359°E
- Carries: Vehicles
- Crosses: Indus River
- Other name: Partab Pul
- Named for: Maharaja Pratap Singh

Characteristics
- Design: Cantilever truss
- Material: Iron - Steel
- Total length: 100 m

History
- Construction end: 1893
- Rebuilt: 2012

Location
- Interactive map of Bunji Bridge

Bunji Bridge (or Partab Pul) is a suspension bridge on the Indus River near Bunji, a town in the Astore District of Gilgit-Baltistan, Pakistan. It was first built in the 19th century by the Maharaja Pratap Singh's government of the princely state of Jammu and Kashmir. Its wooden girders were burnt down during the 1947 Gilgit Rebellion and subsequently repaired. It fell into disuse and neglect in recent decades. It was restored by the recently established Government of Gilgit-Baltistan in 2012 after the 2010 Indus floods highlighted its value. The bridge is said to serve as a vital link between the town of Gilgit and the locations in the Astore District.

== History ==
=== Construction ===
Bunji, part of the Astore district, is on the left bank of the Indus River as it flows south. The Gilgit district is on the right bank of Indus.

Prior to 1891, there was only a ferry service to cross the Indus, which ran between Bunji and Jaglot (then called 'Sai'). In that year, in preparation for the Hunza–Nagar Campaign, a flying bridge using wire rope was laid by Captain Aylmer of the Bengal Sappers and Miners. Aylmer also established a wire-rope ferry which carried hundreds of tons of grains and military stores for the campaign.

In May–June 1893, a new suspension bridge across the Indus was constructed by the Maharaja Pratap Singh's government, along with a neighbouring Ramghat Bridge across the Astore River. Steel wire ropes for the suspension were imported from England (made by Roger Bullivant). They were laced with wooden girders and attached to masonry abutments, designed to withstand strain of 744.08 kg/m. The bridge was located a few miles upstream from Bunji, just below a large "knee-bend" that is the confluence of the Gilgit and Indus rivers. It was called the "Partab Bridge" in honour of Maharaja Pratap Singh. The construction was carried out by Captain J. E. Capper of the Corps of Royal Engineers.

The bridge was the only means of contacting Gilgit during the summer months when the ferry would be unsafe due to the heavy summer flows of the Indus.

=== 1947 Gilgit Rebellion ===
The Pratab bridge was burnt down during the 1947 Gilgit Rebellion, on the night of 2 November 1947 by Platoon number 7 of the Chilas Scouts, in order to block the passage of the State Forces stationed at Bunji. Scholar Ahmad Hasan Dani deems a local rajah—Muzaffaruddin to have given the order for this action (along with the destruction of a parallel ferry route), which eventually proved to be an important event in the chronicles of the Gilgit Rebellion.

The Scouts soldier that burnt the bridge, Naqibullah, displays a certificate given by the rebel leader Captain Mirza Hassan Khan for his valour. However, immediately after the event, Khan believed that Major William Brown of the Gilgit Scouts had ordered the burning so as to block his own rebel forces from reaching Bunji. Hassan Khan appointed himself as the commander-in-chief of the "Republic of Gilgit" and wanted to conquer all of the Gilgit wazarat, whereas Brown was likely satisfied with liberating just the Gilgit Agency. But Khan did march into Bunji crossing the Indus by rafts, and the State Forces stationed there were neutralised by 5 November.

On 6 November 1947, a call for repairs of the bridge was dispatched to local engineers. It was not until late February 1948 that the bridge was repaired, following which the Gilgit Scouts proceeded to lay the siege of Skardu.

=== 2000s ===
Since around 2000, the bridge fell into increasing neglect and disuse, in favour of a new wider bridge, which was built joining Jaglot with Bunji, along a new alignment (at coordinates 35.665866°N 74.627944°E).

The new bridge was destroyed during the 2010 flooding of the Indus River. Following demands from the local populace, the Partab Bridge was restored in early 2012. The washed-away bridge is also reported to have been repaired at a cost of about Rs. 18 million. The first Chief Minister of Gilgit-Baltistan, Syed Mehdi Shah reopened it in November 2012.

== See also ==
- Jammu–Sialkot line, constructed during the Maharaja Pratap Singh's reign

== Bibliography ==
- Dani, Ahmad Hasan (2001), History of Northern Areas of Pakistan: Upto 2000 A.D., Sang-e-Meel Publications, ISBN 978-969-35-1231-1
