= Bunji, Pakistan =

City in Gilgit Baltistan, Pakistan

Bunji
- Town
- Bunji
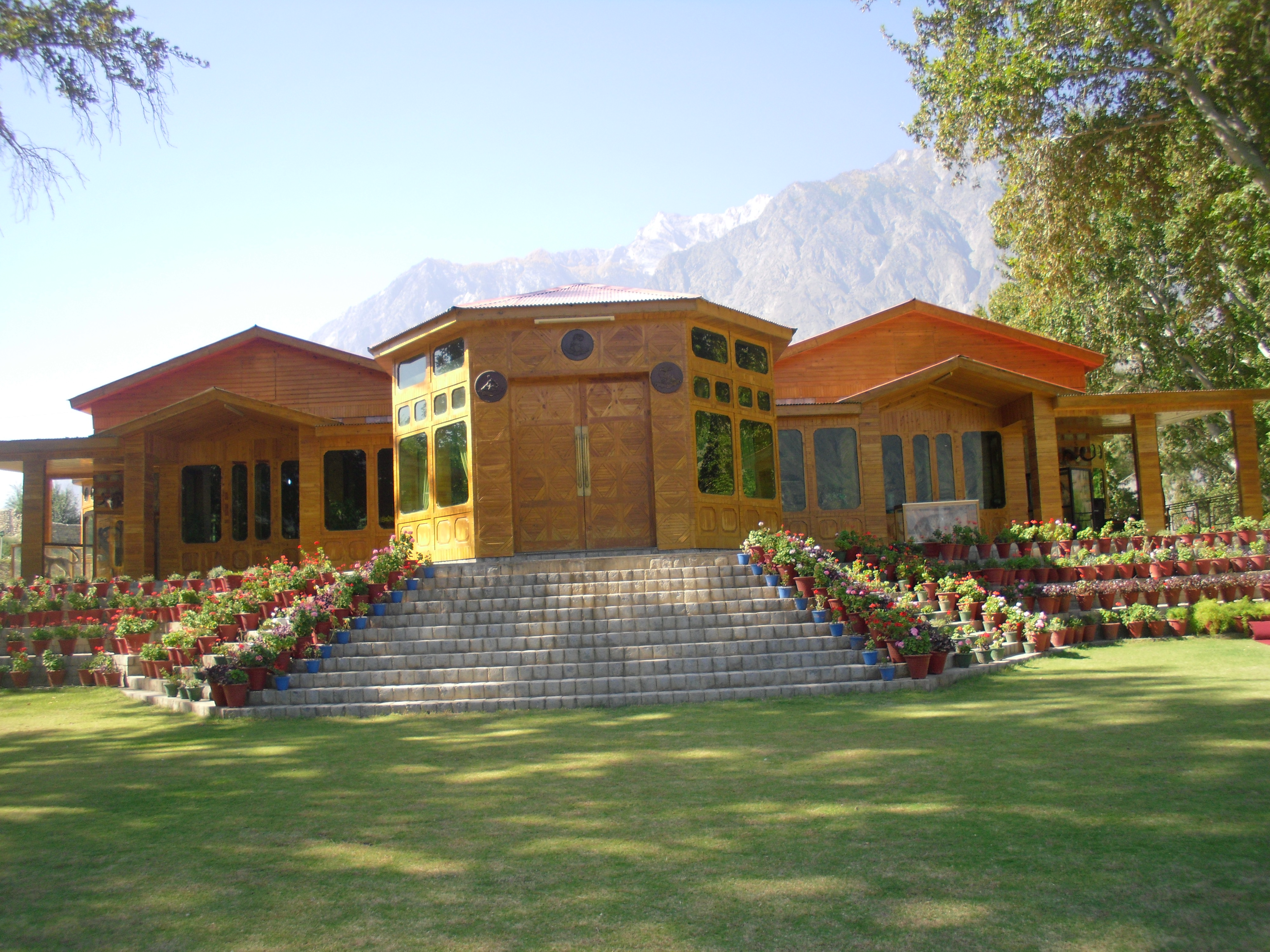
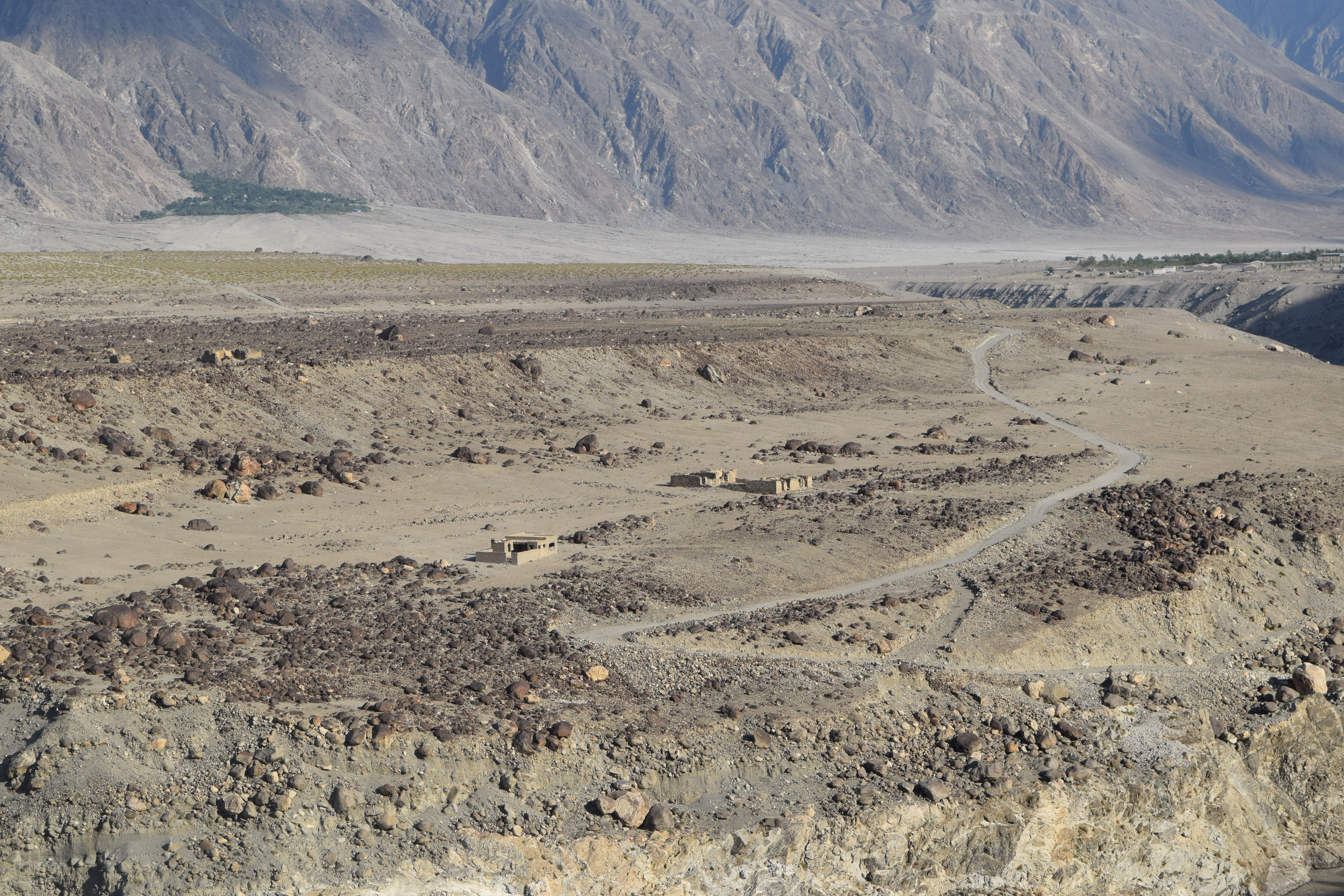
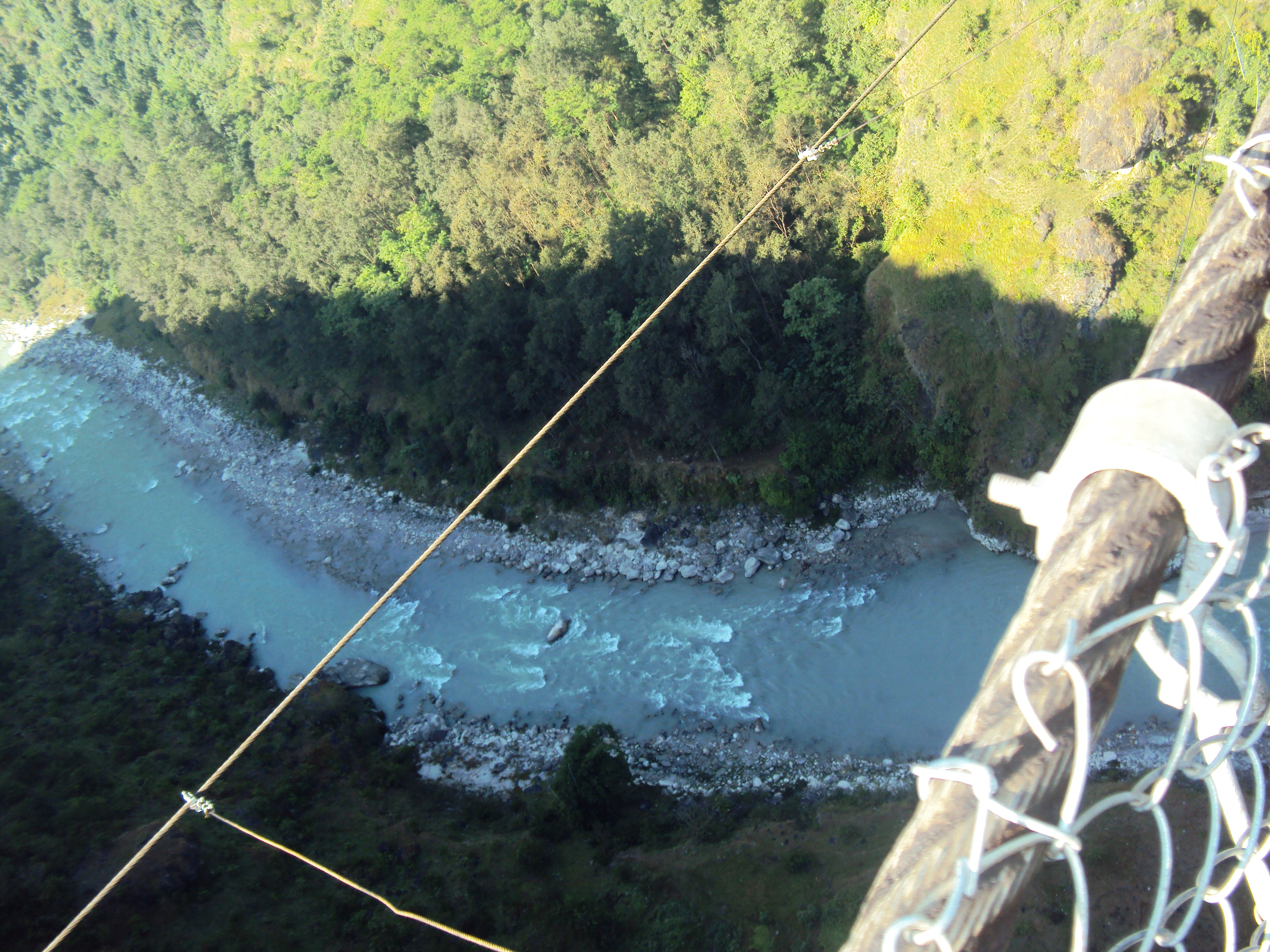
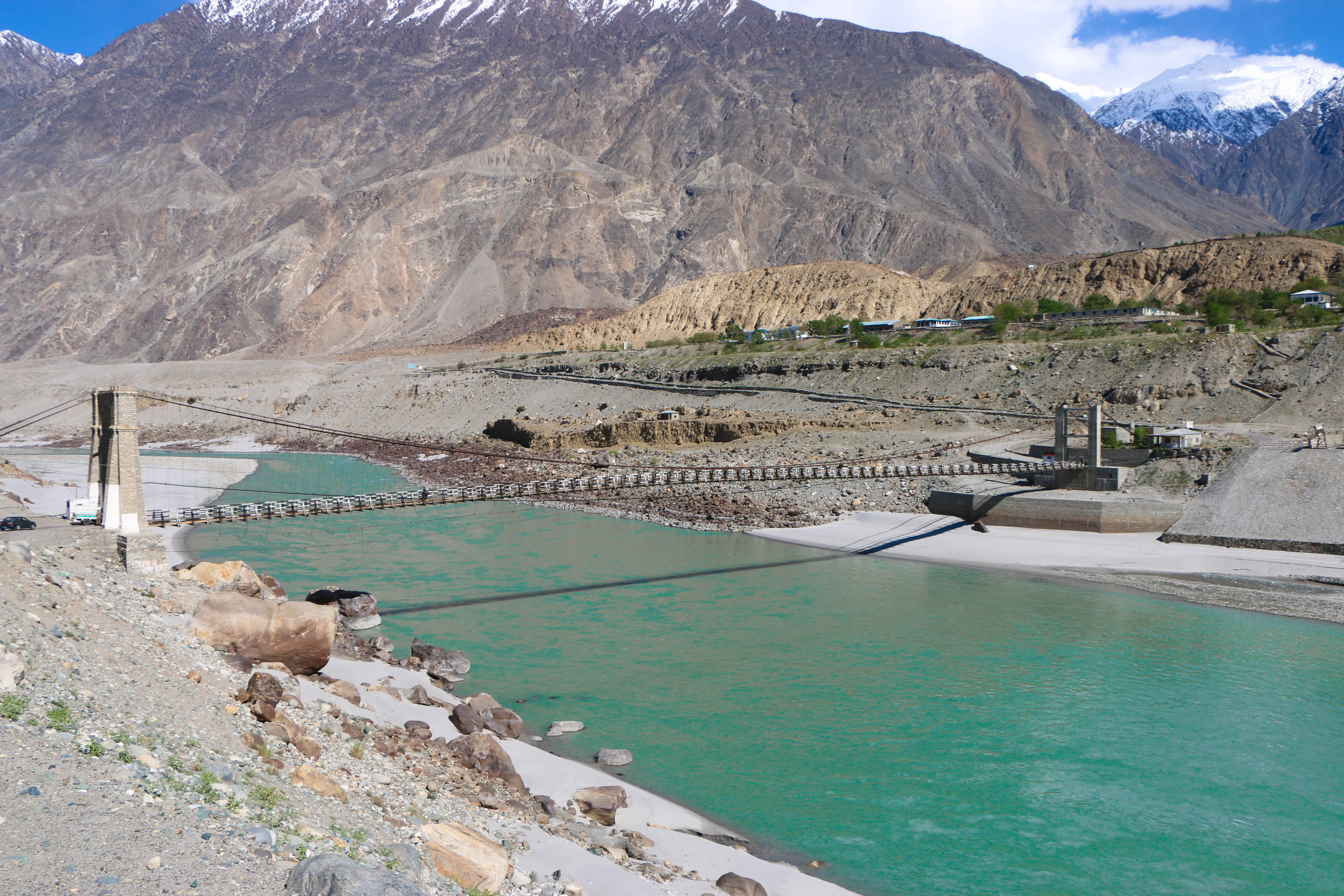
- Top left to right: Bunji Mess, Old Road, Bunji Gah and Bunji Bridge

- Location within Gilgit Baltistan Location within Pakistan
- Coordinates: 35°38′32″N 74°38′01″E
- Country: Pakistan
- Region: (Gilgit-Baltistan) Gilgit Baltistan
- District: Astore District

Population (1998)
  - Total: 10,000
- Time zone: UTC+5:00 (PST)

Bunji (Urdu:بنجی) is a town in Astore District of Gilgit-Baltistan region in Pakistan. The distance from Bunji to Gilgit is about 50 kilometres (31 mi) via the Karakoram Highway. Located at the confluence of Indus River with Astore River, Bunji was historically important, being an economic hub for barter trade between Yaghistan and Dogras.

== History ==
The town was earlier known as Bawanji. It is in the Astore Valley, which came under the control of Skardu (Baltistan) during the rule of Ali Sher Khan Anchan (r. 1540–1633).

The 19th century geographer Frederic Drew states that Bunji had significant agriculture and horticulture at this time. But it was laid "waste" during the invasions of Sulaiman Shah (ruler of Yasin, c. 1800–1825), after which only a small area was cultivated.

General Zorawar Singh, the governor of Kishtwar under Raja Gulab Singh, conquered Skardu in 1840, and sent his forces to occupy Rondu and Astor. Raja Jabbar Khan of Astor eventually surrendered and was sent to Zorawar Singh. However, the Sikh governor of Kashmir, Ghulam Mohiuddin, contested Zorawar Singh's claim. He retrieved control of Astor and reinstated Jabbar Khan as his subsidiary.

After the Dogras established the princely state of Jammu and Kashmir under British suzerainty (1846), they built a fort at Bunji and stationed troops there. Bunji was regarded as a strategic point on the road from Srinagar to Gilgit. In the early years of Dogra rule, Gilgit was repeatedly invaded by Raja Gauhar Rehman of Punial and Bunji troops became involved in the conflicts. The frontier states were subdued only after the British established the Gilgit Agency in 1889.

Until 1935, Bunji was part of the Astore tehsil of the Gilgit wazarat. After that date, the British leased the Gilgit tehsil to the north of Indus as the Gilgit leased area, and Astore became an independent wazarat administered as part of the Kashmir province of the state.

Shortly before the partition of India in 1947, the British transferred the Gilgit Agency to the Maharaja of Jammu and Kashmir. The 6th battalion of Jammu and Kashmir State Forces was sent to Bunji to support the Gilgit Agency (which had its own forces in the form of the Gilgit Scouts). The Muslim troops of the state force battalion, under the leadership of Mirza Hassan Khan, joined the rebellion raised by the Gilgit Scouts on 1 November 1947. Subsequently Bunji was attacked by the Gilgit Scouts and all the non-Muslims of the battalion were taken prisoner. Some of the non-Muslim forces escaped to Skardu where they held out till August 1948.

== Geography ==
=== Climate ===
Bunji has a cool arid climate (Köppen BWk), typical for Gilgit-Baltistan valleys though hotter than almost all other such localities.

The annual temperature averages 16.2 °C or 61.2 °F. In a year, the average rainfall is 190 millimetres or 7.5 inches. The hottest month is July and January is the coldest month of the year in Bunji. The driest month is November with 4 millimetres or 0.16 inches of precipitation. In May, precipitation reaches its highest peak at an average of 34 millimetres or 1.3 inches.

Climate data for Bunji
| Month | Jan | Feb | Mar | Apr | May | Jun | Jul | Aug | Sep | Oct | Nov | Dec | Year |
|---|---|---|---|---|---|---|---|---|---|---|---|---|---|
| Mean daily maximum °C (°F) | 8 (46) | 11.2 (52.2) | 16.7 (62.1) | 22.5 (72.5) | 27.7 (81.9) | 32.7 (90.9) | 34.4 (93.9) | 33.4 (92.1) | 29.4 (84.9) | 23.5 (74.3) | 17 (63) | 10.3 (50.5) | 22.2 (72.0) |
| Mean daily minimum °C (°F) | −0.7 (30.7) | 1.5 (34.7) | 6.2 (43.2) | 10.8 (51.4) | 14.5 (58.1) | 18.5 (65.3) | 21.3 (70.3) | 20.9 (69.6) | 16.2 (61.2) | 10 (50) | 4.1 (39.4) | 0.7 (33.3) | 10.3 (50.6) |
| Average precipitation mm (inches) | 9 (0.4) | 15 (0.6) | 28 (1.1) | 32 (1.3) | 34 (1.3) | 8 (0.3) | 15 (0.6) | 16 (0.6) | 9 (0.4) | 13 (0.5) | 4 (0.2) | 7 (0.3) | 190 (7.6) |

== Tourism ==
Bunji is a tourist destination in Pakistan. It has the historic Bunji Mess and the Bunji Bridge.

== Bunji Hydropower Project ==
BHPP is a sub project of Pakistan with a planned capacity of 7100 MW, if constructed. Currently, this project is undergoing a feasibility study and detailed design. The companies conducting the feasibility and detailed design studies are involved in a joint venture, consisted of Mott MacDonald UK, Mott MacDonald Pakistan, Sogreah Consultants (France), Nippon Koei (Japan) and Development & Management consultants (Pakistan). This joint venture is known as Bunji Consultants Joint Venture (BCJV).

The dam site area is located 83 km (52 mi) from Gilgit on Skardu road near Asmani Mor. The proposed powerhouse is located in the Bunji village.

== See also ==
- Karakoram Highway
- Gorikot
