= Baltistan Highway =

Highway in Pakistan

- S-1; Juglot–Skardu Road

Route information
- Maintained by National Highway Authority
- Length: 167 km (104 mi)
- Existed: 1982–present

Major junctions
- West end: Juglot
- East end: Skardu

Location
- Country: Pakistan

Highway system
- Roads in Pakistan

The Baltistan Highway (Urdu: شاہراہِ بلتستان) or Strategic Highway 1 (S-1), also known as the Juglot–Skardu Road (Urdu: جگلوٹ–سکردو روڈ), is a 167-kilometre-long (104 mi) highway in Pakistan that links the cities of Gilgit and Skardu in Gilgit-Baltistan. Constructed by the Pakistan Army Corps of Engineers from 1970 to 1982, it is maintained by National Highway Authority.

== Route ==
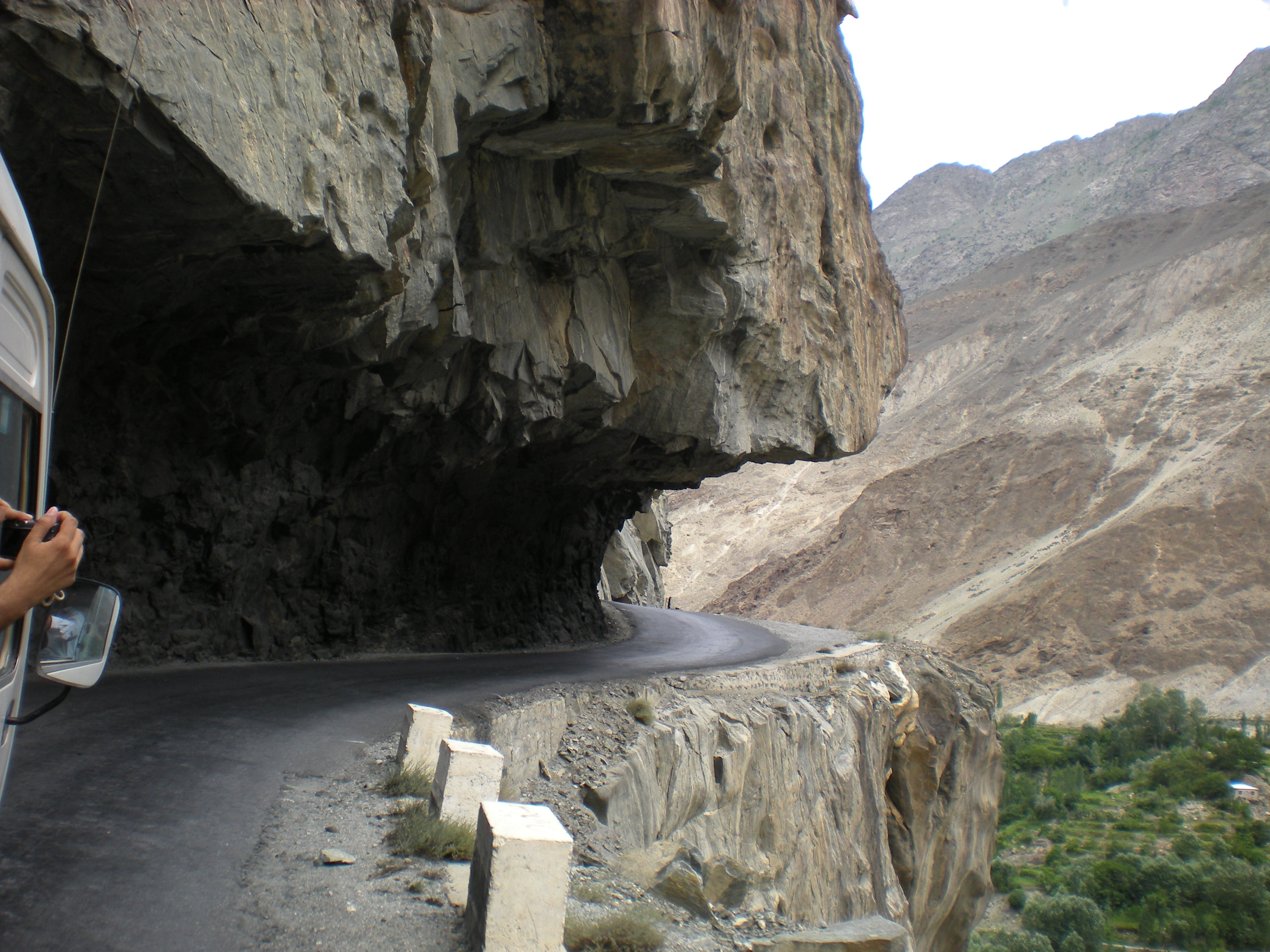
A portion of S-1 in 2012

The highway begins south of Gilgit on the Karakoram Highway, near Juglot, and extends eastward towards Skardu. It was upgraded and paved by the Frontier Works Organization in 2021. Total travel time between Gilgit and Skardu is around 4 hours.

The highway can be blocked for a period of time depending on conditions (such as snowfall and avalanches). It ends in Skardu, the capital of Skardu District and Baltistan Division, at an elevation of 2,226 m (7,303 ft) above the sea level.

== Strategic importance ==
The Baltistan highway is of strategic and economic significance, as supplies from markets in KP and Punjab, as well as from markets in Gilgit city, go to Baltistan through this route. It is the only major route connecting Baltistan with the rest of country, and so nearly a million people depend over it for essential items. It is also important for the defence of the country, being a supply route for border regions including near to Kargil, Siachen, Batalik and Chorbat. Pakistan Army's soldiers man these border areas round the clock, throughout the year.

== Upgrades ==
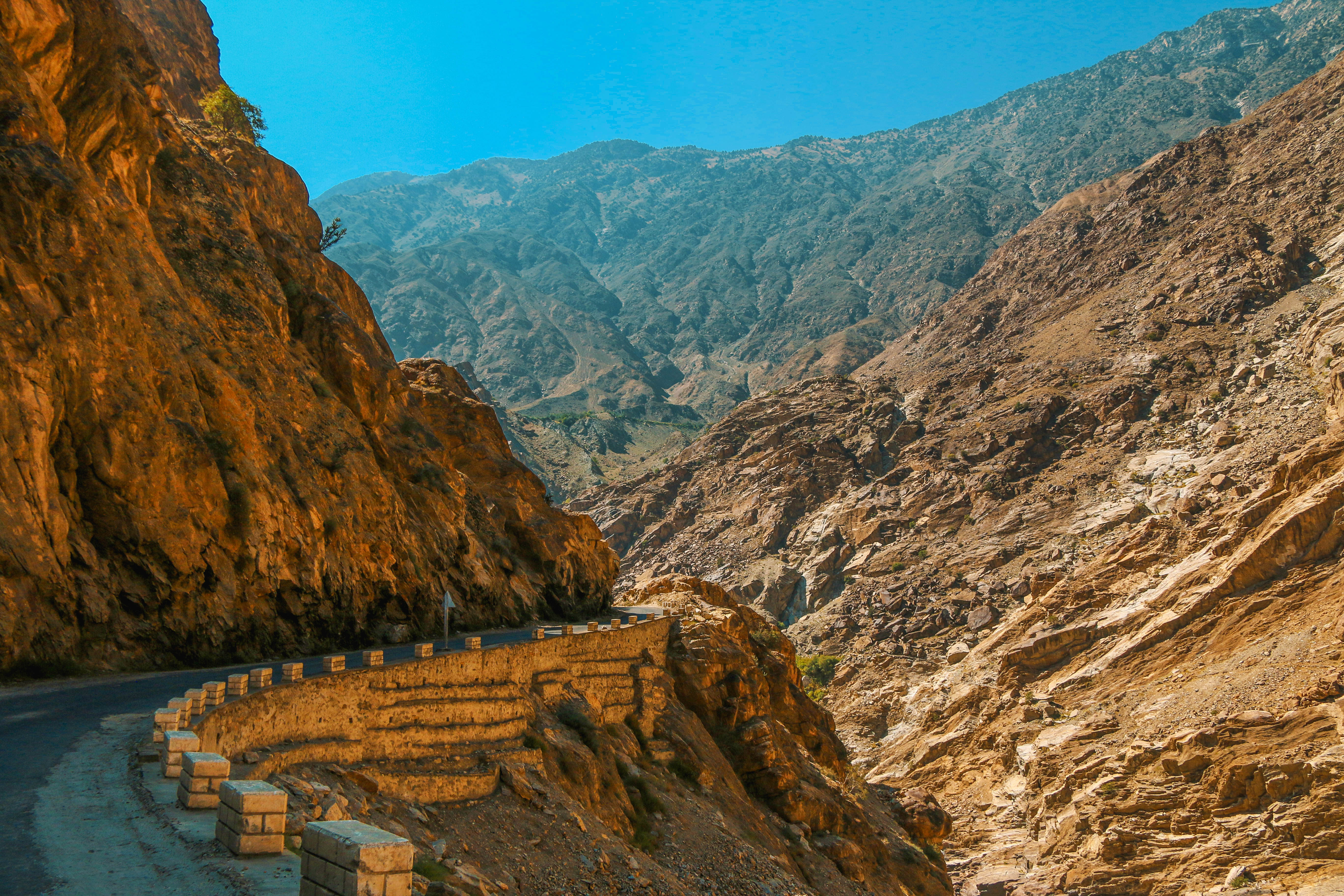
A view of the Baltistan Highway in 2016

Successive Pakistani governments promised to renovate the road since 2009, but work was continuously delayed. It was not until 2017 that work finally started on this important project. It cost Rs. 31 billion, and took four years to complete. On December 16, 2021, the upgraded road was inaugurated by Prime Minister Imran Khan. The road has now been increased in width from 3.6 meters to 7.3 meters to allow a better and smooth flow of traffic. Moreover, the time it earlier took to reach Skardu from Gilgit was about 10 hours, which will now be reduced to four hours. However, the road project has been completed without tunnels and alignments which were initially part of the upgrade plan designed by the Frontier Works Organisation (FWO). Thus, the uncertainty of closure of the road due to landslides still exists.

== See also ==
- National Highways of Pakistan
