= University of Baltistan =

University established by the government of Pakistan

- Former name: Karakoram International University Skardu Campus
- Type: Educational Institution
- Established: 25 August 2017; 9 years ago
- Academic affiliations: Higher Education Commission
- Chancellor: President of Pakistan
- Vice-Chancellor: Dr. Masood Akhtar
- Registrar: Dr. Mir Alam
- Students: 2,300
- Undergraduates: 1,800
- Postgraduates: 200
- Location: Skardu, Gilgit-Baltistan, Pakistan; 35.299167°N 75.704389°E
- Campus: Urban
- Language: English
- Colours: Green, Golden
- Nickname: UOBS
- Website: uobs.edu.pk

The University of Baltistan or Baltistan University (UOBS) is an international level university in Skardu, Gilgit-Baltistan, Pakistan. It was established in 2017 with a charter by the Federal Government of Pakistan, with the goal of improving access to higher education for the people of Gilgit-Baltistan.

There are seven departments: Computer Sciences, Biological Sciences, Mathematics, Chemistry, Business Management, Educational Development, and Language and Cultural Studies.

== History ==
According to its charter, University of Baltistan is a multi-campus university. Additional campuses are seeking to be established in wherever feasible.

== Administration ==
- Vice Chancellor: Prof. Dr. Masood Akhtar
- Registrar: Dr. Mir Alam

== Degrees and programs ==
- Master in Business Management-MBA
- Master in Educational Development-MA Education
- Master in Languages & Cultural Studies-MA English
- Bachelor of Science in Computer Science BSCS
- Bachelor of Business Administration-BBA
- Bachelor of Arts in English (BA Hons)
- Bachelor of Science in Chemistry (BS)
- Bachelor of Science in Biology (Zoology) (BS)
- Bachelor of Science in Biology (Botany) (BS)
- Bachelor of Science in Mathematics (BS)
- Bachelor of Science in Computer Science (BS)
- Bachelor of Science in Software Engineering (BS)
- Bachelor of Science in Artificial intelligence (BS)
- Tourism and Hospitality Management (Certificate Programs)

It was also announced that Chinese lessons would be offered in order to increase trade ties with China.

== Campuses ==
The university operates across multiple facilities in the region, including its main campus in Skardu and the Hussainabad Campus located on the Skardu-Kargil Road

== See also ==
- Karakoram International University
- University of Karachi
- University of the Punjab
- University of Peshawar
- University of Gujrat
