= Skardu =

City in Gilgit-Baltistan, Pakistan-administered Kashmir

Skardu: سکردو; སྐར་མདོ
- City
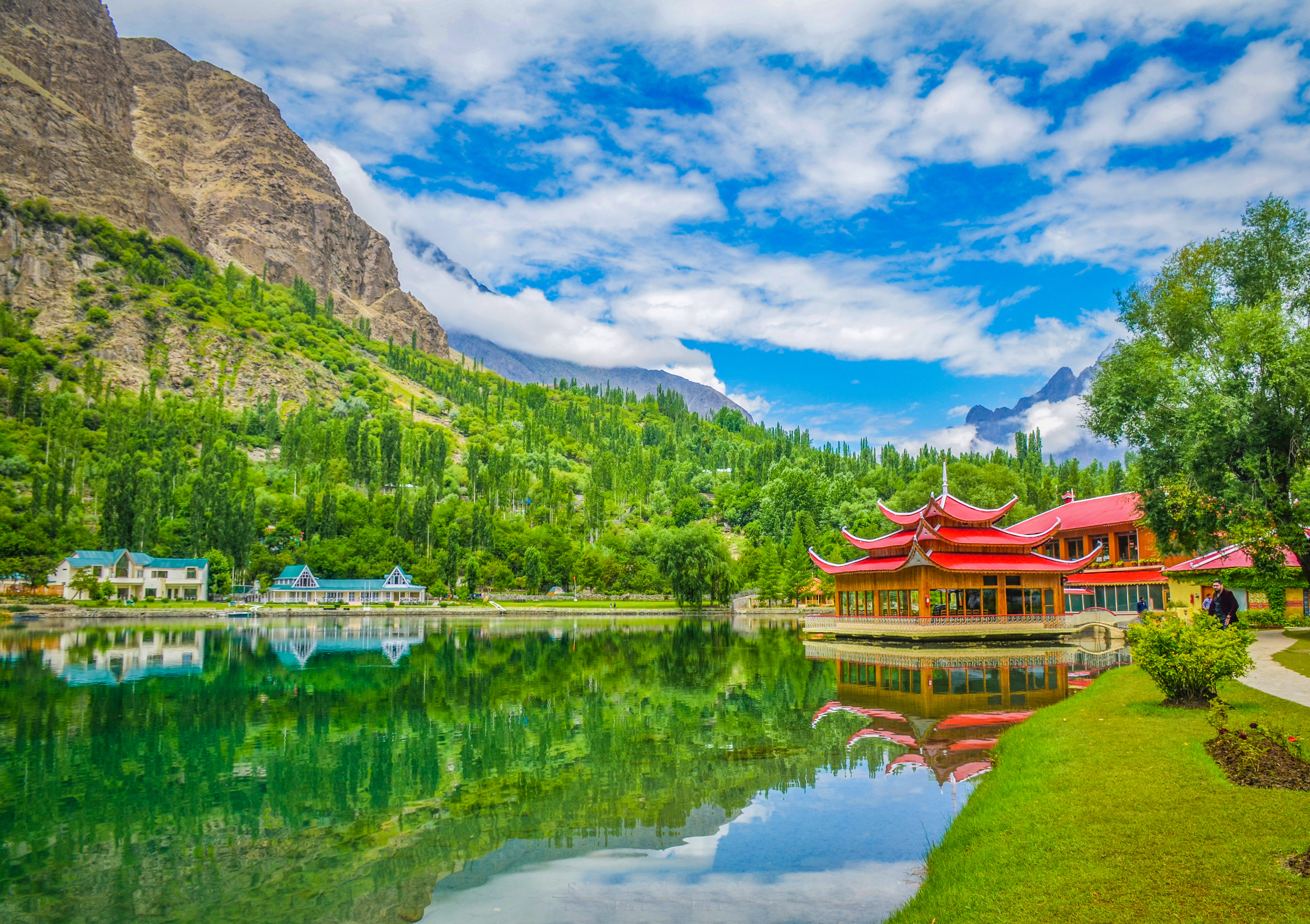
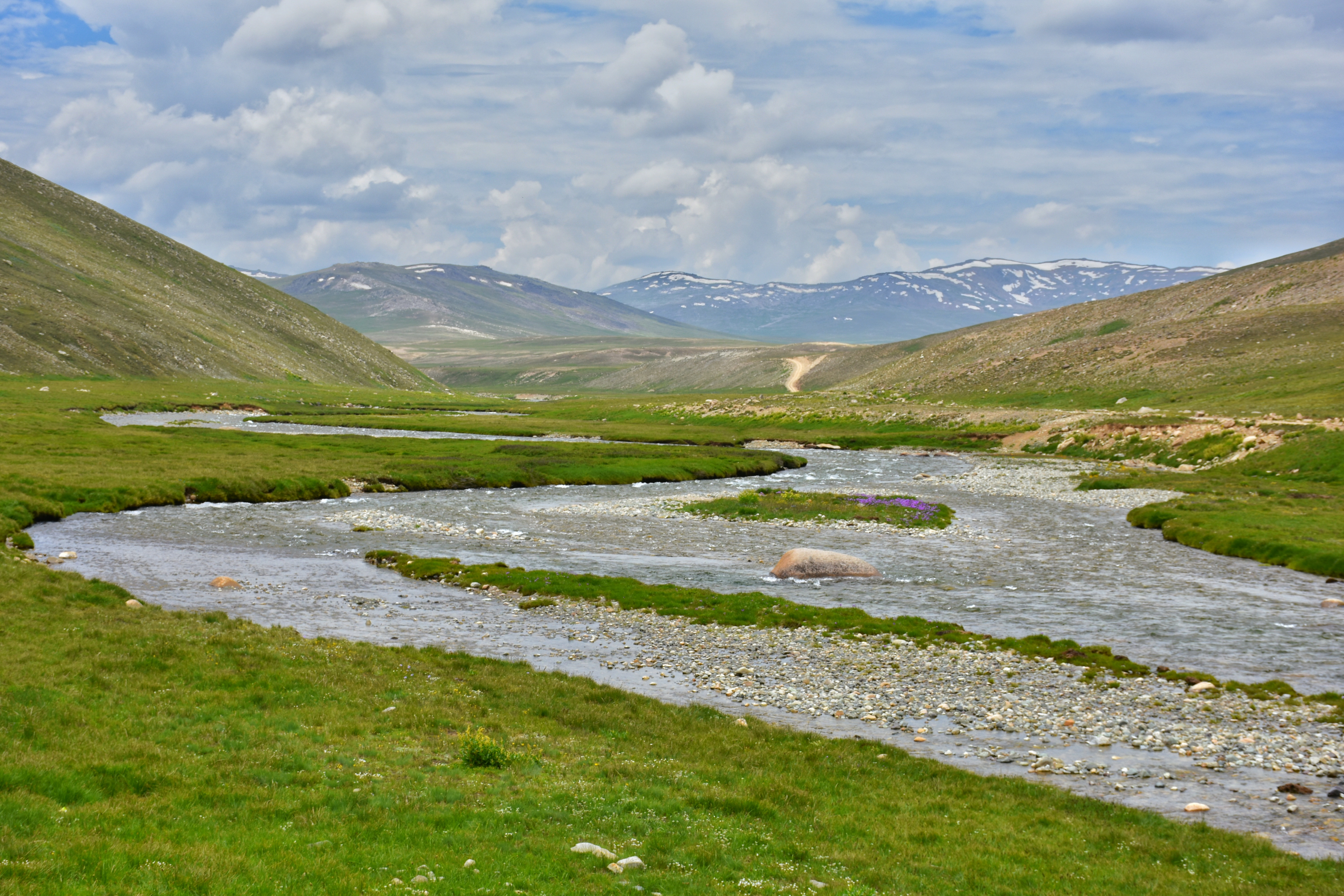
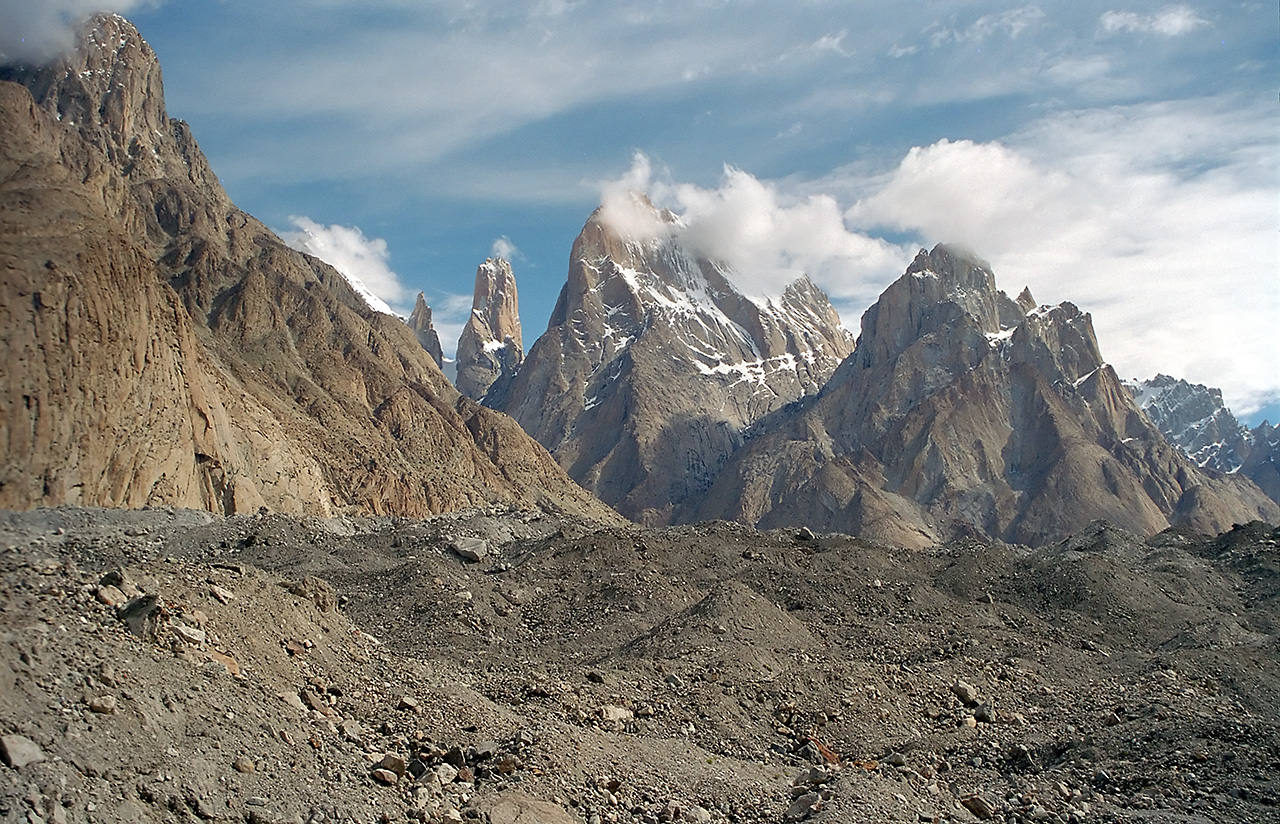
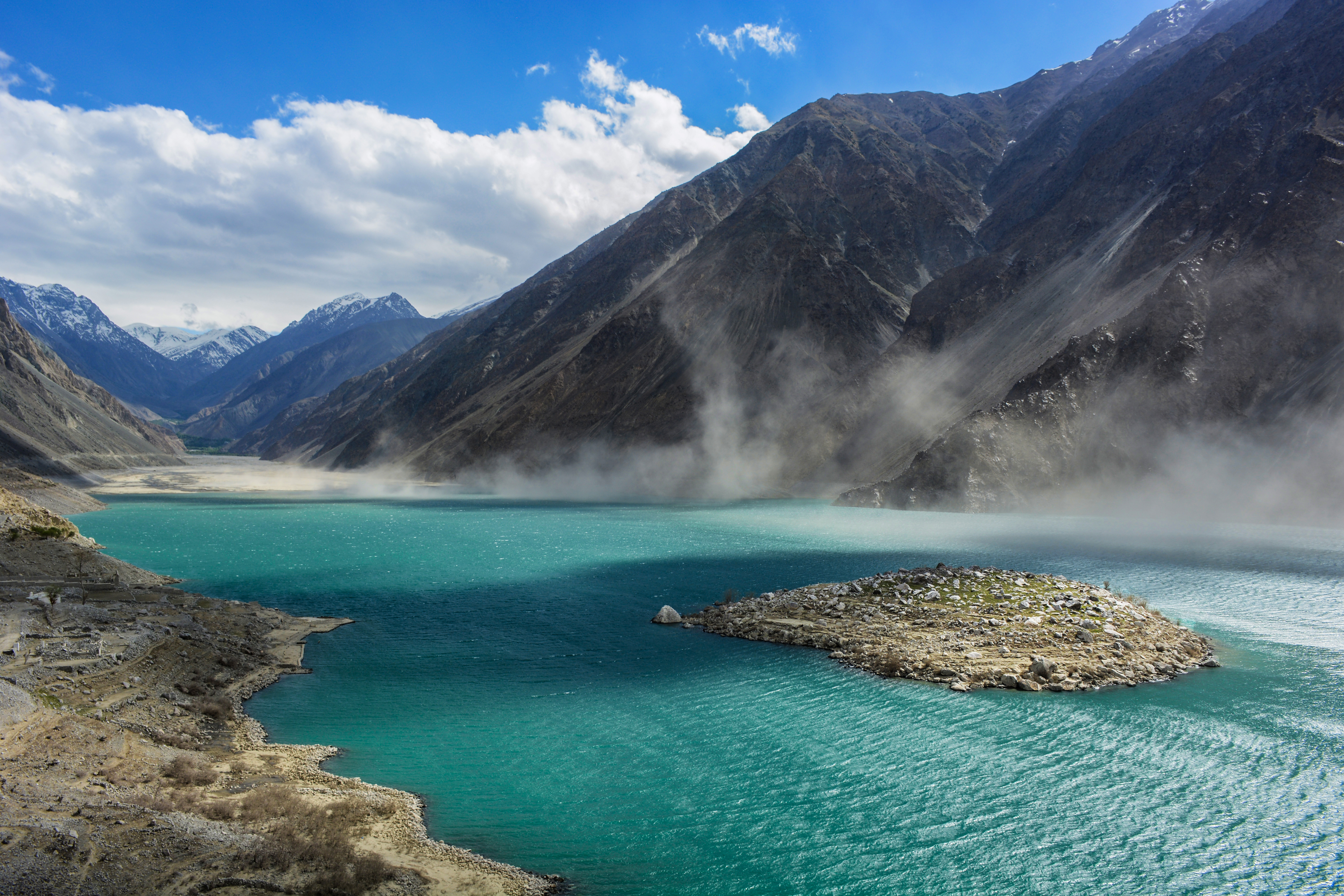
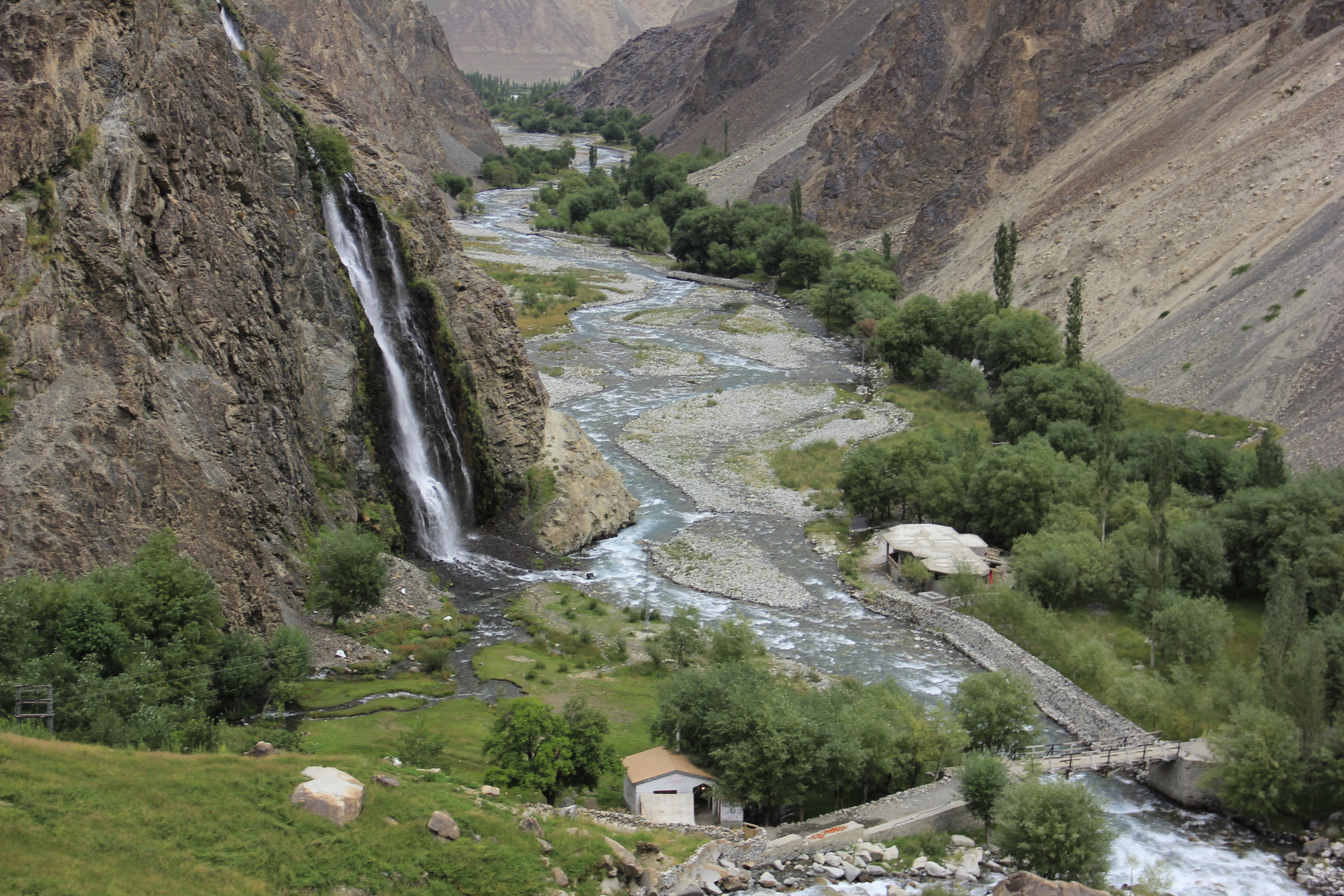
- Top left to right: Shangrila Resort, Deosai National Park, Trango Towers, Satpara Lake, and Manthokha Waterfall
- Interactive map of Skardu
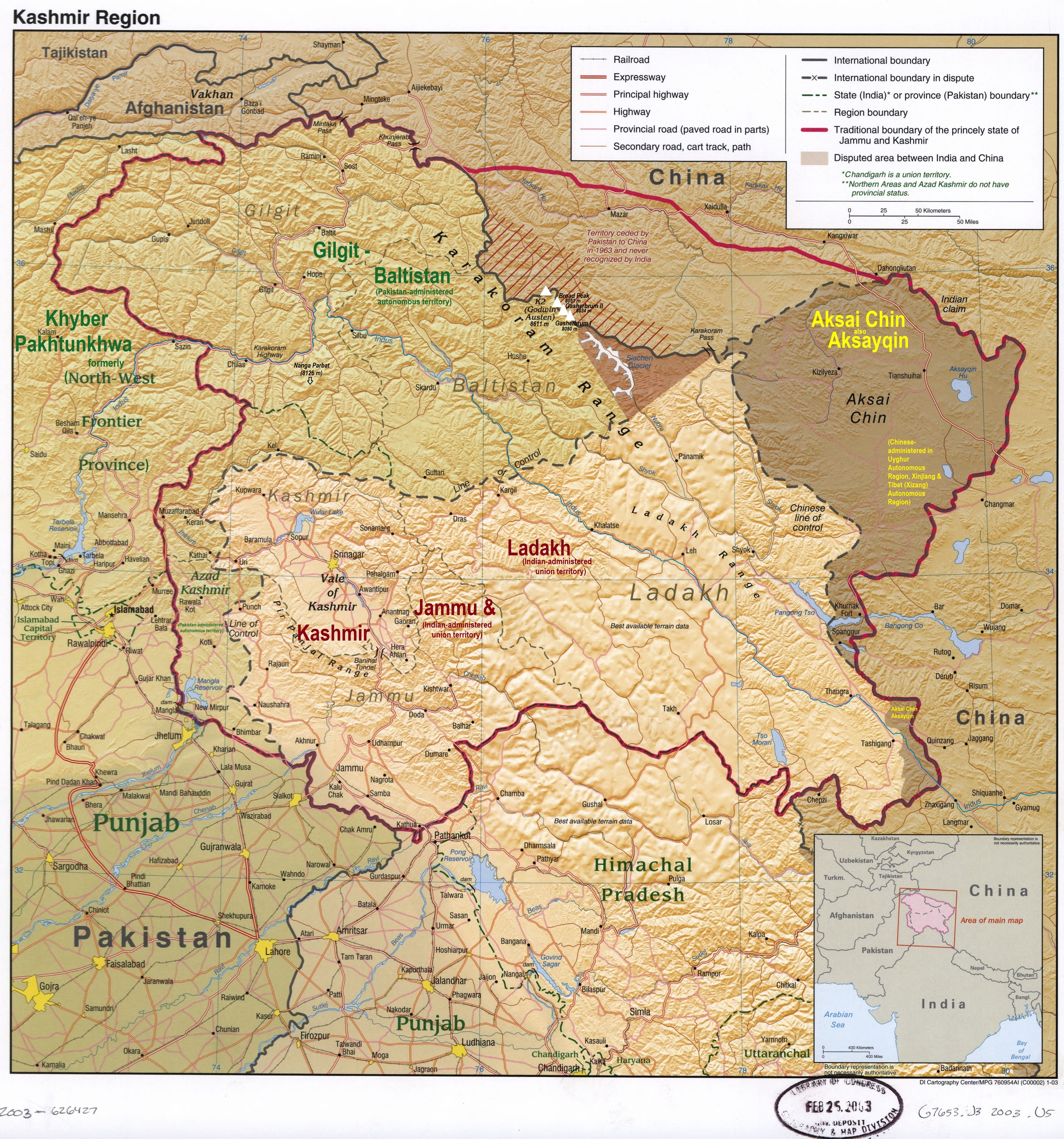
- A map showing Pakistan-administered Gilgit-Baltistan shaded in sage green in the disputed Kashmir region

- Location of Skardu Skardu (Pakistan)
- Coordinates: 35°17′25″N 75°38′40″E
- Administering country: Pakistan
- Territory: Gilgit-Baltistan
- District: Skardu

Government
  - Type: Divisional Administration
  - Commissioner: Shuja Alam (PAS)
  - Deputy Inspector General (DIG): Cap. (R) Liaquat Ali Malik (PSP)

Area
  - Total: 77 km^{2} (30 sq mi)
- Elevation: 2,228 m (7,310 ft)

Population (2021)
  - Total: 112,996
- Time zone: UTC+5:00 (PKT)
- Website: gilgitbaltistan.gov.pk

Skardu (Urdu: سکردو, romanised: skardū, Balti: སྐར་མདོ, pronounced [skərduː]) is a city located in Pakistan-administered Gilgit-Baltistan in the disputed Kashmir region. Skardu serves as the capital of Skardu District and the Baltistan Division. It is situated at an average elevation of nearly 2,500 metres (8,202 feet) above sea level in the Skardu Valley, at the confluence of the Indus and Shigar rivers.

Skardu is an important gateway to the eight-thousanders of the nearby Karakoram mountain range. The Indus River running through the region separates the Karakoram from the Ladakh Range.

== Etymology ==
The name "Skardu" is believed to be derived from the Balti word meaning "a lowland between two high places." The two referenced "high places" are Shigar city and the high-altitude Satpara Lake. (Note: Local people might tend to write the name as སྐར་དོ་ according to how they pronounce it. But the meaning of which, as stated above, corresponds to the Tibetan word མདོ. In the course of the history of Balti language, bilabial sound /m/ as a prefix has been lost, and the vowel /o/ has turned into /u/, the same as many other dialects of Tibetan.)

The earliest mention of Skardu dates to the first half of the 16th century. Mirza Haidar (1499–1551) described Askardu in his Tarikh-i-Rashidi as a district of Baltistan. The first reference to Skardu in European literature was made by Frenchman François Bernier (1625–1688), who mentioned the city by the name of Eskerdou. Afterwards, Skardu was quickly included into Asian maps produced in Europe, and was first mentioned as Eskerdow in the map Indiae orientalis nec non insularum adiacentium nova descriptio, published by the Dutch engraver Nicolaes Visscher II between 1680 and 1700.

== Location ==
Map including Skardu (DMA, 1986)

The Skardu Valley is located approximately 180 kilometers off the main Karakoram Highway, linked to it via the Baltistan Highway. At the confluence of the Indus and Shigar Rivers, the valley is 10 kilometres (6 miles) wide and 40 kilometres (25 miles) long. Active erosion in the nearby Karakoram Mountains has resulted in enormous deposits of sediment throughout the Skardu Valley. Glaciers from the Indus and Shigar valleys broadened the Skardu Valley between 3.2 million years ago up to the Holocene approximately 11,700 years ago as scientists estimate.

== History ==
=== Early history ===
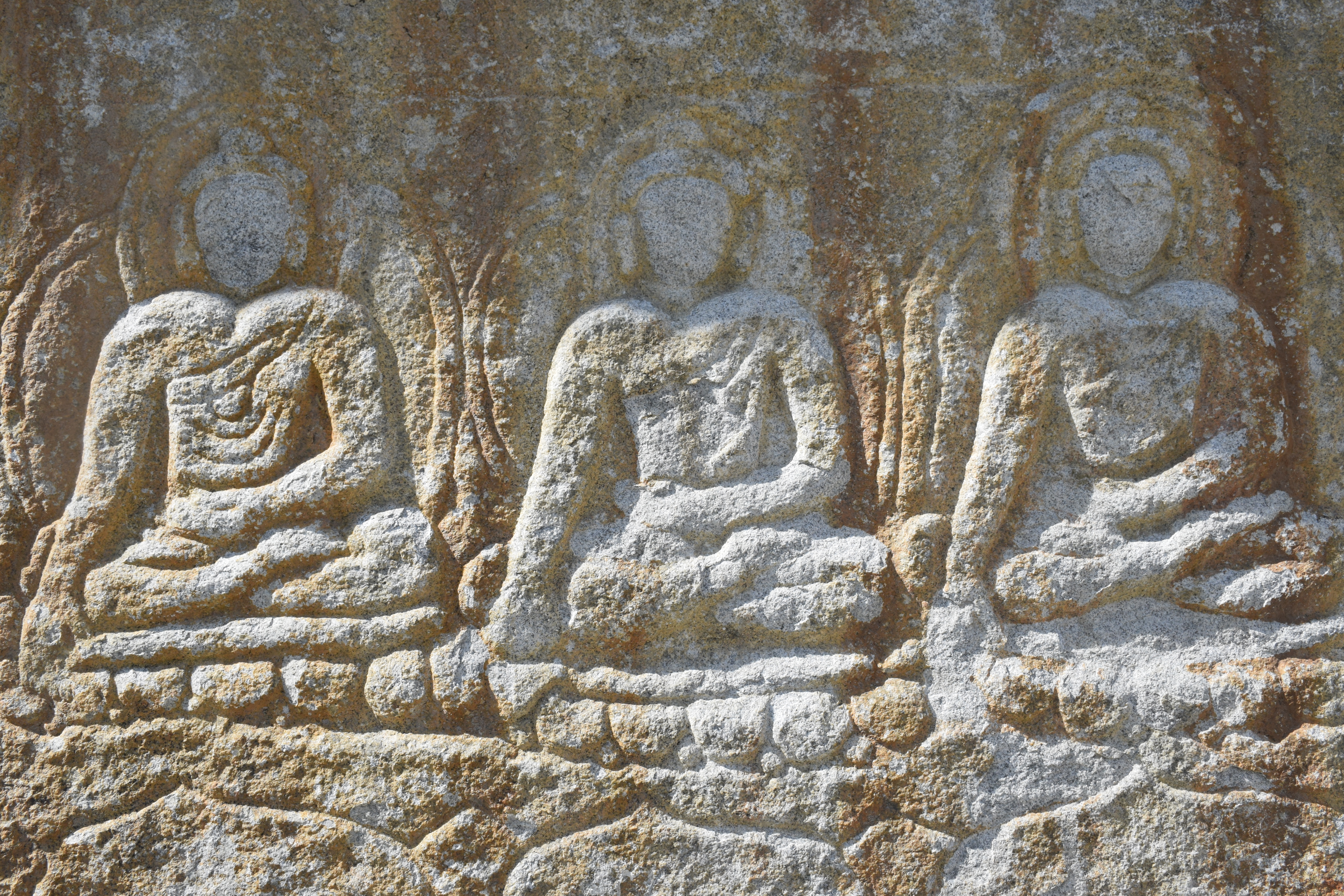
The Manthal Buddha Rock dates from the era when the region's population was Buddhist.

The Skardu Valley has been a part of the cultural sphere of Buddhist Tibet since as early as the founding of the Tibetan Empire under Songtsen Gampo in the mid– 7th century CE evidence of past prevalence of tantric Buddhism, in the form of Tibetan inscriptions is found across Baltistan. Given the region's close proximity, Skardu has remained in contact with tribes near Kashgar, in what is now the westernmost Xinjiang province of China.

=== Medieval history ===
Following the dissolution of Tibetan suzerainty over Baltistan around the 9th–10th century CE, the region came under the control of the Maqpon dynasty; the Maqpon dynasty based in Skardu ruled over Baltistan for around 700 years.

Around the year 1500, Maqpon Bokha was crowned ruler and founded the city of Skardu as his capital. Skardu Fort was established around this time. During his reign, Maqpon Bokha imported craftsmen to Skardu from Kashmir and Chilas to help develop the local economy. While nearby Gilgit fell out of the orbit of Tibetan influence, Baltistan remained connected due to its close proximity to Ladakh, the region against which Skardu and neighbouring Khaplu routinely fought.

In the 14th century, Muslim scholars from Central Asia and Iran crossed Baltistan's mountains to spread Islam. According to Balti traditions, both Hamdani and Nurbakhsh visited the region. The Noorbakhshia Sufi order further propagated the faith in Baltistan, notably due to the missionary efforts of Mir Shams-ud-Din Araqi, and Islam became dominant by the end of the 17th century. With the passage of time, a majority also converted to Shi'a Islam, while a few converted to Sunni Islam. Sikhs traditionally believe that Guru Nanak, the founder of Sikhism, visited Skardu during his second udasi journey between 1510 and 1515.

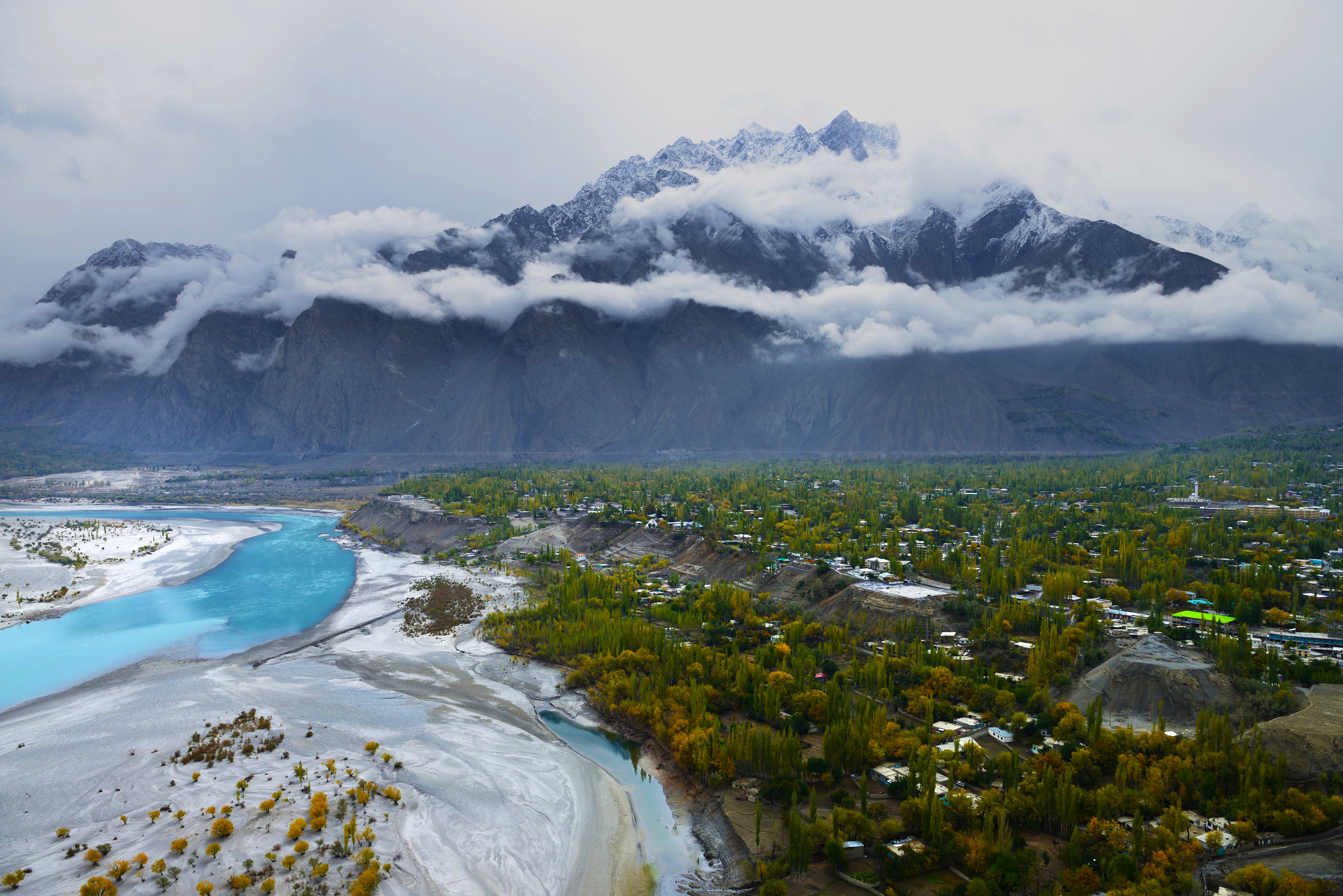
The Skardu Valley is located on the banks of Indus River

In the early 16th century, Sultan Said Khan of the Timurid Yarkent Khanate in what is now Xinjiang province of China, raided Baltistan. Given the threat posed by Sultan Said's invasion, Mughal attention was roused, prompting the 1586 conquest of Baltistan by the Mughal Emperor Akbar. The local Maqpon ruler pledged allegiance to him, and from that point onwards, beginning with Ali Sher Khan Anchan, the kings of Skardu were mentioned as rulers of Little Tibet in the historiography of the Mughal Empire.

Ali Sher Khan Anchan became the Maqpon king in 1580. He expanded the borders of the kingdom from Gilgit to Ladakh. When the Raja of Ladakh, Jamyang Namgyal, attacked the Muslim principalities in the district of Purik (Kargil), annihilating the Skardu garrison at Kharbu and putting to sword a number of petty Muslim rulers there, Anchan left with a strong army by way of Marol and, bypassing the Ladakhi army, occupied Leh, the capital of Ladakh. It appears that the Balti conquest of Ladakh took place in about 1594. The Raja of Ladakh was ultimately taken prisoner. Then Ali Sher Khan Anchan went to march on Gilgit with an army, and conquered Astore, Gilgit, Hunza, and Chilas. Mughal forces again intruded into the region during the reign of Shah Jahan in 1634–6 under the forces of Zafar Khan, to settle a dispute over the throne between the successors of Anchan, Adam Khan and his elder brother Abdul Khan. It was only after this point, during the rule of Shah Jahan and Aurangzeb, that Skardu's ruling family was firmly under Mughal influence. The ability of the Mughal crown to fund expeditions to territories of marginal value, such as Baltistan, was an evidence of the wealth in the Mughal coffers.

=== Modern history ===
In 1839, Dogra commander Zorawar Singh defeated Balti forces in battles at Wanko Pass and the Thano Kun plains, clearing his path for the invasion of the Skardu Valley. He seized Skardu Fort on behalf of the Dogra dynasty based in Jammu, under the suzerainty of the Sikh Empire at that time. Singh's forces massacred a large number of the garrison's defenders, and publicly tortured Kahlon Rahim Khan of Chigtan in front of a crowd of local Baltis and their chiefs.

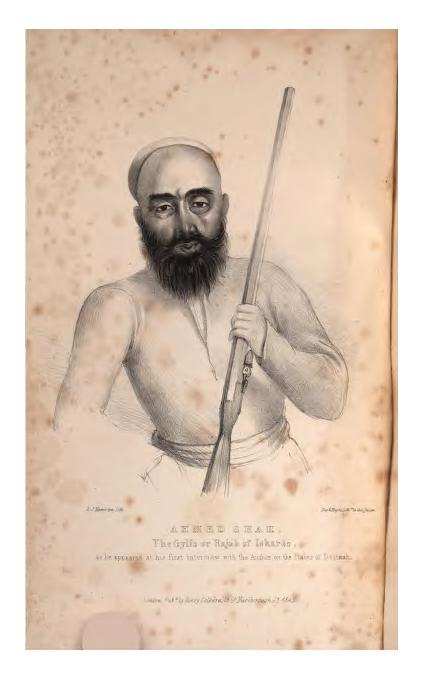
Ahmed Shah, the last Maqpon king before the 1840 Dogra invasion

Dogra forces failed in their 1841 attempt to conquer Tibet. Following their defeat, Ladakhis rebelled against Dogra rule. Baltis under the leadership of Raja Ahmed Shah soon rebelled against the Dogras as well, so maharaja Gulab Singh dispatched his commander Wazir Lakhpat to recapture Skardu. His forces were able to convince a guard to betray the garrison by leaving a gate unlocked, thereby allowing Dogra forces to recapture the fort and massacre its Balti defenders. The raja of the Baltis was forced to pay an annual tribute to the Dogra maharaja in Jammu, and also to supply the fort's provisions.

Following the Dogra victory, Muhammad Shah was crowned Raja of Skardu in return for his loyalty to the Jammu crown during the rebellion, and was able to exercise some power under the Dogra administration. By 1845, the region was completely subjugated by the Dogra rulers of Jammu. Military commanders held real governing power in the area even after the creation of the princely state of Jammu and Kashmir in 1846, until 1851, when Kedaru Thanedar was installed as a civilian administrator of Baltistan. During this time, Skardu and Kargil were governed as a single district. Ladakh would later be joined to the district, while Skardu would serve as the winter capital of Ladakh Wazarat, with Leh as the summer capital, up until 1947.

Under the administration of Mehta Mangal between 1875 and 1885, Skardu's Ranbirgarh fort was built as his headquarters and residence, as well as a cantonment and various other government buildings. Sikhs from Punjab were also encouraged by Dogra dynasty to migrate to Skardu and to set up commercial enterprises during this period. The Sikh population prospered, and continued to grow, eventually also settling in nearby Shigar and Khaplu.

==== 1947–48 Indo-Pakistan War ====
After the Partition of British India, on 22 October 1947, Pakistan launched a tribal invasion of princely state of Jammu and Kashmir after Poonch rebellion and Jammu Muslim massacres, leading to maharaja Hari Singh acceding to India on 26 October. The Gilgit Scouts, under the leadership of Major William Brown and Babar Khan, mutinied on 1 November 1947, bringing the Gilgit Agency under the control of Pakistan.

Major Aslam Khan took over the command of the Gilgit Scouts, organised a force of some 600 men from the rebels and local recruits as Ibex Force, and launched attacks on the remaining parts of the State under Indian control. Skardu was an important target because Aslam Khan felt that Gilgit could be threatened from there. The Skardu garrison was defended by a contingent of 6th Jammu and Kashmir Infantry under the command of Col. Sher Jung Thapa. The garrison was besieged by Ibex Force under Lt. Babar Khan in February 1948 as the city fell into the rebel hands, cutting off supplies to the garrison. In June col. Mata ul-Mulk and col. Burhan ud-Din, the brothers of Mehtar of Chitral, arrived with contingents of Chitral Bodyguard and Chitral Scouts. After holding the garrison for 6 months, Thapa and his forces surrendered to Mata ul-Mulk on 14 August 1948.

=== In Pakistan ===
Skardu became headquarters of the Baltistan Agency after 1948. Baltistan and Gilgit agencies were abolished in 1972 and merged to form Northern Areas, with Skardu becoming headquarters of Baltistan District; Northern Areas were renamed as Gilgit-Baltistan in 2009. Today Skardu is one of the primary cultural and administrative centres of the region, alongside Gilgit.

== Administration ==
The city of Skardu constitutes a tehsil within Skardu District. Skardu District itself is part of the larger Baltistan Division. The Skardu city being a tehsil/taluka is administered by an Assistant Commissioner of BPS-17 belonging to the Pakistan Administrative service whereas Skardu District is administered by a Deputy Commissioner BPS-19 of the Pakistan Administrative Service.

== Geography ==
=== Topography ===
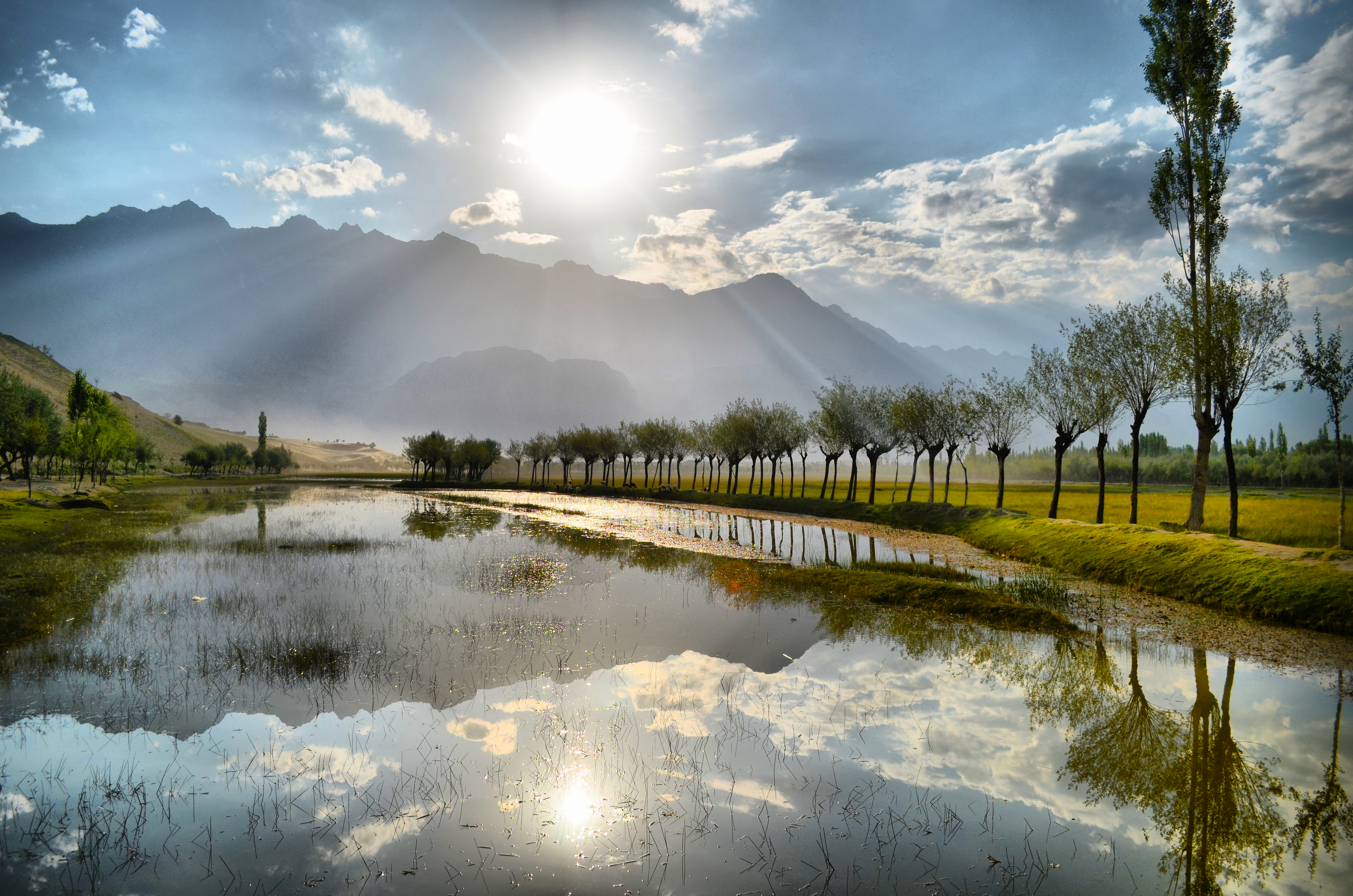
Skardu's Katpana Lake

Skardu International Airport is situated at an elevation of 2,230 metres (7,320 feet) above sea level, though the mountain peaks surrounding Skardu Valley reach elevations of 4,500–5,800 metres (14,800–19,000 feet). Upstream from Skardu are located large glaciers such as the Baltoro Glacier, Biafo Glacier, and Chogo Lungma Glacier, which are surrounded by some of the highest mountains in the world, including K2, ranked second globally at 8,611 m (28,251 ft), Gasherbrum at 8,068 m (26,470 ft), and Masherbrum at 7,821 m (25,659 ft).

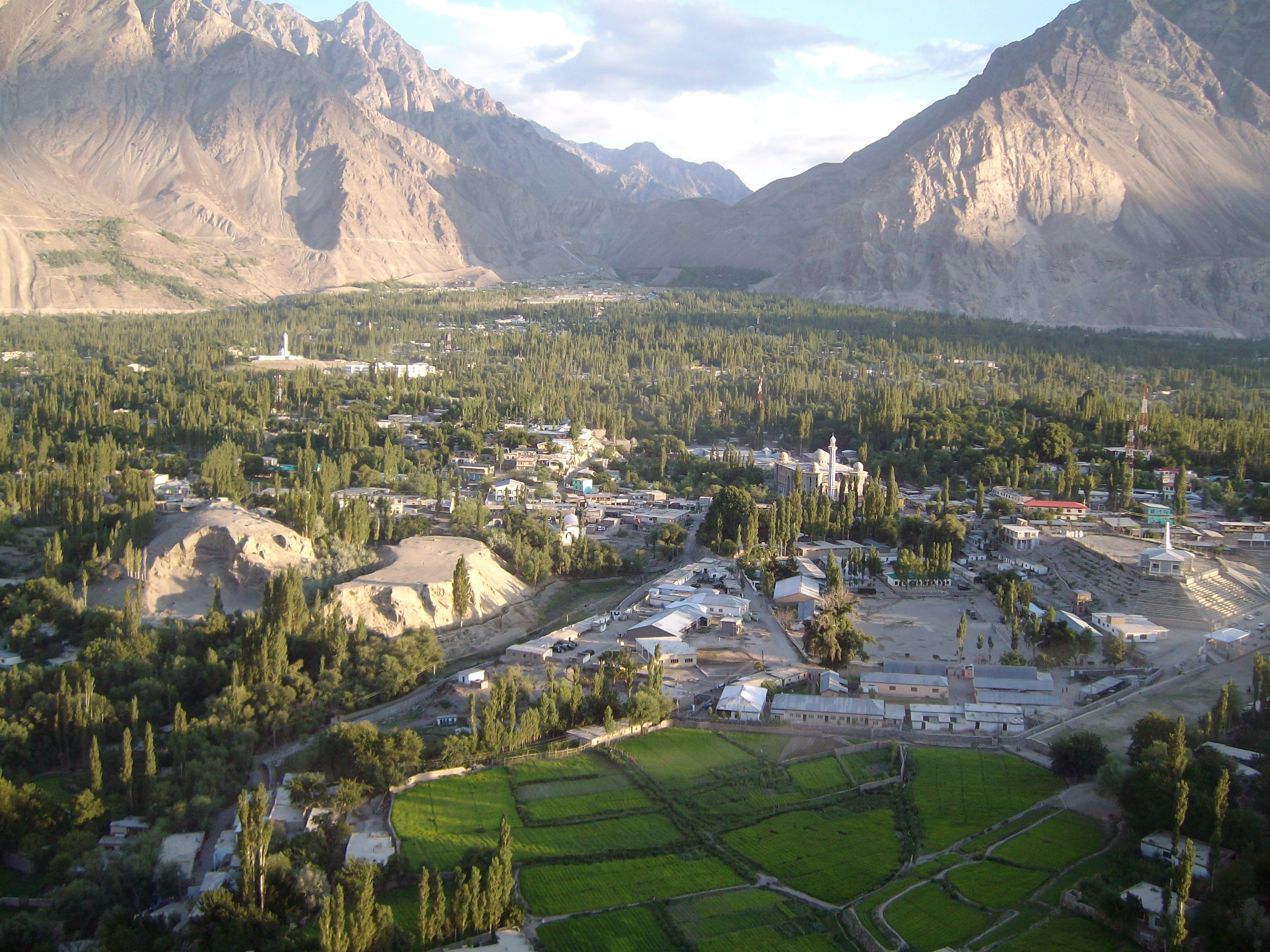
Skardu is located in a broad valley carved by glaciation.

=== Geology ===
Skardu is located along the Kohistan-Ladakh terrane, formed as a magmatic arc over a Tethyan subduction zone that was later accreted onto the Eurasian Plate. The region has low seismic activity compared to surrounding regions, suggesting that Skardu is located in a passive structural element of the Himalayan thrust. The stone in the Skardu Valley is Katzarah schist, with a radiometric estimated age of 37 to 105 million years.

=== Climate ===
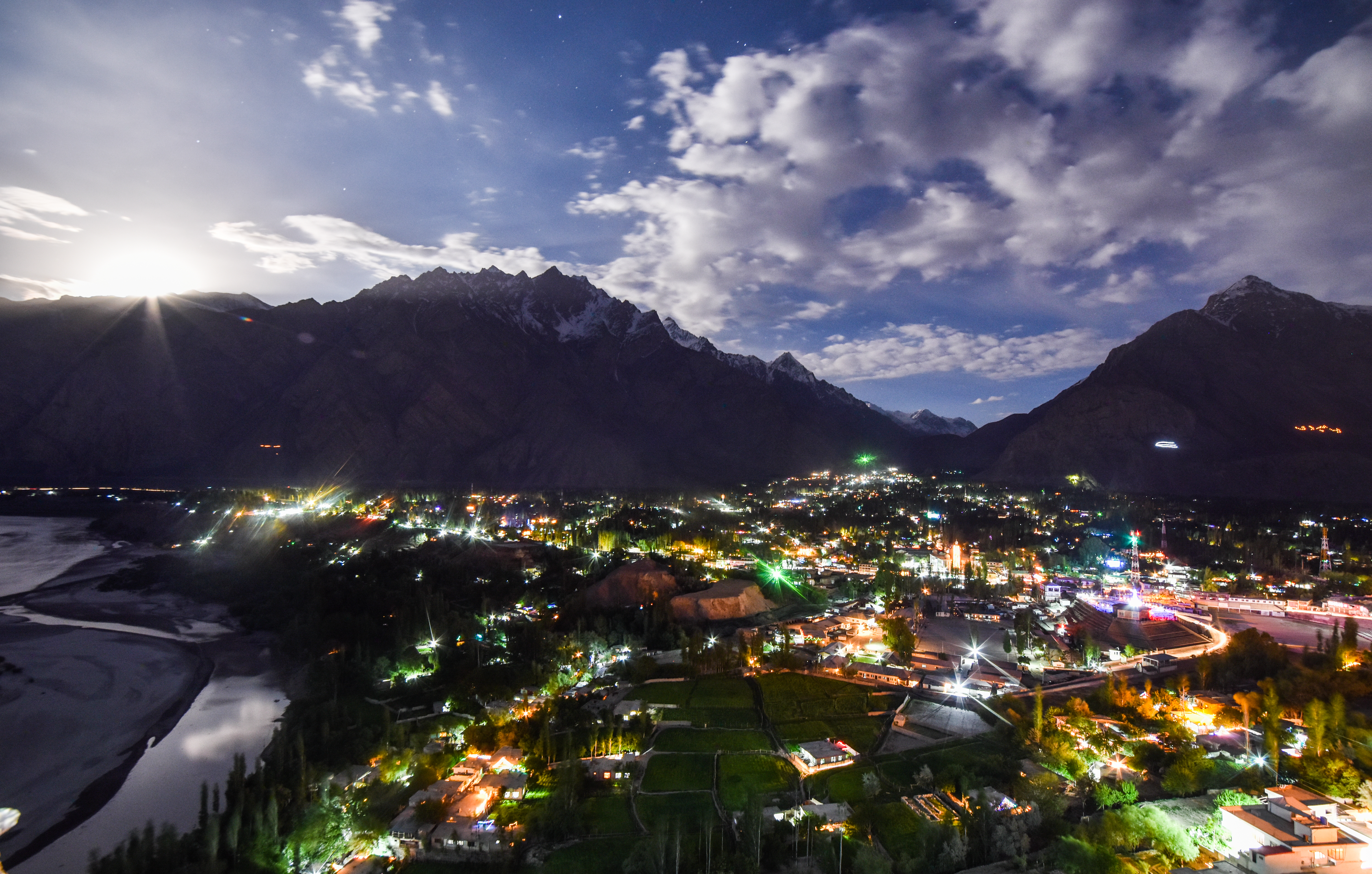
Skardu at dusk

Skardu features a cold semi-arid climate (Köppen climate classification BSk). The climate of Skardu during the summer is moderated by its mountain setting; the intense heat of lowland Pakistan does not reach it. The mountains block out the summer monsoon, and summer rainfall is thus quite low. However, these mountains result in very severe winter weather. During the April-to-October tourist season, temperatures vary between a maximum of 27 °C (81 °F) and a minimum (in October) 8 °C (46 °F).

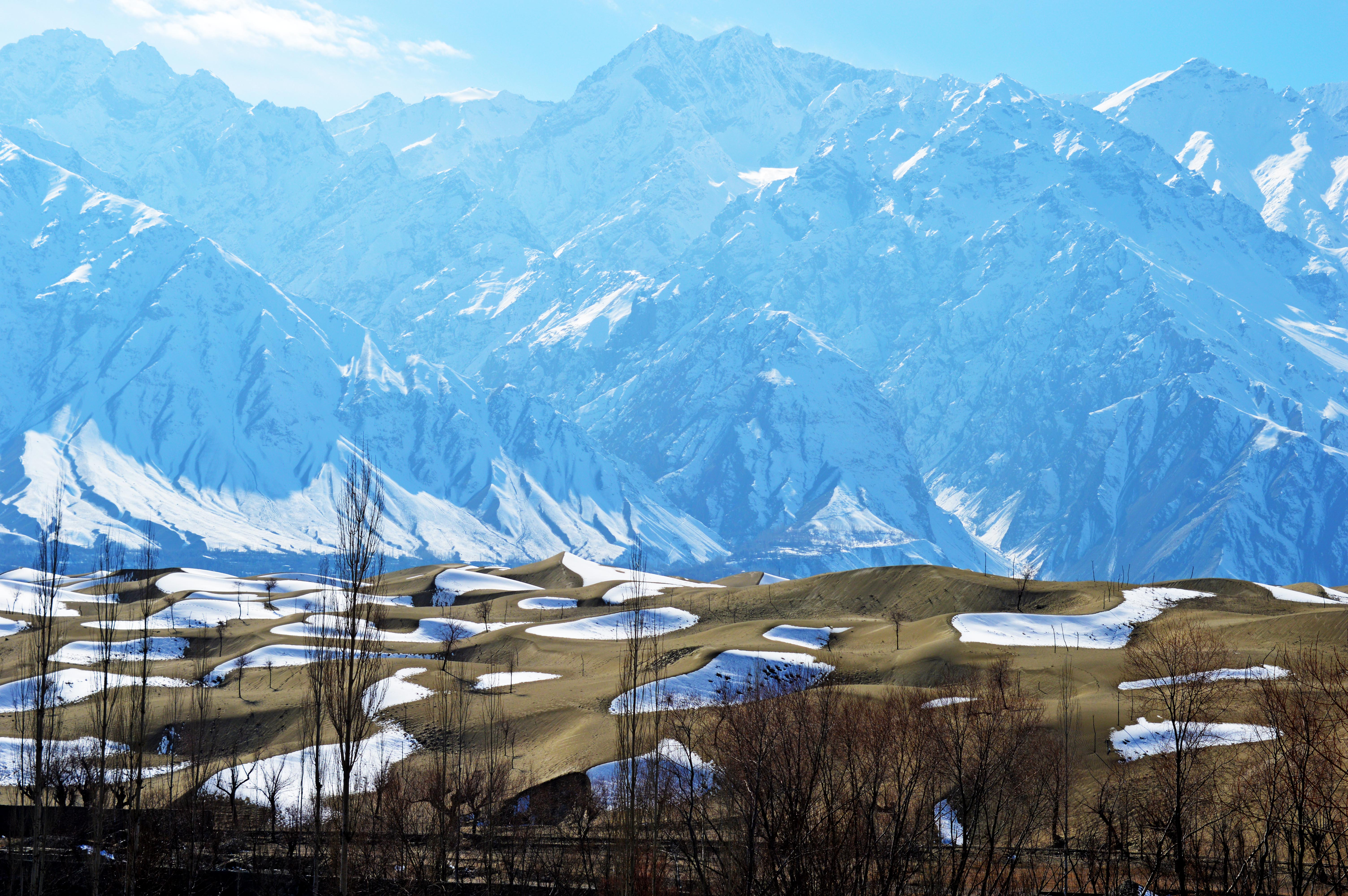
Sand dunes in the Cold Desert of Skardu covered in snow during winter.

Temperatures can drop to below −10 °C (14 °F) in the December-to-January midwinter period. The lowest recorded temperature was −24.1 °C (−11 °F) on 7 January 1995.

Climate data for Skardu
Month	Jan	Feb	Mar	Apr	May	Jun	Jul	Aug	Sep	Oct	Nov	Dec	Year
Record high °C (°F)	13.9 (57.0)	16.7 (62.1)	24.0 (75.2)	29.6 (85.3)	34.4 (93.9)	40.0 (104.0)	41.0 (105.8)	41.0 (105.8)	38.2 (100.8)	31.2 (88.2)	22.9 (73.2)	16.2 (61.2)	41.0 (105.8)
Mean daily maximum °C (°F)	3.2 (37.8)	6.1 (43.0)	12.4 (54.3)	18.8 (65.8)	23.4 (74.1)	28.7 (83.7)	31.6 (88.9)	31.2 (88.2)	27.2 (81.0)	20.4 (68.7)	13.2 (55.8)	6.5 (43.7)	14.9 (58.8)
Mean daily minimum °C (°F)	−8.0 (17.6)	−4.4 (24.1)	1.5 (34.7)	6.6 (43.9)	9.7 (49.5)	13.4 (56.1)	16.4 (61.5)	16.0 (60.8)	11.4 (52.5)	4.3 (39.7)	−1.9 (28.6)	−5.6 (21.9)	4.1 (39.4)
Record low °C (°F)	−24.1 (−11.4)	−20.0 (−4.0)	−13.5 (7.7)	−1.1 (30.0)	0.4 (32.7)	4.0 (39.2)	7.5 (45.5)	7.0 (44.6)	2.6 (36.7)	−4.2 (24.4)	−9.5 (14.9)	−17.2 (1.0)	−24.1 (−11.4)
Average rainfall mm (inches)	27.5 (1.08)	25.9 (1.02)	36.9 (1.45)	31.3 (1.23)	25.3 (1.00)	9.0 (0.35)	9.8 (0.39)	12.2 (0.48)	9.3 (0.37)	7.3 (0.29)	5.6 (0.22)	16.3 (0.64)	172.7 (6.80)
Average relative humidity (%) (at 17:00 PST)	64.3	52.0	34.9	25.6	24.6	22.3	27.3	30.7	29.9	31.2	36.6	56.2	29.6
Source: Pakistan Meteorological Department

== Tourism ==
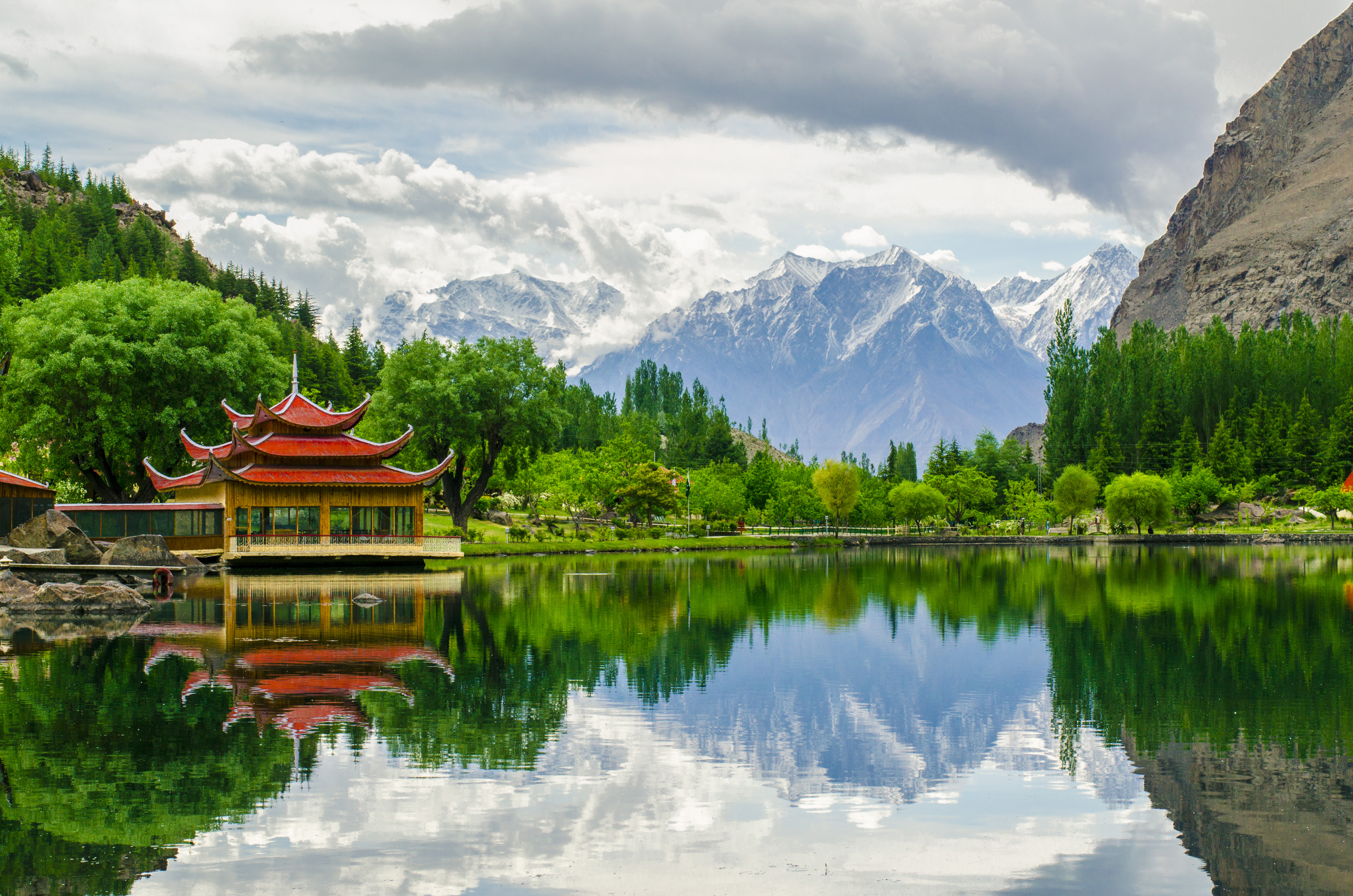
Shangrila Lake with adjoining Shangrila resort

Skardu, along with Gilgit, is a major tourism, trekking and expedition hub in Gilgit-Baltistan. The mountainous terrain of the region, which includes four of the world's 14 eight-thousander peaks, attracts tourists, trekkers and mountaineers from around the world. The main tourist season is from April to October; at other times of the year, the area can be cut off for extended periods by the snowy, freezing winter weather. Skardu airport is now open for international flights.

=== Peaks ===
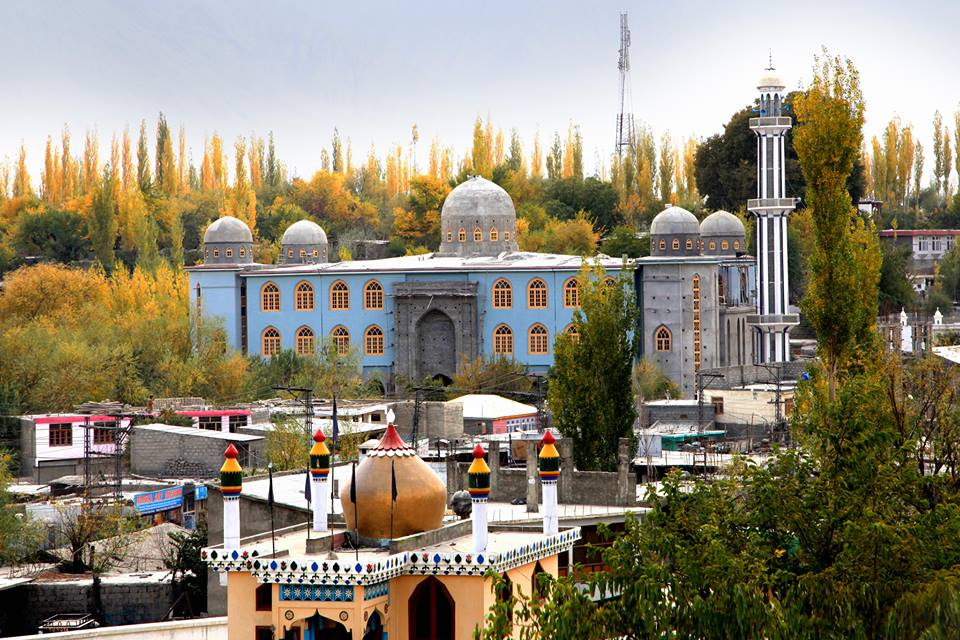
Under construction Skardu Grand Mosque

Accessible from Skardu by road, the nearby Askole and Hushe are the main gateways to the snow-covered 8,000-metre (26,000-foot) peaks including K2, the Gasherbrums, Broad Peak, and the Trango Towers, and to the huge glaciers of Baltoro, Biafo and Trango. This makes Skardu the main tourist and mountaineering base in the area, which has led to the development of a reasonably extensive tourist infrastructure including shops and hotels. The popularity of the region results in high prices, especially during the main trekking season.

=== Skardu Fort ===
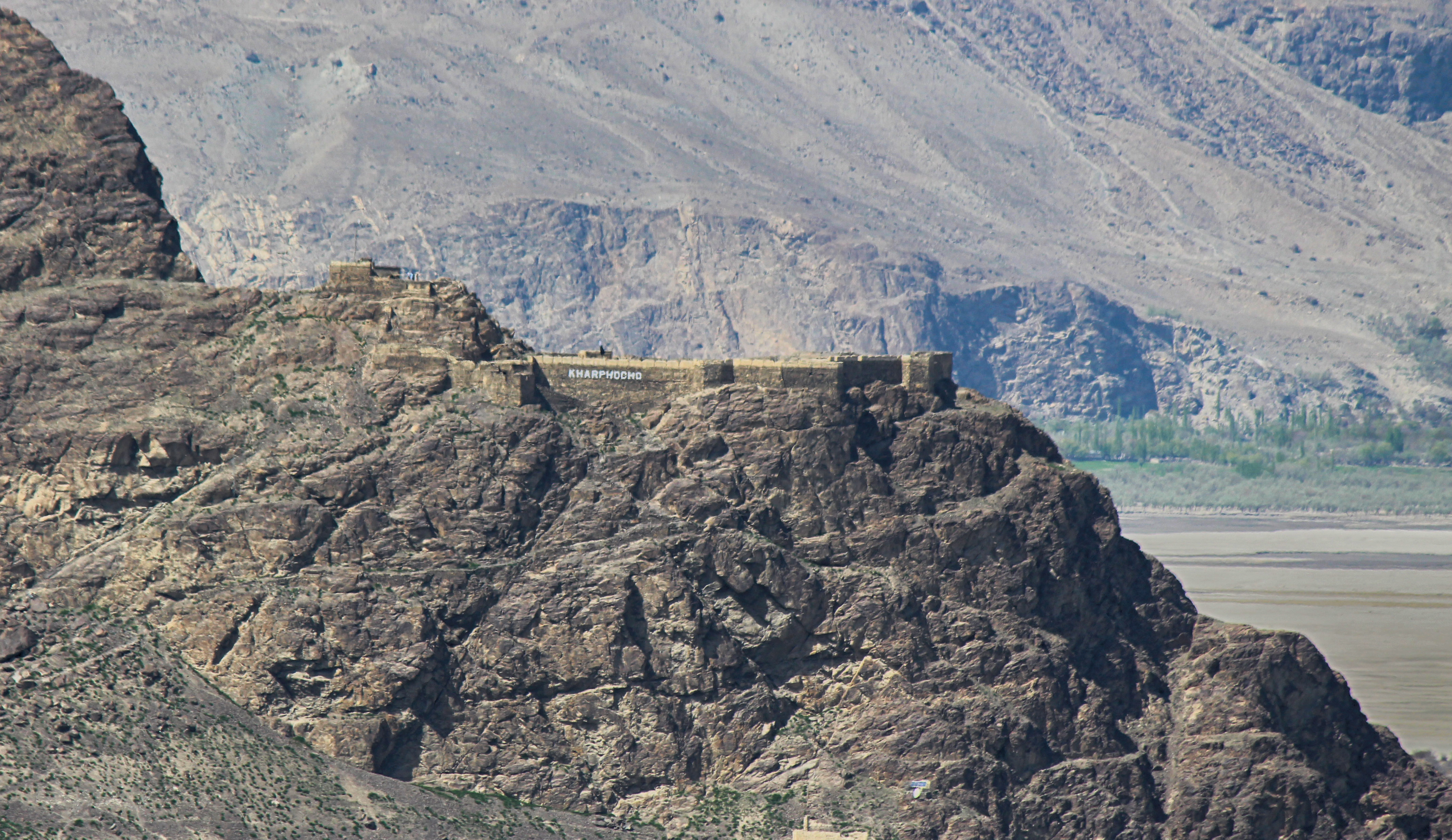
Skardu Fort was built in the 16th century.

Skardu Fort or Kharphocho Fort lies on the eastern face of the Khardrong or Mindoq-Khar ("Castle of Queen Mindoq") hill 15 metres (49 feet) above Skardu town. The fort dates from the 8th century CE and contains an old mosque probably dating back to the arrival of Islam in the 16th century CE. The fort provides a panoramic view of Skardu town, the Skardu Valley and the Indus River. It was built by Maqpon rulers of Baltistan. It was a seven-storey building. It was built on a design similar to that of Leh Palace in Ladakh and the Potala Palace in Lhasa, Tibet. The name Kharpochhe means the king of fort — Khar in Balti means castle or fort and Chhe means king.

=== Lakes ===
==== Kachura ====
There are two Kachura lakes in Kachura Valley — the less well-known (Upper) Kachura Lake and the more famous Shangrila Lake ("Lower Kachura Lake"). Shangrila Lake is home to the Shangrila Resort hotel complex (possibly the reason for the lake's alternative name), built in an East Asian style and another popular destination for tourists in Gilgit-Baltistan.

The resort has a unique restaurant, set up inside the fuselage of an aircraft that crashed. On 3 October 1953, a DC-3 Aircraft belonging to Orient Airways crashed landed after three minutes of taking off. Although all people on the aircraft survived the crash, the plane never saw another day in the sky. Kachura Lake is famous for its deep blue waters. The lakes, at 2,500 metres in elevation.

==== Satpara ====
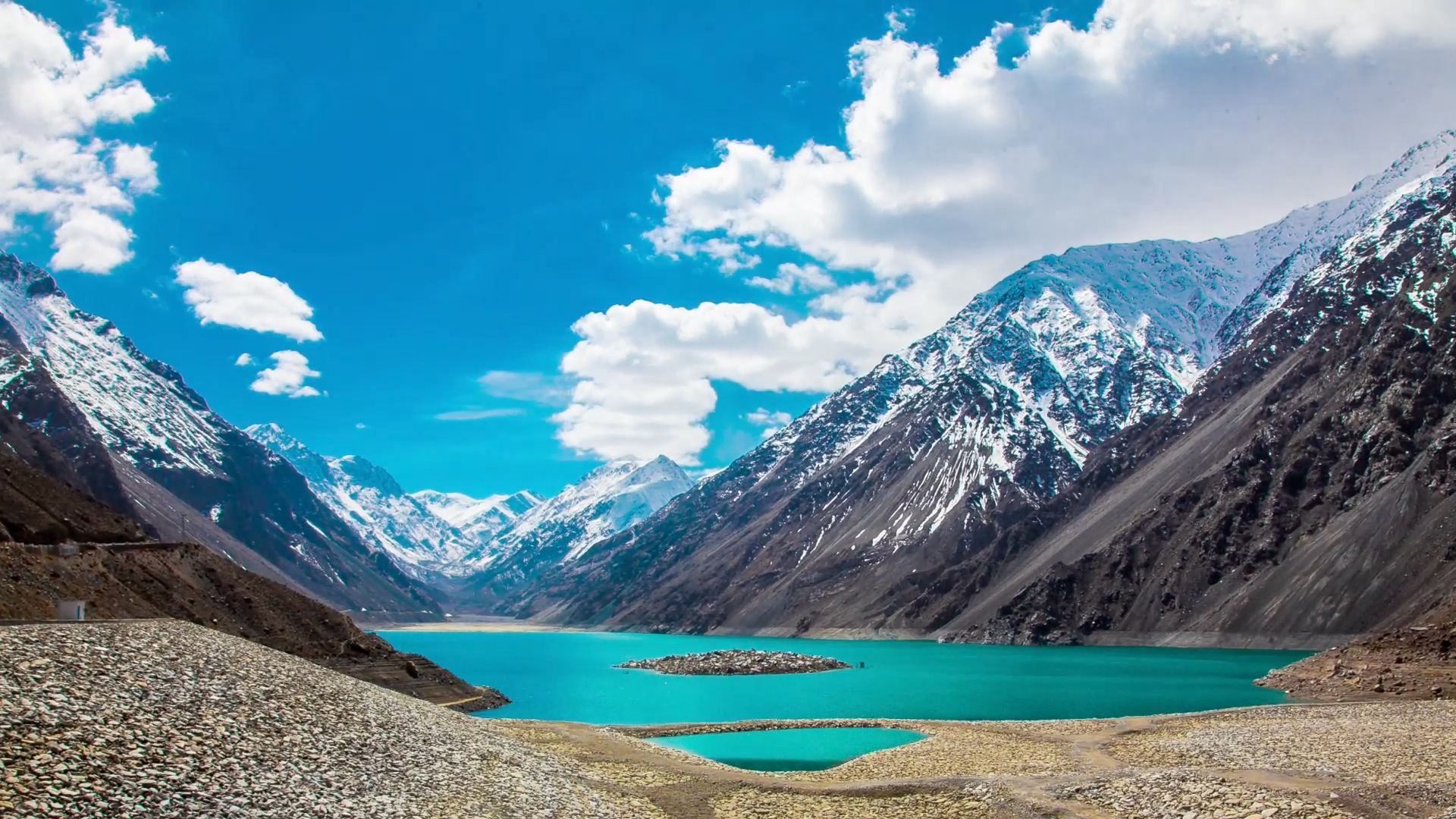
Satpara Lake

Satpara Lake is Skardu Valley's main lake. In 2002, the Federal Government decided to build a dam on the Satpara Lake allocating $10 million to the project, in 2004. Progress has, however, been slow. Satpara Lake is 6 miles (9.7 km) from Skardu. Satpara Lake is one of the largest fresh water lakes in the countryside offering trout fishing and row boating. This lake is the source of Skardu's drinking water. The Satpara Dam was mostly completed in 2011 and four powerhouse units are operational; the latest started operation in June 2013.

== Transport ==
=== Road ===
The normal road route from Islamabad into Skardu is via the Karakoram Highway and, from near Jaglot, via the Baltistan Highway into the Skardu Valley. Roads once linked Skardu to Srinagar and Leh, though none are open for cross-LoC travel.

=== Air ===
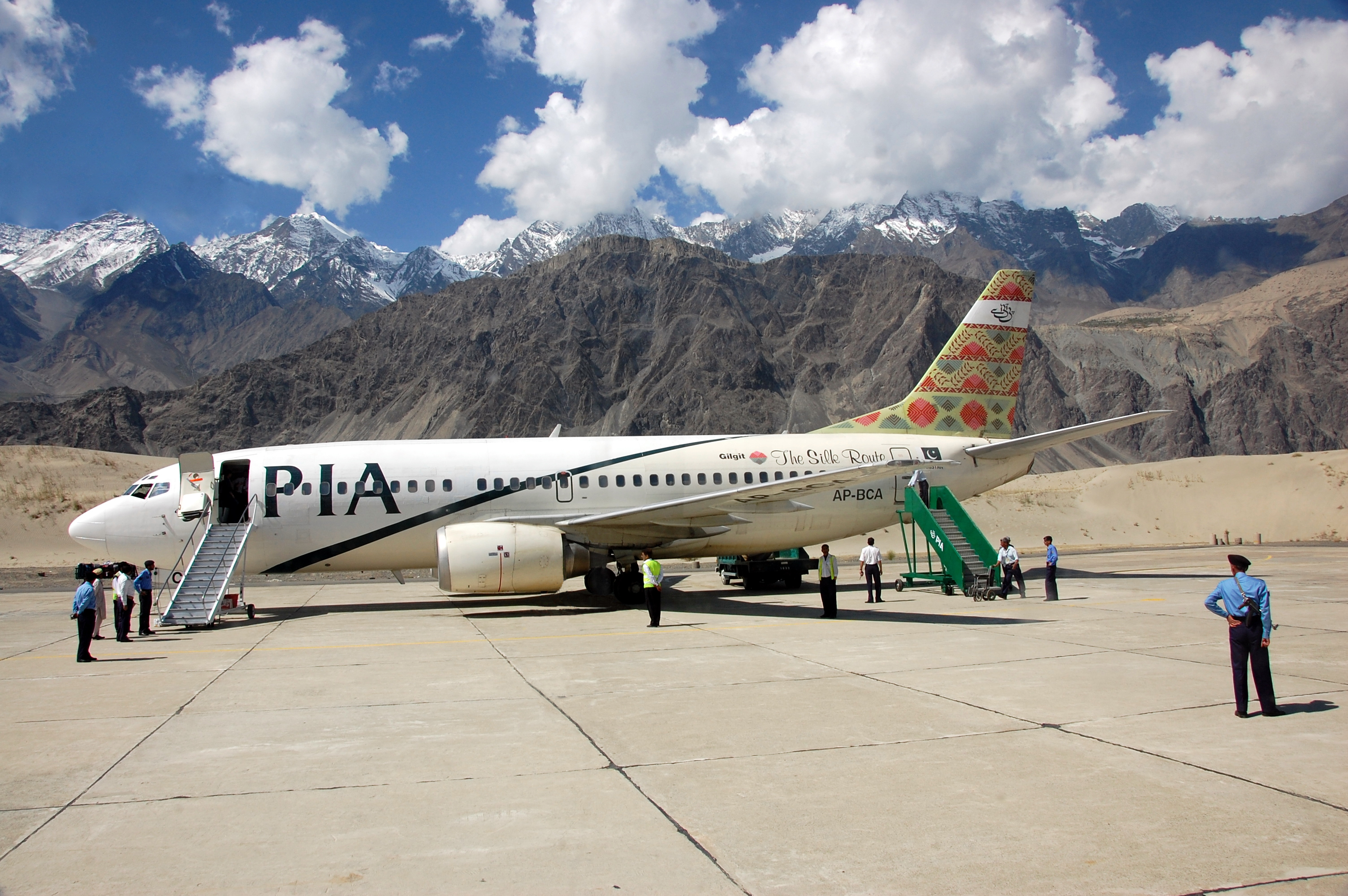
Pakistan International Airlines operated one daily flight to Skardu International Airport using a Boeing 737-300. It has since been replaced by an Airbus A320 and further supplemented by an ATR 42 as of end-2021.

On 2 December 2021, the Skardu International Airport was designated and re-inaugurated as an international airport after providing upgrades to the airport to become a tourism hub for Gilgit-Baltistan. Flydubai has submitted a request to start international operations to and from Skardu airport, which would potentially become the first airline to start international routes from Skardu.

== Infrastructure ==
The Satpara Dam development project on the Satpara Lake was inaugurated in 2003. It was completed in 2011. It is 6 km (4 mi) south of Skardu city and is at an elevation of 2,700 metres (8,900 ft) above mean sea level. The main source of water is melted ice from the Deosai Plains during the summer season. Now Satpara Dam provides drinking water to the whole city of Skardu and agricultural water to major areas of Skardu, for example, Gayoul, Newrangha, Khlangranga, Shigari Khurd, etc. It is a multipurpose project, which will produce 17.36 megawatts hydro generation, irrigate 15,000 acres (61 km^{2}) of land and provide 13 cusecs drinking water daily to Skardu city.

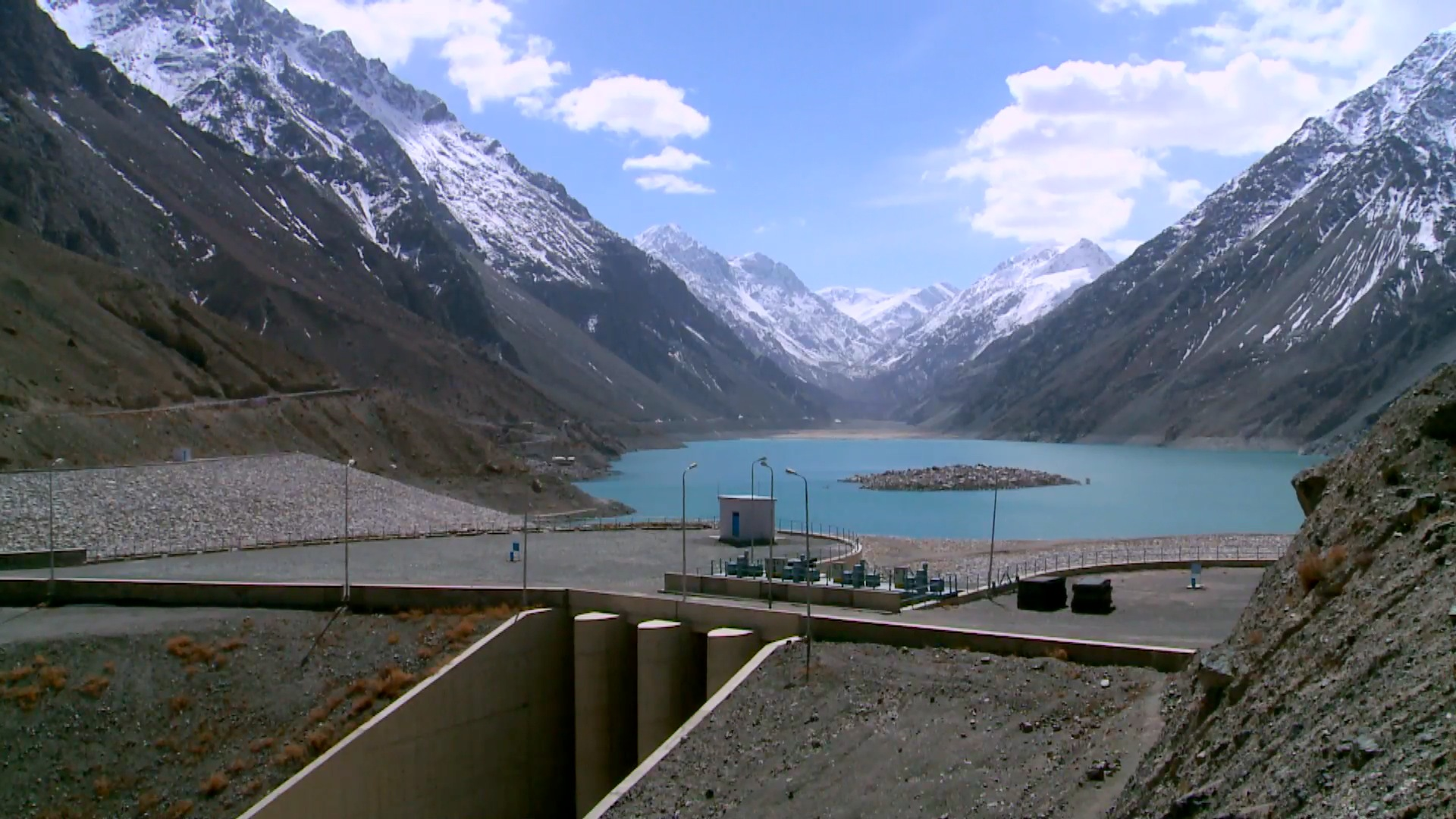
Satpara Dam at Skardu

Skardu also hosts the University of Baltistan, established in 2017 by the federal government. Previously it was a satellite campus of the Karakoram International University.

== Notable people ==
- Amen Aamir, first woman from Gilgit-Baltistan to qualify as a pilot.
- Ali Sadpara (2 February 1976 – 5 February 2021), Pakistani high-altitude mountaineer, born in the village of Sadpara, located near Skardu
