= Karakoram International University =

University in Gilgit-Baltistan, Pakistan

- قراقرم انٹرنیشنل یونیورسٹی
- Motto: انظروا ماذا فی السمٰوٰت والارض
- Type: Educational Institution
- Established: 2002
- Affiliations: HEC
- Chancellor: President of Pakistan
- Vice-Chancellor: Attaullah Shah
- Academic staff: 192
- Administrative staff: 1000
- Students: 7000+
- Location: Gilgit, Pakistan
- Campus: Urban
- Colours: Blue, Golden
- Website: kiu.edu.pk

Karakoram International University (KIU) or Karakoram University (Urdu: قراقرم انٹرنیشنل یونیورسٹی) is a public sector university located in Gilgit, the capital city of the Gilgit-Baltistan region in Pakistan. It was established in 2002 with a charter from the Federal Government of Pakistan, aiming to increase access to higher education in Gilgit-Baltistan.

== History ==
The KIU was established with a charter from the Federal Government of Pakistan and by the orders of the then president Pervez Musharraf.

According to its charter, Karakoram International University is a multi-campus university and additional campuses are to be established at feasible localities. Currently, the main campus of the Karakoram International University has nearly 8,000 students, more than 150 faculty members, and over a hundred administrative staff in 21 different academic departments.

Faculties

There are three faculties: the Faculty of Humanities and Social Sciences, the Faculty of Natural Sciences & Engineering, and the Faculty of Life Sciences and 21 departments.

== Academics ==
=== Bachelor's degree Programs ===
- Bachelor of Science in Computer Sciences BS (CS)
- Bachelor of Business Administration-BB (IT)
- Bachelor of Science in International Relations (BS)
- Bachelor of Science in Agriculture major in Food Technology (BS)
- Bachelor of Arts in English Linguistics and Literature (BA Hons)
- Bachelor of Science in Chemistry (BS)
- Bachelor of Arts in Education (B.Ed) Elementary 4 years (pre step)
- Bachelor of Science in Biology (Animal Sciences) (BS)
- Bachelor of Science in Biology (Plant sciences) (BS)
- Bachelor of Science in Media and Communication (BS)
- Bachelor of Science in Physics (BS)
- Bachelor of Science in Economics (BS)
- Bachelor of Science in Environmental Science (BS)
- Bachelor of Science in Behavioral Sciences. (BS)
- Bachelor of Science in Earth Sciences (Geology) (BS)
- Bachelor of Science in Earthquake Engineering (BS)
- Bachelor of Science in Mining Engineering (BS)
- Bachelor of Business Administration - Management (BBA)
- Bachelor of Science in Mathematics (BS)
- Bachelor of Science in Statistics (BS)
- Bachelor of Computer Arts (BCA)
- Bachelor of Fine Arts (BFA)
- Bachelor's degree in Design (Communication Design) BCD

=== Master's degree Programs ===
- Master of Science in Mathematics (M.Sc)
- Master of Science in Statistics (M.Sc)
- Master of Science in International Relations (M.Sc)
- Master of Science in Chemistry (M.Sc)
- Master of Arts in English Literature (MA)
- Master of Arts in English Linguistics (MA)
- Master of Science in Agriculture in Food Technology
- Master of Science in Behavioral Sciences (M.Sc)
- Master of Arts in Education (MA)
- Master of Science in Economics (M.Sc)
- Master of Science in Biology (Animal Sciences)
- Master of Science in Biology (Plant sciences)
- Master of Science in Physics (M.Sc)
- Master of Business Administration in Management (Regular) MBA

=== Self support evening master's programs ===
The following programs are taken at evening time for self-support students.

- Master of Information Technology (MIT PGD in Computer Sciences)
- Master of Science in Media & Communication Studies (M.Sc)
- Master of Business Administration (Executive) MBA
- Master of Education M.Ed (One Year Diploma)
- Diploma in Agriculture
- Master of Science in Economics & Finance M.Sc

== Campuses ==
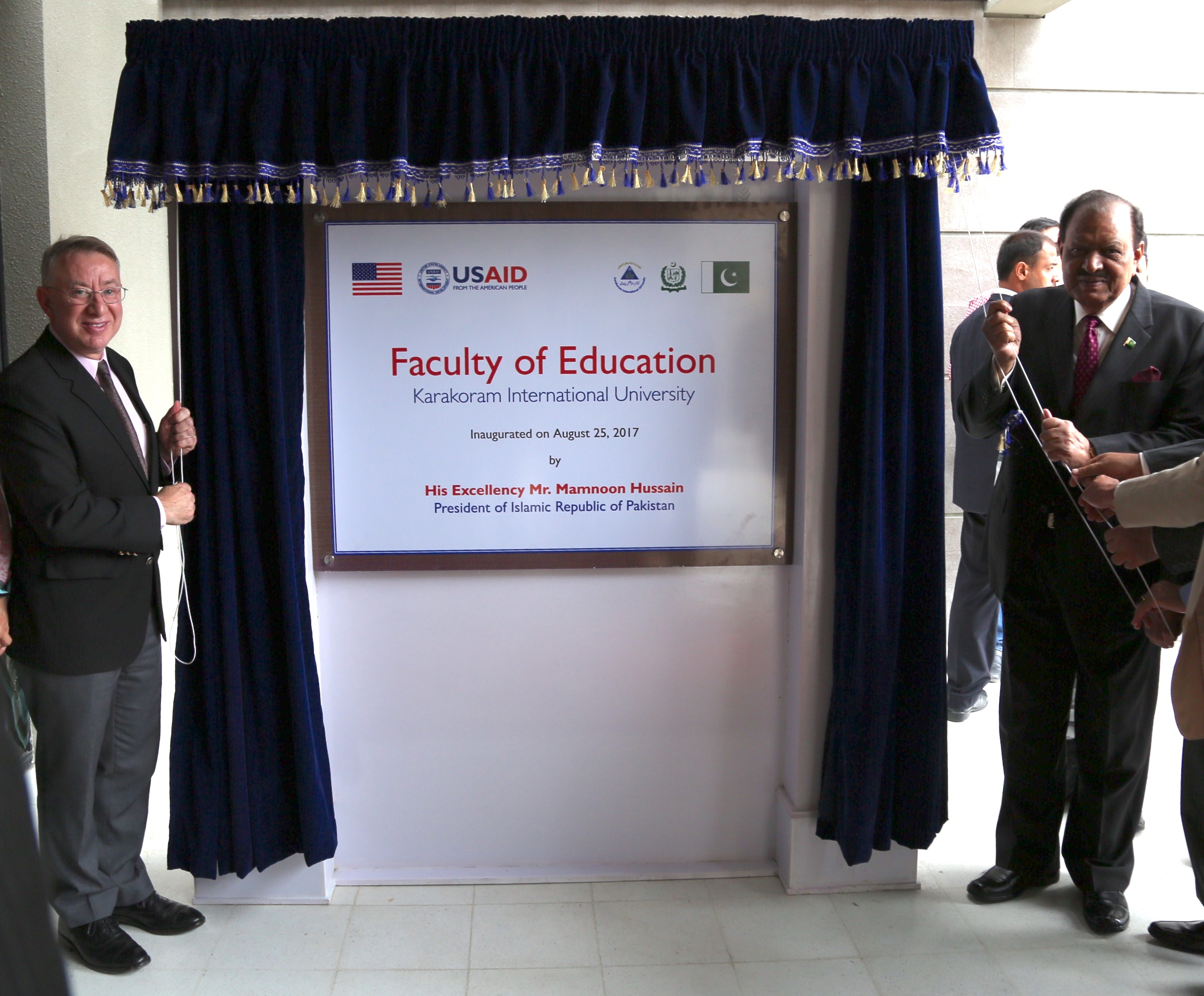
Inauguration ceremony for Faculty of Education building

The main campus is situated on University Road in Gilgit. Expanded In 2011, a satellite campus was established in Skardu. That has now become an independent university (University of Baltistan). In 2016, another satellite campus was established in Hunza.

In August 2017, a new USAID-funded Faculty of Education building was inaugurated by the President of Pakistan, Mamnoon Hussain and Mission Director Jerry Bisson at the Gilgit-Baltistan campus (Main Campus).

Campuses of the university include:

- KIU main campus, Gilgit
- KIU sub campus, Hunza
- KIU sub campus, Ghizar
- KIU sub campus, Diamer, Chilas

== See also ==
- University of Baltistan
- University of Karachi
- University of the Punjab
- University of Gujrat
