= Operation Eraze =

Indo-Pakistani War of 1947–48 operation

- Part of the Kashmir conflict and Indo-Pakistani War of 1947–1948
- Gurais (Jammu and Kashmir)
Date	15 April 1948 - 29 July 1948
Location	Jammu and Kashmir
Result	Indian victory
Territorial changes	India pushes back Pakistani forces and recaptures Tragbal, Kanzalwan, Gurais

Belligerents
Indian Army; 2nd Battalion, Bihar Regiment; 1st Battalion, The Grenadiers; 2/4 Gorkha Rifles; Patiala Mountain Battery Indian Air Force	Gilgit Scouts Pakistani tribal militias

Commanders and leaders
Gen. K.S. Thimayya	Unknown

Operation Eraze is the codename of the assault and capture of Gurais in northern Kashmir by the Indian Army during the Indo-Pakistani War of 1947.

== History ==
Gurais is an important communication centre where the route from Srinagar comes north to the Kishenganga river, crosses it in the vicinity of Gurais and Dawar and then proceeds to Gilgit via the Burzil pass and the Astor valley. Gurais is also connected to Muzaffarabad by a track along the river valley and by cross-country tracks south to Sonamarg and east to Dras.

The fall of Muzaffarabad led to the advancing of tribal lashkars to Gurais along the Kishenganga valley. Tribal lashkars pushed back by the operations of 161 Infantry Brigade in the winter of 1947 retreated to Gurais over the Rajdhani pass when the snows sealed the pass for the winter. Pakistani forces comprising regular army troops from the Gilgit Scouts and deserters from the princely State Forces reinforced the lashkars. The Pakistanis were poised to attack Tragbal just north of Bandipore and enter the Kashmir valley as soon as the snows melted.

The Indian Army responded by sending 2nd Battalion, Bihar Regiment to advance on 15 April 1948 to contact the enemy along the pilgrim route, i.e. the Bandipore - Kanzalwan - Gurais axis. The battalion captured Tragbal and pushed the raiders back to the Rajdhani pass. In May 1948, the battalion was rotated and replaced by the 1st Battalion, Indian Grenadiers under Lt. Col. Singh.

Maj Gen K. S. Thimayya, the 'General Officer Commanding' of the Srinagar Division, prepared for a spring offensive to counter the Pakistanis. The 1st Grenadiers won the race to capture the still snow-bound Rajdhani Pass, on the night of 26/27 May, occupying it hours before the Pakistanis. Thimayya now planned for the capture of Gurais codenamed Operation Eraze. Since a single battalion was inadequate, the 2nd Battalion, 4 Gorkha Rifles was inducted to Tragbal and the 1st Grenadiers moved forward for offensive operations, supported by Patiala Mountain Battery. Thimayya planned to advance two companies of 2/4 GR on 24 June along the pilgrim route to hold the enemy and deceive him of the direction of the attack proper to be launched on 25 June by the 1st Grenadiers over the snow-capped ridges along a foot track through Viju Gali. The 1st Grenadiers advanced by tactical leaps and bounds but were caught in the open on the night of 26/27 June by a blizzard without shelter. By superhuman privations, they managed to bring up the guns, outflank the enemy and push him off the ridge towards Gurais. The enemy broke and ran and 1st Grenadiers captured Gurais on at dawn on 28 June.

In the meantime, 2/4 Gorkha Rifles had successfully advanced along the pilgrim route and pushed back the Pakistanis from Kanzalwan which they captured with two companies. The Pakistanis stabilised their positions downriver of Kanzalwan and proceeded to isolate the Gorkha picquets. This left the road to Rajdhani pass, occupied by the Battalion Tactical Headquarters and one company of the 2/4 Gorkha Rifles, vulnerable to attack by large forces. A quick attack from Gurais on 26 July failed to relieve Kanzalwan. The 1st Grenadiers then launched a two-pronged night attack supported by artillery on 29 July. The Gorkhas by rigorous patrolling forced the Pakistanis and captured one of the dominating heights over Kanzalwan. The concerted attack broke the siege and the raiders fled westwards towards Taobat, harried by air strikes of the Indian Air Force.

For the remainder of the war, the raiders were content to secure the Burzil pass on the route to Skardu so as to secure the communications of their columns besieging Ladakh. The Indian Army devoid of infantry was unable to apre forces for progressing operations in this sector. Lt. Col. Singh, according to official war diaries, Gorkhas failed to clear Burzil Pass due to strong enemy counterattacks and he walked to Thimmaya requesting not to deploy the Regiment under his command to Ladakh. This strategic deployment allowed complete command control communications for the entire Kashmir valley.

== See also ==
- Battle of Pandu
- Battle of Chunj
- Operation Bison and Duck
- Battle of Thorgo
- Military operations in Poonch (1948)
- Military operations in Ladakh (1948)
