= Operation Bison (Jammu & Kashmir 1948) =

1948 military operation

Operation Bison/Duck
Date	1 November 1948 – 24 November 1948
Location	Kashmir
Result	Operation Duck: Operational failure Operation Bison: Operational Success
Territorial changes	India captures Zoji-La Pass and Kargil

Belligerents
India	Pakistan

Commanders and leaders
(India) Lt. Gen. K. M. Cariappa (India) Maj Gen KS Thimayya (India) Brig KL Atal	Unknown

Units involved
(India) 77th Para Brigade (India) 7th Light Cavalry (India) 1/5 RGR (FF)	Unknown

Strength
5,000 troops 30 tanks 90 artillery	Fewer than 1,000 troops

Casualties and losses
75 killed 296 wounded 3 tanks destroyed	54 killed 91 wounded

Operation Bison is the codename of the assault and capture of Zoji La, Dras and Kargil district in Ladakh by the Indian Army during the Indo-Pakistani War of 1947-1948.

Zoji La had been seized by Pakistani raiders in 1948 in their campaign to capture Ladakh. The pass was recaptured by Indian forces on 1 November in a daring assault, which achieved success primarily due to the surprise use of armour, then the highest altitude at which armour had operated in combat in the world.

Initially, an unsuccessful attack was launched by the 77th Parachute Brigade (Brig Atal) to capture Zoji La. Operation Duck, the earlier name for this assault, was renamed as Operation Bison by Lt Gen Cariappa, the Western Army commander. M5 Stuart light tanks of the 7th Cavalry regiment were moved in dismantled condition through Srinagar and winched across bridges while two field companies of the Madras Sappers converted the mule track from Baltal up the Zoji La to Gumri into a jeep track. The surprise attack on 1 November by the brigade with armour supported by two regiments of 25 pounders and a regiment of 3.7 inch guns, saw the Pakistanis being surprised. The pass was forced and the raider column pushed back to Matayan and later Dras. The brigade linked up on 24 November at Kargil with Indian troops advancing from Leh while the Pakistanis eventually withdrew northwards toward Skardu.

== See also ==
Articles related to same war:-

- Kashmir conflict
- Indo-Pakistani war of 1947–1948:-
  - Battle of Muzaffarabad
  - Siege of Skardu
  - Battle of Pandu
  - Battle of Shalateng
  - Battle of Chunj
