= Battle of Rawalakot =

Part of the First Kashmir War (1947)

- Part of the Kashmir conflict and Indo-Pakistani war of 1947–1948
Date	4 November 1947 – 15 November 1947
Location	Rawalakot, Jammu and Kashmir 33°51′12″N 73°45′05″E
Result	Azad Army victory: J&K State forces withdraw to Poonch; non-Muslim civilians evacuated to Poonch
Territorial changes	Rawalakot becomes part of the territory administered by Pakistan, known as Azad Jammu and Kashmir (AJK)

Belligerents
(Azad Kashmir) Azad Army (Note: Also referred to as the Mujahideen)	Jammu and Kashmir; Jammu and Kashmir State Forces; India; Indian Air Force

Commanders and leaders
Captain Hussain Khan †; Captain Sher Khan; Captain Bostan Khan	Colonel Ram Lal; Major Amarnath Lakhanpal; Captain Prakash Chand

Strength
~200 men and others	~2,000 men

Casualties and losses
260 casualties including 150 killed	400 killed Many wounded

The Battle of Rawalakot, was a battle fought by the Azad Kashmir Regular Force against the State of Jammu and Kashmir which took place in the city of Rawalakot and surrounding areas between November 4–14, 1947 during the First Kashmir War, which was initiated by Muslim Sudhan ex-servicemen to fight for the accession of Jammu and Kashmir to the Dominion of Pakistan. On 15 June, Sardar Ibrahim Khan addressed a meeting in Rawalakot attended by 20,000 people, and gave a speech in "most 'seditious' terms". He told his audience that Pakistan, a Muslim state, was coming into being and the people of Jammu and Kashmir could not remain unaffected. After that day, he says, "a strange atmosphere took the place of the usually peaceful life in these parts". On 22 June, Chaudhary Hamidullah, the acting president of the Muslim Conference, visited Rawalakot and initiated secret plans to organize the ex-servicemen of the district for an eventual confrontation with the Jammu and Kashmir State Forces.

At Dothan an engagement took place on 30 August. A platoon on their way to Rawalakot to reinforce Hajira force, engaged in a clash with the Sudhan ex-servicemen nearly seven miles inland from Rawalakot, who were commanded by Captain Muhammad Ashraf. The engagement resulted in the casualties of five ex-servicemen which also included Captain Ashraf who suffered injuries and eighteen state forces soldiers. The action at Dothan destroyed culverts and communication network between Rawalakot and Hajira. At Sudhunti tehsil, the remaining Tain post was deserted by state forces, and Colonel Ram instead of reinforcing fallen or besieged posts would consider the withdrawal of both non-Muslim civilians and state forces to Rawalakot. The withdrawal of the state forces from this area was of great convenience for Azad forces, with the withdrawal whole area was turned into an Azad force base. On November 4,6,8 Attacks were made by Azad force on Rawalakot Garrison leading heavy casualties on both sides The Indian planes pounded the Azad forces all day but the Azad forces would remain unharmed.

Colonel Ram Lal took note of the circumstances and made the decision to withdraw his men to Poonch due to the dire situation regarding ammunition and supplies as well as the increasing number of refugees. But when the column arrived in Hajira, a fierce battle was ongoing. Azad forces had taken up positions on the way to Hajira as they anticipated the state forces would retreat from Hajira track, Lieutenant-Colonel Silwal instead decided to retreat to Poonch via the Toli Pir pass. The retreating state forces were persistently followed by Captain Hussain Khan and Azad forces all the way to Toli Pir, which left them with no breaks and impeding their attempts to reorganize or halt their progress. The column was brought back to Poonch which still caused casualties. There was only one unit in the garrison at Madarpur. A strong column was dispatched from Poonch on the evening of November 13/14 in order to withdraw these two garrisons, the garrisons would withdraw by 15 November. Azad forces forced the state forces to vacate Rawalakot and then to withdraw towards Poonch, the battle at Rawalakot was considered an important victory for Azad forces since it eliminated the whole area of state troops.

== Background ==
A fort called Rawalakot was built by the descendant of a famous ruler Sardar Mako Khan in Rawalakot and a court in the Rawalakot area was called Rahwala-kot was present According to locals and is believed that Rawalakot became famous because of a local ruler and the name was attributed to the forts in the locality.

In spring 1947 Sardar Ibrahim, the member of Legislative Assembly from Bagh–Sudhnoti, returned to Poonch after attending the Assembly session in March–April. By his own account, he was thoroughly convinced that there was a conspiracy between the State forces and the Rashtriya Swayamsevak Sangh and, so, he advised the people of Poonch to organize themselves politically. As a result of his exhortations, he states, people "got courage, became defiant, and started organizing themselves exactly on military lines". On 15 June, he addressed a meeting in Rawalakot attended by 20,000 people, and gave a speech in "most 'seditious' terms". He told his audience that Pakistan, a Muslim state, was coming into being and the people of Jammu and Kashmir could not remain unaffected. After that day, he says, "a strange atmosphere took the place of the usually peaceful life in these parts". On 22 June, Chaudhary Hamidullah, the acting president of the Muslim Conference, visited Rawalakot and initiated secret plans to organize the ex-servicemen of the district for an eventual confrontation with the State Forces.

Hussain Khan, would gather Muslim ex-army personnel and volunteers from the Second World war. However, very few joined Captain Hussain.

== Prelude ==
=== Prelude ===
On August 22, over 2000 individuals in Rawalakot requested that the state be admitted to Pakistan. Nonetheless, the people retracted their demands after the state administration called the leaders of the demanders and told them to stop. When the people of Bagh rejected orders, the situation got critical, and the leaders were captured. Following an apology, the leaders were promptly released. In the beginning of July, a no-tax campaign was launched in Bagh and Rawalakot, and by September, it went well. At Neelabutt a public meeting was conducted on August 23, 1947, Many important political figures demanded for Pakistani membership and denounced the Jammu and Kashmir state, they threatened to punish the Maharaja severely if he joined India. it faced suppression by the government.

Pakistani groups coordinated the 1,000-man march to Poonch from Arja in order to have their demands addressed. The groups were split into three and raided shops which were owned by Sikhs and Hindus. One party would stay in Arja, while the other two moved to Poonch and Hari Ghel. After being denied entry into Bagh on August 24, they spent the night near by. Some individuals in the Jatha (Note: The word Jatha means an armed parade mostly used for sikhs) had rifles, Balwan Singh therefore commanded a unit to reinforce the Bagh garrison. At Bagh the previous groups from Arja and Hari Ghel would join the jatha, bringing the total number of protestors to 2000. Colonel Krishna Singh, the Officer Commanding Raghupratap described the critical situation to the Chief-of-Staff over the phone, as well as the need for another battalion, which was instantly met, and one party was stationed in Bagh and one in Rawalakot on August 24–26. Many other gatherings of a similar nature were conducted, which gave rise to Bloodshed and repression by state forces. Section 144 was imposed by the State government, which banned the gathering of five or more persons on the 26th of August.

==== Bani Pissari and Arjah Incident ====
On 26 August, three state soldiers which were carrying supplies from Rawalakot for the troops present at Bagh and these soldiers were attacked by a group of four who took away all their supplies, Meanwhile, a public meeting was conducted at Hurabari. The news regarding Bani Pissari incident had been received by state garrison which consisted of a company, they responded by massacring the people present at Bani Pissari and the leaders present there would retreat informing others of the incident.

On 27 August Hussain Khan other notables were the guides from Dhirkot who advanced towards a state force detachment. In the Thob forest the detachment was brought under fire. This incident caused the state forces advance to be interrupted for a whole day. In retaliation a local mosque was ravaged and the home of Sardar Muhammad Abdul Qaiyum Khan's was razed to ground, who himself would escape to Pakistan. At Chirala and Chamankot military posts were set up and the state forces would conduct intense patrolling and forced extortion's.

==== Kharud Singh incident ====
An incident happened in Bagh tehsil on August 27, when a Muslim mob with the size of 500–600, seized Jemadar Khurd Singh and four state force signalers, tied them by hand and foot, and dumped them into the Mahal river. Two of them lost their lives by drowning, but Two were able to save themselves which included Jemadar Kharud Singh, who managed to release himself by swimming downstream. The news about the attack was received at Bagh. Captain Balwan Singh sent a reconnaissance group of 10 soldiers, which were halted by intense resistance offered and returned to the garrison.

== Battle & Events ==
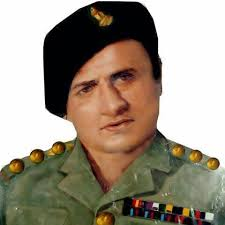
Captain Hussian Khan the leader of the (Azad forces/Mujahideen) during the battle of Rawalakot

=== Azad Forces preparations ===
The state administration was fully informed of the shortcomings to prevent the worsening situation in Jammu and Kashmir. The headquarters of Captain Hussain Khan was set up by him in Miral-gala close to Banjosa, and then organized a force. The force would face lack of weapons and ammunition.

=== Dothan Action ===
At Dothan an engagement took place on 30 August. The atrocities by state army at mung in the past were still remembered by locals, the majority of the district's dissolved ex-servicemen, the Sudhan ex-servicemen, covertly assembled and prepared for a confrontation with the state army. The State forces garrison at Rawalakot was established as a second army post, it was strengthened by a platoon recruited from Hajira. The platoon on their way to Rawalakot engaged in a clash with the Sudhan ex-servicemen nearly seven miles inland from Rawalakot, who were commanded by Captain Muhammad Ashraf. The engagement resulted in the casualties of five ex-servicemen which also included Captain Ashraf who suffered injuries and eighteen state forces soldiers. The action at Dothan destroyed culverts and communication network between Rawalakot and Hajira. A defensive position in the Dothan defile to block state forces reinforcement to Rawalakot was taken by Azad forces.

=== Battle ===
==== At Sudhunti Tehsil ====
The post at Mung sector consisted of a Middle school building and was brought under attack by Azad forces led by Subedar Afsar Khan with 30 volunteers on 6 October. The attack was repelled by State forces after a counterattack. Subedar Afsar Khan took his sword and led the volunteers into the building which resulted in a hand-to-hand fight after facing lack of weapons, All of them were killed. At Thorar Subedar Bostan Khan led the group of 36 ex-soldiers who attacked the state forces camp. The Thorar post was considered more valuable than at Mung sector due to the supply stored. damage was inflicted to state forces in the first attack and caused casualties, however attackers too were killed like at Mung. Three Locals from Nar, volunteered and rushed toward at the post at Thorar other's would follow them, the post would be captured by the attackers but the three volunteers would be killed including the remaining state troops at the Thorar post.

The Azad forces would gain substantial amount of supply stored at this post. Colonel Ram Lal would rush for relief after being informed of the attacks at posts in the Tehsil (Note: A Tehsil also known as (tahsil, taluk, or taluka) is a local unit of administrative division in India and Pakistan.) accompanied by a large column. Jemadar Bagga Khan of Hurna Mera led Eight soldier's of Azad forces and attacked the main-supply and ambushed the incoming relief forces which resulted in their considerable delay. The Tain post was deserted by state forces, and Colonel Ram instead of reinforcing fallen or besieged posts would consider the withdrawal of both non-Muslim civilians and state forces to Rawalakot. The withdrawal of the state forces from this area was of great convenience for Azad forces, with the withdrawal whole area was turned into an Azad force base.

==== At Rawalakot ====
Till 18 October no engagement occurred at Rawalakot, and the column led by Colonel Ram Lal's entered Rawalakot on 13 October. The village at Trar was attacked and completely ravaged by state forces, on their way to another village the state forces were forced to retreat after being engaged in a skirmish with Azad forces. The village of Barmung was pillaged by state forces on 21 October, the state forces were again forced to retreat after an attack on Pothi Makwalan the clash between the Azad forces and state forces, resulted in death of seventeen state troops and a personal was captured along with the supplies loaded on donkeys. On 19/20 October, Azad forces attacked Rawalakot. The Mosque in the area was besieged by state forces and kept their supplies and animal support in a bid that it would be left unharmed by Azad forces. A 3" mortar would be brought by Captain Hussain Khan and his Azad forces on foot, the mortar was bound with wooden poles to end the prolonged battle. Havildar Sanwala Khan took charge of the mortar. The first three shots by the mortar didn't bring expected results, all of them missed the enemy and one would hit another mosque. Accurate 3-inch mortar fire as well as medium machine guns assisted in the attack. There were significant casualties after the attack was repelled and a large ammunition expenditure on the state forces side.

The combat in the region went on until the following day, when the state forces were eventually defeated, the remaining survivors among the ones who were killed fled in the direction of Sangula. Azad forces gained control of a sizable amount of weapons, ammo, and supplies here, during the withdrawal of state forces Indian planes would bomb Azad forces locations which would result in five being killed. Hussain Khan requested for two volunteers to clear out remaining a state forces in the Civil Hospital. Akbar Shah and Painda Khan, two of them volunteered and successfully crawled to the place. Akbar grabbed a state forces soldier with lightning speed, and a hand-to-hand combat broke out. On November 4, 1947, Subedar Bostan Khan led the initial attack on Rawalakot, which was repelled by state forces, resulting in 45 casualties and 23 deaths for the Azad forces. A renewed attack was led by Captain Hussain Khan on November 6 which has said to inflict heavy losses on state troops. The Azad forces began bombarding the Rawalakot Garrison with relentless fire and the state force's outer defense was compromised.

The Indian planes pounded the Azad forces all day but the Azad forces would remain unharmed. On November 8, Captain Hussain Khan led another significant attempt. Colonel Ram Lal took note of the circumstances and made the decision to withdraw his men to Poonch due to the dire situation regarding ammunition and supplies as well as the increasing number of refugees. Colonel Ram's strategy called for the pullout to happen in two stages. A column under Major Amarnath's leadership, comprising B and D companies under the command of Major Ram Prakash and Arjun Dass, carrying 3,000 refugees headed towards Hajira, which was scheduled to depart Rawalakot on October 27. Their mission was to transport the refugees to the Hajira garrison, retrieve supplies and ammunition, and return the refugees to Rawalakot. But when the column arrived in Hajira, a fierce battle was ongoing.

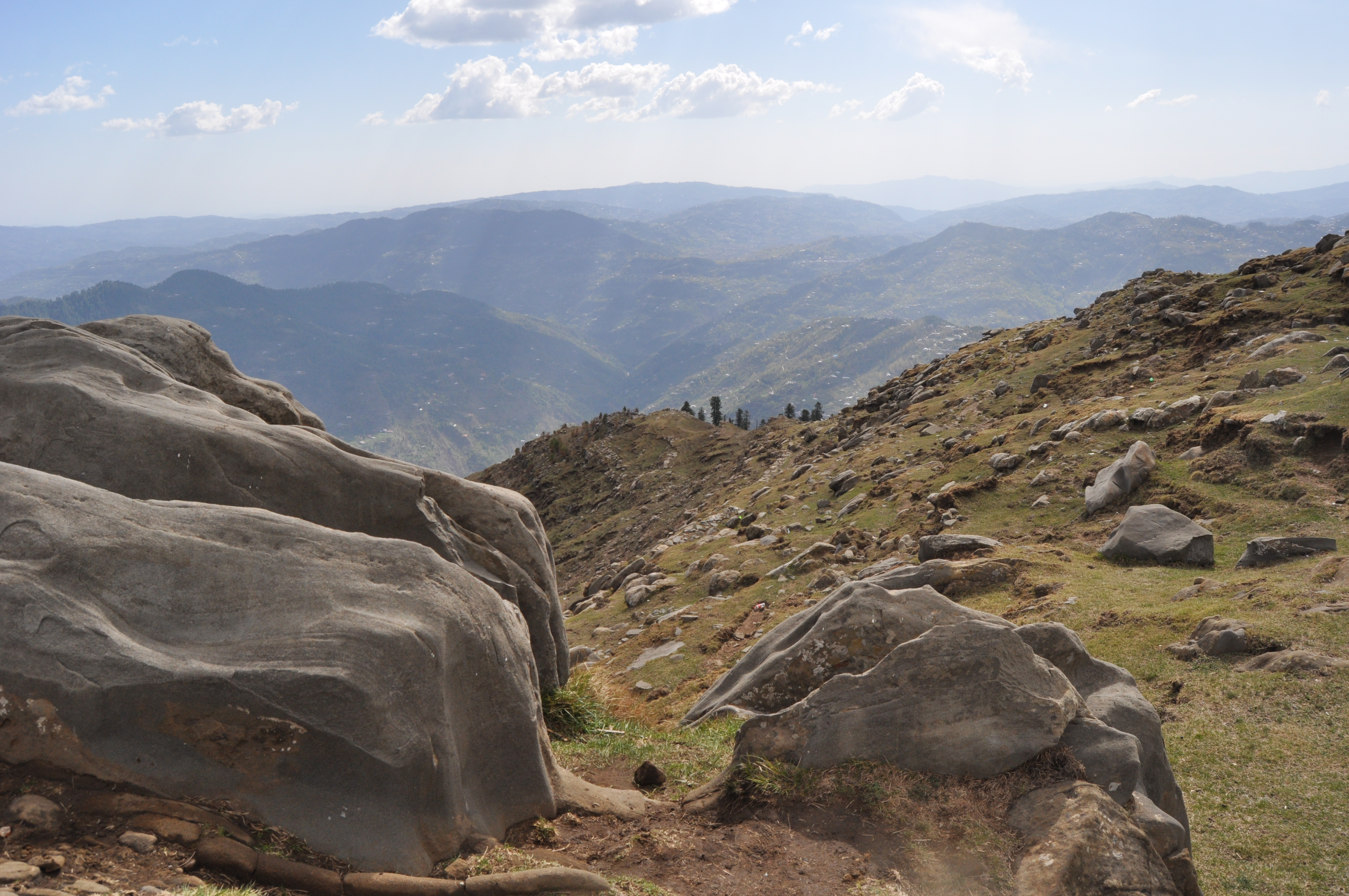
Image of Toli pir in Poonch district Azad Kashmir Pakistan

At Hajira Colonel Silwal was informed of immediate need for the return of the column and a strong attack, the column would then leave for Rawalakot for gathering supplies. The Azad forces would then carryout many ambushes which resulted in the state forces taking up three days and nights to advance to Rawalakot. It was difficult for the state soldiers to hold Rawalakot much longer due to a lack of supplies and ammunition from the daily combat with the enemy while it was under control. A Royal Indian Air Force (RIAF) fighter plane dropped a 1000 rounds of ammunition on November 5, but only around 600 of them could be recovered more than half of them were damaged. Decision was made to turn back to Poonch and leave Rawalakot. Azad forces had taken up positions on the way to Hajira as they anticipated the state forces would retreat from Hajira track, Lieutenant-Colonel Silwal instead decided to retreat to Poonch via the Toli Pir pass.

Toli pir which is one of the tallest peaks in the Poonch district which reached 10,000 feet, the advance of state forces towards Toli Pir peak was slowed down after leaving along Rawalakot together with the non-Muslim refugees. The retreating state forces were persistently and mercilessly followed by Captain Hussain Khan and Azad forces all the way to Toli Pir, which left them with no breaks and impeding their attempts to reorganize or halt their progress. The column was brought back to Poonch which still caused casualties. Following that, Hajira and Madarpur were the only positions in front of Poonch which were holding out. Under the leadership of Captain Vakil Singh of state forces garrison at Hajira was made up of a variety of sub-units, with a total strength of roughly two companies. There was only one unit in the garrison at Madarpur. A strong column was dispatched from Poonch on the evening of November 13/14 in order to withdraw these two garrisons, the garrisons would withdraw by 15 November.

== Aftermath ==
"The liberation of Rawalakot has great importance in the liberation Movement because with the fail of this Dogra strong-hold, they were not able to hold the advance of the liberators anywhere short of Poonch town. It not only meant the liberation of the present tehsils of Pallandari and Rawalakot but also cut off the enemy's forward base for the tehsil of Bagh."

— Muhammad Yusuf Saraf, Kashmiris Fight for Freedom, Volume 2 (2015), p. 161

Azad forces forced the state forces to vacate Rawalakot and then to withdraw towards Poonch, the battle at Rawalakot was considered an important victory for Azad forces since it eliminated the whole area of state troops. Following the ending of hostilities, the Karachi Agreement had established a cease-fire line in Kashmir. Poonch was divided between India and Pakistan, Rawalakot came under the Pakistani-administered Azad Kashmir, becoming the capital of Poonch Division and Poonch District.

== See also ==
- Indo-Pakistani war of 1947–1948
- Rawalakot
- Poonch District, Pakistan
- Battle of Pandu
- Battle of Muzaffarabad
- 1947 Gilgit rebellion
- Battle of Shalateng

== Sources ==
- Jaffri, Imran Haider (Winter 2024). "Captain Hussain Khan, Fakhr-i-Kashmir, OBI, shaheed: A Forgotten Hero of Kashmir Liberation War-1947/48". Bugle and Trumpet. 4 (2). Army Institute of Military History, Pakistan. Archived from the original on 2024-06-27.
- Ibrahim Khan, Muhammad (1990), The Kashmir Saga, Verinag
- Suharwardy, Abdul Haq (1983), Tragedy in Kashmir, Wajidalis
- Saraf, Muhammad Yusuf (2015) [first published 1979 by Ferozsons], Kashmiris Fight for Freedom, Volume 2, Mirpur: National Institute Kashmir Studies, archived from the original on 2021-03-29
- Singh, K. Brahma (2010) [first published Lancer International 1990], History of Jammu and Kashmir Rifles, 1820-1956: The State Force Background (PDF), brahmasingh.co.nf, ISBN 978-81-7062-091-4, archived from the original (PDF) on 6 March 2016
- Palit, D. K. (1972). Jammu and Kashmir Arms: History of the J & K Rifles. Palit & Dutt. ASIN B0006C8HKM. Archived from the original on 2000-01-20.
