= Hussain Khan (captain) =

Hussain Khan Fateh-e-Rawalakot
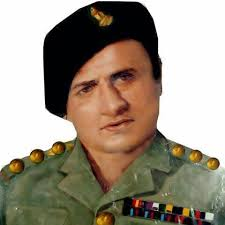
- Born: 1895; Kala Kot, Poonch, Jammu and Kashmir
- Died: November 11, 1947 (aged 51–52); Rawalakot, Azad Kashmir, Pakistan
- Military career
- Allegiance: British India (until 1947); Azad Kashmir
- Branch: British Indian Army; Azad Army
- Service years: 1913–1947
- Rank: Captain
- Nicknames: Fateh-e-Rawalakot; Eng. Lit.: (Liberator of Rawalakot)
- Conflicts: World War I; World War II; Burma campaign; First Kashmir War; Battle of Rawalakot †
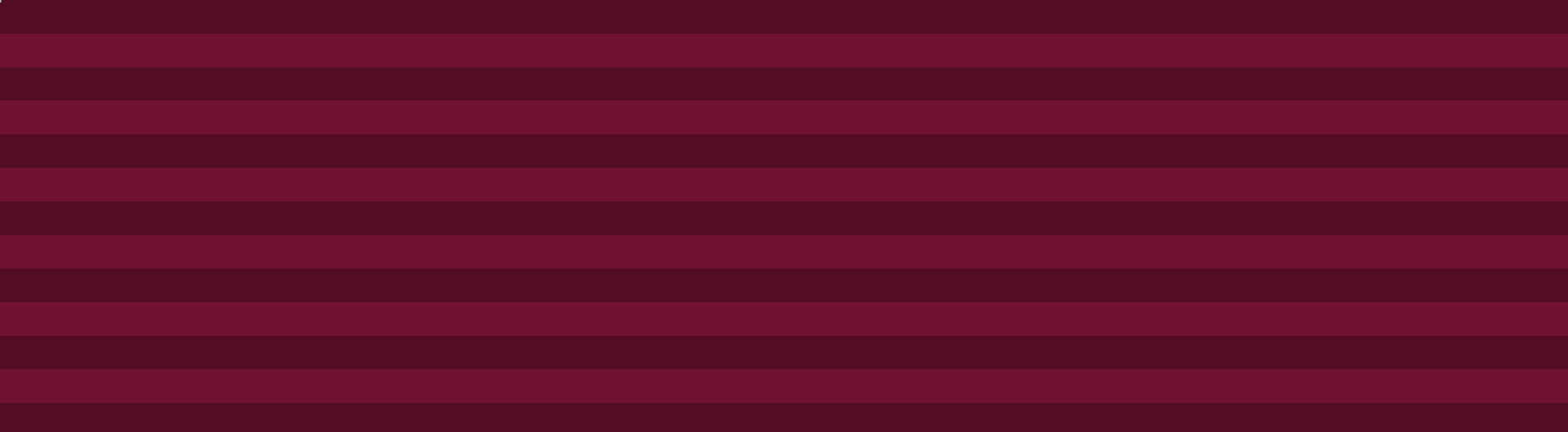
- Awards: Order of the British Empire Fakhr-i-Kashmir

Captain Hussain Khan (Urdu: کیپٹن حسین خان) was a prominent Sudhan soldier who fought most notably in the First Kashmir War in the Battle of Rawalakot against the forces of the Princely State of Jammu and Kashmir. Famously known as the liberator of Rawalakot

== Military career ==
=== World War I ===
At the age of 18, Khan enlisted in the British Indian Army in 1913. Khan served with the 2/123rd Outram's Rifles. For his services in the war, he was mentioned in dispatches in The London Gazette in 1921. He was also awarded the Order of the British Empire.

=== World War II ===
Khan served with the 9th Jat Regiment. During the Burma campaign, he was taken prisoner of war by the Japanese. He subsequently escaped Japanese captivity along with two other senior British officers.

=== Poonch Rebellion and First Kashmir War ===
Sometime before the outbreak of armed resistance during the rebellion, Dogras were out plundering and pillaging the area, a band trespassed into Hussain Khan's home and stole one of his sheep. Hussain Khan's wife who tried to prevent the robbery, was heckled. On coming home, Hussain Khan was agitated and vowed to take revenge. He joined the rebellion and recruited ex-servicemen and youth. Hussain Khan had a preference towards ex-servicemen of the Indian National Army, adding that since they had taken up arms against their British rulers, they were more suitable to fight their Dogra rulers as well. However, very few INA ex-servicemen were available in the area. Once the enlistment had completed, he had led some two hundred ex-servicemen to a nearby forest, he placed a copy of the Quran on the branch of a tree, and made them all pass beneath it, taking an oath of secrecy and sacrifice. He persuaded Col. Khan Muhammad Khan to donate a few thousand rupees and bought arms and ammunition from the tribal areas. After Hussain Khan and the Azad Forces succeeded in expelling the State Forces from Rawalakot, they pursued the retreating State Forces to Tolipir, frustrating their efforts to regroup. Near Tolipir, Hussain Khan was struck with a bullet and died on the spot.

== Legacy ==
Khan's native village of Kala Kot was renamed to Hussainkot in his honour. The Government of Azad Kashmir awarded him Fakhr-i-Kashmir posthumously on 27 March 1948, which is equivalent to Hilal-i-Jur'at.

Captain Hussain Shaheed’s role to get the people of AJK liberated from the oppressive rule of the Maharaja of Kashmir would never be overlooked or forgotten in the history of Kashmir.

— Masood Khan, The Express Tribune

== See also ==
- Burma campaign
- Indo-Pakistani war of 1947–1948
- Battle of Rawalakot
- Rawalakot
- Poonch District, Pakistan

== Sources ==
- Saraf, Muhammad Yusuf (2015) [first published 1979 by Ferozsons], Kashmiris Fight for Freedom, Volume 2, Mirpur: National Institute Kashmir Studies
