= Battle of Shalateng =

Part of the Indo-Pakistani War (1947)

- Part of the Indo-Pakistani war of 1947–1948
Date	7 November 1947
Location	Shalateng, Jammu and Kashmir 34.11176817436406°N 74.7472736372436°E
Result	Indian victory

Belligerents
India	Pakistan

Commanders and leaders
Brigadier Lionel Protip Sen; Lt Colonel Ranjit Singh Dyal	Khurshid Anwar

Units involved
1 Sikh; 1 Kumaon (Para); 4 Kumaon; 7th Light Cavalry	Pakistani Pashtun tribal militias

Strength
≈ 3,400 soldiers (4 Units)	≈ 1,000

The Battle of Shalateng was a military engagement on 7 November 1947, during the Indo-Pakistani war of 1947–1948. It was a decisive battle that resulted in the halting of the Pakistani offensive and the beginning of the Indian counter offensive.

== Build-up ==
The Battle of Badgam had taken place just 4 days earlier, in which the advance of Tribal lashkars of Pakistan was halted and the Srinagar airport was secured, allowing more forces to be flown in.

On 6 November, an aerial patrol observed a significant gathering of tribesmen in the Zainakot area near Shalateng village, facing the defences of 1 Sikh on the outskirts of Srinagar town. This group was observed engaging in digging activities, signalling preparations for an imminent assault on the town.

The plan was to encircle them through a flanking maneuver led by 1 Kumaon (Para) on the southern side of the Sikhs, and 4 Kumaon on the right flank. Early morning on 7 November, a squadron of four Daimler armoured cars of 7 Light Cavalry was inducted. Two armoured cars were deployed in support of 1 Sikh, and two were sent to reconnoitre, and positioned themselves behind the tribal lashkar forces.

== The battle ==
Once the tribesmen were surrounded, the Indian forces opened up and strafing air support was also provided by Spitfires of the Airforce. The tribesmen were taken by surprise and broke ranks and fled, leaving over 600 dead and much of their arms, ammunition and equipment.

== Aftermath ==
The Pakistani raiders fled with the Indian Army in hot pursuit. By evening, 1 Sikh had recaptured Pattan, and at around midnight, 1 Kumaon (Para) along with the armoured cars and a troop of 25 pounder guns advanced towards Baramulla, which was occupied by 5.30 pm on 8 November. By 13 November, territory up to Uri was recaptured and Kashmir Valley was brought firmly in India's control.

== See also ==
Indo-Pakistani war of 1947–1948

- Operation Easy
- Battle of Pandu
- Operation Bison 1948
- Battle of Chunj
- Battle of Muzaffarabad
