= Battle of Muzaffarabad =

Battle of the Indo-Pakistani War of 1947-1948

- Part of the Indo-Pakistani War of 1947–1948
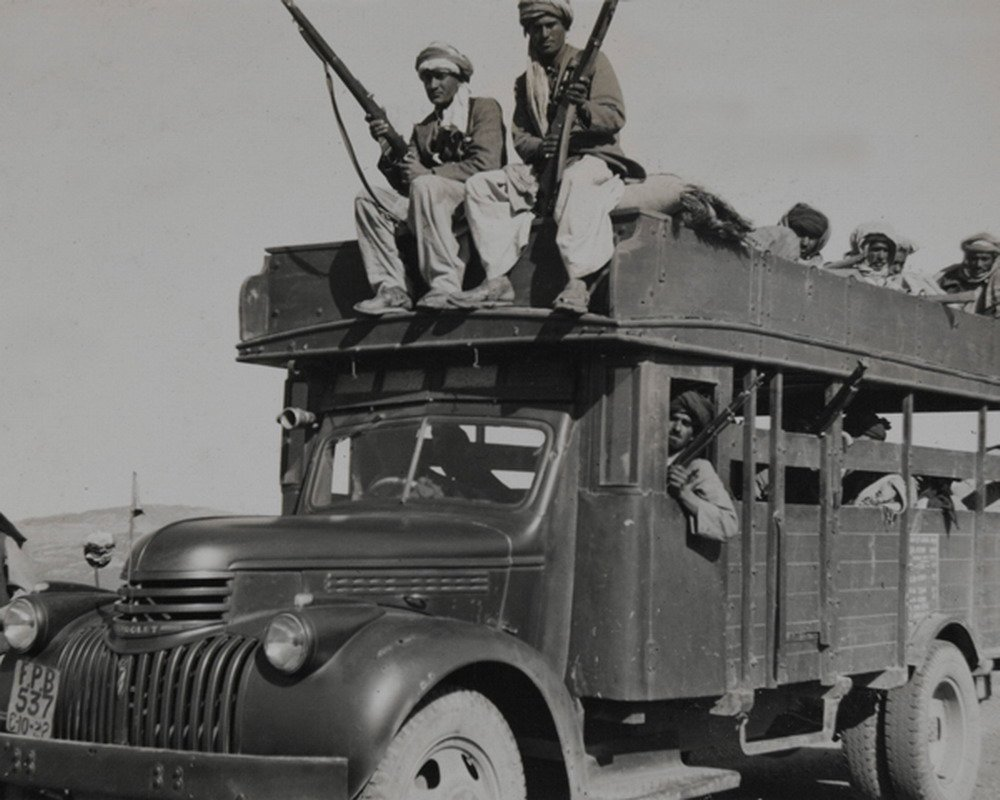
- Pashtun tribesmen heading to battle in Kashmir, Indo-Pakistani War of 1947-1948
Date	22 October 1947
Location	Muzaffarabad, Jammu and Kashmir
Result	Pakistani victory: Massacre of Hindu and Sikh civilians ensues
Territorial changes	Muzaffarabad annexed by Pakistan, becomes capital of Azad Kashmir

Belligerents
Pakistan	Jammu and Kashmir

Commanders and leaders
Akbar Khan; Khurshid Anwar; Zaman Kiani; Tufail Mohammad; Nasir Khan; Babar Khan (Note: Defected from the Jammu and Kashmir State Forces to the Pakistani side)	Rajinder Singh; Sultan Ahmed Khan; Narain Singh Sambyal †; Hira Lal Atal

Units involved
Pashtun tribal militias: Wazir militiamen; Mehsud militiamen; Turi militiamen; Afridi militiamen; Mohmand militiamen; Swati militiamen; Yusufzai militiamen; Jadoon militiamen; Muslim League National Guard (Azad Kashmir) Muslim Mutineers of the Jammu and Kashmir State Forces; Supported by: Pakistan Army	Jammu and Kashmir State Forces: 2nd Battalion; D Company; E Company; F Company; Jammu and Kashmir Mountain Train Battery

Strength
4,000	500

Casualties and losses
- 5,000-7,000 Hindu & Sikh civilians killed in the aftermath

The Battle of Muzaffarabad was fought between Pakistani-backed Pashtun tribesmen and pro-Pakistani Kashmiri rebels, and the Jammu and Kashmir State Forces in the town of Muzaffarabad on 22 October 1947. The battle saw the swift defeat of the Jammu and Kashmir State Forces and the capture of Muzaffarabad by these tribesmen.

== Prelude ==
Upon the independence of India and Pakistan in August 1947, would see the Partition of India and the displacement of 10-20 million people. The princely states that were once in a subsidiary alliance with the British Empire were given three choices: join India, join Pakistan, or remain Independent.

=== Situation in Kashmir ===
In the princely state of Jammu and Kashmir, Hari Singh, the Maharaja of Kashmir, chose to remain independent of both India and Pakistan. Hari Singh was an unpopular ruler, with the majority of his population being Muslim, while he was a Hindu. In the Poonch district, Muslim leaders such as Sardar Ibrahim Khan and Abdul Qayyum Khan began defying the Maharaja first by political means, before arming themselves into a full-scale rebellion.

In August 1947, mass unrest broke out in the Poonch district, as Hari Singh sent State forces under the command of Henry Lawrence Scott. By September 1947, Sardar Ibrahim Khan and other rebels escaped to Pakistan, seeking Pakistani intervention and to acquire arms.

=== Operation Gulmarg ===
On September 12, Liaquat Ali Khan, the Prime Minister of Pakistan, called a meeting with numerous Kashmiri and Pakistani political and military leaders. According to Indian military sources, the Pakistani army planned an operation called "Operation Gulmarg" as an armed intervention in Kashmir without the consent of the government. As per this Operation, 20 tribal units called lashkars would invade Kashmir in numerous areas. Each lashkar would be composed of 1,000 tribal irregulars trained by the Pakistani army. Ten would be sent to aid the rebels in Poonch and were to advance to Jammu, while another ten would invade Muzaffarabad. The Pashtun force under Khurshid Anwar had high morale and were motivated by the prospects of a holy jihad and the riches and treasures they could receive.

"The Khyber Agency and its adjacent tribal areas, located on the border with Afghanistan, contributed the maximum number of fighters to 'liberate' Kashmir from kafirs (infidels). The Pathan tribesmen, considered as 'the most troublesome and feared population on the sub-continent', were primarily motivated by the lure of women, money and land and the excitement of combat, which always had a great appeal for the fearless tribes. Added to this was the promise of a heavenly kingdom for those who fought to uphold the religious duty of jihad against a repressive 'infidel regime'. The ulema (Islamic scholars) in the North-West Frontier Province issued fatwas (religious decrees) for waging jihad in Kashmir."

— Khuram Iqbal, Umair Pervez Khan, Why the First Kashmir Insurrection Failed, p. 108

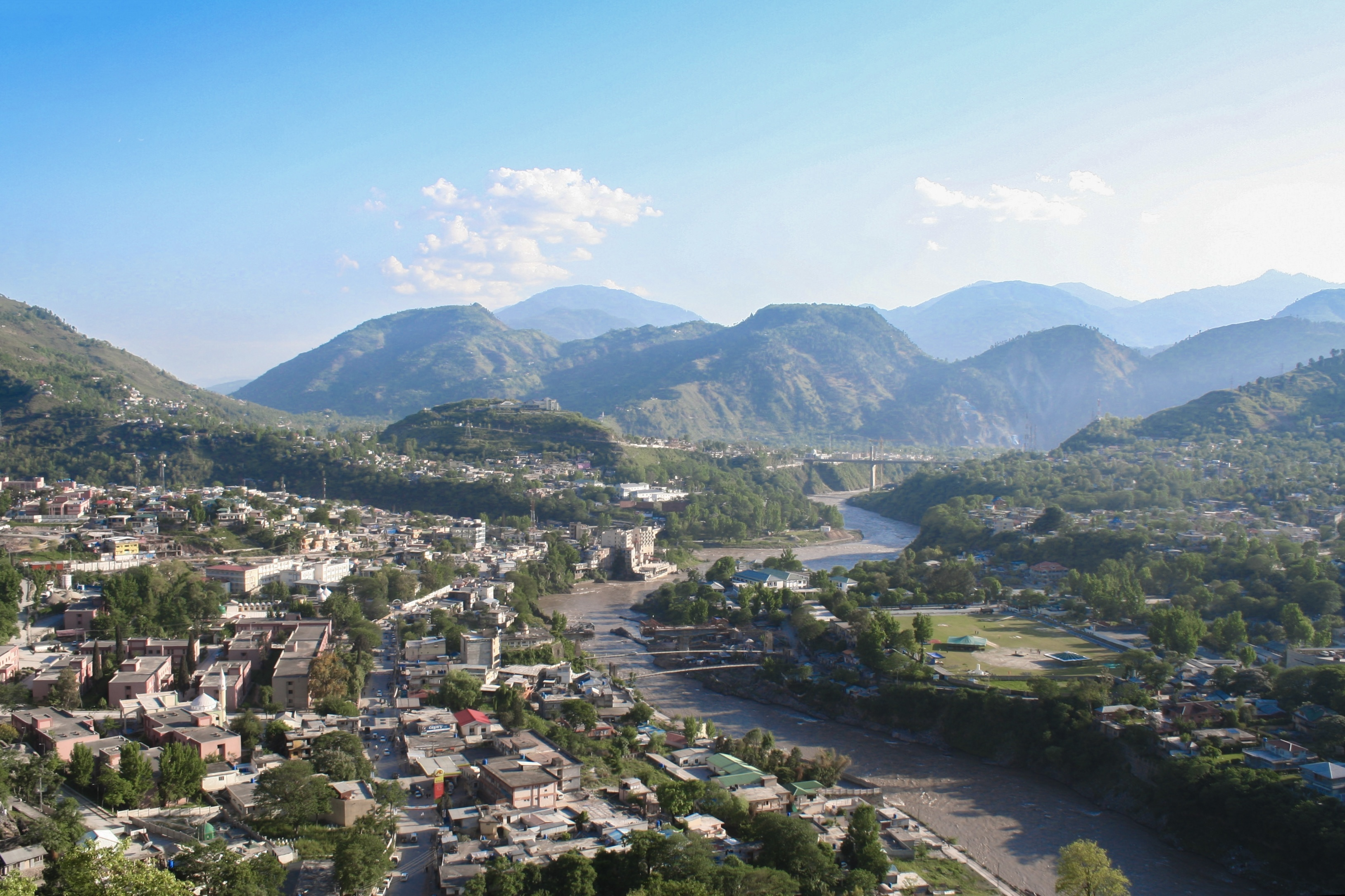
Muzaffarabad in present-day

== Invasion ==
On October 21, 1947, Khurshid Anwar, leader of the Muslim League National Guard, crossed the border into Kashmir with 4,000 Pashtun tribesmen aimed to take Muzaffarabad. The invasion route saw a group of footmen who were experienced with the area cross in columns from Dub Gali, however the bulk of the invasion from the frontier tribesmen crossed via the longer route through Lohar Gali in armoured vehicles and lorries. The invasion caught the Kashmiri defenders by surprise, as they had not anticipated the tribal invasion. The Kashmiri defenders also suffered from mutiny and mass desertion by its Muslim personnel. Brigader Ranijer Singh, overall commander of the front, dispatched the D, E, and F companies of the Second Battalion as reinforcements to defend Domel. Major Hira Lal Atal commanded a mountain artillery battery to provide artillery support. Additional reinforcements from Srinagar were sent although they did not reach Muzaffarabad in time. The Jammu and Kashmir State Forces within the Muzaffarabad were only around 500 strong and were unable to repel the tribal invasion, the town quickly fell opening up the route to Uri and Baramulla.

== Aftermath ==
Upon the fall of Muzaffarabad, the Pashtun tribesmen remained in the town for 3 days before preparing to move onto Srinagar, their ultimate objective. After the victory, the tribesmen were invited at dinner by Muhammad Aslam Khan Swati, a Khan of Garhi Habibullah and leading figure of this war.

=== Looting and pillaging ===
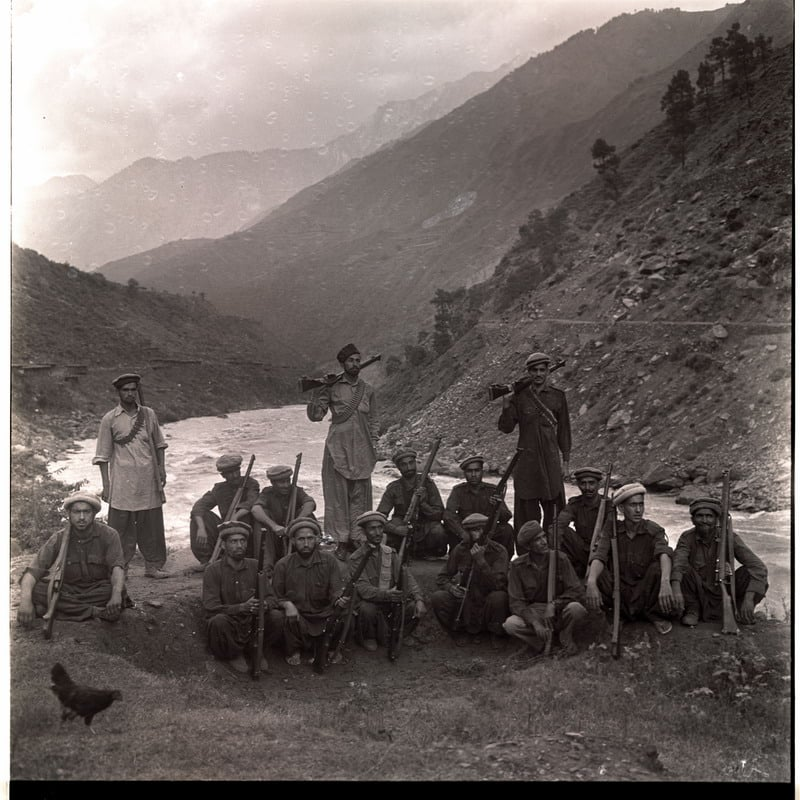
Pashtun tribesmen in Kashmir, 1947.

The Pashtun tribesmen in Muzaffarabad spent three days looting and pillaging the town, killing non-Muslims and enslaving non-Muslim women. Gohar Rahman, a Pashtun tribesmen and veteran of World War II who took part in the invasion stated,

"They plundered the state armoury, set entire markets on fire and looted their goods, they shot everyone who couldn't recite the kalima - the Arabic-language Muslim declaration of faith. Many non-Muslim women were enslaved, while many others jumped in the river to escape capture."Muslim women would sometimes offer us food but the Pathans were reluctant to accept, thinking it may be poisoned. They would instead capture those people's goats and sheep, slaughter them and roast the meat on fire."

=== Mass killing of Hindus and Sikhs ===
Upon the capture of Muzaffarabad by the Pashtun tribesmen, who were jubilant over their victory and preparing to advance on Srinagar, had begun to exterminate and slaughter the non-Muslim population in Muzaffarabad. Larry Collins and Dominique Lapierre state in reference to the killing of the Hindus in Muzaffarabad,

"The young leader of the invasion's advance guard was jubilant. The operation could not have been more successful. The route to Srinagar lay open before the Pathans, 135 miles of paved, undefended road, a promenade without danger they could complete before daybreak... The young man was quickly disabused of his dream. The strategists who had conceived this invasion had made one fatal miscalculation. When Sairab Khan wanted to set his force on the road to Srinagar, he discovered it had disappeared. There was not a single Pathan around his vehicles. They had faded into the night. Their crusade to deliver their Moslem brothers of Kashmir had begun with a nocturnal excursion to the Hindu bazaar of Muzaffarabad."

— Freedom at Midnight, p. 351

=== Political aftermath ===
On October 24, Sardar Ibrahim Khan declared the Provisional Government of Azad Jammu and Kashmir. The lashkars continued their advance to Uri and Baramulla, with some reaching the outskirts of Srinagar. On the same day, Hari Singh requested assistance from the Indian government, however they would only agree to aid the Maharaja if he acceded to India. On the 26th of October, Jammu and Kashmir was acceded to India on 26 October 1947 and Indian troops were transported by air to Srinagar by the next day.

== See also ==
- Indo-Pakistani War of 1947–1948
- Battle of Rawalakot
- Azad Kashmir
- Muzaffarabad
- Indo-Pakistani wars and conflicts
- Kashmir conflict
- Kashmir
