= Khurshid Anwar (Major) =

Pakistani activist and militant

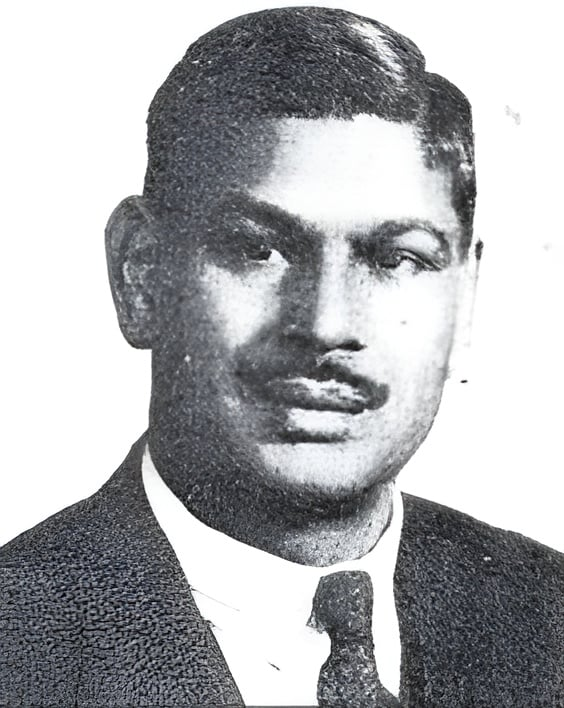
- Portrait, Khurshid Anwar

2nd President Pakistan Football Federation
- In office 1948–1949
- Preceded by: Fazlur Rehman
- Succeeded by: Khawaja Shahabuddin

Personal details
- Born: Mian Khurshid Anwar; 27 February 1902 Punjab, British India
- Died: 1950 (aged 47–48)
- Cause of death: Blood poisoning
- Resting place: Rawalpindi War Cemetery, Rawalpindi, Pakistan
- Spouse: Mumtaz Jamal
- Education: Aligarh Muslim University
- Known for: Commanding Tribal lashkars during the First Kashmir War

Military service
- Allegiance: (British Raj) British India; Pakistan
- Branch/service: (British Raj) British Indian Army; Muslim League National Guards
- Years of service: 1940—1947
- Rank: Major
- Battles/wars: World War II; Indo-Pakistan War 1947-1948; Battle of Muzaffarabad; Battle of Badgam (WIA)

Khurshid Anwar (27 February 1902 – 1950) was an activist of All-India Muslim League, heading its private militia, the Muslim League National Guards. Described as a "shadowy figure" and "complete adventurer", he is generally addressed as a "Major." He was a key figure in the rise of the Muslim League during 1946–1947, organising its campaigns in Punjab and North-West Frontier Province, prior to India's partition. After the independence of Pakistan, he was instrumental in organising the tribal invasion of princely state of Kashmir, leading to the First Kashmir War.

== Early career ==
Khurshid Anwar was born on 27 February 1902. He was a Punjabi from Jalandhar, according to some sources, or from Kapurthala, according to others. Sources also conflict on his tribal lineage, linking him to both the Arain and Kakazai tribes. Anwar has been described as a "shadowy figure", a "complete adventurer", and the "Muslim League's most important secret weapon in the creation of Pakistan".

Anwar is said to have worked in the civil supplies department in Delhi prior to World War II. During World War II, Anwar was emergency commissioned as a second lieutenant into the Ordnance Corps' Supply Department of the British Indian Army on the 21 September 1940. He was appointed as a deputy controller of purchase. Anwar also reportedly served as a guard in a railway battalion during the war.

By 1943, Captain Anwar was promoted to temporary major and made a member of the administration staff of the Ordnance Corps. He was eventually suspected of bribe-taking and supplying goods to civilians. This ended his association with the Army.

A source also briefly states that Anwar once served Kapurthala State Forces.

== Muslim League National Guards ==
The All-India Muslim League had a volunteer militia called the Muslim League National Guards (MLNG), originally headed by Siddique Ali Khan. Khurshid Ahmed served as the second-in-command. According to scholar Ayesha Jalal, Khurshid Anwar was appointed as the commander (Salar) of MLNG in October 1946. He was given a target of rising 200,000 volunteers. Anwar is said to have devoted 'considerable energy' to the effort, impressing upon the League workers the danger posed by the Rashtriya Swayamsevak Sangh, which was, in his view, financed by the Indian National Congress. By the end of 1946, the National Guards ranks swelled to 60,000 members. The 1946 Bihar riots were instrumental in mobilising the Muslims of India to activism. After he was appointed by Jinnah to lead the group, one intelligence report read, ‘Instruction is being given in the art of knife and acid throwing, and in the use of fire-arms.'

When the Muslim League led a civil disobedience movement against the Unionist government of Punjab, vexing its prime minister Khizar Hayat Tiwana, Tiwana banned the Muslim League National Guards in January 1947. But Anwar went underground to keep the agitation going. Under his leadership, the National Guards blew up bridges and railway lines during the Punjab civil disobedience campaign. Eventually the Unionist government was overthrown.

Afterwards, Anwar went to the North-West Frontier Province, where he worked with the Muslim League leaders Khan Abdul Qayyum Khan and Pir of Manki Sharif to launch a direct action campaign against the Congress government. He is said to have organised an underground movement publishing cyclostyled newspapers and broadcasting on a wireless transmitter. Anwar's rallies led to attacks on the local communities of Hindus and Sikhs, generating a stream of refugees into Kashmir, which closed off any possibility of the Maharaja of Kashmir acceding to Pakistan. Anwar is also said to have gotten away with a good deal of loot from his attacks on the minorities.

== Invasion of Kashmir ==
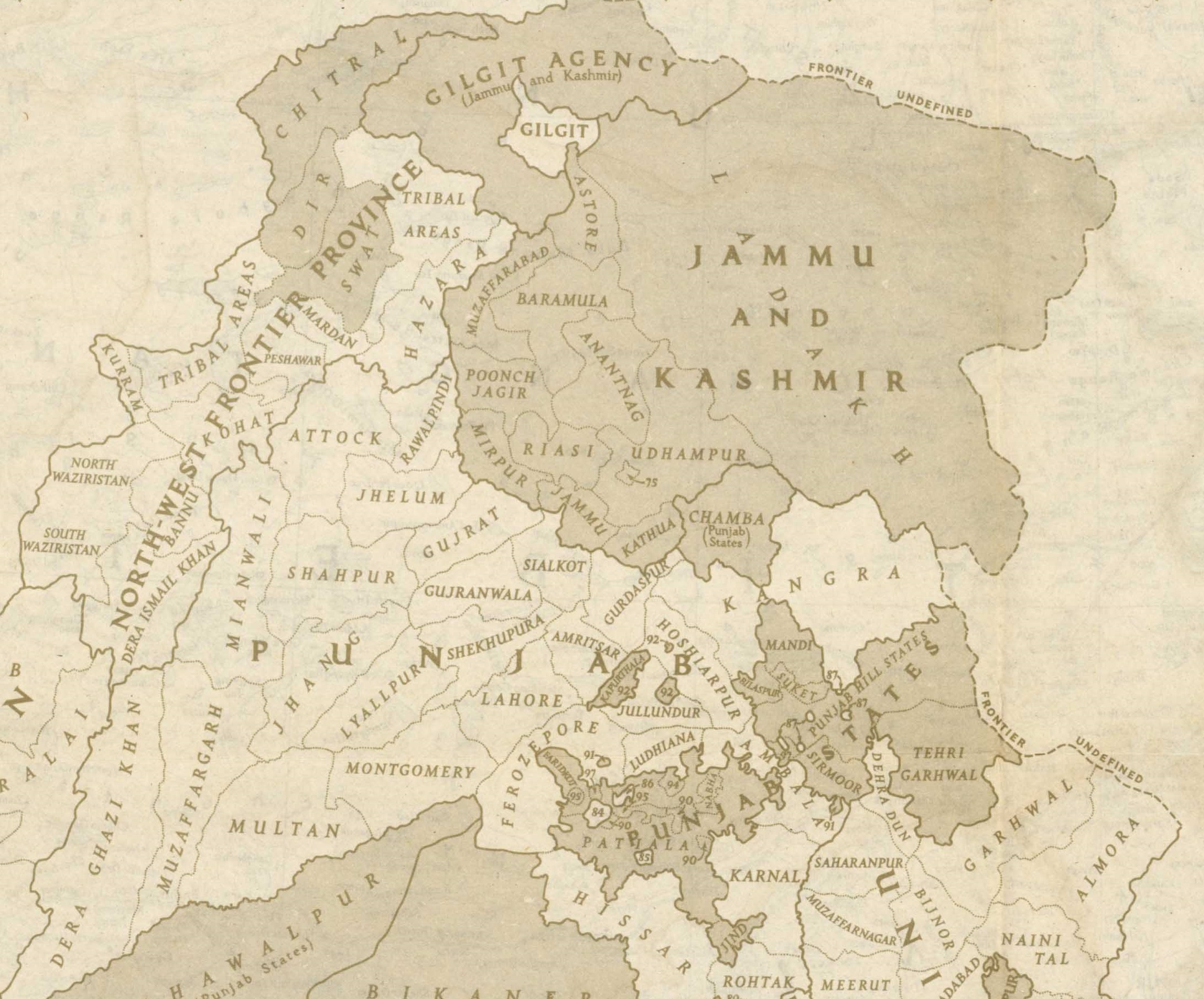
The princely state of Kashmir, Punjab Province and the North-West Frontier Province including the princely states of Chitral, Swat and Dir and Frontier Tribal agencies in 1946, a year before partition and first Kashmir war.

On 12 September 1947, the Pakistani Prime Minister Liaquat Ali Khan held a meeting in Lahore to formulate a strategy for capturing Kashmir. In addition to Khurshid Anwar, the meeting was attended by Punjab politicians Mian Iftikharuddin and Sardar Shaukat Hayat Khan, Colonel Akbar Khan, Major General Zaman Kiani. A three-pronged approach was decided at the meeting, for Akbar Khan to organise the rebellion inside Kashmir, General Kiani to organise an invasion from the south using former Indian National Army personnel, and for Anwar to organise an invasion via Muzaffarabad using activists from Pakistan.

According to Shaukat Hayat Khan, no decision was made at the 12 September meeting to involve Pashtun tribes. He claims that he had explicitly ordered Anwar not to involve them, and that Anwar had 'disobeyed' by recruiting the Mahsud tribesmen of Waziristan. There were other meetings however, Around 20 September, Kashmir's Muslim Conference leaders were summoned to a meeting in Lahore, where Shaukat Hayat Khan was present along with the premier of the North-West Frontier Province (NWFP), Abdul Qayyum Khan. Anwar's allies in the NWFP for the organisation of the tribal invasion were Abdul Qayyum Khan, the Pir of Wana and the Pir of Manki Sharif. Both the Pirs had wanted to launch a jihad against Kashmir to free their Muslim brethren from Hindu rule.

According to Shaukat Hayat Khan, they had fixed a 'D-day' in September, but discovered that Anwar had married a Muslim League worker in Peshawar and disappeared on a honeymoon. His wife, Begum Mumtaz Jamal was said to be a Kashmiri Pathan: her father was a Kashmiri while her mother was a Swati.

Anwar himself has given other 'D-days': 15 October in one instance, and 21 October in another. Eventually, the invasion did take place on 22 October.

With the help of the NWFP Chief Minister Khan Abdul Qayyum Khan, the divisional commissioner Khawaja Abdur Rahim of Rawalpindi and the political agents of the tribal agencies, Anwar mobilised Afridis from the Khyber Agency and Mehsuds from the Waziristan Agency. They were further joined by Wazirs, Daurs, Bhittanis, Khattaks, Turis, Swatis and men of Dir. Trucks belonging to the paramilitary Frontier Corps were used to transport them to the Kashmir border.

On 22 October 1947, Anwar entered Kashmir near Muzaffarabad heading a lashkar of 4,000 tribesmen. They quickly secured Muzaffarabad, took Uri and proceeded to Baramulla. At each location, they stopped to plunder the local population, especially the Hindus and Sikhs. It was part of their arrangement with Anwar; "they had no other remuneration," according to Colonel Akbar Khan. When they reached Baramulla, a rich provincial capital, their desire for loot was overwhelming, and they stopped listening to Anwar's orders. Anwar and some of the tribal elders grew deeply ashamed of what was done in Baramulla.

The tribal lashkar stopped in Baramulla for two days, during which the Maharaja of Jammu and Kashmir negotiated his accession to India and India air-lifted troops to Srinagar. According to some accounts, Anwar asked for an undertaking from the tribal leaders to abstain from looting, respect government property and protect treasuries. The tribesmen are said to have refused. Scholar Andrew Whitehead states that Anwar appears to have summoned political and religious leaders of the tribesmen to instil discipline in them. The Pir of Manki Sharif himself was among them.

On 29 October, Governor George Cunningham of NWFP claims to have convinced Mohammad Ali Jinnah of providing better support to the tribal lashkar. Consequently, the government decided to maintain a contingent of 5,000 tribesmen in Kashmir, provide their rations and ammunition, and establish a directing committee of five officials in Abbottabad to control recruitment and supplies. A battalion of troops was also sent to maintain order among tribesmen.

After the tribesmen advanced again, about 1,000 of them reached Budgam by 3 November, which was within five miles of the Srinagar airfield. Here they were engaged by Indian troops. According Brigadier L. P. Sen of the Indian Army, the tribesmen failed to press home their advantage in reaching the airfield. Anwar states that he reached within one mile of the airfield along with twenty men, but lacked the strength to press forward. Around 6 November, Srinagar was exposed to its closest encounter with war as the city "reverberated to the sound of machine-gun and mortar firing". Three hundred tribesmen faced a roadblock of the Indian Army 4.5 km west of the city, and engaged in a pitched battle in the early hours of the morning. By dawn, they were repulsed. The tribesmen then gathered at Shalateng, northwest of Srinagar. The Indians deployed newly arrived armoured cars and air support. The tribesmen were routed, with heavy casualties, and dispersed. The Indians pursued them and recaptured Pattan, Baramulla and Uri within the next few days.

During the Battle of Badgam around 10 November, Anwar was injured in the leg by a bomb splinter. Colonel Akbar Khan took over the command of the tribal lashkar.

== Later life and death ==
Anwar served as president of the Pakistan Football Federation between 1948 and 1949. He later established an ice factory in Rawalpindi. Anwar was seriously wounded during the Battle of Badgam, leading to long-term blood poisoning resulted in his death in 1950.

== Bibliography ==
- Dalrymple, Sam (2025). Shattered Lands: Five Partitions and the Making of Modern Asia (1st ed.). HarperCollins. ISBN 978-93-6989-485-7.
- Saraf, Muhammad Yusuf (2015) [first published 1979 by Ferozsons]. Kashmiris Fight for Freedom, Volume 2. Mirpur: National Institute Kashmir Studies.
- Hajari, Nisid (2015). Midnight's Furies: The Deadly Legacy of India's Partition. Houghton Mifflin Harcourt. ISBN 978-0-547-66924-3.
- Hiro, Dilip (2015). The Longest August: The Unflinching Rivalry Between India and Pakistan. Nation Books. ISBN 978-1-56858-503-1.
- Jamal, Arif (2009). Shadow War: The Untold Story of Jihad in Kashmir. Melville House. ISBN 978-1-933633-59-6.
- Nawaz, Shuja (May 2008). "The First Kashmir War Revisited". India Review. 7 (2): 115–154. doi:10.1080/14736480802055455. S2CID 155030407.
- Whitehead, Andrew (2007). A Mission in Kashmir. Penguin. ISBN 978-0-670-08127-1.
- Talbot, Phillips (2007). An American Witness To India's Partition. SAGE Publishing India. ISBN 978-93-5150-018-6.
- Panigrahi, Devendra (2004). India's Partition: The Story of Imperialism in Retreat. Routledge. ISBN 978-1-135-76813-3.
- Jha, Prem Shankar (2003). The Origins of a Dispute: Kashmir 1947. Oxford University Press. ISBN 978-0-19-566486-7.
- Schofield, Victoria (2003) [First published in 2000]. Kashmir in Conflict. London and New York: I. B. Taurus & Co. ISBN 1860648983.
- Jalal, Ayesha (2002). Self and Sovereignty: Individual and Community in South Asian Islam Since 1850. Routledge. ISBN 978-1-134-59937-0.
- Lamb, Alastair (2002) [first published 1997 by Roxford Books]. Incomplete Partition: The Genesis of the Kashmir Dispute, 1947–1948. Oxford: Oxford University Press. ISBN 9780195797701.
- Amin, Maj Agha Humayun (1999). "The 1947–48 Kashmir War: The war of lost opportunities". The Pakistan Army Till 1965. Strategicus and Tactitus.
- Schofield, Victoria (1997). "Kashmir – Today, Tomorrow?". Asian Affairs. 28 (3): 315–324. doi:10.1080/714857150.
- Schofield, Victoria (1996). Kashmir in Conflict: India, Pakistan and the Unending War. Bloomsbury Academic. ISBN 978-1-86064-036-0.
- Talbot, Ian (1996). Freedom's Cry: The Popular Dimension in the Pakistan Movement and Partition Experience in North-West India. Oxford University Press. ISBN 019-577657-7 – via archive.org.
- Lamb, Alastair (1991). Kashmir: A Disputed Legacy, 1846–1990. Roxford Books. ISBN 978-0-907129-05-9.
