= Battle of Badgam =

Battle between India and Pakistan in 1947

- Part of Indo-Pakistani War of 1947–1948
Date	3 November 1947
Location	Budgam district, Jammu and Kashmir 34.0179°N 74.7256°E
Result	Indian victory

Belligerents
India	Pakistan

Commanders and leaders
Somnath Sharma †; Dewan Singh †	Khurshid Anwar (WIA)

Units involved
Indian Armed Forces: Indian Army; Air Force	Tribal lashkars (Note: The term "lashkar" in this context means a group of a thousand tribals of one ethnicity from North West Frontier Province, armed by Pakistani Army and encouraged to infiltrate and raid Kashmir for booty.)

Strength
50–70 troops Unknown amount of IAF Aircraft	~1,000 men

Casualties and losses
15–22 killed 26 wounded	200–300 killed

The Battle of Badgam was a defensive encounter that took place at Badgam (or Budgam) in the Kashmir Valley close to the Srinagar Airport during the initial stages of Indo-Pakistani war of 1947–1948. The skirmishes took place on 3 November 1947 between a company of the Indian Army, aided by Indian Air Force, and a tribal lashkar of Pakistani raiders numbering around 1,000 who had apparently occupied Badgam. The battle drew its significance from the success of the solitary company of 4th Battalion, Kumaon Regiment, led by Major Somnath Sharma, in halting the momentum of advancing tribal "lashkars", though being heavily outnumbered which led the Indian Army to successfully secured outskirts of Srinagar. Sharma was awarded the Param Vir Chakra posthumously for his actions. The Indian Air Force served as an accompaniment to the army's efforts in the battle, contributing to the majority of the casualties inflicted on the Pakistani lashkars. This battle was followed by the decisive Battle of Shalateng.

== Backdrop ==
The battle took place at a point when Indian troops had just begun their fly-in into Srinagar airfield during the opening stages of the war. The lashkar were advancing along three axes – north of Wular Lake, along the main Muzaffarabad-Baramulla-Pattan-Srinagar axis, and Gulmarg. Along the Gulmarg route, a lashkar of 700 raiders was known to be approaching Badgam but no contact had been made with it. The lashkar would soon be in a position to seize the airfield and block the induction of Indian troops by air. Alternatively, they could bypass the Pattan defenses from the south and reach Srinagar unhindered.

At that moment, only a weak brigade of Indian troops, withdrawn from refugee protection duties in Punjab and hastily airlifted, stood between groups of tribal lashkars advancing towards Srinagar. Indian troops were deployed only at Srinagar airfield, Magam and Pattan. A detachment of Mahraja's Bodyguard (State Forces cavalry) reconnoitered north of Wular Lake.

== Patrol plan ==
Brigadier L. P. Sen, newly arrived commander of 161 Infantry Brigade decided to send a strong fighting patrol to the hills overseeing Badgam village 5 km west of it. The task of the patrol was to search the area in the vicinity of Badgam and the area between Badgam and Magam for signs of the infiltrating Pakistanis. The patrol was to comprise two companies of the 4th Battalion of the Kumaon Regiment (4 Kumaon), reinforced with a company from the regiment's 1st Battalion (1 Kumaon). The 1 Kumaon company was tasked to patrol ahead of Badgam by bounds, and link up with 1st Battalion, Punjab Regiment (1 Punjab) at Magam after which it would return by road. If no contact was made, the 4 Kumaon companies would fall back one by one, vacating Badgam at 1400 hrs.

== Battle of Badgam ==
On 3 November 1947, Major Somnath Sharma, commanding D Company of 4 Kumaon, led the patrol. The patrol proceeded as planned without incident till the time came for withdrawing from Badgam. Sharma was ordered to fall back one company at a time, one company at 1400 hrs and he along with his company at 1500 hrs. At 1430 hrs, the movement of tribals was seen to the west and near Badgam village. Sharma correctly surmised the movement in Badgam village was meant to divert attention while the attack would come in from the west. The lashkar attacked from the west. Sharma's company was soon surrounded by the enemy from three sides and sustained heavy casualties from the ensuing mortar bombardment. Sharma realized the importance of holding onto his position as both the city of Srinagar and the airport would be vulnerable if it were lost.

The Indian air forced played a major role in the battle, and caused the majority of Pakistani casualties.

Under heavy fire and outnumbered seven to one, he urged his company to fight bravely, often exposing himself to danger as he ran from post to post. Despite the forward two platoons falling, Sharma desperately clung to his position with the depth platoon.

While he was busy fighting the enemy, a mortar shell exploded on the ammunition near him. His last message to Brigade HQ received a few moments before he was killed was:

"The enemies are only 50 yards from us. We are hopelessly outnumbered. I will not withdraw one inch but fight to the last man last round."

Spurred by his gallantry, Sepoy Dewan Singh Danu attacked the enemy fearlessly before losing his life. Dewan Singh was awarded the Maha Vir Chakra posthumously for inflicting at least 22 casualties. At the end of the battle, Indian casualties were 15-22 killed including Major Somnath Sharma and 26 wounded. The resistance of 4 Kumaon had halted the lashkar tribal advance after taking heavy losses.The lashkar tribal forces suffered heavy casualties. 200+ tribal forces killed along with their 2 officers, 2 JCOs and 320+ tribesman wounded.

Brigadier Sen then ordered a reorganization of the defenses. 1 Punjab was ordered to vacate Magam immediately and fall back to Srinagar.

At Evening, troops of 1 Punjab were moved to Badgam. They occupied blocking positions to secure the airfield. Now at night they waited. The airfield was still vulnerable. Yet, the lashkar tribal forces failed to make a good opportunity to capture the airfield. The reason being Khurshid, the leader of the lashkar, was injured which dithered on further course of action. Afterwards, 1 Punjab recaptured Badgam and secured the airfield and the remaining lashkar tribal forces had to abandon their advance as heavy casualties occurred on their side.

== Aftermath of battle ==
Despite heavy losses the company of 4 Kumaon under Major Somnath Sharma repelled the enemy advance. For his courageous "last man, last round" stand, Major Sharma was posthumously awarded the Param Vir Chakra, Independent India's newly instituted highest award for gallantry.

The fierce resistance of Sharma's company had caused 200 casualties to the raiders. Also, the tribal leader of the lashkar had a bullet through his leg. The Pakistani raiders made no attempt to exploit the vulnerabilities that night and move to the airfield or to Srinagar city. It is surmised that the incapacitation of the leader, the heavy losses, and reports of movement of 1 Punjab into the area had caused the lashkar raiders to misjudge the tactical situation. Later 1 Punjab recaptured Badgam securing airfield and caused the raiders to abandon their advance. This also bought time for additional Indian troops to fly into the Srinagar airport the next day, reorganize and block all routes of ingress to Srinagar.
