= Muslim National Guard =

Paramilitary organization in the Indian subcontinent

Muslim League National Guard
- مسلم لیگ نیشنل گارڈ
- The Crescent and Star flag of Muslim League used by Muslim League National Guard
- Other name: "Army of the Angels of Death" (Bengali: আজরাইল বাহিনী Azrail Bahini)
- Founder: Raja of Mahmudabad
- Leaders: Siddique Ali Khan; Shaukat Hayat Khan; Khurshid Anwar; Khwaja Nazimuddin
- Founded: 1937
- Dates active: 1937 - 1947
- Dissolved: 1949
- Merged into: Pakistan Armed Forces; East Bengal Regiment
- Allegiance: All-India Muslim League
- Active regions: British India
- Ideology: Muslim Nationalism; Pakistani Separatism; Islamic nationalism Pakistani nationalism
- Political position: Far-Right
- Size: ~10,000 (neutral sources); ~ 100,000 (Self-claim)
- Wars: First Kashmir war

Muslim League National Guards, or Muslim National Guards, was the name of a quasi-paramilitary organization associated All-India Muslim League that took part in the Pakistan Movement. The organization was active in the Hindu-Muslim violence that led up to the partition of India and the conflict that followed it up. It was also a participant in the Kashmir conflict.

== History ==
=== Foundation ===
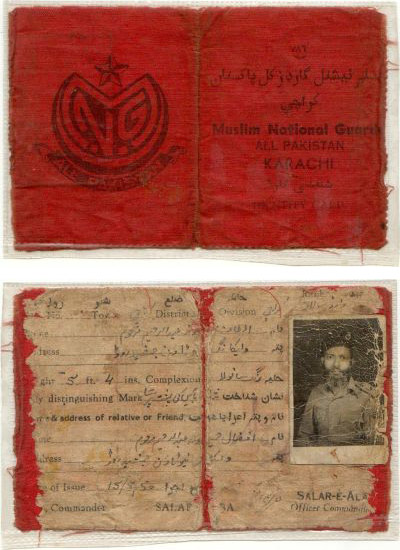
A Muslim National Guard Identity Card issued in Karachi in 1950.

The organisation of Muslim National Guards was founded in the United Provinces in c. 1937. It followed the formation of other Muslim-focused volunteer corps organisations such as Ahrars (1929) and Khaksars (1931). According to scholar Ian Talbot, Muslim League began to make use of public spaces for agitation for its Pakistan movement, which had the danger of rousing public passions and inviting repression from the British government. The Muslim National Guards were created to reconcile public participation with public order.

The Raja of Mahmudabad convened a committee in early 1937 and drafted the ground rules for the organisation. It incorporated discipline, truthfulness and social service with the objective of achieving a cohesive Muslim community. Membership was limited to Muslims, with a minimum age of 15 years. In 1940, the Muslim League drew up a new constitution, setting its aims and objectives to be the same as those of Muslim League. Another revision of the constitution was made in 1944, focusing the organisation's role in social and physical development of Muslims. A renewed emphasis was placed on volunteers wearing a uniform, attending the mosque and flag salutation ceremonies.

=== Strength ===
By the end of 1946, the Muslim League National Guards had 22,000 members in Punjab. But it lagged behind its Hindu counterpart, the Rashtriya Swayamsevak Sangh, which had twice as many. In Punjab, it had to also reckon with the Sikh force, Akal Fauj. In February 1947, the British Indian government estimated the all-India strength to be 118,152, which is regarded as an underestimate by scholar Ian Talbot. Its commander Siddique Ali Khan claimed a strength of 300,000 in the Bengal province alone, which is taken to be an overestimate.

== Presence throughout the Regions ==
=== Bengal and Bihar ===
In Bengal, Huseyn Shaheed Suhrawardy, at the inauguration of a training center in Faridpur, stated that those who were getting training at the center would act as the soldiers for the achievement of Pakistan and would save the Muslims from enemy attacks. In 1946, Abdul Monem Khan organized the Muslim National Guards in Mymensingh with 100,000 volunteers and became the Salar-i-Zilla or the commander-in-chief of the district.

The members of the National Guards wore distinctive green uniforms with green hats and carried green flags.

== Role in Partition violence ==
On 24 January 1947, the Coalition Government in Punjab declared both the Muslim National Guards and the Rashtriya Swayamsevak Sangh illegal organizations. The ban was lifted on 28 January 1947. Ghazarfar Ali opposed the Government decision contending that a ban on the Muslim National Guards was a ban on the most important activities of the Muslim League. On 14 August 1946, two days before the Direct Action Day started in Kolkata, the members of the Muslim National Guards were called upon to assemble at the Muslim Institute at 8:30 a.m. During the violence in the Punjab, the Muslim National Guards worked closely with the Khaksars and the Ahrars.

== Ban ==
In 1948, the organization was banned in India after the Indian government launched a crackdown against organizations dedicated to promoting communal hatred or preaching violence in the aftermath of the assassination of Mahatma Gandhi.

== See also ==
- National Guard (Pakistan), a military reserve created in 1948

== Bibliography ==
- Ahmed, Ishtiaq (2012), The Punjab Bloodied, Partitioned and Cleansed: Unravelling the 1947 Tragedy through Secret British Reports and First-Person Accounts, OUP Pakistan, ISBN 978-0-19-906470-0
- Hansen, Anders Bjørn (2003), "The Punjab 1937-47 – A Case of Genocide?", in Steven L. B. Jensen (ed.), Genocide: Cases, Comparisons and Contemporary Debates (PDF), Danish Center for Holocaust and Genocide Studies, pp. 83–122, ISBN 978-87-989305-0-1, archived from the original (PDF) on 27 March 2014
- Talbot, Ian (1996), Freedom's Cry: The Popular Dimension in the Pakistan Movement and Partition Experience in North-West India, Oxford University Press, ISBN 019-577657-7 – via archive.org
