= India–Pakistan war of 1947–1948 =

1947–1948 war between India and Pakistan

- Part of the India–Pakistan wars, Kashmir conflict and aftermath of the partition of India
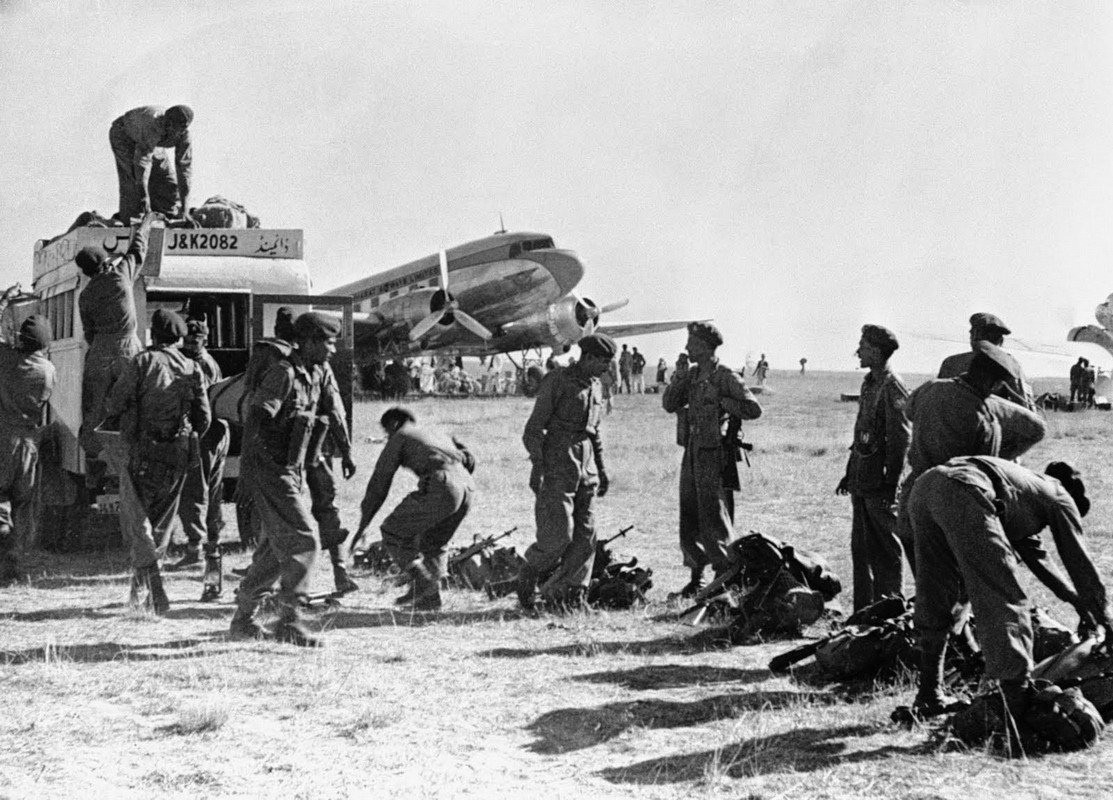
- Indian troops landing on Srinagar airfield
Date	22 October 1947 – 1 January 1949 (1 year and 10 weeks)
Location	Jammu and Kashmir
Result	See Aftermath section
Territorial changes	One-third of Jammu and Kashmir controlled by Pakistan. Indian control over remainder.

Belligerents
India; Jammu and Kashmir (Note: Jammu and Kashmir defended against an invasion by Pakistan-backed tribal militias of its territories as a sovereign princely state from 22 October 1947 to 26 October 1947, when it signed an instrument of accession to India in exchange for military support. After this point, Jammu and Kashmir fought as an autonomous princely state within the Union of India until the end of the war.)	Pakistan

Commanders and leaders
Louis Mountbatten; (India) Jawaharlal Nehru; (British Raj) Roy Bucher; K. M. Cariappa; (India) Subayya Thimayya; (India) Kalwant Singh; Hari Singh; Mehr Chand Mahajan; Sheikh Abdullah	Muhammad Ali Jinnah; Liaquat Ali Khan; Frank Messervy; Douglas Gracey; Akbar Khan; (Pakistan) Russell K. Haight Jr.; Khurshid Anwar; (Pakistan) Zaman Kiani; (Pakistan) William Brown

Units involved
Indian Armed Forces; Indian Army; Indian Air Force; Jammu and Kashmir State Forces	Pakistan Armed Forces; Pakistan Army; Pakistan Air Force (supply support only); Pakistani paramilitaries; Gilgit Scouts; Kurram Militia; Frontier Scouts; Khasadar; Muslim League National Guard; (Azad Kashmir) Kashmir Liberation Forces; Indian National Army veterans; Furqan Force; Swat Army; Hunza state forces; Nagar state forces; Chitral state forces

Casualties and losses
1,103–1,500 Indian Army personnel killed; 1,000 Indian soldiers missing; 1,990 J&K state forces killed or missing; 32 RIAF personnel killed; 3,154–3,500 Indian troops wounded; Total military casualties: ~7,000–8,000	1,000 Pakistani troops killed; 5,000 tribesmen and Kashmiri rebels killed; ~14,000 wounded; Total military casualties: ~20,000
- Conflict began when Pashtun tribesmen and Tanoli from Pakistan invaded the princely state of Jammu and Kashmir, prompting the armies of India and Pakistan to get involved shortly afterwards.

The India–Pakistan war of 1947–1948, also known as the first Kashmir war, was a war fought between India and Pakistan over the princely state of Jammu and Kashmir from 1947 to 1948. It was the first of the India–Pakistan wars between the two newly independent nations; both were dominions within the British Commonwealth of Nations. Pakistan precipitated the war a few weeks after its independence by launching tribal lashkar (militias) from Waziristan, in an effort to capture Kashmir and to preempt the possibility of its ruler joining India.

Hari Singh, the Maharaja of Jammu and Kashmir, was facing an uprising by his Muslim subjects in Poonch, and lost control in portions of the western districts. On 22 October 1947, Pakistan's Frontier tribal militias crossed the border of the state. These local tribal militias and irregular Pakistani forces moved to take the capital city of Srinagar, but upon reaching Baramulla, they took to plunder and stalled. Maharaja Hari Singh made a plea to India for assistance, and help was offered, but it was subject to his signing of an Instrument of Accession to India.

The war was initially fought by the Jammu and Kashmir State Forces and by militias from the frontier tribal areas adjoining the North-West Frontier Province. Following the accession of the state to India on 26 October 1947, Indian troops were airlifted to Srinagar, the state capital. British commanding officers initially refused the entry of Pakistani troops into the conflict, citing the accession of the state to India. However, later in 1948, they relented and Pakistan's armies entered the war shortly afterwards. The fronts solidified gradually along what later came to be known as the Line of Control. A formal ceasefire was declared effective 1 January 1949. Numerous analysts state that the war ended in a stalemate, with neither side obtaining a clear victory. Others, however, state that India emerged victorious as it successfully gained the majority of the contested territory.

== Background ==
Prior to 1815, the area now known as Jammu and Kashmir comprised 22 small independent states (16 Hindu and six Muslim) carved out of territories controlled by the Amir (King) of Afghanistan, combined with those of local small rulers. These were collectively referred to as the "Punjab Hill States". These small states, ruled by Rajput kings, were variously independent vassals of the Mughal Empire since the time of Emperor Akbar or sometimes controlled from Kangra state in the Himachal area. Following the decline of the Mughals, turbulence in Kangra and invasions of Gorkhas, the hill states fell successively under the control of the Sikhs under Ranjit Singh.

The First Anglo-Sikh war (1845–46) was fought between the Sikh Empire, which asserted sovereignty over Kashmir, and the East India Company. In the Treaty of Lahore of 1846, the Sikhs were made to surrender the valuable region (the Jullundur Doab) between the Beas and the Sutlej Rivers and required to pay an indemnity of 1.2 million rupees. Because they could not readily raise this sum, the East India Company allowed the Dogra ruler Gulab Singh to acquire Kashmir from the Sikh kingdom in exchange for making a payment of 750,000 rupees to the company. Gulab Singh became the first maharaja of the newly formed princely state of Jammu and Kashmir, founding a dynasty that was to rule the state, the third-largest principality during the British Raj, until India gained its independence in 1947.

From February 1944 to January 1947, Afghanistan faced a series of tribal revolts. These revolts influenced Afghanistan to take a pro-Pakistan stance during the India–Pakistan war of 1947–1948. A pro-India stance in this case would have necessitated stopping Pashtuns from joining Pakistan's war against India, which was expected to cause a resurgence in rebel activity when the government was hoping to focus on national reform.

== Partition of India ==
Partition of India and the movement of refugees

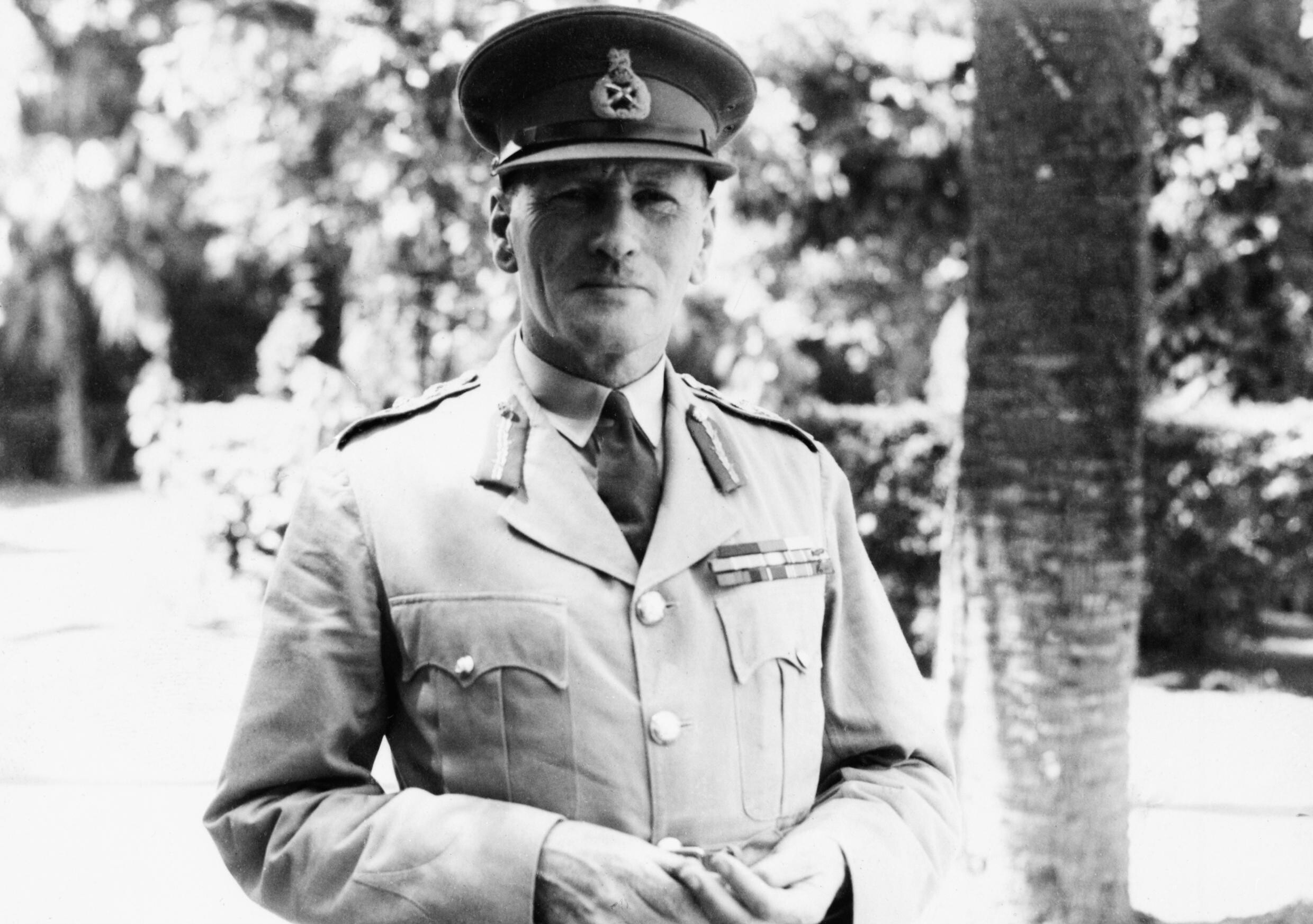
Field Marshal Claude Auchinleck, Supreme Commander of Indian and Pakistani armed forces

The years 1946–1947 saw the rise of All-India Muslim League and Muslim nationalism, demanding a separate state for India's Muslims. The demand took a violent turn on the Direct Action Day (16 August 1946) and inter-communal violence between Hindus and Muslims became endemic. Consequently, the decision was made on 3 June 1947 to divide British India into two separate states, the Dominion of Pakistan comprising the Muslim majority areas and the Dominion of India comprising the rest. The provinces of Punjab and Bengal, with large Muslim-majority areas, were to be divided between the two dominions. An estimated 11 million people eventually migrated between the two parts of Punjab, and possibly one million perished in the inter-communal violence. Jammu and Kashmir, being adjacent to the Punjab and North-West Frontier provinces, was directly affected by the happenings in these province.

The original target date for the transfer of power to the new dominions was June 1948. However, fearing the rise of inter-communal violence, the British Viceroy, Lord Mountbatten, advanced the date to 15 August 1947. This gave only six weeks to complete all the arrangements for partition. Mountbatten's original plan was to stay on as the joint governor general for both of the new dominions until June 1948. However, this was not accepted by the Pakistani leader Muhammad Ali Jinnah. Mountbatten stayed on as the Governor General of India, whereas Pakistan chose Jinnah as its Governor General. Both the newly formed nations were dominions of the British Commonwealth, with George VI as their head of state. It was envisaged that the nationalisation of the armed forces could not be completed by 15 August, (Note: At the beginning of 1947, all the posts above the rank of lieutenant colonel in the army were held by British officers. Pakistan had only four lieutenant colonels, two of whom were involved in the Kashmir conflict: Akbar Khan and Sher Khan. At the beginning of the war, India had about 500 British officers and Pakistan over 1000.) hence British officers stayed on after the transfer of power. The service chiefs were appointed by the dominion governments and were responsible to them. Overall administrative control, but not operational control, was vested with Field Marshal Claude Auchinleck, (Note: Auchinleck was an Indian Army officer since 1903 who had been Commander-in-Chief, India from 1943) who was titled the 'Supreme Commander', answerable to a newly formed Joint Defence Council of the two dominions. India appointed General Rob Lockhart as its Army chief and Pakistan appointed General Frank Messervy.

The presence of the British commanding officers on both sides made the India–Pakistan war of 1947 a strange war. The two commanding officers were in daily telephone contact and adopted mutually defensive positions. The attitude was that "you can hit them so hard but not too hard, otherwise there will be all kinds of repercussions." Both Lockhart and Messervy were replaced in the course of war, and their successors Roy Bucher and Douglas Gracey tried to exercise restraint on their respective governments. Bucher was apparently successful in doing so in India, but Gracey yielded and let British officers be used in operational roles on the side of Pakistan. One British officer died in action.

== Developments in Jammu and Kashmir (August–October 1947) ==
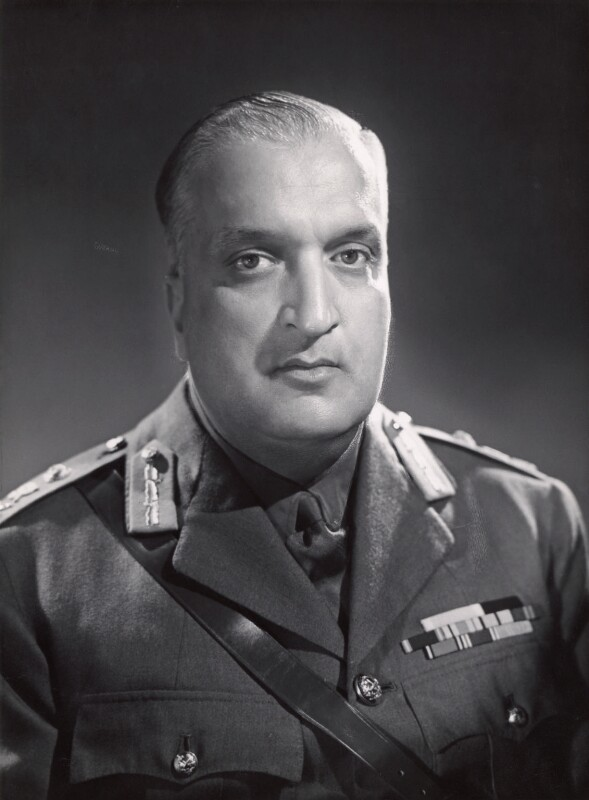
Maharaja Hari Singh of Jammu and Kashmir in military uniform

With the independence of the Dominions, the British Paramountcy over the princely states came to an end. The rulers of the states were advised to join one of the two dominions by executing an Instrument of Accession. Maharaja Hari Singh of Jammu and Kashmir, along with his prime minister Ram Chandra Kak, decided not to accede to either dominion. The reasons cited were that the Muslim majority population of the state would not be comfortable with joining India, and that the Hindu and Sikh minorities would become vulnerable if the state joined Pakistan.

In 1947, the princely state of Jammu and Kashmir had a wide range of ethnic and religious communities. The Kashmir province consisting of the Kashmir Valley and the Muzaffarabad district had a majority Muslim population (over 90%). The Jammu province, consisting of five districts, had roughly equal numbers of Hindus and Muslims in the eastern districts (Udhampur, Jammu and Reasi), and a Muslim majority in the western districts (Mirpur and Poonch). The mountainous Ladakh district (wazarat) in the east had a significant Buddhist presence with a Muslim majority in Baltistan. The Gilgit Agency in the north was overwhelmingly Muslim and was directly governed by the British under an agreement with the Maharaja. Shortly before the transfer of power, the British returned the Gilgit Agency to the Maharaja, who appointed a Dogra governor for the district and a British commander for the local forces.

The predominant political movement in the Kashmir Valley, the National Conference led by Sheikh Abdullah, believed in secular politics. It was allied with the Indian National Congress and was believed to favour joining India. On the other hand, the Muslims of the Jammu province supported the Muslim Conference, which was allied to the All-India Muslim League and favoured joining Pakistan. The Hindus of the Jammu province favoured an outright merger with India. In the midst of all the diverging views, the Maharaja's decision to remain independent was apparently a judicious one.

=== Operation Gulmarg plan ===
Operation Gulmarg locations

According to Indian military sources, the Pakistani Army prepared a plan called Operation Gulmarg and put it into action as early as 20 August, a few days after Pakistan's independence. The plan was accidentally revealed to an Indian officer, |Major O. S. Kalkat, serving with the Bannu Brigade. (Note: Major Kalkat was the brigade major of the Bannu Brigade, who opened a demi-official letter marked "Personal/Top Secret" on 20 August 1947 signed by General Frank Messervy, the then Commander in Chief of the Pakistan Army. It was addressed to Kalkat's commanding officer, Brig. C. P. Murray, who happened to be away at another post. The Pakistani officials suspected Kalkat and placed him under house arrest. He escaped and made his way to New Delhi on 18 October. However, the Indian military authorities and defence minister did not believe his information. He was recalled and debriefed on 24 October after the tribal invasion of Kashmir had started.) According to the plan, 20 lashkars (tribal militias), each consisting of 1,000 Pashtun tribesmen, were to be recruited from among various Pashtun tribes and armed at the brigade headquarters at Bannu, Wanna, Peshawar, Kohat, Thall and Nowshera by the first week of September. They were expected to reach the launching point of Abbottabad on 18 October and cross into Jammu and Kashmir on 22 October. Ten lashkars were expected to attack the Kashmir Valley through Muzaffarabad and another ten lashkars were expected to join the rebels in Poonch, Bhimber and Rawalakot, with a view to advancing into Jammu. Detailed arrangements for the military leadership and armaments were described in the plan.

The regimental records show that, by the last week of August, the 11th Prince Albert Victor's Own Cavalry (Frontier Force) (PAVO Cavalry) regiment was briefed about the invasion plan. Colonel Sher Khan, the Director of Military Intelligence, was in charge of the briefing, along with Colonels Akbar Khan and Khanzadah. The cavalry regiment was tasked with procuring arms and ammunition for the 'freedom fighters' and establishing three wings of the insurgent forces: the South Wing commanded by Major General Zaman Kiani, a Central Wing based at Rawalpindi, and a North Wing based at Abbottabad. By 1 October, the cavalry regiment completed the task of arming the insurgent forces. "Throughout the war there was no shortage of small arms, ammunitions, or explosives at any time." The regiment was also told to be on stand by for fighting at the appropriate time.

Scholars have noted considerable movement of Pashtun tribes during September–October. By 13 September, armed Pashtuns drifted into Lahore and Rawalpindi. The Deputy Commissioner of Dera Ismail Khan noted a scheme to send tribesmen from Malakand to Sialkot in lorries provided by the Pakistan government. Preparations for attacking Kashmir were also noted in the princely states of Swat, Dir, and Chitral. Scholar Robin James Moore states there is "little doubt" that Pashtuns were involved in border raids all along the Punjab border from the Indus to the Ravi.

Pakistani sources deny the existence of any plan called Operation Gulmarg. However, Shuja Nawaz does list 22 Pashtun tribes involved in the invasion of Kashmir on 22 October.

=== Rebellion in Poonch ===
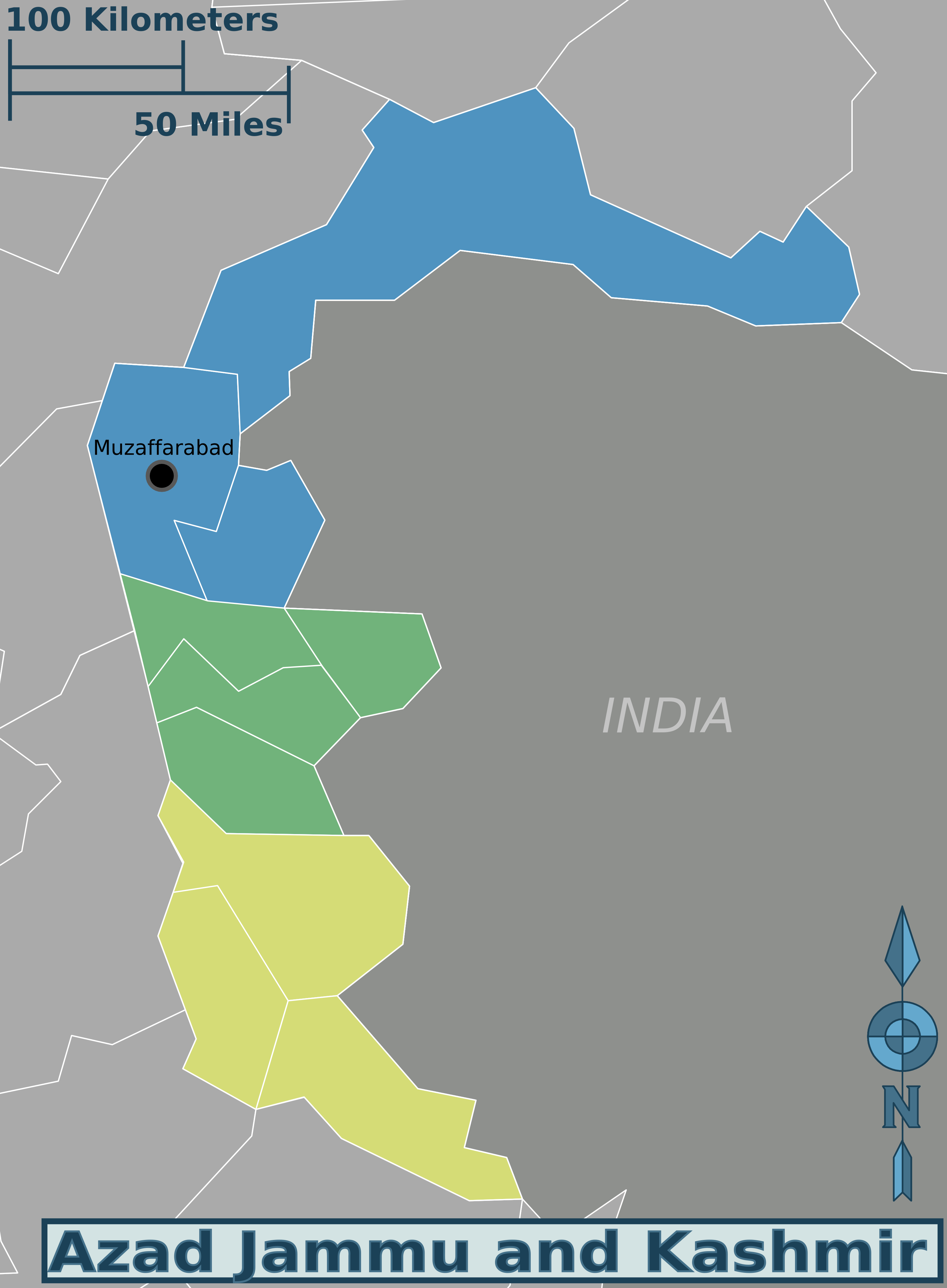
Poonch district of Pakistan-administered Azad Kashmir (in green) along with Muzaffarabad (blue) and Mirpur (yellow) districts in 1947

Sometime in August 1947, the first signs of trouble broke out in Poonch, about which diverging views have been received. Poonch was originally an internal jagir (autonomous principality), governed by an alternative family line of Maharaja Hari Singh. The taxation is said to have been heavy. The Muslims of Poonch had long campaigned for the principality to be absorbed into the Punjab province of British India. In 1938, a notable disturbance occurred for religious reasons, but a settlement was reached. During the Second World War, over 60,000 men from Poonch and Mirpur districts enrolled in the British Indian Army. After the war, they were discharged with arms, which is said to have alarmed the Maharaja. In June, Poonchis launched a 'No Tax' campaign. In July, the Maharaja ordered that all the soldiers in the region be disarmed. (Note: Under the Jammu and Kashmir Arms Act of 1940, the possession of all fire arms was prohibited in the state. The Dogra Rajputs were however exempted in practice.) The absence of employment prospects coupled with high taxation drove the Poonchis to rebellion. The "gathering head of steam", states scholar Srinath Raghavan, was utilised by the local Muslim Conference led by Sardar Muhammad Ibrahim Khan (Sardar Ibrahim) to further their campaign for accession to Pakistan.

According to state government sources, the rebellious militias gathered in the Naoshera-Islamabad area, attacking the state troops and their supply trucks. A battalion of state troops was dispatched, which cleared the roads and dispersed the militias. By September, order was reestablished. The Muslim Conference sources, on the other hand, narrate that hundreds of people were killed in Bagh during flag hoisting around 15 August and that the Maharaja unleashed a 'reign of terror' on 24 August. Local Muslims also told Richard Symonds, a British Quaker social worker, that the army fired on crowds, and burnt houses and villages indiscriminately. According to the Assistant British High Commissioner in Pakistan, H. S. Stephenson, "the Poonch affair... was greatly exaggerated".

=== Pakistan's preparations, Maharaja's manoeuvring ===
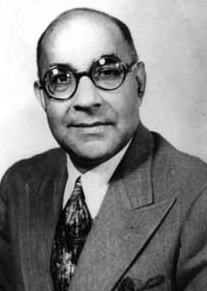
Liaquat Ali Khan, prime minister of Pakistan

Scholar Prem Shankar Jha states that the Maharaja had decided, as early as April 1947, that he would accede to India if it was not possible to stay independent. The rebellion in Poonch possibly unnerved the Maharaja. Accordingly, on 11 August, he dismissed his pro-Pakistan Prime Minister, Ram Chandra Kak, and appointed retired Major Janak Singh in his place. On 25 August, he sent an invitation to Justice Mehr Chand Mahajan of the Punjab High Court to come as the prime minister. On the same day, the Muslim Conference wrote to the Pakistani Prime Minister Liaquat Ali Khan warning him that "if, God forbid, the Pakistan Government or the Muslim League do not act, Kashmir might be lost to them". This set the ball rolling in Pakistan.

Liaquat Ali Khan sent a Punjab politician Mian Iftikharuddin to explore the possibility of organising a revolt in Kashmir. Meanwhile, Pakistan cut off essential supplies to the state, such as petrol, sugar and salt. It also stopped trade in timber and other products, and suspended train services to Jammu. Iftikharuddin returned in mid-September to report that the National Conference held strong in the Kashmir Valley and ruled out the possibility of a revolt.

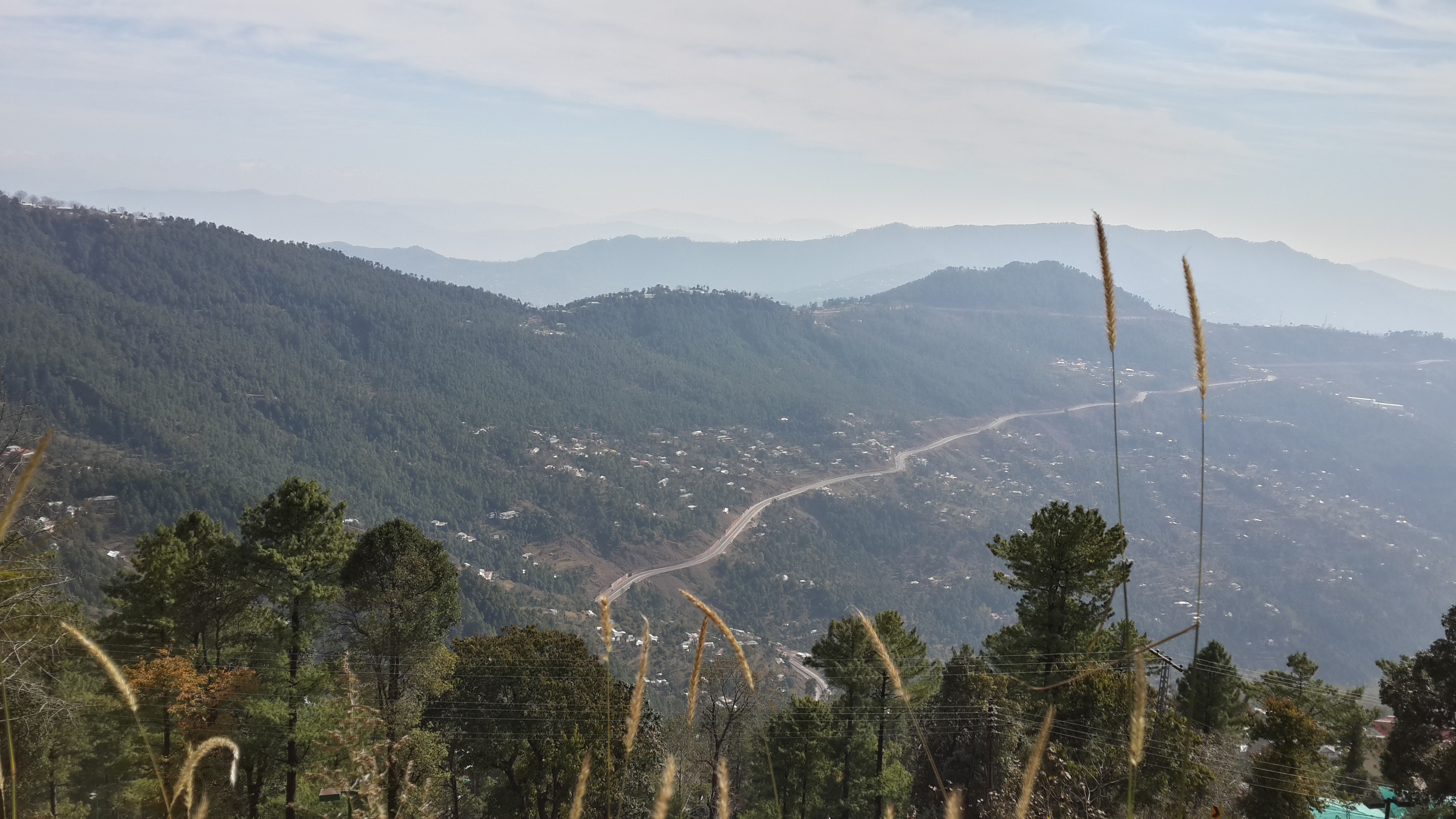
Murree, overlooking Kashmir

Meanwhile, Sardar Ibrahim had escaped to West Punjab, along with dozens of rebels, and established a base in Murree. From there, the rebels attempted to acquire arms and ammunition for the rebellion and smuggle them into Kashmir. Colonel Akbar Khan, one of a handful of high-ranking officers in the Pakistani Army, (Note: According to scholar Christine Fair, at the time of independence, Pakistan had one major general, two brigadiers, and six colonels, even though the requirements were for 13 major generals, 40 brigadiers, and 52 colonels.) with a keen interest in Kashmir, arrived in Murree, and got enmeshed in these efforts. He arranged 4,000 rifles for the rebellion by diverting them from the Army stores. He also wrote out a draft plan titled Armed Revolt inside Kashmir and gave it to Mian Iftikharuddin to be passed on to Pakistan's prime minister.

On 12 September, the prime minister held a meeting with Mian Iftikharuddin, Colonel Akbar Khan and another Punjab politician Sardar Shaukat Hayat Khan. Hayat Khan had a separate plan, involving the Muslim League National Guard and the militant Pashtun tribes from the Frontier regions. The prime minister approved both the plans, and despatched Khurshid Anwar, the head of the Muslim League National Guard, to mobilise the Frontier tribes.

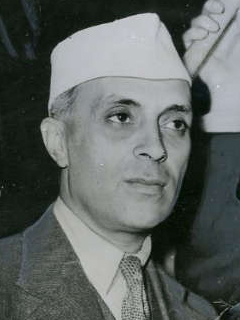
Jawaharlal Nehru, prime minister of India

The Maharaja was increasingly driven to the wall with the rebellion in the western districts and the Pakistani blockade. He managed to persuade Justice Mahajan to accept the post of prime minister (but not to arrive for another month, for procedural reasons). He sent word to the Indian leaders through Mahajan that he was willing to accede to India but needed more time to implement political reforms. However, it was India's position that it would not accept accession from the Maharaja unless it had the people's support. Indian Prime Minister Jawaharlal Nehru demanded that Sheikh Abdullah should be released from prison and involved in the state's government. Accession could only be contemplated afterwards. Following further negotiations, Sheikh Abdullah was released on 29 September.

Nehru, foreseeing a number of disputes over princely states, formulated a policy that states

"wherever there is a dispute in regard to any territory, the matter should be decided by a referendum or plebiscite of the people concerned. We shall accept the result of this referendum whatever it may be."

The policy was communicated to Liaquat Ali Khan on 1 October at a meeting of the Joint Defence Council. Khan's eyes are said to have "sparkled" at the proposal. However, he made no response.

=== Operations in Poonch and Mirpur ===
Armed rebellion started in the Poonch district at the beginning of October 1947. The fighting elements consisted of "bands of deserters from the State Army, serving soldiers of the Pakistan Army on leave, ex-servicemen, and other volunteers who had risen spontaneously." The first clash is said to have occurred at Thorar (near Rawalakot) on 3–4 October 1947. The rebels quickly gained control of almost the entire Poonch district. The State Forces garrison at the Poonch city came under heavy siege.

In the Kotli tehsil of the Mirpur district, border posts at Saligram and Owen Pattan on the Jhelum river were captured by rebels around 8 October. Sehnsa and Throchi were lost after some fighting. State Force records reveal that Muslim officers sent with reinforcements sided with the rebels and murdered the fellow state troops.

Radio communications between the fighting units were operated by the Pakistan Army. Even though the Indian Navy intercepted the communications, lacking intelligence in Jammu and Kashmir, it was unable to determine immediately where the fighting was taking place.

== Accession of Kashmir ==
Following the rebellions in the Poonch and Mirpur area and the Pakistan-backed Pashtun tribal invasion from the North-West Frontier Province, the Maharaja asked for Indian military assistance. India set the condition that Kashmir must accede to India for it to receive assistance. The Maharaja complied, and the Government of India recognised the accession of the princely state to India. Indian troops were sent to the state to defend it. (Note: Accession from Kashmir was requested mainly at the insistence of the Governor General Lord Mountbatten, who was congnizant of the apprehensions of the British military officers on both the sides over the possibility of an inter-dominion war. In fact, there was a Stand Down Order already issued by the Supreme Commander Claude Auchinleck that, in the event of an inter-Dominion war, all the British officers on both the sides should immediately stand down. However, Mountbatten's decision has been questioned by Joseph Korbel and biographer Philip Ziegler.) The Jammu & Kashmir National Conference volunteers aided the Indian Army in its campaign to drive out the Pathan invaders.

Pakistan refused to recognise the accession of Kashmir to India, claiming that it was obtained by "fraud and violence." Governor General Mohammad Ali Jinnah ordered his Army Chief General Douglas Gracey to move Pakistani troops to Kashmir at once. However, the Indian and Pakistani forces were still under a joint command, and Field Marshal Auchinleck prevailed upon him to withdraw the order. With its accession to India, Kashmir became legally Indian territory, and the British officers could not a play any role in an inter-Dominion war. The Pakistan Army made available arms, ammunition, and supplies to the rebel forces who were dubbed the "Azad Army". Pakistan Army officers "conveniently" on leave and the former officers of the Indian National Army were recruited to command the forces.

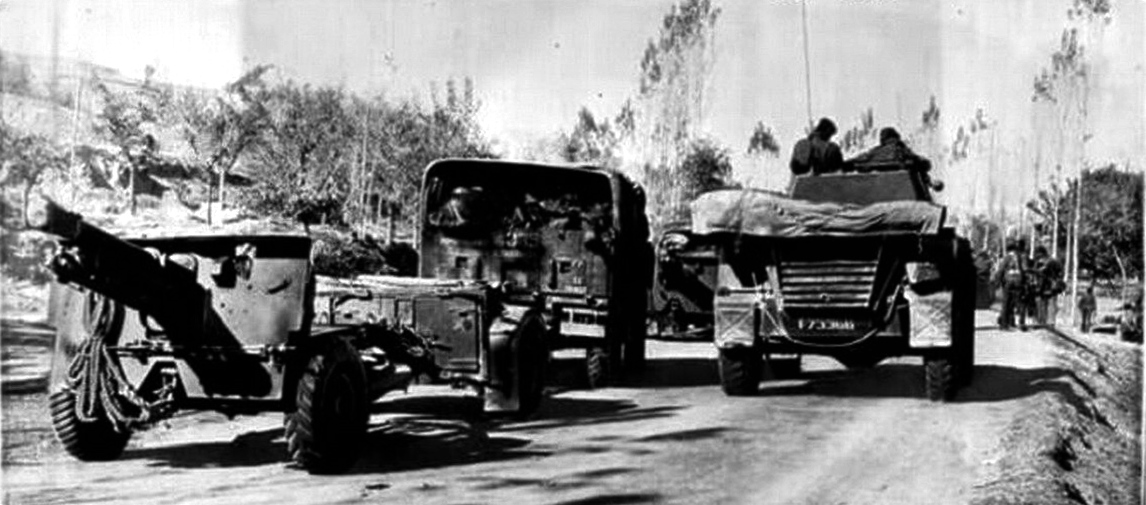
A Pakistan Army convoy advances in Kashmir.

In May 1948, the Pakistan Army officially entered the conflict, in theory to defend the Pakistan borders, but it made plans to push towards Jammu and cut the lines of communications of the Indian forces in the Mehndar Valley. In Gilgit, the force of Gilgit Scouts under the command of a British officer Major William Brown mutinied and overthrew the governor Ghansara Singh. Brown prevailed on the forces to declare accession to Pakistan. They are also believed to have received assistance from the Chitral Scouts and the Bodyguard of the state of Chitral, one of the princely states of Pakistan, which had acceded to Pakistan on 6 October 1947.

=== Operation Datta Khel ===
Operation Datta Khel was a military operation and coup planned by Major William Brown along with the Gilgit Scouts, aimed at overthrowing the rule of the Dogra dynasty of Kashmir. The operation was launched shortly after the news of accession of maharaja to the Dominion of India. By 1 November, Dogra governor at Gilgit had been arrested, and in the succeeding days Colonel Aslam Khan reorganised the Gilgit Scouts and local volunteers to form Ibex Force, which played key role in the campaigns in Baltistan.

== Stages of the war ==
=== Initial invasion ===
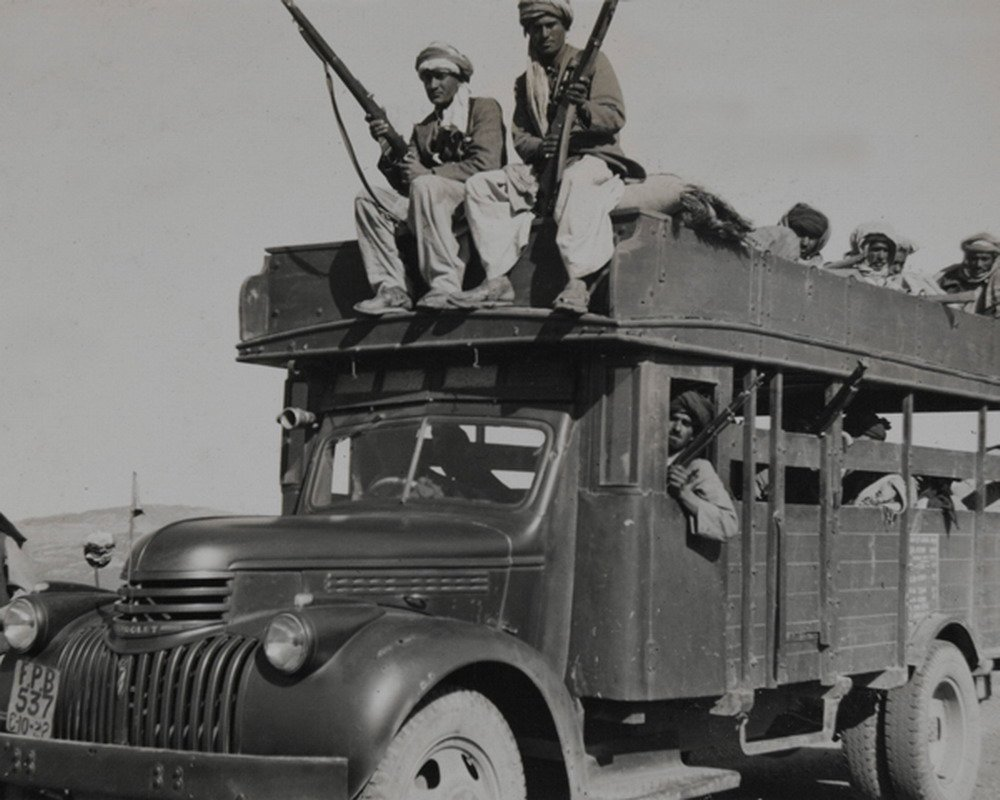
Pashtun warriors from different tribes on their way to Kashmir

On 22 October 1947, Khurshid Anwar entered Kashmir near Muzaffarabad heading a lashkar of 4,000 tribesmen. The Pashtun tribal attack was launched in the Muzaffarabad sector. The state forces stationed in the border regions around Muzaffarabad and Domel were quickly defeated by tribal forces (Muslim state forces mutinied and joined them) and the way to the capital was open. Among the raiders, there were many active Pakistani Army soldiers disguised as tribals. They were also provided logistical help by the Pakistan Army. Rather than advancing toward Srinagar before state forces could regroup or be reinforced, the invading forces remained in the captured cities in the border region engaging in looting and other crimes against their inhabitants. In the Poonch valley, the state forces retreated into towns where they were besieged.

Records indicate that the Pakistani tribals beheaded many Hindu and Sikh civilians in Jammu and Kashmir.

In the Poonch and Kotli districts, the tribesmen and rebels were led by an American ex-GI, Russell K. Haight Jr., who had been promoted to the rank of Brigadier in the Kashmir Liberation Force, who was said to be operating under the pseudonym "General Tariq."

=== Indian operation in the Kashmir Valley ===
After the accession, India airlifted troops and equipment to Srinagar under the command of Lt. Col. Dewan Ranjit Rai, where they reinforced the princely state forces, established a defence perimeter and defeated the tribal forces on the outskirts of the city. After Khurshid Anwar and some of the tribesmen advanced again, about 1,000 of them reached Budgam by 3 November, which was within striking distance of the Srinagar airfield. Here they were confronted by Indian troops.

The Indians managed on holding both the capital and airfield overnight against extreme odds. The successful defence included an outflanking manoeuvre by Indian armoured cars during the Battle of Shalateng. The defeated tribal forces were pursued as far as Baramulla and Uri and these towns, too, were recaptured.

In the Poonch valley, tribal forces continued to besiege state forces

The tribal forces were also joined by troops from Chitral, whose ruler, Muzaffar ul-Mulk the Mehtar of Chitral, had acceded to Pakistan.

By 5 November 1947, Indian Army officer Kalwant Singh was appointed as the commander of the Indian Army forces in Kashmir and was responsible for the operations in the entire state.

=== Attempted link-up at Poonch and fall of Mirpur ===
Indian forces ceased pursuit of tribal forces after recapturing Uri and Baramula, and sent a relief column southwards, in an attempt to relieve Poonch. Although the relief column eventually reached Poonch, the siege could not be lifted. A second relief column reached Kotli, and evacuated the garrisons of that town and others but were forced to abandon it being too weak to defend it. Meanwhile, Mirpur was captured by the tribal forces on 25 November 1947 with the help of Pakistan's PAVO Cavalry. This led to the 1947 Mirpur massacre where Hindu women were reportedly abducted by tribal forces and taken into Pakistan. They were sold in the brothels of Rawalpindi. Around 400 women jumped into wells in Mirpur committing suicide to escape from being abducted.

=== Fall of Jhanger and attacks on Naoshera and Uri ===
The tribal forces attacked and captured Jhanger. They then attacked Naoshera unsuccessfully, and made a series of unsuccessful attacks on Uri. In the south a minor Indian attack secured Chamb. By this stage of the war the front line began to stabilise as more Indian troops became available.

=== Operation Vijay: counterattack to Jhanger ===
The Indian forces launched a counterattack in the south recapturing Jhanger and Rajauri. In the Kashmir Valley the tribal forces continued attacking the Uri garrison. In the north, Skardu was brought under siege by the Gilgit Scouts.

=== Indian spring offensive ===
The Indians held onto Jhanger against numerous counterattacks, who were increasingly supported by regular Pakistani Forces. In the Kashmir Valley the Indians attacked, recapturing Tithwail. The Ibex Force made good progress in the High Himalayas sector, besieging Skardu, capturing Kargil and sending troops to besiege Leh. They also defeated an Indian relief column heading for Skardu at Thorgo.

=== Siege of Skardu ===
The Indian garrison at Skardu was besieged on 10 February 1948 by Ibex Force, which had been raised from among Gilgit Scouts and local volunteers by Colonel Aslam Khan, however the attack was repulsed by Indians. Thereafter, the Indian garrison under Colonel Sher Jung Thapa was subjected to continuous siege for the next six months with their attacks being unsuccessful. Thapa had held the Skardu with hardly 250 men for whole six long months without any reinforcement and replenishment. On 14 August, Thapa surrendered to Chitral Scouts under Colonel Mata ul-Mulk after a six-month long siege.

=== Operations Gulab and Eraze ===
The Indians continued to attack in the Kashmir Valley sector driving north to capture Keran and Gurais (Operation Eraze). They also repelled a counterattack aimed at Teetwal. In the Jammu region, the forces besieged in Poonch broke out and temporarily linked up with the outside world again.

=== Operation Bison ===
During this time the front began to settle down. The siege of Poonch continued. An unsuccessful attack was launched by 77 Parachute Brigade (Brig Atal) to capture Zoji La pass. Operation Duck, the earlier epithet for this assault, was renamed as Operation Bison by Cariappa. M5 Stuart light tanks of 7 Cavalry were moved in dismantled conditions through Srinagar and winched across bridges while two field companies of the Madras Sappers converted the mule track across Zoji La into a jeep track. The surprise attack on 1 November by the brigade with armour supported by two regiments of 25-pounder gun-howitzers and a regiment of 3.7-inch mountain guns, forced the pass and pushed the tribal and Pakistani forces back to Matayan and later Dras. The brigade linked up on 24 November at Kargil with Indian troops advancing from Leh while their opponents eventually withdrew northwards toward Skardu.

=== Operation Easy; Poonch link-up ===
The Indians now started to get the upper hand in all sectors. Poonch was finally relieved after a siege of over a year. The Gilgit forces in the High Himalayas, who had previously made good progress, were finally defeated. The Indians pursued as far as Kargil before being forced to halt due to supply problems. The Zoji La pass was forced by using tanks (which had not been thought possible at that altitude) and Dras was recaptured.

At 23.59 hrs on 1 January 1949, a United Nations-mediated ceasefire came into effect, bring the war to an end.

== Aftermath ==
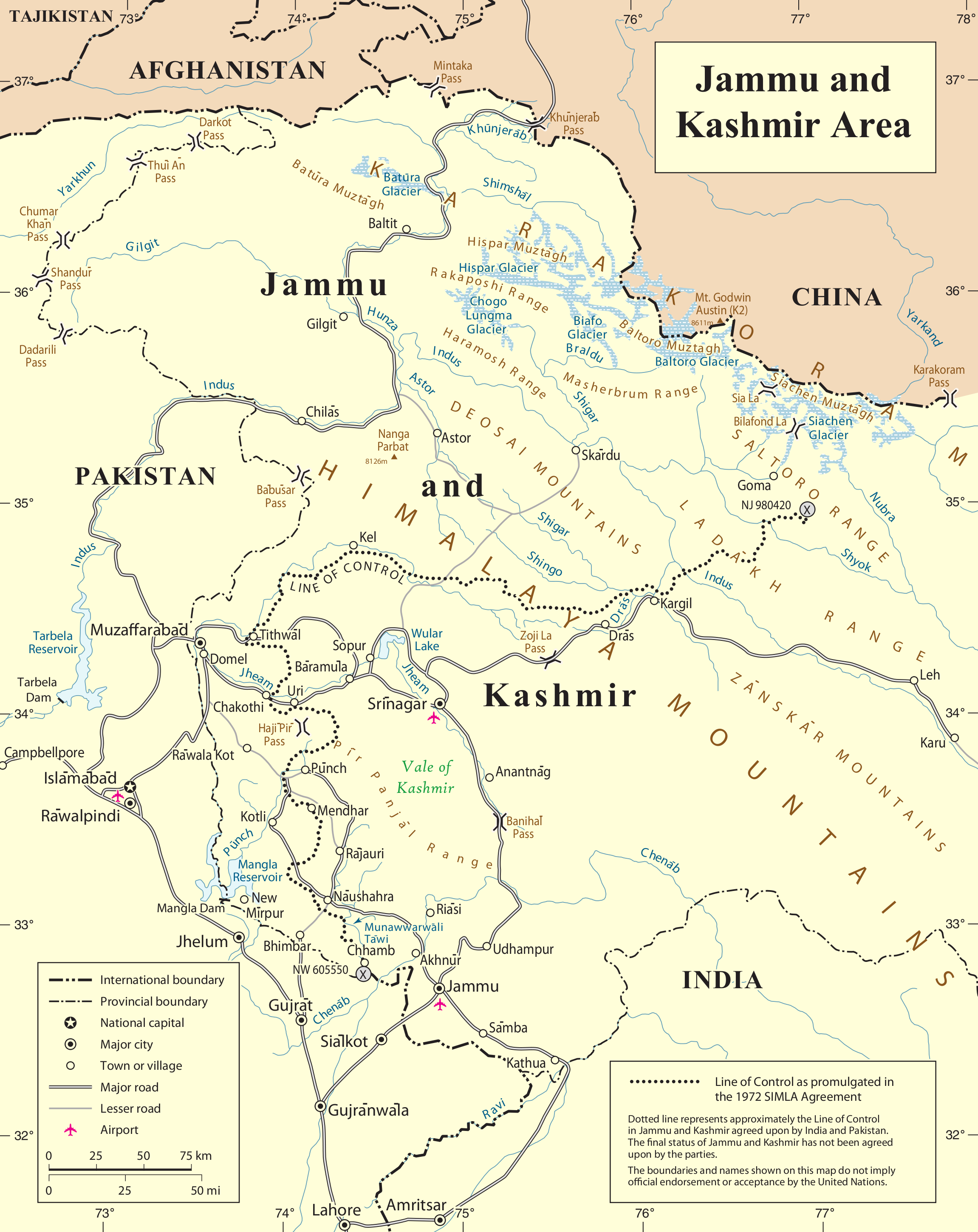
The Line of Control between India and Pakistan agreed in the Simla Agreement (UN map)

The terms of the ceasefire, laid out in a UN Commission resolution on 13 August 1948, were adopted by the commission on 5 January 1949.This required Pakistan to withdraw its forces, both regular and irregular, while allowing India to maintain minimal forces within the state to preserve law and order. Upon compliance with these conditions, a plebiscite was to be held to determine the future of the territory. Owing to disagreements over the demilitarisation steps, a plebiscite was never held and the cease-fire line essentially became permanent. Some sources may refer to 5 January as the beginning of the ceasefire.

Indian losses in the war totalled 1,104 killed and 3,154 wounded; Pakistani, about 6,000 killed and 14,000 wounded.

Numerous analysts state that the war ended in a stalemate, with neither side obtaining a clear victory. Others, however, state that India emerged victorious as it successfully gained the majority of the contested territory.

India gained control of about two-thirds of the Jammu and Kashmir princely state, including the Kashmir Valley, the Jammu province and Ladakh. Pakistan had control of one-third of the state: three western districts later named Azad Jammu and Kashmir, and the northern areas including the Gilgit district, the Gilgit Agency and the Baltistan tehsil of the Ladakh district (later renamed Gilgit-Baltistan).

India and Pakistan signed the Karachi Agreement in July 1949 and established a ceasefire line to be supervised by observers. After the termination of the UNCIP, the Security Council passed Resolution 91 (1951) and established a United Nations Military Observer Group in India and Pakistan (UNMOGIP) to observe and report violations of ceasefire.

The resentment over Pakistani defeat in the war resulted in a failed coup led by General Akbar Khan in 1951 against the government of Prime Minister Liaquat Ali Khan. Army officers thought the government's acceptance of UN mediation and ceasefire was weak and squandered an opportunity to capture the entirety of Kashmir.

After two further wars in 1965 and 1971, only minor changes in the ground situation had been effected. After the last war, the two countries reached the 1972 Simla Agreement, converting the cease-fire line into a Line of Control and disavowing the use of force across it. In 1984, India gained Siachen after launching a short military action.

== Military awards ==
=== Battle honours ===
After the war, a total of number of 11 battle honours and one theatre honour were awarded to units of the Indian Army, the notable amongst which are:

- Jammu and Kashmir 1947–48 (theatre honour)
- Gurais
- Kargil
- Naoshera
- Punch
- Rajouri
- Srinagar
- Teetwal
- Zoji La

=== Gallantry awards ===
For bravery, a number of soldiers and officers were awarded the highest gallantry award of their respective countries. Following is a list of the recipients of the Indian award Param Vir Chakra, and the Pakistani award Nishan-E-Haider:

India

- Major Som Nath Sharma (posthumous)
- Lance Naik Karam Singh
- Second Lieutenant Rama Raghoba Rane
- Naik Jadu Nath Singh (posthumous)
- Company Havildar Major Piru Singh Shekhawat (posthumous)

Pakistan

- Captain Muhammad Sarwar
- Naik Saif Ali Janjua (posthumous)

== See also ==
- Siege of Skardu
- Rann of Kuch War
- Battle of Badgam
- India–Pakistan war of 1965
- Sino-Indian War
- Nathu La and Cho La clashes
- India–Pakistan wars and conflicts
- Kargil War
- Brigadier Mohammad Usman
- Siachen conflict

== Bibliography ==
- Ankit, Rakesh (May 2010). "Henry Scott: The forgotten soldier of Kashmir". Epilogue. 4 (5): 44–49. Archived from the original on 12 October 2017.
- Ankit, Rakesh (August 2010), "The Problem of Poonch", Epilogue, 4 (8): 8–49
- Ankit, Rakesh (November 2010), "October 1947", Epilogue, 4 (11): 9–, archived from the original on 21 February 2018
- Ankit, Rakesh (2016). The Kashmir Conflict: From Empire to the Cold War, 1945–66. Routledge. ISBN 978-1-317-22525-6.
  - Ankit, Rakesh (2014), Kashmir, 1945–66: From Empire to the Cold War (phd), University of Southampton
- Bajwa, Kuldip Singh (2003). Jammu and Kashmir War, 1947–1948: Political and Military Perspective. Har-Anand Publications. ISBN 978-81-241-0923-6.
- Bangash, Yaqoob Khan (2010), "Three Forgotten Accessions: Gilgit, Hunza and Nagar", The Journal of Imperial and Commonwealth History, 38 (1): 117–143, doi:10.1080/03086530903538269, S2CID 159652497
- Barua, Pradeep (2003). Gentlemen of the Raj: The Indian Army Officer Corps, 1817–1949. Greenwood Publishing Group. pp. 133–. ISBN 978-0-275-97999-7.
- Barua, Pradeep (2005). The State at War in South Asia. University of Nebraska Press. ISBN 978-0-8032-1344-9.
- Bhattacharya, Brigadier Samir (2013). NOTHING BUT!: Book Three: What Price Freedom. Partridge Publishing. pp. 42–. ISBN 978-1-4828-1625-9.
- Brahma Singh, K. (1990). History of Jammu and Kashmir Rifles, 1820–1956: The State Force Background. Lancer International. ISBN 978-81-7062-091-4.
  - Brahma Singh, K. (2010) [1990], History of Jammu and Kashmir Rifles, 1820–1956: The State Force Background (PDF), brahmasingh.co.nf, ISBN 978-81-7062-091-4, archived from the original (PDF) on 6 March 2016
- Cheema, Brig Amar (2015). The Crimson Chinar: The Kashmir Conflict: A Politico Military Perspective. Lancer Publishers. pp. 51–. ISBN 978-81-7062-301-4.
- Dasgupta, C. (2014) [2002]. War and Diplomacy in Kashmir, 1947–48. SAGE Publications. ISBN 978-81-321-1795-7.
- Effendi, Col. M. Y. (2007). Punjab Cavalry: Evolution, Role, Organisation and Tactical Doctrine 11 Cavalry, Frontier Force, 1849–1971. Karachi: Oxford University Press. ISBN 978-0-19-547203-5.
- Guha, Ramachandra (2008). India after Gandhi: The History of the World's Largest Democracy. Pan Macmillan. ISBN 978-0-330-39611-0.
- Hajari, Nisid (2015). Midnight's Furies: The Deadly Legacy of India's Partition. Houghton Mifflin Harcourt. pp. 185–. ISBN 978-0-547-66924-3.
- Hiro, Dilip (2015). The Longest August: The Unflinching Rivalry Between India and Pakistan. Nation Books. ISBN 978-1-56858-503-1.
- Jamal, Arif (2009). Shadow War: The Untold Story of Jihad in Kashmir. Melville House. ISBN 978-1-933633-59-6.
- Jha, Prem Shankar (1996), Kashmir, 1947: Rival Versions of History, Oxford University Press, ISBN 978-0-19-563766-3 – via archive.org
  - Jha, Prem Shankar (2003), The Origins of a Dispute: Kashmir 1947, Oxford University Press, ISBN 978-0-19-566486-7
- Joshi, Manoj (2008). Kashmir, 1947–1965: A Story Retold. India Research Press. ISBN 978-81-87943-52-5.
- Hodson, H. V. (1969). The Great Divide: Britain, India, Pakistan. London: Hutchinson. ISBN 978-0-09-097150-3.
- Korbel, Josef (1966) [1954]. Danger in Kashmir (second ed.). Princeton University Press. ISBN 978-1-4008-7523-8.
- Mahajan, Mehr Chand (1963). Looking Back: The Autobiography of Mehr Chand Mahajan, Former Chief Justice of India. Asia Publishing House.
- Massey, Reginald (2005). Azaadi!. Abhinav Publications. ISBN 978-81-7017-469-1.
- Moore, Robin James (1987). Making the new Commonwealth. Clarendon Press. ISBN 978-0-19-820112-0.
- Palit, D. K. (1972). Jammu and Kashmir Arms: History of the J & K Rifles. Palit & Dutt.
- Prasad, Sri Nandan; Pal, Dharm (1987). Operations in Jammu & Kashmir, 1947–48. History Division, Ministry of Defence, Government of India.
- Raghavan, Srinath (2010). War and Peace in Modern India. Palgrave Macmillan. pp. 101–. ISBN 978-1-137-00737-7. Archived from the original on 19 August 2019.
- Nawaz, Shuja (May 2008), "The First Kashmir War Revisited", India Review, 7 (2): 115–154, doi:10.1080/14736480802055455, ISSN 1473-6489, S2CID 155030407
- Nawaz, Shuja (May 2008), "The First Kashmir War Revisited", India Review, 7 (2): 115–154, doi:10.1080/14736480802055455, S2CID 155030407
- Nawaz, Shuja (2008). Crossed Swords: Pakistan, Its Army, and the Wars Within. Oxford University Press. ISBN 978-0-19-547660-6.
- Sarila, Narendra Singh (2007). The Shadow of the Great Game: The Untold Story of India's Partition. Constable. ISBN 978-1-84529-588-2.
- Schofield, Victoria (2003) [2000]. Kashmir in Conflict. London and New York: I. B. Taurus & Co. ISBN 1-86064-898-3.
- Snedden, Christopher (2013) [first published as The Untold Story of the People of Azad Kashmir, 2012]. Kashmir: The Unwritten History. HarperCollins India. ISBN 978-9350298985.
- Whitehead, Andrew (2007), A Mission in Kashmir, Penguin, ISBN 978-0-670-08127-1
- Zaheer, Hasan (1998). The Times and Trial of the Rawalpindi Conspiracy, 1951: The First Coup Attempt in Pakistan. Oxford University Press. ISBN 978-0-19-577892-2.
