= Matayan =

For Hinduism in India, the Matayan is the sole authority to administer the Muthappan temple, found in the Kannur district of Kerala state, south India.

== See also ==
- Sree Muthappan
- Muthappan temple
