= Khasadar =

Former British Indian and Pakistani tribal security forces

Khasadar Forces
- Active: 1892–2019
- Country: British India (1892-1947); Pakistan (1947-2019)
- Type: Paramilitary force
- Role: Law enforcement/Border patrol/local security
- Size: c. 40,000

The Khasadar (Urdu: خاص دار, Hindi: ख़ास-दार) were paramilitary forces operating throughout the North-West Frontier Tribal Areas in British India and later, the Federally Administered Tribal Areas (now a part of Khyber Pakhtunkhwa province in Pakistan). The Khasadar were a locally recruited and maintained tribal security forces, paid for through a stipend provided directly to their tribes by the Pakistani government. Around 40,000 Khasadar served seven former tribal agencies and six frontier regions.

Members of the force were recruited as volunteers or through family connections. Khasadar officers were called subedars. Khasadars receive 17,400 Rs.

== Origin of the Khasadars ==
Khasadars were first raised in Waziristan and other North West Frontier districts of British India prior to World War I. Their prime functions during this period included the provision of picquets and escorts to protect camel convoys and other travelers when regular soldiers of the Indian Army were not available. They wore the normal clothing of the tribal groups from which they were recruited only distinguished by arm bands bearing the letter K.

== Post FATA-KP merger ==
Pakistan's Express Tribune claims that as of 25 June 2018 there were only 17,965 Khasadars in the tribal districts and sub-divisions, and that the current plan is to reduce the force to 15,000, through the immediate retirement of those eligible. It also stated that 2,500 Khasadars could be offered a severance package while about 9,000 will be retrained and merged into the Levies Force. The remaining 3,500 long-serving Khasadars may be allowed to complete their service until retirement.

April 8, 2019, Khyber Pakhtunkhwa's Chief Minister, Mahmood Khan, stated that the 28,000 personnel of the Levies and the Khasadar were merged into the Khyber Pakhtunkhwa Police. Adviser to Chief Minister on Tribal Districts, Ajmal Khan Wazir, stated that Khasadars will receive the same designations, entitlements and postings as members of the regular police force. The Official Notice implied a period of six months for the assimilation process.

== See also ==
- Law enforcement in Pakistan
- Armed forces of Pakistan
- Pakistan Levies
