= Barran baronets =

Baronetcy in the Baronetage of the United Kingdom

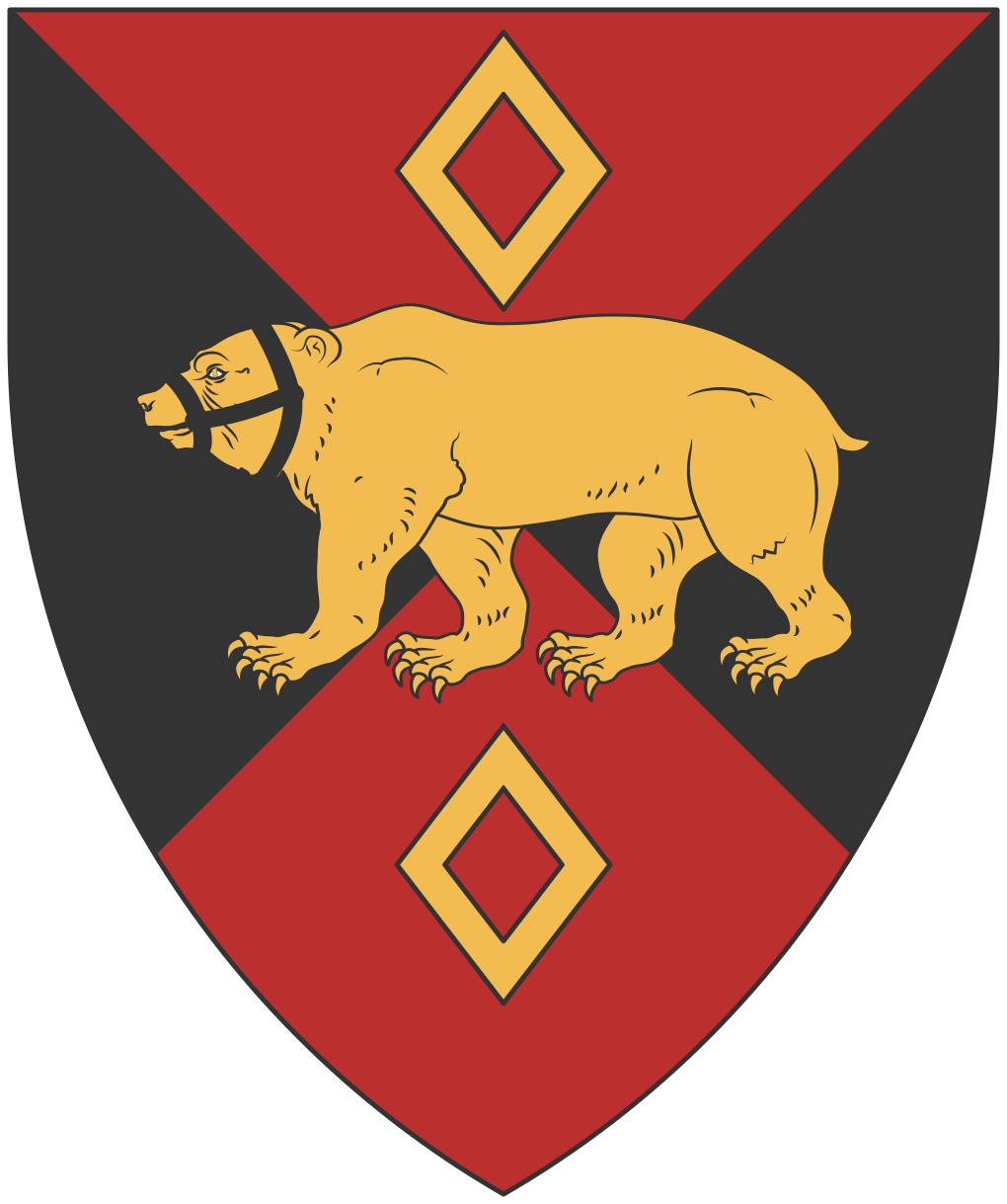
Arms of Barran of Chapel Allerton Hall

The Barran baronetcy, of Chapel Allerton Hall in Chapel Allerton in the West Riding of the County of York and Queen's Gate, St Mary's Abbot, in Kensington in the County of London, is a title in the Baronetage of the United Kingdom. It was created on 11 February 1895 for the clothing manufacturer and politician John Barran. He represented Leeds from 1876 to 1895, and Otley from 1886 to 1895, in the House of Commons.

He was succeeded by his grandson, the 2nd Baronet. He sat as Member of Parliament for Hawick from 1909 to 1918, and served as Parliamentary Private Secretary to Prime Minister H. H. Asquith.

== Barran baronets, of Chapel Allerton Hall and Queen's Gate (1895) ==
- Sir John Barran, 1st Baronet (1821–1905)
- Sir John Nicholson Barran, 2nd Baronet (1872–1952)
- Sir John Leighton Barran, 3rd Baronet (1904–1974)
- Sir John Napoleon Ruthven Barran, 4th Baronet (1934–2010)
- Sir John Ruthven Barran, 5th Baronet (born 1971)

The heir apparent is John Robert Nicholson Barran (born 2008).

== Extended family ==
- Rowland Barran (1858–1949), sixth and youngest son of the 1st Baronet, represented Leeds North in Parliament from 1902 to 1918.
- David Barran (1912–2002), third son of the 2nd Baronet, was managing director and chairman of Shell.
- Christopher Barran (born 2012), is the second and youngest son of Sir John Ruthven Barran.

Baronetage of the United Kingdom
Preceded by Williams baronets	Barran baronets of Chapel Allerton Hall and Queen's Gate; 11 February 1895	Succeeded by Newnes baronets
