= Aslam Khan (brigadier) =

Pakistani military officer (1918-94)

Brigadier Aslam Khan HJ MC
- اسلم خان
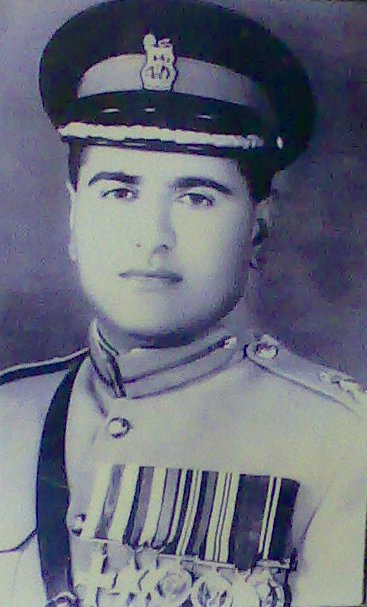

Chief of War Plans CENTO Headquarters (Ankara)
- In office 8 August 1959 – 19 August 1962
- Preceded by: Brigadier Gulzar Ahmed (MBE)

Commander Gilgit Scouts
- In office 14 January 1948 – July 1948
- Preceded by: Major William Brown

Personal details
- Born: 27 August 1918 Jammu, Jammu and Kashmir (princely state)
- Died: 12 October 1994 (aged 76) Skardu, Gilgit Baltistan, Pakistan
- Cause of death: Cirrhosis
- Spouse: Nawabzadi Fareeda Begum (m. 1944; died 1989)
- Children: 5
- Education: Indian Military Academy; Staff College, Quetta; US Army Command and General Staff College
- Nickname: Colonel Pasha

Military service
- Branch/service: Jammu and Kashmir State Forces (1939–1945); British Indian Army (1945–1947); Pakistan Army (1947–1962)
- Years of service: 1939–1962
- Rank: Brigadier
- Commands: 13th Baluch (Jessore Garrison); Gilgit Scouts
- Battles/wars: Waziristan campaign (1936–1939); World War II; Burma Campaign 1944; Indo-Pakistani war of 1947–1948; Siege of Skardu
- Awards: See list

Muhammad Aslam Khan (Note: Urdu: محمد اسلم خان) (27 August 1918 – 12 October 1994) better known as Colonel Pasha, The Legend of Baltistan, and Laji, was a former one-star rank Pakistan Army officer, businessman, and founder of the Shangrila Resort. Notably, as the leader of 'D' Company, he led his troops during World War II in capturing Kennedy Peak (Myanmar), which the Americans had failed to conquer. For this achievement, he was awarded the Military Cross by Field Marshal Auchinleck.

Aslam was assigned a pivotal mission in 1947 by Gilgit's provisional government to defend and expand newly acquired territories. Stripped of his rank in the Pakistan Army with a promise of reinstatement upon success, Aslam joined the Pashtun tribal invasion led by Khurshid Anwar, becoming second-in-command. Following the accession of Jammu and Kashmir to India, Indian troops arrived on 27 October to counter the invasion. The 1st Sikh Regiment, commanded by Lt. Col. Dewan Ranjit Rai, was disrupted by Aslam Khan’s effective use of captured mortars, resulting in Col. Rai’s death. The regiment withdrew, and Indian forces eventually repelled the invaders by 7 November, securing the Kashmir Valley.

In the Gilgit Agency, the Gilgit Scouts, led by Major William Brown, rebelled on 1 November, detaining the governor and aligning with the Bunji garrison, leading to Pakistan's effective control of Gilgit by 16 November. Adopting the alias "Colonel Pasha", he arrived in Gilgit on 30 November with his brother, Major Anwar Khan, and Captain Azmat Ali. His immediate goals were to mobilize local personnel and establish a military base. Despite initial challenges, Pasha secured Major Ehsan Ali’s support and returned to GHQ on 3 December to request additional resources, receiving only four thousand rupees.

Pasha utilized the funds to procure essential supplies and equipped his 2,000-man force with captured weapons and dummy rifles. He formed the Tiger Force and Ibex Force to execute key operations, including ambushes and securing critical positions. His forces, including the Eskimo Force, effectively adapted to harsh conditions and achieved significant tactical successes.

Pasha took over as the Commandant of Gilgit Scouts on 14 January 1948, succeeding William Brown. Pasha's strategy to advance towards Kargil, Dras, and Zojila was pivotal in countering enemy reinforcements and maintaining offensive actions in Ladakh. With the Zojila Pass cut off, India's link with Leh was severed and the entire Ladakh Wazarat fell into the hands of Aslam and his men. These results were substantially achieved by 19 May 1948. India was able to save Leh only by raising a local militia, Ladakh Scouts, and constructing an emergency airstrip for receiving armaments.

By June 1948, Pasha's forces had made significant advances into Indian territory. However, General Gracey, the C-in-C of the Pakistan Army, was bewildered by the extent of Pasha's incursions into Indian territory. Consequently, he decided to halt further territorial expansion, and ordered Pasha to return to Pakistan in July 1948.

In the 1970s, Aslam Khan, now a timber businessman, was arrested in Muzaffarabad, falsely accused of theft and later imprisoned in a remote place in Gilgit Agency. The ordeal was orchestrated by Prime Minister Zulfikar Ali Bhutto, who thought Aslam was financing Asghar Khan's politics. Aslam's timber had been seized, essentially making him go out of business. Aslam was one of several siblings and family members of Asghar Khan who were harassed by Bhutto throughout his reign.

== Early life ==
Aslam Khan was born in Jammu on 27 August 1918 into an Afridi Pashtun family to Brigadier Rehmatullah Khan and his third wife Gulam Fatima. Aslam's father, Brigadier Rehmatullah of the Jammu and Kashmir State Forces, was instrumental in bringing Gilgit, Hunza and Skardu under the control of the Jammu and Kashmir (princely state).

Aslam Khan was the second son of Brigadier Rehmatullah Khan and first son of Gulam Fatima. Aslam had 12 siblings.

== Personal life ==
In 1944, Aslam married Nawabzadi Fareeda Begum, the daughter of the Nawab of Serat and Bela. They have five children, two sons and three daughters. Arif Aslam Khan, the eldest, serves as the Chairman of Shangrila Resort in Skardu.

Fareeda Begum died on 6 September 1989 and Aslam Khan is buried near her at the resort.

== Military career ==
=== Jammu Kashmir State Forces ===
Troops of the 5th Infantry Division (India) advancing during the march on Kalemyo. Aslam Khan seen at 0:18—0:22, holds a microphone and sits on the ground with his Signaller (1945)

Aslam Khan was commissioned into the Jammu and Kashmir State Forces in 1939 after passing out from the Indian Military Academy. He was part of the 4th Jammu and Kashmir Fateh Shibji infantry battalion and was deployed to Rattu for two years.

During World War II, Major Aslam captured the Kennedy Peak in October 1944, which the Americans had failed to capture. The victory celebrations were held jointly with the First Punjabis of the British Indian Army and Aslam Khan danced with Major Daler Singh Bajwa of the State Forces and Major Gul Rehman of First Punjabis.

==== Military Cross ====
Narain Singh Sambyal recommended that Aslam Khan be awarded the Military Cross.

=== British Indian Army ===
After World War II, Aslam opted for the British Indian Army. Here, he was the General Staff Officer II in Ranchi. In 1945, he graduated from the Staff College, Quetta.

=== Pakistan Army ===
Following the Partition of British India in 1947, Aslam Khan transferred his service to the Pakistan Army.

=== Indo-Pak war of 1947–1948 ===
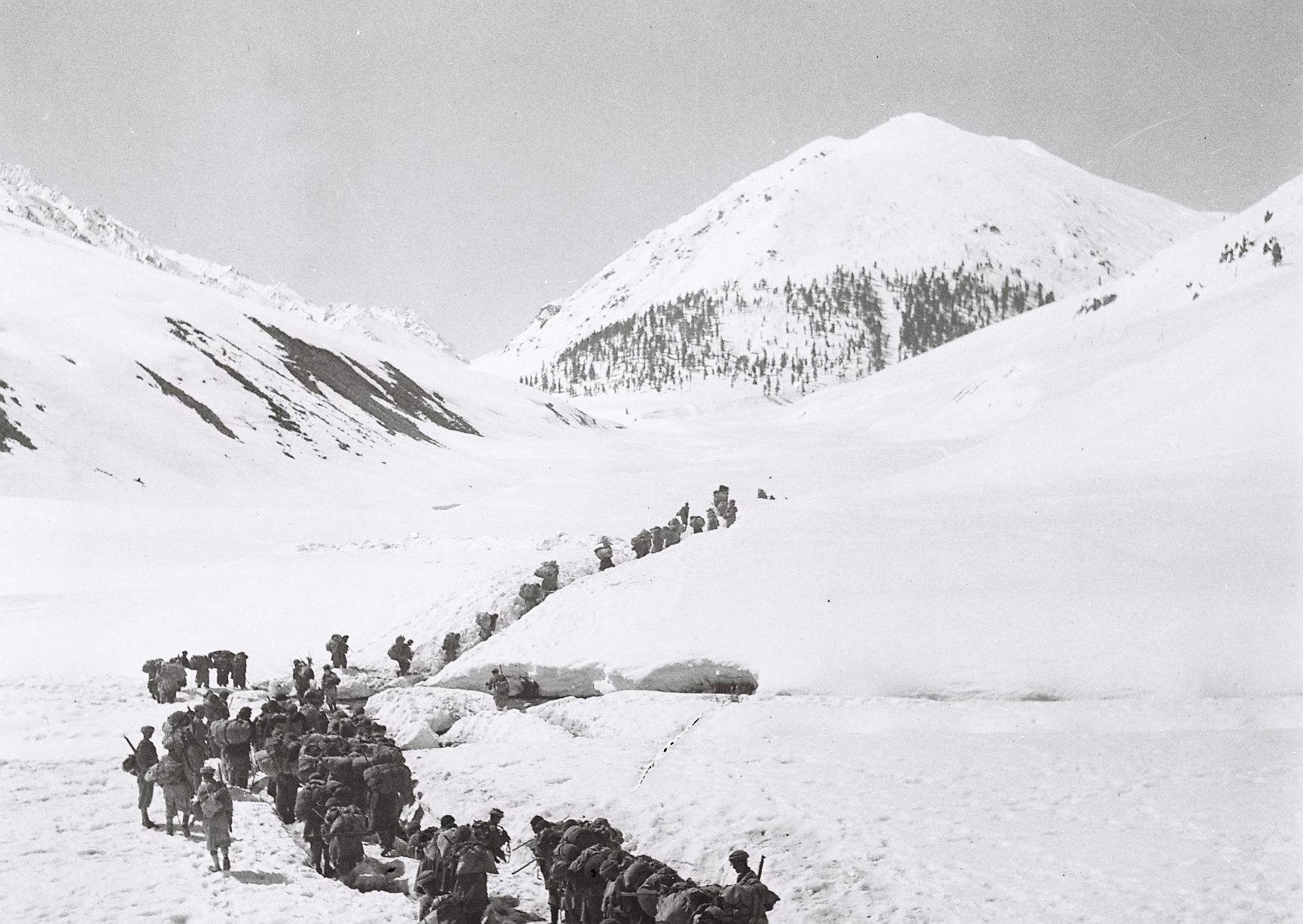
Colonel Pasha travels through the Deosai Mountains with his troops (1947)

When Gilgit Baltistan’s provisional government sought to join Pakistan in 1947, Aslam was selected for a critical mission: to defend and expand the newly acquired territories. At the time, he was serving in the Uri sector. He was stripped of his rank in the Pakistan Army with the promise that it would be restored if he succeeded and came back alive. Aslam Khan reportedly went on leave around 21 October 1947. On his way to Srinagar, at Lohar Gali, he encountered the Pashtun tribal invasion led by Khurshid Anwar and chose to join the invasion force, becoming the second-in-command. The two then encountered Captain Mohammad Azam Khan, the C Company commander tasked with attacking Baramulla on 26 October 1947, and he joined them.

Following the accession of Jammu and Kashmir to India, Indian troops were airlifted on 27 October to repel the invasion. The 1st Sikh regiment of the Indian Army, commanded by Lt. Col. Dewan Ranjit Rai, moved to Baramulla immediately upon landing. Aslam Khan's skillful use of captured mortars disrupted their initial defense, leading to the death of Col. Ranjit Rai at the hands of Aslam Khan's men. The 1st Sikhs subsequently withdrew to Patan, where they established a defensive position. The troops later killed Rajinder Singh (brigadier). As more Indian troops were flown in daily, they eventually counterattacked and pushed the tribal forces back beyond Uri by 7 November, securing the Kashmir Valley.

Meanwhile, in the Gilgit Agency, located in the northern part of Jammu and Kashmir, the Gilgit Scouts under Major Major William Brown's command rebelled on 1 November 1947, detaining the State's governor Brigadier Ghansara Singh who surrendered to Babar Khan of the Gilgit Scouts. The Muslim troops from the Bunji garrison, led by Mirza Hassan Khan, joined the rebellion, resulting in the elimination of non-Muslim personnel. On 16 November, Pakistan dispatched a Political Agent, Khan Mohammad Alam Khan, to assume control, bringing Gilgit under Pakistan's effective administration.

Aslam Khan told journalist Smith, who reported in the London Daily Express on 10 November, "you can describe me as a deserter from the Pakistan Army."

Adopting the nom-de-guerre Colonel Pasha, he arrived in Gilgit on 30 November 1947, accompanied by his younger brother, Major Anwar Khan, who was appointed Brigade Major for administering logistics, and Captain Azmat Ali, assigned as Deputy Quartermaster for general administration. Pasha’s initial objective was to raise an Azad force from local personnel, including members of the Gilgit Scouts. Despite challenges, such as the reluctance of Lieutenant Colonel Abdul Majeed Khan to cooperate, Major Ehsan Ali quickly aligned with Pasha’s objectives.

Pasha’s mission also involved assessing the local situation and establishing a military base to enforce the authority of the Political Agent, Khan Mohammad Alam Khan. To this end, he met with the key officers of the Scouts, including Colonel Hasan Khan, Major Ehsan Ali, and Lieutenant Colonel Abdul Majeed Khan. Although Majeed was hesitant to cooperate for various reasons, Major Ehsan promptly offered his full support. Pasha was determined to mobilize all available personnel in Gilgit, discuss strategic plans, and push forward with his offensive operations. One of his proposals was to send Major Ehsan to Ladakh, and he also suggested advancing towards Gurez for raids on Bandipur. Before any of these actions could be initiated, Pasha needed to prepare. With these ideas in mind, Pasha returned to GHQ Rawalpindi on 3 December 1947, to request material support. However, he was only provided with a sum of four thousand rupees by Major General Sher Khan.

Despite the limited resources, Pasha managed them efficiently. Half of the rupees he received were used to purchase blankets and old clothes from Raja Bazar in Rawalpindi, which were then airdropped to Bunji. Pasha’s forces, numbering around 2,000 men, were equipped with captured weapons from the Jammu and Kashmir State Forces, and others were trained using dummy wooden rifles.

Under his command, two key forces were formed: the Tiger Force, led by Colonel Hasan Khan, aimed at striking the Bandipur area to deter Indian advances, and the Ibex Force, under Major Ehsan Ali, tasked with securing Skardu and advancing toward Kargil and Ladakh. Despite severe winter conditions, including snow up to fifteen feet thick, Pasha’s forces, particularly the Eskimo Force composed of soldiers from Hunza and Yasin, were trained to operate in these extreme conditions by wrapping their legs with rugs. These soldiers, led by Lieutenant Shah Khan, slept on the 12,000 feet high snowy Deosai Mountains and launched surprise attacks on enemy Indian positions and captured vital supplies such as food, clothing, and weapons.

Pasha’s operational approach was characterized by adaptability to the evolving battlefield. For instance, when the Ibex Force was stalled at Skardu, Pasha moved his headquarters to Chilam and continued training his troops in the surrounding snowfields. His detailed knowledge of the terrain enabled him to execute well-coordinated ambushes, such as the one led by Subedar Mohammad Ali at Thurgo Pari, where his small platoon of 60 men successfully ambushed an Indian battalion under Colonel Kirpal Singh by positioning sections of soldiers behind boulders on opposing hills. The coordinated volley of fire from both sides overwhelmed the enemy, resulting in their retreat.

Following Colonel Mirza Hassan Khan's successful control of the Gurez-Astor route and positioning at Tragbal Pass, the next critical objective was to advance towards Kargil, Dras, and Zojila. This was necessary to counter the enemy's efforts to reinforce their troops in Skardu. To this end, Colonel Pasha instructed Major Ehsan Ali to swiftly capture Skardu and push forward along the Indus Valley route towards Parkuta, Kharmong, and Ladakh. When Major Ehsan encountered difficulties in Skardu, Colonel Pasha dispatched the Eskimo Force to Kargil and Zojila to continue the mission.

Pasha mobilized all available troops across various sectors, including sending platoons from Skardu to expedite the operation. The battles fought in this region were significant, and Colonel Pasha's strategy effectively closed the Zojila Pass which cut off India's link with Leh and Pasha's troops maintained offensive actions throughout Ladakh. These results were substantially achieved by 19 May 1948. India was able to save Leh only by raising a local militia, Ladakh Scouts, and constructing an emergency airstrip for receiving armaments. Although the main headquarters could not be occupied due to Indian air superiority, Pasha's forces surrounded the capital and advanced southward to Padam, approaching Jammu.

Pasha’s efforts secured the Northern Areas and extended the frontiers to the gates of Kashmir. By June 1948, he had advanced so far that he was on the verge of entering Indian territory in Himachal Pradesh, a move he communicated to General Headquarters in Rawalpindi with the message: "Attacking Himachal Pradesh." However, General Douglas Gracey, the C-in-C of the Pakistan Army, was "bewildered" and decided against further territorial gains, leading to Pasha’s recall in July 1948.

==== Hilal-e-Jurat ====
On 29 May 1949, Brigadier M. Sher Khan MC recommended that Aslam Khan should be awarded the Hilal-e-Jurat.

=== Post-war career ===
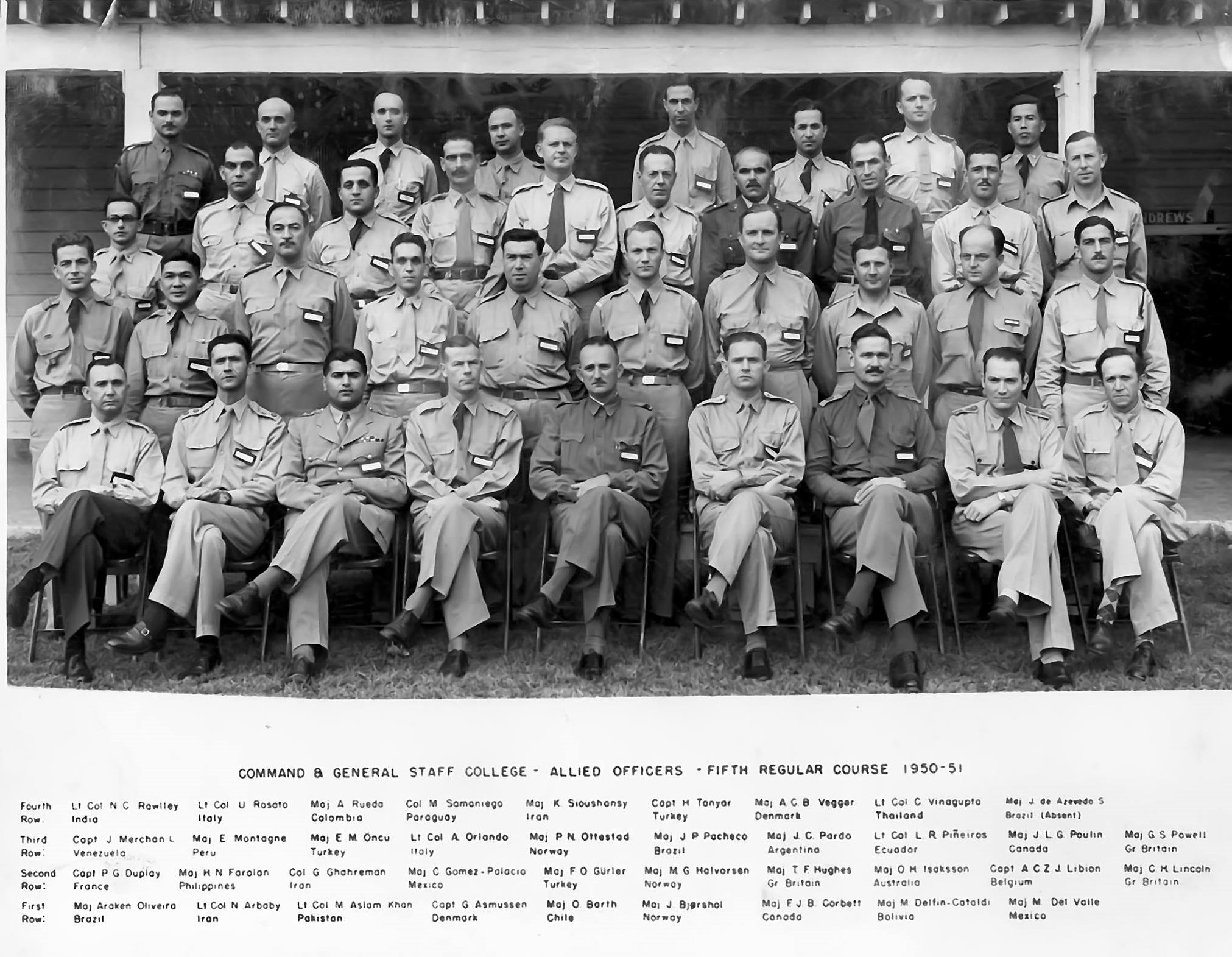
Lt Col M. Aslam Khan at the CGSC (1950-51)

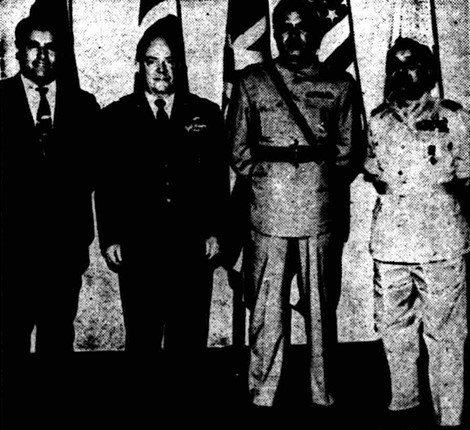
Pakistan Army officers concluded their tour of duty with the Combined Military Planning Staff of CENTO in Ankara. From left: Brigadier Aslam, USAF Chief of Staff Major General Elvin S. Ligon Jr., C.M.P.S. Col. A. A. Malik, and Wing Commander S. I. R. Bokhari (1962)

His father, Brigadier Rehmatullah Khan, was imprisoned in Kashmir under suspicion of being an "enemy agent." He was repatriated to Pakistan on 2 December 1948 as part of a prisoner exchange for an Indian Air Force pilot. Major Daler Singh Bajwa, Aslam Khan's dancing partner from the 1945 victory celebrations, bid them farewell. Rehmatullah Khan's property, including his vehicles, was seized by the State. The family's two cars were later used by Sheikh Abdullah and D. P. Dhar.

On 15 September 1949, Lt Col Aslam Khan succeeded James Wilson as Private Secretary to General Gracey, the Commander-in-Chief of the Pakistan Army. From 1950 to 1951, Khan attended the US Army Command and General Staff College. He was promoted to Brigadier in 1954 at age 36.

In the book, Pakistan: Jinnah to the Present Day, R. C. Majumdar recalled that in the fall of 1957, the Pakistan army was deployed in Operation Close Door to combat smuggling, with civil magistrates trying the offenders. He had an argument with Brigadier Aslam Khan, who commanded 13th Baluch Jessore Garrison, when Aslam justified the operation's success by the quantity of materials seized by his soldiers.

On 7 August 1959, Brigadier Aslam Khan was appointed Chief of War Plans at Central Treaty Organization (CENTO) Headquarters in Ankara, succeeding Brigadier Gulzar Ahmed. Khan retired in 1962.

== Later life and death ==
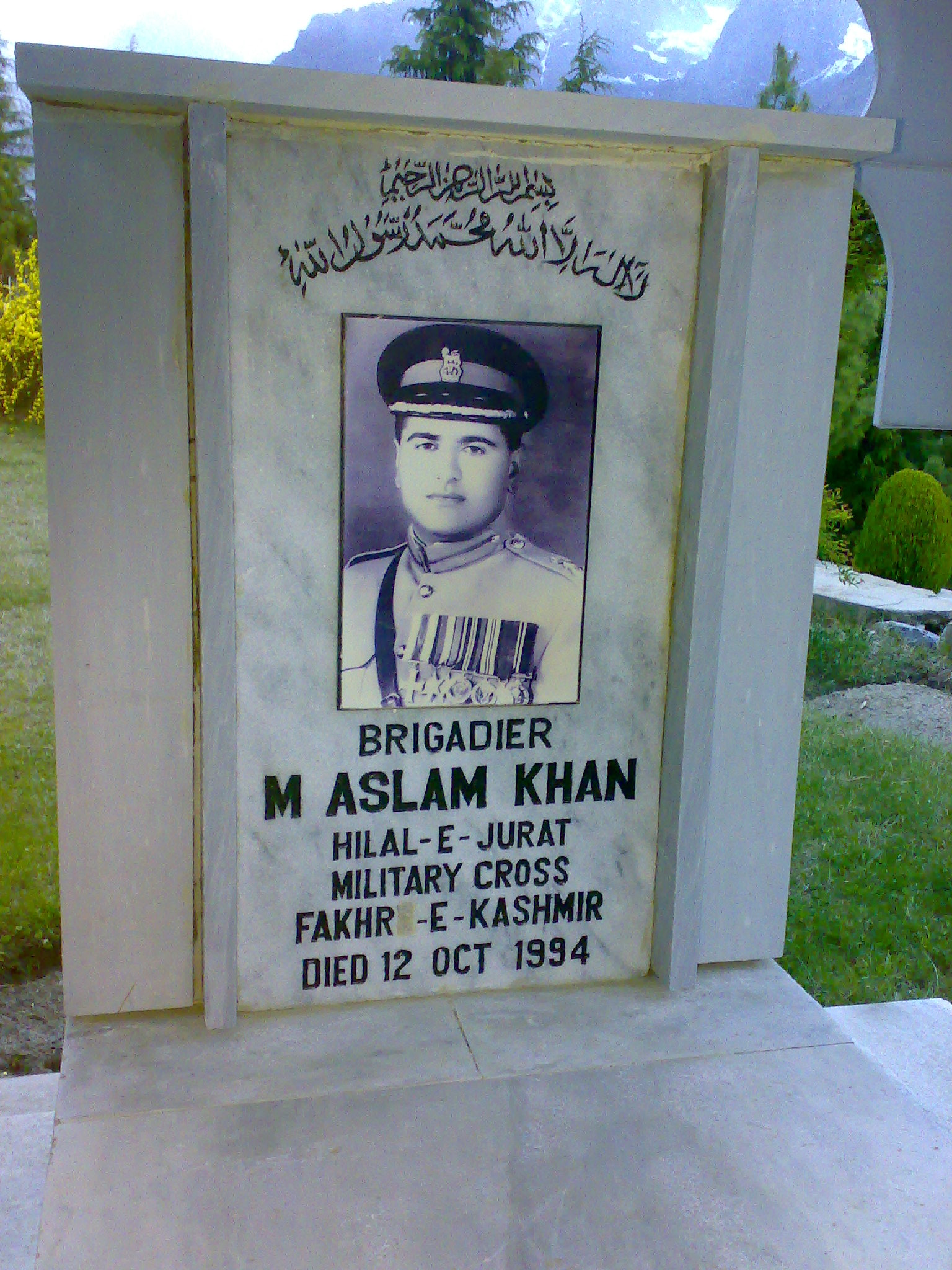
Aslam Khan's grave at the Shangrila Resort

After retirement, Aslam Khan eschewed "politics", and worked for the development of tourism in Gilgit Baltistan. He founded the Shangrila Resort in Skardu, taking inspiration from James Hilton's novel Lost Horizon. It is now among the top tourist destinations in Pakistan and has been managed by his son Arif Aslam Khan since his death.

Aslam died on 12 October 1994 at 11:10PM, at the age of 76, from Cirrhosis.

== Awards and decorations ==
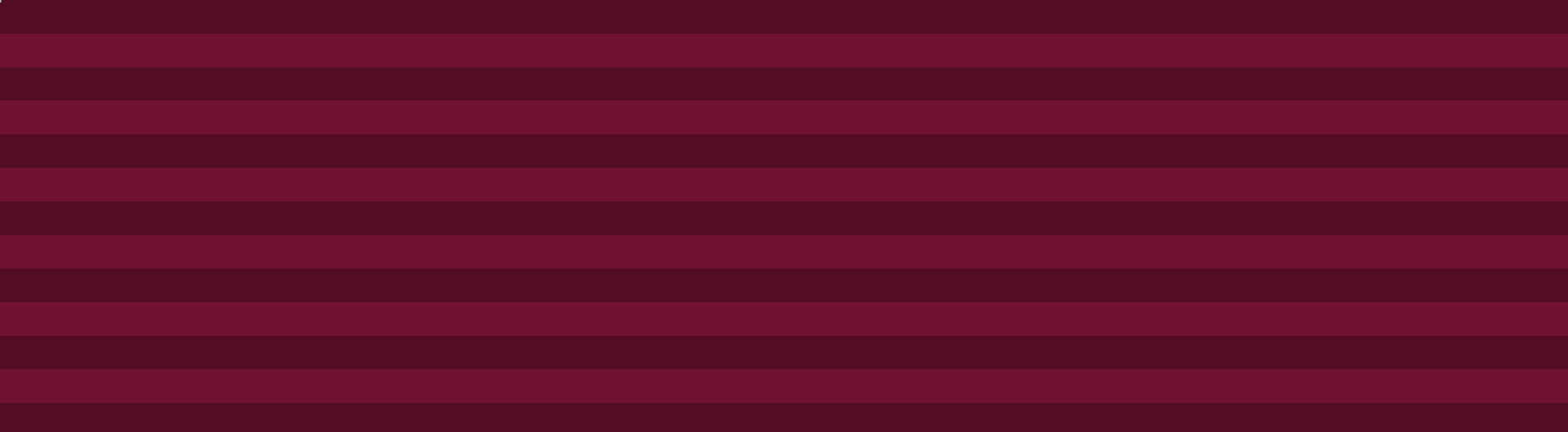
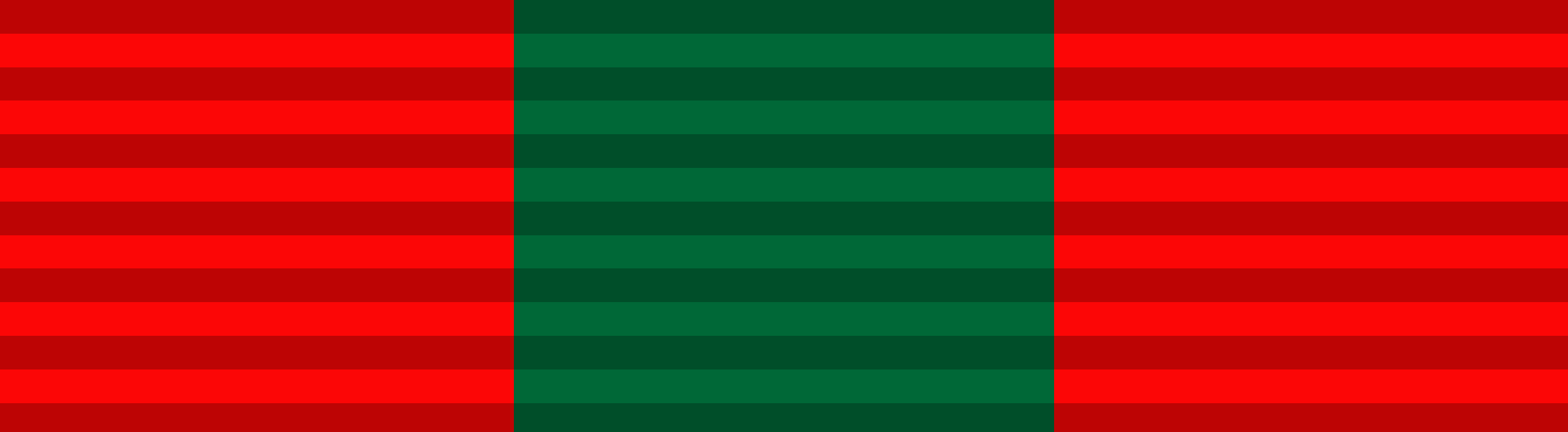

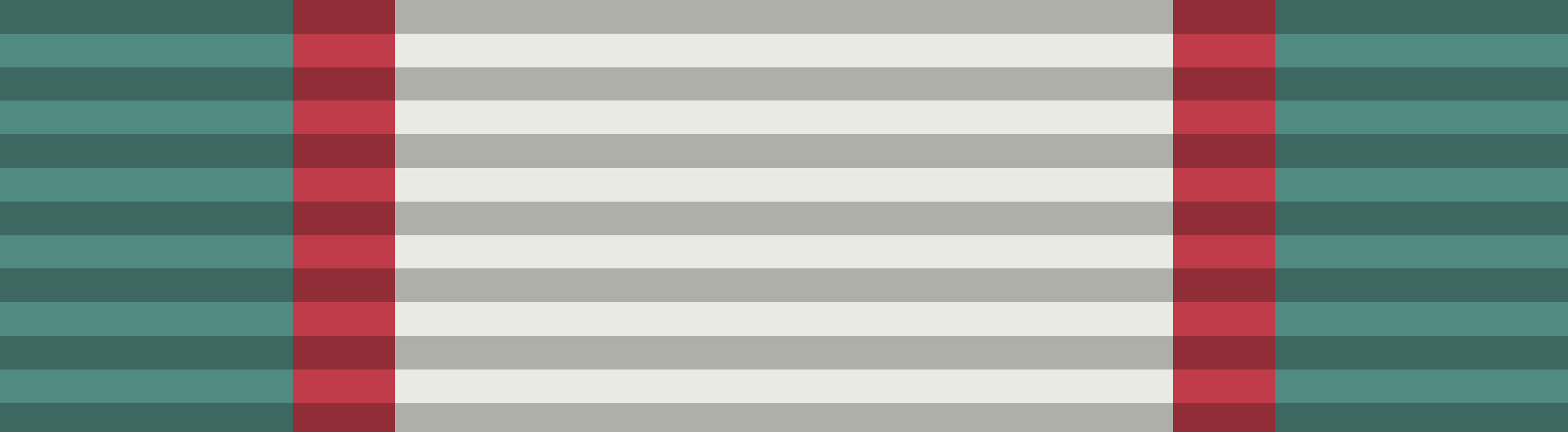

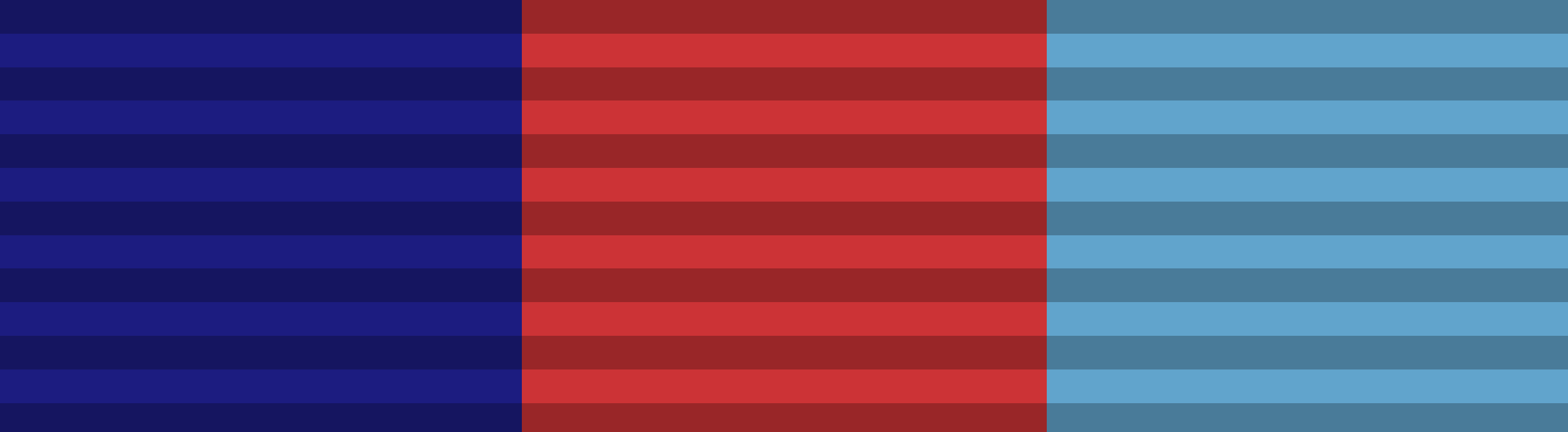

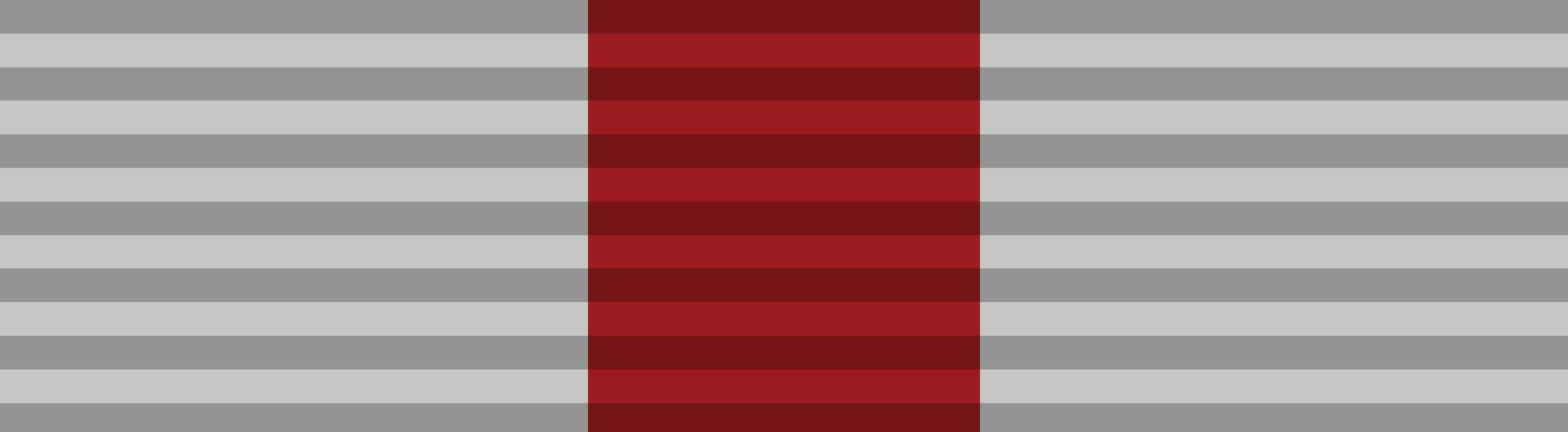

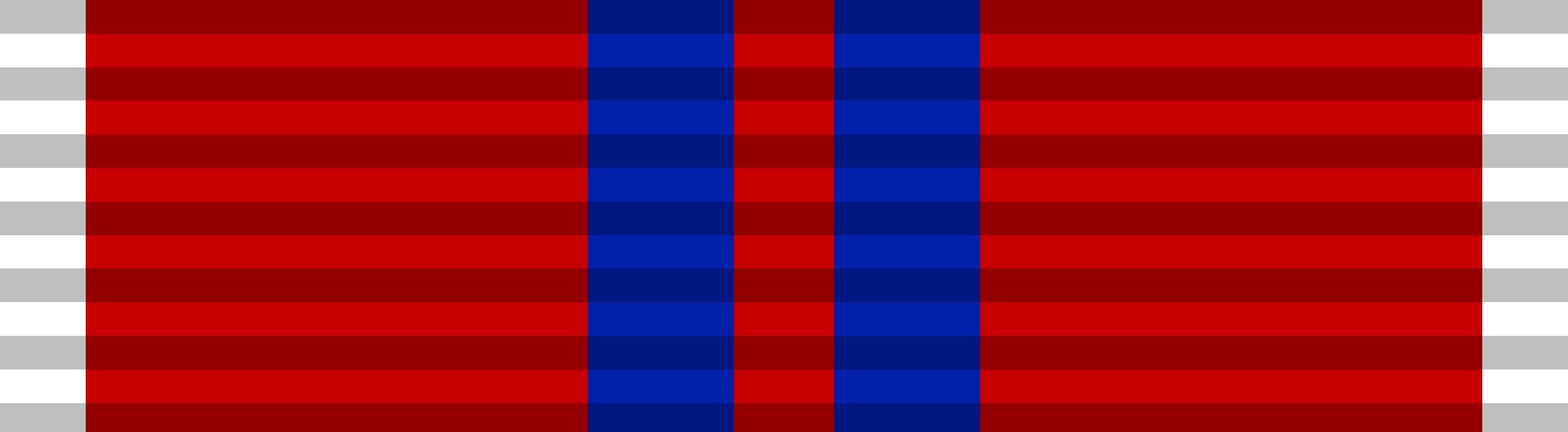

Military Cross (MC) (awarded for GALLANTRY); 1944	Fakhr-e-Kashmir (Honour of Kashmir) 1948		Hilal-e-Jurat (Crescent of Courage) 1949
India General Service Medal (North West Frontier 1937–39 Clasp)	Burma Star 1939-1945	1939–1945 Star	Defence Medal; 1939-1945
War Medal 1939-1945	India Service Medal 1939–1945	Staff College, Quetta Student's Medal 1945	Pakistan Medal (Pakistan Tamgha) 1947
Tamgha-e-Diffa (Defence Medal) First Kashmir War Clasp	Kashmir Commemoration Medal 1947-1949	Queen Elizabeth II Coronation Medal 1953	Tamgha-e-Qayam-e-Jamhuria (Republic Commemoration Medal) 1956
