= Mirza Hassan Khan =

Pakistani army officer

Colonel Mirza Hassan Khan TJ MC
- مرزا حسن خان
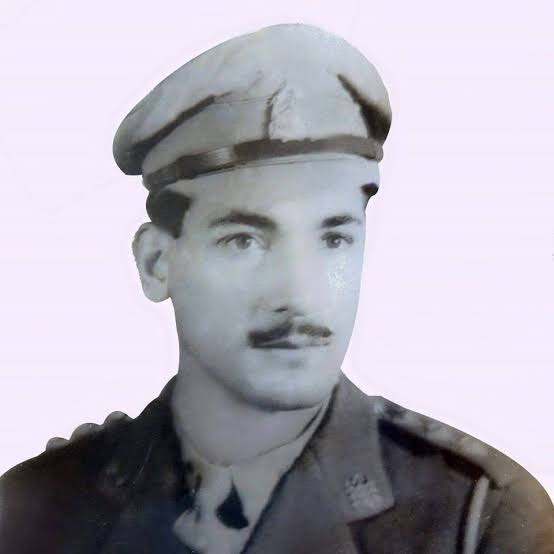
- Born: 27 January 1919; Gilgit
- Died: 19 November 1983 (aged 64); Gilgit, Northern Areas (now Gilgit-Baltistan)
- Burial place: Chinar Bagh, Gilgit
- Alma mater: Sri Pratap College; Indian Military Academy
- Military career
- Allegiance: Jammu and Kashmir (1938–1947); Pakistan (1947–1953)
- Branch: Jammu and Kashmir State Forces; Pakistan Army
- Service years: 1938–1953
- Rank: Colonel
- Nicknames: Fateh-e-Gilgit wa Baltistan (Liberator of Gilgit-Baltistan)
- Units: 4th J & K Infantry
- Commands: 6th J & K Infantry; Gilgit Scouts; 7 AK Regiment; 4/15 Punjab Regiment; 2/15 Punjab Regiment
- Conflicts: World War II; Burma campaign; Indo-Pakistani War of 1947; Operation Datta Khel
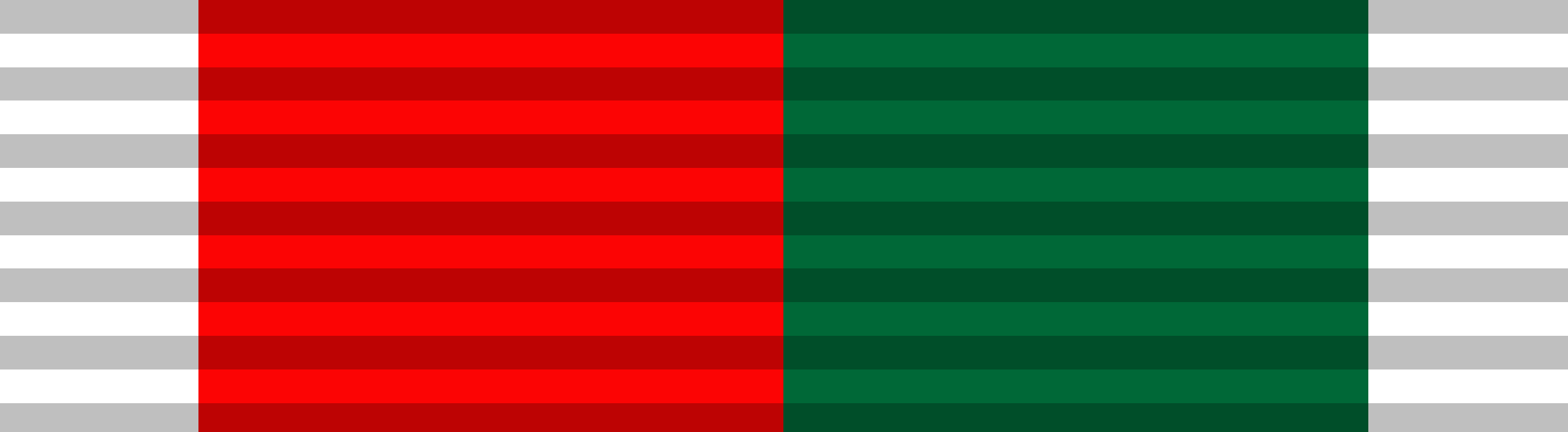
- Awards: Military Cross Tamgha-i-Jurat

Mirza Hassan Khan (Urdu: مرزا حسن خان) was an officer of the 6th Infantry of the Jammu and Kashmir State Forces. Placed at Bunji in the Gilgit wazarat (now Astore District, Gilgit-Baltistan), Khan rebelled against the Maharaja's regime after his accession to India and participated in the overthrow of the governor of Gilgit in November 1947. He later fought in the First Kashmir War as part of Gilgit rebel forces under the command of Colonel Aslam Khan and rose to become a colonel in the Pakistan Army. After leaving the army, he founded the Gilgit League to protest against the Pakistan's ad-hoc administration of Gilgit-Baltistan.

== Early life ==
Mirza Hassan Khan was born in Gilgit in 1919. His father, Mirza Taj Muhammad Khan, belonged to the Rono family of Gilgit , a sub-tribe of the Jarral Rajput Royal Family. His mother was from Nagar.

Khan had early education in Gilgit and then went to Srinagar. However, his father died at this time and he was taken to Poonch by Wazir Mir Husein Shah. He studied in J.V. High School there and stood first among all students in the district. Afterwards, he entered the Sri Pratap College in Srinagar.

While studying in college, he decided to become a soldier and went to Jammu to enrol as a sepoy. But upon the advice of Col. Mirza Faqirullah, he applied for the king's commission in the army. After studying at the Indian Military Academy at Dehradun in 1937–38, he joined the Jammu and Kashmir State Forces.

== Jammu and Kashmir State Forces ==
Khan entered the service of Jammu and Kashmir State Forces in 1938. He took commission from Indian Military Academy Dehradun as second lieutenant in 2nd Jammu & Kashmir Infantry of Maharaja's Army in 1938. He was promoted to the rank of captain and posted to 4th J & K Infantry on 21 Dec 1941, and as major/company commander in the 4th J & K Infantry on 3 Nov 1943.

During World War II, he was sent to Burma as part of the 4th Kashmir Infantry Division. For his gallantry in the Burma action, he was awarded Burmese Star, M. D. and M. C. After returning from Burma, Khan felt that the Maharaja was cold towards the Muslim officers that returned from the war. He was posted to Bhimber as part of the 6th Kashmir Infantry. Here he became involved with a group of Muslim officers that plotted to overthrow the Maharaja's regime. A revolutionary council was set up in 1946 and Hassan Khan was made its chairman. The group decided to act when the British handed power over to the Dominions of India and Pakistan, by simultaneously attacking and occupying the military cantonments in their respective areas. However, the Maharaja's government transferred all the officers to new locations before that time and the plot was foiled.

It has also been said that Major Aslam Khan, who was supposed to act in Jammu, left the service of State Forces and moved to the (undivided) British Indian Army. Thus a key part of the revolution went missing. Hassan Khan was transferred to the Badami Bagh Cantonment in Srinagar in July 1947.

== Gilgit freedom movement ==
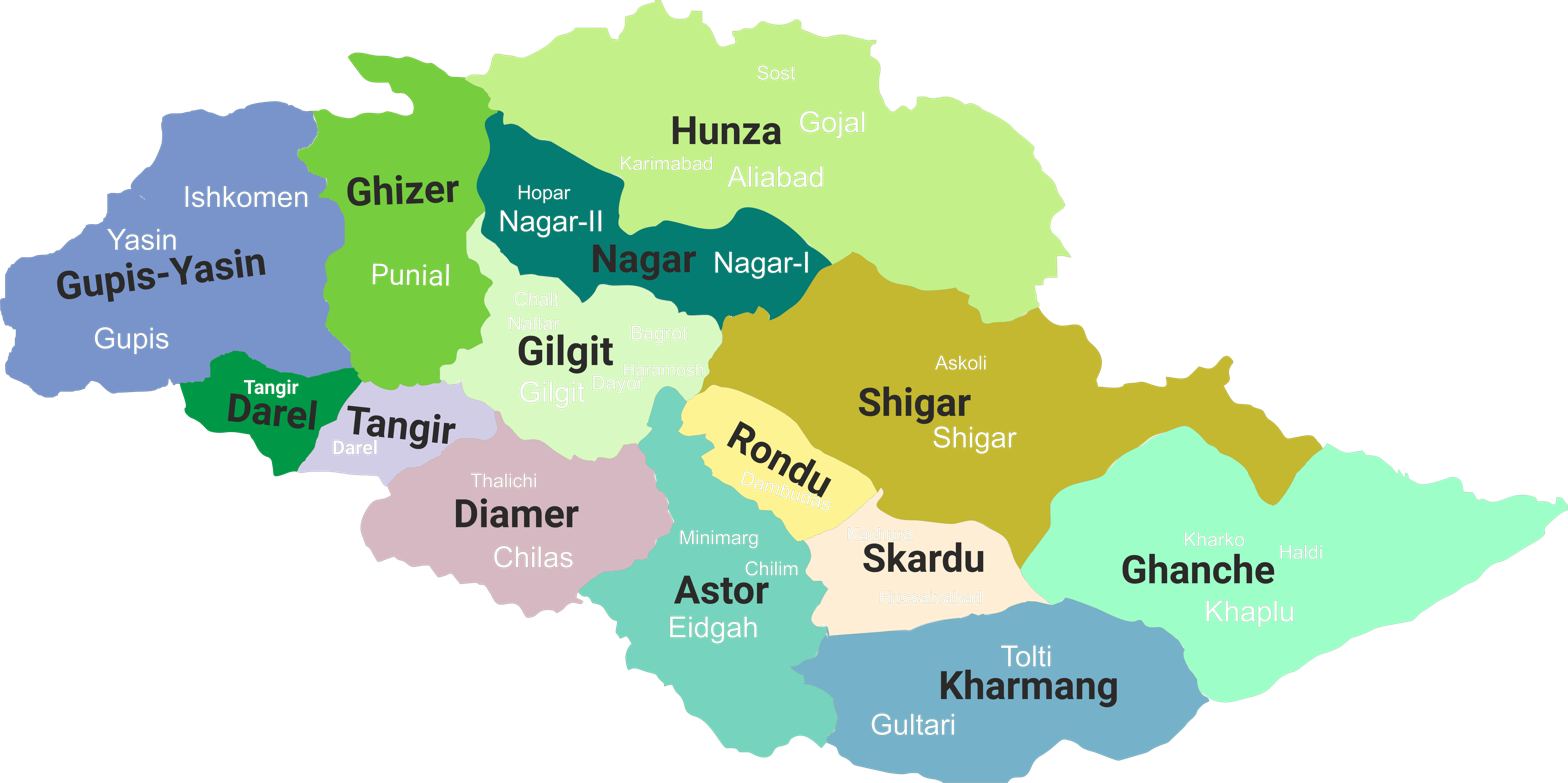
Map of Gilgit-Baltistan in 2019

In July 1947, the British government terminated the 60-year lease of the Gilgit Agency and returned the region to the Maharaja. The Maharaja's administration posted Brigadier Ghansara Singh as the governor to Gilgit. It also sent the 6th Infantry to Bunji (in the Astore District, immediately south of the Indus River across from Gilgit). The battalion was commanded by Colonel Abdul Majeed. Hassan Khan commanded a company within it and was found to be actively canvassing for Pakistan. (Note: Of the five companies of the 6th Infantry battalion, one was retained at Leh, a partial company was sent to Skardu, and the remaining forces were at Bunji. They consisted of two Muslim companies, commanded by Hassan Khan and Nek Alam, and two non-Muslim companies, commanded by Baldev Singh and Sukhdev Singh.)

At the beginning of October, a serious brawl broke out between the Muslim and non-Muslim troops in the Bunji garrison. The Maharaja's administration ordered that Hassan Khan should be sent to Srinagar under arrest. Governor Ghansara Singh, however, had the order annulled on the grounds that it would aggravate the situation.

=== The Gilgit Coup ===
Towards the end of October, by which time the Pakistani tribal invasion was in progress via Muzaffarabad, governor Ghansara Singh became apprehensive of the loyalties of the Gilgit Scouts based in Gilgit, and asked Col. Abdul Majeed to send a contingent of Sikh troops. Hassan Khan persuaded Majeed that he should go in place of Sikhs, with the argument that the arrival of Sikh troops would further inflame the Gilgit Scouts. With Majeed's agreement, he set out to Gilgit. It appears that by the time he reached Gilgit, the governor was already overpowered. Nevertheless Hassan Khan sided with Major William Brown of the Gilgit Scouts and later gave himself full credit as the leader of the coup.

On 2 November 1947, Mirza Hassan Khan and other officers of the rebel forces, announced a provisional government, with Raja Shah Rais Khan as the President and Mirza Hassan Khan as the Commander-in-Chief. William Brown was told that, being a non-Muslim, he could not hold any post in the government. In his autobiography, Khan ascribed to himself a central role in the coup. Scholar Yaqoob Khan Bangash doubts his account.

Soon after the coup, William Brown telegraphed the Pakistan government in the North-West Frontier Province informing them of the developments and asking them to take over the administration of Gilgit. Pakistan's Political Agent, Khan Mohammad Alam Khan, arrived on 16 November and dismissed the provisional government. Thus the Gilgit Agency was absorbed into Pakistan. Mirza Hassan Khan was appointed the military governor for the Bunji sector and asked to focus on that area solely.

=== First Kashmir War ===
On 19 January 1948, the Azad Kashmir provisional government appointed Major Mohammad Aslam Khan, replacing Major William Brown as the commander of Gilgit Scouts. Major Aslam organised all the forces in Gilgit into three wings of 400 men each, which were called the Ibex Force, Tiger Force and Eskimo Force. The three forces were ordered to advance along three directions into the state of Jammu Kashmir. Mirza Hassan Khan was put in charge of the Tiger Force, which advanced on the Gilgit-Bunji-Kamri-Gurais-Bandipora axis. The force reached Bandipora on 28 April, but had to withdraw to Tragbal. When Gurais was recaptured in June by the Indian forces, the Tiger Force withdrew to Minimarg. He was later promoted lt col in 4/15 Punjab Regiment of the Pakistan Army. Ante Date seniority under decision, and Lt col Azad Forces, commanding officer 7 AK Regiment in 1949.

== Political activism ==
Mirza Hassan Khan Arrested in Rawalpindi conspiracy case from 2/15 Punjab Regiment, tried by special tribunal and dismissed from service with effect from 5 Jan 1953. In 1957, Mirza Hassan Khan founded the Gilgit League, said to be the first political organisation formed to protest the Pakistan's ad hoc administration of Gilgit-Baltistan. The party demanded political freedom and democratic rights, and an end to the Frontier Crimes Regulations. The party was banned by Ayub Khan's martial law administration.

Subsequently, Khan joined the Pakistan People's Party. He was arrested by the Zulfiqar Ali Bhutto government in 1973 due to political differences and put in prison.

== Honours and awards ==
According to a report on Radio Pakistan, Khan was awarded a Military Cross for bravery by the British Indian Army in 1944, when he fought in Burma as part of the Jammu and Kashmir troops in the Second World War. He was awarded the title of Fakhr-e-Kashmir by the Azad Kashmir government and Tamgha-i-Jurat by the Pakistani government.

== Bibliography ==
- Ahmad, Sajjad (2015), "Core-Periphery Relationship: The Post-1973 State of Pakistan and Nationalism in Gilgit-Baltistan", Pakistan Perspectives, 20 (2): 99–113
- Bangash, Yaqoob Khan (2010), "Three Forgotten Accessions: Gilgit, Hunza and Nagar", The Journal of Imperial and Commonwealth History, 38 (1): 117–143, doi:10.1080/03086530903538269, S2CID 159652497
- Dani, Ahmad Hasan (2001), History of Northern Areas of Pakistan: Upto 2000 A.D., Sang-e-Meel Publications, ISBN 978-969-35-1231-1
  - Dani, Ahmad Hasan (1991), History of Northern Areas of Pakistan (2nd ed.), National Institute of Historical and Cultural Research
- Hussain, Altaf (2015), The Gilgit-Baltistan Reforms 2009, Institute for Islamic Heritage and Thought
- Sokefeld, Martin (November 2005), "From Colonialism to Postcolonial Colonialism: Changing Modes of Domination in the Northern Areas of Pakistan", The Journal of Asian Studies, 64 (4): 939–973, doi:10.1017/S0021911805002287, S2CID 161647755
