= Deosai =

Deosai can refer to:

- Deosai National Park, a national park and plateau in Pakistan
- Deosai Mountains, a mountain range in Pakistan
- Deosai Lake, a lake in Deosai National Park
