= 1869 Hawick Burghs by-election =

UK parliamentary by-election

The 1869 Hawick Burghs by-election was held on 4 January 1869. The by-election was held due to the incumbent Liberal MP, George Otto Trevelyan, becoming Civil Lord of the Admiralty. It was retained by Trevelyan who was unopposed.
