= Alexander Laing Brown =

British politician (1851–1930)

Member of Parliament for Hawick Burghs
- In office 1 July 1886 – 4 July 1892
- Preceded by: George Trevelyan
- Succeeded by: Thomas Shaw

Personal details
- Born: 1851
- Died: 1 October 1930 (aged 78–79)
- Relations: William Brown
- Occupation: Politician

Alexander Laing Brown (1851 – 1 October 1930) was a British Liberal Party politician.

== Career ==
He was elected at the 1886 general election as the member of parliament (MP) for Hawick District of Burghs, defeating the sitting Liberal Unionist MP Sir George Otto Trevelyan. Trevelyan opposed Home Rule, while Brown was a strong supporter of Gladstone's policy. Brown defeated Trevelyan by fewer than 50 votes.

At the 1892 general election, Brown did not stand for re-election to the House of Commons.

== Legacy ==
His grandson Major William Brown served with the Gilgit Scouts during the final years of the British Raj.

Parliament of the United Kingdom
Preceded by Sir George Trevelyan	Member of Parliament for Hawick Burghs; 1886 – 1892	Succeeded by Thomas Shaw
