= 1909 Hawick Burghs by-election =

UK Parliamentary by-election

- 5 March 1909

Candidate	Barran	Mackinder
Party	Liberal	Liberal Unionist
Popular vote	3,028	2,508
Percentage	54.7%	45.3%
MP before election
Thomas Shaw
Liberal
Subsequent MP
Sir John Barran
Liberal

Shaw

The 1909 Hawick Burghs by-election was held on 5 March 1909. The by-election was held due to the resignation of the incumbent Liberal MP, Thomas Shaw. It was won by the Liberal candidate John Barran.

== Result ==
Barran

1909 Hawick Burghs by-election
Party	Candidate	Votes	%	±%
Liberal	John Barran	3,028	54.7	−1.4
Liberal Unionist	Halford Mackinder	2,508	45.3	+1.4
Majority		520	9.4	−2.8
Turnout		5,536	92.8	+0.8
Registered electors		5,968		
Liberal hold		Swing	−1.4	
