= Sir John Barran, 2nd Baronet =

British politician (1872–1952)

Sir John Barran Baronet

Member of Parliament for Hawick Burghs
- In office 5 March 1909 – 14 December 1918
- Preceded by: Thomas Shaw
- Succeeded by: Constituency abolished

Personal details
- Born: 16 August 1872 Leeds, Yorkshire West Riding, England
- Died: 8 July 1952 (aged 79) Ripon, North Yorkshire, England
- Party: Liberal Party
- Spouses: Alice Margarita Parks (m. 1902, died) Esther Frances Fisher (m. 1946)
- Relations: John Barran (grandfather)
- Children: 4, including David

Sir John Nicholson Barran, 2nd Baronet (16 August 1872 – 8 July 1952) was a British Liberal Party politician.

== Early life ==
John Nicholson Barran was born on 16 August 1872 in Leeds.

He was the son of John Barran and the grandson of Sir John Barran, 1st Baronet. His mother was Eliza Henrietta Nicholson, daughter of Edward Nicholson. He was educated at Winchester and Trinity College, Cambridge.

== Career ==
He succeeded his grandfather in the baronetcy in 1905.

Barran was elected to the House of Commons at a by-election in March 1909 as the Member of Parliament (MP) for Hawick Burghs

== Personal life ==
He married firstly, at Emmanuel Episcopal Church, Boston on 18 November 1902, Alice Margarita Parks, daughter of Reverend Leighton Parks, rector of Emmanuel church. They had three sons and one daughter. After his first wife's death in 1939, he married secondly in 1946 Esther Frances Fisher, daughter of New Zealand politician Frank Fisher.

His eldest son Sir John Leighton Barran (1904–1974) succeeded in the baronetcy. His youngest son Sir David Barran became a prominent businessman and served as Managing Director and Chairman of Shell.

== Death ==
Barran died in July 1952, aged 79 in Ripon.

== Electoral history ==
1909 Hawick Burghs by-election
Party	Candidate	Votes	%	±%
Liberal	Sir John Barran	3,028	54.7	
Liberal Unionist	Halford John Mackinder	2,508	45.3	
Majority		520	9.4	
Turnout			92.8	
Liberal hold		Swing		

He was re-elected with a large majority in January 1910

January 1910 general election: Hawick Burghs
Party	Candidate	Votes	%	±%
Liberal	Sir John Barran	3,261	59.0	+4.3
Liberal Unionist	James Edward Graham	2,268	41.0	−4.3
Majority		993	18.0	+8.6
Turnout			91.7	−1.1
Liberal hold		Swing	+4.3	

He was returned unopposed in December 1910. He served as Parliamentary Private Secretary to Prime Minister H. H. Asquith from 1910 to 1916. After the war he tried unsuccessfully to return to parliament, standing as Liberal candidate for Kingston upon Hull North West at the general elections of 1922, 1923 and 1924.

1922 general election: Kingston upon Hull North West
Party	Candidate	Votes	%	±%
Unionist	Albert Lambert Ward	14,904	57.1	
Liberal	Sir John Barran	11,204	42.9	
Majority		3,700	14.2	
Turnout				
Unionist hold		Swing		

1923 general election: Kingston upon Hull North West
Party	Candidate	Votes	%	±%
Unionist	Albert Lambert Ward	12,674	50.2	
Liberal	Sir John Barran	12,559	49.8	
Majority		115	0.4	
Turnout			73.7	
Unionist hold		Swing		

1924 general election: Kingston upon Hull North West
Party	Candidate	Votes	%	±%
Unionist	Albert Lambert Ward	15,072	53.3	
Liberal	Sir John Barran	8,080	28.5	
Labour	Ferdinand Louis Kerran	5,151	18.2	
Majority		6,992	24.8	
Turnout			81.2	
Unionist hold		Swing		

Apart from his political career he was a Justice of the Peace for the West Riding of Yorkshire.

Parliament of the United Kingdom
Preceded by Thomas Shaw	Member of Parliament for Hawick Burghs; 1909–1918	Constituency abolished
Baronetage of the United Kingdom
Preceded by John Barran	Baronet (of Chapel Allerton Hall and Queen's Gate); 1905–1952	Succeeded by John Leighton Barran
