= William Brown (British Army officer) =

British Indian Army officer (1922–1984)

Major William Alexander Brown MBE SI(M)
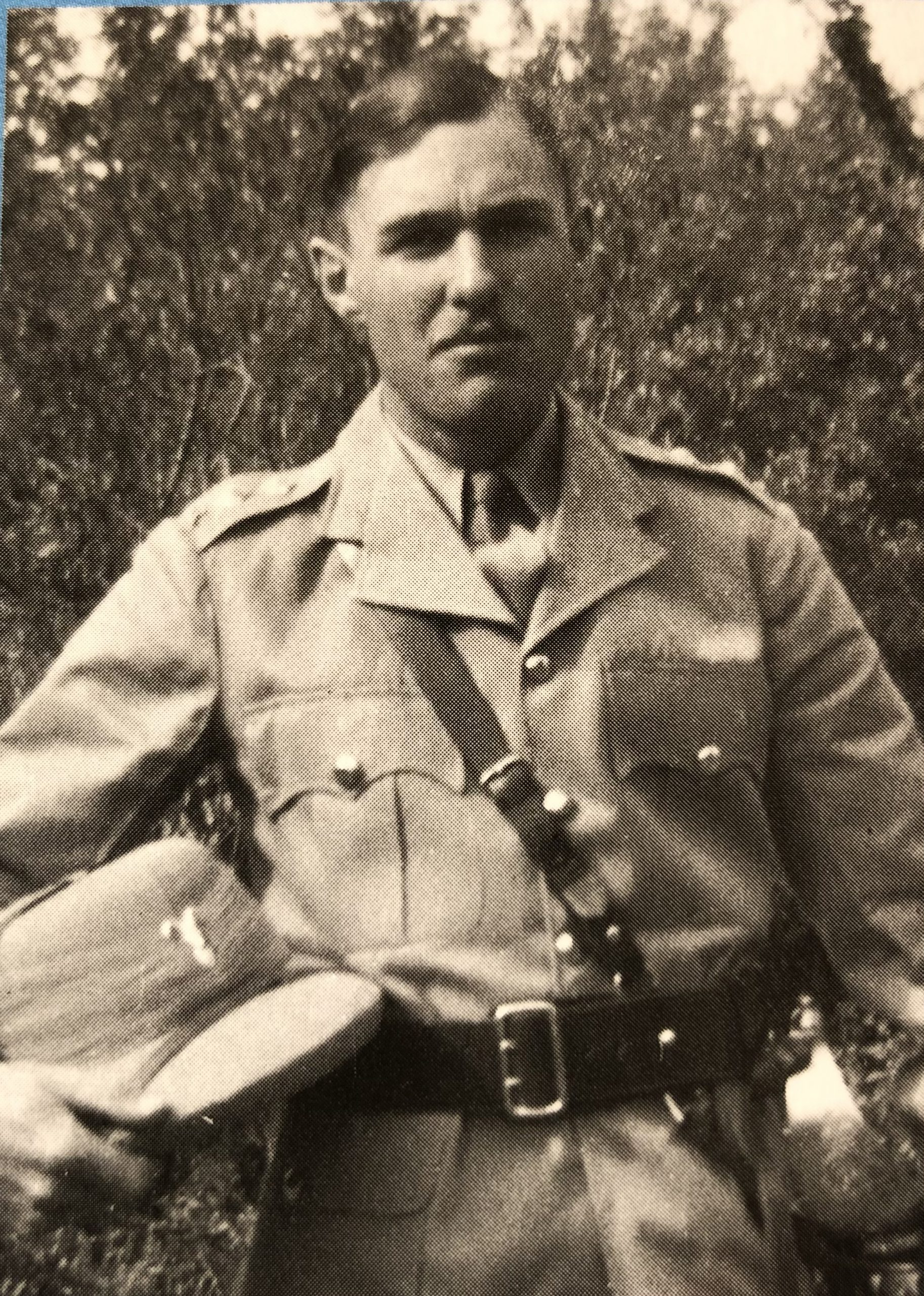
- William Brown as a young officer c. 1942
- Born: 13 December 1922; Melrose, Scotland, United Kingdom
- Died: 5 December 1984 (aged 61); Scotland, United Kingdom
- Military career
- Allegiance: British Raj; Pakistan
- Branch: (British Raj) British Indian Army; Pakistan Army
- Service years: 1941–1959
- Rank: Major
- Commands: 12th Frontier Force Regiment; Frontier Corps; Gilgit Scouts
- Conflicts: First Indo−Pakistani War; 1947 Gilgit rebellion
- Awards: Most Excellent Order of the British Empire (1948); Sitara-i-Imtiaz (1993)

William Alexander Brown MBE SI(M) (13 December 1922 – 5 December 1984) a Scotsman, was a British military officer who served in the Frontier Corps (Gilgit Scouts, South Waziristan Scouts and briefly Chitral Scouts) in north and western frontiers of British India.

He is best known for his actions as Commandant Gilgit Scouts during the Partition of India, when he assisted the locals of the Gilgit Agency and led a coup d'état, codenamed Operation Datta Khel, against Hari Singh, the Maharaja of the erstwhile princely state of Jammu and Kashmir. The successful coup ultimately resulted in the freedom of Gilgit Agency and Astore (part of Gilgit−Baltistan) and in 1948 Baltistan was freed by the enlarged Gilgit Scouts which grew from a strength of 582 to 1600 under his personal stewardship, following the First Indo−Pakistani War.

== Early life and education ==
Brown was born in Melrose, Scotland. His father William Brown had served with the Gordon Highlanders regiment of the British Army during World War I, and was a recipient of the Military Cross. His paternal grandfather Alexander Laing Brown had been a Liberal Unionist member of parliament for the Hawick Burghs between 1886 and 1892. Brown attended St. Mary's School in Melrose and George Watson's College in Edinburgh. Upon finishing his schooling in 1941, he enlisted in the Argyll and Sutherland Highlanders regiment, and sailed for India in December of that year.

== Arrival in British India ==
Following his arrival in India, Brown attended the Officer Cadet Training Unit in Bangalore, and was commissioned as a Second Lieutenant into the 10th/12th Frontier Force Regiment. He soon transferred to the Frontier Corps of Scouts and Militias, where he served with the South Waziristan Scouts in the North-West Frontier Province and became a proficient speaker of the Pashto language. In 1943, Brown was posted to the Gilgit Agency, where he would spend the next three years and also learn the Shina and Burushaski languages. In 1946, he served briefly with the Tochi Scouts in North Waziristan, and in 1947, he was posted to Chitral as the Acting Commandant of the Scouts.

== Partition of India and First Indo−Pakistani War ==
On 1 August 1947, 65 year lease of Gilgit Sub-Division was revoked by the British Paramount Power and it was transferred back to the princely state of Jammu and Kashmir. The state's Maharaja, Hari Singh, appointed Brigadier Ghansara Singh on 18 July to govern the area on his behalf. The Partition of India took place in August of that year, which divided the former British colony into a Hindu-majority India and a Muslim-majority Pakistan. On 26 October 1947, the Maharaja without taking into account the overwhelming Pro-Pakistan Muslim-majority sentiments of Hunza, Nagar, Ghizer, Yasin, Ishkoman, Punial, Chilas, Darel and Tangir acceded to India.

Dogra rule was unpopular and disliked in every part of the princely state outside of the Jammu region; Prem Nath Bazaz, a Kashmiri scholar, describes Dogra rule in his book as:

"The Dogras have always considered Jammu as their home and Kashmir as the conquered country…[T]hey established a sort of Dogra imperialism in the State in which all non-Dogra communities and classes were given the humble place of inferiors…Dogra imperialism brought nothing but misery, thraldom, physical and mental deterioration in its wake…"

On hearing of the decision, Brown urged Ghansara Singh to ascertain the wishes of the Gilgit Agency's Muslim community over the accession, and warned him that he may have to take certain measures to avoid large-scale bloodshed. Brown's view on the escalating Kashmir conflict was that the whole of the princely state of Jammu and Kashmir, including Gilgit, should go to Pakistan as the state's population was predominantly Muslim, and that the foundation of Pakistan's existence was the accommodation of Muslim-majority regions in British India. Singh ignored the warning, prompting Brown to put into operation 'Operation Datta Khel'. This operation had been planned on 27 September in Chilas by Brown in consultation with Captain A. S. Mathieson, Brown's colleague in Gilgit Scouts and earlier in the Frontier Corps in North Waziristan.

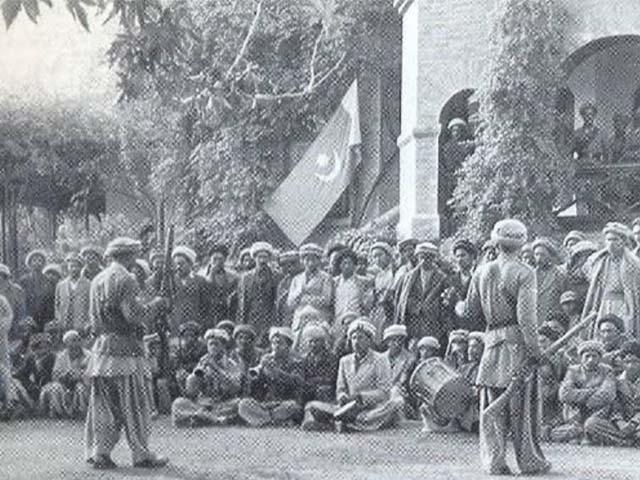
Gilgit Scouts dancing after raising the Pakistani flag at the Residency on 17 November 1947 a day after arrival of Pakistan's first Political Agent Sardar Alam Khan.

Brown was well aware of the anti-Maharaja sentiments among the populace of the Gilgit Agency. On 31 October, the Gilgit Scouts, under command of Brown, surrounded the Gilgit Residency and took Ghansara Singh and staff into protective custody.

Brown on 1 November 1947 informed Chief Minister NWFP of successful revolution in favour of Pakistan requesting response. Brown thwarted plans by a section of his contingent to set up an independent republic called Independent State of Gilgit. On 2 November, he hoisted the Pakistani flag, sewn by the Gilgit Scouts tailor at a public ceremony at Gauhar Aman Shikari and announced the accession of the Gilgit Agency to Pakistan.

On 1 November a strong Gilgit Scouts gasht of 65 men under Subedar Sher Ali had set out as part of Operation Datta Khel from Chilas. After covering 60 miles at dawn on 3 November they decimated 6 J&K picquets at Jaglot and Partab Pul.

On 5 November 6 J&K at Bunji raised the white flag of surrender with some attempting to flee.

On 16 November, the Pakistani government sent Muhammad Alam to take control of the region as a political agent and on 18 November, Hunza and Nagar princely states signed formal instruments of accession to Pakistan. Brown remained in command of the Gilgit Scouts until 12 January 1948, when he was replaced by Aslam Khan.

Brown's actions were strongly condemned by the Indian government who regarded it as an unlawful and unpopular coup, whereas the Pakistani government hailed it claiming that Brown had the full support of the people. Brown himself acknowledged the severity of his actions when he later remarked, "my actions appeared to possess all the elements of high treason. Yet I knew in my own mind that what I had done was right."

Brown is also credited to have saved the Hindu minority in Gilgit from being harmed during the war, taking personal risk in doing so.

In 1998, Brown's diary from his time in Gilgit was published as a book titled The Gilgit Rebellion.

He was belatedly awarded Sitara-e-Pakistan. His widow Margaret Brown received the award in March 1994 from the President of Pakistan in Islamabad.

== Later life and return to the United Kingdom ==
After returning from Gilgit in January 1948, Brown transferred to the Frontier Constabulary, where he served for the next two years. In July 1948, he was awarded the Order of the British Empire by the British government. Brown remained in Pakistan until 1959, when he returned to the United Kingdom with his family. In 1960, he established a livery yard and riding school at St. Boswells in Scotland. Brown died of a heart attack on 5 December 1984, eight days before his 62nd birthday.

The Government of Pakistan posthumously awarded the Sitara-i-Imtiaz to Brown in 1993.

== See also ==
- Indo-Pakistani War of 1947–1948
- Gilgit Scouts
- 1947 Gilgit rebellion
- 12th Frontier Force Regiment
