= Thomas Shaw, 1st Baron Craigmyle =

Scottish politician and judge (1850–1937)

The Right Honourable The Lord Craigmyle PC
- Shaw in 1905

Member of Parliament for Hawick Burghs
- In office 4 July 1892 – 28 February 1909
- Preceded by: Alexander Laing Brown
- Succeeded by: John Nicholson Barran

Solicitor General for Scotland
- In office 1894–1895
- Preceded by: Alexander Asher
- Succeeded by: Andrew Murray

Lord Advocate
- In office December 1905 – February 1909
- Preceded by: Charles Scott Dickson
- Succeeded by: Alexander Ure

Personal details
- Born: Thomas Shaw; 23 May 1850 Dunfermline, Fife, Scotland
- Died: 28 June 1937 (aged 87) Glasgow, Scotland
- Resting place: Torphins Cemetery
- Party: Liberal
- Spouse: Elspeth Forrest (m. 1879)
- Children: 4, including Alexander
- Education: Edinburgh University (MA); St Andrews University (LLD)
- Occupation: Politician; judge

Thomas Shaw, 1st Baron Craigmyle, PC (23 May 1850 – 28 June 1937), known as The Lord Shaw from 1909 to 1929, was a Scottish radical Liberal Party politician and judge.

== Early life and education ==
Shaw was born on 23 May 1850, in Dunfermline, the son of Alexander Shaw. He was educated at the Dunfermline High School. Shaw gained an LLD from St Andrews University in October 1902 and from the University of Aberdeen in 1906. He received a Master of Arts from Edinburgh University in 1874, where he was a Hamilton Fellow in mental philosophy and received the Lord Rector's Prize Essay.

== Career ==
Shaw was appointed an advocate in 1875 and became a Queen's Counsel in 1894.

Shaw sat as Member of Parliament (MP) for Hawick Burghs from 1892 to 1909 and served as Solicitor General for Scotland from 1894 to 1895 and as Lord Advocate from December 1905 to 1909. He resigned from parliament and ministerial office and was created a life peer as Baron Shaw, of Dunfermline in the County of Fife, on 20 February 1909, so that he could sit in the House of Lords and serve as a Lord of Appeal in Ordinary.

Shaw retired from this office in 1929 and was made an hereditary peer as Baron Craigmyle, of Craigmyle in the County of Aberdeen, on 7 March 1929.

== Personal life and death ==
Shaw married Elspeth, daughter of George Forrest, in 1879. Following their marriage, Elspeth assumed the title "Dowager Lady Craigmyle". Elspeth died on 31 May 1939, aged 92, in Woldingham.

He died on 28 June 1937, aged 87, in Glasgow, and was buried in Torphins Cemetery. He was succeeded in the hereditary barony by his son, Alexander.

== Arms ==
Coat of arms of Thomas Shaw, 1st Baron Craigmyle

Crest
A demi-savage holding in his dexter hand a club resting on his shoulder Proper.
Escutcheon
Ermine a fir tree growing out of a mount in base Proper between two piles Azure issuing from a chief Gules charged with a scroll Argent with seal pendant Proper.
Supporters
Misericordia Fidelitas Jus (Mercy Fidelity Right)

== Footnotes ==
- Kidd, Charles, Williamson, David (editors). Debrett's Peerage and Baronetage (1990 edition). New York: St Martin's Press, 1990,

Parliament of the United Kingdom
Preceded by Alexander Laing Brown	Member of Parliament for Hawick Burghs; 1892–1909	Succeeded by Sir John Nicholson Barran
Legal offices
Preceded by Alexander Asher	Solicitor General for Scotland; 1894–1895	Succeeded by Andrew Murray
Preceded by Charles Scott Dickson	Lord Advocate; 1905–1909	Succeeded by Alexander Ure
Peerage of the United Kingdom
New creation	Baron Craigmyle; 1929–1937	Succeeded by Alexander Shaw
