= David Barran =

British chief executive (1912–2002)

Sir David Haven Barran
- Born: 23 May 1912; London, England
- Died: 1 June 2002 (aged 90); London, England
- Burial place: St Mary's Church, Brent Eleigh
- Education: Winchester College; Trinity College, Cambridge
- Spouse: Jane Lechmere Macaskie (m. 1944)

Sir David Haven Barran (23 May 1912 – 1 June 2002) was born in London, the youngest son of Sir John Barran, 2nd Baronet. He was an English oilman who was a senior executive with Shell. Barran served from 1967 to 1972 as the chairman of Shell Transport and Trading and from 1970 to 1972 as the chairman of the Royal Dutch/Shell Group.

== Shell Oil ==
He joined Shell after his graduation via its subsidiary the Asiatic Petroleum Company. He was posted in 1935 to Egypt and later to Sudan, Ethiopia, Libya, and the Middle East. At the beginning of World War II he wanted to enlist, but was told his greatest contribution would be to continue his work in the petroleum industry to ensure fuel for the British Eighth Army.

At the end of war Barran was posted to India, but returned to London in 1947. Through the 1950s he held positions in trade relations, marketing, and economics. In 1954 he negotiated a production agreement with the Venezuelan government, and in 1956 an agreement with the Kuwait government. In 1958 he became president of the Asiatic Petroleum Corporation in New York. Barran returned to London in 1961 and was elected a director of Shell Transport and Trading. In 1967 Barran was elected chairman of Shell Transport and Trading and by 1969 he was the highest paid person in the UK with a salary of £72,818. In 1970 he became chairman of the Committee of Managing Directors of the Royal Dutch/Shell Group. He was the first British (Shell) member to head the committee. Barran also held directorships with British Insulated Callender's Cables, British Leyland, British Steel, General Accident, and Glaxo. Following the death of Lord Armstrong of Sanderstead in 1980, Barran served as the chairman of the Midland Bank from 1980 until 1982. Barran retired as a director of Shell in 1983.

== Marriage and death ==
In 1944, Barran married Jane Macaskie. They had four sons and three daughters. He died in London on 1 June 2002.
