= Sir George Trevelyan, 2nd Baronet =

British statesman and author (1838–1928)

The Right Honourable Sir George Trevelyan Bt OM FBA
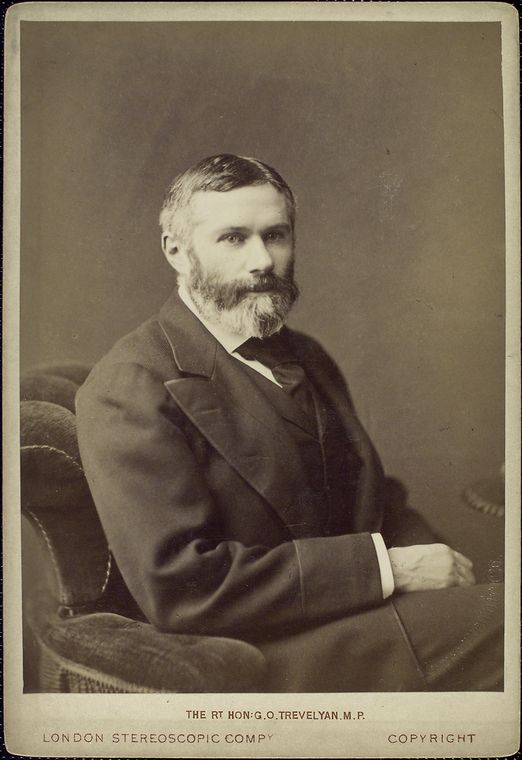
- Sir George Trevelyan, Bt

Chief Secretary for Ireland
- In office 9 May 1882 – 23 October 1884
- Monarch: Victoria
- Prime Minister: William Ewart Gladstone
- Preceded by: Lord Frederick Cavendish
- Succeeded by: Henry Campbell-Bannerman

Chancellor of the Duchy of Lancaster
- In office 29 October 1884 – 9 June 1885
- Monarch: Victoria
- Prime Minister: William Ewart Gladstone
- Preceded by: John George Dodson
- Succeeded by: Henry Chaplin

Secretary for Scotland
- In office 8 February 1886 – March 1886
- Monarch: Queen Victoria
- Prime Minister: William Ewart Gladstone
- Preceded by: The Duke of Richmond
- Succeeded by: The Earl of Dalhousie
- In office 18 August 1892 – 21 June 1895
- Monarch: Queen Victoria
- Prime Minister: William Ewart Gladstone; The Earl of Rosebery
- Preceded by: The Marquess of Lothian
- Succeeded by: The Lord Balfour of Burleigh

Personal details
- Born: 20 July 1838 Rothley Temple, Leicestershire
- Died: 17 August 1928 (aged 90) Wallington, Northumberland
- Party: Liberal
- Spouse: Caroline Philips
- Children: Charles; Robert; George
- Education: Trinity College, Cambridge

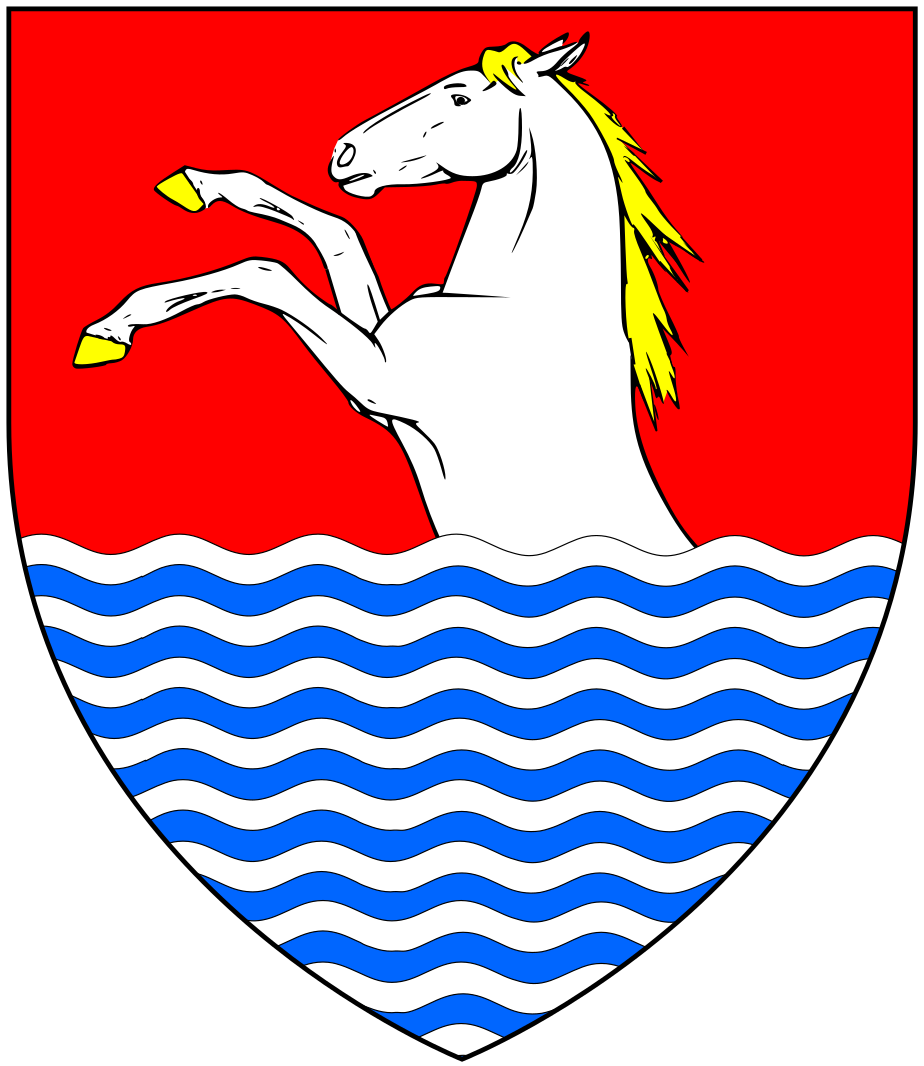
Arms of Trevelyan: Gules, a demi-horse argent hoofed and maned or issuing out of water in base proper

Sir George Otto Trevelyan, 2nd Baronet, OM, PC, FBA (20 July 1838 – 17 August 1928) was a British statesman and author. In a ministerial career stretching almost 30 years, he was most notably twice Secretary for Scotland under William Ewart Gladstone and the Earl of Rosebery. He broke with Gladstone over the 1886 Irish Home Rule Bill, but after modifications were made to the bill he re-joined the Liberal Party shortly afterwards. Also a writer and historian, Trevelyan wrote his novel The Competition Wallah in around 1864, and The Life and Letters of Lord Macaulay, his maternal uncle, in 1876.

== Background and education ==
Trevelyan was born in Rothley Temple, Leicestershire, the only son of Sir Charles Trevelyan, 1st Baronet, and Hannah, daughter of Zachary Macaulay and sister of the historian Lord Macaulay. He was educated at Harrow and Trinity College, Cambridge, where he was President of the Cambridge Union Society, and earned second place in the first class of the Classical Tripos in 1861. That same year he wrote his Horace at the University of Athens, a topical drama in verse, parts of which are said to have offended William Whewell and lost Trevelyan a fellowship. He was a Cambridge Apostle.

== Political career ==
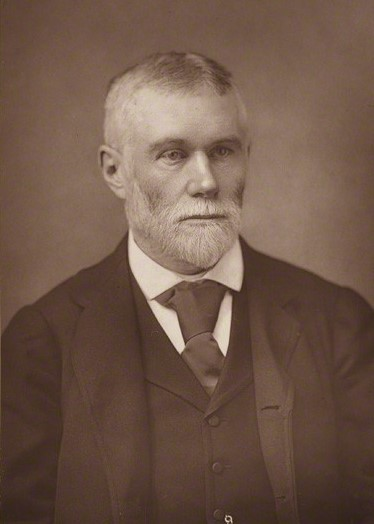
Sir George Trevelyan, 1893

In 1862 Trevelyan went out as a civil servant to India, where he spent several years. In 1865 he was elected Liberal Member of Parliament (MP) for Tynemouth and North Shields. At the general election of 1868 he was returned for the Hawick Burghs, which he continued to represent until 1886. When the first Gladstone ministry was formed in December 1868, Trevelyan was appointed Civil Lord of the Admiralty, but resigned in July 1870 on a point of conscience connected with the government Education Bill. He advocated a sweeping reform of the army, including the abolition of the purchase of commissions, and both in and out of parliament he was the foremost supporter for many years of the extension of the county franchise. In the session of 1874 he brought forward his Household Franchise (Counties) Bill, which was lost on the second reading – it was not till ten years later that the agricultural labourer was enfranchised. Among other causes which he warmly supported were women's suffrage, a thorough reform of metropolitan local government, and the drastic reform or abolition of the House of Lords. He was also in favour of the direct veto and other temperance legislation.

In 1880 Trevelyan was appointed Parliamentary Secretary to the Admiralty under Gladstone. He held this office until May 1882, when, after the assassination of Lord Frederick Cavendish, he became Chief Secretary for Ireland and sworn of the Privy Council. From November 1884 to June 1885 he was Chancellor of the Duchy of Lancaster with a seat in the cabinet. In February 1886 he became Secretary for Scotland and vice-president of the Scottish Education Department in Gladstone's third administration, but resigned in March over Irish Home Rule. The same year he succeeded his father in the baronetcy.

At the general election of 1886 Trevelyan lost his seat for Hawick. As one of the representatives of the Liberal Unionist Party he took part in the Round Table Conference with the official Liberal Party. Being satisfied with the changes made by Gladstone in his Home Rule scheme, Trevelyan formally rejoined the Liberal Party. In August 1887 he re-entered the House of Commons as member for Glasgow Bridgeton. From 1892 to 1895 he was again Secretary for Scotland and vice-president of the Scottish Education Department. He resigned his seat in parliament in early 1897 and retired into private life. He was elected to the American Philosophical Society in 1899. In 1911 he was appointed a member of the Order of Merit.

== Writings ==
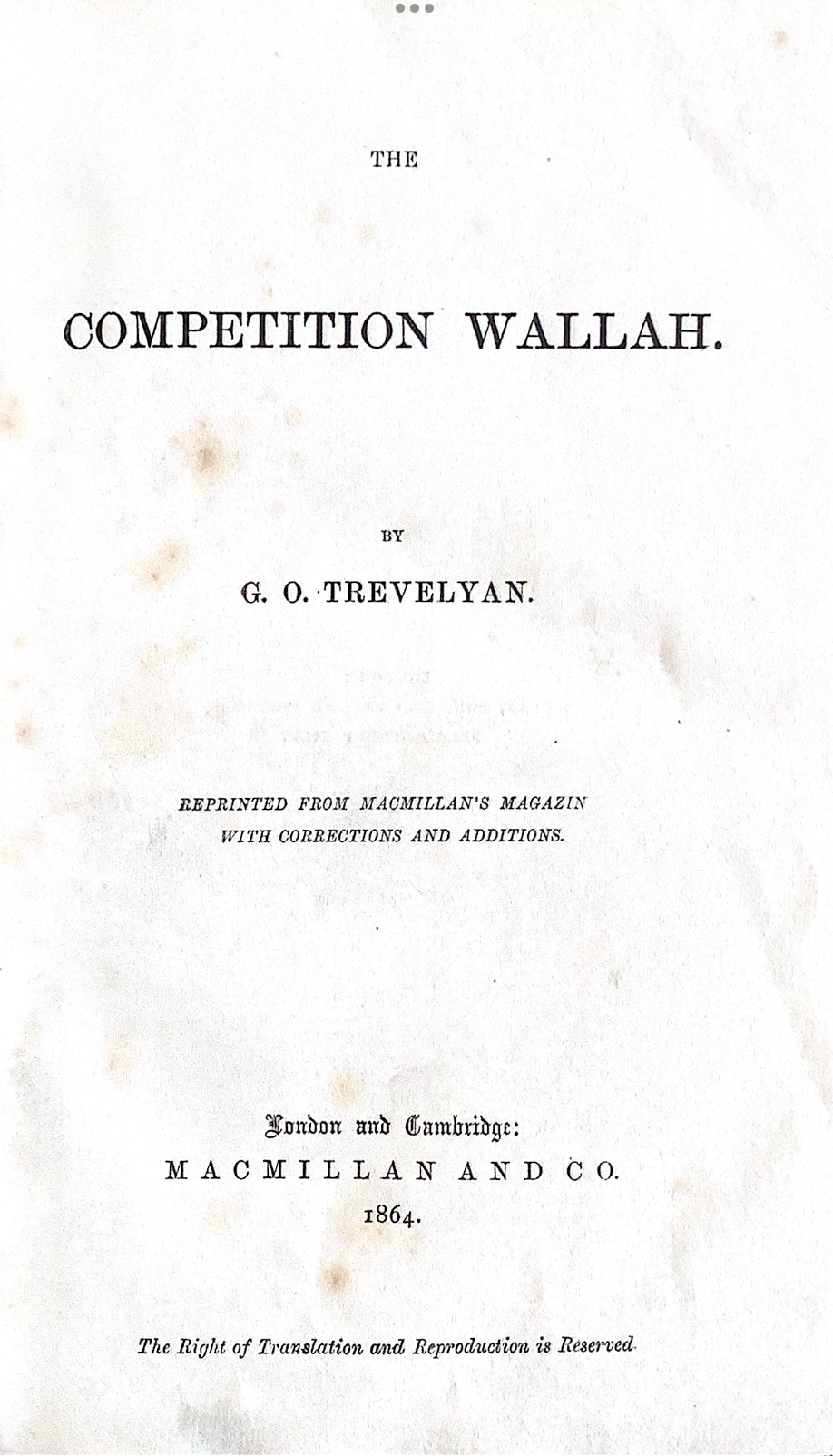
Competition Wallah, the title page from the 1864 Macmillan edition.

During his stay in India, Trevelyan contributed "Letters of a Competition Wallah" to Macmillan's Magazine (republished 1864). Cawnpore, an account of the massacre there during the Indian Rebellion of 1857, was published in 1865. In 1867 he wrote The Ladies in Parliament, a humorous political brochure in verse. In 1876 he published The Life and Letters of Lord Macaulay (a second, enlarged edition appeared in 1908), and in 1880 he published The Early History of Charles James Fox. In 1899 he published the first volume of a History of the American Revolution, which was completed (three volumes) in 1905. In the latter year, as Interludes in Prose and Verse, he republished his early classical "jeux d'esprit" and Indian pieces. He published two volumes of his work George III and Charles Fox in 1912 and 1914.

== Family ==
Trevelyan married Caroline, daughter of Robert Needham Philips, MP for Bury, in 1869. Their eldest son, Sir Charles Trevelyan, 3rd Baronet, also became a Liberal, and subsequently Labour, politician. Their second son R. C. Trevelyan was a poet and translator. The historian G. M. Trevelyan was their third son. Trevelyan died in August 1928, aged 90. He left unsettled property valued at £556,993 (gross) and £397,492 (net).

== Works ==
- Treveleyan, Sir George (1886). Cawnpore. Macmillan and Co.

== Notes and references ==
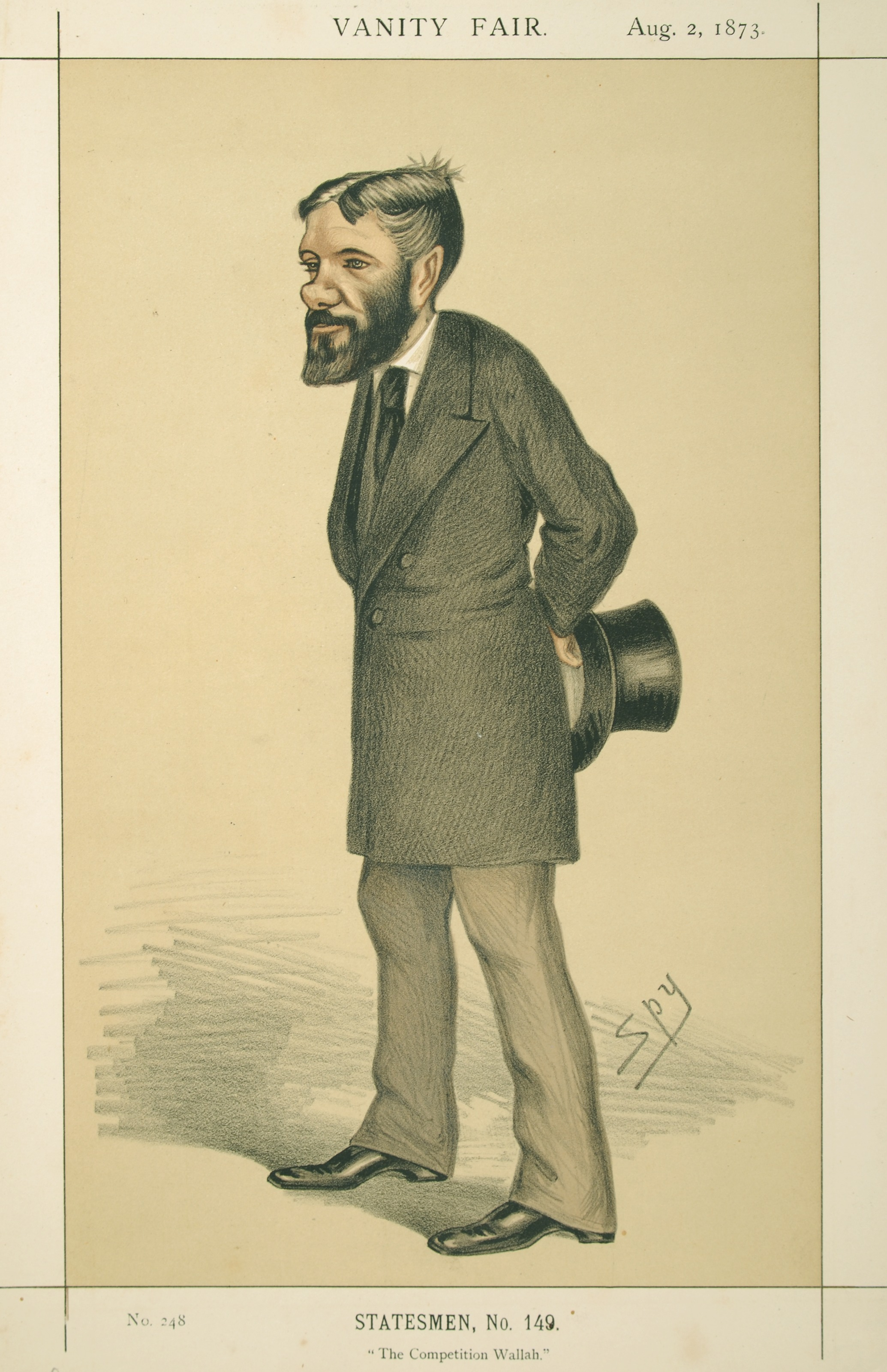
"The Competition Wallah". Caricature by Spy published in Vanity Fair in 1873.

- Torrance, David, The Scottish Secretaries (Birlinn 2006)

Parliament of the United Kingdom
Preceded by Richard Hodgson	Member of Parliament for Tynemouth and North Shields; 1865–1868	Succeeded by Thomas Eustace Smith
New constituency	Member of Parliament for Hawick Burghs; 1868–1886	Succeeded by Alexander Laing Brown
Preceded by Sir Edward Russell	Member of Parliament for Glasgow Bridgeton; 1887–1897	Succeeded by Sir Charles Cameron
Political offices
Preceded by Hon. Frederick Stanley	Civil Lord of the Admiralty; 1868–1870	Succeeded by The Earl of Camperdown
Preceded by George Shaw-Lefevre	Parliamentary Secretary to the Admiralty; 1880–1882	Succeeded by Henry Campbell-Bannerman
Preceded by Lord Frederick Cavendish	Chief Secretary for Ireland; 1882–1884	Succeeded by Henry Campbell-Bannerman
Preceded by John George Dodson	Chancellor of the Duchy of Lancaster; 1884–1885	Succeeded by Henry Chaplin
Preceded by The Duke of Richmond	Secretary for Scotland; 1886	Succeeded by The Earl of Dalhousie
Preceded by The Marquess of Lothian	Secretary for Scotland; 1892–1895	Succeeded by The Lord Balfour of Burleigh
Baronetage of the United Kingdom
Preceded by Charles Trevelyan	Baronet (of Wallington); 1886–1928	Succeeded by Charles Trevelyan
