= Deosai Mountains =

Mountain range in the Himalayas

Coordinates: 35°14′N 75°13′E

The Deosai Mountains are a mountain range in the Himalayas. They lie to the southeast of the Indus Gorge in northern Pakistan, extending for 120 mi (190 km) from near Bunji to the Suru River across the western border of Ladakh, and adjoin the Zanskar Range. The district of Kargil lies at the junction of the Deosai and the Greater Himalayan Range. To the east of the Deosai Mountains is the highland plateau of the Deosai Plains; although the two names are sometimes conflated. The runoff from the southern slopes of the Deosai Mountains forms a tributary that joins the Shiugo River, which then merges with the Dras River.

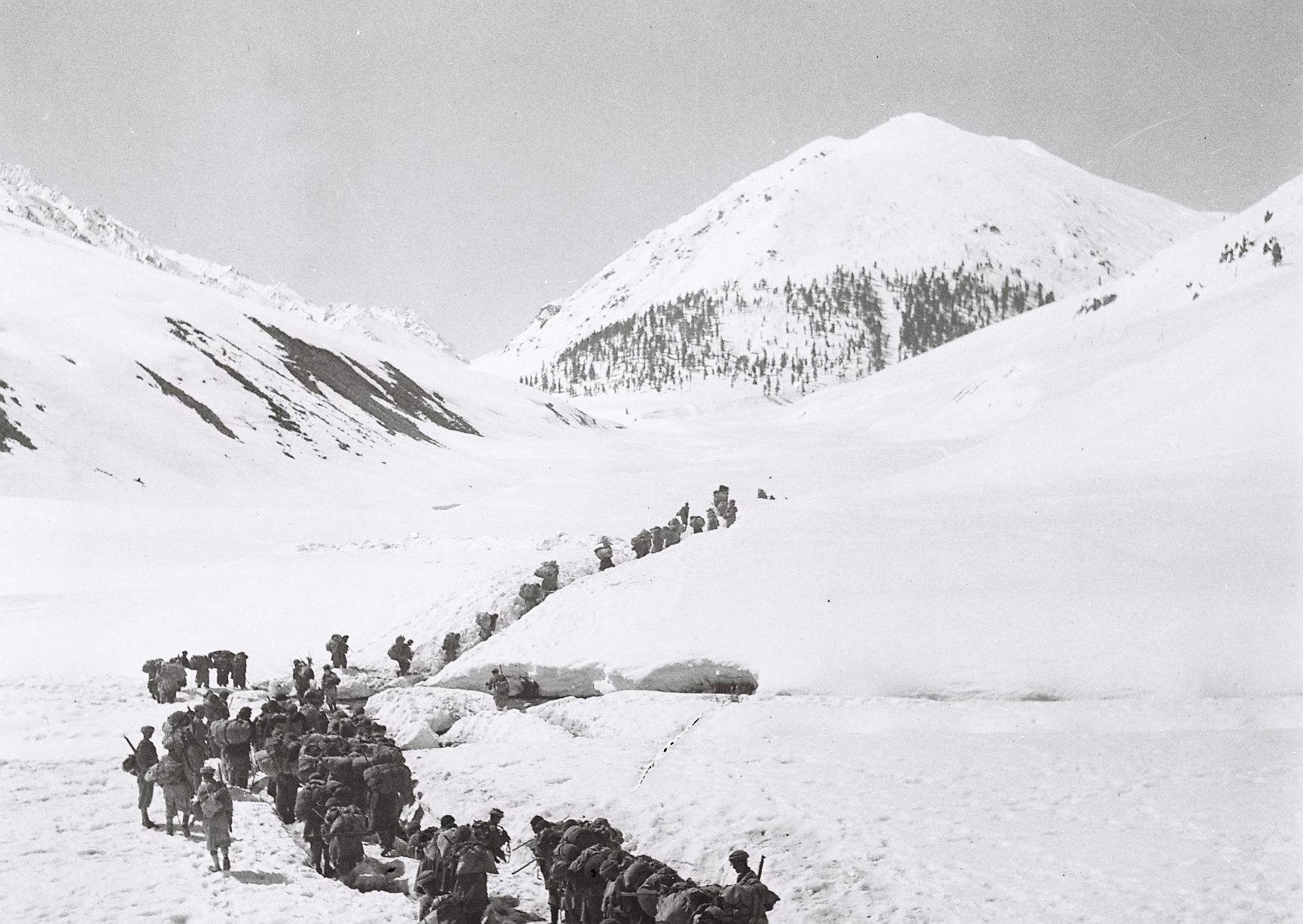
Gilgit Scouts crossing the Deosai Mountains during the First Kashmir War in November 1947

Deosai Mountains mainly consist of Precambrian sedimentary rock and the relatively younger granite stone. Several peaks reach an elevation of 18,000 ft or 5,500 m; they surround Deosai Plains which average 13,000 ft or 4,000 m in elevation and have no permanent human population. The Burji La Pass in the range opens towards southwest of Skardu.

== Gallery ==
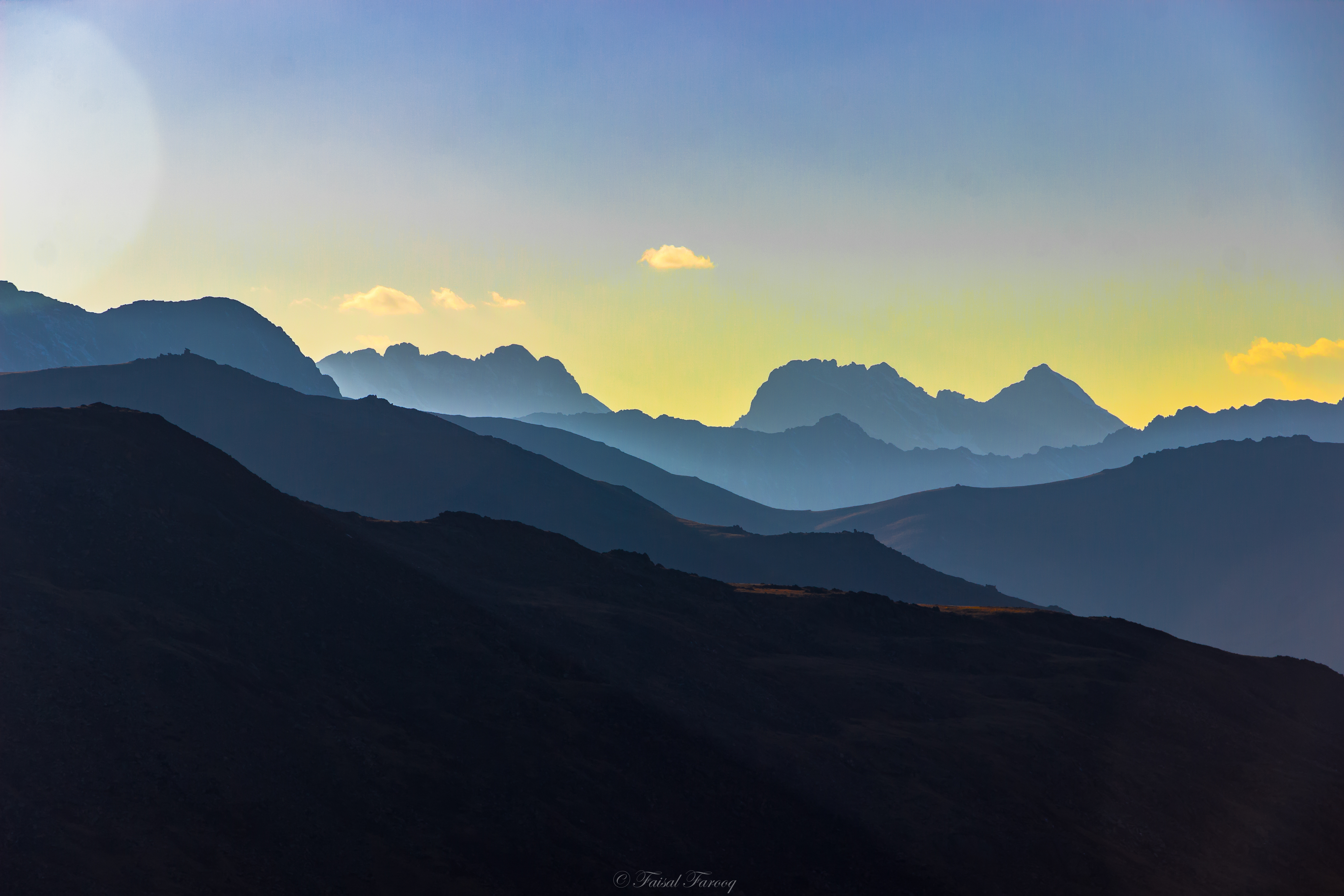
Deosai Mountains

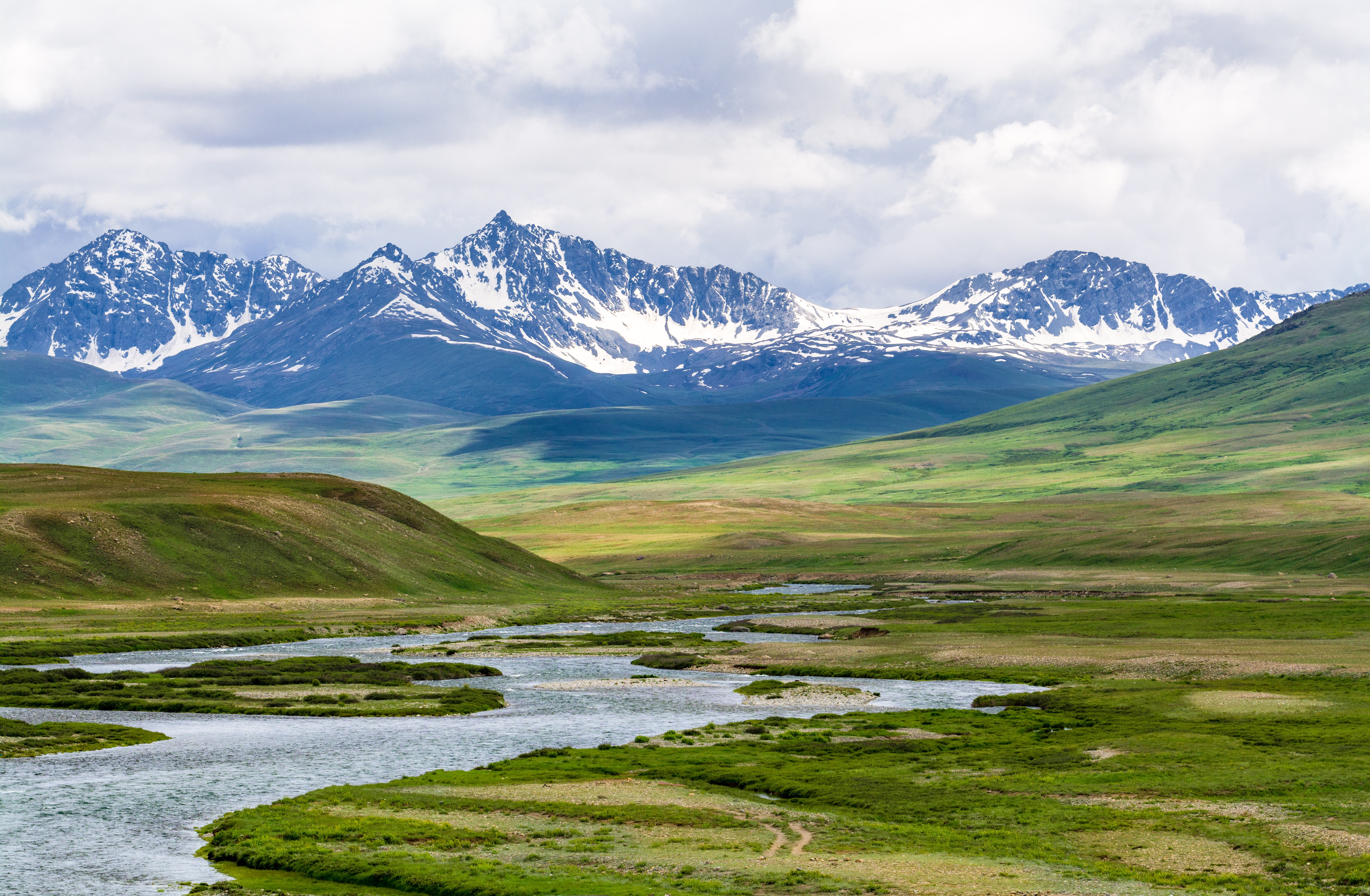
Deosai Mountains during summer

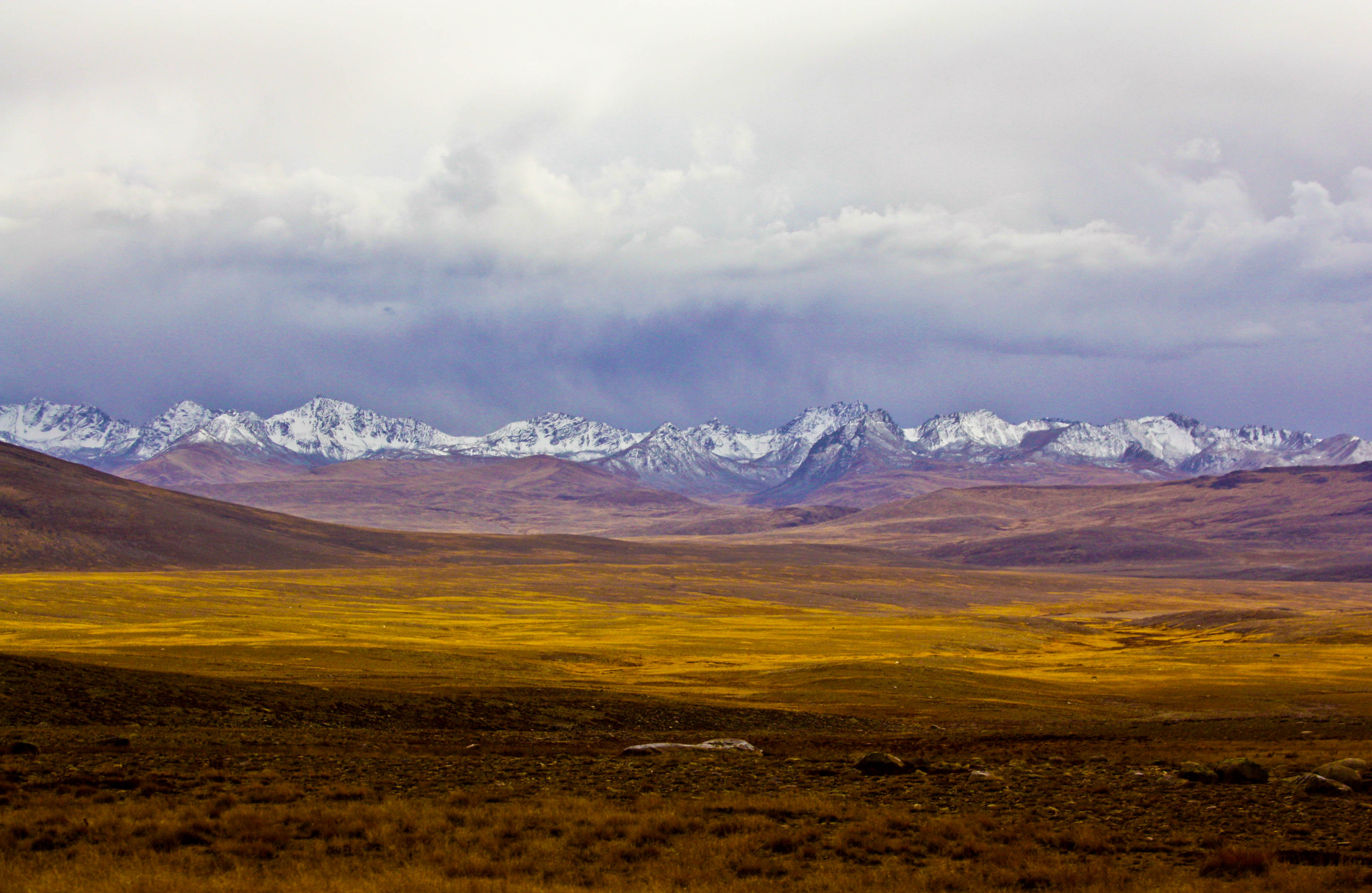
Deosai Mountains during autumn

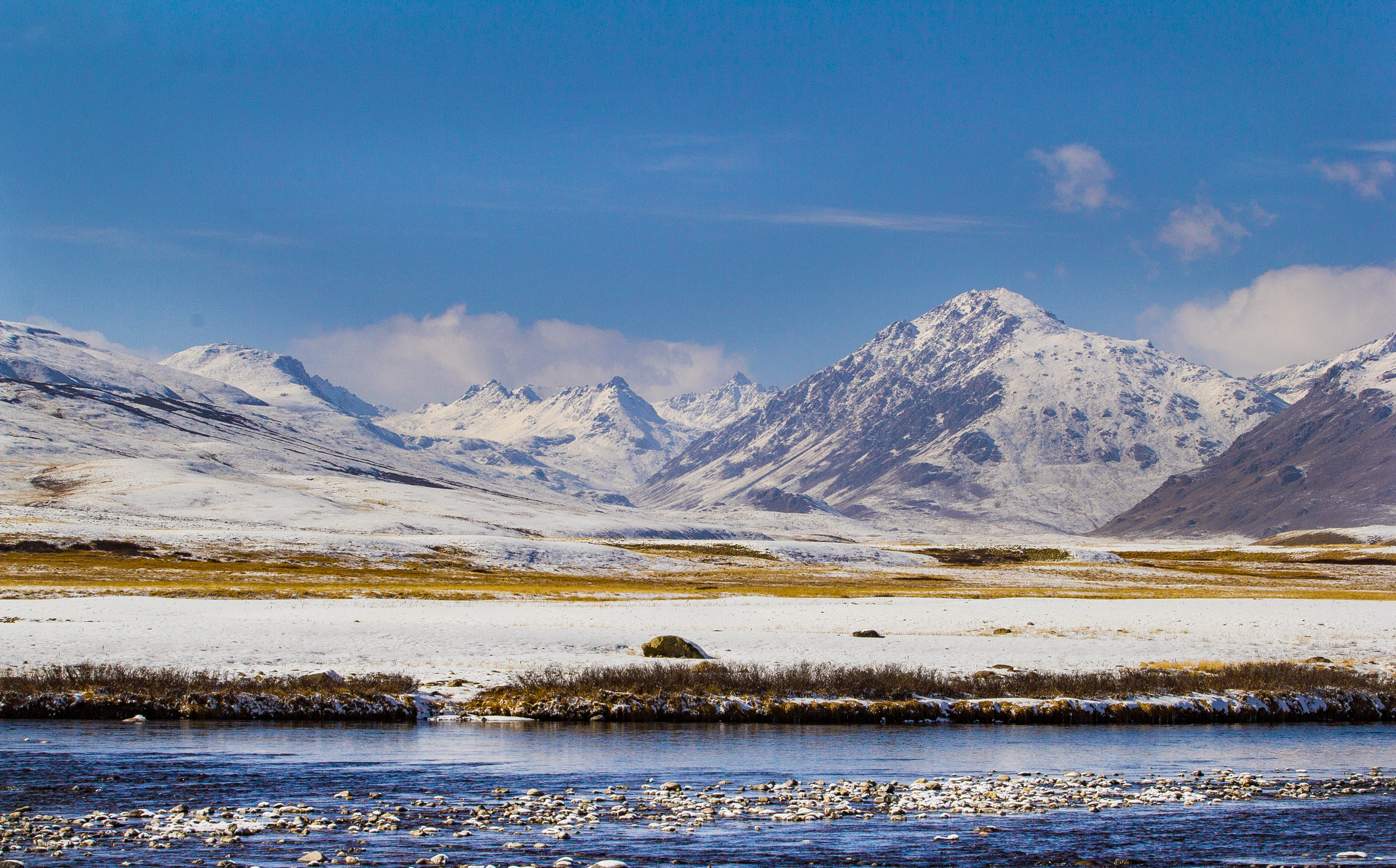
Deosai Mountains during winter
