= Hawick Burghs =

Parliamentary constituency in the United Kingdom, 1868–1918

- Former district of burghs constituency for the House of Commons
- Subdivisions of Scotland: Roxburghshire and Selkirkshire
- Major settlements: Hawick, Galashiels, and Selkirk

1868–1918
- Seats: One
- Created from: Roxburghshire; Selkirkshire
- Replaced by: Roxburgh and Selkirk

Hawick Burghs was a district of burghs constituency of the House of Commons of the Parliament of the United Kingdom from 1868 until 1918. It consisted of the Roxburghshire burgh of Hawick and the Selkirkshire burghs of Galashiels and Selkirk.

== Members of Parliament ==
Election	Member	Party	Notes
1868	George Trevelyan	Liberal	
1886	George Trevelyan	Liberal Unionist	
1886	Alexander Laing Brown	Liberal	
1892	Thomas Shaw	Liberal	later Baron Craigmyle
1909 by-election	Sir John Barran	Liberal	
1918	constituency abolished		

== Election results ==
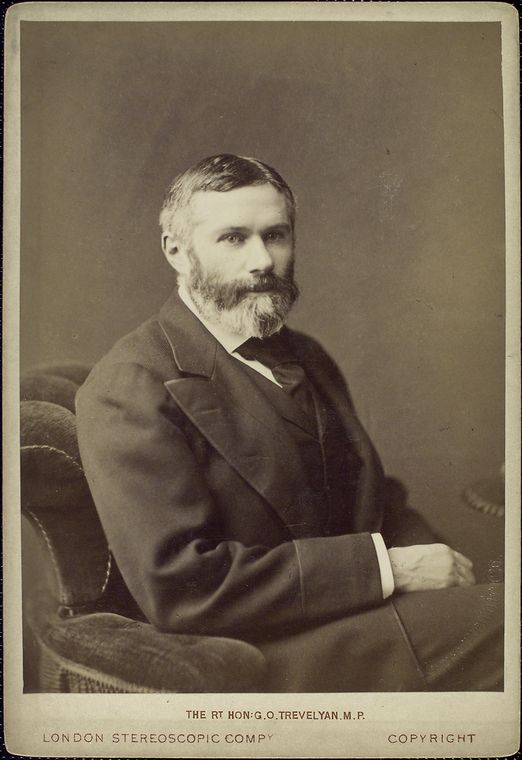
Trevelyan

George Otto Trevelyan was returned without opposition at the 1868 general election and again after acceptance of office at a by-election on 14 January 1869.

=== Elections in the 1860s ===
General election 1868: Hawick Burghs
Party	Candidate	Votes	%	±%
Liberal	George Trevelyan	Unopposed		
Registered electors		3,335		
Liberal win (new seat)				

Trevelyan was appointed Civil Lord of the Admiralty.

By-election, 4 Jan 1869: Hawick Burghs
Party	Candidate	Votes	%	±%
Liberal	George Trevelyan	Unopposed		
Liberal hold				

=== Elections in the 1870s ===
General election 1874: Hawick Burghs
Party	Candidate	Votes	%	±%
Liberal	George Trevelyan	Unopposed		
Registered electors		3,729		
Liberal hold				

=== Elections in the 1880s ===
General election 1880: Hawick Burghs
Party	Candidate	Votes	%	±%
Liberal	George Trevelyan	3,518	86.4	N/A
Conservative	James Thomas Spencer Elliot	553	13.6	New
Majority		2,965	72.8	N/A
Turnout		4,071	82.7	N/A
Registered electors		4,920		
Liberal hold		Swing	N/A	

Trevelyan was appointed Chief Secretary to the Lord Lieutenant of Ireland, requiring a by-election.

By-election, 18 May 1882: Hawick Burghs
Party	Candidate	Votes	%	±%
Liberal	George Trevelyan	Unopposed		
Liberal hold				

General election 1885: Hawick Burghs
Party	Candidate	Votes	%	±%
Liberal	George Trevelyan	Unopposed		
Liberal hold				

Trevelyan was appointed Secretary for Scotland, requiring a by-election.

By-election, 10 Feb 1886: Hawick Burghs
Party	Candidate	Votes	%	±%
Liberal	George Trevelyan	Unopposed		
Liberal hold				

General election 1886: Hawick Burghs
Party	Candidate	Votes	%	±%
Liberal	Alexander Laing Brown	2,523	50.3	N/A
Liberal Unionist	George Trevelyan	2,493	49.7	New
Majority		30	0.6	N/A
Turnout		5,016	88.3	N/A
Registered electors		5,679		
Liberal hold		Swing	N/A	

=== Elections in the 1890s ===
Shaw

General election 1892: Hawick Burghs
Party	Candidate	Votes	%	±%
Liberal	Thomas Shaw	3,004	53.2	+2.9
Liberal Unionist	Robert Fraser Watson	2,639	46.8	−2.9
Majority		365	6.4	+5.8
Turnout		5,643	89.7	+1.4
Registered electors		6,291		
Liberal hold		Swing	+2.9	

Shaw was appointed Solicitor General for Scotland, requiring a by-election.

1894 Hawick Burghs by-election
Party	Candidate	Votes	%	±%
Liberal	Thomas Shaw	3,203	55.6	+2.4
Liberal Unionist	Ralph Wardlaw McLeod Fullarton	2,556	44.4	−2.4
Majority		647	11.2	+4.8
Turnout		5,759	91.4	+1.7
Registered electors		6,302		
Liberal hold		Swing	+2.4	

General election 1895: Hawick Burghs
Party	Candidate	Votes	%	±%
Liberal	Thomas Shaw	3,033	54.5	+1.3
Liberal Unionist	John Sanderson	2,531	45.5	−1.3
Majority		502	9.0	+2.6
Turnout		5,564	87.5	−2.2
Registered electors		6,357		
Liberal hold		Swing	+1.3	

=== Elections in the 1900s ===
Shaw

General election 1900: Hawick Burghs
Party	Candidate	Votes	%	±%
Liberal	Thomas Shaw	2,611	52.3	−2.2
Liberal Unionist	John Sanderson	2,386	47.7	+2.2
Majority		225	4.6	−4.4
Turnout		4,997	85.1	−2.4
Registered electors		5,869		
Liberal hold		Swing	−2.2	

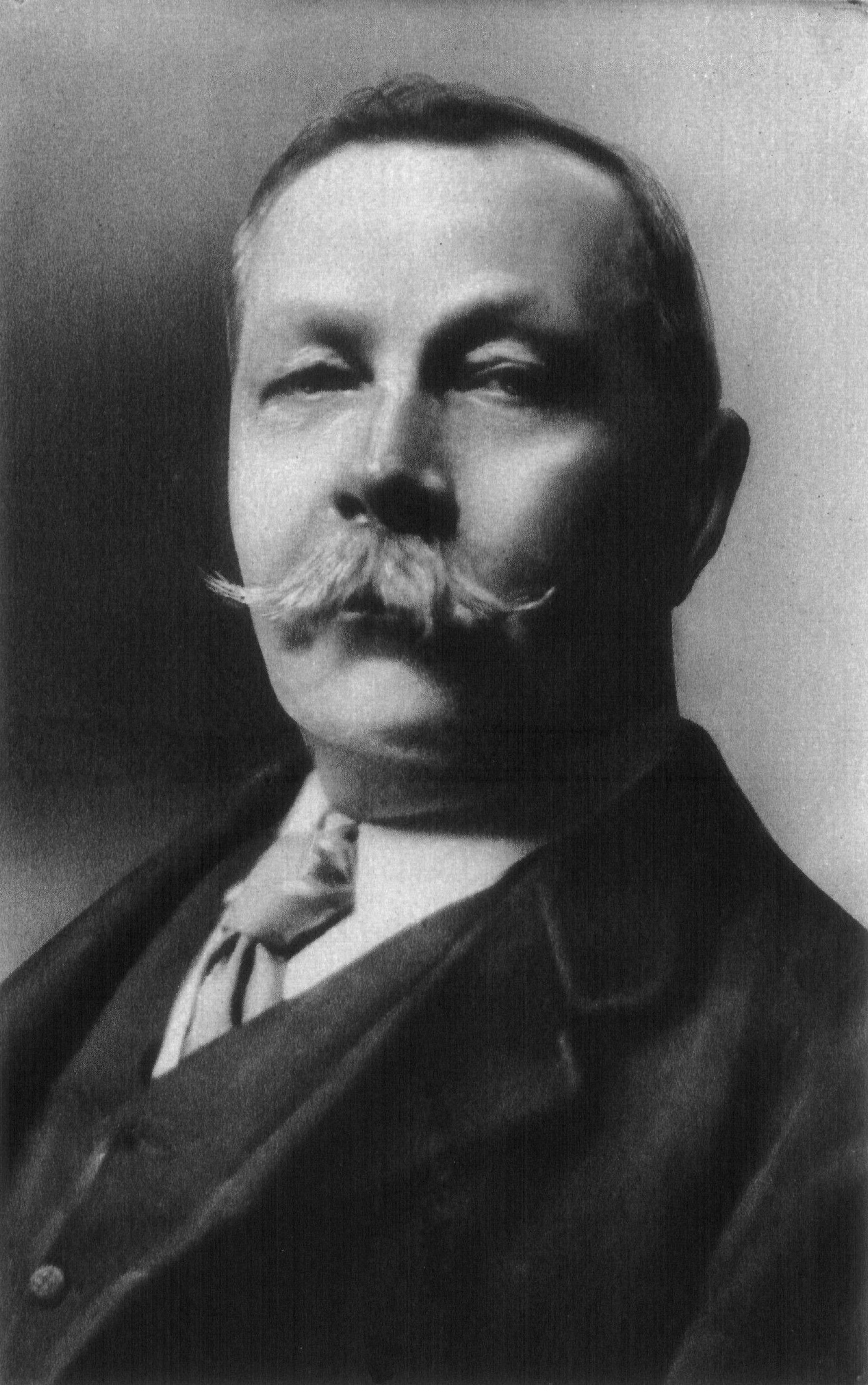
Conan Doyle

General election 1906: Hawick Burghs
Party	Candidate	Votes	%	±%
Liberal	Thomas Shaw	3,125	56.1	+3.8
Liberal Unionist	Arthur Conan Doyle	2,444	43.9	−3.8
Majority		681	12.2	+7.6
Turnout		5,569	92.0	+6.9
Registered electors		6,053		
Liberal hold		Swing	+3.8	

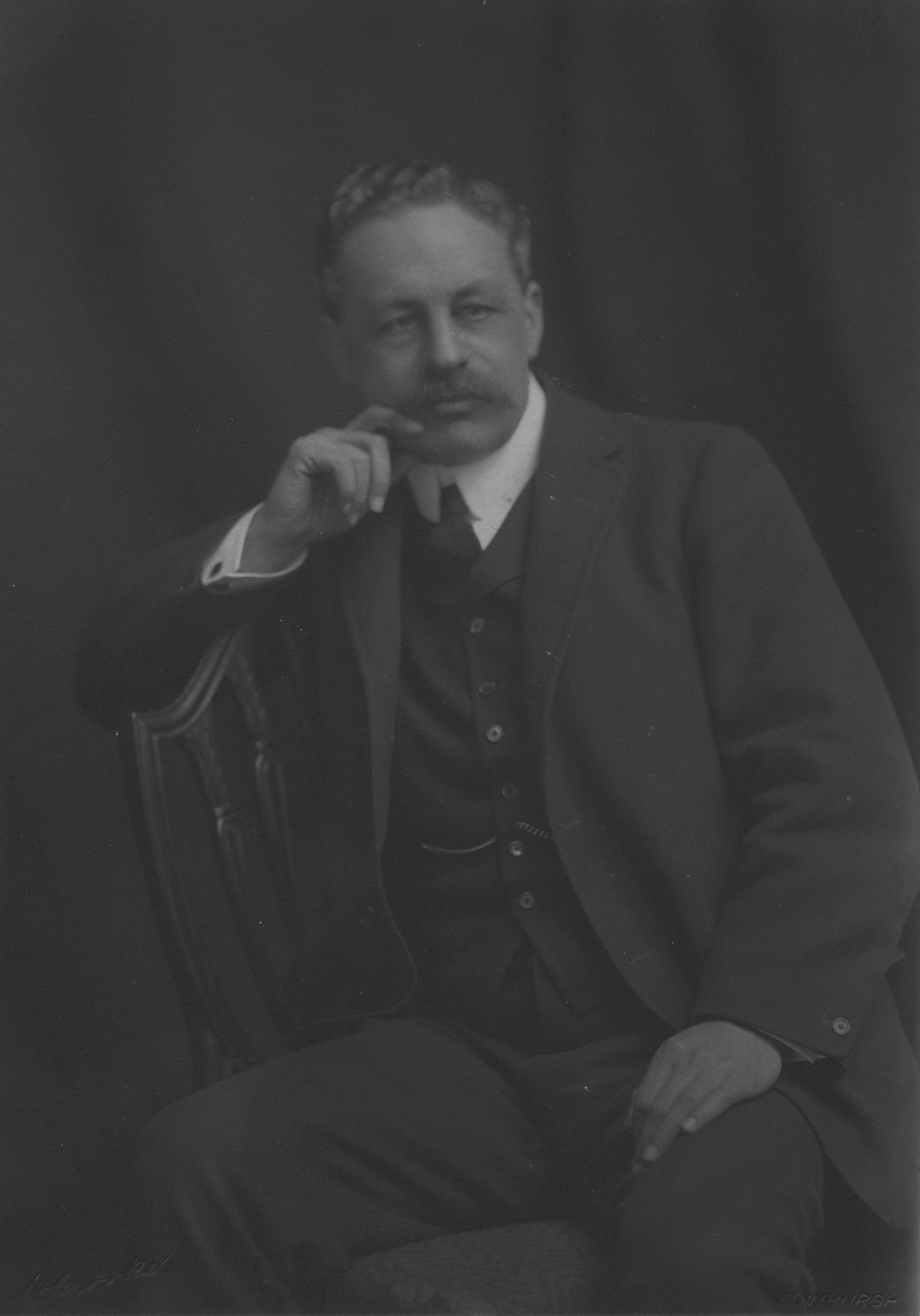
Mackinder

1909 Hawick Burghs by-election
Party	Candidate	Votes	%	±%
Liberal	John Barran	3,028	54.7	−1.4
Liberal Unionist	Halford Mackinder	2,508	45.3	+1.4
Majority		520	9.4	−2.8
Turnout		5,536	92.8	+0.8
Registered electors		5,968		
Liberal hold		Swing	−1.4	

=== Elections in the 1910s ===
Barran

General election January 1910: Hawick Burghs
Party	Candidate	Votes	%	±%
Liberal	John Barran	3,261	59.0	+4.3
Liberal Unionist	James Graham (Scottish politician)	2,268	41.0	−4.3
Majority		993	18.0	+8.6
Turnout		5,529	91.7	−1.1
Liberal hold		Swing	+4.3	

General election December 1910: Hawick Burghs
Party	Candidate	Votes	%	±%
Liberal	John Barran	Unopposed		
Liberal hold				

General Election 1914–15:

Another General Election was required to take place before the end of 1915. The political parties had been making preparations for an election to take place and by July 1914, the following candidates had been selected;

- Liberal: John Barran
- Unionist: Norman W. Grieve
