= Nasir ul-Mulk =

Eldest son of Mehtar Shuja ul-Mulk

Sir Nasir ul-Mulk KCIE
- The Mehtar of Chitral
- Tenure: 1936–1943
- Predecessor: Mehtar Shuja ul-Mulk
- Successor: Mehtar Muzaffar ul-Mulk
- Other titles: His Highness; K.C.I.E; Hon. Cdt. Chitral Scouts; Cdt. Chitral State Bodyguards
- Born: 1897; Chitral, Princely state, British India
- Died: 1943 (aged 45–46)
- Buried: Chitral
- Residence: The Royal Fort at Chitral
- Wars and battles: Third Anglo-Afghan War
- Noble family: Katoor Dynasty

His Highness Sir Nasir ul-Mulk KCIE (29 September 1897 – 29 July 1943) was the eldest son of Mehtar Shuja ul-Mulk, who succeeded him in 1936. He ruled the princely state of Chitral from 1936 to 1943.

== Early life and education ==
Nasir ul-Mulk was born in the royal fort at Chitral on 29 September 1897. He was the eldest son of Mehtar Shuja ul-Mulk. He spent his early days in the Chitral fort under the tutelage of several teachers who trained him in Persian, Urdu, English and Arabic. In 1916 he enrolled in Islamia College Peshawar, from where he did his Matriculation. He later completed his Bachelor of Arts with a distinction, earning first position in the North West Frontier Province. For the feat he received the Chelmsford Gold Medal. Starting from a young age Nasir was education oriented and had advanced political ideas.

== Third Anglo-Afghan War (1919) ==
As the Third Anglo-Afghan War unfolded, the southern borders of Chitral were attacked. The Chitral Scouts and Bodyguards with Nasir ul-Mulk as Colonel Commandant (Col. Cdt) fought off the advancing army. He personally lead a force of over a thousand men up the valley of Urtsun, over a pass with the intention of surprising the Afghan forces and cutting them off. To the credit of the young prince, the Chitral forces along with the Kurram Militia were the only legions fighting along the Durand Line which did not disband or disburse during the conflict. The success of the campaign brought Nasir a good name in British circles with Shuja ul-Mulk being rewarded reverently for the war efforts.

== Life as crown prince ==
When Shuja ul-Mulk went for pilgrimage to Mecca (1923–1924), Nasir ul-Mulk acted as Regent and administered the affairs of the state. Upon his father's return he became Governor of Mastuj, which post he retained till his accession. On 10 September 1924 he was commissioned as Honorary Lieutenant in the British Indian Army and was attached to the 6th Royal Battalion Frontier Force Regiment. He was later attached to the 13th Frontier Force Rifles (1926–1927). In 1932 he was elected as a life member of the Royal Society for Asian Affairs. On 1 January 1934 he was promoted as Honorary Captain of in the British Indian Army. During this period he was also inducted into the Indian Civil Service (ICS) as an Assistant Commissioner. A career that he seriously contemplated pursuing before circumstances obliged him to forgo the option.

== Accession to the throne ==
On 13 October 1936 Sir Shuja ul-Mulk died suddenly in Chitral of heart failure. Nasir ul-Mulk being the eldest son, succeeded him and was proclaimed Mehtar with full powers at a durbar attended by the Political Agent Malakand Major Johnson on 19 October 1936. Shuja ul-Mulk had died leaving a comparatively stable atmosphere for his successor. Upon becoming the ruler of Chitral he automatically acquired the title of His Highness (which was then hereditary). However the honorific title of Sir would be bestowed several years later when he was Knighted.

== Reign (1936–1943) ==
Nasir ul-Mulk ruled for about seven years, in which he proved to be an enlightened chief. He immediately set up the first school in Chitral in 1937.

In 1939, he proceeded on a pilgrimage to Saudi Arabia. On the way there he met Sir Sultan Muhammad Shah Aga Khan III at Bombay. Upon completion of Hajj and while returning, he visited the State of Hyderabad and was received with official protocol by Sir Muhammad Akbar Nazar Ali Hydari the Prime Minister of Hyderabad. He also met the Nizam of Hyderabad before returning to Chitral.

Soon after his return to Chitral, news broke out of World War II starting in Europe. In India, the Viceroys War Purpose Fund was being collected, into which the Mehtar made a donation of 30,000 Indian Rupees. The Governor of the North West Frontier Province welcomed the initiative. Nasir was promoted as Hon Major in the British Indian Army in 1940.

In October 1940, the governor of NWFP Sir George Cunningham accompanied by the Political Agent for Malakand visited Chitral. Massive celebrations were held in their honor. At the conclusion of their visit two demands were placed before the Governor by Nasir ul-Mulk.

1. The area of Yasin and Ghizer which were part of Chitral at the time of Aman ul-Mulk were taken away by the British in 1895. These areas, it was pleaded, should be returned to Chitral.
2. All outside forces serving in the defense of Chitral should be replaced by local recruits.

Sir George assured the Mehtar that both demands would be considered and eventually the second was accepted.

Nasir was made a Knight Commander of the Indian Empire (KCIE) on 1 January 1941. In February the same year, he traveled to Delhi and met the Viceroy Victor Hope, the Marquess of Linlithgow. He also met leaders of the All-India Muslim League and Indian National Congress including Muhammad Ali Jinnah, Mohandas Gandhi, Sir Zafarullah Khan, Sir Shah Muhammad Sulaiman and Maulana Abul Kalam Azad.

On 1 January 1943, he was promoted to the rank of Honorary Colonel in the British Indian Army. Until then, Nasir had also served as Honorary Colonel Commandant of the Chitral State Scouts (1936–1943).

He had no sons but left behind two daughters, one of whom would marry Nawab Bahadur Mohammad Saeed Khan of Amb and the other her cousin, Saif-ur-Rahman later Mehtar of Chitral.

== Literary pursuits ==
Nasir ul-Mulk was a scholar of Persian literature and published several volumes of poetry and prose, he was a close associate of several prominent literary figures of British India, including Sir Mohammad Iqbal. Perhaps his most accomplished work is a Persian treatise on Darwinism in the light of the Quran, Sunnah and Sufi mysticism.

The Tarikh-i-Chitral written in Persian by Mirza Muhammad Ghufran was revised and enlarged as the Nayi Tarikh-i-Chitral with the additional research of Nasir ul-Mulk by Mirza Ghulam Murtaza. Nasir is believed to have taken a personal and keen interest in the expansion of the text.

== Death ==
Nasir ul-Mulk, died in 1943 without leaving a male heir. He had reigned for seven years and was succeeded by his brother, Muzaffar ul-Mulk.

== Disambiguation ==
Sir Nasir ul-Mulk is not to be confused with Justice Nasir-ul-Mulk the 22nd Chief Justice of Pakistan. The latter's father Kamran Khan, was a wealthy and respectable businessman from Swat who had his business branches throughout N.W.F.P including the State of Chitral. Kamran Khan, upon learning about the royal family of Chitral is believed to have developed a liking for the surname ul-Mulk and named his sons Shuja-ul-Mulk, Nasir-ul-Mulk and Rafil-ul-Mulk (the first two being after Chitral's ex-rulers). There is no lineal connecting between the families or Sir Nasir ul-Mulk and Justice Nasir-ul-Mulk for that matter.
