= Mata ul-Mulk =

Colonel Mata ul-Mulk (Urdu: مطاع اُلملک; 10 February 1918 – 8 February 2002) was a member of the Kator dynasty of Chitral. He played an important role in leading campaigns in Baltistan during the First Kashmir War, most notably in the siege and capture of Skardu on 14 August 1948, for which he is also known as Fatih-i-Skardu (lit. Conqueror of Skardu).

== Early life and education ==
Mata ul-Mulk was a son of Shuja ul-Mulk, the ruler of Chitral from 1895 until 1936. He was born on 10 February 1918 in Chitral, and got his education from Prince of Wales Royal Indian Military College, Dehradun.

== Military career ==
=== Second World War ===
Commissioned as 2nd Lieutenant on 15 July 1938, Mata ul-Mulk got promotion as Lieutenant on 28 November 1940. He served as captain in World War II at Malaya and Singapore. Captured by the Japanese on 20 June 1941, he joined the Subhas Chandra Bose-led Indian National Army and got commissioned in it as the Reinforcement Commandant on 15 February 1943. After the Surrender of Japan, he was made Prisoner of War but was eventually released, later heading the Chitral Body Guard Force in 1946 as Colonel.

=== First Indo-Pakistani War ===
Chitral was a comparatively small princely state situated to the northwest of Kashmir. The rulers of Chitral had a keen interest in the Gilgit region under the nominal overlordship of the Maharaja of Kashmir, as parts of it (Ishkoman, Yasin, and Phander in present-day Ghizer District) had been part of Chitral until 1895, over which Chitral had claims. After the accession of Maharaja to India on 26 October 1947 and the revolt of Gilgit Scouts on November 1st, the Mehtar of Chitral Muzaffar ul-Mulk was quick to send Chitral Scouts and Chitral Bodyguard under his brothers Burhan ud-Din and Mata ul-Mulk to prevent these areas from falling under Indian control.

In June 1948 Mata ul-Mulk arrived at Skardu with a contingent of Chitral Bodyguard. He took charge after Babar Khan was sent to Ladakh on 12 June. His arrival was instrumental in turning the tide of war as he brought with him four pieces of mountain howitzers, hauled through mules over the Shandur Pass and Deosai Plains to Baltistan. On 17 June Mata ul-Mulk communicated following message to Col. Sher Jung Thapa, the Indian commander of the besieged garrison, through a captured Indian prisoner of war:

You have done your duty as every soldier should do. Now that it is clear that no relief can reach you in this mountainous area there is no doubt about it. It is of no use to carry on a struggle which will result in your total annihilation. I therefore advise you to lay down arms and I take full responsibility to give protection to one and all. You must trust me and believe me as I am not only a soldier but also possess royal blood. I have given instructions to my officers and men that any one approaching with a white flag will not be fired at but taken into safe custody. Lastly as a proof of my goodwill I wish to inform you that not a single Sikh or Hindu resident of Chitral has been hurt and not a single non-Muslim property looted or damaged and up till now they carry on their business as if nothing at all has happened. I therefore advise you again to lay down arms and thus save your lives. An Officer should accompany back the white flag if you consider my words sincere and honest.

Thapa however treated the prince's message with contempt and refused. From 19 June till the end the Indian garrison had the continuous support of the Royal Indian Air Force. By mid-August 1948, the Indian garrison was in beggarly shape and the Kashmir forces began to leave the fort in small batches on the night of 13 August 1948. On 14 August 1948 and with the last box of the reserve ammunition used, the garrison capitulated to Col. Mata ul-Mulk. All the remaining men were reportedly killed, except for Col. Thapa and his Sikh orderly. Col. Thapa, who had earned his respect from Mata ul-Mulk due to his last stand, was released a few weeks later, and was awarded Maha Vir Chakra by the Indian government.

== Later life and death ==
Mata ul-Mulk was arrested and imprisoned in Peshawar during 1948–1950 by the Pakistani government for acting independently during the war. He lived the rest of his life in his ancestral fort at Shoghore near Garam Chashma, and died on 8 February 2002.
