= Shuja ul-Mulk =

Mehtar of Chitral

Sir Shuja ul-Mulk, KCIE
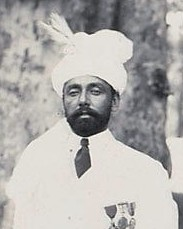

Mehtar of Chitral
- Reign: 2 March 1895 – 13 October 1936
- Predecessor: Amir ul-Mulk
- Successor: Nasir ul-Mulk
- Born: 1881; Chitral
- Died: 1936 (aged 54–55)
- Burial: Shahi Mosque Chitral
- Issue: Nasir ul-Mulk; Muzaffar ul-Mulk; Burhan-ud-Din; Mata ul-Mulk; Khushwaqt ul-Mulk; Khush Ahmad ul-Mulk
- House: Kator
- Father: Aman ul-Mulk

His Highness Sir Shuja ul-Mulk KCIE (1 January 1881 – 13 October 1936) was the ruler (from Persian: مهتر) of the State of Chitral, and reigned it for 41 years until his death in 1936. He belonged to the royal Katur dynasty, which ruled the state from 1571 to 1969, until the Princely State of Chitral was merged to form the Chitral District of the Provincially Administered Tribal Areas, Malakand Division, North West Frontier Province, Pakistan.

His rule saw the State of Chitral experience an extensive period of unwonted peace. He introduced widespread and far-reaching changes and administrative reforms. Shuja ul-Mulk rendered important services to the British Empire during the Third Anglo-Afghan War. He was invested as a Companion of the Most Eminent Order of the Indian Empire (CIE) by the British in 1903, and Knight Commander of the Most Eminent Order of the Indian Empire (KCIE) in 1919. He was granted a personal gun salute of 11 guns, and the title of His Highness.

== Early life ==
Mehtar Shuja ul-Mulk was born into the ruling family of Chitral in 1881. He was the second youngest son of Aman ul-Mulk, the ‘Great’ Mehtar of Chitral, who ruled the state from 1857 to 1892, during which the state reached its territorial peak. Shuja ul-Mulk's mother was a princess, the daughter of the Khan of Asmar.

== Political turmoil and provisional recognition ==
The Chitral Fort from across the river with its towers visible (1895).

When Mehtar Aman ul-Mulk died in 1892, a long war of succession broke out between his sons, with Umra Khan of Jandol and Sher Afzul in the background, which lasted three years. During his father's lifetime, Nizam ul-Mulk was the acknowledged heir to the throne. However Afzal ul-Mulk happened to be at Chitral on the momentous date while Nizam was absent and in Yasin. Afzal promptly seized all the arms and treasure in the fort of Chitral, and proclaimed himself Mehtar, and then proceeded to murder his brothers whom he saw as potential contenders to the throne. Meanwhile, he also addressed letters to the Viceroy of India and to the British Foreign Secretary, announcing the death of his father, and his own accession to the Mehtarship, with the consent of the people and of his brothers. However, after a reign of just a few months he was killed by his uncle Sher Afzul, who coming up stealthily from Kabul, attacked the fort by night and slew him. During this period Nizam ul-Mulk had been the guest of the British at Gilgit, and induced the belief amongst the Chitralis that his bid for sovereignty was backed by the force of British arms. Once the Nizam returned from Gilgit, he succeeded in ousting Sher Afzul who once again fled to Kabul. Nizam is believed to be an agreeable man, cultivated with many European tastes, but that was hardly helpful for his cause. Nizam ul-Mulk was murdered on 1 January 1895, while on a hunting tour, by his ungrateful brother, Amir ul-Mulk, whose life he had spared. The stimulated Amir, sent a deputation to Lieutenant Bertrand Gurdon, then Resident Political Officer in Chitral, asking to be recognised as Mehtar, but was told that the orders of the British Government must be awaited.

On 8 January 1895, 50 men of the 14th Sikhs marched down from Mastuj to join Gurdon in Chitral. On 1 February the British Agent arrived from Gilgit over the Shandur Pass, with an escort commanded by then Captain Townshend of Central India Horse, composed of 280 men of the 4th Kashmir Rifles i.e. Imperial Service Troops and 33 men of the 14th Sikhs under Lieutenant Harley. Their purpose was to give support to Gurdon, prevent blood spill from engulfing the British officers in Chitral and impede falling of the Mehtarship into hostile hands. Characteristically there were no cannons, with the advancing group, had there been, there would have been no subsequent siege. However hearing that Umra Khan had taken Kila Drosh, been joined by Sher Afzul, was in complicity with Amir and inching towards Chitral, Sir George Scott Robertson moved the British forces into the Chitral fort out of necessity. Shuja ul-Mulk at age 12 appeared intelligent, took keen interest in all matters of state and was said to have a natural kingliness of manner, with a sedative gravity. Thus at a durbar on 2 March 1895, Sir George declared that subject to the approval of the Government of India, Shuja ul-Mulk was recognised as Mehtar. Shuja's fate, thereon, was tied to that of the few British officers around him. Captain Townshend for whom he seemed to have real affection was made responsible for his personal safety and security. Shuja ul-Mulk was nicknamed by the British troops, ‘Sugar and Milk’. The enemy strength was computed to be around 1200 men. On 4 March the enemy closed in around the fort and the siege began, with the Chitralis compelled to join Sher Afzul for well-founded fear for their families' well-being. Inside the fort the British considered the stocks, put everyone on half ration and calculated that they could hold out for two and a half months or about the middle of June.

== Siege of Chitral and accession ==
The Chitral Fort (1895)

The narrative of the events in Chitral traveled far and wide, and obligated an intervention to maintain British prestige and restore morale. The British met in Calcutta and resolved to break the siege by military force.

For the relief of the besieged, the 1st Division of Field Army under Major General Sir Robert Low, with General Bindon Blood as his Chief of Staff was mobilized. In the meantime news reached the Government of India of the misfortune which befell the team of Captain Ross and Lieutenant Jones and the detachment of Lieutenant Edward and Fowler. Thus increasing the urgency to act and necessitating the simultaneous involvement of Colonel James Graves Kelly, commanding the 32nd Sikh Pioneers Gilgit to march to the relief from the north.

The Division under Sir Robert Low consisting of 15,000 troops, assembled into three infantry brigades, and with some 30,000 mules, horses and camels had by this time marched over the Malakand Pass into Swat and Dir. They were met by heavy resistance and engaged into fighting by the local tribesmen, but were on their way to Chitral. At the same time, with 400 soldiers from the 32nd Sikh Pioneers and a 2 gun section of No.1 Kashmir Mountain Battery. And a 1,000 levies used as porters, Colonel Kelly marched over the 12,000 feet Shandur Pass in freezing cold temperature and deep snow. On 18 April 1895 the column reached Koghazi where Colonel Kelly received a letter from Sir George who was then in Chitral, informing him that the besieging force of Sher Afzul and Umra Khan had withdrawn and the siege of Chitral fort had ended. The advance of Kelly's column with the more distant threat of Sir Robert Low's relieving force from the South had forced the abandonment of the siege. On 20 April 1895 Colonel Kelly's column marched into Chitral.

In the light of information that the situation in Chitral had normalised General Robert Low, halted the full advance and ordered then Brigadier General Gatacre to press on with a small column over the Lowari Pass to Chitral. On 15 May 1895 General Gatacre reached Chitral, with Sir Robert Low joining him the next day. Shuja presented Sir Robert and officers of the 2nd Battalion of the IV Gorkha Rifles with a cannon left over by Sher Afzul.

In the meantime, Shuja ul-Mulk was permanently installed as the Mehtar of Chitral, at a durbar held at the Chitral Fort on 2 September 1895.

== The issue of retention ==
Following the relief of Chitral and coronation of Shuja ul-Mulk as Mehtar, the question of future policy confronted the Government of India. Two alternatives presented themselves: either the British could, "abandon the attempt to keep up an effective control over Chitral or they could put a sufficient garrison there". As far as Shuja was concerned, a sudden pull out by the British would create a power vacuum and set the stage for further belligerence in the state of which he had just assumed rulership. It would also, undoubtedly place his life in great jeopardy.

Military experts were divided as to the aptness of each course. Lord Roberts lent his support to the advocates of retention. Arrayed against him were formidable military authorities, such as Sir Donald Stewart, Sir Neville Chamberlain, Sir John Adye, Sir Charles Gough and Lord Chelmsford. In hindsight the danger of an attack upon India from Russia in 1895 were infinitesimal. The Viceroy's Executive Council decided unanimously that to maintain British influence in Chitral was "a matter of first importance". On 13 June 1895, however, Lord Rosebery's Cabinet replied firmly that no military force or British agent should be kept at Chitral, that Chitral should not be fortified and that no road should be made between Peshawar and Chitral. They repudiated the Forward Policy which had been consistently followed since 1876. But in the nick of time the Liberal Government fell and Lord Salisbury's Cabinet reversed their decision. Thus the retention of Chitral was sanctioned and the road which that sanction necessitated was completed.

Chitral was to be partly a sovereign state under British suzerainty, her internal affairs were left entirely in the hands of Mehtar Shuja ul-Mulk and his advisers. The Government of India was to conduct and have control over all foreign relations. However the areas of Mastuj and Laspur were taken away and placed under independent governors by the British. A British garrison was installed at Chitral consisting of two Indian infantry regiments, a company of Sapper and Miners from the Indian Army Corps of Engineers and a battery of mountain artillery. Garrisons of local levies numbering 200 in all and armed with Snider–Enfield rifles were installed in detachments across Lower Chitral. It was promised that Shuja ul-Mulk as Mehtar would receive a monthly subsidy of 1,000 Indian rupees and an annual payment of 8,000 rupees to compensate him for the loss of the 2 districts.

One of Shuja's first act as Mehtar was to announce a general amnesty for all, who had taken part in the rebellion.

== Powers as Mehtar ==
Mehtar Shuja ul-Mulk reigned under a Council of Regency until he came of age and was invested with full ruling powers. His powers as Mehtar, in theory at least were most despotic, as Lord Curzon had noted in his diary.

He alone had the power of life and death. Theoretically the whole property of the country belonged to him, and in more than theory, he actually disposed of the persons and possessions of his subjects.

— Lord Curzon

As Mehtar, he was supreme in judicial, legislative as well as in executive authority.

== Formation of Chitral Scouts (1903) ==
On the invitation of the British, Shuja ul-Mulk in 1903, collaborated to create the Chitral Scouts, a native force which could serve in the defence of the land. Initially the force consisted of 1,000 men serving under two British officers, however with the passage of time the strength increased manifolds. The scouts served as local cragsmen, guarding passes and deterring outsiders. In contrast to the State Bodyguards the Chitral Scouts received extensive training and better quality weapons.

== Formalisation of State Bodyguard Force (1909) ==
Since the time of Aman ul-Mulk an informal para-military force existed. In 1909 the force was formalised and came to consist of 6 companies, each with 110 men, thus the State Bodyguard Force came into being. Shuja ul-Mulk as Mehtar was to be the Chief Commander of the force. With the passage of time the force grew so as to include as many as 40 companies consisting of over 4,000 strong men. The force played a vital role in the defence of Chitral during the Anglo-Afghan War of 1919.

== Legal Reforms ==
For centuries the seat of the Mehtar was at the helm of the judicial system. According to Colonel John Biddulph "The administration of justice was practically the will of the ruler, though nominally the precepts of the Shariyat are observed". Nonetheless it would be wrong to assume that all disputes were resolved through executive fiat or were the result of the Mehtar flaunting his prerogative. The vast majority of cases were resolved under Islamic or customary law.

Until the death of Aman ul-Mulk in 1892, there existed no department of justice. Civil disputes were resolved by the Mehtar after consultation with his aids in open court. Whereas criminal matter were ordinarily decided by a jury of Muslim theologians.

=== Judicial Council ===
In 1909, as part of an effort to reorganise the judicial system, the Judicial Council, locally known as the Kausal was established by Shuja ul-Mulk. Composed of up to 10 notables at a time, the body heard both civil and criminal petitions. Case were by and large decided in light of customary law and executive precedents. Sub-committees of the Judicial Council were set up at local level from where an appeal would lie to the principal seat and ultimately the Mehtar. It was not necessary for a petitioner to navigate the cumbersome judicial hierarchy, as the Mehtar could be petitioned directly in appropriate cases.

=== Mizan-e-Shariah ===
The same year Shuja established the Mizan-e-Shariah (‘Scales of the Shariah’), a body that would try cases which were to be decided under Islamic law. The Chief justice of this court was known as the Qazi-ul-Quza and was assisted by 4 or 5 reputable theologians, all appointed by the Mehtar. As a convention Shuja made it a point not to disagree with the Mizan or the Judicial Councils verdicts except in extraordinary circumstances. In such cases the documentation would be returned to the respective court for reconsideration. Prior to these reforms no documentation of civil or criminal cases were maintained. Whereas following them both the courts accepted written petitions and maintained a record of the same. In 1915 stamped paper was introduced and thereafter a documentation of all judicial proceedings was maintained.

== Re-integration of Mastuj and Laspur ==
Following his accession to the throne, the Districts of Mastuj and Laspur had been taken away from Chitral and placed under independent British Governors. Shuja was determined from his very accession to get them back as he justifiably considered them part of Chitral. During his visit in 1899 to India he took up his plea with Viceroy Lord Curzon and persisted in his demand until the Government handed over Mastuj and Laspur to him under an agreement on 13 May 1914.

== Efforts to reclaim Yasin etc. ==
After the control of Mastuj and Laspur reverted to Shuja ul-Mulk, he supplicated the British authorities to hand over the areas of Yasin and adjoining districts to him, as Yasin and adjoining districts were a part of Chitral during the reign of Aman ul-Mulk and had later been disjoined. However Maharaja Ranbir Singh of Kashmir the successor of Gulab Singh was adamantly opposed to the idea and wished for Yasin and adjoining districts to remain as a buffer between his dominion and the Mehtar's territory. British administrators considered the Maharaja's reservations perfectly justifiable. Shuja ul-Mulk's requests after having been given the fullest of considerations could not be acceded to as acknowledging his reversionary interest in these districts could potentially lead to conflict between Chitral and Kashmir.

== Third Anglo-Afghan War (1919) ==
The Mehtar of Chitral Sir Shuja ul-Mulk and the Chief Commissioner of the North West Frontier Province Sir George Roos-Keppel at Peshawar (1919).

In 1919, Amanullah Khan the Emir of Afghanistan broke off his relations with the British and declared war. India was attacked at different fronts including Chitral. Shuja ul-Mulk received an offer to switch sides on 8 May 1919, however he rejected the offer and kept his side of the pact with the British intact. The Chitral Scouts and Chitral State Bodyguards under the command of Nasir ul-Mulk fought valiantly and immobilised the Afghan attack.

Shuja ul-Mulk was Knighted in 1919 by being invested as a Knight Commander of the Most Eminent Order of the Indian Empire (KCIE). A year later, he was granted the title of His Highness and entitled to a personal salute of 11 guns. The Government of India presented him with 2,000 .303 Lee–Enfield rifles and a large stock of ammunition in recognition of his loyalty. A further consignment of 300 rifles were presented to him in 1925, with almost 700 more in 1927. In 1929 he received two cannons as gift from the British.

== Reign (1895–1936) ==
Mehtar Shuja ul-Mulk reigned under a Council of Regency until he came of age and was invested with full ruling powers. He ruled for 41 years, during which Chitral enjoyed an unprecedented period of internal peace. He visited various parts of India and met a number of fellow rulers. In the winter of 1899–1900, Shuja ul-Mulk in company of the Chief of the Gilgit Agency visited the Viceroy of India at Calcutta. It was the first of a series of visits which immensely enlarged his mental horizon. In May 1902, the Mehtar was present at the Vice-Regal Durbar at Peshawar. He was invited to the Delhi Durbar and attended the Coronation Durbar at Delhi in 1903 where he was invested as a Companion of the Most Eminent Order of the Indian Empire (C.I.E). In 1903, the Commander-in-Chief of India Lord Kitchener who was making a personal inspection of India's mountain frontiers, in the company of General Hubert Hamilton and Sir William Birdwood visited Chitral. Shuja ul-Mulk extended to them a very warm reception. Upon the former's suggestion the Mehtar commissioned the laying of a telegraph line between Chitral and Gilgit.

During the cold weather of 1904–1905, he visited India again and the following year he met His Royal Highness the Prince of Wales George Frederick Albert (later King-Emperor George V) at a garden party at Government House Peshawar. He paid an informal visit to Simla in September 1907 for ten days, and was granted an interview with His Excellency Lord Minto.

Shuja ul-Mulk attended His Majesty the King Emperor's Durbar at Delhi in 1911 and received there the Delhi Durbar Medal. In 1911 Shuja ordered Mirza Muhammad Ghufran to write a book documenting the history of Chitral for which he received considerable tracts of land in different parts of the state. The Tarikh-i-Chitral was written in Persian, compiled and finalized in 1921. It is a landmark work for the history of Chitral and the Hindu Kush region. In May 1918 Sir George Roos-Keppel visited Chitral in an effort to rally support of the Mehtar should war breakout on the frontier. In so visiting, Sir George Keppel became the first Chief Commissioner of the North-West Frontier Province to do so. He was received with great hospitality and returned much enthralled by the Mehtar's assurances. In 1919, in recognition of his loyalty and services during the recently concluded Third Anglo-Afghan War, Shuja ul-Mulk was granted a personal salute of 11-guns, along with a Knighthood by being appointed Knight Commander of the Most Eminent Order of the Indian Empire, with the title of His Highness following in 1920. The salute and title were made permanent and hereditary to his successors in 1932.

In 1921, Shuja ul-Mulk visited India and met the Prince of Wales Edward Patrick David (later Edward VIII) on the latter's visit to Ajmer that November. He spent two days at the Viceregal Lodge Delhi, as the guest of Viceroy Lord Reading. He went on to visit Indore, Bombay before arriving at Jammu where he was received at a formal Durbar by the Maharaja of Kashmir Pratap Singh and treated as a state guest. In 1923 Lord Rawlinson the Commander-in-Chief of India while undertaking a trip to the northern outposts of India visited Chitral as a state guest of the Mehtar.

In 1923–1924, Shuja ul-Mulk went on a pilgrimage to Arabia where he visited Mecca and offered the Hajj. The trip commenced in November 1923, with Shuja leaving Chitral and visiting en route Peshawar, Delhi and Bombay. Embarking at Bombay, he proceeded to Basra, Baghdad, Jerusalem, Jeddah, Mecca and Medina. At Medina he remained the guest of King Hussein. He returned to Chitral in August 1924. That year Field Marshal Sir William Birdwood visited Chitral and was entertained as a state guest of the Mehtar.

The same year, Islamia College's student elected body (the Khyber Union), granted honorary life-membership to Shuja ul-Mulk. Shuja was on friendly terms with Sir Sahibzada Abdul Qayyum who had previously served as Assistant Political Agent in Chitral. Upon encouragement from the latter Shuja had made a contribution of Rs 20,000 towards the setting up of the institution, with encouragement from the latter, he began participating in the growth of the institution. When time permitted he presided over meetings of the Trustees of Islamia College. Shuja was elected President of the Islamia College Management Body and visited the institution in that capacity in 1928 and 1931.

In 1926, Shuja ul-Mulk attended the Vice Regal Durbar at Peshawar. He visited India again in 1928 with his visit lasting from 8 October to 1 December that year. During this visit, he was accompanied by the Assistant Political Agent Chitral. Shuja began his tour by visiting Swat where he was entertained as a guest of the Wali at Saidu. He proceeded to Peshawar where he remained a guest of Sir Norman Bolton before embarking for Rampur upon the invitation of His Highness the Nawab of Rampur Sir Hamid Ali Khan. Shuja also visited the Prince of Wales Royal Indian Military College at Dehradun where he enrolled his younger sons for private education. At Delhi he was accorded an interview with Viceroy Lord Irwin. In November 1931, he visited India again and held a meeting with Viceroy Freeman Thomas, the Marquess of Willingdon regarding the Government of India's policy towards the North West Frontiers. Upon return to Peshawar he stayed a considerable time in the city holding talks with Sir Ralph Griffith before returning to Chitral via air on 27 April 1932.

== Reforms ==
Following his accession, Shuja ul-Mulk, guided by his mother and the Commissioned Indian Officers, began introducing widespread and comprehensive reforms.

=== Land records ===
From 1898, Shuja ul-Mulk with assistance from the British, reorganized the state's finance machinery. For the first time, the record of all lands and land owners along with the rate at which they were liable to pay revenue to the state was documented in a register. The documentation ensured that tax evasion did not go unnoticed by the state. The register also contained details of state lands allotted to tenant farmers for sharecropping.

=== Minerals ===
Much interest was shown by Shuja ul-Mulk in exploiting the mineral resources of the state. He employed entire families to pan the Chitral river for Gold dust, the cash generated went to the state coffers. Other minerals extracted included orpiment, silver, lead, antimony, crystallised quartz, iron ore, copper and potassium nitrate. The mineral exports, particularly exports of orpiment to China, proved lucrative and turned in a handsome profit. By 1914, export of orpiment fetched an average of 20,000 Kabulis.

=== Octroi ===
In the summers, when snow cleared over the Dorah Pass and Lowari Pass, goods of various kind were brought over these passes to Chitral. Traders carting merchandise into and out of the Chitral, as well as those in transit, were historically required to pay a tax known as octroi. The collection of octroi was regulated. By 1919, octroi was fetching the state earnings of almost 4,000 Indian rupees annually. This increased in subsequent years and between 1932 and 1936, for instance, the average annual income from octroi stood at 19,680 rupees. State officials collecting the tax were required to issue printed receipts to merchants, this measure disallowed corruption.

=== Slavery ===
Towards the end of the 19th century, young, attractive man and women could be bought and sold for about 300 Kabulis, whereas children could fetch anything from 100 to 300 Kabulis. The practice of slave trade had declined in the 1880s, Amir Abdur Rahman Khan of Afghanistan during his reign (1878-1901), had banned slavery and closed down the slave market in Kabul Province. However, in British India the slave trade legally continued until 1895 before it was banned by the British colonial administration.

=== Fines ===
Chitral during the reign of Shuja ul-Mulk, as his predecessors, was by and large a law-abiding society, crime rate was meagre. Fines collected went to the aggrieved person or family and were meant to serve as compensation. Shuja ul-Mulk decreed that a certain portion of the fines collected would go to the exchequer.

=== Ushr ===
The concept of ushr (tithe) had subsisted, in certain pockets of Chitral, for some time. After consulting state theologians, Shuja ul-Mulk in 1910 took the concept to scale and imposed ushr on a variety of agrarian produce. This new tax was fervidly resisted, particularly in the Ismaili majority Mastuj region. Nevertheless, it was forcibly imposed throughout Chitral by 1918. The grains collected went into state granaries, with the revenue department keeping a record of what had been accumulated. State officials, including the Bodyguard Force received grains from the ushr stock. The records of 1928 reveal that 6,610 maunds of stocks lay in state granaries that year. Following the Siege of Chitral there was permanent British military presence in Chitral. Naturally the forces needed food supplies and initially these were sent over the Lowari Pass. It was soon realised that the cost of conveyance was too exorbitant. Eventually, the British authorities in 1902, awarded the Mehtar the contract to supply the troops. With the passage of time this arrangement earned the state a substantial income which, between 1932 and 1936, averaged 218,800 Rupees annually.

=== Narcotics ===
In the 19th century traffic in narcotics was not state regulated. In 1902, a warehouse was established at Boroghil. A fraction of the cannabis and opium shipments were consumed in Chitral with the bulk being sold in markets as far afield as Kabul, Peshawar, Lahore and Bombay. By 1928 the Mehtar was earning 30,000 Rupees annually from the narcotics trade. In later years, cannabis and opium were locally cultivated in Chitral and thus the local produce further added to state revenue.

=== Timber ===
Timber trade with Afghanistan had begun in the 19th century. Since the Mehtar enjoyed de facto rights over all forests of Chitral, the revenue generated accrued to the treasury. During the reign of Aman ul-Mulk the trade was at its flourishing best and sometimes earned the state up to 40,000 Kabulis annually. Aware of the value of timber, Shuja ul-Mulk established a Forestry Department in 1908. The department regulated not only the timber trade but also introduced measures to control the use of timber locally, including the imposition of a tax on firewood. Trade in timber continued under Shuja ul-Mulk. However it came to a complete halt following the Anglo-Afghan War of 1919, with sales plummeting. This situation persisted for rest of Shuja's reign.

=== Markets and shops ===
To cater to the growing market Shuja ul-Mulk ordered the building of new shops and caravanserais. Officer were appointed to regulate the supply of goods and prices. The new shops built in Chitral, Lot Kuh and Drosh brought in plenty of revenue for the state.

=== Tailor house ===
Until the 20th century, the Mehtar's wardrobe contained local dress, made from local fabric only. This gradually changed with Shuja ul-Mulk who in 1914 employed no less than 12 tailors, setting up a tailoring house which would import fabric and prepare dresses for the Mehtar and the royal household. In addition to a tailoring house, Shuja set up a state laundry, near the Chitral Fort. It handled the wear of the royal family and the uniforms of the State Bodyguards.

=== Education ===
Education received greater official patronage under Shuja ul-Mulk. Chitral, Drosh, Drasun, Lot Kuh, Mastuj and Shagram saw the establishment of elementary school for boys. Religion and Persian literature were the main subjects being taught here. The state provide grain and other finances to these educational institutes. Shuja ul-Mulk also sent his sons to far off places such as Peshawar, Aligarh and Dehradun to receive modern education.

=== Healthcare ===
Rampant epidemics and ailments such as hepatitis, cholera, typhoid and tuberculosis claimed a multitude of lives in Chitral each year. Shuja's rule saw the establishment a hospital in Chitral and another in Drosh. In these hospitals the services of qualified doctors, paramedics and pharmaceutical medicines could be availed.

=== Telegraph and Telephone ===
The prospect of setting up a telegraph line between Chitral and headquarters of neighbouring Gilgit was discussed in 1892, during the life of Aman ul-Mulk. Following the Chitral Expedition an experimental telegraph line was installed over the Lowari. In 1903, during the reign of Shuja ul-Mulk, Chitral and Gilgit were connected via telegraph. In the next year or so telegraph and telephone were set up across the breath of the state connecting all headquarters. Thus the telephone became an integral part of the state machinery in conducting the affairs of the state. It is said that Shuja spent his early evenings on the telephone relaying and relieving messages from distant administrative units of the state to keep himself abreast. To operate and repair the machinery, technicians were called in from India.

=== Postal service ===
After 1892, the British began to improve communications within Chitral and in 1895, a regular postal service was launched. Thereafter, state correspondence became a daily routine.

=== Levy Company ===
Shuja ul-Mulk also organised a small force known as the Levy Company, consisting of barely over a hundred men, the force's sole responsibility was to protect the state postal service. Although small, the task the force performed was invaluable for the state.

=== Irregulars ===
Aware that the task of guarding the border with Afghanistan was too herculean even for the two regular state forces i.e. Chitral Scouts and Chitral State Bodyguards, Shuja ul-Mulk armed the villagers of Urtsun, Ashurait, Domel, Langurbat and Arnawai with rifles and ammunition to patrol and guard the southern forested border of Chitral. This Irregular force known as the Ashurait-Domelnisar Company unlike the other two state forces received local training, however owing to their special knowledge of the locality were best equipped to deal with intruders.

=== Intelligence service ===
Until the reign of Shuja ul-Mulk the only means of flushing out criminals was the concept of collective responsibility. The carrot and stick diplomacy was deployed, whereby citizens on the one end were offered incentives and on the other coerced with sanctions into revealing the identity of criminals. This concept endured in the days of Shuja but was supplemented with a secret intelligence service. The service had its informants in almost each village who would report to the capital. It is believed that the step lowered crime rate further.

== Routine ==
Shuja ul-Mulk's typical day as Mehtar would commence with the rising sun and offering of morning prayers. Breakfast would soon follow, traditionally a few selected nobles would be invited to this exclusive gathering. Following breakfast, he would attend to matters of state.

Important mail would be drawn to the Mehtar's attention early in the day. Shuja ul-Mulk would dictate a reply, which his secretary would jolt down to prepare a draft. The draft would be shown to him the following morning and might be approved, reworded or redrafted where after only, Shuja ul-Mulk would affix his signature. However some letters were handled quite differently with the letters being read out aloud in open court to elicit the opinion of notables and tribal chiefs prior to preparing a response.

In the morning hours of the day, time was reserved for individual petitioners. Citizens of every class irrespective of gender or status were permitted audience with their ruler. Those who could not plead their case in the morning could do so later in the afternoon. In spite of his immense supremacy Shuja was remarkably accessible.

Shuja ul-Mulk would spend a good part of his early evenings on the telephone, relaying and receiving messages from various parts of the state, to keep himself abreast of local developments, after which he would attend the Mahraka.

Conforming to generation old tradition, Shuja ul-Mulk would have his afternoon and evening meals at a gathering attended by nobles and elders called the Mahraka. It was considered highly coveted for anyone to be invited to this congregation, which the Mehtar would preside over. The Mahrakah was a decorous event, where meals would be followed by prolonged discussions on serious state matters.

== Hobbies and interests ==
A love of sport, characteristic of the peoples of the Hindu Kush, was shared by the Mehtar. Shooting, falconry, polo, chess, and listening to singing accompanied on the sitar, all came within the ambit of his relaxations. Falconry was his favourite sport, and he was very proud of the unrivalled skill of his falconers.

== Marriage of States ==
Shuja ul-Mulk was empathetic to the idea of inter-state and royal-intermarriages, for strategic and political purposes. His sister was married to Miangul Abdul Khaliq, the grandfather of the Wali of Swat. She acted as de facto ruler of Swat for many years after the death of her husband. Another one of his sisters was married to the Nawab of Dir. His daughter was married to Naqibzada Pir Sayyid Jamal ud-din Al-Gilani, a direct descendant of Abdul Qadir Gilani, patronym of the Qadiriyya order. His granddaughter was married to Nawab Muhammad Said Khan, the Nawab of Amb.

== Controversy ==
For several centuries, the heterogeneous society of Sunnis, Shia Ismailis and the Kalash had lived together in harmony without any overt hostilities. However tension arose between Shuja ul-Mulk and his Ismaili subjects. In 1910, Shuja ul-Mulk imposed statewide ushur tax, which was most bellicosely opposed by the Ismaili community. In 1917, the community launched a movement to resist the tax, which was remorselessly put down in Mastuj with state brutality. Bulbul Shah, the religious figure at the forefront of the movement was exiled and forced to migrate to Afghanistan.

Upshot of all this was the cultivation of mistrust amongst the Ismaili community who regarding themselves as having been persecuted and felt inclined to resolve disputes within the community without involving state authorities, much to the Mehtar's annoyance. This generated reciprocal skepticism in Shuja ul-Mulk who suspected the Ismaili leaders of spying on him on behalf of Gilgit and Badakhshan. In 1923, the misgivings were further fuelled when an Ismaili missionary from India by the name of Sabz Ali travelled to Chitral and instructed the community to continue to have its disputes resolved under the community's own auspices. Perceiving this as an omen of insurrection Shuja ul-Mulk gave the orders to forcibly convert Ismailis to Sunnis, thus leading to even wider unrest. The Mehtar had completely misjudged the situation and was treading down a muddy path. Eventually the British authorities intervened and persuaded Shuja to put a halt to the persecution. An inquiry was conducted under Major Hopkinson, which submitted a detailed report. Reconciliation was brought about between Shuja and leaders of the Ismaili community by the efforts of the Political Agent Malakand Agency. In 1926, Shuja at the behest of the British declared an amnesty for all Ismailis, the matter was laid to rest.

While it is true that following his pilgrimage to Mecca in 1923–1924, Shuja became more religious. It is hard to conceive his intentions in persecuting the Ismailis as being religiously motivated given the paradox that at that time other religious communities such as the Kalash, Sikh and Hindues resided in Chitral as well. Sikhs and Hindus, had and were allowed to retain, their monopoly in trade and commerce. And there are no reported incidents of state persecution directed against them. Describing him in 1937, Bertrand Gurdon wrote,"Shuja ul-Mulk was a devout Sunni, and made the pilgrimage to Mecca in 1924, but bigotry and fanaticism found little place in his character."

== Honours ==
- Knight Commander of the Most Eminent Order of the Indian Empire (KCIE) in 1919
  - (he had been appointed a Companion of the Most Eminent Order of the Indian Empire (CIE) in the 1903 Durbar Honours)
- Delhi Durbar Gold Medal (1903)
- Delhi Durbar Gold Medal (1911)
- King George V Silver Jubilee Medal (1935)

== Death ==
Shuja ul-Mulk died on 13 October 1936. He was buried in his ancestral graveyard adjacent to the Royal Fort in Chitral. He was succeeded as Mehtar by his eldest son, Nasir ul-Mulk.
