= Shahi Mosque, Chitral =

Mosque in Khyber Pakhtunkhwa, Pakistan

Shahi Mosque شاہی مسجد
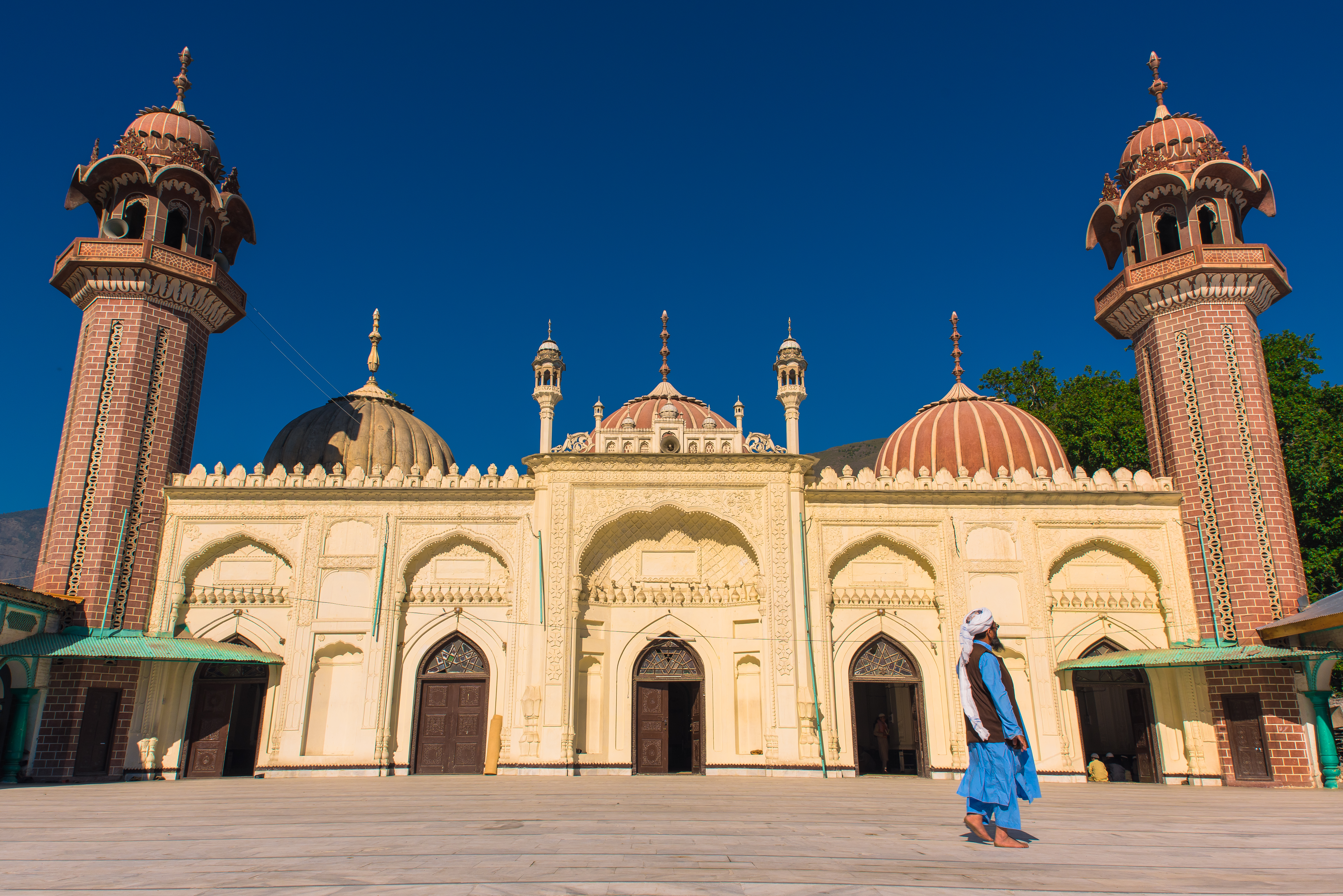

Religion
- Affiliation: Sunni Islam
- District: Chitral
- Province: Khyber Pakhtunkhwa
- Ecclesiastical or organizational status: Active

Location
- Location: Chitral District
- Interactive map of Shahi Mosque شاہی مسجد
- Coordinates: 35°51′20″N 71°47′22″E

Architecture
- Type: mosque
- Completed: 1924
- Construction cost: 9 Lakh Rupees

Specifications
- Capacity: 20,000
- Dome: 3
- Minaret: 2
- Materials: Red sandstone, marble

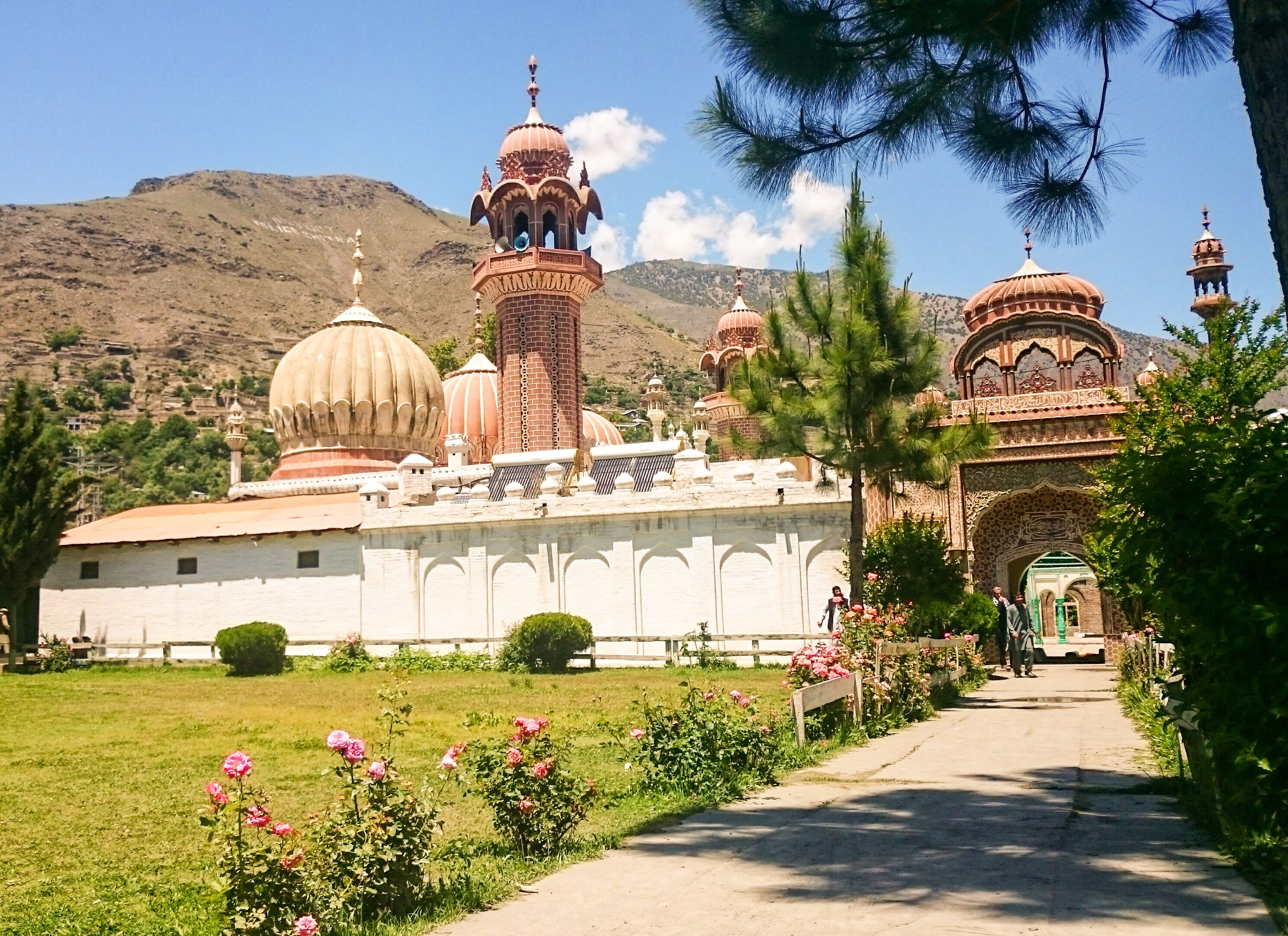
Shahi Mosque, Chitral

The Shahi Mosque is the main mosque in the town of Chitral, Khyber Pakhtunkhwa, Pakistan. It is located on the bank of the Chitral river adjacent to the Chitral Fort. It was the principal mosque of Chitral at the time of the existence of the State of Chitral. The mosque was built on the orders of the ruler Shuja ul-Mulk in 1924.

== See also ==
- List of mosques in Pakistan
- Shuja ul-Mulk
- Chitral Fort
- Chitral (princely state)
