= Chitral Bodyguard =

Chitral Bodyguard, or informally the Mehtar's Bodyguard, was a military force under the direct command of the Mehtar of the princely state of Chitral.

== History ==
Upon British occupation of Chitral following the Chitral Expedition of 1895, the British took a keen interest in reorganizing the state's military capabilities. In 1903 the Chitral Scouts, a force under direct British command, was raised. The Mehtar (native ruler) was also entitled to a personal military bodyguard.

The Mehtar's Bodyguard was raised by Mehtar Shuja ul-Mulk in the early 1900s and consisted of a professional standing army which had been raised by his father Aman ul-Mulk in the 1880s and by conscripts from the Yuft caste of Chitral, who were exempted from taxes but served the Mehtar in times of war. The officers were selected from amongst the Katur and related clans.

The Bodyguard first saw active combat during the Third Anglo-Afghan War in 1919. The Bodyguard, under the command of Nasir ul-Mulk, captured Birkot in the Kunar Province of Afghanistan, carrying away much booty from Kunar as well as taking many prisoners. Another arm of the Bodyguard went north to defend the Dorah and Broghol passes with Badakhshan. Yet another company of the Bodyguard, led by Khan Bahadur Dilaram Khan, captured Barge Matal in Nuristan after some light hearted resistance by Afghan troops. The locals supported Chitral and reaffirmed their age-old allegiance to the Mehtar's rule.

The Chitral Bodyguards most noteworthy accomplishments were during the Kashmir War of 1947-48. Under the terms of instrument of accession, signed by Mehtar Muzaffar ul-Mulk, Chitral State would continue to maintain an armed force, thus Chitral was in a position to take the Gilgit Agency. Following the revolt of the Gilgit Scouts, the Mehtar sent his Bodyguard, under the command of Burhan-ud-Din, to secure Gilgit town and reinforce the Gilgit Scouts in the Astore Sector. In August 1948, the Gilgit Scouts had been conducting the Siege of Skardu for several months but had been unable to take the Dogra Garrison within the fortress of Kharpoche Fort), because they lacked artillery. In August a 400 strong force of the Chitral Bodyguard, under Mata ul-Mulk, arrived in Skardu, backed by four light Mountain Guns. The Gilgit Scouts left Skardu and pushed on into Ladakh, while the Bodyguard, with the help of artillery, took the Kharpoche Fort within weeks.

Following the death of Mehtar Muzaffar ul-Mulk and the constitutional crisis which subsequently erupted in Chitral State, the powers of the Bodyguard were curtailed. After 1954, the Bodyguard was reduced to a company of 100 men whose duty would be to serve as the Mehtar's personal security force. The Chitral Bodyguard was finally disbanded in 1969, when Chitral State was dissolved by the Government of Pakistan.

== Equipment and organization ==
The Headquarters of the Bodyguard was a portion of the Chitral Fort called Bodyguard-o-Sharaan where one company of Bodyguards was always stationed. Other companies of the Bodyguard would serve throughout the State. The total size of the Mehtar's Bodyguard in 1940 was 4000 men.

Upon its formation the Bodyguard used jezails of Badakhshani manufacture including the Siyah Kamaan and Kotha Kamaan together with the British .577 Snider–Enfield and .577 Martini–Henry. After 1920 these weapons were replaced by the Lee–Enfield .303. Swords were used for close combat up to and including the 1947-48 Kashmir War. The Bodyguard also had a Russian PM M1910 machine gun which had been donated by a Central Asian refugee prince fleeing the Bolshevik Revolution. The Bodyguard's artillery included several Afghan-made cannons (including four seized from Birkot in 1919) and six 3.7-inch mountain howitzers.

The Chitral Bodyguard followed the ancient Chitrali tradition of going into battle with the accompaniment of musicians playing war tunes or Jhang Waar. These tunes were played on the surnay accompanied by drums. During the capture of Birkot, the Afghans were surprised when they heard the Jhang Waar playing at dawn, as they did not have a tradition of martial music.

== See also ==
- Katoor dynasty
- First Kashmir War
