= Bertrand Evelyn Mellish Gurdon =

British army officer (1867-1949)

- Born: 2 September 1867; Simla, Punjab, India
- Died: 6 October 1949 (aged 82); Crowborough, Sussex, England
- Military career
- Allegiance: United Kingdom
- Branch: British Indian Army
- Service years: 1886–1918
- Rank: Lieutenant-Colonel
- Conflicts: Chitral Expedition

Lieutenant-Colonel Bertrand Evelyn Mellish Gurdon CIE DSO (2 September 1867 – 6 October 1949) was a British soldier and administrator. He gained prominence as an officer during the Siege of Chitral.

== Life and career ==
Gurdon was born on 2 September 1867 at Simla, Punjab, India, the third son of Major-General Evelyn Pulteney Gurdon. He was the uncle of the university administrator Bertrand Hallward.

Gurdon received education and training from Haileybury Imperial Service College and the Royal Military Academy Sandhurst. He was commissioned into the British Indian Army on 25 August 1886. His first posting was in the Foreign and Political Department of the British Indian Army. In 1892 he was posted as Assistant to the British Agent at Gilgit. As Lieutenant, in 1892, he was posted as Acting Assistant Political Agent in Chitral in the turbulent period following the death of Mehtar Aman ul-Mulk. He was serving in that capacity when the Siege of Chitral unfolded in 1895.

He played an active role during the conflict, and was subsequently decorated as Companion of the Distinguished Service Order. Following the lifting of the siege Gurdon was stationed in Chitral as Assistant Political Officer of the state until late 1902. In 1900 he was made a Companion of the Order of the Indian Empire. In 1903 he was appointed Political Agent of the Gilgit Agency and served there until 1906. In 1908 he was entrusted with the post of Political Agent Khyber Agency. His next posting was as Political Agent Rajputana Agency. 1912 saw Gurdon being promoted as Ltieutenant Colonel. He later served as Political Agent of the Phulkian States Agency from 1913 to 1916. He was scheduled for another promotion but owing to ill health sought leave and then premature retirement in 1918.

== Death ==
Gurdon died a natural death at the age of 82 in Crowborough, Sussex on 6 October 1949.
