= Muzaffar ul-Mulk =

Mehtar of Chitral from 1943 to 1949

- The Mehtar of Chitral
- Reign: 30 July 1943 – 12 January 1949
- Predecessor: Mehtar Nasir ul-Mulk
- Successor: Mehtar Saif-ur-Rehman
- Born: Muzaffar ul-Mulk; 6 October 1901; Chitral, British India
- Died: 12 January 1949 (aged 47); Chitral, Pakistan
- Burial: Chitral Fort
- Urdu: مظفر الملک
- Khowar: مظفر الملک
- Dynasty: Katoor Dynasty
- Father: Mehtar Shuja ul-Mulk
- Military career
- Allegiance: (British Raj) 1943–1947 (Pakistan) 1947–1949
- Conflicts: Third Anglo-Afghan War Indo-Pakistani War of 1947: Siege of Skardu

His Highness Muzaffar ul-Mulk (6 October 1901 – 12 January 1949) was the Mehtar of Chitral who reigned from 1943 to 1949. He took the important decision of Chitral's accession to Pakistan in 1947. He also dispatched his army into Gilgit in August 1947, to help secure that territory for Pakistan.

== Life prior to accession ==
Muzaffar ul-Mulk was born on 6 October 1901. He was the second son of Mehtar Sir Shuja ul-Mulk. He was given over for foster care at a young age and spent the early part of his childhood at his foster home. He received education from Islamia College Peshawar, ultimately ending up with an F.A. During the Anglo-Afghan War of 1919 he served with the Chitral State Bodyguards under the command of his brother Nasir ul-Mulk, in fending off the Afghan attack. In 1924 he returned to Chitral and became the Chief Secretary to his father Mehtar Shuja ul-Mulk. In 1930 he became the administrator of Torkhow region in Chitral. The designation was formally termed the Governor of Torkhow. In 1939 he accompanied Nasir ul-Mulk on pilgrimage to Mecca. Meanwhile, Muzaffar was to retain his administrative post until his unforeseen accession as Mehtar in 1943.

On 29 July 1943 Mehtar Nasir ul-Mulk died of a stroke. He had two daughters but no sons. As fate would have it, he died without leaving a natural heir. Thus the seat of power passed on to Muzaffar ul-Mulk, who was the Mehtar's immediate younger brother. The Political Agent of the Malakand Agency came to Chitral and formally recognised the new ruler.

== Reign (1943–1949) ==
After his accession as Mehtar, Muzaffar ul-Mulk embarked on an initiative to replace the existing administration, with his own appointees. He established a separate office for the Wazir-e-Azam Chitral and delegated to the office many administrative functions. In January 1944, the British Government presented Muzaffar ul-Mulk with a gift of 4 large cannons and 106 Martini–Henry Rifles.

By this period Muzaffar's health had steadily declined, in May 1946 it was discovered that the reason for his ailing health was diabetes. The effect of this reflected itself in his administration, which grew inoperative. By early 1947 large scale protests were held across the state, which entailed the Political Agent Malakand to come to Chitral and persuade the ailing Mehtar to dismiss some of the officials whose negligence had contributed to the situation. Some of the legitimate demands of the protesters were acceded to, resulting in the protests fading.

In early 1947 it was clear that it was a matter of time before the British would leave the subcontinent and two independent sovereign states would emerge. Conscious of this, Muzaffar ul-Mulk sent a delegate to Muhammad Ali Jinnah to convey that he wholeheartedly supported the cause of Pakistan and would in due time exercising his right under the Indian Independence Act 1947 accede to Pakistan. He also deposited Rs 40,000 into Mr Jinnahs Pakistan Fund.

In May 1947 Indian Secretary for Frontier and Tribal Affairs visited Chitral. Muzaffar ul-Mulk conveyed to him Chitrals plans of acceding to Pakistan and asked that the intention be formally conveyed to the authorities. Chitral became the first princely state to announce that it would accede to Pakistan. Although formal accession and signing of the Instrument of Accession occurred in November 1947. Thus Chitral became a part of Pakistan and a constitutional monarchy.

Meanwhile, it became clear that the Maharaja of Kashmir desired to accede to India. Considering this a betrayal of the Muslim majority populace of Kashmir, Muzaffar telegraphically conveyed to Maharaja Hari Singh that such a decision would provoke aggression from Chitral.

With the endorsement of Muzaffar ul-Mulk many mujahideen left Chitral to fight a jihad in Kashmir and be part of the conflict which had arisen. The jihadists were followed by the Bodyguards and the Chitral Scouts led by Mata ul-Mulk and Burhan-ud-Din. The Chitral forces fought for 4 months laying Siege to Skardu and returning with triumph.

== Death ==
On 12 January 1949, Muzaffar ul-Mulk collapsed to his illness and died. He was succeeded by his eldest son Saif-ur-Rehman as Mehtar.
