= Chitral Scouts =

Pakistani paramilitary force

- Urdu: چترال اسکاوٹس
- Founded: April 1903
- Country: Pakistan
- Branch: Civil Armed Forces
- Type: Paramilitary
- Role: Border patrol Counterterrorism; Counterinsurgency; Special operations
- Size: 7 wings
- Part of: Frontier Corps Khyber Pakhtunkhwa (North)
- Garrison/HQ: Drosh Cantonment
- Engagements: Indo-Pakistani War of 1947; Kargil War

Commanders
- Commandant: Colonel Sami Zaman Khan

Insignia
- Flag of Chitral Scouts

The Chitral Scouts (CS) (Urdu: چترال اسکاوٹس), also known as Chitral Levies, originally established in 1903 as the militia of the princely state of Chitral, is now part of the Frontier Corps Khyber Pakhtunkhwa (North) of Pakistan. They are recruited mostly from the Chitral and Kalash Valleys areas along the western borders and are led by officers from the Pakistan Army. The Frontier Corps of Khyber Pakhtunkhwa (North) falls under the control of the Ministry of the Interior. Its headquarters is at Chitral town, and it is commanded by a Colonel of the Pakistan Army.

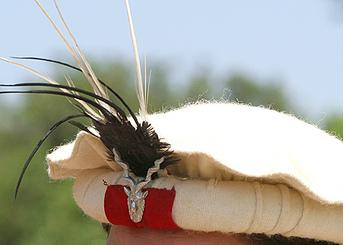
Pakol hat of the Chitral Scouts

The regiment had a 2020/21 budget of Rs. 1.7 billion, and is composed of seven battalion-sized wings, each headed by army officers with the rank of Lieutenant-Colonel or Major. Its role is to keep guard over Pakistan's western borders in peacetime and to assist the civil administration in maintaining law and order in the district of Chitral.

== History ==
The Chitral Scouts were formed in April 1903 in the princely state of Chitral on an initiative by the Viceroy of India, Lord Curzon of Kedleston. The word Scouts meant that the force was a standing paramilitary, not part of the British Indian Army, and it was under the command of a Chief of Chitral, but with a British attached officer. The objective of the force was to provide soldiers for the defense of India's North-West Frontier in case of invasion. The corps had an initial strength of 1,200 men and aimed to recruit the trained cragsmen of Chitral, that is, experienced mountaineers. They were provided with Martini–Henry and Snider–Enfield rifles. Ten rounds per rifle per Scout was the first line of ammunition. Pay and allowances of the Scouts were shared by the Political Agent and the Mehtar of Chitral Shuja ul-Mulk, who was also installed as the Honorary Commandant.

On raising, the initial batch of Scouts, mostly from Upper Chitral, were given extensive training-in-drill for which the drill instructors from the regular British Army unit stationed at Chitral were borrowed. Firing was the main thrill of the recruits, the air was informal, with polo being a major attraction in the evening when the Scouts would show their prowess.

== Third Afghan War 1919 ==
The war itself was not focused on the Chitral sector, however, Afghanistan had much more chances of success in Chitral than anywhere else. Afghanistan had kept its word during the World War I, but then the chain of events inside Afghanistan necessitated the launching of a Jihad by Kabul, which it did in the summer of 1919 with great dexterity and achieved stunning results in the Waziristan sector. Amir Amanullah broke his relations with British India because it had delayed in accepting his kingship and more so politically to have public support. The Mehtar of Chitral also received one such firman from Ammanullah on 8 May 1919. However, Shuja ul-Mulk rejected the offer and kept his side of the pact with the British intact. Consequently, Chitral prepared itself for an attack.

Initial Afghan movement started from 12 May onwards. They captured Arandu and soon the Scouts positioned at Galapach were overrun by a 600-strong force of Afghans. The Scouts retreated to Mirkhani and the Afghans were certainly moving forward with an aim to capture the Mirkhani and close the Lawari Pass.

=== Clash at Mirkhani ===
On 14 May 1919, Major N.F Reilly, along with two companies of Chitral Scouts, arrived at Mirkhani from Drosh. The retreating scouts were also harnessed and together these three companies put up a courageous fight on the Galapach position and reoccupied it. Afghan strength at Arandu was estimated to be over 600 supported by four artillery guns and a large tribal lashkar.

=== Battle of Birkot ===
Almost an entire British Garrison at Chitral was present at the Battle of Birkot, a small town in the Afghan province of Asmar where the bulk of the Afghans were concentrated. The battle opened up on 23 May at 0700 hours where Chitral Scouts carried out the advance and by 1400 hours the Afghans started retreating from Arandu. After the action, the Afghans started reinforcing themselves thus the political administration at Chitral very wisely decided to retreat back into its own areas.

On 3 June 1919, the armistice was signed between British India and the Afghan Government. However the situation at Chitral remained precarious with Afghan General Wakil Khan planning to move into Chitral. The situation in Chitral started returning to normalcy after the signing of the Treaty of Rawalpindi on 8 August 1919, thus ending the conflict from which the Chitral Scouts emerged as victors.

=== Orders, awards, and decorations ===
Three scouts were awarded with posthumous awards, including the Indian Order of Merit, one with the Military Cross, one with the Distinguished Service Order, and two each with the Indian Distinguished Service Medal and the title of Khan Sahib. Unlike the North Waziristan Militia and South Waziristan Militia, along with the Khyber Rifles, where mass defections took place, there was not even one defector among the ranks of the Chitral Scouts. In recognition of his loyalty and faithfulness, Shuja ul-Mulk was Knighted, given the title of His Highness, and a right of having a salute of 11 guns.

== Chitral State Scouts 1942-1956 ==
In 1942, the last of British soldier left Chitral as they were required at more important places due to the swinging fortunes of the Second World War. In the same year, the nomenclature of Chitral Scouts was changed to Chitral State Scouts and was placed under the Frontier Corps administrative control.

== Indo-Pakistani War of 1947 ==
At the time of the Indo-Pakistani War of 1947, the Chitral Scouts were still a force under the control of the ruler of Chitral. With the Gilgit Scouts, the Chitral Scouts played a leading role in the campaigns in the Baltistan territory.

The 3 June 1947 plan had left no option to the princely states but to choose either between India or Pakistan. Mehtar Muzaffar ul-Mulk had good relations with Quaid-e-Azam and thus Chitral acceded to Pakistan in August 1947.

Tension over Kashmir had already escalated and Muzaffar ul-Mulk declared jihad for the liberation of Kashmir and sent his Bodyguards to fight alongside the Chitral Scouts, under the command of Mata ul-Mulk. Colonel Mata reached Skardu via the Deosai plains, adopting and circumnavigating the Indian held Tsari Pass and thus descending upon the Skardu city and laying siege. On 14 August the besieged commander Lieutenant Colonel Sher Jung Thapa sent his emissary with a white flag to Colonel Mata, accepting surrender terms under Geneva Convention.

== Chitral Scouts in 1956 ==
In 1956 the Chitral State Scouts were reverted to the identity of Chitral Scouts, for the reason that Pakistan became a republic and from dominion status and all the Princely States were amalgamated into the One Unit.

== Kargil War ==
The Chitral Scouts also saw service in the Kargil War of May–July 1999. For the Kargil operation, Pakistan army launched forces exclusively from the Northern Light Infantry. These included 5, 6, 8 and 12 NLI battalions in full strength and elements of 3, 4, 7 and 11 NLI with the Chitral and Bajaur Scouts employed for logistic support.

== Role ==
The Chitral Scouts serve as the first line of defence as force is responsible for the patrolling of Chitral portion of Afghanistan-Pakistan border that cuts through Lower Chitral and Upper Chitral districts on Pakistani side whereas Nuristan province and Badakshan province on Afghanistan side. The Scouts also patrols strategic Wakhan Corridor, which is a tri-junction between Afghanistan, Pakistan and Tajikistan. Additionally, the Chitral Scouts provides security to the key installations located across the Chitral region such as Golen Gol Dam, Shandur Pass and Loweri Tunnel. The force plays a pivotal role in the defence of various projects of CPEC. Since the US invasion of Afghanistan in 2001, the Chitral Scouts has played a frontline role against terrorism.The force also assists local Law Enforcement Agencies in the maintenance of law and order across the region.

- Border Patrolling.
- Assist Army/FCNA in the defense of the country as and when required.
- Protect important communication centers and routes.
- Undertake counter militancy/criminal/terrorism operations on orders.
- Assist law enforcement agencies in maintenance of law and order.
- Safeguard important sites and assets

During times of extraordinary law and order crisis, the government occasionally grants power to the Chitral Scouts to arrest and detain a criminals.

== Units ==
- Headquarters Wing
- 141 Wing
- 142 Wing
- 143 Wing
- 144 Wing
- 145 Wing
- 146 Wing
- 166 Wing
