= Shahnamah-i-Chitral =

- Author: Baba Siyar
- Language: Persian
- Subject: History of Chitral
- Publication place: Chitral State
- Pages: 359

Shahnaamah-i-Chitral is a lengthy epic poem written by Chitrali poet Baba Siyar in the 19th century. The lengthy Persian narrative deals with some serious subject and contains details of heroic deeds and events of cultural and national significance.

== See also ==
- Tarikh-i-Chitral
- Nayi Tarikh-i-Chitral
