= Arandu, Khyber Pakhtunkhwa =

Arandu اَرنْدو Arnawai
- valley
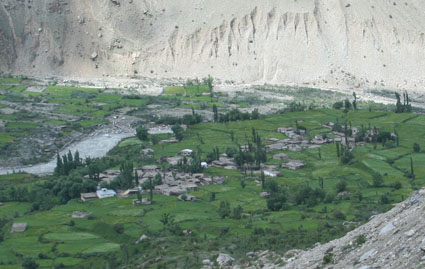
- Arandu

- Location in Pakistan
- Coordinates: 35°18′37″N 71°32′55″E
- Country: Pakistan
- Province: Khyber Pakhtunkhwa
- District: Lower Chitral District
- Elevation: 1,094 m (3,589 ft)

Population (2026)
  - Total: 13,520

Languages
  - Official: Urdu
- Time zone: UTC+5 (PST)
- PIN: 17250
- Website: Official Website

Arandu (ارندو) is a small valley is situated in Lower Chitral District of Khyber Pakhtunkhwa, Province Pakistan. The valley is on the banks of the Landai Sin River just above its confluence with the Kunar River. Arandu lies on the border with Kunar Province, Afghanistan.

== History ==
=== Anglo-Afghan War of 1919 ===
During the Afghan War of Independence in 1919, the area was part of the Chatral front of the war where the Afghans invaded British India and were led to victory over the British Empire and its Raj Subjects by Mir Zaman Khan.

== Demographics ==
Ethnically most residents are Chitralis, and Gawar-Bati is the language spoken by the majority of the people in Arandu. As Arandu has a low elevation and is the last village in Chitral District on the traditional trade route to Kabul, locally this language is also known as Aranduiwar. Pashto, Urdu, and Khowar are also spoken and understood.

== Geography ==
Arandu has the lowest elevation of any place in Chitral District Arandu is located on the banks of the Landai Sin River (Bashgal River) just above its intersection with the Kunar River (Chitral River), along the Drosh-Jalalabad Road. The Drosh-Jalalabad Road, including water traffic along the Kunar, used to be part of a major trade route from India to Kabul. Arundu is built on river benches that rise above the agricultural fields next to the two rivers. Arandu has an average elevation of 1094. The Lowari Range is across the Kunar to the north and west, while Mount Raskarla rises to 2,432 metres (7,979 ft) four kilometers to the east.

== Climate ==
Arandu maintains tropical weather during the summer and warmer temperatures than the rest of Chitral in winter. The winters are rainier than the summers. Its climate is classified as warm and temperate, and is listed as Csa by Köppen and Geiger. The average annual temperature is 17.6 °C in Arandu. The average annual rainfall is 800 mm.

Climate data for Arandu
Month	Jan	Feb	Mar	Apr	May	Jun	Jul	Aug	Sep	Oct	Nov	Dec	Year
Mean daily maximum °C (°F)	9.5 (49.1)	11.7 (53.1)	16.7 (62.1)	22.4 (72.3)	28.7 (83.7)	35.5 (95.9)	36.9 (98.4)	35.8 (96.4)	32.2 (90.0)	25.5 (77.9)	19.1 (66.4)	12.2 (54.0)	23.8 (74.8)
Daily mean °C (°F)	4.8 (40.6)	6.8 (44.2)	11.2 (52.2)	16.4 (61.5)	22.0 (71.6)	28.1 (82.6)	30.1 (86.2)	29.2 (84.6)	25.2 (77.4)	18.2 (64.8)	12.4 (54.3)	7.0 (44.6)	17.6 (63.7)
Mean daily minimum °C (°F)	0.1 (32.2)	1.9 (35.4)	5.8 (42.4)	10.4 (50.7)	15.4 (59.7)	20.7 (69.3)	23.3 (73.9)	22.6 (72.7)	18.3 (64.9)	11.0 (51.8)	5.7 (42.3)	1.9 (35.4)	11.4 (52.5)
Average precipitation mm (inches)	69 (2.7)	99 (3.9)	146 (5.7)	139 (5.5)	69 (2.7)	22 (0.9)	52 (2.0)	56 (2.2)	40 (1.6)	31 (1.2)	26 (1.0)	51 (2.0)	800 (31.4)
Source: Climate-Data.org

== See also ==
- Ziarat, Khyber Pakhtunkhwa
- Domel Nisar
- Kunar Province
- Lowari Pass
- Lowari Tunnel
