= Shigarnama =

17th-century Persian-language chronicle

The Shigarnama is a 17th-century Persian-language chronicle from Shigar, in Baltistan. It is one of the few historical sources for Gilgit-Baltistan dating prior to 19th century, and hence is a valuable source for reconstruction of history of Baltistan and the wider region.

Written by Sayyid Tahsin, Shigarnama is in verse form, and is also known as Jangnamah Raja Imam Quli Khan Amacha Shigar. It primarily deals with the history of the Amacha dynasty, and in particular, its greatest ruler, Imam Quli Khan, during whose reign it was probably penned down. It rarely gives the dates for the events described, but wherever it can be cross-checked with the other sources, its account has been found to be surprisingly accurate, says Dieter Schuh. Three major manuscripts of Shigarnama are known to exist.

== See also ==
- Tarikh-i-Chitral – 1921 book by Mirza Muhammad Ghufran
