= Amir ul-Mulk =

Mehtar of Chitral (1877–1923)

- The Mehtar of Chitral
- Tenure: 1895-1895 (two months)
- Predecessor: Mehtar Nizam ul-Mulk
- Successor: Mehtar Shuja ul-Mulk
- Born: 1877; Chitral
- Died: 1923 (aged 45–46)
- Buried: Chitral
- Residence: Chitral Fort
- Noble family: Kator Dynasty

Amir ul-Mulk (1 January 1877 – 23 December 1923) was the Mehtar (ruler) of the princely state of Chitral. He assumed power after arranging for the murder of his brother Mehtar Nizam ul-Mulk. His tenure as Mehtar was brief as he was removed from office in less than three months, before having the chance to consolidate his position.
