= Gawar-Bati language =

Indo-Aryan language spoken in Afghanistan and Pakistan

Gawar-Bati
- Narsati
- Native to: Pakistan, Afghanistan
- Region: Chitral, Kunar Province
- Native speakers: 36,000 (2017–2021)
- Language family: Indo-European: Indo-Iranian; Indo-Aryan; Dardic; Kunar; Gawar-Bati

Language codes
- ISO 639-3: gwt
- Glottolog: gawa1247
- ELP: Gawar-Bati

Gawar-Bati or Narsati is an Indo-Aryan language spoken in the Chitral region of northern Pakistan, and across the border in Afghanistan. It is also known as Aranduyiwar in Chitral because it is spoken in Arandu, which is the last village in lower Chitral and is also across the border from Berkot in Afghanistan. There are about 9,000 speakers of Gawar-Bati, with 1,500 in Pakistan, and 7,500 in Afghanistan. The name Gawar-Bati means "speech of the Gawar", a people detailed by the Cacopardos in their study of the Hindu Kush.

== Study and classification ==
The Gawar-Bati language has not been given serious study by linguists, except that it is mentioned by George Morgenstierne (1926) and Kendall Decker (1992).

It is classified as an Indo-Aryan language of the Dardic subgroup. However, the term Dardic is not linguistic but merely geographic.

== Phonology ==
The following tables set out the phonology of the Gawar-Bati language:

=== Vowels ===
	Front	Central	Back
Close	i iː		u uː
Mid	(e) eː		(o) oː
Open		a aː	

The status of short /e/ and /o/ is unclear.

=== Consonants ===
A breathy voiced series, /bʱ dʱ gʱ/, existed recently in older speakers—and may still do so.

		Labial	Coronal	Retroflex	Palatal	Velar	Glottal
Nasal		m	n	ɳ			
Stop	voiceless	p	t	ʈ		k	
Stop	voiced	b	d	ɖ		ɡ	
Stop	aspirated	pʰ [pf f]	tʰ	ʈʰ		kʰ	
Affricate	voiceless		ts	tʂ	tʃ		
Affricate	voiced		dz	dʐ	dʒ		
Affricate	aspirated		tsʰ	tʂʰ	tʃʰ		
Fricative	voiceless		s	ʂ	ʃ	x	h
Fricative	voiced		z	ʐ	ʒ	ɣ	
Approximant					j	w	
Lateral	plain		l				
Lateral	Fricative		ɬ ~ l̥				
Rhotic			r	ɽ			

== Orthography ==
It is rarely written. This alphabet is used in Pakistan:

Letter	ا	ب	پ	ت	ٹ	ث	ج	چ	ح	خ	ڄ	ݮ	څ	ځ	د	ڈ	ذ	ر	ڑ	ز	ژ	ݫ	س
Transliteration	ā, Ø	b	p	t	ṭ	s	ǰ	č	h	x	c̣	j̣	c	j	d	ḍ	z	r	ṛ	z	ẓ	ž	s
IPA	[aː], Ø	[b]	[p]	[t]	[ʈ]	[s]	[d͡ʒ]	[t͡ʃ]	[h]	[x]	[ʈ͡ʂ]	[ɖ͡ʐ]	[t͡s]	[d͡z]	[d]	[ɖ]	[z]	[r~ɾ]	[ɽ]	[z]	[ʐ]	[ʒ]	[s]
Letter	ش	ݭ	ص	ض	ط	ظ	ع	غ	ف	ق	ک	گ	ل	ݪ	م	ن	ݨ	ں	ه	ء	و	ی	ے
Transliteration	š	ṣ	s	z	t	z	ʔ	ǧ	f	q	k	g	l	ł	m	n	ṇ	˜	h	ʔ	w, ū, o	y, ī	e
IPA	[ʃ]	[ʂ]	[s]	[z]	[t]	[z]	[ʔ]	[ɣ]	[f]	[q]	[k]	[ɡ]	[l]	[ɬ~l]	[m]	[n]	[ɳ]	[˜]	[h]	[ʔ]	[w], [uː], [oː]	[j], [iː]	[eː]
Letter	تھ	پھ	ٹھ	چھ	ڄھ	څھ	کھ	َ	ِ	ُ													
Transliteration	th	ph	ṭh	čh	c̣h	ch	kh	a	i	u													
IPA	[tʰ]	[pʰ]	[ʈʰ]	[t͡ʃʰ]	[ʈ͡ʂʰ]	[t͡sʰ]	[kʰ]	[a]	[i]	[u]													
