= Muhammad Siyar =

Khowar poet (c. 1770–1840)

- Born: Mira Muhammad Siyar; 1770; Chitral
- Died: 1840 (aged 69–70); Chitral

Academic work
- Main interests: History, romantic poetry, epic poetry
- Notable works: Shahnamah-i-Chitral

Mirza Muhammad Siyar (c. 1770 – c. 1840) also known as Baba Siyar was a Chitrali poet and court chronicler who lived during the 18th and 19th centuries. He is considered one of the few great begotten poets of the Hindu Kush region. He composed the famous Shahnamah-i-Chitral.

== Sources ==
- Pello', S. (2023). Bābā Siyar and the Soul of the Unbeliever: Mapping the Persian Poetic Territories of Kāfiristān from Costantinople to Madaklasht. ISMEO. pp. 613–630. ISBN 978-88-6687-265-8.
