= Aman ul-Mulk =

- Mehtar of Chitral; Suzerain of Bashgal
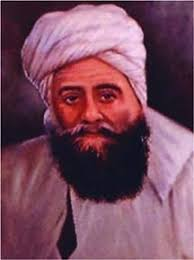

Mehtar of Chitral
- Reign: 1858 – 1892
- Predecessor: Mehtar Muhtarram Shah Kator III
- Successor: Mehtar Afzal ul-Mulk
- Born: Aman ul-Mulk; 1 January 1821; Chitral
- Died: 30 August 1892 (aged 71); Chitral
- Burial: Chitral Fort
- Dynasty: Katoor Dynasty
- Religion: Islam

Aman ul-Mulk (Khowar: امان الملک; 1 January 1821 – 30 August 1892) was the Mehtar (ruler) of Chitral, ruling from 1857 to 1892. Bashgal valley was also under his suzerainty. His rule saw Chitral reaching its territorial peak to Asmar in Afghanistan.

His death was followed by a period of civil war, culminating in the Chitral Expedition in 1895, after which Chitral became a princely state allied with British Raj.

== Early years ==
Muhtaram Shah Kator III was succeeded by Aman ul-Mulk. Aman ul-Mulk had previously killed his elder brother in 1856, thus ascending to throne unopposed in 1857.

Aman ul-Mulk ruled over Chitral extending from the borders of Kashmir on one side to the borders of Kafiristan and Panjkora on the other. The northern boundary of his dominion was the watershed of the Hindu Kush. In early years, up to 1871, Chitral still paid tribute to Badakhshan in slaves, although Chitral never acknowledged the suzerainty of Jehandar Shah or of the Afghans who dispossessed him.

== Treaties with British Raj ==
In 1878, Aman ul-Mulk being anxious of aggression by the Amir of Afghanistan signed treaty with the Maharaja of Kashmir. This brought him into direct contact with the Government of India, with whom from that time until his death he maintained friendly relations. By the agreement of 1878 Aman ul-Mulk received an annual subsidy of Rs 12,000 from the ruler of Kashmir. The Mehtar was to present the latter annually three horses, five hawks and five Tezi dogs. In 1885 a mission under Sir William Lockhart visited Chitral and was very cordially received. Lockhart was appointed first British Political Agent at Chitral.

== Territorial expansion ==
Aman ul-Mulk, secure and strengthened after 1878 treaty, swiftly eliminated his old rivals south of the Hindu Kush and was able as a result to expand his dominion to Asmar in Afghanistan. The two valleys of Chitral, along the border with Afghanistan were unified under Aman ul-Mulk in 1880, with encouragement from Colonel Biddulph. More than anything else, it was Aman ul-Mulk's sense of his own interests which led him to rely upon Kashmir and the British.

== Conflict with Afghanistan ==
For the first time after the withdrawal of the Gilgit Agency in 1881, the Amir of Afghanistan Abdur Rahman Khan, in a letter, claimed suzerainty over Chitral in 1882. He asked Aman ul-Mulk to acknowledge his suzerainty and declared that the British had no right of interference with the affairs of his Chiefship. The Governor General of India, Lord Ripon could not leave the letter unchallenged. After telegraphic references to London for permission to threaten Abdur Rahman with ‘force of arms if needful’, Ripon warned him, whereupon Abdur Rahman promised to desist from interfering in the affairs of Chitral in the future.

However, on 14 June 1887, officials of the Amir came to Chitral to arrange for the betrothal of one of the Mehtar's daughters to the Amirs eldest son, Sardar Habibullah Khan, and to hustle the Mehtar into concluding the matrimonial alliance. The Amir imposed political and economic pressures. Aman however did not crumble to this pressure and continued to be reluctant to enter into the said marriage alliance without the sanction of the British Government. In 1893, the Durand Line Agreement was signed between the Amir of Afghanistan and Colonel Mortimer Durand, under which the former was bound to not interfere in Bajaur, Dir, Swat and Chitral.

== Later events ==
In October 1889, Colonel Durand arrived in Chitral. The Mehtar's reception of his guest was most cordial. During the course of the visit, Aman agreed to the following depending on receipt of increased subsidy: assisting in opening up the Peshawar-Chitral road; improving the main path in his country to tracks passable by laden mules; and fortification of certain selected positions to be afterword's pointed out to him.

In 1886, and again in 1888, he sent two of his sons, Afzal ul-Mulk and Nizam ul-Mulk, down to India. They came back much impressed with what they had seen and did all they could to strengthen the alliance of their father with the Great Sircar.

By the time of Aman ul-Mulk's death in 1892, Chitral's primary importance was that it contained the series of valleys stretching from Wakhan to British held India. Fear of this area as an invasion route went back to 1874, amid the claim that Russia could be in British territory within thirteen days with an army if held Chitral. During the Viceroyalty of Lord Lytton, it was deemed expedient, in view of Russian military activity in Central Asia, to obtain more effective control over the passes of the Hindu Kush. And it was the same menace, real or fanciful, which prompted the Marquess of Lansdowne to re-establish the Gilgit Agency in 1889.

== Death ==
Aman ul-Mulk died unexpectedly on 30 August 1892. Although no foul play was suspected, the sudden death made most of the Chitralis believe that he was poisoned.

=== Aftermath ===
Until 1892, Mehtar Aman ul-Mulk had provided a sturdy bulwark to British interests. His death had jeopardised that security. The British preferred to conciliate Nizam ul-Mulk, as he was connected with Umra Khan of Jandul and with the influential Mullah Shahu Baba of Bajaur through his maternal uncle Kokhan Beg. He also had connections in Badakhshan, Hunza and Dir.

However, with Aman ul-Mulks death, civil war erupted in Chitral. A three way struggle for succession ensued between two of his sons, Nizam ul-Mulk and Afzal ul-Mulk, and their uncle Sher Afzal. Having the fortune of being on the spot Afzal took control and proclaimed himself Mehtar. The first thing that Afzal did was to invite as many brothers as were within reach to a banquet where he murdered them.

Nizam ul-Mulk was away in Yasin, of which he was the governor under the Gilgit agency, when the mehtarship was seized by his brother Afzal ul-Mulk. Anxious to consolidate his power Afzal asked the British that an officer might be sent to reside permanently in Chitral. Before, however, any arrangements could be made he was killed, after a short reign of a few months, by his uncle Sher Afzal. Nizam ul-Mulk at once hurried to Chitral and succeeded in ousting Sher Afzal.

It was the landing of William of Orange on a reduced scale and with Cashmere troops instead of Dutch guards. Twelve hundred men sent by Sher Afzul to oppose him fled to his side. The avuncular usurper, realising that it might be dangerous to wait longer, fled to Afghanistan, as James II had fled to France, was received by the ruler with hospitality and carefully preserved as an element of future disorder.

— Winston Churchill, The Story of the Malakand Field Force

Nizam, like his brother, asked that a political officer might reside in Chitral territory, and Captain Youngshusband was accordingly sent to Mastuj. Later probably not feeling himself very secure Nizam urged for the headquarters of the residence political officer who happened at that time to be Lieutenant Gurdon, to be shifted from Mastuj to Chitral but while the question was still under determination the Mehtar was murdered by his brother Amir ul-Mulk. Amir demanded recondition from Lieutenant Gurdon who was acting as assistant political agent in Chitral. When Amir ul-Mulk came to him he very properly said that he had no power to grant recognition until instructed to do so by the Government of India but that in all probability he would be recognised.

Amir ul-Mulk had shown himself quite unfit to rule. He had made himself hateful to the Chitralis. Sir George Robertson therefore declared that subject to the approval of the Government of India, Shuja ul-Mulk his younger brother was recognised as Mehtar. The critical nature of the situation leading up to the siege of Chitral is brought out very clearly in the speech made by Lord Elgin, the Viceroy of India, on 29 March 1895, to the Supreme Legislative Council.

== Legacy ==
Aman ul-Mulk is referred to in local chronicles as the Great Mehtar, who ruled over the valleys with what British officials described as oriental despotism between 1857 and 1892. Sir George John Younghusband denoted him as a "strong and astitute" ruler. Lord Curzon acclaimed him as "The very man for such a state and such times".

Though admirably suited to govern a savage people, British also viewed him as cruel, treacherous and vindictive. At his accession he killed all his near relations except his brother Sher Afzul, who fled. Aman ul-Mulk is believed to be the instigator of the murder of British explorer George W. Hayward through the agency of Mir Wali of Yasin. Sir Lepel Griffin called him – ''a translucent old savage''. Historian John Keay has put him down as "the cunning genius". Whereas orientalist Gottlieb Wilhelm Leitner has referred to him as, "A terrible man, who to extraordinary courage joined the arts of the diplomatist". With the few incidence of turbulence apart Chitral remained relatively undisturbed during his reign noting which Churchill wrote, "Meanwhile Aman ul-Mulk ruled in Chitral showing great respect for the wishes of the British Government and in the enjoyment of his subsidy and comparative peace".

== See also ==
- Gohar Aman
