= Drosh =

Town in Khyber Pakhtunkhwa, Pakistan

Drosh Tehsil تحصیل دروش دروسو تحصیل دروش تحصیل
- town
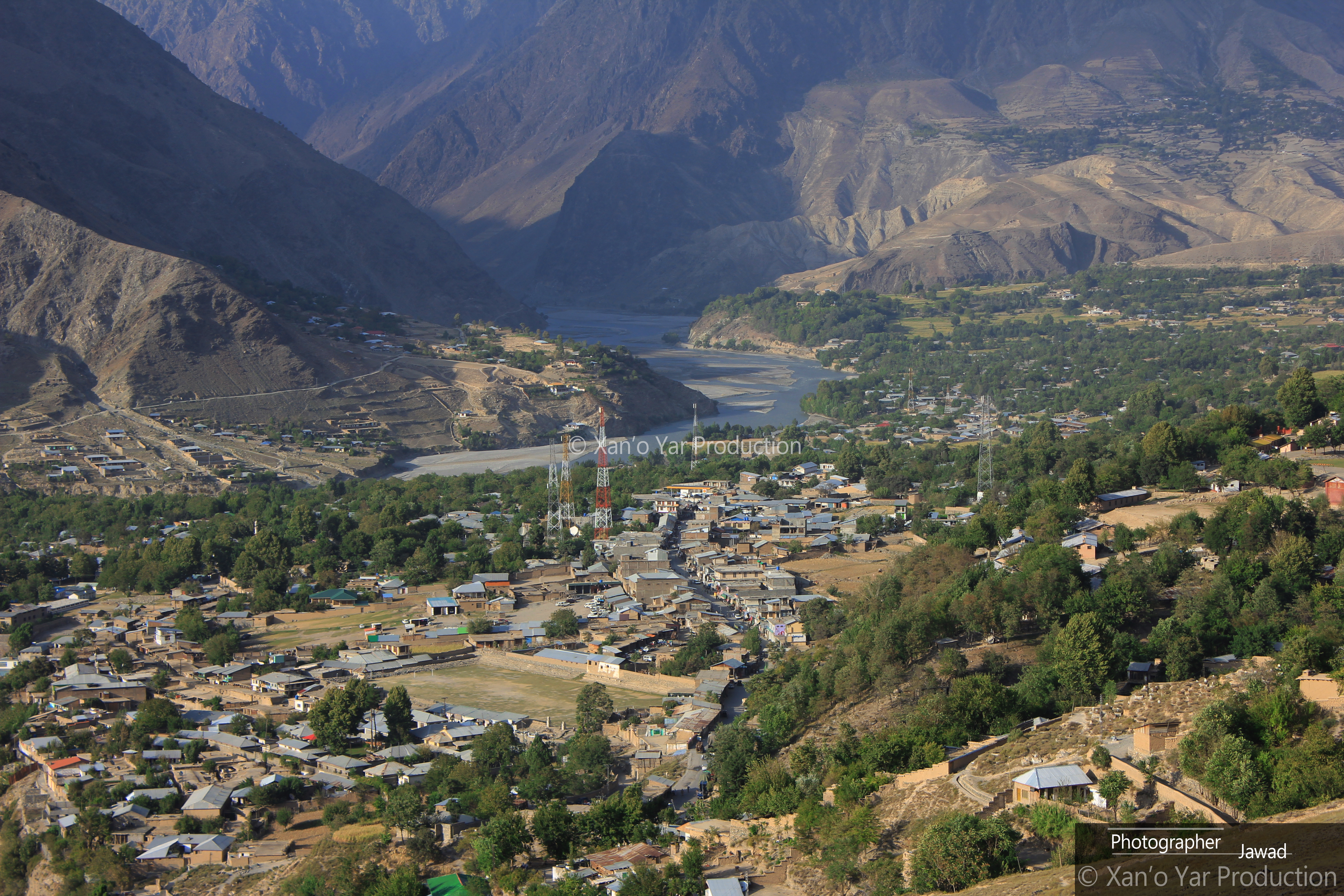

- Location in Pakistan
- Coordinates: 35.568°N 71.802°E
- Country: Pakistan
- Province: Khyber Pakhtunkhwa
- District: Lower Chitral District

Government
  - Chairman: Fareed Hussain Jan (IND (Note: Officially affiliated with the PTI, but filed nomination papers as an independent due to the PTI intra-party elections case))
- Elevation: 1,359 m (4,459 ft)
- Lowest elevation (Mirkhani valley): 1,233 m (4,045 ft)

Languages
  - Official: Urdu
  - Native: Chitrali language

Languages
- Time zone: UTC+5
- Postal code: 17220 - 0XX
- Website: lowerchitral.kp.gov.pk

Drosh (Urdu: دروش) is both a town and a name for the larger valley it is situated in Lower Chitral District of the Khyber Pakhtunkhwa Province of Pakistan. It is known for its strategic importance and traditional architecture. The surrounding region is characterized by lush green valleys, mountains, and rivers, which can also be referred to broadly as the "Drosh valley" area.

== History ==
Drosh town was the property of Mehtar of Chitral. Mehtar appointed his close relative as governor of Drosh. During the regime of the great Mehtar of Chitral (Aman UL Mulk), his brother Prince Kohkan Baig, was governor of Drosh. After 14 years, his attitude changed towards Afghanistan and Mehtar Aman UL Mulk appointed his son, Prince Shah UL Mulk, as governor of Drosh in 1872. Shah ul Mulk was governor of Drosh from 1872 to 1892. During that time, Drosh province was from Broze to Chaqansarai (Afghanistan). After the murder of Shah ul Mulk, Kohkan Baig became governor of Drosh for the second time. Later on, Kohkan Baig supported his other brother Sher Afzal. In 1932, Mehtar Shuja UL Mulk appointed his son, Prince Hissam UL Mulk, as governor of Drosh. He was a very strong governor with full power. He remained governor until 1947. In 1947, Chitral state was merged with Pakistan.

== Geography ==
Drosh is low elevation and is a large village in Chitral District on the traditional trade route to Drosh-Jalalabad Road. Drosh is located on 35° 33' 33" N and 71° 47' 44" E on the banks of the Landai Sin River (Bashgal River) just above its intersection with the Kunar River (Chitral River), along the Drosh-Jalalabad Road. The Drosh-Jalalabad Road, including water traffic along the Kunar, used to be part of a major trade route from India to Kabul. Drosh is built on river benches that rise above the agricultural fields next to the two rivers. The land is fertile.Drosh is one of the most densely populated areas in Chitral. Administratively, it is divided into five Union Councils .i.e. UC Sheshekoh Valley, UC Drosh 1, UC Drosh 2, UC Ashurate, and UC Arando. After the 2013 local government Act of Khyber Pakhtunkwha, these union councils were further devolved into twenty-two village councils. It was given the status of tehsil and TMO was also established in 2017.

== Climate ==
The climate in Drosh is warm and temperate. The rain in Drosh falls mostly in the winter, with relatively little rain in the summer. This location is classified as Csa by Köppen and Geiger. The average annual temperature in Drosh is 17.1 °C. The average annual rainfall is 676 mm. Drosh has a Mediterranean climate (Köppen climate classification Csa) with hot, mostly dry summers and cool moist winters with some snow.

Climate data for Drosh
Month	Jan	Feb	Mar	Apr	May	Jun	Jul	Aug	Sep	Oct	Nov	Dec	Year
Record high °C (°F)	20.6 (69.1)	23.3 (73.9)	31.0 (87.8)	37.5 (99.5)	42.5 (108.5)	47.3 (117.1)	47.2 (117.0)	45.1 (113.2)	42.0 (107.6)	37.6 (99.7)	30.5 (86.9)	22.6 (72.7)	47.3 (117.1)
Mean daily maximum °C (°F)	9.1 (48.4)	10.7 (51.3)	16.2 (61.2)	22.7 (72.9)	29.0 (84.2)	35.9 (96.6)	36.8 (98.2)	35.8 (96.4)	32.9 (91.2)	26.7 (80.1)	19.2 (66.6)	11.4 (52.5)	23.9 (75.0)
Daily mean °C (°F)	4.5 (40.1)	5.8 (42.4)	10.5 (50.9)	16.5 (61.7)	22.1 (71.8)	28.4 (83.1)	30.0 (86.0)	29.1 (84.4)	25.5 (77.9)	19.2 (66.6)	12.6 (54.7)	6.6 (43.9)	17.6 (63.7)
Mean daily minimum °C (°F)	−0.1 (31.8)	0.8 (33.4)	4.9 (40.8)	10.2 (50.4)	15.2 (59.4)	20.9 (69.6)	23.2 (73.8)	22.3 (72.1)	18.0 (64.4)	11.7 (53.1)	6.1 (43.0)	1.7 (35.1)	11.2 (52.2)
Record low °C (°F)	−11 (12)	−8.6 (16.5)	−5.5 (22.1)	−3.0 (26.6)	2.8 (37.0)	11.0 (51.8)	11.5 (52.7)	11.0 (51.8)	5.6 (42.1)	0.0 (32.0)	−3.2 (26.2)	−7.6 (18.3)	−11.0 (12.2)
Average precipitation mm (inches)	42.1 (1.66)	68.0 (2.68)	112.8 (4.44)	116.3 (4.58)	67.8 (2.67)	14.4 (0.57)	21.9 (0.86)	22.3 (0.88)	22.4 (0.88)	27.8 (1.09)	25.7 (1.01)	46.5 (1.83)	588.0 (23.15)
Average relative humidity (%) (at 17:00 PST)	41.9	40.3	37.6	32.6	25.3	18.3	23.5	27.1	23.8	24.0	26.5	37.4	29.9
Mean monthly sunshine hours	145.1	138.7	160.4	195.1	269.2	306.8	306.5	286.0	245.2	222.7	195.9	140.3	2,611.9
Source 1: NOAA
Source 2: Pakistan Meteorological Department (records and humidity)

== Demographics ==
The town has a population of about 20,000 people in 2017 Census. It makes the largest population town after Chitral city in Lower Chitral District.

=== Language ===
Khowar is by the majority of the people in Drosh with a few speakers of Pashto.

=== Ethnics ===
Ethnically, most residents are Kho people. Pashtuns and other community are also reside here.

== Educational institutions ==
- Drosh Public School & Degree College Drosh
- Govt girls degree college Shahnigar Drosh
- Govt Higher Secondary School Drosh (Boys)
- Frontier Corps Public School & College
- Govt High School Drosh
- Govt Girls High School Drosh
- Govt Girls Degree College kotgal gol Drosh
- Hira Model school, Degree College & College of Education Drosh
- Jinnah Public School & Degree College Drosh
- The Learner's School Drosh
- Iqra Hadiqat-ul-atfal school
- Muslim Model School Drosh
- RITE(Regional Institute for Teachers Training) Drosh
- Muslim Model School and College Bazar Drosh
- Muslim Model School Shahnigar Drosh
- Drosh Institute of Computer and Technical Education (DICTE)

== See also ==
- Arandu
- Chitral District
