= Tarikh-i-Chitral =

1921 book by Mirza Muhammad Ghufran

- Author: Mirza Muhammad Ghufran
- Language: Persian
- Subject: History of Chitral
- Published: 1921
- Publication place: British India, Bombay
- Media type: (Hardback)
- Pages: 484
- Preceded by: Safarnameh-i-Hindustan.
- Followed by: Ferqai-i-Batiniya

The Tarikh-i-Chitral (lit. History of Chitral) is a work compiled and finalized in 1921 by Mirza Muhammad Ghufran on the order of Mehtar Shuja ul-Mulk (r. 1895–1936). Originally written in 1892 as Mukhtasar Tarikh-i-Chitral (lit. Short history of Chitral), its second version was completed in Persian between 1911 and 1919, with its publication following in the year 1921 in Bombay, India. After its publication, Mehtar Shuja ul-Mulk ordered the burning of all copies of the book.

This book remained clandestinely in Chitral until the author's son, Ghulam Murtaza, recovered a copy and together with Wazir Ali Shah used it as a reference to compile the Nayi Tarikh-i-Chitral (lit. New history of Chitral) in 1962.

== Nayi Tarikh-i-Chitral ==
The Nayi Tarikh-i-Chitral is an Urdu translation of the original Tarikh-i-Chitral albeit with considerable additions based on the notes of Mehtar Nasir ul-Mulk (r. 1936–1943). The book revises and significantly enlarges the narrative of the original Tarikhi-Chitral based on the additional research of Sir Nasir ul-Mulk.

== Tarikh-i-Chitral of Munshi Azizuddin ==
An unrelated work on history of Chitral, albeit depending on the work of Mirza Ghufran, also titled Tarikh-i-Chitral, was completed and published by Munshi Muhammad Azizuddin in 1897 in Urdu.

== See also ==
- Shahnamah-i-Chitral
