= Burhan-ud-Din (Indian National Army officer) =

- Born: 1 January 1914; Chitral
- Died: 1996 (aged 82)
- Education: Prince of Wales Royal Indian Military College
- Relatives: Sir Shuja ul-Mulk (father)
- Military career
- Allegiance: British Raj (1936–1942); Free India (1942–1945); Pakistan (1947–?)
- Branch: (British Raj) British Indian Army; Royal Indian Air Force; Azad Hind Fauj; Pakistan Army
- Unit: Chitral scouts
- Conflicts: World War II; Indo-Pakistani War of 1947

Burhan-ud-Din (1914–1996) (Urdu: برھان الدین) of Chitral was a veteran of the Indian National Army. Burhan-ud-Din was the son of Mehtar Shuja ul-Mulk, the ruler of Chitral. He was by far the most famous Chitrali as a result of his service in the Indian National Army under Subhas Chandra Bose during World War II.

He later served with the Chitral Scouts alongside the Pakistan Army in Chilas in the Indo-Pakistani War of 1947–1948.

== Early career ==
He was educated at the Islamia College in Peshawar and then the Prince of Wales Royal Indian Military College in India.

He passed the military entrance exam and went to the Indian Military Academy at Dehradun. He was commissioned as a Second Lieutenant on the Special List on 15 July 1936 and was attached to the 1st battalion The Kings Own Royal Regiment at Madras from 20 August 1936. He was later accepted for the Indian Army and joined the 5th battalion, 10th Baluch Regiment on 20 August 1937, stationed at Peshawar on the North-West Frontier.

His date of commission as a Second Lieutenant was antedated to 1 September 1935 and he was promoted Lieutenant on 1 December 1937.

He was attached to the Royal Indian Air Force from 1939 to 1941 before he reverted to the Indian Army. He excelled at handling the signature biplanes of the time, the Westland Wapiti and the Tiger Moth. He was transferred to the 2nd battalion, 10th Baluch Regiment. The battalion sailed from India for Singapore on 28 October 1940 and landed there on 11 November 1940.

During the battle of Singapore in February 1942 he was a Lieutenant serving with "B" Company. He was taken prisoner of war at the fall of Singapore on 15 February 1942. After being taken prisoner of war he volunteered for the Indian National Army.

His brother was Major Mata-Ul-Mulk, Fateh-e-Skardu, Governor of Shoghore, born on 10 February 1918, got education from Prince of Wales Royal Indian Military College, Dehradun. Commissioned as 2nd Lieutenant on 15 July 1938, he got promotion as Lieutenant on 28 November 1940. Served as captain in World War II at Malaya & Singapore on 20 June1941. He joined the Indian National Army and got commissioned as the Reinforcement Commandant in the Subhash Chandra bose-led Indian National Army on 15 February 1943, thus, after the surrender, he was made Prisoner of War and captured. He also headed Chitral Body Guard Force 1946 as Colonel. He was made Prisoner of War again and arrested and imprisoned in Peshawar during 1948–1950. Lived the rest of his life in his ancestral Fort at Shoghore near Garamchashma, and died on 8 February 2002.

== World War II ==
By 1944, Burhan-ud-Din was one of three IOC's of the Indian National Army. The Indian National Army was formed from Indian soldiers who were fighting for the British against the Japanese. They were captured by the Japanese and they were given a choice: Join the workers who were building the Death Railway including The Bridge on the River Kwai, or take up arms and fight against the British on the side of the Japanese. Burhan-ud-Din became one of the commanders of the group who opted not to build the Bridge Over the River Kwai.

When Rangoon fell to the British on 3 May 1945, Burhan-ud-Din was captured the same day and placed under arrest. He was charged with a wartime atrocity. Many men under his command had often left their posts to go into Rangoon in search of women, often not to return for several days. Burhan-ud-Din, a deeply religious man, was offended by this practice, so he had five of his soldiers rounded up in Rangoon, brought back, and flogged as deserters. One of them, whose name was Joga Singh, died during the flogging. When the British captured the Indian National Army they were naturally anxious to put some of their leaders on trial.

Burhan-ud-Din was ultimately tried in a Military Court – presided by then Brigadier Kodandera M. Cariappa – later Commander in Chief Chief of the Indian Army. Cariappa's court sentenced Burhan to seven years rigorous imprisonment in 1946. Following pronouncement of his sentence it is said that Brigadier Cariappa, who was heading the military court, walked over and shook hands with Burhan-ud-Din. It was stated in the charge-sheet that Burhan-ud-Din had waged war against the King.

Meanwhile, a bill containing the provisions of Lord Mountbattens plan of 3 June 1947, was introduced in the British Parliament and passed as the Indian Independence Act 1947. The Act laid down detailed measures for the partition of British India and speedy transfer of political powers to the new governments of India and Pakistan. This incident paved the way of release for the prisoners. Burhan and his co-convicts were released on 13 August 1947 and their sentences were nullified. After his release, he immediately returned to Chitral.

== Death ==
The circumstances of his death in 1996 are controversial. There is no agreement whether the gunshot wound which killed him in 1996 was an accident, self-inflicted or if somebody shot him.

== New developments ==
The grandson of Burhan-ud-Din has won a suit before the Supreme Court of Pakistan and ordered hundreds of villagers to vacate a village in Chitral. The dispute over the land of Seen village between its residents and Burhan-ud-Din has been heard in various courts of law for the last 37 years and the apex courts has given its verdict in favour of the latter.
