= Muhammad Ghufran =

- Born: 1857; Chitral
- Died: 1926 (aged 68–69); Chitral

Academic work
- Main interests: History, Islamic philosophy, Islamic theology
- Notable works: Tarikh-e-Chitral; Tashrih-ul-Aqawil; Durjul Ali-fi-Sharhul Amali; Hawashi Fiqah-i-Akber; Towzih-ul-Mowlaiya; Tarikh-i-Khalafi-i-Rashideen; Safarnameh-i-Hindustan; Ferqai-i-Batiniya; Khodnawisht

Mirza Muhammad Ghufran (c. 1857 – c. 1926) was a prominent Scholar, historiographer and poet from Chitral. He was a witness to Chitral's turbulent history in the late 19th century. His compilations on events of the time are considered one of the most authentic and authoritative sources.
