= Chitral Fort =

18th-century fortification in Khyber Pakhtunkhwa, Pakistan

- قلعہ چترال
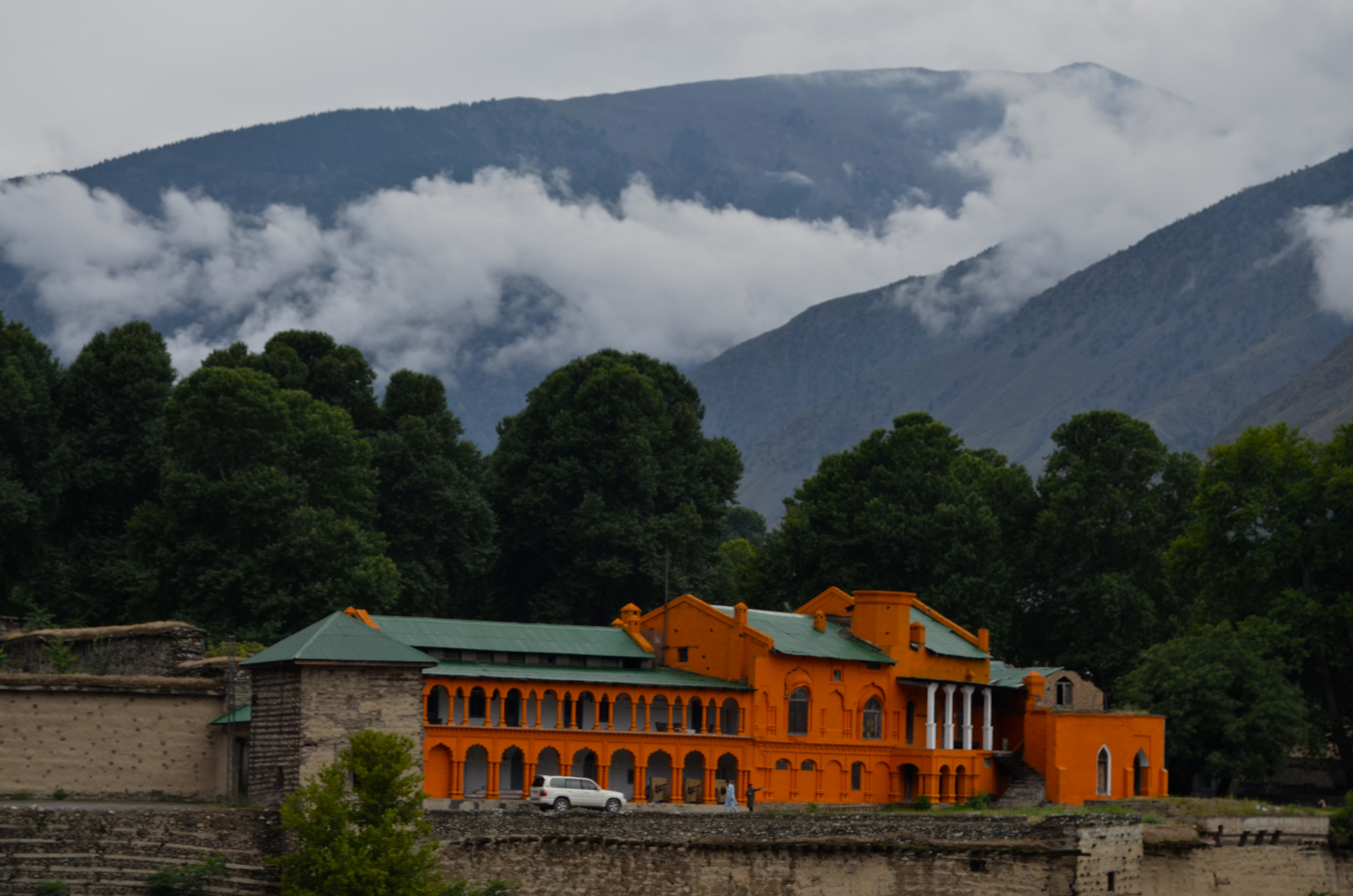
- Chitral Fort, Chitral
- Interactive map of the Chitral Fort area

General information
- Type: Castle
- Location: Lower Chitral, Khyber Pakhtunkhwa, Pakistan, Pakistan
- Coordinates: 35.8551°N 71.7917°E
- Owner: Government of Khyber Pakhtunkhwa

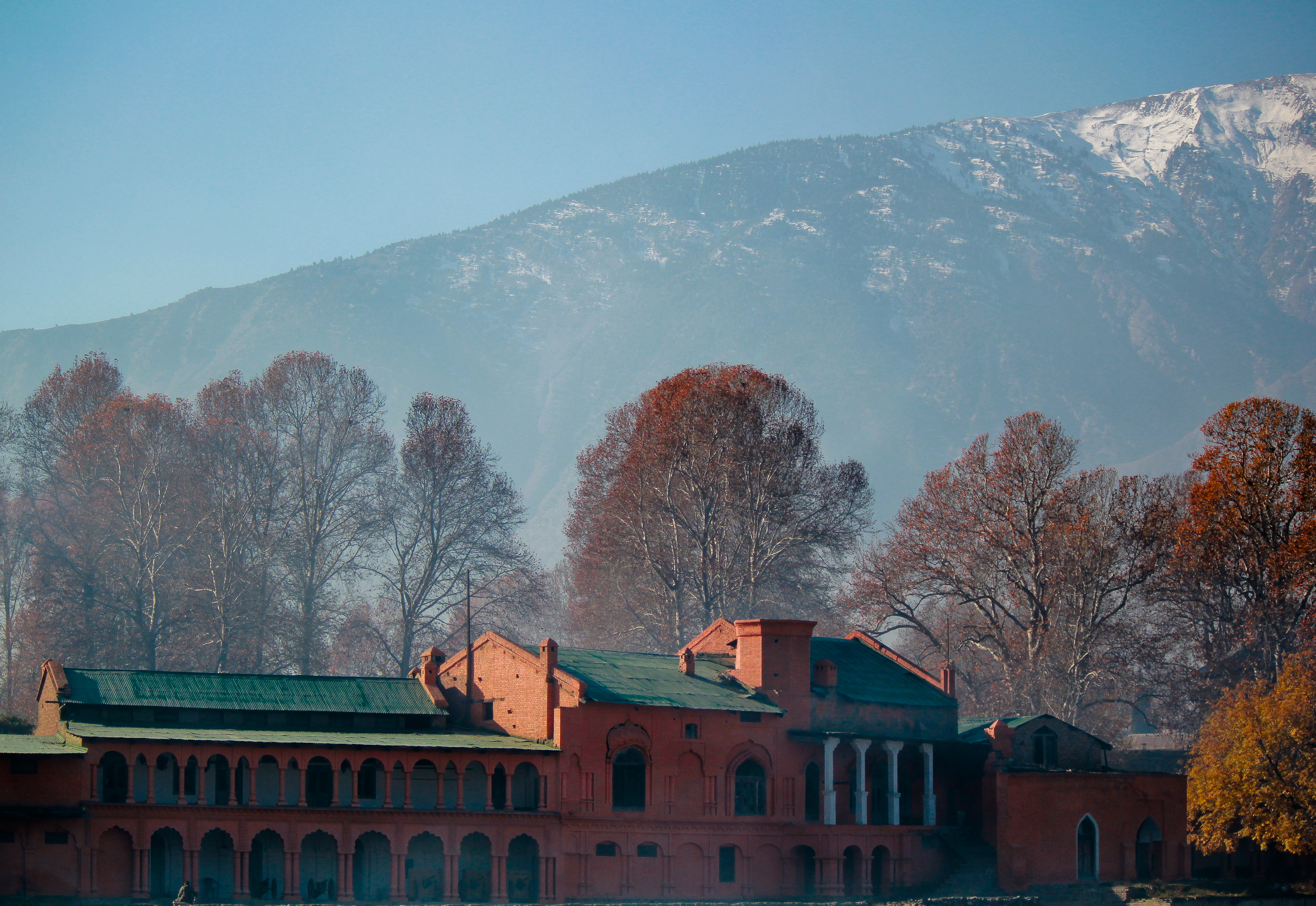
Chitral Fort, the old state rooms built during the reign of Nasir-ul-Mulk.

The Chitral Fort, also known as Chitral Palace, is a fortified palace in Chitral town, Khyber Pakhtunkhwa, Pakistan. it is situated on the banks of the Chitral River. The fort has a commanding position on the river and is believed to have been built in 1774 during the reign of Mohtaram Shah Katur II and restored in 1911 by His Highness Sir Shuja ul-Mulk. The compound used to house the barracks of the guards of Mehtar of Chitral.

The fort was declared as the personal property of the last ruler of Chitral following the merger of Chitral State in 1969. It is now occupied by the current ceremonial Mehtar, Fateh-ul-Mulk Ali Nasir who has renovated the old Darbar Hall and state rooms following damage sustained during the earthquake of 2015.

== Chitral Expedition ==
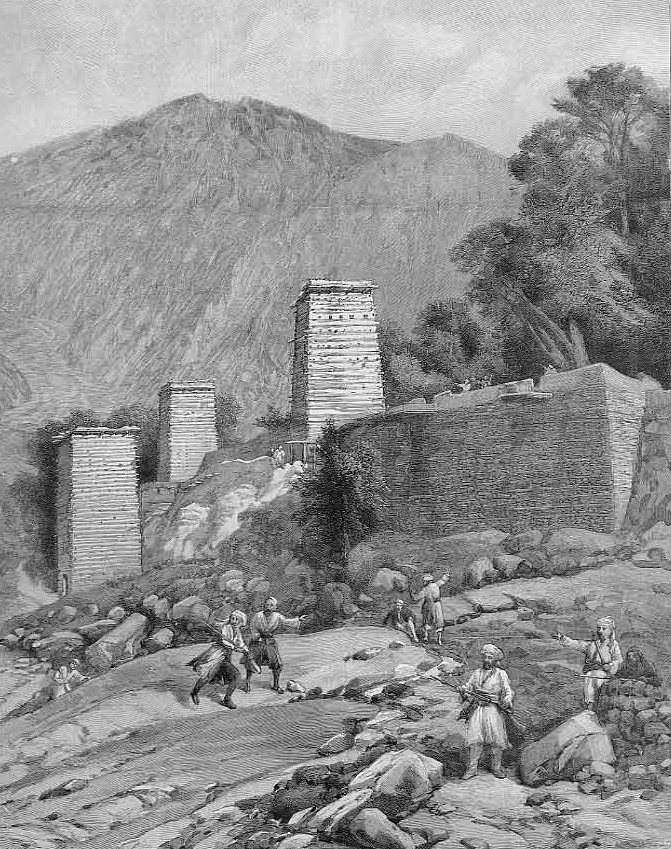
Chitral Fort in 1895

The Chitral Expedition was a military expedition in 1895 sent by the British authorities to relieve the fort which was under siege after a local coup. After the death of the old ruler, power changed hands several times. An intervening British force of about 400 men was besieged in the fort until it was relieved by two expeditions, a small one from Gilgit and a larger one from Peshawar.

== See also ==
- Chitral Valley
- Chitral (princely state)
- List of forts in Pakistan
