= Asmar, Afghanistan =

Asmar اسمار
- Village
- Location within Afghanistan
- Coordinates: 35.0339°N 71.3583°E
- Country: Afghanistan
- Province: Kunar
- District: Bar Kunar
- Elevation: 983 m (3,225 ft)
- Time zone: UTC+4:30 (AFT)

Asmar (Pashto: اسمار) is a town in the northeastern Kunar Province of Afghanistan, which serves as the district center of Bar Kunar District. It is located on the Kunar River.

== History ==
Before the signing of Durand Line Agreement, Asmar formed a part of Kingdom of Chitral. It was claimed by Emir Abdur Rahman Khan in the 19th century as a part of Kunar, and Chitral was deprived of the territory in 1892.

During the Third Anglo-Afghan War in 1919, the area was part of the Chatral front of the war where the tribes of the area were led to victory over the British Raj by Ghazi Mir Zaman Khan.

During the 1980s Soviet war in Afghanistan, the Afghan mujahideen used Asmar as one of their escape routes to neighboring North-West Frontier Province in Pakistan. It was recently occupied by the NATO forces, mainly by the United States Armed Forces. After their withdrawal from the country, the area returned to the control of the Islamic Emirate of Afghanistan.

== Demographics ==
The exact population of Asmār is unknown. But according to the GeoNames geographical database, the total population is around 15,708 people. Most of them are ordinary farmers and laborers. Agriculture is their main source of income.

=== Ethnic groups ===
The inhabitants of Asmar are ethnic Pashtuns, with a small population of Nuristanis. The Pashtun tribes living in Asmar include the following:

- Ul-Mulk
- Mamund
- Salarzi
- Shinwari

== See also ==
- Tourism in Afghanistan
- Valleys of Afghanistan
