= Lowari Pass =

Mountain pass in Khyber Pakhtunkhwa, Pakistan

Lowari Pass درہ لواری
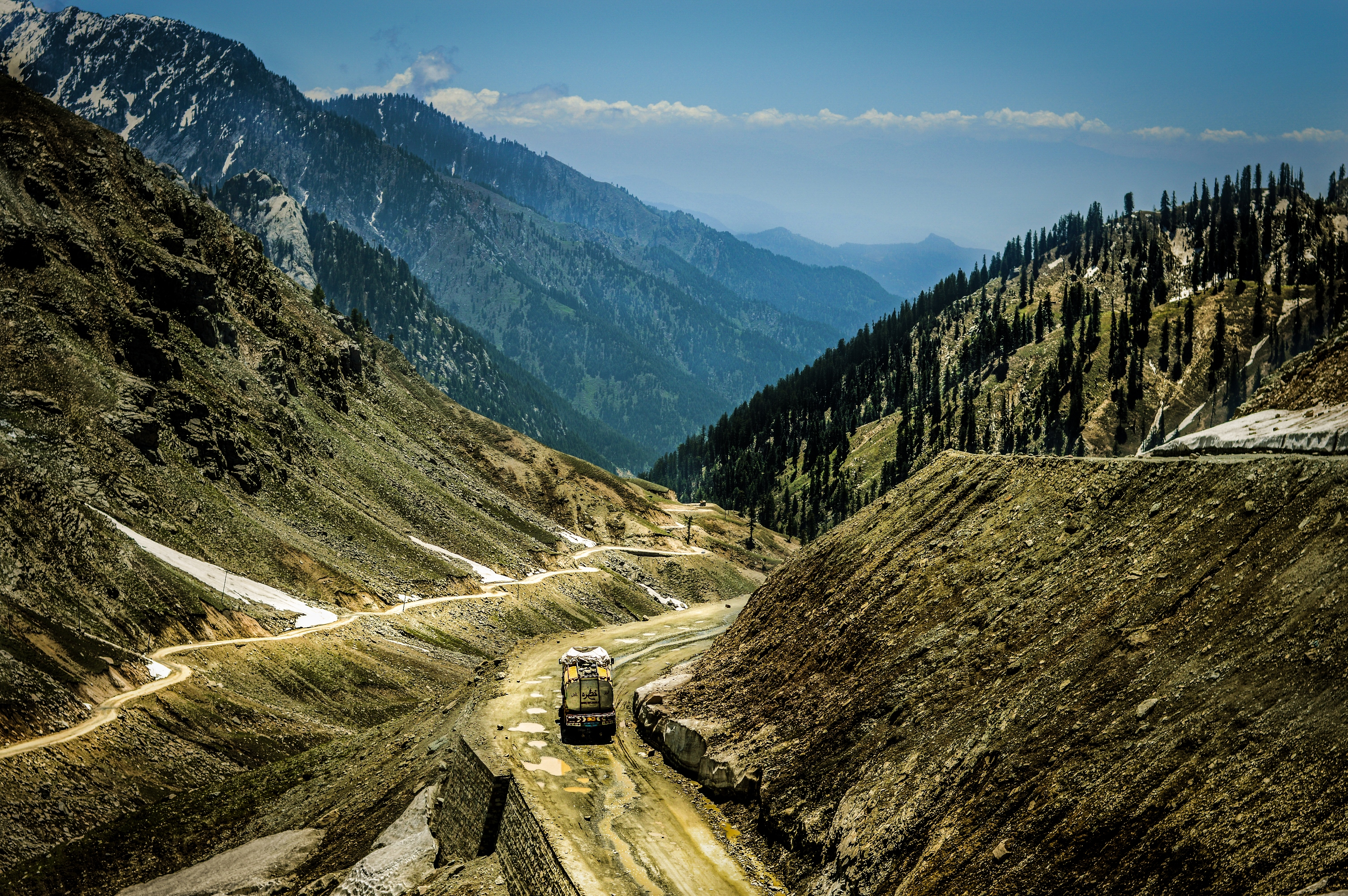
- Prior to the construction of the Lowari Tunnel, vehicles had to traverse the pass by ascending via a dangerous roadway

- Location within Pakistan
- Elevation: 3,118 m (10,230 ft)

Location
- Location: Pakistan
- Range: Hindukush Mountains
- Coordinates: 35°21′06″N 71°48′01″E

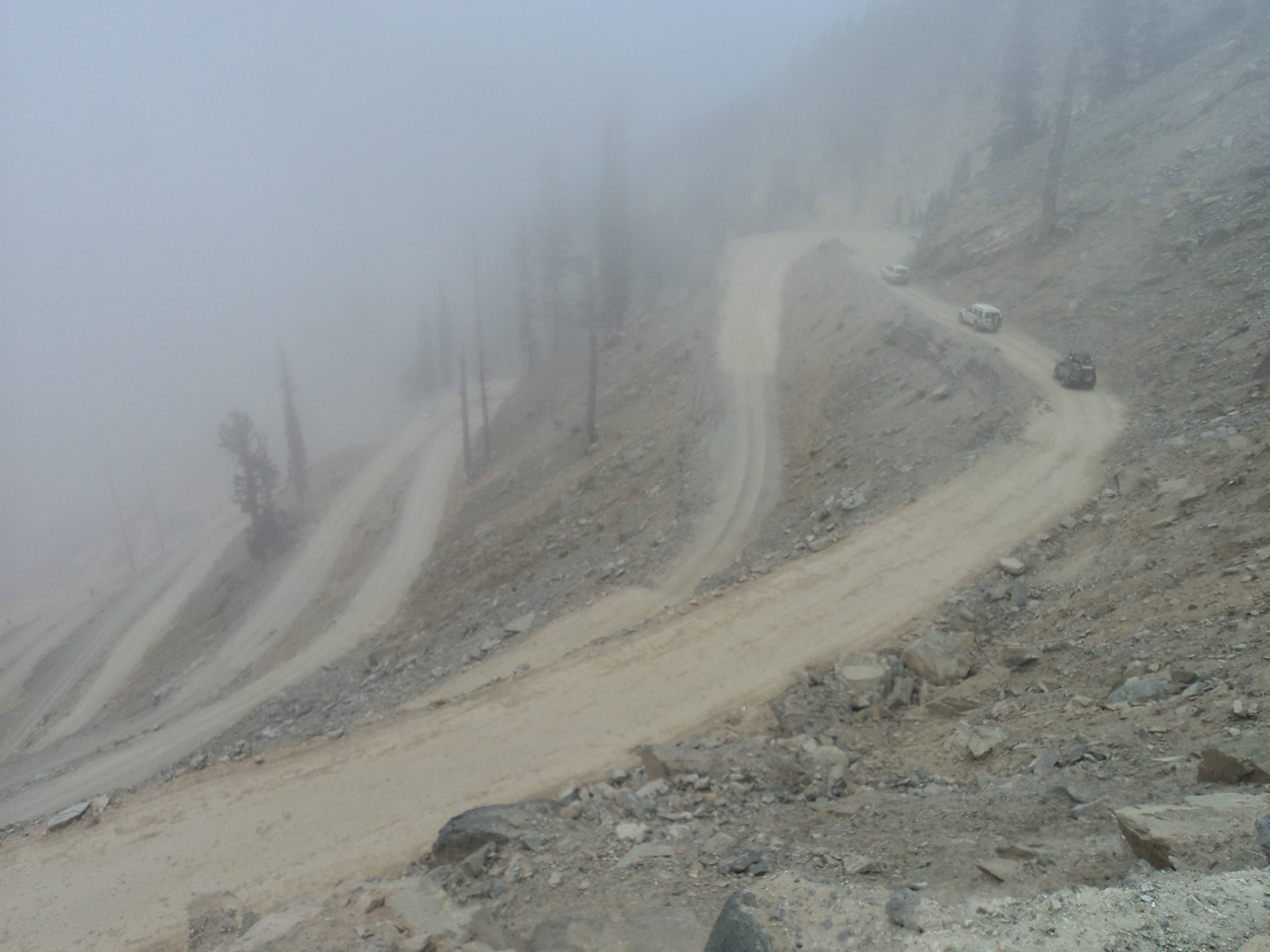
Dusty Lowari Top

Lowari Pass (Urdu: درہ لواری), or Lowari Top, (el. 10,230 ft.) is a high mountain pass, connecting the regions of Chitral and Upper Dir District within the Khyber-Pakhtunkhwa province of Pakistan. Lowari Pass is a relatively low pass, by far the lowest pass to enter Chitral.

Lowari Top experiences a seasonal closure due to heavy snow accumulation, rendering it impassable for vehicular transportation. This closure typically extends from the latter part of November to the ending days of May each year. The Pass entail inherent risks. A significant concern may be the imminent threat posed by deadly avalanche, which can occur abruptly and without warning. This is dangerous, as there are high mountains on each side of Lowari Top.

Several people traversing the Pass in winters become the victims of avalanche fatalities. Their bodies are buried under the snow and it is only when the summer comes and the snow melts that their bodies are found.

Nevertheless, Lowari Top remains popular because it is the shortest route from Chitral to Peshawar. The other way would be down the Kunar River to Jalalabad through hostile Afghan territory, or the much longer route across Shandur Top to Gilgit.

== Location and history ==
Lowari Top crosses the Hindu Raj Mountains, a spur of the higher Hindu Kush. On the Chitral side of Lowari Top are the people of Ashret, who speak the Palula language and were assigned by the Mehtar of Chitral to be the guardians of Lowari Top.

On the Dir side reside Khowars, some of whom make their living as porters carrying loads across Lowari Top.

In 1954, the Mehtar of Chitral was killed when his airplane crashed into Lowari Top.

The word "Top" is believed not to be the English word "top" but a word from an ancient language no longer spoken there.

The Lowari Top is one of the four major mountain passes to enter Chitral. The others are the Dorah Pass from Badakshan in Afghanistan, Shandur Top from Gilgit, and Broghol from the Wakhan Corridor in Afghanistan.

== Lowari Tunnel ==
To provide an alternate all-weather route to connect the region, the construction of the Lowari Tunnel was started in September 1975. However, the project was abandoned approximately one year later due to shortage of funds. Work resumed in 2005 by the South Korean company Sambo, until the scarcity of funds forced the construction to be paused in 2009. The construction resumed in its third phase in 2014, after which it was finally completed and inaugurated in July 2017.

The tunnel is functional as of December 2025, and comprises over 8.5 kilometres in length.

== Books ==
- The Gilgit Game by John Keay (1985) ISBN 0-19-577466-3
- The Kafirs of the Hindukush (1896) Sir George Scott Robertson.
