= Kingdom of Chitral =

Former princely state of British India and Pakistan

Coordinates: 35°50′16″N 71°47′02″E

- State flag Emblem

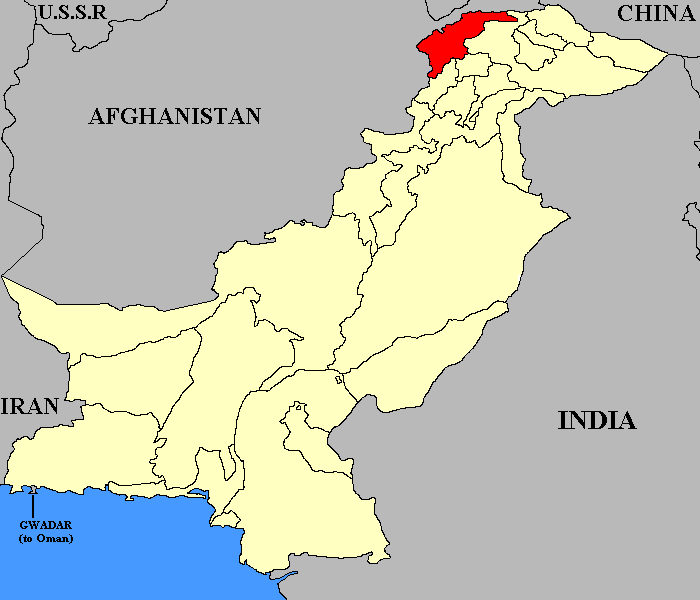
- Chitral highlighted in the Dominion of Pakistan in 1947
- Capital: Chitral
- Official languages: Persian (official, literary, and administrative language); Khowar (court, mother tongue, literary language)
- Government: Monarchy
- Mehtar

Area
  - Total: 5,737 sq mi (14,860 km^{2})

Population
  - 1951 census: 1,05,724
Preceded by	Succeeded by
Chagatai Khanate	West Pakistan
- Today part of: Pakistan

Chitrāl (Khowar: ݯھیترار; Persian: چترال) was a kingdom in the Hindu Kush region, in the northwest of South Asia, existing from 17th century until its abolition in 1969. Between 1885 and 1947, it was one of the princely states in alliance with British Raj, after which it became a princely state of Pakistan. The area it covered is now part of the Upper and Lower Chitral districts in Khyber Pakhtunkhwa province of Pakistan.

During the reign of Mehtar Aman ul-Mulk (r. 1857 – 1892), the kingdom extended from Asmar and Bashgal Valley (in present-day Kunar and Nuristan provinces of Afghanistan, respectively) to Punial in the Gilgit Valley. It was an independent monarchy until 1891, when it was agreed that the British be consulted in all matters of foreign policy and defense, in exchange for an increased yearly subsidy to the Mehtar. After the Chitral Expedition in 1895, the British hold became stronger, but the internal administration remained in the hands of the Mehtar. In 1947, British India was partitioned and Chitral opted to accede to Pakistan. After accession, it finally became an administrative district of Pakistan in 1969.

== History ==
=== Early historiography ===
Since the early 19th century, local chroniclers have been documenting the history of Chitral and are considered the main source on the subject. First known of them is the Shahnamah-i-Chitral of Baba Siyar, the court historian of Shah Kator II (r. 1788–1838), written in the early 1800s. The Nai Tarikh-i-Chitral (lit. 'The new history of Chitral') written by Ghulam Murtaza, a son of the court historian of Shuja ul-Mulk during the British period, has come to be seen as the official historiography of Chitral, and is largely accepted by international scholarship. However, it has been criticized on weak chronological ground, as it traced back the advent of Islam in Chitral around the 7th century, and sought to legitimise the Kator rule by anticipating its beginning.

==== Kafir period ====
According to the account, the history of Chitral is divided into three main periods: the Kafir period, the Rais period, and the Kator period. It describes the arrival of Islam in Chitral in the 7th century by an Arab army that defeated a local king named Bahman Kohistani. After a gap of five centuries, it describes upper Chitral under Sumalik of the Trakhan dynasty, which ruled Gilgit, while lower Chitral was ruled by Kalasha rulers Bulasing and Rajawai.

==== Rais dynasty ====
The Kafir period came to an end in 1320, accordingly, when a foreign chief named Shah Nadir Rais, presumably from Turkestan, arrived and founded the Rais dynasty, which lasted from 1531 to 1574. The Tarikh-i-Gilgit (lit. 'The history of Gilgit') of Shah Rais Khan (written 1941) makes him a member of the Trakhan dynasty of Gilgit. Shah Nasir is described as the eighth of the nine Rais rulers. They were ousted by Mohtaram Shah Kator, who reigned from 1595 to 1630, coming to power due to a public backlash against Rais rule after Shah Mahmud Rais, the son of Shah Nasir, ascended to the throne. The defeat of Shah Mahmud by Mohtaram’s son Sangin Ali II in 1660 marks the final establishment of the Kator dynasty, which lasted until modern times.

==== Alternative reconstruction by Wolfgang Holzwarth ====
Wolfgang Holzwarth has conducted a recent investigation that challenges the account's reconstruction of the Rais period, claiming that it fails to acknowledge the spread of Islam in Chitral and Gilgit. According to Holzwarth, the Chagatai Khanate brought Islam to the region in the early 16th century, establishing sub-centers in Mastuj and Yasin. He cites the successful military expeditions led by Mirza Haidar from Yarkand into the Hindu Kush between 1520 and 1550 as evidence. The first independent Muslim ruler in Chitral was likely Shah Babur, who came in a second Islamic wave from Badakshan. He has been mentioned in the Bahr al-Asrar, a 17th century court chronicle from the Uzbek Khanate of Balkh, as ruling Chitral in 1620. The 17th-century anonymous Tarikh-i-Kashgar further claims that Shah Babur became a tributary of Khanate of Kashgar in 1641 following an attack by Abdullah Khan Chughtai. His son, Shah Rais, is said to have been ruling in Yasin around 1660, according to Shigarnama (written 17th century). The next ruler known from sources outside Chitral is Shah Mahmud, who is recorded in Chinese Manchu annals of 1764 to have conquered Chitral from the Oirat Mongols who replaced the Chagatai rulers in 1678. He ruled from 1713–20. Shah Mahmud can reasonably be identified as Shah Mahmud Rais, son of Shah Nasir, who was forced to flee to Badakhshan by Mohtaram Shah I, the first Kator ruler of Chitral, but eventually regained his throne with the help of a large army from Kashgar and Yarkand. In the decisive battle fought at Danin, Shah Khushwaqt, brother of Shah Mohtaram, was killed, and the other Kator princes fled from Chitral. The battle of Danin is likely the same event reported in the Manchu annals and the Oirat Mongol invasion of Chitral mentioned by Biddulph. Shah Mahmud's counterattack, dated 1630 by the Nai Tarikh-i-Chitral, should be set around the 18th century instead.

=== Kator dynasty ===
The investigation by Wolfgang Holzwarth indicates that Kator rule may not have been established in Chitral until the mid-18th century, as documented in the Manchu annals. Holzwarth also suggests that the first seven rulers of the Rais period may be a recent invention, as there is no mention of them in any known source or oral tradition. The last three rulers are likely historical, and conflicts between the Kator and Khushwaqt branches of the same dynasty are described in more detail in the Nai Tarikh-i-Chitral after the defeat of the Rais. Despite this, the chronology of events in the Nai Tarikh-i-Chitral remains unreliable, and there is an effort to stretch the Kator rule back to the early 17th century, even though the first confirmed Kator ruler, Mohtaram Shah I, likely ruled in the early 18th century. Dynastic wars also continued to occur between close relatives of the Kator family to gain the throne.

=== Early Kator rulers ===
According to Kalasha oral traditions, the Kator dynasty descended from a pre-Islamic shaman tribe. As per the account given by Ahmad Hasan Dani, Shah Kator I was a son of a certain Sang-e-Ali (or Sangin Ali, سنگِ علی). He came to power by usurping throne from the Rais ruler who fled to Badakhshan. After some time Shah Mahmud bin Shah Nasir returned and retook his throne from Kators, forcing them to relocate to Mastuj and Yasin. The struggle between the two dynasties continued for a long time. Shah Kator I was succeeded by Sangin Ali II, who invaded Gilgit to avenge the death of his father. He was killed while hunting and was succeeded by his brother Muhammad Ghulam. He was too killed two years later, and was followed by a rapid succession of rulers. In 1775, Farmurz Shah Khushwaqt was enthroned. He expanded the kingdom and inflicted final defeat over Rais under Shah Abdul Qadir bin Mahmud, forcing him to flee to Badakhshan. In 1778 (or 1788) Mohtarim Shah II Kator occupied Chitral. After a long struggle against his kins, the Khushwaqts of Yasin, he became supreme in Chitral in 1833. He died in 1838 and was succeeded by his fifth son Shah Afzal II. Shah Afzal II died in 1853 and was succeeded by his son Mohtarim Shah III, who was known for his bravery and generosity. Mohtarim Shah III was in turn succeeded by his brother Aman ul-Mulk in 1857.

=== Aman ul-Mulk (1857–1892) ===
Aman ul-Mulk, Shah Afzal II's second son, succeeded his brother in 1857. After a brief dispute with Kashmir, in which he laid siege to the garrison at Gilgit and briefly held the Punial Valley, he accepted a treaty with the maharaja of Kashmir in 1877. Aman ul-Mulk was a strong ruler and no serious attempt to challenge his authority was made during his reign by the British. During the course of his rule Aman ul-Mulk encountered many British officers, some of whom have noted him in the following words:

His bearing was royal, his courtesy simple and perfect, he had naturally the courtly Spanish grace of a great heredity noble

— Algernon Durand

Chitral, in fact, had its parliament and democratic constitution. For just as the British House of Commons is an assembly, so in Chitral, the Mehtar, seated on a platform and hedged about with a certain dignity, dispensed justice or law in sight of some hundreds of his subjects, who heard the arguments, watched the process of debate, and by their attitude in the main decided the issue. Such 'durbars' were held on most days of the week in Chitral, very often twice in the day, in the morning and again at night. Justice compels me to add that the speeches in the Mahraka were less long and the general demeanour more decorous than in some western assemblies.

— Lord Curzon, the Viceroy of India,

In 1885–86, Chitral was visited by the British Lockhart mission, and in 1889, after the establishment of an agency in Gilgit, the British gave Aman ul-Mulk a yearly subsidy of 6,000 rupees, along with some rifles. Chitral came under British suzerainty in 1891, when an agreement was concluded that stipulated that the British were to be consulted in all matters of foreign policy and defense, and in return the Mehtar's yearly subsidy was increased to 12,000 rupees. For forty years his was the chief personality on the frontier. After a relatively long reign, Aman ul-Mulk died peacefully in 1892.

==== Wars of Succession ====
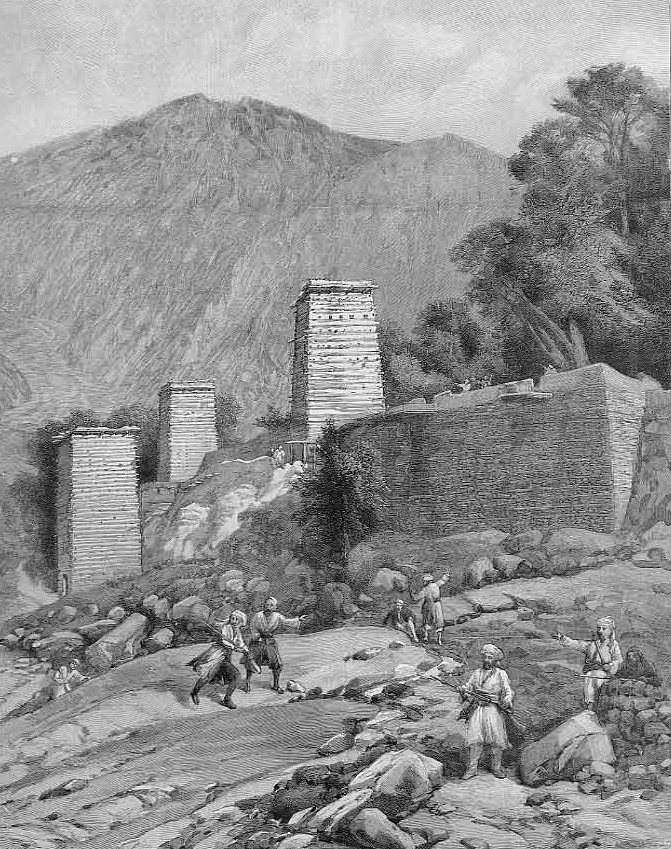
The Siege and Relief of Chitral 1895

Without any law of succession, a long war of succession ensued between Aman ul-Mulk's sons after his death. Aman's younger son, Afzal ul-Mulk, proclaimed himself ruler during the absence of his elder brother. He then proceeded to eliminate several of his brothers, potential contenders to his throne. This initiated a war of succession, which lasted three years. Afzal ul-Mulk was killed by his uncle, Sher Afzal, the stormy petrel of Chitral and a long-time thorn in his father's side. He held Chitral for under a month, then fled into Afghan territory upon Nizam ul-Mulk's return. Nizam, Afzal ul-Mulk's eldest brother and the rightful heir, then succeeded in December of the same year. At about that time, Chitral came under the British sphere of influence following the Durand Line Agreement, which delineated the border between Emirate of Afghanistan and the British Indian Empire. Nizam ul-Mulk's possessions in Kafiristan and the Kunar Valley were recognised as Afghan territory and he was forced to cede them to Abdur Rahman Khan. Within a year, Nizam was himself murdered by his another ambitious younger brother, Amir ul-Mulk. In 1895 the British agent in Gilgit Agency, Sir George Scott Robertson was besieged in Chitral Fort for 48 days, and was finally relieved by two British Forces, one marching from Gilgit and the other from Nowshera. The approach of the Chitral Expedition, a strong military force composed of British and Kashmiri troops, prompted Amir to eventually surrender. His ally Umra Khan fled to Jandul.

=== Shuja ul-Mulk (1895–1936) ===
The British had decided to support the interests of Shuja ul-Mulk, the youngest legitimate son of Aman ul-Mulk, and the only one remained uninvolved in the political upheaval. After installing the young Mehtar, British and Kashmiri forces endured the famous defence against a seven-week siege by Sher Afzal and the Umra Khan of Jandul. Although Shuja ul-Mulk was now firmly established as ruler, the Dogras annexed Yasin, Kuh Ghizer and Ishkoman. Dogra suzerainty over Chitral ended in 1911, and Chitral became a Salute state in direct relations with the British. Mastuj, removed from the Mehtar's jurisdiction in 1895, was also restored to him within two years.

Shuja reigned for forty-one years, during which Chitral enjoyed an unprecedented period of internal peace. He journeyed outside of the Hindu Kush region, visiting various parts of India and meeting a number of fellow rulers, as well making the Hajj to Arabia and meeting the King ibn Saud of Arabia. He was invited to the Delhi Durbar in January 1903. Shuja ul-Mulk sent his sons abroad to acquire a modern education. The princes travelled to far-off places such as Aligarh and Dehradun accompanied by the sons of notables who were schooled at state expense. He supported the British during the Third Anglo-Afghan War in 1919, during which four of his sons and the Chitral State Bodyguard served in several actions guarding the border against invasion.

=== Mehtars after Shuja ul-Mulk (1936–1966) ===
Nasir ul-Mulk succeeded his father in 1936. He received a modern education, becoming a noted poet and scholar in his own right. He took a deep interest in military, political and diplomatic affairs, and spent much of his time on improving the administration. Dying without a surviving male heir in 1943, his successor was his immediate younger brother, Muzaffar ul-Mulk. Also a man with a military disposition, his reign witnessed the tumultuous events surrounding the Partition of British India. His prompt action in sending in his own Bodyguards to Gilgit was instrumental in securing the territory for Pakistan. His brother Mata ul-Mulk played an instrumental role in the siege and capture of Skardu on 14 August 1948, making Baltistan a part of Dominion of Pakistan.

At the time of the Partition on 15 August 1947, the then Mehtar, Muzaffar ul-Mulk (1901–1949), stated his intention to accede to Pakistan. However, he did not execute an Instrument of Accession until 6 November 1947. This was contentedly accepted by the Government of Pakistan without delay.

The unexpected early death of Muzaffar ul-Mulk saw the succession pass to his relatively inexperienced eldest son, Saif-ur-Rahman, in 1948. Due to certain tensions he was exiled from Chitral by the Government of Pakistan for six years. They appointed a board of administration composed of officials from Chitral and the rest of Pakistan to govern the state in his absence. He died in a plane crash on the Lowari Pass while returning to resume charge of Chitral in 1954.

In 1954 a Supplementary Instrument of Accession was signed and the Chitral Interim Constitution Act was passed whereby the State of Chitral become a federated state of Pakistan. The same year, a powerful advisory council was established on the insistence of the Federal Government of Pakistan, and this continued to hold much power in Chitral until 1966.

Saif ul-Mulk Nasir (1950–2011) nominally succeeded his father at the age of four in 1954. In his name, a Council of regency reigned for the next twelve years, during which Pakistani authority gradually increased over the state. Although installed as a constitutional ruler when he came of age in 1966, Saif ul-Mulk did not enjoy his new status very long. The states of Dir, Chitral and Swat were finally merged through the promulgation of the Dir, Chitral and Swat Administration Regulation of 1969 under General Yahya Khan. In order to reduce the Mehtar's influence, he, like so many other princes in neighbouring India, was invited to represent his country abroad. He served in various diplomatic posts in Pakistan's Foreign Office and prematurely retired from the service as Consul-General in Hong Kong in 1989. He died in 2011, and was succeeded (albeit symbolically) by his son Fateh ul-Mulk Ali Nasir.

== Administration ==
The capital city was Chitral Town. The official language of the state was Persian, used in official correspondence and literature. However, Khowar was the mother tongue of the dynasty as well as majority of population, and a number of works were written in it. The Khowar alphabet was standardized during the kingdom period.

=== Mehtar ===
The ruler's title was Mitar which is pronounced as Mehtar by outsiders. Aman ul-Mulk adopted the Persian style Shahzada for his sons, and the style prevailed from then on. The word Khonza (meaning princess in the Khowar language) was reserved for female members of the Mehtar’s family.

The Mehtar was an influential player in the power politics of the region as he acted as an intermediary between the rulers of Badakhshan, the Yousafzai Pashtuns, the Maharaja of Kashmir and later the Amir of Afghanistan. The Mehtar was the center of all political, economic and social activity in the state. Intimacy with or loyalty to the ruling prince was a mark of prestige among the Mehtar's subjects.

=== Civil administration ===
The Mehtar was the source of all power in the land, the final authority on civil, military and judicial matters. To function effectively, he built an elaborate administrative machinery. From Chitral, the Mehtar maintained control over distant parts of the state by appointing trusted officials. From the Chitral fort, which housed the extended royal family, the Mehtar presided over an elaborate administrative hierarchy. Tribes in Upper Swat, Upper Dir, Kohistan and Kafiristan (present day Nuristan) paid tribute to the Mehtar of Chitral.

=== State flag ===
The state flag of Chitral was triangular in shape and pale green in colour. The wider side of the pennant depicted a mountain, most likely the Terich Mir, the highest peak of Chitral as well as Hindu Kush. In the later Katoor period, this flag served as a symbol of the Mehtar's presence and flew above the Chitral fort. It was hoisted every morning, accompanied by a salute from the State Bodyguard Force, and taken down each evening after another salutation.

=== Residence ===
The Chitral Fort was both fortified residence and the seat of power in the area. It remains the seat of the current ceremonial Mehtar. To the west of the fort is the Royal Mosque, built by Shuja ul-Mulk in 1922. Its pinkish walls and white domes make it one of north Pakistan's most distinctive mosques. The tomb of Mehtar Shuja ul-Mulk is located in a corner of the mosque. The summer residence of the ex-ruler of Chitral is on the hill top above the town at Birmoghlasht.

== List of rulers ==
Following is a list of the rulers of the Kator dynasty with the date of their accession. The historicity and dates of the rulers prior to Mohtarim Shah Kator II (1788–1837) are disputed.

1. Sangeen Ali (I) 1560
2. Shah Muhtarram Shah Kator (I) 1585
3. Sangeen Ali (II) 1655
4. Muhammad Ghulam 1691
5. Shah Alam 1694
6. Shah Muhammad Shafi 1696
7. Shah Faramurd 1717
8. Shah Afzal (I) 1724
9. Shah Fazil 1754
10. Shah Nawaz Khan 1757
11. Shah Khairullah 1761
12. Shah Muhtaram Shah Kator (II) 1788
13. Shah Afzal (II) 1838
14. Shah Muhtarram Shah Kator (III) 1854
15. Aman ul-Mulk 1856
16. Afzal ul-Mulk 1892
17. Sher Afzal 1892
18. Nizam ul-Mulk 1892
19. Amir ul-Mulk 1895
20. Shuja ul-Mulk 1895
21. Nasir ul-Mulk 1936
22. Muzaffar ul-Mulk 1943
23. Saif-ur-Rehman 1949
24. Muhammad Saif-ul-Mulk Nasir 1954
25. Fateh-ul-Mulk Ali Nasir 2011

== See also ==
- Chitral Scouts
- Hunza (princely state)
- Nagar (princely state)
