= List of Chitrali people =

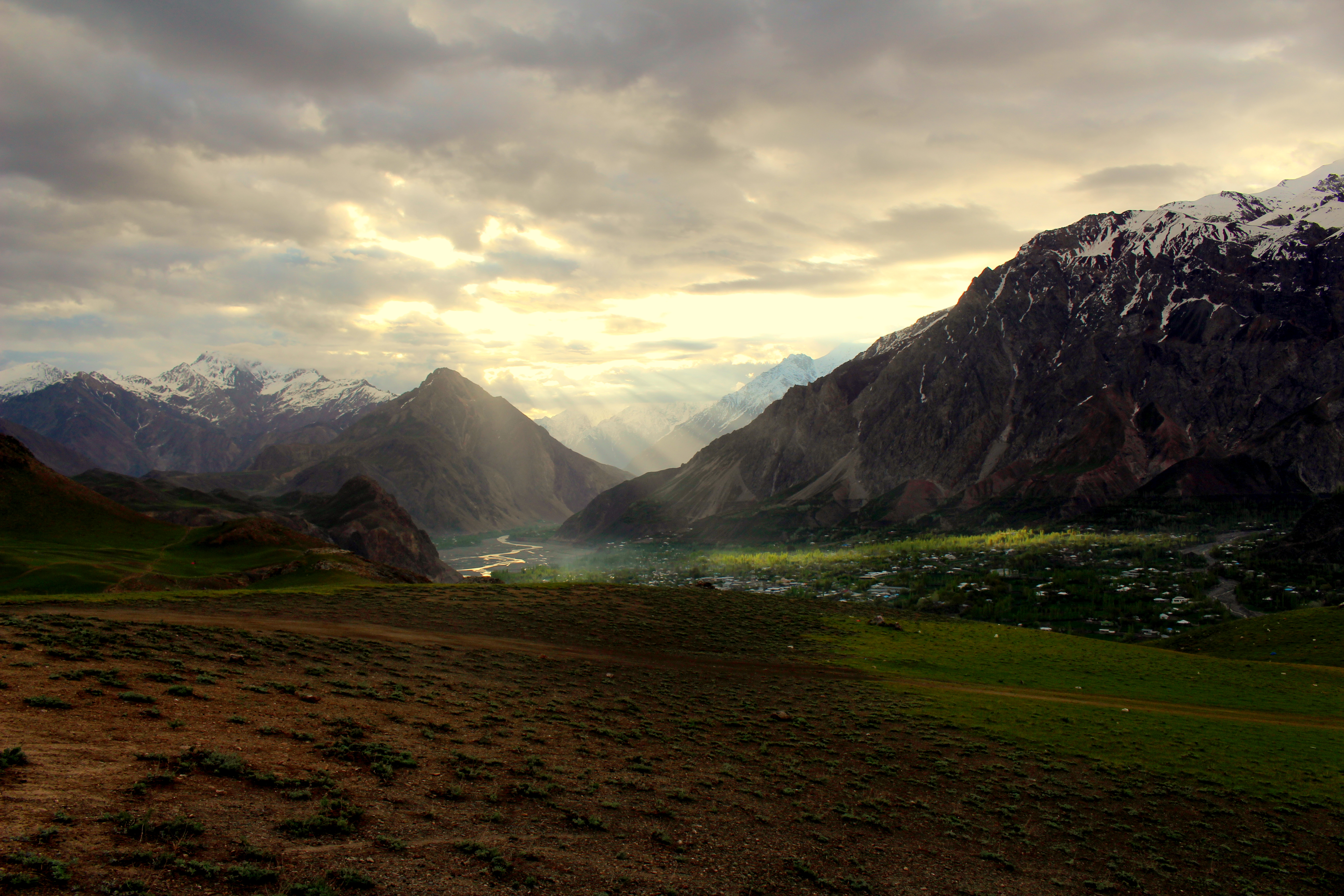
Qaqlasht, an alpine meadow located near Buni in the Upper Chitral District in Khyber Pakhtunkhwa.

The following is a list of notable Chitrali people (also known as Kho people), an Indo-Aryan ethnolinguistic group native to Chitral, Gupis-Yasin and Ghizer districts of Pakistan.

== Activists ==
- Masood ul-Mulk, Pakistani humanitarian and development practitioner

== Authors ==
- Muhammad Ghufran (1857 – 1926), scholar, historiographer and poet
- Muhammad Siyar (1770 – 1840), Khowar-language poet and court chronicler
- Rahima Naz, poet of Urdu and the Khowar languages.

== Military ==
- Burhan-ud-Din (1914 – 1996), a veteran of the Indian National Army
- Mata ul-Mulk (1918 – 2002), known for his role in the First Kashmir War

== Performing art and media ==
- Sana Yousaf (2008 – 2025), Pakistani social media influencer.

== Politicians ==
- Zainul Abideen, member of the Khyber Pakhtunkhwa Assembly
- Abdul Akbar Chitrali, member of the National Assembly of Pakistan
- Bibi Fozia, member of the Khyber Pakhtunkhwa Assembly
- Saleem Khan, member of the Khyber Pakhtunkhwa Assembly
- Shahzada Mohiuddin, provincial minister and member of the National Assembly of Pakistan
- Falak Naz, member of the Senate of Pakistan
- Jafar Ali Shah, member of the National Assembly of Pakistan
- Shahzada Iftikhar Uddin, member of the National Assembly of Pakistan
- Fateh-ul-Mulk Ali Nasir, member of the Khyber Pakhtunkhwa Assembly

== Royalty ==
- Gohar Aman (1809 – 1860), ruler of Yasin, Ghizer and Gilgit
- Aman ul-Mulk (1821 – 1892), the 15th mehtar of Chitral
- Afzal ul-Mulk (1867 – 1892), the 16th mehtar of Chitral
- Sher Afzal (1841 – 1923), the 17th mehtar of Chitral
- Nizam ul-Mulk (1861 – 1895), the 18th mehtar of Chitral
- Amir ul-Mulk (1877 – 1923), the 19th mehtar of Chitral
- Shuja ul-Mulk (1881 – 1936), the 20th mehtar of Chitral
- Nasir ul-Mulk (1887 – 1943), the 21st mehtar of Chitral
- Muzaffar ul-Mulk (1901 – 1949), Mehtar of Chitral who acceeded to Pakistan

== Sportspersons ==
=== Association football ===
- Karishma Ali
- Alamgir Ghazi
- Muhammad Rasool
- Zia Us-Salam

=== Cricket ===
- Muhammad Musa
