= Chitrali =

Chitrali may refer to:

- Chitralis, an ethnic group of Chitral in northern Pakistan
- Chitrali language, also known as Khowar, the Dardic language spoken by the Chitralis
- something from, or related to, the following:
  - Chitral District, a mountainous district in the Khyber-Pakhtunkhwa province of Pakistan
  - Chitral, the city that is the capital of the district
  - Chitral (princely state)
- Chitrali cap
- Chitrali cuisine, refers to the food and cuisine of the Chitrali people
- Chitrali sitar, is a long-necked lute played in northern area, Chitral of Pakistan
- Chitrali (magazine), a defunct weekly magazine in Bangladesh.
- Abdul Akbar Chitrali, Pakistani politician from Chitral

== See also ==
- Chitral (disambiguation)
- Chitrali languages (disambiguation)
- List of Chitrali people
