= Khoshey people =

Khoshey-خوشے
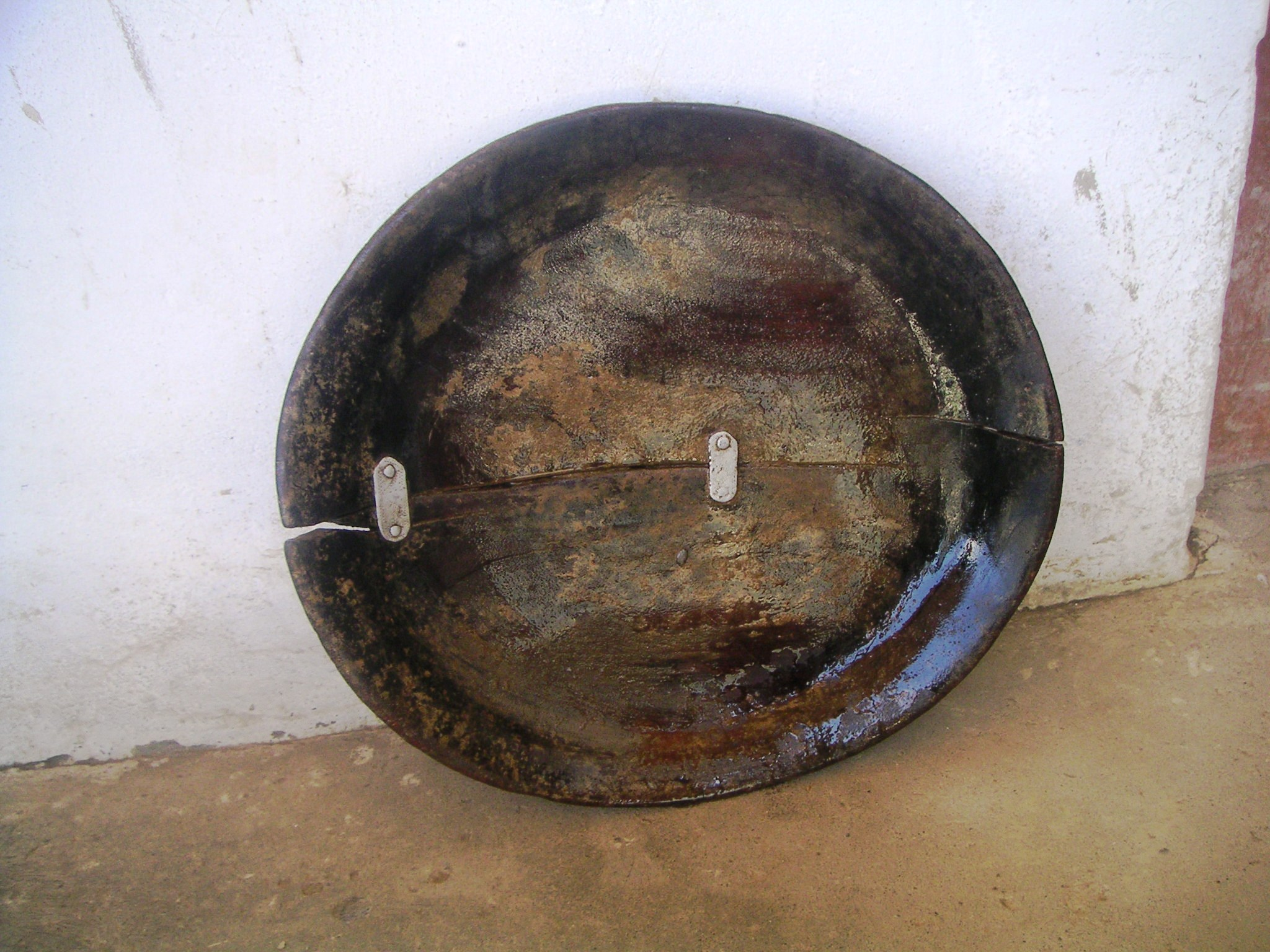
- Wooden utensil used by Khoshey tribe of Chitral

Total population
- ca. 21,000

Regions with significant populations
- Torkhow, Mulkhow, Laspur, Chitral, Drosh, Kalam, Ghizer, Ayon Chitral District, Khyber Pakhtun Khwa, Pakistan

Languages
- Khowar; Urdu or Pashto also understood widely as second languages

Related ethnic groups
- Chitrali

The Khoshey (Khowar: Khow, Chitrali: Khosh Yemeni) are a Kho tribe residing in the Torkhow, Mulkhow, Laspur, Chitral, Drosh, Tirich Mir, Ayon, Chitral District of Khyber-Pakhtunkhwa province of Pakistan and Badakhshan. The Khoshey speak the Khowar language.

== See also ==
- Nursing in Pakistan
