= NA-1 Upper Chitral-cum-Lower Chitral =

Constituency for the National Assembly of Pakistan

NA-1 Upper Chitral-cum-Lower Chitral این اے-۱ چترال بالا-بمع-چترال زیریں
- Constituency for the National Assembly of Pakistan
- District: Upper Chitral; Lower Chitral
- Province: Khyber Pakhtunkhwa
- Electorate: 313,550

Current constituency
- Member: Vacant
- Created from: NA-1 Chitral

NA-1 Upper Chitral-cum-Lower Chitral (Urdu: این اے-۱ چترال بالا-بمع-چترال زیریں) is a constituency for the National Assembly of Pakistan, covering the entire districts of Upper and Lower Chitral.

== Historical composition ==
Previously, it was recognized as NW-15 Chitral from 1970 to 1977 and NA-24 Chitral from 1977 to 1997. In 2002, it was redefined as NA-32 Chitral. Following the 2018 delimitation, the constituency's name was altered to NA-1 Chitral.

== Members of Parliament ==
=== 1977–2002: NA-24 Chitral ===
Election	Member	Party
1977	Muhammad Wali Khan	Pakistan People's Party
1985	Shahzada Mohiuddin	Independent
1988	Nusrat Bhutto	Pakistan People's Party
1990	Shahzada Mohiuddin	Islami Jamhuri Ittihad
1993	Molana Abdur Raheem	Pakistan Islamic Front
1997	Shahzada Mohiuddin	Pakistan Muslim League (N)

=== 2002–2018: NA-32 Chitral ===
Election	Member	Party
2002	Abdul Akbar Chitrali	Muttahida Majlis-e-Amal
2008	Shahzada Mohiuddin	Pakistan Muslim League (Q)
2013	Shahzada Iftikhar Uddin	All Pakistan Muslim League

=== 2018: NA-1 Chitral ===
Election	Member	Party
2018	Abdul Akbar Chitrali	Muttahida Majlis-e-Amal

=== 2024-2025: NA-1 Upper Chitral-cum-Lower Chitral ===
Election	Member	Party
2024	Abdul Latif	PTI

== Election 2024 ==
In the general elections held on 8 February 2024, PTI-backed Independent candidate Abdul Latif won the seat by getting 61,834 votes. He later joined SIC as per party policy.

General election 2024: NA-1 Upper Chitral-cum-Lower Chitral
Party	Candidate	Votes	%	±%
PTI	Abdul Latif (Note: Filed nomination papers as PTI candidate but ECP allowed him to run as an Independent)	61,834	38.16	▲14.75
JUI (F)	Muhammad Talha Mahmood	42,987	26.53	N/A
PPP	Fazali Rabbi	23,723	14.64	▼5.22
PML(N)	Shahzada Iftikhar Uddin	20,007	12.35	▼0.44
JI	Abdul Akbar Chitrali	9,253	5.71	N/A
ANP	Khadija Bibi	2,411	1.49	▲1.49
Others	Others (four candidates)	1,838	1.13	
Valid ballots		1,62,053	97.15	
Rejected ballots		4,755	2.85	
Turnout		1,66,808	53.19	▼7.78
Majority		18,847	11.63	
Registered electors		3,13,550		
PTI gain from JUI (F)				

== Election 2018 ==
General elections were held on 25 July 2018.

Contest overview

Shahzada Iftikhar Uddin previously ran twice from this constituency, first in 2002 on Pakistan Muslim League (Q) ticket and then in 2013 on All Pakistan Muslim League ticket. He was runner up in 2002 and winner in 2013. He ran on Pakistan Muslim League (N) ticket in 2018 and lost. Former dictator and president of Pakistan, Pervez Musharraf initially expressed intention to run from this constituency being head of All Pakistan Muslim League but he resigned as APML head thus Mohammad Amjad, his replacement ran from this constituency from APML. Saleem Khan of Pakistan Peoples Party Parliamentarians had been a member of Khyber Pakhtunkhwa Assembly from 2008 to 2018 but he ran for National Assembly from this constituency in 2018.

Results

General election 2018: NA-1 Chitral
Party	Candidate	Votes	%	±%
MMA	Abdul Akbar Chitrali	48,616	29.58	▲0.41^{†}
PTI	Abdul Latif	38,481	23.41	▲4.06
PPP	Saleem Khan	32,635	19.86	▲3.95
PML(N)	Shahzada Iftikhar Uddin	21,016	12.79	▲10.82
Others	Others (seven candidates)	18,177	11.06	
Turnout		164,355	60.97	▼2.69
Rejected ballots		5,430	3.30	
Majority		10,135	6.17	
Registered electors		269,579		
MMA gain from APML				

^{†}JI and JUI-F contested as part of MMA

== Election 2013 ==
General Elections were held on 11 May 2013. Shahzada Iftikhar Uddin won this seat with 29,772 votes.

General Election 2013: NA-32 Chitral
Party	Candidate	Votes	%
APML	Shahzada Iftikhar Uddin	29,772	23.83
PTI	Abdul Latif	24,182	19.35
JI	Abdul Akbar Chitrali	20,520	16.42
PPP	Muhammad Hakeem Khan	19,877	15.91
JUI (F)	Hidayat ur Rehman	15,928	12.75
ANP	Syed Muzafar Ali Shah Jahan	6,728	5.38
TPAP	Irshad Alam Khan	3,948	3.16
PML(N)	Muhammad Younas	2,463	1.97
Independent	Muhammad Yahya	941	0.75
Independent	Asma Mehmood	587	0.47
Independent	Kamal Abdul Jamil	0	0.00
Valid ballots		124,946	95.00
Rejected ballots		6,574	5.00
Turnout		131,520	63.66
Majority		5,590	4.48
APML gain from PML(Q)			

== Election 2008 ==
General Elections were held on 18 February 2008. Shahzada Mohiuddin won this seat with 33,278 votes.

General Election 2008: NA-32 Chitral
Party	Candidate	Votes	%
PML(Q)	Shahzada Mohiuddin	33,278	38.53
Independent	Sardar Muhammad Khan	31,120	36.03
PPP	Ghulam Muhyuddin	18,516	21.44
MMA	Molvi Muhammad Jehangir Khan	2,759	3.19
Independent	Nadir Khawaja	695	0.80
Valid ballots		86,368	96.42
Rejected ballots		3,208	3.58
Turnout		89,576	45.46
Majority		2,158	2.50
PML(Q) gain from MMA			

== Election 2002 ==
General Elections were held on 10 October 2002. Abdul Akbar Khan won this seat with 36,130 votes.

General Election 2002: NA-32 Chitral
Party	Candidate	Votes	%
MMA	Abdul Akbar Chitrali	36,130	44.38
PML(Q)	Shahzada Iftikhar Uddin	23,907	29.37
PPP	Sardar Ali S. Aman	20,862	25.62
PTI	Abdul Latif	516	0.63
Valid ballots		81,415	96.94
Rejected ballots		2,572	3.06
Turnout		83,987	49.13
Majority		12,223	15.01
MMA gain from Independent			

== See also ==
- NA-266 Killa Abdullah-cum-Chaman
- NA-2 Swat-I
