= Qashqari =

Qashqari may refer to anything coming from or related to:

- Kashgar, an oasis city in Chinese Turkestan
  - Qashqari, a type of rubab, a stringed musical instrument
- Chitral, a city and region in northern Pakistan
  - Kho people, an ethnic group of Chitral
  - Khowar language, the Dardic language spoken by them
- Neel Kashkari, a U.S. Federal Reserve Bank president
