= Chitral (disambiguation) =

Chitral is a town in Pakistan.

Chitral may also refer to:

- Chitral District, a former administrative district of Pakistan
  - Lower Chitral District, an administrative district of Pakistan
  - Upper Chitral District, an administrative district of Pakistan
  - Chitral Tehsil, a subdivision of Lower Chitral District
- State of Chitral, the former princely state in the area of Chitral District
- Chitral River, a river in Afghanistan and Pakistan
- Chitral University
- Chitral Fort
- Chitral Museum
- Chitral Airport
- Chitral Gol National Park
- Chitral Scouts
- Chitral Bodyguard
- Chitral Expedition, an 1895 British military expedition to relieve the siege of Chitral

== See also ==
- Chitrali (disambiguation)
