= Rahima Naz =

- Born: Rahima; 14 February 1986 (age 40); Khot Valley, Torkhow, Chitral District, Pakistan
- Citizenship: Pakistani
- Education: MA
- Alma mater: Abdul Wali Khan University
- Occupations: Poet, writer, activist
- Spouse: Muhammad Naeem
- Children: Jibrail khan & Shehzil khan
- Writing career
- Pen name: Rodaba
- Period: 2010
- Genre: Ghazal
- Notable work: Lala-e-Kuhsaar

Rahima Naz (Urdu: رحیمہ ناز) (born 14 February 1986) is a Pakistani poet of Urdu and the Khowar language. The most prominent themes in Naz's poetry are love and feminism.

== Biography ==
Naz was born in a village in Khot Valley, Torkhow, Chitral District, Khyber Pakhtunkhwa, Pakistan. She did her matriculation from Federal Government Public Girls High School Cherat. Naz started writing at an early age and published her first volume of poetry, Lala-e-Kuhsaar to great acclaim, in 2011.

Naz is committed to girls right to education. She stands for women's rights and believes that women should have equal opportunities in every sector of life.

== Works ==
- Lala-e-Kuhsaar
