= Katoor dynasty =

Dynasty of Chitral, Pakistan

The Katoor dynasty (also spelled Katur and Kator) was a dynasty which, along with its collateral branches, ruled the Kingdom of Chitral and its neighbours in the eastern Hindu Kush region for over 450 years, from around 1570 until 1947. At the height of its power under Mehtar Aman ul-Mulk, the territory controlled by the dynasty extended from Asmar in the Kunar Valley to Sher Qilla in the Gilgit Valley. The Mehtar of Chitral was an influential player in the power politics of the region as he acted as an intermediary between the rulers of Badakhshan, the Yousafzai Pashtuns, the Maharaja of Kashmir and later the Amir of Afghanistan.

== Origins ==
The dynasty came to power in the 17th-century. During the course of 19th and 20th centuries, the Katoor rulers claimed or were held to have a number of contradictory origins, including descent from Alexander the Great or his Macedonian soldiers, descent from Timur, descent from Kamal Shams al-Din of Multan, and descent from a Khorasani adventurer, among others. (Note: "The great-great-great-grandfather of Nāser al-Molk claimed that he was the descendant of Alexander the Great, and his grandfather claimed to be a descendent of Kamāl Shams al-Din of Multan. Nāser al-Molk’s father’s genealogy is linked with Bābor, while Nāser al-Molk himself traced his descent back to Faridun Hoseyn of Herat." (Rahman 2011, p. 222)) However all of these claims lack attestation from contemporary sources and are considered implausible. (Note: "We have found that the Mughal sources are silent about the Timurid origin of the royal families of Chitral and Yasin, and that there is no evidence of their migration from Herat or from the regions held by the Mughals. The colonial sources, mostly based on oral reports from the Mehtars, also provide problematic genealogies. One of the earliest local sources, Mirzā Mohammad Siar’s Shāhnāma, has nothing to say on the topic. Other local historical sources, such as Ghofrān’s Mokhtasar and Tārikh-e Chetrār (Persian) and Mirzā Gholām Mortazā’s Nai tārikh-e Chetrāl, which fabricate a Timurid origin of the royal families of Chitral and Yasin and marriage ties with Raisa, provide contrasting details. Christopher Buyers, who in collaboration with members of the former royal family of Chitral developed a web site on the pedigree of the royal family of Chitral, also maintains that there is no evidence of the family’s relationship with the Timurids." (Rahman 2011, p. 227))

After a review of various claimed origins of the dynasty, Hidayat ur Rahman (2011) suggests the dynasty to have indigenous origin in the Hindu Kush region, and to be related to the Kator people of the neighbouring Bashgal Valley in Kafiristan (now Nuristan). (Note: "The geographical, traditional, oral and historical evidence proves that the Katur and Khushwakht families of Chitral and Yasin and the Katur or Katir tribe have the same origin." (Rahman 2011, p. 229)) He further points out to the close links of the dynasty with the Kator people and that during the wars with Rais dynasty, Katoor rulers frequently sought refuge with the Kators of Bashgal.

== History ==
When the dynasty was first founded by Shah Katoor, his domains included lower Chitral, Kunar Valley, Lot-Kuh, Torkhow and Mulkhow regions of upper Chitral. Under Shah Katoor II, Mastuj and the Yasin Valley also came under Katoor domination. The Kati and Kom tribes of Kafiristan, tribes of Dir Kohistan, Swat Kohistan and Kalam paid a yearly tribute to the mehtar. Shah Katoor III invaded Wakhan in retaliation for a raid on Chitral from Wakhan, and forced the mir of Wakhan to pay tribute as well. In 1876, Mehtar Aman ul-Mulk conquered the Ghizer and Punial and laid siege to the Dogra garrison of the maharaja of Kashmir in the Gilgit fort. During this time the tribes of Darel, Tangir and Kandia and the state of Nagar also paid tribute to the mehtar of Chitral. The Katoor dynasty's influence reached its peak under Mehtar Aman ul-Mulk, when territories of Ghizer, Yasin and Ishkoman were conquered in 1880.

== Rulers ==
The rulers of the Kator dynasty with the date of their accession:

1. Sangeen Ali (I) 1560
2. Muhtarram Shah Kator (I) 1585
3. Sangeen Ali (II) 1655
4. Muhammad Ghulam 1691
5. Shah Alam 1694
6. Shah Muhammad Shafi 1696
7. Shah Faramurd 1717
8. Shah Afzal (I) 1724
9. Shah Fazil 1754
10. Shah Nawaz Khan 1757
11. Shah Khairullah 1761
12. Shah Muhtarram Shah Kator (II) 1788
13. Shah Afzal (II) 1838
14. Muhtarram Shah Kator (III) 1854
15. Aman ul-Mulk 1856
16. Afzal ul-Mulk 1892
17. Sher Afzal 1892
18. Nizam ul-Mulk 1892
19. Amir ul-Mulk 1895
20. Shuja ul-Mulk 1895
21. Nasir ul-Mulk 1936
22. Muzaffar ul-Mulk 1943
23. Saif-ur-Rehman 1949
24. Muhammad Saif-ul-Mulk Nasir 1954
25. Fateh-ul-Mulk Ali Nasir 2011

== Descendants ==
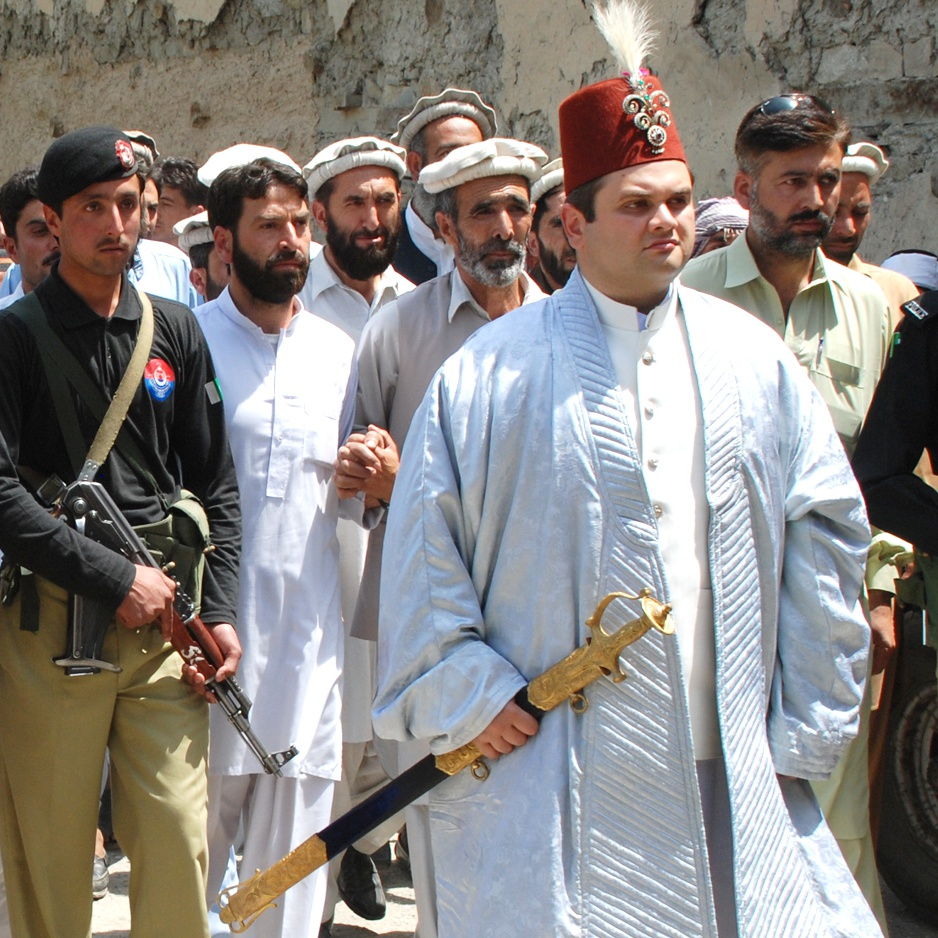
Mehtar Fateh-ul-Mulk Ali Nasir, the current head of the dynasty

The descendants of the Katoor dynasty are still respected and honoured in Chitral today. The last ruling mehtar, Muhammad Saif ul-Mulk Nasir was educated at Aitchison College. He had received Queen Elizabeth II Coronation Medal (1953) and Pakistan Republic Medal (1956).

=== Politics ===
The family continues to be one of the strongest political families in the district, although it has not consistently aligned itself with any particular party in the district. Shahzada Mohiuddin, grandson of Shuja ul-Mulk, served as the Minister of State for Tourism in the 1990s. He was twice elected as chairman of District Council Chitral, once as District Nazim, and four times as Member National Assembly of Pakistan (MNA). Shahzada Mohiuddin also served as chairman of the National Assembly Standing Committee on Kashmir Affairs and Northern Areas (KANA). The current head of the family, Fateh-ul-Mulk Ali Nasir, was elected to the provincial assembly of Khyber Pakhtunkhwa during the 2024 provincial elections.

=== Notable members of the royal family ===
Mata ul-Mulk, one of the youngers son of Shuja ul-Mulk, served in the first Kashmir war. He is best known for defeating the Indian forces in Skardu commanding the Chitral Bodyguard, during the Siege of Skardu.

Burhan-ud-Din, another son of Shuja ul-Mulk, served as commander of the Indian National Army in Burma. He also served as a Senator after the World War II.

Colonel Khushwaqt ul-Mulk, one of the younger sons of Shuja ul-Mulk, served as the commandant of East Pakistan (now Bangladesh) Rifles. He was educated at the Prince of Wales Royal Indian Military College (now the Rashtriya Indian Military College) at Dehradun, India. Following his father's death in 1936 he became the governor of Upper Chitral. He was a philanthropist and helped the Brooke Hospital for Animals, the British-based equine charity, to set up a centre in Pakistan. At the time of his death, he was the most senior surviving military officer of the Pakistan Army. His youngest son Sikander ul-Mulk has captained the Chitral Polo Team at Shandur for over two decades. His eldest son Siraj ul-Mulk has served in Pakistan Army and Pakistan International Airlines as a pilot.

Masood ul-Mulk, grandson of Shuja ul-Mulk, is a Pakistani expert on humanitarian aid. He is the son of Khush Ahmed ul-Mulk, the last surviving son of Shuja ul-Mulk. Khush Ahmed ul-Mulk served in the British Indian Army. As of 2014 he was the most senior surviving member of Chitral's royal family.

Taimur Khusrow ul-Mulk, grandson of Shuja ul-Mulk, and son of the daughter of the Nawab of Dir, served as a bureaucrat with the Federal Government of Pakistan and served as Accountant General Khyber Pakhtunkhwa prior to his retirement in 2016.
