= Chitrali languages =

Chitrali most often refers to:

- Khowar language, a Dardic language of Chitral, Pakistan

Chitral(i) language(s) may also refer to:

- any of the languages of Chitral
- a subgroup of the Dardic languages, comprising Khowar and Kalasha

== See also ==
- Chitrali (disambiguation)
