= Lotkhow =

Lotkhow لوٹ کھو
- valley
- Location within Khyber Pakhtunkhwa Location within Pakistan
- Coordinates: 35°59′45″N 71°33′48″E
- Country: Pakistan
- Province: Khyber Pakhtunkhwa
- District: Upper Chitral District
- Elevation: 1,800 m (5,900 ft)

Population (2026)
  - Total: 60,000

Languages
  - Official: Urdu
  - Native: Chitrali
- Time zone: UTC+5 (PST)

Lotkhow (Urdu: لوٹ کھو) is a valley located in Upper Chitral District, Khyber Pakhtunkhwa Province of Pakistan.

== History ==
Lotkhow is a historic valley of Chitral in northern Pakistan. It lies north of the main Chitral valley and has long been important as a route and cultural region connecting Chitral with the high valleys toward the Afghan and Central Asian frontier.

Ancient and medieval period:

Lotkhow has been inhabited for many centuries by communities speaking Khowar, the principal language of Chitral. The wider Chitral region was influenced at different times by Gandharan, Central Asian, Persian, and Tibetan cultural worlds because of its position between the Hindu Kush and the mountain corridors of Central Asia. Buddhism appears to have had an influence in the broader Chitral area before Islam became dominant. Archaeological remains in the region point to Chitral's connections with ancient Central Asian trade and cultural networks.

== Geographics ==
Lotkhow Valley is a mountainous valley in Upper Chitral District, Khyber Pakhtunkhwa, Pakistan, within the Hindu Kush mountain system. It is characterized by high mountains, narrow river valleys, glaciers, dry climate, and irrigated agricultural settlements.

== Demographics ==
Lotkhow is a predominantly Khowar-speaking, Muslim mountain region of Upper Chitral. Its population is distributed among numerous villages and small settlements rather than one large urban center.

Ethnicity: The population is predominantly Kho (Chitrali), with local communities having distinct clan, family, and village identities. Language: Khowar is the dominant language. Local varieties and accents can differ between communities.

Religion: The majority of residents are Muslim. Religious affiliation varies by locality, with Sunni communities predominating in much of the region and Ismaili communities present in parts of Chitral.

== Climate ==
According to the Köppen climate classification, the region experiences a Warm, dry-summer continental climate (Dsb). Winters are long, harsh, and heavily snow-bound, completely altering local mobility and forcing pastoralists to switch from high-altitude rangeland grazing to stall-feeding in the villages.

It experiences a semi-arid alpine climate. Winters are severe with heavy snowfall, while summers remain warm and dry.

== Crops ==
Tomatoes, barley, potatoes, beans, peas, wheat and walnuts are main crops.

== Botanical Wealth & Agriculture ==
A comprehensive 2024 academic study documented that Lotkoh is a high-altitude "tribal haven" with a massive treasure trove of indigenous plant knowledge.

- The valley houses over 150 unique plant species utilized across generations for organic medicine, human gastronomy, and livestock wintering.
- Local farmers thrive on mountain agriculture, cultivating potato crops, seasonal fruits, and harvesting high-value wild herbs.

== See also ==
- Khot Chitral
- Mulkhow
- Torkhow
