= Saleem Khan (politician) =

Pakistani politician

Member of the Provincial Assembly of Khyber Pakhtunkhwa
- In office 2008 – 28 May 2018
- Constituency: Constituency PK-89 (Chitral-I)

Personal details
- Born: 6 June 1968 (age 57) Garam Chashma, Chitral District, Khyber Pakhtunkhwa, Pakistan
- Party: PPP

Saleem Khan is a Pakistani politician who had been a Member of the Provincial Assembly of Khyber Pakhtunkhwa, from 2008 to May 2018.

== Early life and education ==
He was born on 6 June 1968 in Garam Chashma, Chitral District.

He has a degree in Bachelor of Education and a degree in Master of Arts.

== Political career ==
He was elected to the Provincial Assembly of the North-West Frontier Province as a candidate of Pakistan Peoples Party (PPP) from Constituency PF-89 (Chitral-I) in the 2008 Pakistani general election. He received 12,960 votes and defeated a candidate of Muttahida Majlis-e-Amal.

He was re-elected to the Provincial Assembly of Khyber Pakhtunkhwa as a candidate of PPP from Constituency PK-89 (Chitral-I) in the 2013 Pakistani general election. He received 11,418 votes and defeated a candidate of All Pakistan Muslim League.

He ran again in 2024 for the Provincial Assembly seat of Lower Chitral but was beaten by the PTI backed independent candidate Fateh-ul-Mulk Ali Nasir.

== Electoral history ==
=== 2018 ===
General election 2018: NA-1 (Chitral)
Party	Candidate	Votes	%
MMA	Abdul Akbar Chitrali	48,616	29.58
PTI	Abdul Latif	38,481	23.41
PPP	Saleem Khan	32,635	19.86
PML(N)	Shahzada Iftikhar Uddin	21,016	12.79
Others	Others (seven candidates)	18,177	11.06
