= NA-1 =

NA-1 may refer to:

- NA-1 Upper Chitral-cum-Lower Chitral, a constituency for the National Assembly of Pakistan
- Namco NA-1, a 16-bit arcade system board
