= Shahzada Iftikhar Uddin =

Pakistani politician

- شہزادہ افتخارالدین

Member of the National Assembly of Pakistan
- In office 1 June 2013 – 31 May 2018
- Constituency: NA-32 (Chitral)

Personal details
- Born: 15 August 1969 (age 56) Chitral, Khyber Pakhtunkhwa, Pakistan
- Party: PMLN (2013-present)
- Parent: Shahzada Mohiuddin (father)

Shahzada Iftikhar Uddin (Urdu: شہزادہ افتخار الدین; born 15 August 1969) is a Pakistani politician who was a member of the National Assembly of Pakistan from June 2013 to May 2018.

== Early life and education ==
Uddin was born on 15 August 1969 in Chitral to Shahzada Mohiuddin. He received his Bachelor of Arts from the State University of New York, his Bachelor of Science in Business Administration from the University of Wisconsin–Whitewater and his Master of Business Administration in International Business from the University of Birmingham.

== Political career ==
Uddin ran for the seat of the National Assembly of Pakistan as a candidate of Pakistan Muslim League (Q) from Constituency NA-32 (Chitral) in the 2002 Pakistani general election, but was unsuccessful and lost the seat to a candidate of Muttahida Majlis-e-Amal.

He was elected to the National Assembly as a candidate of All Pakistan Muslim League (APML) from Constituency NA-32 (Chitral) in the 2013 Pakistani general election, despite the boycott of the election by the APML.

== Electoral history ==
=== 2002 ===
General Election 2002: NA-32 (Chitral)
Party	Candidate	Votes	%
MMA	Abdul Akbar Chitrali	36,130	44.38
PML(Q)	Shahzada Iftikhar Uddin	23,907	29.37
PPP	Sardar Ali S. Aman	20,862	25.62
PTI	Abdul Latif	516	0.63
Valid ballots		81,415	96.94
Rejected ballots		2,572	3.06
Turnout		83,987	49.13
Majority		12,223	15.01
MMA gain from Independent			

=== 2013 ===
General Election 2013: NA-32 (Chitral)
Party	Candidate	Votes	%
APML	Shahzada Iftikhar Uddin	29,772	23.83
PTI	Abdul Latif	24,182	19.35
JI	Abdul Akbar Chitrali	20,520	16.42
PPP	Muhammad Hakeem Khan	19,877	15.91
JUI (F)	Hidayat ur Rehman	15,928	12.75
ANP	Syed Muzafar Ali Shah Jahan	6,728	5.38
TPAP	Irshad Alam Khan	3,948	3.16
PML(N)	Muhammad Younas	2,463	1.97
Independent	Muhammad Yahya	941	0.75
Independent	Asma Mehmood	587	0.47
Independent	Kamal Abdul Jamil	0	0.00
Valid ballots		124,946	95.00
Rejected ballots		6,574	5.00
Turnout		131,520	63.66
Majority		5,590	4.48
APML gain from PML(Q)			

=== 2018 ===
General election 2018: NA-1 (Chitral)
Party	Candidate	Votes	%
MMA	Abdul Akbar Chitrali	48,616	29.58
PTI	Abdul Latif	38,481	23.41
PPP	Saleem Khan	32,635	19.86
PML(N)	Shahzada Iftikhar Uddin	21,016	12.79
Others	Others (seven candidates)	18,177	11.06
