= Abdul Akbar Chitrali =

Pakistani politician

Moulana Abdul Akbar Chitrali

Member of the National Assembly of Pakistan
- In office 13 August 2018 – 10 August 2023
- Constituency: NA-1 Chitral
- In office 18 November 2002 – 15 November 2007
- Constituency: NA-32 Chitral

Personal details
- Party: TLP (2025-present)
- Other political affiliations: JIP (2024-2025); MNA (2002-2007; 2018-2023)

Moulana Abdul Akbar Chitrali is a Pakistani politician who had been a member of the National Assembly of Pakistan from August 2018 till August 2023.

== Political career ==
He was elected to the National Assembly as a candidate of MMA (a coalition of Jamaat-e-Islami Pakistan) from Constituency NA-1 (Chitral) in the 2018 Pakistani general election. He received 48,616 votes and defeated Abdul Latif, a candidate of Pakistan Tehreek-e-Insaf (PTI). Earlier to this, He has also served Chitral District of KP as MNA in Gen (R) Musharraf led government back in 2002.

On April 6, 2023, Maulana Abdul Akbar Chatrali demanded action in the pattern of operations in Malakand Division and Swat on the new wave of terrorism in the southern districts of Khyber Pakhtunkhwa, North Waziristan, Lakki Marwat and Dera Ismail Khan.

On May 17, 2021, Chitrali appeared to call for the use of nuclear weapons against Israel and, potentially, India, asking: "when will this atomic power be useful? Will we use these missiles as toys? To show our kids? Or will we keep these missiles and this atom bomb in some museum, so that we will be able to say [in the future] that at a certain era we had managed to acquire nuclear power?"

On June 14, 2023, Abdul Akbar Chitrali has submitted a privilege motion in the house against appointment of outsiders on low grade posts by Pakistan Post in Chitral.

== Electoral history ==
=== 2002 ===
General Election 2002: NA-32 Chitral
Party	Candidate	Votes	%
MMA	Abdul Akbar Chitrali	36,130	44.38
PML(Q)	Shahzada Iftikhar Uddin	23,907	29.37
PPP	Sardar Ali S. Aman	20,862	25.62
PTI	Abdul Latif	516	0.63
Valid ballots		81,415	96.94
Rejected ballots		2,572	3.06
Turnout		83,987	49.13
Majority		12,223	15.01
MMA gain from Independent			

=== 2013 ===
General Election 2013: NA-32 Chitral
Party	Candidate	Votes	%
APML	Shahzada Iftikhar Uddin	29,772	23.83
PTI	Abdul Latif	24,182	19.35
JI	Abdul Akbar Chitrali	20,520	16.42
PPP	Muhammad Hakeem Khan	19,877	15.91
JUI (F)	Hidayat ur Rehman	15,928	12.75
ANP	Syed Muzafar Ali Shah Jahan	6,728	5.38
TPAP	Irshad Alam Khan	3,948	3.16
PML(N)	Muhammad Younas	2,463	1.97
Independent	Muhammad Yahya	941	0.75
Independent	Asma Mehmood	587	0.47
Independent	Kamal Abdul Jamil	0	0.00
Valid ballots		124,946	95.00
Rejected ballots		6,574	5.00
Turnout		131,520	63.66
Majority		5,590	4.48
APML gain from PML(Q)			

=== 2018 ===
General election 2018: NA-1 Chitral
Party	Candidate	Votes	%
MMA	Abdul Akbar Chitrali	48,616	29.58
PTI	Abdul Latif	38,481	23.41
PPP	Saleem Khan	32,635	19.86
PML(N)	Shahzada Iftikhar Uddin	21,016	12.79
Others	Others (seven candidates)	18,177	11.06
