= Singoor =

Village in Chitral, Pakistan

Singoor SINGUR
- Town
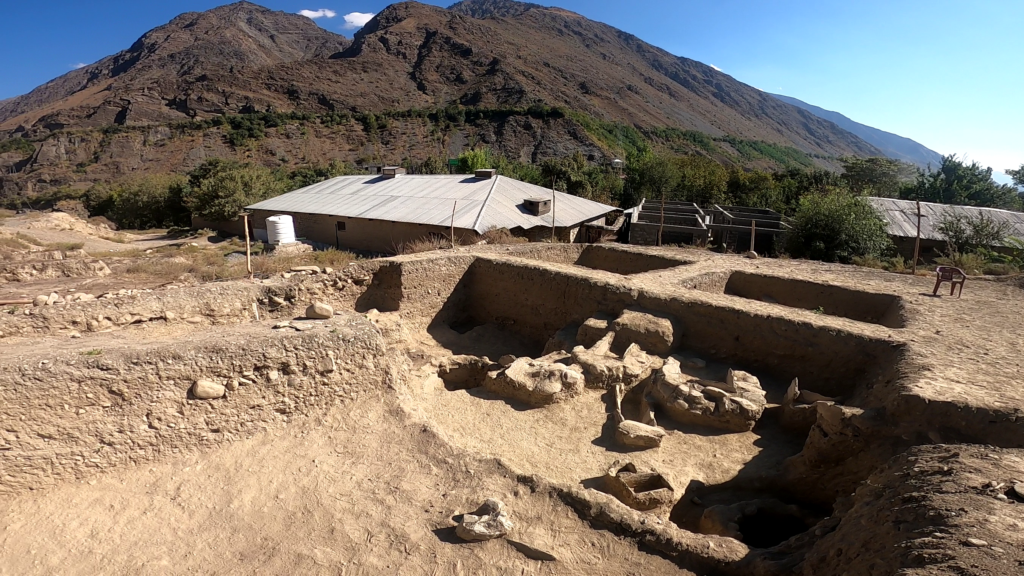
- Gankoreneotek Grave

- Location within Pakistan
- Coordinates: 35°53′47″N 71°47′45″E
- Country: Pakistan
- State: Khyber Pakhtunkhwa
- District: Lower Chitral
- Founded: 3000 years ago

Government
  - Type: Municipal Corporation
  - Body: Municipal Corporation

Area
  - Total: 26 km^{2} (10 sq mi)

Population (2014)
  - Total: 2,018
  - Density: 78/km^{2} (200/sq mi)

Languages
  - Official: Chitrali
- Time zone: UTC+5 (PST)
- Postal Index Number: 17200 - xxx
- Telephone code: +924 - 7

Singoor also spelled as Singur is a village located in Lower Chitral District, Khyber Pakhtunkhwa Province of Pakistan.

Archaeological site and Gankorineotek cemetery is also located here.

== History ==
The area is home to several ancient burial sites, dating back to the Vedic period.

== Climate ==
Singoor has a continental climate, with an average annual temperature of 1.4 °C (34.5 °F). The Mediterranean-influence on the climate in Singoor results in drier summers and wetter winters, with approximately 960 millimetres (38 in) of annual precipitation.

== Educational Institutions ==
- Singoor Public School

== See also ==
- Seenlasht
- Orghoch
