= Karishma Ali =

Pakistani footballer

International career
Years	Team	Apps	(Gls)
2016-17	Pakistan women's national football team		
Medal record
Second place	Jubilee Games	2016

Karishma Ali (c.1997) is a footballer and the first girl from her hometown of Chitral, Khyber-Pakhtunkhwa, to represent Pakistan at national and international levels. In 2016, Ali represented Pakistan at the Jubilee Games held in Dubai and was part of the first Pakistani women's team to participate in the Australian Football League International Cup in 2017. She is also the founder of Chitral Women's Sports Club.

In 2019, she was listed in the Forbes 30 Under 30 Asia List, where young people are chosen for innovation and entrepreneurship. Ali walked the Milan Fashion Week in 2019 when Haitian-Italian designer Stella Jean collaborated with craftswomen from a handicraft center had Ali founded to create designs, incorporating cultural elements from Chitrali and Kalash cultures.

== Life ==
Karishma Ali generated an interest in football at an early age. She used to watch football matches with her father which captured her attention and she started falling in love with the sport. In Chitral, Karishma did not have the facilities to become a professional footballer, however, her father; a sports enthusiast, wanted her to become part of the sport. When she moved to the city at 15, she received her first professional football training. She has been professionally trained as a footballer since then.

== Education ==
Karishma Ali holds a bachelor's degree in Business and Management from the University of London.

== Career ==
In 2016, Karishma got the opportunity to represent Pakistan by becoming a part of the international football team playing for Jubilee games in Dubai. The team won a silver medal in the games.

in 2017, Karishma was a part of the first women's team to represent Pakistan at the Australian Football League International.

== Achievements ==
Aside from her football career, Karishma is lauded for her social work and dedication to her people. She has founded the Chitral Women's Sports Club to uplift the position of girls in sports, particularly football The club is the first women's sports club in Chitral. She is also part of youth organizations and has been praised by organizations such as CNN and Forbes, for her philanthropic work.

=== Chitral Women's sports club ===
After coming back from the Jubilee games in 2016, Ali says she was inspired to work for the underprivileged people of her hometown and she started arranging football training camps for girls schools. Initially, the week long camp was intended for 10 girls, but after a positive response, the camp catered 70 girls. The training sessions were arranged in the mountains with a few volunteers, to provide a safe place for the girls to play. The club officially began in 2018 and has since then, trained girls in Chitral.

The club has since then arranged tournaments for girls and also had training sessions with professional trainers certified from FIFA. The club now has an official team of 13 girls that will represent Chitral in future tournaments.

Karishma hopes to create proper football grounds in the future, for the girls of Chitral to play in a safe environment. In an interview she said: "Ten years from now I want to see at least 10-20 more girls like myself who come back here [Chitral] after they've achieved their dream and work for the other girls that I was not able to reach out to and, slowly, I see a progressive society where men and women are working equally, where women do not have to stress about traditional customs, and be able to freely do what they can and see that I was part of all of this change."

"I want to see more women in leadership positions and then sit back and enjoy. This is what I wanted to fight for," she added.

Ali is also developing an exchange program for female players with a football club in Islamabad.

=== Chitral Women's Handicrafts center ===
Karishma started the Chitral Women's Handicrafts Center, which showcases the traditional clothing, jewelry and handicrafts made by the women of Chitral.

Karishma's initiative was recognized by the Duke and Duchess of Cambridge and the handicrafts were featured in Milan fashion show as well.

=== National youth council ===
Karishma Ali was selected for the Prime Minister's National Youth Council; a platform led by the Prime Minister. The council is composed of selected youth from the country who are tasked to lead and make decisions for the youth of Pakistan.

=== CYSOM 2019, Brunei ===
Karishma Ali was selected for Commonwealth Youth Senior Officials Meeting in Brunei, where she represented Pakistan. The event was attended by youth leaders from Asia. The participants of the meeting discussed the various country-specific challenges and opportunities in implementing youth policies in the region.

=== Forbes 30 under 30 ===
Ali was featured in Forbes 30 under 30, 2019, sports and entertainment category. According to Forbes: "Karishma Ali of Chitral, Pakistan is the first girl from her hometown to have played football at a national and international level. She has represented Pakistan at the Jubilee Games in Dubai, and her team was the first women's team from Pakistan to participate in the AFL International Cup. Ali is also the founder of the Chitral Women's Sports Club."

== Collaboration with Stella Jean ==
In 2019, Haitian-Italian designer Stella Jean traveled to Pakistan as part of her collection Laboratory of Nations, where the designer aimed to bridge a gap between Italy and nine of its mission destinations, one of which was Pakistan. The aim was to promote United Nations' Strategic Development Goals and empower women from rural areas. In Pakistan, Jean collaborated with Karishma Ali to create designs, using traditional embroidery from the Chitral and Kalash area. Jean also traveled to the Kalash Valley, where she met with women from the Chitral Women's Handicrafts Center, founded by Ali. Forty-six women from the center created 400 meters of embroidery, that Jean used in her collection, which was featured on Vogue.

At the Milan Fashion Week 2019, Ali walked the ramp in one of the designs made in the collaborative project. She later thanked the designer for paying a 'heart-felt homage to our culture by infusing the embroidery done by women of Pakistan in the northern areas as an essential part of her collection'

== Criticism ==
Karishma's achievement as a female footballer was met with much curiosity and criticism from the public. There were speculations that Karishma was not from Chitral but from some big city where she was able to achieve her milestone. In an interview, Karishma revealed the backlash she received when she made her mark as the first female footballer from Chitral. She received hatred and criticism on the social media and allegedly received threats for herself and her family to stop her from continuing as a footballer, to which Karishma said:" I understand because I was the first female footballer from the place, so I understand why people went against me. But I wasn’t expecting it to be at that level. I didn’t think that I would receive so much hate, and especially when it kept going on for months and months." Karishma was also criticized for not acting according to the culture of the society.
