= Constituency WR-10 =

Reserved seat in a Pakistani provincial assembly

- Constituency for the Khyber Pakhtunkhwa Assembly
- Region: Chitral District

Current constituency
- Member: Bibi Fozia

Constituency WR-10 is a reserved seat for women in the Khyber Pakhtunkhwa Assembly.

== See also ==
- Constituency PK-89 (Chitral-I)
- Constituency PK-90 (Chitral-II)
