= Thoi Pass =

Mountain pass in Pakistan

- Interactive map of Thoi Pass
- Elevation: 5,005 m (16,421 ft)

Location
- Location: Gilgit-Baltistan, Pakistan
- Range: Hindukush Mountains
- Coordinates: 36°37′48″N 73°4′10″E

Thoi pass ( تھوئی) (el. 5,005 m ) is a high mountain pass that connects Gazin in Yarkhun River valley in Chitral to Nialthi in the Yasin Valley in Gupis-Yasin District in Pakistan. Village Nalti lies on the south bank of Thoi river (Thoi e Sande), that runs off from the glacier lying to the east of the pass.

It is also known as Thoi pass (locally its called Thoi Haghosth) Haghosth is a brosho word which is exactly used for pass in brosho literature. Thoi Haghosth situated in Moshbar valley which is situated on lift side of Khaimathbar and on right of Dasbar valley mostly all these bars are used as pastures for cattle by local people (Bar is local used for a geographical feature, comprizes of meadows, forests streams with enough area etc and has a Statue of Miguel Pearlos (unconfirmed about the statue) at the base. In old era people were using these pass for multi purposes, the local people of Thoi were going Yarkhoon thorough this in order to buy cattle's etc.
