= University of Buner =

Coordinates: 34°28′44.1″N 72°29′23.3″E

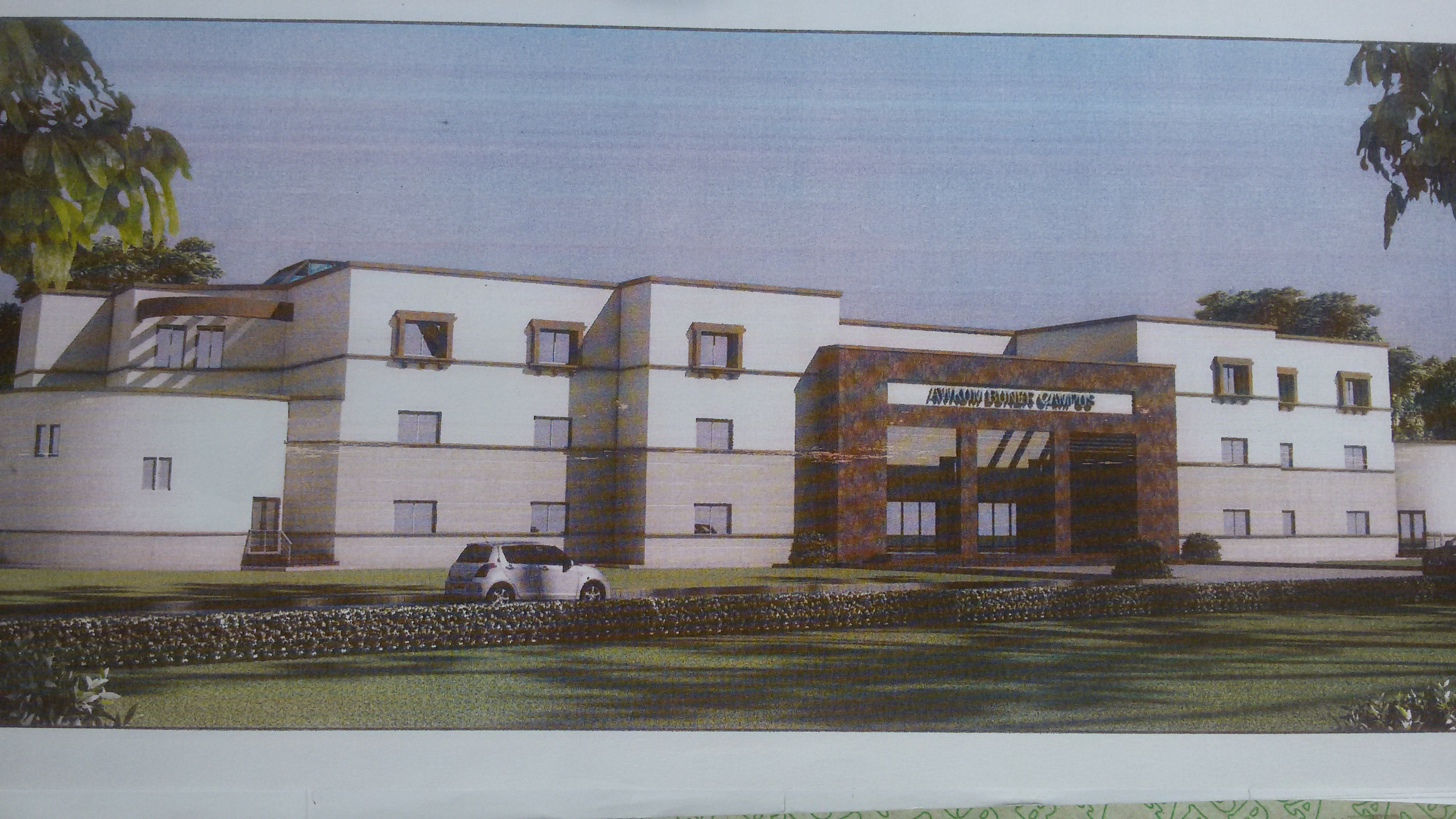
- Type: Public
- Established: 2012
- Affiliations: HEC
- Chancellor: Governor of Khyber Pakhtunkhwa
- Vice-Chancellor: Amin Badshah
- Academic staff: Inayat Khan
- Administrative staff: Sardar Ali, Israr Ahmad
- Location: Buner, Khyber Pakhtunkhwa, Pakistan
- Website: ubuner.edu.pk

The University of Buner (Urdu: جامعۂ بونیر; Pashto: د بونیر پوهنتون) is a public sector university located in the Buner District of the Khyber Pakhtunkhwa province of Pakistan.

== Overview and history ==
University of Buner was approved by the Government of Khyber Pakhtunkhwa in November, 2012. Dr Muhammad Farooq was appointed as its project director. The university is being upgraded from the Abdul Wali Khan University Mardan, Buner campus, to a full-fledged university, the University of Buner, by the government of Khyber Pakhtunkhwa.

== Departments ==
The university currently has 7 departments.

- Department of Zoology
- Department of Computer Science
- Department of Management Sciences
- Department of Economics
- Department of Electronics
- Department of Political Science.
- Department of English

== See also ==
- Abdul Wali Khan University
- University of Swat
- University of Chitral
