= Zagaran Pass =

Pakistani mountain pass

- Interactive map of Zagaran Pass
- Elevation: 5,005 m (16,421 ft)

Location
- Location: Gilgit-Baltistan
- Range: Hindukush Mountains
- Coordinates: 36°20′33″N 72°48′14″E

The Zagaran Pass is a high mountain pass that connects Yarkhun River valley in Chitral District to the Gupis valley in Gilgit-Baltistan.

The pass is southwest from Bahushtar Zom peak (5703 m) and east-southeast from Malo Zom peak (5652 m). The border between Chitral and Northern Areas runs through the pass. The top of the pass is on the rapidly retreating glacier. 8 km to the east of the pass is the valley of Bakhushtaro river that flows southeast for 19 km up to its confluence with Gilgit River some 9.6 km west of village Pinal. To the west of the pass is an unnamed westward directed valley that after 24 km ends at Yarkhun river some 8 km northeast of town Mastuj.
