= Brun, Pakistan =

Village in Khyber Pakhtunkhwa, Pakistan

Brun
- Village
- Location within Khyber Pakhtunkhwa Location within Pakistan
- Coordinates: 35.70039°N 71.69208°E
- Country: Pakistan
- Province: Khyber Pakhtunkhwa
- District: Chitral
- Time zone: UTC+5 (PST)

Brun is a village located in the Lower Chitral District of Khyber Pakhtunkhwa, Pakistan. It is situated in the Bumburet Valley.

== Demographics and economy ==
The village is home to the Kalash people who are animists. They have traditionally relied on subsistence farming and animal husbandry for survival. Some have been involved in other endeavours such as selling their handicrafts.

In recent years, the traditional ways of the residents are evolving. Some have also converted to Islam.

== Landmarks ==
Kalasha Dur Museum is an important landmark in the village and displays the cultural heritage of the Kalash people. It was funded by a Greek NGO, and opened in 2005.

Brun also has a school and a Kalash temple.

Tourism industry here has struggled. But the village does have lodging and boarding facilities.

It is stair-step village with wooden houses built against the hills at different levels.
