= Abdul Latif (Pakistani politician) =

Member of the National Assembly of Pakistan from Chitral (2024–2029)

- عبدُ اللطیف

Member of the National Assembly of Pakistan
- In office 29 February 2024 – 29 July 2025
- Constituency: NA-1 Upper Chitral-cum-Lower Chitral

Personal details
- Party: PTI (2002-present)

Abdul Latif (Urdu: عبدُ اللطیف) is a Pakistani politician who served as Member of the National Assembly of Pakistan from 29 February 2025 to 29 July 2025. He was disqualified by Election Commission on 29 July 2025 in terms of Article 63.

== Political career ==
Latif ran for the National Assembly of Pakistan as a candidate of Pakistan Tehreek-e-Insaf (PTI) from NA-32 Chitral in the 2002 Pakistani general election, but was unsuccessful. He received 516 votes and was defeated by Abdul Akbar Chitrali, a candidate of Muttahida Majlis-e-Amal (MMA).

He ran for the National Assembly as a candidate of PTI from NA-32 Chitral in the 2013 Pakistani general election, but was unsuccessful. He received 24,182 votes and was defeated by Shahzada Iftikhar Uddin, a candidate of All Pakistan Muslim League (APML).

He ran for the National Assembly as a candidate of PTI from NA-1 Chitral in the 2018 Pakistani general election, but was unsuccessful. He received 38,481 votes and was defeated by Abdul Akbar Chitrali, a candidate of MMA.

He was elected to the National Assembly as an independent candidate supported by PTI from NA-1 Upper Chitral-cum-Lower Chitral in the 2024 Pakistani general election. He received 61,834 votes and defeated Muhammad Talha Mahmood, a candidate of Jamiat Ulema-e-Islam (F) (JUI-F), who received 42,987 votes. He was disqualified by Election Commission of Pakistan on 29 July 2025 in terms of article 63 of constitution of Pakistan.
