= Bibi Fozia =

Pakistani politician

MPA Bibi Fozia

Parliamentary Secretary in Tourism Department to Chief Minister
- In office 2 November 2015 – 28 May 2018

Member of the Khyber Pakhtunkhwa Assembly
- In office 31 May 2013 – 28 May 2018
- Constituency: WR-10

Personal details
- Party: Pakistan Tehreek-e-Insaf
- Occupation: Politician

Bibi Fozia (Pashto: بى بى فوزيہ) is a Pakistani politician hailing from Chitral District, who is served as a member of the 10th Khyber Pakhtunkhwa Assembly, belonging to the Pakistan Tehreek-e-Insaf.

== Education ==
Fozia got her Master of Arts Degree in Anthropology.

== Political career ==
Bibi Fozia was elected as the member of the Khyber Pakhtunkhwa Assembly on Reserved Seats for Women from Constituency WR-10 in 2013.
