= Nursing in Pakistan =

Nursing is a major component of Pakistan's health-care system. The topic has been the subject of extensive historical studies, is as of 2021 a major issue in the country, and has been the subject of much scholarly discussion amongst academics and practitioners. In 2009, Pakistan's government stated its intent to improve the country's nursing care.

Nursing is a health-care profession which is mainly aimed on the care of families and individuals. Nursing is important in every part of the world, especially in developing countries like Pakistan. In 2021, Pakistan faces a great shortage of trained nurses.

== Nursing education and organizations ==
Pakistani educational system included these nursing institutes:

1. School of Nursing, Christian Hospital, Quetta
2. Karachi King's (K.K) School & College of Nursing, Karachi
3. New Life School & College of Nursing, Karachi
4. New Life Institute of Nursing, Multan
5. People's Nursing School, LUMHS Jamshoro, Sindh
6. Jamshoro College of Nursing, Jamshoro
7. College of Nursing, PIMS, Islamabad at Shaheed Zulfiqar Ali Bhutto Medical University Islamabad
8. College of Nursing, Jinnah Post Graduate Medical Centre, Karachi affiliated with Liaquat University of Medical and Health Sciences, Jamshoro, Sindh
9. Institute of Nursing at Dow University of Health Sciences, Karachi
10. Aga Khan University School of Nursing,
11. Institute of Nursing Sciences, Khyber Medical University, Peshawar
12. Pakistan Institute of Medical Sciences School of Nursing.
13. Institute of Nursing Dow University of Health Sciences, Karachi
14. The Ilmiya Institute of Nursing, Karachi affiliated with Liaquat University of Medical and Health Sciences, Jamshoro
15. Karachi Adventist College of Nursing
16. Sachal Sarmast Institute of Nursing, Khairpur, Sindh
17. Mehran School of Nursing, Khairpur
18. Shifa College of Nursing, Islamabad
19. Liaquat National College of Nursing, Karachi affiliated with Liaquat University of Medical and Health Sciences, Jamshoro
20. Lahore School of Nursing, University of Lahore
21. College of Nursing, Allama Iqbal Medical College, Lahore
22. Postgraduate College of Nursing, Lahore, Punjab
23. College of Nursing, Isra University, Karachi
24. College of Nursing, Ziauddin University, Karachi
25. Institute of Nursing Sciences, Khyber Medical University, Peshawar
26. Life Saving institute of Nursing, Karachi
27. Rufaidah Nursing College, Peshawar (A project of Peshawar Medical College affiliated with Riphah International University, Islamabad
28. College of Nursing, Rehman Medical Institute
29. College of Nursing, Saida Waheed FMH
30. School of Nursing, Holy Family Hospital, Karachi
31. Naushahro Feroze Institute of Nursing at Naushahro Feroze, Sindh

The Canadian International Development Agency funded several nursing education initiatives in the 1980s and 1990s.

Pakistan has established professional nursing organizations. The Pakistan Nursing Council (PNC), established in 1948 and formally constituted by Acts in 1952 and 1973, certifies nurses, midwives, Lady Health Visitors (LHVs), Licensed Practical Nurses and Nursing Auxiliaries for practice. The PNC has involvement in improving and standardizing public education and clinical nursing standards. They also oversee the ethical standards and general welfare of nurses. The PNC inspects and approves nursing schools. This Council also approves education programs and has the authority to examine, register and enrol nurses, midwives and nursing auxiliaries of nursing council. The Council provides licenses to the nursing agencies and monitors nursing employers.

== History ==
Initially, the health-care services in Pakistan were ill-developed and the rate of employment in health-care jobs in Pakistan was very low. Since 1951 Pakistani governments have concentrated on the development and improvement of health care services and one of the major steps is increasing the rate of funding to Pakistan Nursing Council Clinics. This Nursing Council (PNC) has also played a key role to provide world-class health care and nursing council services to the patients and has been accredited by the Higher Education Commission of Pakistan.

== Nurse-Patient ratio in Pakistan ==
Pakistan had a nurse-to-population ratio of 1:32000 in 1960, improving to 1:5199 by 1997. In 2013, the situation had further improved when nurse-patient ratio in Pakistan was approximately 1:50.

Pakistani medical sector has historically been preoccupied with cure rather than care which resulted in Pakistan producing a massive number of doctors every year and ignoring the shortage in the nursing workforce.

In 2015, according to the Journal of Pioneering Medical Sciences, the nurse-patient ratio in Pakistan again was approximately 1:50.

In 2021, an interactive chart showing nurses and midwives (per 1,000 people) - Pakistan compared to all other countries in the world per The World Bank website.

== Global-2020 100 outstanding nurses list ==
In 2020, 8 Pakistani nurses and midwives were included among the 'Global-2020 100 Outstanding Women Nurses and Midwives'. This list had 100 professionals from a total of 43 countries who were recognised by World Health Organization (WHO), United Nations Fund for Population Activities (UNFPA) and the International Council of Nursing for their services to help raise healthcare standards across the world. All 8 above-mentioned nurses were from the Aga Khan University Hospital, Karachi.

== See also ==
- Khoshey people
- Midwife
- 2010 Pakistan floods
- King Hamad University of Nursing and Associated Medical Sciences, Islamabad
