= Mehtar =

Mehtar may refer to:

- Mehtar, a rare and obsolete title for a ruler in the Northwest Frontier region, notably in the following princely states:
  - Chitral (princely state), from before 1700
  - Yasin State, from 1892

Places

- Mehtar, Lorestan, a village in Iran
- Mehtar, Zanjan, a village in Iran
- Mehtar, Tajikistan, a village in Tajikistan

Other

- Mehtar, an alternative name for the Indo-Aryan Domari language, spoken by older Dom people scattered across the Middle East and North Africa
- Mehtar, another name for the Hela and Hela Mehtar communities of India

== See also ==
- Hesar Mehtar (disambiguation)
