= University of Chitral =

University in Khyber Pakhtunkhwa, Pakistan

- Type: Public
- Established: 2017
- Chancellor: Chief Minister of Khyber Pakhtunkhwa
- Vice-Chancellor: Prof. Dr. Hazir Ullah
- Location: Chitral, Khyber Pakhtunkhwa, Pakistan
- Website: uoch.edu.pk

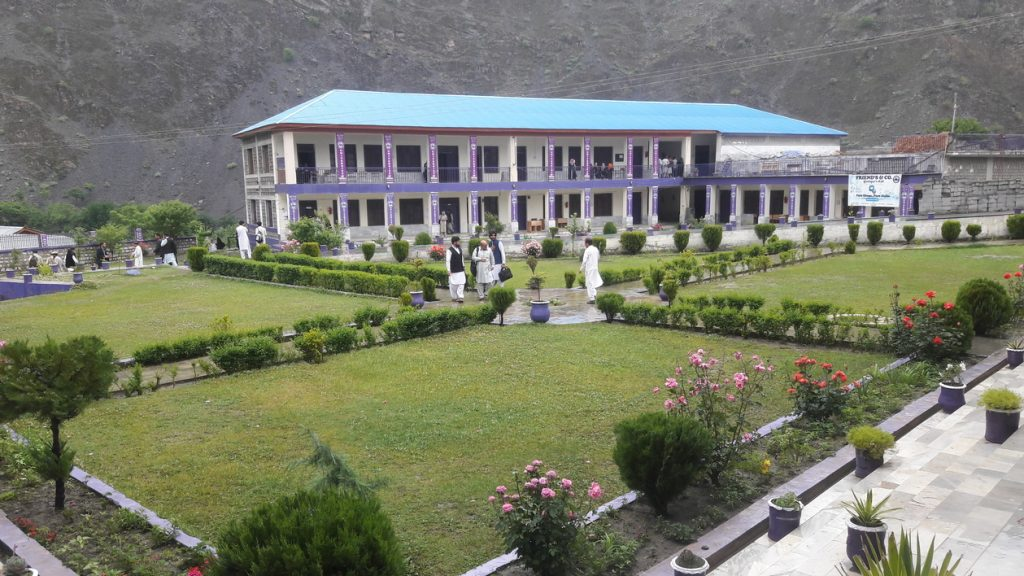
University of Chitral

University of Chitral is a public sector university located in the Chitral District of the Khyber Pakhtunkhwa province of Pakistan. The university was founded in 2017. It is being run by the provincial government.

== Overview and history ==
The University of Chitral was established in the District Chitral by the government of Khyber Pakhtunkhwa in 2017. The university was founded in response to a notification issued by the Higher Education, Archives and Libraries Department of Khyber Pakhtunkhwa, bearing the reference number SO(UE-II)3-1/2017 and dated March 31, 2017.

Before the inception of the University of Chitral, there were two university campuses operating in the district Chitral which were the sub-campuses of Shaheed Benazir Bhutto University, Sheringal and Abdul Wali Khan University Mardan. Due to a steady increase in student enrollment across these campuses over time, the demand for academic amenities witnessed a substantial surge. The existing academic, research, and residential infrastructure were not enough to cater for the actual requirements of all the students. This circumstance prompted the imperative for the establishment of a full-fledged university in Chitral. The residents of Chitral had long been advocating for the establishment of a fully-fledged university within the region. Responding to this demand, the University of Chitral was founded in 2011.

University of Chitral will act as a "regional educational corridor" for Pakistan, Afghanistan, Central Asia via Wakhan Strip, Gilgit Baltistan and Gilgit-Chitral, Dir, Malakand alternate CPEC Route.

== Departments ==
The university currently has the following Departments.

- Department of Botany
- Department of Computer Science
- Department of Economics
- Department of Education
- Department of English Language & Literature
- Department of Management Sciences
- Department of Political Science
- Department of Sociology
- Department of Tourism and Hotel Management
- Department of Urdu
- Department of Zoology

== See also ==
- Shaheed Benazir Bhutto University, Sheringal
- Abdul Wali Khan University
- University of Malakand, Chakdara
- University of Buner
