= Zainul Abideen =

Pakistani politician

Zainul Abideen MPA

Member of the Khyber Pakhtunkhwa Assembly
- In office 1993–1996

Zainul Abideen was a Pakistani politician who served as a member of the Khyber Pakhtunkhwa Assembly and was affiliated with PPP.
