= Afzal ul-Mulk =

Mehtar of Chitral (1867–1892)

- The Mehtar of Chitral
- Tenure: 1892–1892 (two months)
- Predecessor: Mehtar Aman ul-Mulk
- Successor: Mehtar Sher Afzal
- Born: 1867; Chitral
- Died: 1892 (aged 24–25)
- Buried: Chitral
- Residence: Chitral Fort
- Family: Katoor Dynasty

Afzal ul-Mulk (1 January 1867 – 6 November 1892) was the Mehtar (ruler) of the princely state of Chitral who briefly ruled following the death of his father the Mehtar Aman ul-Mulk, usurping the right of his elder brother Nizam ul-Mulk. His reign lasted two months and seven days before he was murdered by his uncle Sher Afzal.
