= Jubilee Games =

Sports event

Jubilee Games is an international sporting event in which Ismailis from around the world participate. Jubilee games started as Golden Jubilee Games, as commemoration of 50 years of Immamat of Aga Khan IV. The first event of Jubilee games was held in 2008, in Nairobi, Kenya.

== History ==
Jubilee games started as a part of Golden Jubilee celebration of Aga Khan IV. Jubilee games started as Golden Jubilee games but continued as Jubilee Games. The first event held in Nairobi, Kenya in 2008. Jubilee games are meant to promote competitive sport and fitness among Ismaili Jamaat. Jubilee games will held every four years from now onwards.

== Jubilee Games 2008 ==
Jubilee games of 2008 were held in Kenya. Jubilee Games 2008 attracted 1200 Ismaili athletes from 28 countries.

== Jubilee Games 2016 ==
Jubilee Games of 2016 held in Dubai, UAE, from 22 to 29 July 2017. Jubilee games 2016 was bigger and a larger event, that attracted 2200 athletes and around 1500 volunteers. A total of 16 games, including individual and team sports were part of Jubilee games.

=== Event ===
The opening ceremony was attended by Shaikh Nahyan bin Mubarak Al Nahyan, the Minister of Culture and Knowledge Development. The event included a concert by Salim-Sulaiman.

=== Results ===
Rank	Nation	Gold	Silver	Bronze	Total
1	Canada (CAN)	20	21	10	51
2	Pakistan (PAK)	17	14	0	31
3	Tajikistan (TJK)	10	10	6	26
4	Great Britain (GBR)	5	1	0	6
5	India (IND)	4	6	6	16
6	Tanzania (TAN)	4	0	1	5
7	United States (USA)	3	8	9	20
8	Kenya (KEN)	3	8	7	18
9	Afghanistan (AFG)	3	2	3	8
10	United Arab Emirates (UAE)	1	2	0	3
11	Madagascar (MAD)	1	1	1	3
Totals (11 entries)		71	73	43	187

== Jubilee Games 2020 ==
Cancelled due to pandemic.

== Jubilee Games 2025 ==
Jubilee Games of 2025 were held in Dubai, UAE, from 20 to 27 July 2025. Jubilee games 2025 was an even bigger and larger event, that attracted over 4000 athletes and around 3000 volunteers. A total of 19 sports, including individual and team sports were part of Jubilee games.
