= Chumurkone =

Pakistani village

Chumurkone Chomorkhon
- Town
- Chumurkone
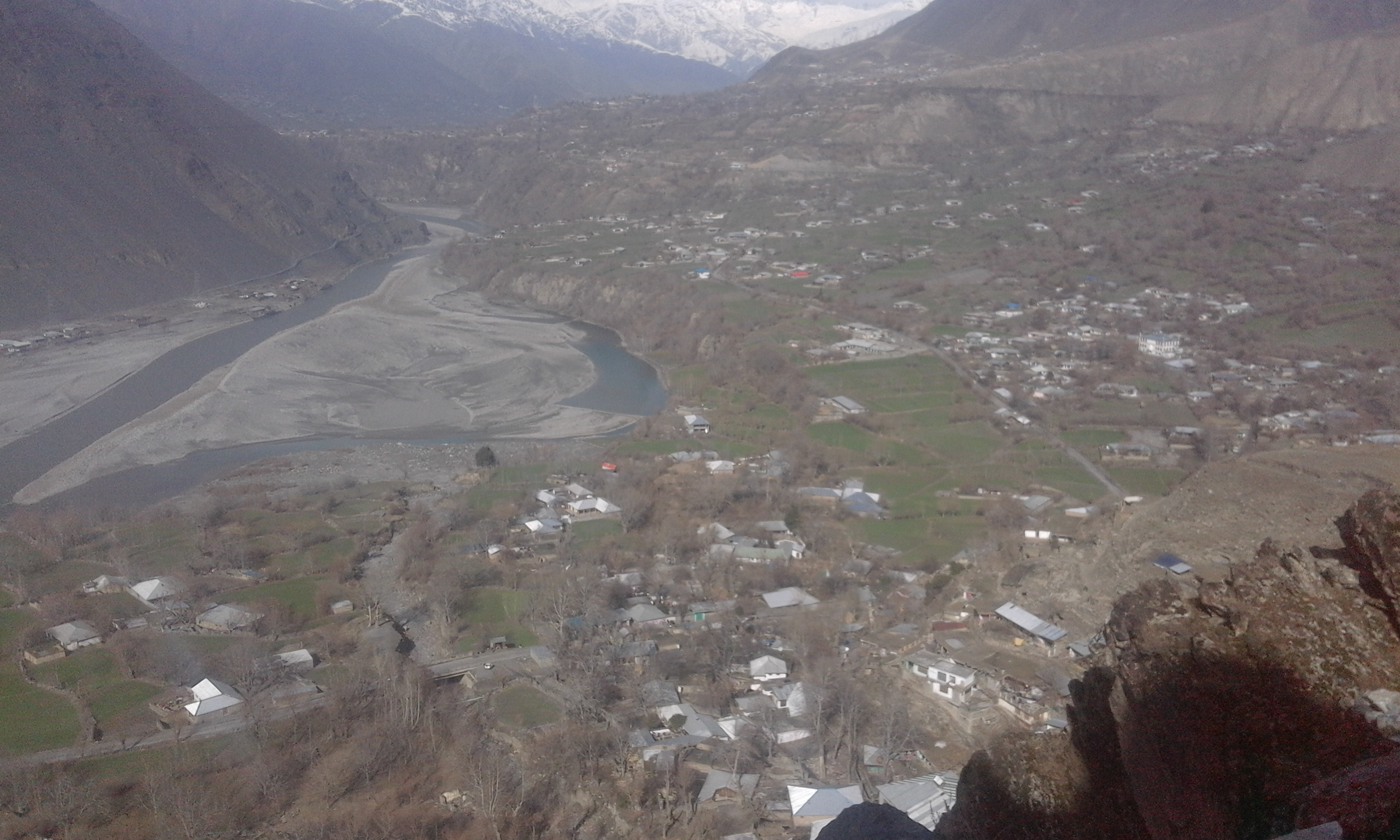
- View of the village
- Nickname: Chumren Khon
- Anthem: Anthem of Pakistan
- Location within Khyber Pakhtunkhwa Location within Pakistan
- Coordinates: 35°47′37.9″N 71°46′51.0″E
- Country: Pakistan
- Province: Khyber Pakhtunkhwa
- District: Lower Chitral District
- Founder: Kalash Tribal Leader
- Named for: Iron Rod

Government
  - Type: Elected Government
  - Body: PTI

Dimensions
  - Length: 5 km (3.1 mi)
  - Width: 3 km (1.9 mi)
- Time zone: PST+5
- Website: www.chitral.gov.pk

Chumurkone (Urdu: چمرکون) is a village in the Lower Chitral District of Khyber Pakhtunkhwa, Pakistan. It is situated approximately 13 km (8.1 mi) south of Chitral city along the Chitral River.

== Geography and Climate ==
=== Location ===
Chumurkone is located in the southern region of Lower Chitral, nestled in the Hindu Kush mountain range. The village sits at an elevation of approximately 1,550 m (5,090 ft) above sea level.

=== Climate ===
The village experiences a highland climate with:

- Warm summers (June-August)
- Cold winters (December-February)
- Average annual rainfall: 419 mm (16.5 in)
- Average winter snowfall: 200–380 mm (8–15 in)

== Demographics ==
=== Population ===
The population of Chumurkone comprises more than 1,500 households. According to the 2017 Census of Pakistan, the total population was over 10000.

=== Languages ===
- Khowar (primary language)
- Urdu (national language)
- Other regional languages

=== Religion ===
The majority of the population is Muslim.

== History ==
According to local historical accounts, the settlement history of Chumurkone dates back approximately 2,000 years, with evidence of Chinese administration in the region during ancient times. The village has been an important agricultural center in Lower Chitral throughout its history.

=== Cultural Heritage ===
- Traditional architecture
- Local customs and festivals
- Historical sites

== Economy ==
=== Main Economic Activities ===
- Agriculture
- Livestock farming
- Small businesses
- Remittances from urban areas

=== Agriculture ===
Major crops include:

- Wheat
- Maize
- Vegetables
- Fruit orchards

== Infrastructure ==
=== Transportation ===
- Connected to Chitral city via N-45
- Public transport services
- Local taxi services

=== Utilities ===
- Electricity supply
- Water supply system
- Telecommunication services

== Education ==
=== Schools ===
- Government High School Chumurkone
- Hira Model High School Chumurkone
- Eastern Model School Chumurkone

=== Literacy Rate ===
The literacy rate is approximately 78%, with:

- Male literacy: 85%
- Female literacy: 70%

== Healthcare ==
=== Facilities ===
- Private clinics
- Traditional medicine practitioners

== Administration ==
The village is administered under:

- Union Council: Broze
- Tehsil: Chitral
- District: Lower Chitral

== Schools ==
- Govt High School Chumurkone
- Hira Model High School Chumurkone
- Eastern Model School Chumurkone
