= Nizam ul-Mulk (Mehtar of Chitral) =

- The Mehtar of Chitral
- Tenure: 1892-1895
- Predecessor: Mehtar Sher Afzal
- Successor: Mehtar Amir ul-Mulk
- Born: 1861; Chitral
- Died: 1895 (aged 33–34)
- Buried: Chitral
- Residence: Chitral Fort
- Noble family: Kator Dynasty

Nizam ul-Mulk (1 January 1861 – 1 January 1895) was the Mehtar of the princely state of Chitral and ruled it from 1892 until his assassination in 1895.

== Biography ==
He was born as third son of Aman ul-Mulk. Upon his father's death on 30 August 1892, Nizam-ul-Mulk was away from Chitral, serving as the Governor of Yasin. During his absence, his younger brother Afzal ul-Mulk usurped his rightful position and assumed the Mehtarship, which was acknowledged by the Government of India. Nizam-ul-Mulk sought refuge in Gilgit, where he took shelter with the British Agent stationed in the region. The succession passed from Afzal ul-Mulk to his uncle Sher Afzal, whom he drove out of Chitral in 1893, assuming the Mehtarship.

Upon his departure, Colonel Algernon Durand dispatched 2 Kashmir mountain battery guns, 250 rifles of a Kashmir regiment, and 100 Hunza levies (commanded by Humayun Beg) armed with Snider carbines to Gupis, at the mouth of the Yasin Valley, with which he occupied Mastuj. A skirmish near Drasan took place, which ended up in favor of Nizam ul-Mulk, causing Sher Afzal to flee and seek refuge with the Afghan Ispahsalar in Asmar, Kunar province, Afghanistan. Nizam ul-Mulk's first act after assuming power was to send a request to Gilgit that a British mission might visit him without delay. This request was complied with, and in January 1893, a party of four officers, headed by George Robertson and Francis Younghusband, and escorted by fifty rifles of the 15th Sikhs, arrived at Chitral.

He was murdered on 1 January 1895 at Broze while hawking by his younger brother Amir ul-Mulk. Legend has it that during the incident, Nizam ul-Mulk's turban fell off, and as he stopped to pick it up, Amir ul-Mulk attempted to shoot him. Although his shot missed, at a signal from his master, one of his retainers shot Nizam ul-Mulk in the back, causing his immediate death.
