= Shahzada Mohiuddin =

Pakistani politician (1938–2022)

- شہزادہ محی الدین
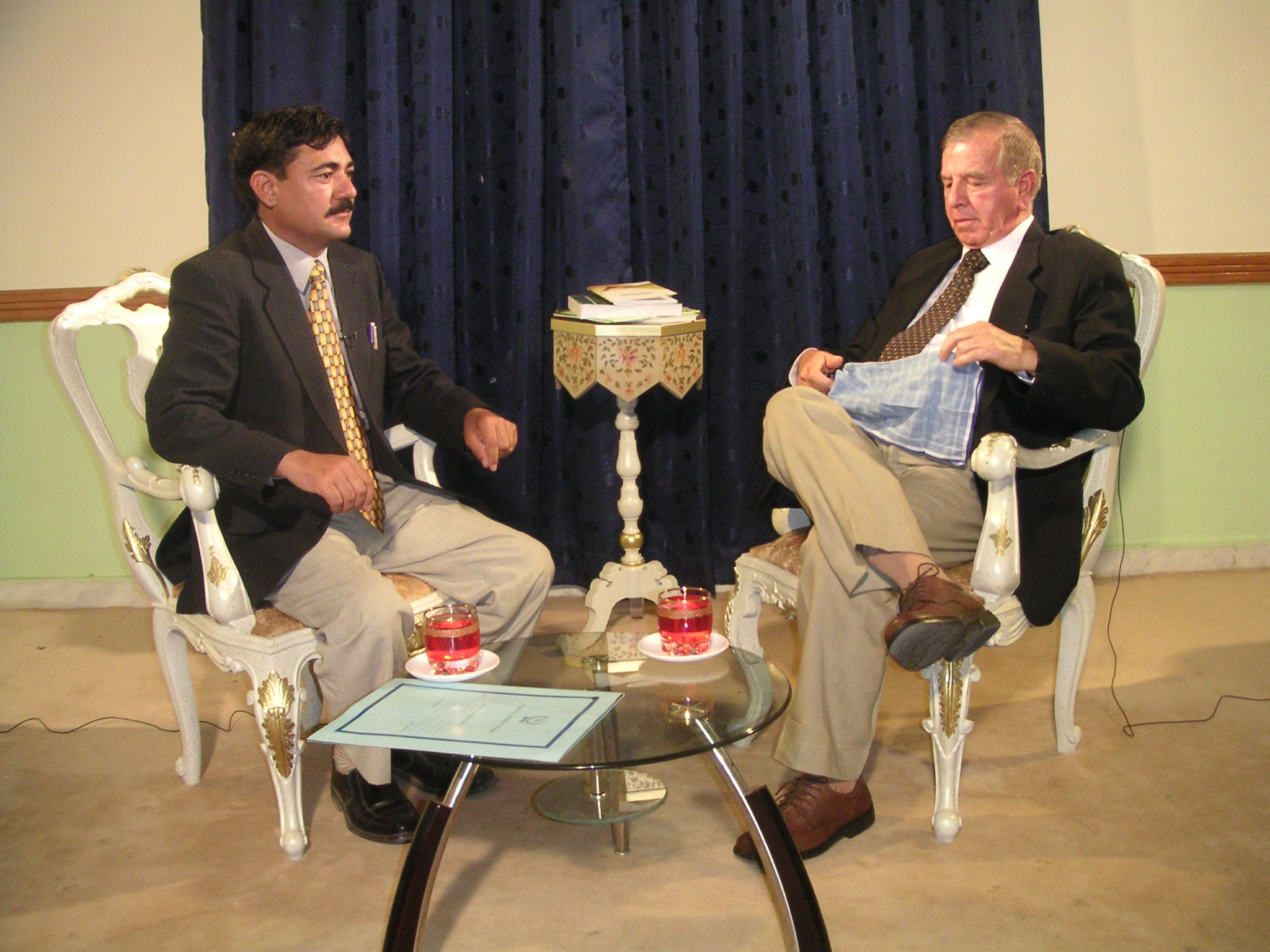
- Shahzada Mohiuddin during TV Programme

Chairman National Assembly Standing Committee on Kashmir Affairs and Northern Areas Member National Assembly Pakistan
- In office 2008–2013
- President: Asif Ali Zardari
- Prime Minister: Raja Pervez Ashraf; Yousaf Raza Gillani

District Nazim Chitral
- In office 2001–2005

Chairman National Assembly Standing Committee on Government Assurances Member National Assembly Pakistan
- In office 1997–1999
- President: Rafiq Tarar; Farooq Leghari
- Prime Minister: Mian Nawaz Sharif

Minister of State for Tourism Member National Assembly Pakistan
- In office 1990–1993
- President: Ghulam Ishaq Khan
- Prime Minister: Mian Nawaz Sharif

Minister of Excise & Taxation
- In office 1990–1990
- Governor: Amir Gulistan Janjua

Chairman District Council Chitral
- In office 1987–1991

Parliamentary Secretary Communications Member National Assembly Pakistan
- In office 1985–1988
- President: Zia-ul-Haq
- Prime Minister: Muhammad Khan Junejo

Chairman District Council Chitral
- In office 1983–1987

Personal details
- Born: Shahzada Mohiuddin; 5 August 1938 Chitral, Chitral
- Died: 27 April 2022 (aged 83) Islamabad, Pakistan
- Resting place: Lower Chitral
- Citizenship: Pakistani
- Children: Shahzada Iftikhar Uddin; Shahzada Khalid Pervaiz Shahzada Sohail Uddin
- Education: Peshawar University
- Occupation: Politician
- Cabinet: Nawaz Sharif Government

Shahzada Mohiuddin (Urdu: شہزادہ محی الدین; 5 August 1938 – 27 April 2022) was a Pakistani politician, a Federal and Provincial Minister, and Member of the National Assembly of Pakistan. He served as Minister of State for Tourism and Chairman National Assembly Standing Committee on Kashmir Affairs and Northern Areas. He was the grandson of Sir Shuja ul-Mulk. His eldest son Shahzada Iftikhar Uddin was elected as the MNA from Chitral in 2013.

== Background ==
Shahzada Mohiuddin was born into the ruling family of Chitral on 5 August 1938. He is the grandson of Sir Shuja ul-Mulk, the Mehtar of Chitral. His family's reign extended from 1571 to 1969, when the Princely State of Chitral was incorporated completely into Pakistan. He completed his Master of Economics from the University of Peshawar in 1963. During his time at University, he was the Captain of East and West Pakistan combined Universities football team. He is the nephew of former Senator Burhan-ud-Din and the father-in-law of Shahzada Masood ul-Mulk.

== Political career ==
Shahzada Mohiuddin entered politics on the Pakistan Peoples Party (PPP) platform in 1972. He was elected Chairman District Council Chitral in 1983 and once again in 1987. Following the 1985 general elections he became a Member of the Parliament, and additionally served as Parliamentary Secretary for Communications till the dissolution of the Assembly. He lost his seat to Nusrat Bhutto in the 1988 general elections but won the National Assembly elections again in 1990. Leading up to the 1990 elections he was appointed Minister for Excise and Taxation in the interim provincial government of NWFP. Following it he was appointed Minister of State for Tourism (1990–1993) in Prime Minister Nawaz Sharif's cabinet. He was again elected as MNA in the general elections of 1997 and served as Chairman National Assembly’s Standing Committee on Government Assurances (1997–1999). Shahzada Mohiuddin was elected as District Nazim of Chitral in the local body elections of 2001. He became a Member of the Parliament for the fourth time in 2008 and was appointed Chairman National Assembly's Standing Committee on Kashmir Affairs and Gilgit-Baltistan. In that capacity he was a proponent of peace and the idea that both countries should promote trade and other means of people-to-people contacts across the Line of Control to pave way for resolving the Kashmir issue.

One of the greatest landmarks in Shahzada Mohiuddin's political career is his work on restarting the Lowari Tunnel Project which has opened avenues of progress and prosperity for the remote district. Due to its geographical situation, Chitral would remain totally cut off from the rest of the country for up to five months every winter due to heavy snowfall on the 10,200-feet-high Lowari Pass; one of the only two land routes connecting the district to other parts of the country. Thousands of people had lost their lives while trying to cross over the Lowari pass. General Pervez Musharraf had sanctioned funds while in power for the Lowari Tunnel project for providing an all-weather road linking Chitral with the rest of Pakistan. In acknowledgement Shahzada Mohiuddin vacated his parliamentary seat in favour of the Former President.

Shahzada Mohiuddin was particular in pursuing infrastructure projects for his constituency. He was an outspoken critic of the PIA management for frequent cancellation of flights on the Peshawar-Chitral route on technical grounds. He mentioned on record that his constituency was remote and poor, consequently he often supported sitting governments just for securing development project and funds for his constituency.

== Retirement from political life ==
Shahzada Mohiuddin retired from active political life after completing his term in 2013. He had dominated politics in the district for well over a quarter of a century. His son Shahzada Iftikhar Uddin contested the general elections in 2013 and won the National Assembly seat in Chitral. Shahzada Mohiuddin died on 27 April 2022, at the age of 83.
