= Mohammad Amjad =

Pakistani politician

Dr. Muhammad Amjad Chaudhry

Minister of Inter Provincial Coordination
- Caretaker
- In office 2007–2008
- President: Pervez Musharraf
- Prime Minister: Muhammad Mian Soomro (Caretaker)

Personal details
- Party: Pakistan Muslim League (Q) (since 2023)
- Other political affiliations: Pakistan Tehreek-e-Insaf (2019-2023); All Pakistan Muslim League (till 2019)
- Occupation: Politician

Dr Muhammad Amjad Chaudhry is a Pakistani politician, an entrepreneur, social worker, and former Federal Minister.

== Career ==
He was the Federal minister for Inter Provincial Coordination during caretaker ministry of Muhammad Mian Soomro's tenure. He also served the Chairman of the political party All Pakistan Muslim League, led by the former President of Pakistan Pervez Musharraf till 2018 and also served as its secretary general as well. On 1 February 2019, he joined Pakistan Tehreek-e-Insaf and has been associated with PTI till 2023.
