= Sher Afzal =

- The Mehtar of Chitral
- Tenure: 1892-1892 (one month)
- Predecessor: Mehtar Afzal ul-Mulk
- Successor: Mehtar Nizam ul-Mulk
- Born: 1841; Chitral
- Died: 1923 (aged 81–82)
- Buried: Chitral
- Residence: Chitral Fort
- Noble family: Kator Dynasty

Sher Afzal (1 January 1841 – 31 December 1923) was a son of Mehtar Shah Muhammad Afzal II of Chitral and a brother of Mehtar Aman ul-Mulk, who lived most of his life in exile in Afghanistan and Badakhshan. He managed to place himself on the Mehtar's seat for a few weeks in the period leading up to the Chitral Expedition.
