= Kho people =

Indo-Aryan ethnic group native to northern Pakistan

Kho
کھو
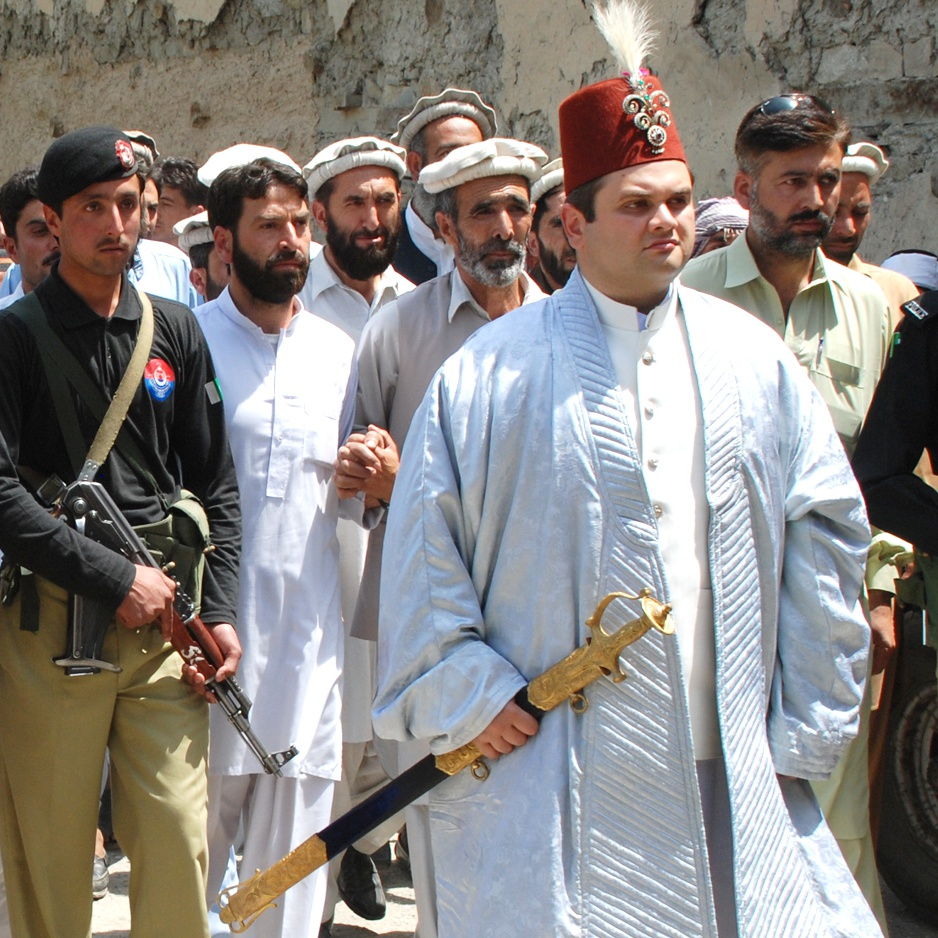
- Chitrali men along with Mehtar Fateh-ul-Mulk Ali Nasir, the current ceremonial head of the Katoor dynasty

Total population
- c. 800,000 (2021)

Regions with significant populations
- Chitral and Gilgit-Baltistan

Languages
- L1: Khowar (native language); L2: Urdu (national language)

Religion
- Islam (majority Sunnism, followed by Isma'ili Shi'ism)

Related ethnic groups
- Other Indo-Aryan peoples

The Kho people (Khowar: کھو, romanized: Khō), (Note: /koʊ/) also known as the Chitralis (Urdu: چترالی, romanized: Citrālī), are an Indo-Aryan ethnic group native to northern Pakistan, specifically the Chitral region of Khyber Pakhtunkhwa, and the Ghizer region of Gilgit-Baltistan. They natively speak Khowar, an Indo-Aryan language belonging to the Dardic family.

== History ==
The Kho people likely spread throughout Chitral from the northern part of the region, specifically from the Mulkhow and Torkhow valleys. According to Morgenstierne, the original abode of the Kho was northern Chitral in the valleys around Mastuj. The Kho started expanding into southern Chitral around the early 14th century under the Rais dynasty. Later on, the Kho expanded eastwards into the Yasin and Ghizer valleys under the Khushwaqt dynasty in the 17th century. They also expanded into Kalasha valleys from the south.

In ancient times the Kho people practised a faith akin to that observed by the Kalash people today. In the 14th century, many of the Kho converted to Islam though some previous customs continue to persist. With respect to Islam, the Kho are primarily Hanafi Sunni Muslims although there exists a substantial population of Isma'ili Muslims in the upper Chitral region.

== Language ==
The Khowar language shares a great number of morphological characteristics with neighbouring Iranian languages of Badakhshan, pointing to a very early location of proto-Khowar in its original abode in Upper Chitral, although from its links with the Gandhari language, it likely came from further south in the first millennium BC, possibly through Swat and Dir.

The ethnologists Karl Jettmar and Lennart Edelberg note the Khowar language to be the most archaic of modern Indic languages, with it "retaining a great part of Sanskrit case inflexion, and retaining many words in a nearly Sanskritic form.”

Khowar is spoken by around 800,000 people in Pakistan. Many of the Kho people also use Urdu as a second language.

== Culture ==
Chitrali folklore lays great emphasis upon supernatural beings, and the area is sometimes called Peristan because of the common belief in fairies (peri) inhabiting the high mountains. The Barmanou is a popular local legend, often referred as the indigenous equivalent of the Yeti of the Himalayas.

Polo is a popular sport and pastime for the Kho people. Polo traditionally played by the Kho has no strict rules or organisation. The Shandur Polo Festival is a sports festival held annually during summer at the Shandur Polo Ground, the world's highest polo ground at an altitude of 3,700 meters (the Shandur Pass itself is at 3,800 meters). The polo tournament is played between the teams of Gilgit-Baltistan and Chitral, under freestyle rules. Kho people also celebrate a spring festival, known as Jashan-e-Qaqlasht, at the Qaqlasht Meadows in Upper Chitral.

Traditional Chitrali clothing includes the shalwar kameez and the pakol (Chitrali hat).

== Genetics ==
According to Aziz et al. 2019, the western Eurasian mtDNA haplogroups were observed predominantly and mostly shared in Kho samples with overall frequency of 50%. These include HV8, H19, H57, H24, C and, C4a haplogroups. The South Asian haplogroups and its relevant subgroups including U4, U4c, U6, U5a, and W were also found in Kho samples with overall 37.5% frequency. Another South Asian haplogroup, M30 was also identified for Kho samples with frequency of 6.2%. The haplogroups and haplotypes specify the origin and linkages of an individual and population. The mtDNA haplogroup analysis eventually demonstrates the western Eurasian ancestral origin of Kho samples. However, the presence of few South Asian haplogroups with a minor proportion revealed that Kho might be an admixed population of western Eurasian and South Asian genetic component.
