= Hidayat ur Rehman =

Pakistani politician

Member of the Provincial Assembly of Khyber Pakhtunkhwa
- In office 13 August 2018 – 18 January 2023
- Constituency: PK-1 (Chitral)

Personal details
- Born: 4 November 1976 (age 49) Chitral, Pakistan
- Party: Jamiat Ulema-e-Islam (F) (2018-present)

Hidayat ur Rehman is a Pakistani politician who was a member of the Provincial Assembly of Khyber Pakhtunkhwa from August 2018 to January 2023.

== Political career ==
He was elected to the Provincial Assembly of Khyber Pakhtunkhwa as a candidate of Muttahida Majlis-e-Amal from Constituency PK-1 (Chitral) in the 2018 Pakistani general election.
