= Torkhow =

Pakistani town and valley

- Location within Pakistan
- Coordinates: 35°33′29″N 71°47′33″E
- Country: Pakistan
- Province: Khyber-Pakhtunkhwa
- District: Lower Chitral
- Elevation: 1,359 m (4,459 ft)
- Time zone: UTC+5 (PST)

Torkhow is a town and tehsil in the Lower Chitral District of Khyber Pakhtunkhwa, Pakistan. Located 108 km from the main city of Chitral, it borders the Wakhan valley of Afghanistan. Shagram is the administrative centre of the valley. The area is home to a Higher Secondary school and Rural Health Centre. Torkhow is also significant as the origin of the Khowar language, which is spoken in Chitral. Most of the villages are situated on the right bank of Torkhow River, with the exception of Washich village, which lies on the left bank.

Villages in Torkhow:

1. Istaru
2. Werkhup
3. Rayeen
4. Merlp
5. Sherjuli
6. Shagram
7. Khot
8. Washich
9. Ujnu
10. Rech
11. Buzund
12. Zanglasht
13. Shotkhar
