= All Pakistan Muslim League =

All Pakistan Muslim League آل پاکستان مسلم لیگ
- Abbreviation: APML
- Chairperson: Jehan Zarin
- Founder: Pervez Musharraf
- Founded: October 1, 2010
- Dissolved: 2023; 3 years ago
- Split from: PML(Q)
- Headquarters: London
- Ideology: Liberalism; Pakistani nationalism; Atlanticism; Islamic democracy; Enlightened moderation; Anti-corruption; Anti-nepotism
- Political position: Centre to centre-right
- Colors: Green
- Slogan: سب سے پہلے پاکستان (lit. 'Pakistan First')

Party flag
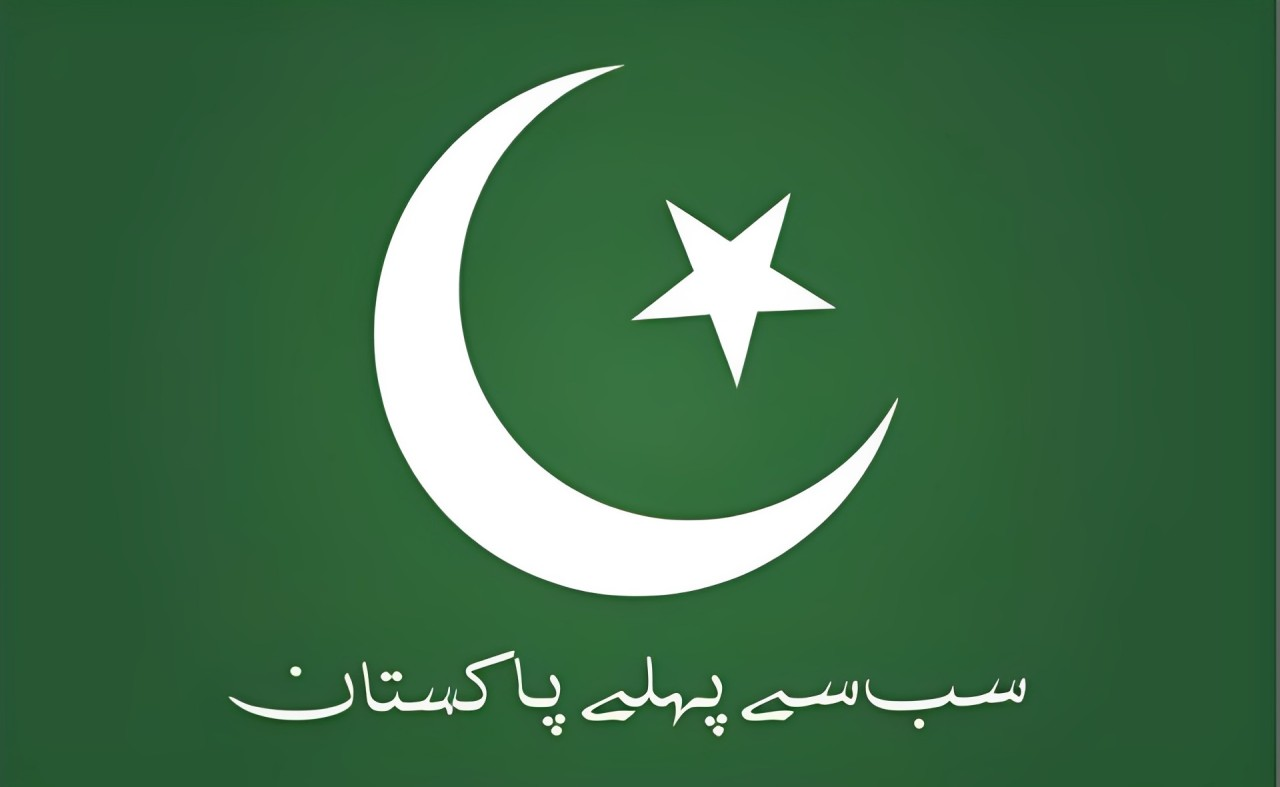

All Pakistan Muslim League (Urdu: آل پاکستان مسلم لیگ; APML) was a political party in Pakistan founded by Pervez Musharraf in 2010. The launching ceremony of the party was held in London, but the central secretariat of APML is located in Karachi, Pakistan. The Election Commission of Pakistan (ECP) announced the de-listing of APML on 13 October 2023. The official notification of its de-listing was issued on 31 October 2023.

== History ==
The party was founded in 2010. It was named after the historical political party of Muslims in British India called the All India Muslim League, which has been credited with gaining independence for Pakistan from British India.

== Electoral history ==
=== National Assembly elections ===
National Assembly
| Election | Votes | % | Seats | +/– |
|---|---|---|---|---|
| 2013 | 54,231 | 0.12% | 1 / 342 | ▲1 |
| 2018 | 36,566 | 0.07% | 0 / 341 | ▼1 |

== Leadership ==
=== Chairmen ===
- Pervez Musharraf (2010-2018)
- Mohammad Amjad (2018)
- Hidayatullah Kheshgi (2019-2022)
- Jehan Zarin (2022-2023)
