= Khowar =

Indo-Aryan language of Pakistan

- کھووار کھوار
- Khowar written in the Khowar alphabet in Nastaliq style.
- Native to: Pakistan
- Region: Chitral
- Ethnicity: Kho people (Chitralis)
- Native speakers: 580,000 (2020)
- Language family: Indo-European: Indo-Iranian; Indo-Aryan; Dardic; Chitrali; Khowar
- Writing system: Perso-Arabic script (Khowar alphabet)

Official status
- Regulated by: Association for the Promotion of Khowar

Language codes
- ISO 639-3: khw
- Glottolog: khow1242
- ELP: Khowar
- Linguasphere: 59-AAB-aa
- Map showing the distribution of the Khowar language

Khowar (کھووار, Khōwār, [kʰɔːwɑːɾ]), also known by its common exonym Chitrali, (Note: Although the term 'Chitrali' is commonly used as an exonym for the Khowar language, amongst linguists it is used to designate of a subgroup within the Dardic Indo-Aryan language family; this subgroup contains the Khowar and Kalasha languages.) is an Indo-Aryan language of the Dardic group, primarily spoken by the Kho people (Chitralis), native to the Chitral region and surrounding areas of Pakistan.

Khowar is the lingua franca of Chitral, and it is also spoken in the Gupis-Yasin and Ghizer districts of Gilgit-Baltistan, as well as in the Upper Swat District.

Speakers of Khowar have also migrated heavily to Pakistan's major urban centres, with Islamabad, Karachi, Lahore and Peshawar having significant populations. It is also spoken as a second language by the Kalash people.

== Names ==
The native name of the language is Khō-wār, meaning "language (wār) of the Kho people". During the British Raj, it was known to the English as Chitrālī (a derived adjective from the name of the Chitral region) or Qāshqārī. Among the Pashtuns and Badakhshanis, it is known as Kashkār. Another name, used by Leitner in 1880, is Arnyiá or Arniya, derived from the Shina language name for the part of the Yasin (a valley in Gilgit-Baltistan) where Khowar is spoken.

== History ==
The Khowar language expanded throughout Chitral from the northern part of the region, specifically from the Mulkhow and Torkhow valleys. According to Morgenstierne, the original abode of the Khowar language was northern Chitral in the valleys around Mastuj. The Khowar language started expanding into southern Chitral around the early 14th century.

Khowar shares a great number of morphological characteristics with neighbouring Iranian languages of Badakhshan, pointing to a very early location of proto-Khowar in its original abode in Upper Chitral, although from its links with the Gandhari language, it likely came from further south in the first millennium BC, possibly through Swat and Dir.

Georg Morgenstierne noted Khowar to be the most archaic of all Indo-Aryan languages in a number of aspects, "retaining a great part of Sanskrit case inflexion, and retaining many words in a nearly Sanskritic form".

== Phonology ==
Khowar has a variety of dialects, which may vary phonemically. The following tables lay out the basic phonology of Khowar.

=== Vowels ===
	Front	Central	Back
Close	i		u
Mid	ɛ		ɔ
Open		ɑ	

Khowar may also have nasalized vowels and a series of long vowels /ɑː/, /ɛː/, /iː/, /ɔː/, and /uː/. Sources are inconsistent on whether length is phonemic, with one author stating "vowel-length is observed mainly as a substitute one. The vowel-length of phonological value is noted far more rarely." Unlike the neighboring and related Kalasha language, Khowar does not have retroflex vowels.

=== Consonants ===
		Labial	Coronal	Retroflex	(Alveolo)- Palatal	Velar	Uvular	Glottal
Nasal		m	n					
Stop	voiceless	p	t	ʈ		k	q	
Stop	voiced	b	d	ɖ		ɡ		
Stop	aspirated	pʰ	tʰ	ʈʰ		kʰ	(qʰ)	
Affricate	voiceless		ts	ʈʂ	tɕ			
Affricate	voiced		dz	ɖʐ	dʑ			
Affricate	aspirated		tsʰ	ʈʂʰ	tɕʰ			
Fricative	voiceless	f	s	ʂ	ɕ	x	(χ)	h
Fricative	voiced		z	ʐ	ʑ	ɣ	(ʁ)	
Approximant		ʋ	l(ʲ) ɫ		j	(w)		
Rhotic			ɾ					

Allophones of /x ɣ h ʋ ɾ/ are heard as sounds [χ ʁ ɦ w ɹ]. /q x ɣ ʑ f/ are restricted to Perso-Arabic loanwords in most IA languages but they occur natively in Khowar, e.g. Sanskrit mukha, yūkā, yákan, bhrāturjāyā; Khowar mux, žuġ, ṣéġun, brežáyu. The original Old Indo-Aryan /s, ʂ, ɕ/ contrast is maintained, e.g. OIA. joṣati, aśru, svásṛ; Kh. ǰoṣík, aśrú, ispusár. The OIA kṣ became c̣/c̣h e.g. OIA. pakṣa, Kh. poc̣ and more sibilants were made instead of a reduction which Continental IA did, e.g. OIA. gaḍa, Kh. goẓ. OIA cluster ts was either preserved as a single phoneme ċ/ċh or merged with some other consonant OIA. vatsa, matsya, uts Kh. bac̣hóɫ, maċhí, uċ.

=== Tone ===
In Khowar, a low-rising pitch, accompanied by extended duration (length) contrasts with high-falling pitch in a small number of pairs. This is found mostly with monosyllabic words; however, some disyllabic words too contrast only in pitch contour, with consequent vowel elongation; for example sarék 'the narrow end of an egg', with stressed non-lengthened vowel, and sareék 'to seem/appear', with low tone and lengthened /e/; and išpén 'portion given by someone from his own share to someone of equal or lower status' and išpeén 'species of bush'.

== Orthography ==
Khowar orthography is derived from Urdu alphabet, with additional letters created to represent sounds unique to Khowar. Similar to Urdu, Khowar is typically written in the calligraphic Nastaʿlīq script.

From the end of the 19th century onwards, literaturists and rulers of Chitral princely state have put in much effort to popularize literacy, reading, and writing in Khowar. Initially, Mirza Muhammad Shakur and Prince Tajumal Shah Mohfi adopted Persian alphabet, used in neighbouring Afghanistan. However, Persian alphabet did not have letters for many unique sounds in Khowar. By the early 20th century, as under British Colonial rule, Urdu education and literacy became ever more popular among Indian Muslims (see Hindi–Urdu controversy), Chitrali literaturists, namely Sir Nasir ul-Mulk and Mirza Muhammad Ghafran saw Urdu script as a better fit for Khowar. Nonetheless, Urdu also lacked sounds that existed in Chitrali. Thus, new letters were proposed and created. But the process of settling on a standard Khowar script continued for decades into the 1970s. This process was not without controversy either. Some literaturists were advocating for keeping the number of letters to a minimum, or in other words removing Arabic letters that do not represent distinct sounds in Khowar and are homophone with other letters (for example ث، ذ، ص, being homophone with س، ز، س respectively). In total, 6 new letters were added to the 37-letter Urdu Alphabet, to create the 43-letter Khowar script.

== Grammar ==
=== Nouns ===
Khowar nouns inflect based on animacy, number, and case.

==== Animacy ====
The three gender system from Old Indo-Aryan has been replaced with an animacy-based noun classification system in Khowar.

==== Number ====
The direct case plural is usually marked only on animate nouns.

==== Case ====
All Khowar nouns have four case forms, direct, oblique, ablative, and vocative. Inanimate nouns additionally have forms for instrumental, and four different locative cases. The locative 1 expresses pointlike locations as opposed to those having linear extent. The locative 2 expresses horizontal motion or location. The locative 3 expresses upward motion or location, while the locative 4 expresses downward motion or location.

Case endings
Case	Singular		Plural	
Case	animate	inanimate	animate	inanimate
direct	Ø, or -án	Ø	-án, -gíni, or reduplication	Ø, (-án)
oblique	-o	-o	-an	-an
locative 1	—N/a	-a	—N/a	-en
locative 2	—N/a	-i	—N/a	-en
locative 3	—N/a	-tu	—N/a	-en
locative 4	—N/a	-o	—N/a	-en
instrumental	—N/a	-en	—N/a	-en
ablative	-ar ~ -ári	-ar	-ar ~ -ári	-ar ~ -ári
vocative	-é, -aá (for God)		-án (used with voc particle é: ‘hey, o’ ...)	

=== Pronouns ===
Only the first and second person pronouns have distinct direct and oblique forms.

First and second person pronouns
Case	Singular		Plural	
Case	1st	2nd	1st	2nd
Direct	aʋá	tu	ispá	pisá
Oblique	ma	ta	ispá	pisá

Interrogative and indefinite pronouns are closely related and mostly homophonous.

Interrogative and indefinite pronouns
Case	Pronominal		Adjectival	
Case	Interrogative	Indefinite	Interrogative	Indefinite
Direct	ka ‘who?’	kaá ‘someone’	kos ‘whose’, ‘whom’	kos di ‘whosever’, ‘whomever’
Oblique	kos ‘whom?’	kos ‘someone’	kos ‘whose’, ‘whom’	kos di ‘whosever’, ‘whomever’
Direct	kyá ‘what?’	kya ‘some’; ‘any’ (in negative contexts)	kya ‘what’	kya ‘a’, ‘some’
Oblique	khyo ‘what?’		kya ‘what’	kya ‘a’, ‘some’
Direct	kyaγ ‘what?’	kyaáγ ‘something	kya ‘what’	kya ‘a’, ‘some’, ‘any’
Oblique	khyo ‘what?’	khyo ‘something’	kya ‘what’	kyá.di ‘any’
Direct	kí ‘which one?’	kiʋál(u~i) di ‘whichever one’	kí ‘which? (out of a specific set)’	kya ‘a’, ‘some’, ‘any’
Oblique	kí ‘which one?’	kiʋálo di ‘whichever one’	khyo ‘what?’	kyá.di ‘any’

Demonstrative pronouns in Khowar display a three-term deictic system based on distance and visibility: proximal (+ near, + visible), distal (Ø near, Ø visible), and remote (− near, − visible). They have both a basic and extended form which is formed with h(a). The emphatic form is usually used when something is mentioned for the first time.

Demonstrative pronouns
	Singular		Plural	
	Direct	Oblique	Direct	Oblique
Proximal	(ha)yá ‘he’, ‘she’, ‘it’; ‘this person/thing’	(ha)mó ‘him’, ‘her’, ‘it’; ‘his’, ‘hers’, ‘its’	(ha)mít ‘they’, ‘these people/things’	(ha)mítan ‘them’; ‘theirs’
Distal	(h)es ‘he’, ‘she’, ‘it’, ‘that one’	(h)oró ‘him’, ‘her’, ‘it’; ‘his’‘hers’, ‘its’	(h)et ‘they’, ‘those people/things	(h)étan ‘them’; ‘theirs’
Remote	(ha)sé ‘he’, ‘she’, ‘it’; ‘that one’	(ha)toγó ~ (ha)toó ‘him’, ‘her’, ‘it’; ‘his’, ‘hers’, ‘its’	(ha)tét ‘they’	(ha)tétan ‘them’; ‘theirs’

== See also ==
- Khoshey people

== Bibliography ==
- Morgenstierne, Georg (1936). "Iranian Elements in Khowar". Bulletin of the School of Oriental and African Studies. VIII. London.
- Morgenstierne, Georg (1947). "Some Features of Khowar Morphology". Norsk Tidsskrift for Sprogvidenskap. XIV. Oslo.
- Morgenstierne, Georg (1957). "Sanskritic Words in Khowar". Felicitation Volume Presented to S. K. Belvalkar. Benares. pp. 84–98. [Reprinted in Morgenstierne (1973), Irano-Dardica, pp. 267–272.]
- Sloan, Mohammad Ismail (1981). Khowar-English Dictionary. Peshawar. ISBN 0-923891-15-3.
- Decker, Kendall D. (1992). Languages of Chitral. Sociolinguistic Survey of Northern Pakistan. Vol. 5. Islamabad: National Institute of Pakistan Studies, Quaid-i Azam University and Summer Institute of Linguistics. ISBN 969-8023-15-1.
- L'Homme, Erik (1999). Parlons Khowar: Langue et culture de l'ancien royaume de Chitral au Pakistan. Paris: L'Harmattan.
- Bukhari, Badshah Munir (2001). Khowar language. Pakistan: University publisher.
- Bashir, Elena (2001). "Spatial Representation in Khowar". Proceedings of the 36th Annual Meeting of the Chicago Linguistic Society. Chicago: Chicago Linguistic Society.
- Jain, Danesh; Cardona, George (2007). The Indo-Aryan Languages. Routledge. ISBN 978-1-135-79711-9.
- "Cultural diversity of Chitral". Chitral Today. June 2015.
- Strand, Richard F. (2022). "Phonatory Location in the Far North-Western Indo-Âryan Languages". In Baart, Joan L.G.; Liljegren, Henrik; Payne, Thomas E. (eds.). Languages of Northern Pakistan: Essays in Memory of Carla Radloff. Karachi: Oxford University Press. pp. 446–495.
- Bashir, Elena (2025). A Grammar of Khowar: Descriptive and comparative analysis. London: UCL Press. doi:10.14324/111.9781800088177.
