= Chitral District =

Former district of Khyber Pakhtunkhwa, Pakistan; 1969–2018

Coordinates: 36°15′N 72°15′E

Chitral District ݯھیترارو ضلع ضلع چترال
- District of Pakistan
- 1947–2018
- Map of the former district in Khyber Pakhtunkhwa
- Capital: Chitral town
- Demonym: Chitralis
- Area
  - 1947–2018: 14,850 km^{2} (5,730 sq mi)
- Population
  - 1947–2018: 414,000
- Government
  - Type: District Government
- History
  - Established: 14 August 1947
  - Establishment of Lower and Upper Chitral: 20 July 2018
- Political subdivisions: 6 Tehsils
Preceded by	Succeeded by
Chitral State	Lower Chitral; Upper Chitral
- Today part of: Pakistan · Lower Chitral & Upper Chitral Districts of Khyber Pakhtunkhwa

Chitral District (Khowar: ݯھیترارو ضلع; Urdu: ضلع چترال) was a district in the Malakand Division of the Pakistani province of Khyber Pakhtunkhwa from 14 August 1947 to 2018. It was the northernmost and the largest district of the province, covering an area of 14,850 km^{2}, before the district was split in two forming the new districts of Upper Chitral and Lower Chitral.

It shared district borders with Swat and Dir to the south, a provincial border with Gilgit-Baltistan to the east and the Durand Line as international border with Afghanistan to the north and west. Afghanistan's narrow strip of Wakhan Corridor separated Chitral from Tajikistan in the north.

== History ==
Chitral shared much of its history and culture with the neighbouring Hindu Kush territories of Gilgit-Baltistan, a region sometimes called "Peristan" because of the common belief in fairies (peri) inhabiting the high mountains.

The entire region that formed the Chitral District was an independent monarchical state until 1895, when the British negotiated a treaty with its hereditary ruler, the Mehtar, under which Chitral became a semi-autonomous princely state within the Indian Empire. The princely state of Chitral retained this status even after its accession to Pakistan in 1947, finally being made an administrative district of Pakistan on 14 August 1947, disestablishing the Princely State.

== Topography and access ==
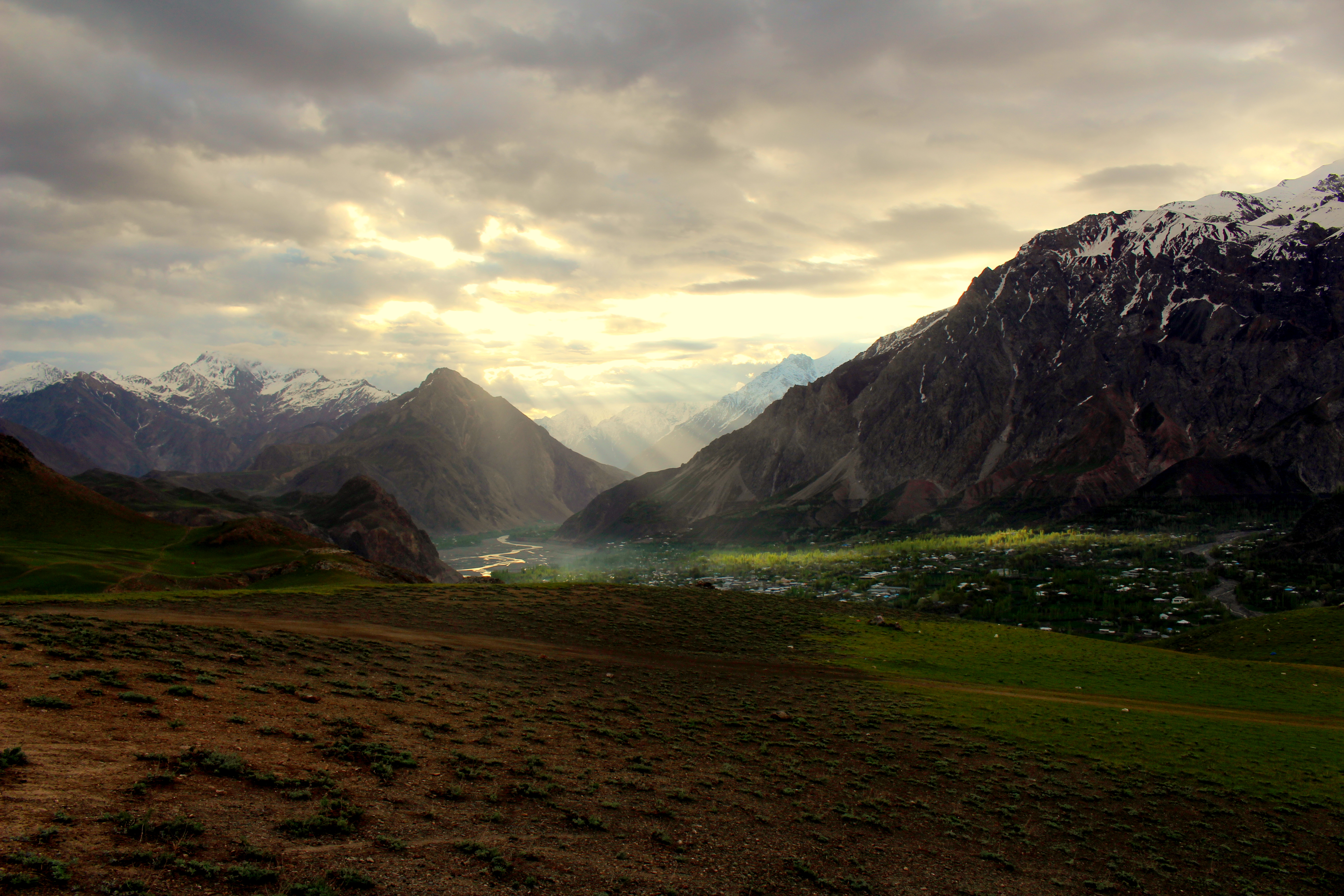
Qaqlasht Meadows above Buni

Chitral was counted amongst the highest regions of the world, sweeping from 1,094 metres at Arandu to 7,726 metres at Tirichmir and packing over 40 peaks more than 6,100 metres in height. The terrain of Chitral was very mountainous, and Tirich Mir (7708 m), the highest peak of the Hindu Kush, rises in the north of the former district. Around 4.8 percent of the land was covered by forest, and 76 percent was mountains and glaciers.

Chitral was connected to the rest of Pakistan by two major road routes, the Lowari Pass from Dir and Shandur Top (elevation 3718.56 m) from Gilgit. Both routes used to be closed in winter, but circa 2017 the highway Lowari Tunnel under the Lowari Pass opened to vehicular traffic for at least ten hours per day. A number of other high passes, including Darkot Pass, Thoi Pass, and Zagaran Pass, provided access on foot to Chitral from Gilgit-Baltistan.

- Arandu Pass, on the border between Pakistan and Afghanistan
- Broghol Pass, on the border between Pakistan and Afghanistan
- Dorah Pass, on the border between Pakistan and Afghanistan
- Darkot Pass, on the border between Chitral and Gupis-Yasin District
- Shandur Pass, on the border between Chitral and Gilgit-Baltistan
- Lowari Pass, on the border between Chitral and upper Dir
- Lowari Tunnel, highway under Lowari Pass
- Thoi Pass, on the border between Chitral and Gilgit-Baltistan
- Zagaran Pass, on the border between Chitral and Gilgit-Baltistan

== Demographics ==
The district had a population of about 414,000. The general population was mainly made up of Kho people, who speak Khowar, which is also spoken in parts of Yasin, Gilgit, Dir, and Swat. Chitral was also home to the Kalash tribe, who live in Bumburet and two other remote valleys southwest of Chitral town. A few thousand Nuristani people were also known to live in Chitral.

The main language of the region is Khowar. There are also smaller communities of speakers of Dameli, Gawar-Bati, Gujari, Kalasha, Kyrgyz, Katë, Madaklashti, Palula, Sarikoli, Shughni, Wakhi, and Yidgha. Urdu has official status.

== Chitral town ==
The town of Chitral in the district is served as capital. It is situated on the west bank of the Chitral River (also known as the Kunar River) at the foot of Tirich Mir, which at 7,708 m (25,289 ft) is the highest peak of the Hindu Kush. Formerly it served as the capital of the princely state of Chitral and now it has this role for the succeeding Lower Chitral district.

== Administration ==
The district of Chitral was divided into twenty-four union councils and two tehsils:

- Chitral
- Mastuj

=== National Assembly ===
This district was represented by one elected MNA (Member of the National Assembly) in Pakistan National Assembly. Its constituency was NA-1.

Member of National Assembly	Party affiliation	Year
Abdul Akbar Khan	Muttahida Majlis-e-Amal	2002
Shahzada Mohiuddin	Pakistan Muslim League	2008
Shahzada Iftikhar Uddin	All Pakistan Muslim League	2013

=== Provincial Assembly ===
The district was represented by two elected MPAs in the provincial assembly, who represented the following constituencies:

- PK-2 (Chitral-I)
- PK-1 (Chitral-II)

== Valleys ==
Chitral District is divided into over 35 small valleys

- Kalash valleys
- Garam Chashma
- Shishi Koh
- Mastuj
- Laspur
- Yarkhoon valley

== Villages ==
- Brun
- Chumurkone
- Kuragh
