= Chitral =

Town in Khyber Pakhtunkhwa, Pakistan

Chitral: ݯھیترار; چترال
- Town
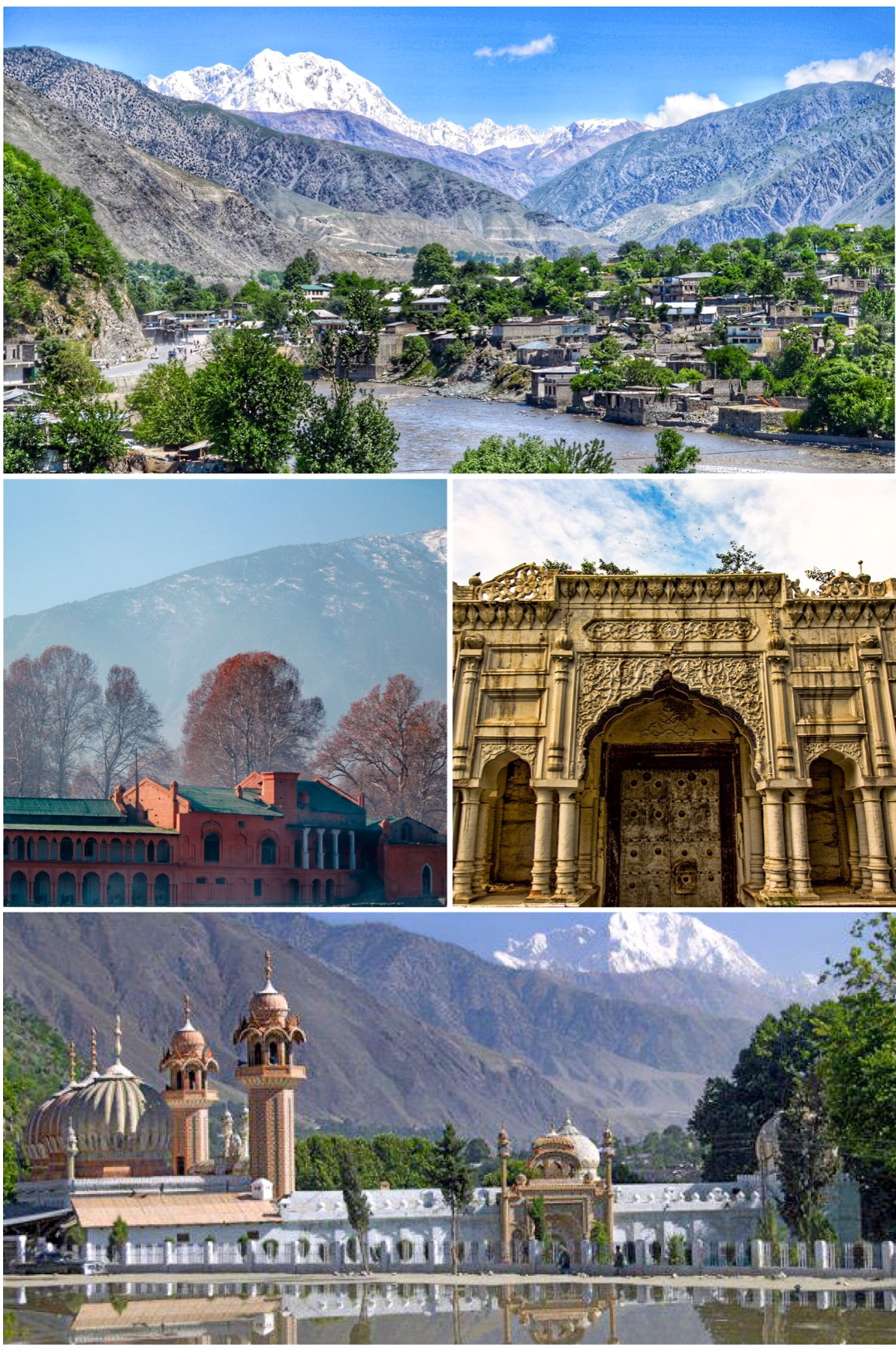
- Clockwise from top: View of Chitral Valley and Tirich Mir; Shahi Qilla; Shahi Mosque; Chitral Fort
- Nickname: Qāshqār
- Location within Khyber Pakhtunkhwa Location within Pakistan
- Coordinates: 35°50′46″N 71°47′09″E
- Country: Pakistan
- Province: Khyber Pakhtunkhwa
- District: Lower Chitral
- Established: 1885; 141 years ago
- Founder: British government
- Named for: Field

Government
  - Type: Municipal Corporation
  - Body: District Government
  - Mayor (Lower Chitral): Shahzada Aman Ur Rehman (PTI)
- Elevation: 1,494 m (4,902 ft)

Population (2023)
  - Total: 57,157
- Demonym: Chitralis

Languages
  - Official: Urdu; English
  - Regional: Khowar (Chitrali)
- Time zone: UTC+5:00 (Pakistan Standard Time)
- Zip Code: 17200
- Area code: 0943
- Vehicle registration: CL
- Website: lowerchitral.kp.gov.pk

Chitral (Urdu: چترال, Khowar: ݯھیترار, romanized: ćhitrār, lit. 'field') is a town situated on the Chitral River in the northern part of Khyber Pakhtunkhwa province, Pakistan. It serves as the capital of the Lower Chitral District, and was previously the capital of Chitral District, and before that, the capital of Chitral state, which was dissolved and made an administrative unit of West Pakistan between 1969 and 1972.

== History ==
=== Ancient period ===
A definitive record of the earliest settlers of the region does not exist. The existence of the Gandharan Grave Culture in Chitral, attested in various grave sites scattered over its valleys provides an insight into its early inhabitants following the Indo-Aryan migrations, after the decline of Indus Valley Civilisation. The Gankorineotek cemetery in Singoor is home to several ancient burial sites, dating back to the Vedic period. In the 2nd century CE, the Chitral Valley was a part of the Kushan Empire under Kanishka. Under the Kushans, many Buddhist monuments were built around the area, mainly Buddhist stupas and monasteries. The Kushans also patronised Buddhist art; some of the finest examples of the image of Buddha were produced in the region under the Kushan rule.

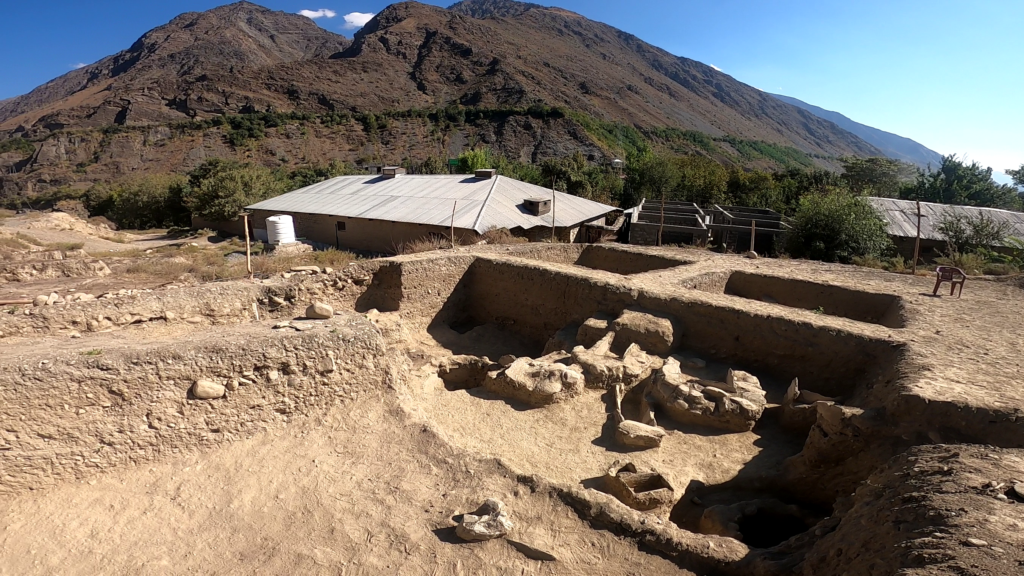
Gankoreneotek Grave in Singoor.

=== Dynastic period ===
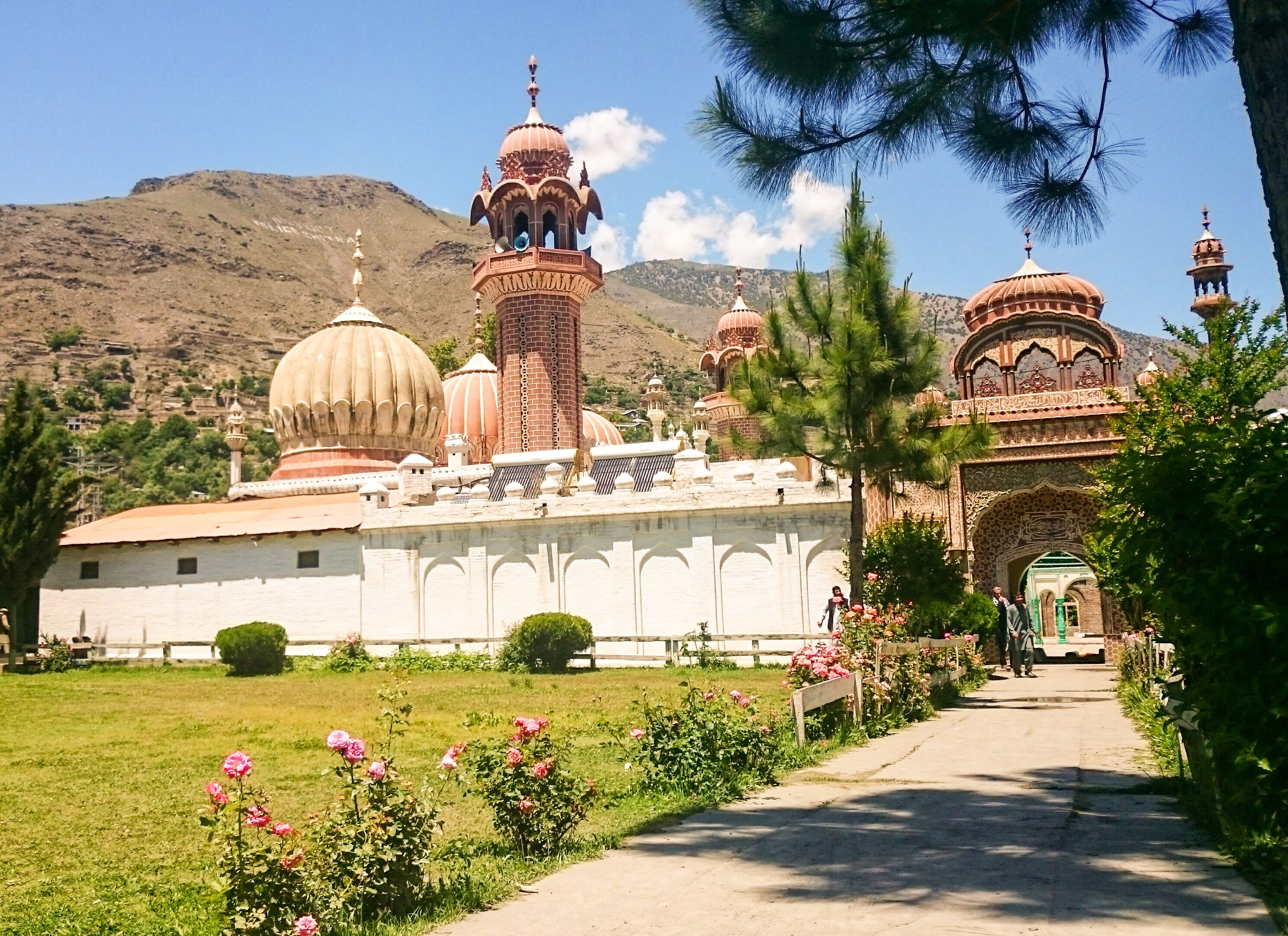
Shahi Mosque, Chitral

Raís dynasty began to rule over Chitral in 1320, which came to an end in the 15th century. From 1571 onwards Chitral was the capital of the kingdom of Chitral under the rule of the Katūr dynasty. The British garrison faced a month-long siege at Chitral Fort by the Chitralis in 1895 during the Chitral Expedition. The garrison was relieved after six weeks, and the British installed the young Shuja ul-Mulk as mehtar (ruler). He ruled for the next 41 years.

=== Post-independence period ===
In 1947, following the partition of the British India, the princely states were given the choice to either remain independent or accede to one of the two new dominions. Initially, Chitral chose to remain an independent monarchy. Later, the mehtar of Chitral, acceded to Pakistan and thus Chitral became one of the princely states of Pakistan. Between 1969 to 1972, it was fully integrated into Pakistan as the administrative district of Chitral.

==== Role in the First Kashmir War ====
Chitral played an instrumental role in the 1947–1948 first Kashmir war. Immediately after acceding to Pakistan, the mehtar Muzaffar ul-Mulk proclaimed jihad to liberate Kashmir from the Dogras. At this point, the Gilgit Scouts were forced to retreat and the Dogra forces had made gains in the Burzil Pass. Under these circumstances, the Chitral Scouts relieved the Gilgit Scouts in Domel and Kamri sectors whilst the Chitral Bodyguard force went towards Skardu. The Chitral Bodyguard under the leadership of Chitrali prince Mata ul-Mulk led a prolonged siege of Skardu, which saw the surrender of the Dogras and Baltistan becoming part of Northern Areas.

== Geography and climate ==
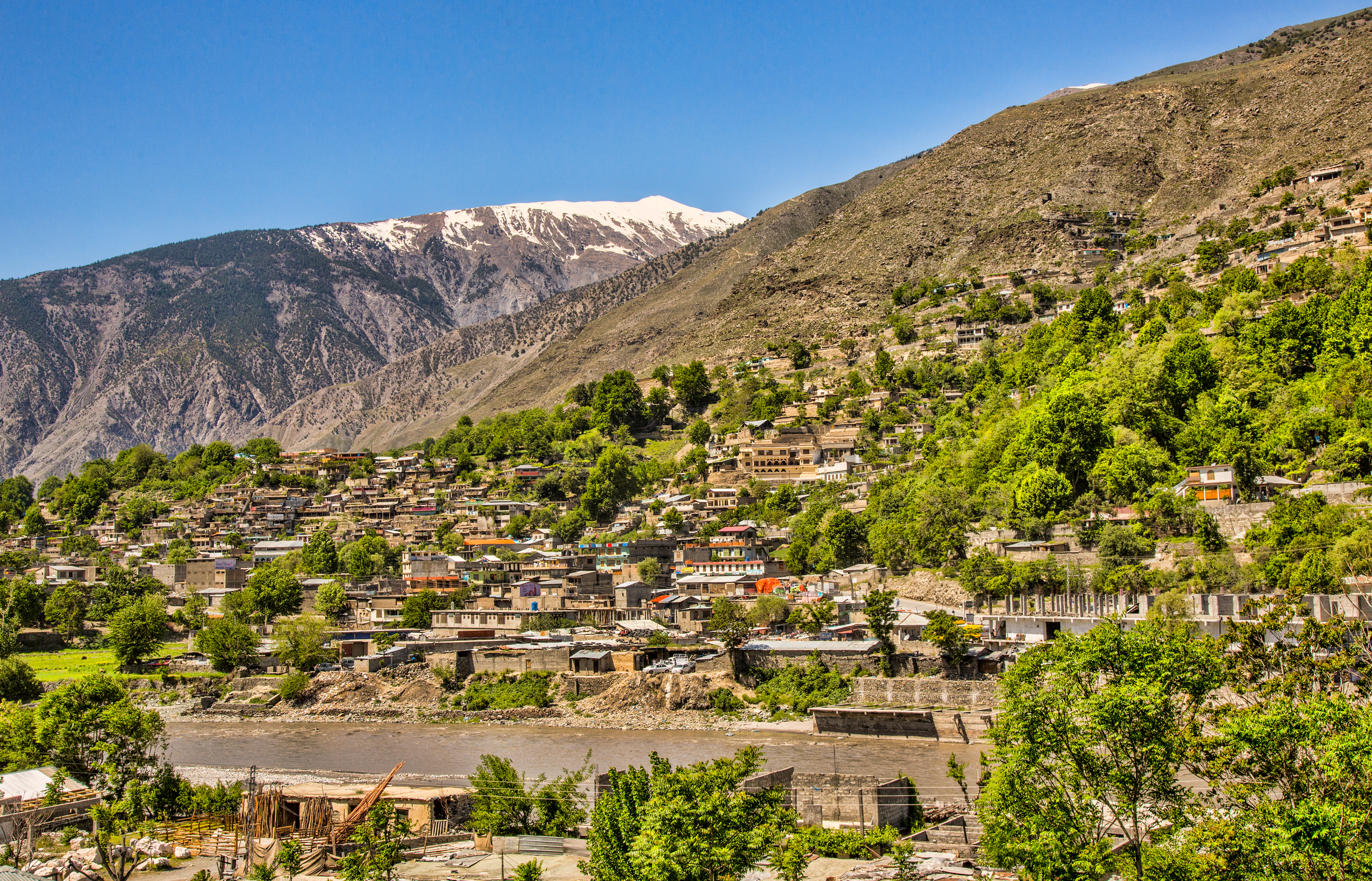
Chitral city

The city has an average elevation of 1,500 m (4,921 ft).

In contrast to more southerly valleys of Khyber Pakhtunkhwa, Chitral has a dry Mediterranean climate (Köppen Csa) with almost no rainfall during the very hot summers. Precipitation occurs mainly from spring thunderstorms brought about by western frontal systems. In the winter the nighttime temperature occasionally drops to −10 °C. Winter snowfall in the town can be quite heavy with an accumulation of up to 60 cm being quite common, at higher elevations snowfall can reach as high as 20 metres (70 ft).

Climate data for Chitral, Khyber Pakhtunkhwa
Month	Jan	Feb	Mar	Apr	May	Jun	Jul	Aug	Sep	Oct	Nov	Dec	Year
Record high °C (°F)	16.9 (62.4)	21.0 (69.8)	28.0 (82.4)	34.3 (93.7)	38.3 (100.9)	42.5 (108.5)	44.4 (111.9)	42.2 (108.0)	39.8 (103.6)	34.4 (93.9)	27.0 (80.6)	20.7 (69.3)	44.4 (111.9)
Mean daily maximum °C (°F)	8.8 (47.8)	9.9 (49.8)	15.1 (59.2)	22.5 (72.5)	28.2 (82.8)	34.4 (93.9)	35.9 (96.6)	34.4 (93.9)	31.1 (88.0)	25.1 (77.2)	18.7 (65.7)	11.6 (52.9)	23.0 (73.4)
Daily mean °C (°F)	4.1 (39.4)	5.3 (41.5)	9.6 (49.3)	15.5 (59.9)	20.3 (68.5)	26.1 (79.0)	28.0 (82.4)	26.5 (79.7)	22.1 (71.8)	16.2 (61.2)	10.8 (51.4)	5.9 (42.6)	15.9 (60.6)
Mean daily minimum °C (°F)	−0.6 (30.9)	0.6 (33.1)	4.2 (39.6)	8.5 (47.3)	12.5 (54.5)	17.8 (64.0)	20.2 (68.4)	18.7 (65.7)	13.1 (55.6)	7.2 (45.0)	2.9 (37.2)	0.2 (32.4)	8.8 (47.8)
Record low °C (°F)	−11.0 (12.2)	−11.0 (12.2)	−3.7 (25.3)	0.0 (32.0)	4.4 (39.9)	8.9 (48.0)	11.1 (52.0)	10.6 (51.1)	5.6 (42.1)	1.1 (34.0)	−3.0 (26.6)	−12.2 (10.0)	−12.2 (10.0)
Average precipitation mm (inches)	38.4 (1.51)	63.8 (2.51)	97.3 (3.83)	71.7 (2.82)	43.9 (1.73)	5.1 (0.20)	4.9 (0.19)	8.0 (0.31)	7.3 (0.29)	15.6 (0.61)	20.4 (0.80)	38.5 (1.52)	414.9 (16.32)
Mean monthly sunshine hours	134.0	133.7	150.4	188.6	247.0	286.3	285.4	258.6	231.0	214.0	182.5	130.7	2,442.2
Source: NOAA (1971-1990)

== Demographics ==
Historical population
Year	Pop.	±% p.a.
1951	...	—
1961	...	—
1972	13,376	—
1981	...	—
1998	30,622	—
2017	49,794	+2.59%
2023	57,157	+2.33%

As of the 2023 census, Chitral has a population of 57,157.

According to the 1981 census, Khowar is the main language and is spoken by 98% of the population. Kalasha is also spoken by a small population. Urdu is the official language of the city.

Religion in the town of Chitral
Religion	Population (1901)	Percentage (1901)
Islam	3,452	42.47%
Hinduism	2,709	33.33%
Sikhism	1,826	22.47%
Total	8,128	100%

== Educational institutions ==
- University of Chitral

== See also ==
- Chitral Tehsil

== Bibliography ==
- Decker, D. Kendall (1992). Languages of Chitral. Ishi Press International. ISBN 4871875202.
- Durand, Algernon (1899). The Making of a frontier.
- Leitner, G. W. (1893). Dardistan in 1866, 1886 and 1893: Being An Account of the History, Religions, Customs, Legends, Fables and Songs of Gilgit, Chilas, Kandia (Gabrial) Yasin, Chitral, Hunza, Nagyr and other parts of the Hindukush, as also a supplement to the second edition of The Hunza and Nagyr Handbook. And An Epitome of Part III of the author's The Languages and Races of Dardistan (First reprint ed.). New Delhi: Manjusri Publishing House. ISBN 4871877787.
