= Suri Jagek =

Meteorological and astronomical system of the Kalash people

Suri Jagek, meaning "observing the sun" in the Kalasha language, is a traditional meteorological and astronomical knowledge system practiced by the Kalasha people in the Hindu Kush mountain range. It involves observing the sun, moon, stars, and shadows in relation to local topography. This system, based on empirically observed knowledge, helps predict the best times for sowing seeds, managing animal husbandry, and preparing for natural disasters. It also governs the Kalasha calendar, determining dates for social events, festivals, feasts, and religious ceremonies.

== Overview ==
Suri Jagek entails studying the sun, moon, stars, and shadows in connection with the surrounding landscape. It relies on empirical observations to forecast optimal periods for planting seeds, overseeing livestock, and preparing for natural disasters. It also regulates the Kalasha calendar, establishing dates for social gatherings, festivals, feasts, and religious rituals.

Suri Jagek reflects the Kalasha people's deep connection with their environment and the importance of their geographical context in sustaining their way of life. The knowledge is passed down through oral traditions, including folk stories, songs, proverbs, and rhetoric. Some aspects, like using shadow studies for cattle rearing, are being adapted for modern society. However, with the rise of digital technologies, there is a growing preference for more modern methods of weather prediction.

The observatories used for Suri Jagek, known as Suri Jagaekein, are situated in villages across the Mumuret (Bumburet), Biriu (Birir), and Rukmu (Rumbur) valleys in the Hindu Kush range.

== History ==
=== Inclusion in UNESCO's 2018 Intangible Cultural Heritage list ===
In 2018, the United Nations Educational, Scientific and Cultural Organisation (UNESCO) approved the inclusion of Suri Jagek in the year's list of Intangible Cultural Heritage (ICH). The decision was made during the 13th session of UNESCO's Inter-governmental Committee for Safeguarding the Intangible Cultural Heritage in Port Louis, Mauritius. The committee accepted Pakistan's nomination, recognizing Suri Jagek as a vital component of the traditional luni-solar calendar.

=== Threats ===
Despite remaining an oral tradition, younger generations lack awareness of its cultural significance and practical benefits. Community members attribute this to the educational curriculum and pedagogy in schools, which they feel have alienated them from their own cultural heritage.

Despite their cultural significance, the ancient observatories used for Suri Jagek face threats from increased construction within the Kalasha valleys, putting them at risk. For example, the Suri Jagaekein in Balanguru (Rumbur) and Guru (Birir) villages have been obstructed by structures and trees, making it difficult to observe the rising sun.

== See also ==
- List of Intangible Cultural Heritage elements in Pakistan
- Hindu calendar
