= Chawmos =

Festival of the Kalash people

Chawmos (cawmōs, ghona chawmos yat, Khowar "chitrimas" from cāturmāsyá, CDIAL 4742) is a festival of the Kalash people of Pakistan. It is also sometimes spelled chaumos. It is celebrated for two weeks at winter solstice (Dec. 7-22), at the beginning of the month chawmos mastruk in two weeks.

Chawmos is celebrated without musical instruments in the Rumbur and Bumborate villages but with instruments in Birir village. Chawmos comes after the Kalash finish their fieldwork and store their cheese, fruit, vegetables and grains for the year.

== Rituals ==
The first week of Chawmos (7-14 December) is for the Kalash people only. Kalash girls select their bridegrooms after some rituals. The entire population remains indoors. It is celebrated by feasting until the elders, who sit on a hilltop, watching the sun reaching the orbit, declare the advent of the New Year. Children go up to the mountain, where they divide into boys and girls, and respectively make a big bonfire.

In the second week of Chawmos (15-22 December), the people thank their god with dance and music. This part of festival is public. It involves much music and dancing, and the sacrifice of many goats. It is dedicated to the god Balimain who is believed to visit from the mythical homeland of the Kalash, Tsyam (Tsiyam, tsíam), for the duration of the feast. Food sacrifices are offered at the clans' Jeshtak shrines, dedicated to the ancestors.

At Chawmos, impure and uninitiated persons are not admitted; they must be purified by a waving a fire brand over women and children and by a special fire ritual for men, involving a shaman waving juniper brands over the men. The 'old rules' of the gods (Devalog, dewalōk) are no longer in force, as is typical for year-end and carnival-like rituals.

'The main Chawmos ritual takes place at a Tok tree, a place called Indra's place, "indrunkot", or "indréyin". Indrunkot is sometimes believed to belong to Balumain's brother, In(dr), lord of cattle. Ancestors, impersonated by young boys (ōnjeṣṭa 'pure') are worshipped and offered bread; they hold on to each other and form a chain (cf. the Vedic anvārambhaṇa) and snake through the village.

The men must be divided into two parties: the pure ones have to sing the well-honored songs of the past, but the impure sing wild, passionate, and obscene songs, with an altogether different rhythm. This is accompanied by a 'sex change': men dress as women, women as men (Balumain also is partly seen as female and can change between both forms at will).

During the Chawmos prayers, a procession goes to a high plateau outside the village in Balangkuru where a long night of dancing begins. The festivals continue for many more days, moving on to different locations within the valleys. It is the most exciting among all the festivals. Girls dance in cold weather and snowfall and boys play various winter games in the festival. Tourists rarely visit the festival due to blockage of roads and heavy snowfall.

== See also ==
- Cattle in religion and mythology
- Chaman
