= Ayun =

Ayun may refer to:

- 'Ayūn, a component or Arabic placenames meaning springs, fountains, sources
- An alternative form of El Aaiún, a city in Western Sahara
- Ayun (woreda), a district of Somali Region, Ethiopia
- Ayun, Chitral, a valley in Lower Pakistan
- Ayun Halliday (born 1965), American writer and actor

== See also ==
- Aioun (disambiguation)
- El Aioun (disambiguation)
