= Pakistanis =

People of Pakistan

پاكِستانى قوم pākistānī qaum
- Flag of Pakistan

Total population
- 252.3 million (Note: The estimated population of Pakistan according to the United States Census as of 1 July 2024, including the estimated population of the Pakistani diaspora.)

Regions with significant populations
- South Asia
- Pakistan: 241,499,431 (2023 Pakistan Census)
- Saudi Arabia: 1,814,678 (2022 census)
- United Arab Emirates: 1,700,000 (2017 estimate)
- United Kingdom: 1,662,286(2021); England: 1,570,285 – 2.8% (2021); Scotland: 72,871 – 1.3% (2022); Wales: 17,534 – 0.6% (2021); Northern Ireland: 1,596 – 0.08% (2021)
- United States: 684,438 (2023 American Community Survey estimate)
- Canada: 303,260 (2021 official Canadian census)
- Oman: 235,000 (2013 estimate)
- Kuwait: 150,000 (2009 estimate)
- Germany: 140,000 (2022)
- Italy: 130,593 (2017 official estimate)
- Qatar: 125,000 (2016 official Qatari estimate)
- Bahrain: 112,000 (2013 estimate)
- Spain: 100,000 (2017 estimate)
- Iraq: 50,000–100,000 (2024 estimate)
- Australia: 89,633 (2021) (2016 official Australian census)
- Malaysia: 59,281 (2017 official Malaysian estimate)
- China: 54,000
- Norway: 46,000 (2025)
- Denmark: 28,703 (2025)
- France: 26,600 (2017)
- Japan: 23,000 (2023)
- Hong Kong: 24,385 (2021)
- Ireland: 15,185 (2022 estimate)
- Turkey: 14,384 (2024)

Languages
- Pakistani languages, including: Balochi; Balti; Brahui; Burushaski; English (Note: Mostly as a second-language); Hazaragi; Hindko; Kashmiri; Khowar; Kohistani; Pashto; Punjabi; Saraiki; Shina; Sindhi; Urdu; Wakhi

Religion
- Majority: Islam (96.5%) (85–90% Sunni, 10–15% Shia); Minority: Hinduism, Christianity, Ahmadiyya, Kalasha, Sikhism, Zoroastrianism

Pakistanis (Urdu: پاكِستانى قوم, romanized: Pākistānī Qaum, lit. 'Pakistani Nation') are the citizens and nationals of the Islamic Republic of Pakistan. Pakistan is the fifth-most populous country, with a population of over 241.5 million, having the second-largest Muslim population as of 2023. A majority of around 97% of Pakistanis are Muslims. As much as 85-90% of the population follows Sunni Islam. The majority of Pakistanis natively speak languages belonging to the Indo-Iranic family (Indo-Aryan and Iranic subfamilies).

Located in South Asia, the country is also the source of a significantly large diaspora, most of whom reside in the Arab countries of the Persian Gulf, with an estimated population of 4.7 million. The second-largest Pakistani diaspora resides throughout both Northwestern Europe and Western Europe, where there are an estimated 2.4 million; over half of this figure resides in the United Kingdom (see British Pakistanis).

== Ethnic subgroups ==
Ethnically, Indo-Aryan peoples comprise the majority of the population in the eastern provinces of Pakistani Punjab, Sindh, and Kashmir, while Iranic peoples comprise the majority in the western provinces of Balochistan and Khyber Pakhtunkhwa. In addition to its four provinces, Pakistan also administers two disputed territories known as Azad Jammu and Kashmir and Gilgit–Baltistan; both territories also have an Indo-Aryan majority with the exception of the latter's subregion of Baltistan, which is largely inhabited by Tibetan peoples. Pakistan also hosts an insignificant population of Dravidian peoples, the majority of whom are South Indians who trace their roots to historical princely states such as Hyderabad Deccan and are identified with the multi-ethnic community of Muhajirs (lit. 'migrants'), who arrived in the country after the partition of British India in 1947.

Major ethnolinguistic groups in the country include Punjabis, Pashtuns, Sindhis, Saraikis, and Baloch people; with significant numbers of Kashmiris, Brahuis, Hindkowans, Paharis, Shina people, Burusho people, Wakhis, Baltis, Chitralis, and other minorities.

== Culture ==
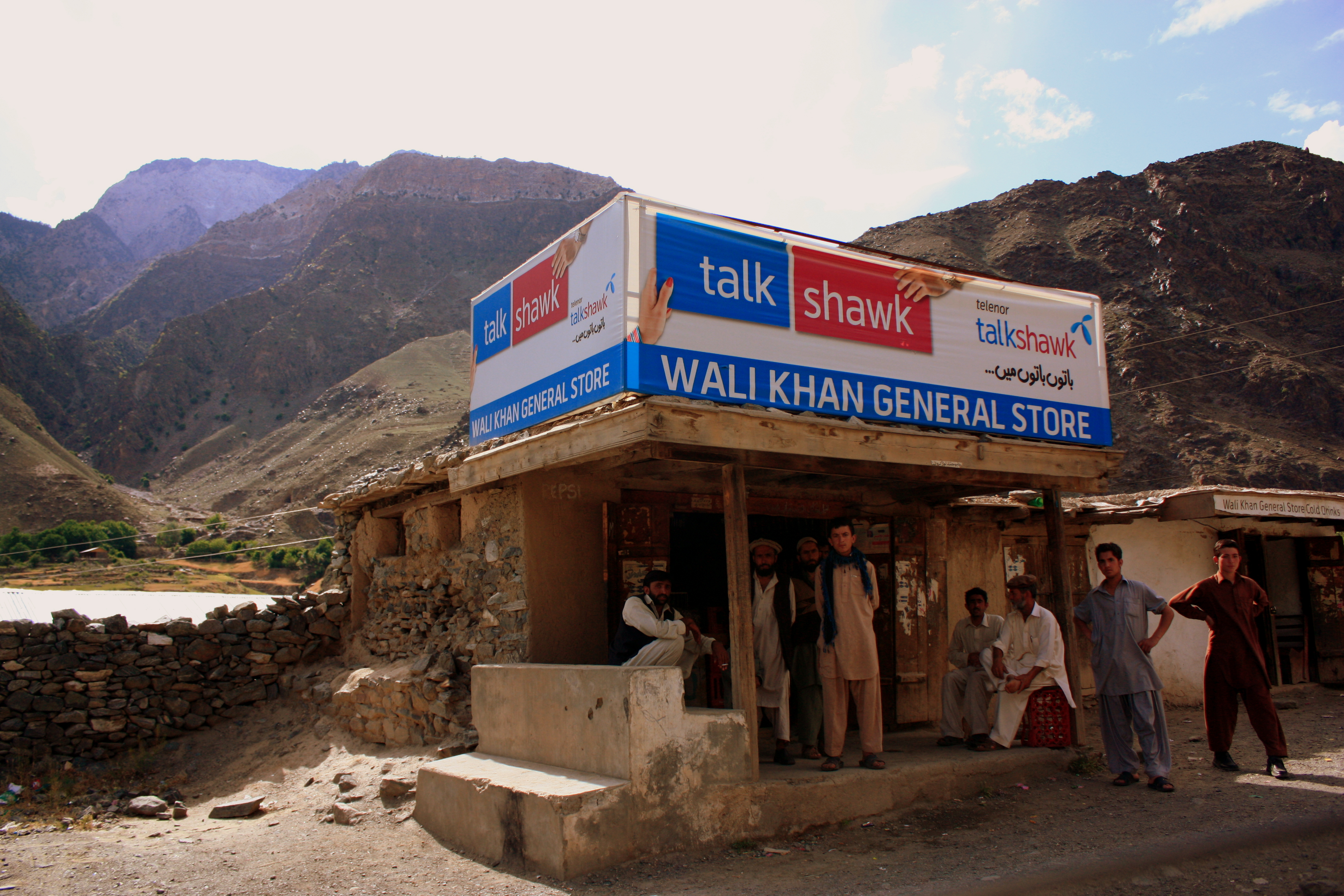
Men dressed in shalwar kameez in a general store on the road to Kalash, Pakistan

The existence of Pakistan as an Islamic state since the 1956 constitution has led to the large-scale injection of Islam into most aspects of Pakistani culture and everyday life, which has accordingly impacted the historical values and traditions of the Muslim-majority population. Marriages and other major events are significantly impacted by regional differences in culture but generally follow Islamic jurisprudence where required. The national dress of Pakistan is the shalwar kameez, a unisex garment widely-worn, and national dress, of Pakistan. When women wear the shalwar-kameez in some regions, they usually wear a long scarf or shawl called a dupatta around the head or neck. The dupatta is also employed as a form of modesty—although it is made of delicate material, it obscures the upper body's contours by passing over the shoulders. For Muslim women, the dupatta is a less stringent alternative to the chador or burqa.

== Languages ==
Urdu, or Lashkari (لشکری ), an Indo-Aryan language, is the lingua franca of Pakistan, and while it shares official status with English, it is the preferred and dominant language used for inter-communication between different ethnic groups. It is not believed to be a language affiliated with any ethnicity and its speakers come from various backgrounds. Although Indo-Aryan in classification, its exact origins as a language are disputed by scholars. However, despite serving as the country's lingua franca, most Pakistanis speak their ethnic languages and the lingua franca as second. Numerous regional and provincial languages are spoken as native languages by Pakistan's various ethnolinguistic groups, with the Punjabi language having a national plurality as the first language of approximately 45 per cent of the total population. Languages with more than a million speakers each include Pashto, Sindhi, Saraiki, Balochi, Brahui, and Hindko. The Pakistani dialect of English is also widely spoken throughout the country, albeit mostly in urban centres such as Islamabad, Lahore and Karachi.

== Religion ==
Pakistan officially endorses Islam as a state religion. The overwhelming majority of Pakistanis identify as Muslims, and the country has the second-largest population of Muslims in the world after Indonesia. Other minority religious faiths include Hinduism, Christianity, Ahmadiyya, Sikhism, Zoroastrianism, and Kalasha. Pakistan's Hindu and Christian minorities comprise the second- and third-largest religious groups in the country, respectively.

== Diaspora ==
Distribution of Pakistani diaspora Pakistan + 1,000,000 + 100,000 + 10,000 + 1,000

The Pakistani diaspora maintains a significant presence in the Middle East, Europe, North America, and Australia. According to the United Nations Department of Economic and Social Affairs, Pakistan has the seventh-largest diaspora in the world. According to the Ministry of Overseas Pakistanis and Human Resource Development of the Government of Pakistan, approximately 10+ million Pakistanis live abroad, with the vast majority (over 4.7 million) residing in the Arab states of the Persian Gulf.

== See also ==
- List of Pakistanis
- Islam in Pakistan
- Demographics of Pakistan
- Ethnic groups in Pakistan
- Overseas Pakistanis
