= El Ayoun =

El Ayoun may refer to:

- El Aaiún, the capital of Western Sahara
- El Ayoun (Tunisia), a city in Kasserine Governorate in Tunisia
- Hajeb El Ayoun
- Ayoun el Atrous, Mauritania
- Ayun, Chitral

== See also ==
- El Aioun (disambiguation)
