= Benayoun =

Benayoun, occasionally Benayon or Benaioun, is a surname largely of Moroccan descent. Notable people with the surname include:

- Amir Benayoun (born 1975), Israeli singer-songwriter
- Maurice Benayoun, French artist
- Michaël Benayoun (born 1973)
- Robert Benayoun, French film critic and author
- Yossi Benayoun (born 1980), Israeli football player
- Isaac Benayon Sabba, Brazilian businessman
- Salomon Benaioun, Moroccan printer and journalist

== See also ==
- Ayoun
- Ayun (disambiguation)
