= List of Intangible Cultural Heritage elements in Pakistan =

The United Nations Educational, Scientific and Cultural Organisation (UNESCO) intangible cultural heritage elements are the non-physical traditions and practices performed by a people. As part of a country's cultural heritage, they include celebrations, festivals, performances, oral traditions, music, and the making of handicrafts. The "intangible cultural heritage" is defined by the Convention for the Safeguarding of Intangible Cultural Heritage, drafted in 2003 and took effect in 2006. Inscription of new heritage elements on the UNESCO Intangible Cultural Heritage Lists is determined by the Intergovernmental Committee for the Safeguarding of Intangible Cultural Heritage, an organisation established by the convention.

Pakistan ratified the convention on 7 October 2005.

== Intangible Cultural Heritage of Humanity ==
+ Transnational element

=== Representative List ===
Name	Image	Year	No.	Description
Nawrouz, Novruz, Nowrouz, Nowrouz, Nawrouz, Nauryz, Nooruz, Nowruz, Navruz, Nevruz, Nowruz, Navruz + (Note: Shared with Afghanistan, Azerbaijan, India, Iran, Iraq, Kazakhstan, Kyrgyzstan, Uzbekistan, Tajikistan, Turkmenistan, Mongolia, and Turkey.)		2016	02097	New Year is often a time when people wish for prosperity and new beginnings. March 21 marks the start of the year when a variety of rituals, ceremonies and other cultural events take place for a period of about two weeks.
Falconry, a living human heritage + (Note: Shared with Austria, Belgium, Croatia, Czechia, France, Germany, Hungary, Ireland, Italy, Kazakhstan, Republic of Korea, Kyrgyzstan, Mongolia, Morocco, Netherlands, Poland, Portugal, Qatar, Saudi Arabia, Slovakia, Spain, Syria, and the United Arab Emirates.)		2021	01708	

=== Need of Urgent Safeguarding List ===
Name	Year	No.	Description
Suri Jagek (observing the sun), traditional meteorological and astronomical practice based on the observation of the sun, moon and stars in reference to the local topography	2018	01381	Suri Jagek (literally, observation of the Sun) is the body of traditional and empirical knowledge in meteorology and astronomy of the Kalash people. Agriculture, prevention of natural damage and the constitution of the calendar arise from this system.
Boreendo, Bhorindo: ancient dying folk musical instrument, its melodies, knowledge, and skills	2025	2328	The boreendo, or bhorindo, is a traditional musical instrument of the Thari community.

== See also ==
- List of World Heritage Sites in Pakistan
