= Chilam Joshi Festival =

Festival in Kalasha Valleys, Pakistan

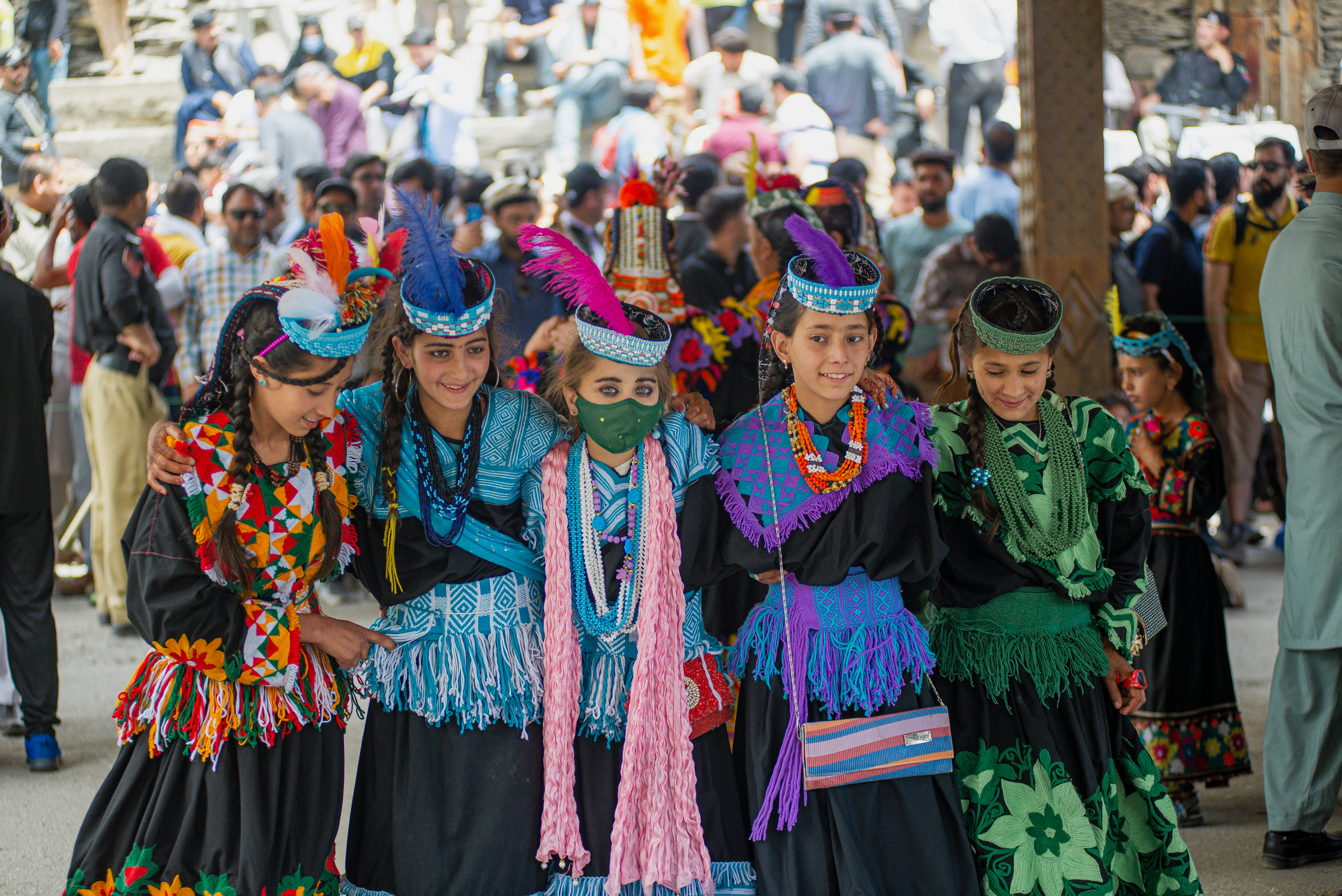
Kalasha girls during the festival celebrations in May 2022

Chilam Joshi Festival also spelt Chilim Joshi, is a festival celebrated by the Kalash people, living in the Kalasha Valleys in Khyber Pakhtunkhwa province of Pakistan. It marks the commencement of spring within the Kalasha community and is celebrated from the 13th to the 16th of May each year.

== Activities ==
The three to four-day festival is held in the middle of May. It serves both spiritual and social purposes. The Kalasha people pray for their livestock's wellbeing, invoking their deity, Goshidai. The festival also facilitates the search for potential marital partners, with announcements made at its conclusion by those successful in this quest. Essential activities of the festival are song and dance, with women traditionally wearing new clothes, and community-wide dances welcoming the spring season.

While the festival spans the three Kalasha Valleys, Bumburet Valley sees the most visitors due to its greater accessibility. Over time, the festival has evolved in sync with shifts in Kalasha culture, as suggested by anthropological studies. It has become a platform for the community to exhibit their culture to a wider audience, contributing to their economy by attracting tourists.
