= Aioun =

El Aioun may refer to:

- Laayoune, Western Sahara (administered and claimed by Morocco)
- El Aioun, Mauritania
- El Aioun Sidi Mellouk (Morocco)
- El Aioun, Algeria, a commune in El Taref Province, Algeria

== See also ==
- Ayun (disambiguation)
- El Ayoun (disambiguation)
