= El Aioun =

El Aioun may refer to:

- El Aioun, Taref, commune in El Taref Province, Algeria
- Laayoune, city of the disputed territory of Western Sahara
- El Aioun, Mauritania, town in Mauritania
- El Aioun Sidi Mellouk, city in Taourirt Province, Oriental, Morocco

== See also ==
- Aioun (disambiguation)
- El Ayoun (disambiguation)
