= Hajeb El Ayoun =

Town in Kairouan Governorate, Tunisia

Hajeb El Ayoun حاجب العيون Masclianae
- Commune and town
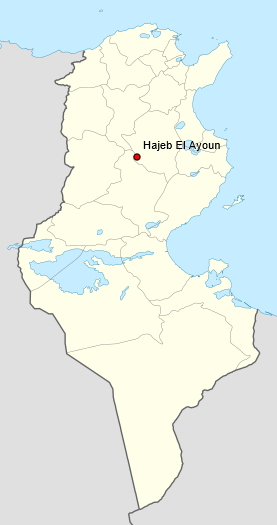
- map showing the location of Hadjeh-El-Aïoun a town in Tunisia
- Interactive map of Hajeb El Ayoun
- Country: Tunisia
- Governorate: Kairouan Governorate

Government
  - Mayor: Lazhar Nasri
- Elevation: 490 ft (150 m)

Population (2014)
  - Total: 10,631
- Time zone: UTC+1 (CET)
- Postal code: 3160
- Website: http://www.commune-hadjebelayoun.gov.tn

Hajeb El Ayoun (Arabic: حاجب العيون) is a town and commune in the Kairouan Governorate, Tunisia. As of 2004 it had a population of 9,648. It is also the capital of a district of 35,403 inhabitants.

The Mayor is Hassen Zaïdi, and the post code is 3160.

== Geography ==
It is located at 35° 23′N, 9° 32′E and across fields from the west shores of Sidi Saad lake having the largest dam in Tunisia, which enables agricultural irrigation in the surrounding fields. The economy includes olive and apricot production. The town is 49m above sea level.

== History ==
Ruins near the town have tentatively been identified with the remains of a Roman era town of Masclianae. The town is also the seat in name at least of an ancient Christian titular Bishopric In the 1830s the site was excavated by Lieutenant Harinezo, who discovered the remains of a Christian era, basilica, with various inscriptions in situ. The ruins have been suggested as the remains of the Roman civitas of Germaniciana.

The United States Army engaged Rommels Afrika Korps here on 19 February 1943.

== Notable people ==
- Ali Chourabi, magistrate and independent presidential candidate at the 2014 elections.
- Béchir M'hedhbi, a politician during the independence period, director of the Tunisian national radio and a personality in charge of various government position, ministries and ambassador.
- Moncef (el) Ouahibi poet, writer and academic

== Population ==
2014 Census (Municipal)
Homes	Families	Males	Females	Total
2689	2300	5209	5412	10621

== See also ==
- List of cities in Tunisia
- El Ayoun
- Ayoun el Atrous, Mauritania
