= Bumburet =

Valley in Khyber Pakhtunkhwa, Pakistan

Bumburet وادی بمبوریت
- valley
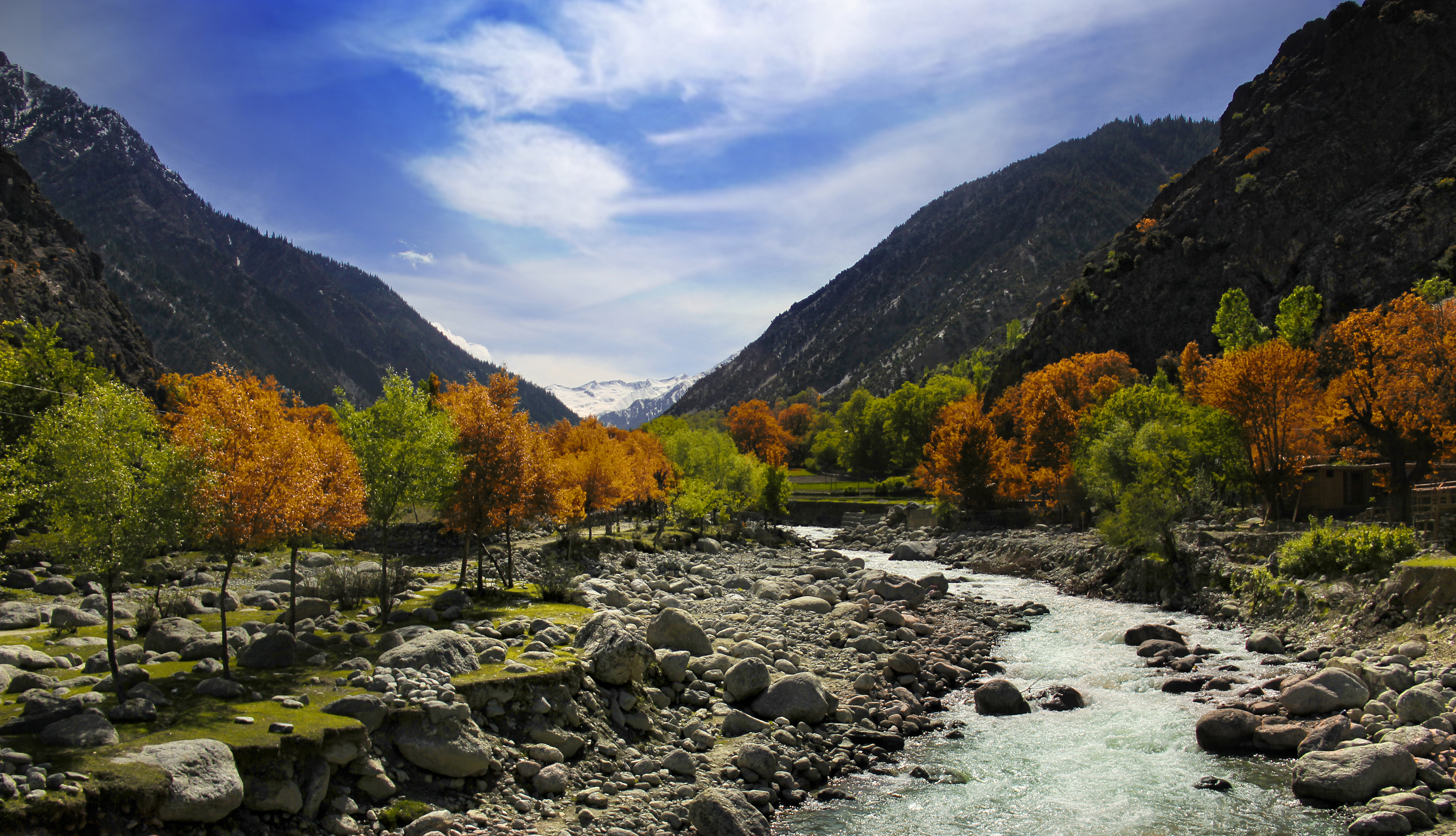

- Location within Khyber Pakhtunkhwa Location within Pakistan
- Coordinates: 35°42′2″N 71°41′30″E
- Country: Pakistan
- Province: Khyber Pakhtunkhwa
- District: Lower Chitral District
- Elevation: 2,288 m (7,507 ft)
- Time zone: UTC+5 (PST)

Bumburet (Kalasha: Mumuret, Urdu: وادی بمبوریت, also spelt Bumboret or Bumburait) is the largest valley of Kalasha Desh in Lower Chitral District of Khyber Pakhtunkhwa province of Pakistan. It is one of the three valleys of Kalasha Valleys and a tourist destination in the northern Pakistan.

The Bumburet Valley joins the Rumbur Valley from the south (at 35°44′20″N 71°43′40″E, 1,600 metres (5,200 ft)), and then joins the Kunar Valley at the village of Ayun (at 35°42′52″N 71°46′40″E, 2288 meters), some 20 kilometres (12 mi) south (downstream) of Chitral. To the west the valley rises to a pass connecting to Afghanistan's Nuristan Province at about 4,500 metres (14,800 ft). Lying in the Hindu Kush mountain range, the area features streams, meadows and agricultural fields with walnut and apricot trees. The valley is inhabited primarily by the Kalash people, and has become a tourist destination. There is an archaeology museum, Kalasha Dur Museum, in the valley.

Much of the infrastructure of the region was destroyed by the floods during July – August 2015 triggered by heavy rainfalls and glacial outburst. The ruined areas were visited by the British royals, Prince William and Princess Catherine of Wales on their tour of Pakistan in October 2019.

== See also ==
- Chilam Joshi, a festival celebrated in the region

== Sources ==
- Kochetov, Alexei; Arsenault, Paul; Petersen, Jan Heegård; Kalas, Sikandar; Kalash, Taj Khan (December 2021). "Kalasha (Bumburet variety)". Journal of the International Phonetic Association. 51 (3): 468–489. doi:10.1017/S0025100319000367.
- Naeem, H., Rana, A., R., & Sarfarz, N. (June 2011). Attitude Measurement and Testing: An Empirical Study of Kalash People in Pakistan. Interdisciplinary Journal of Contemporary Research in Business, vol. 3, No 2.
