= Kalasha Valleys =

Kalash وادیِ کیلاش
- Valley
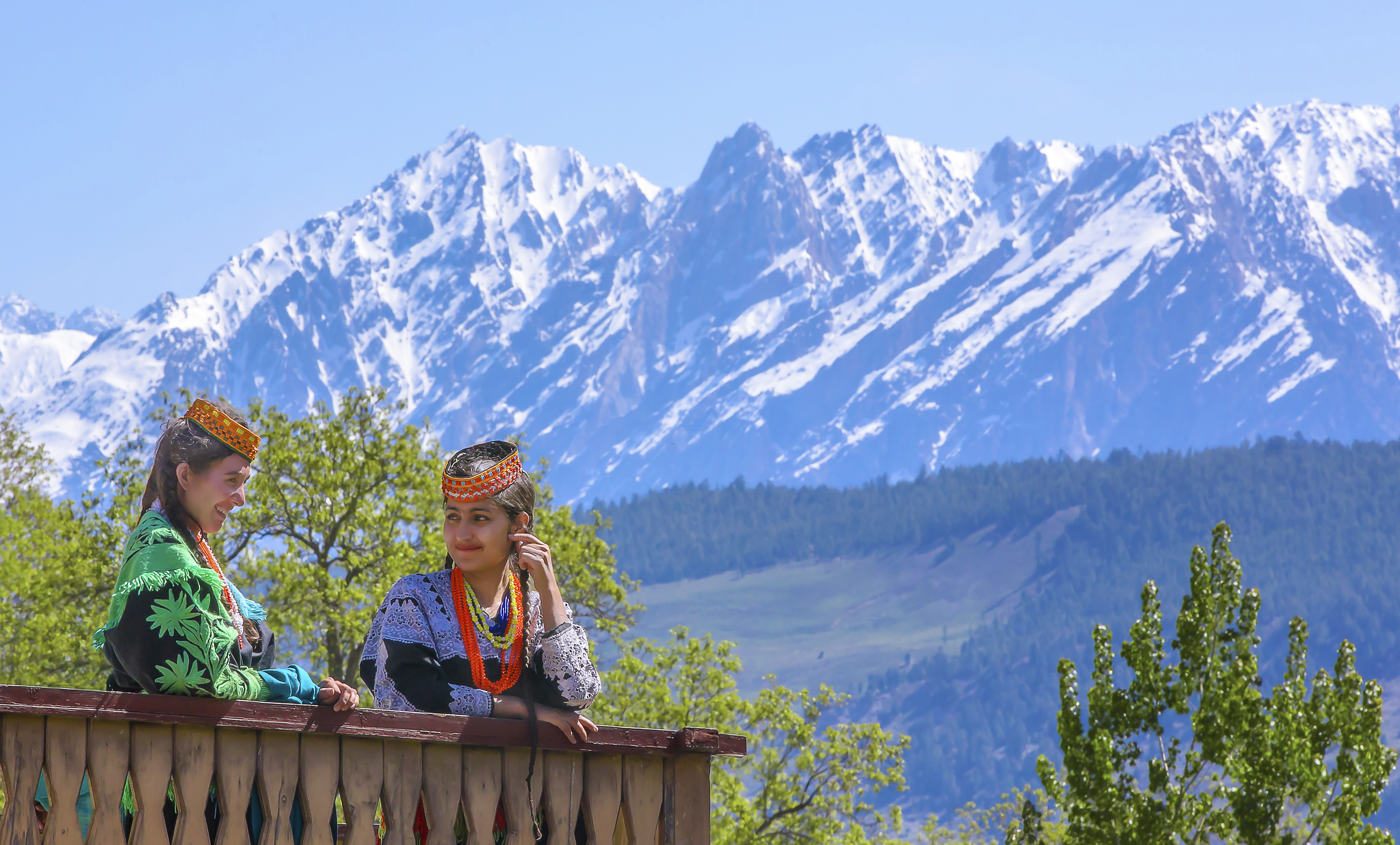
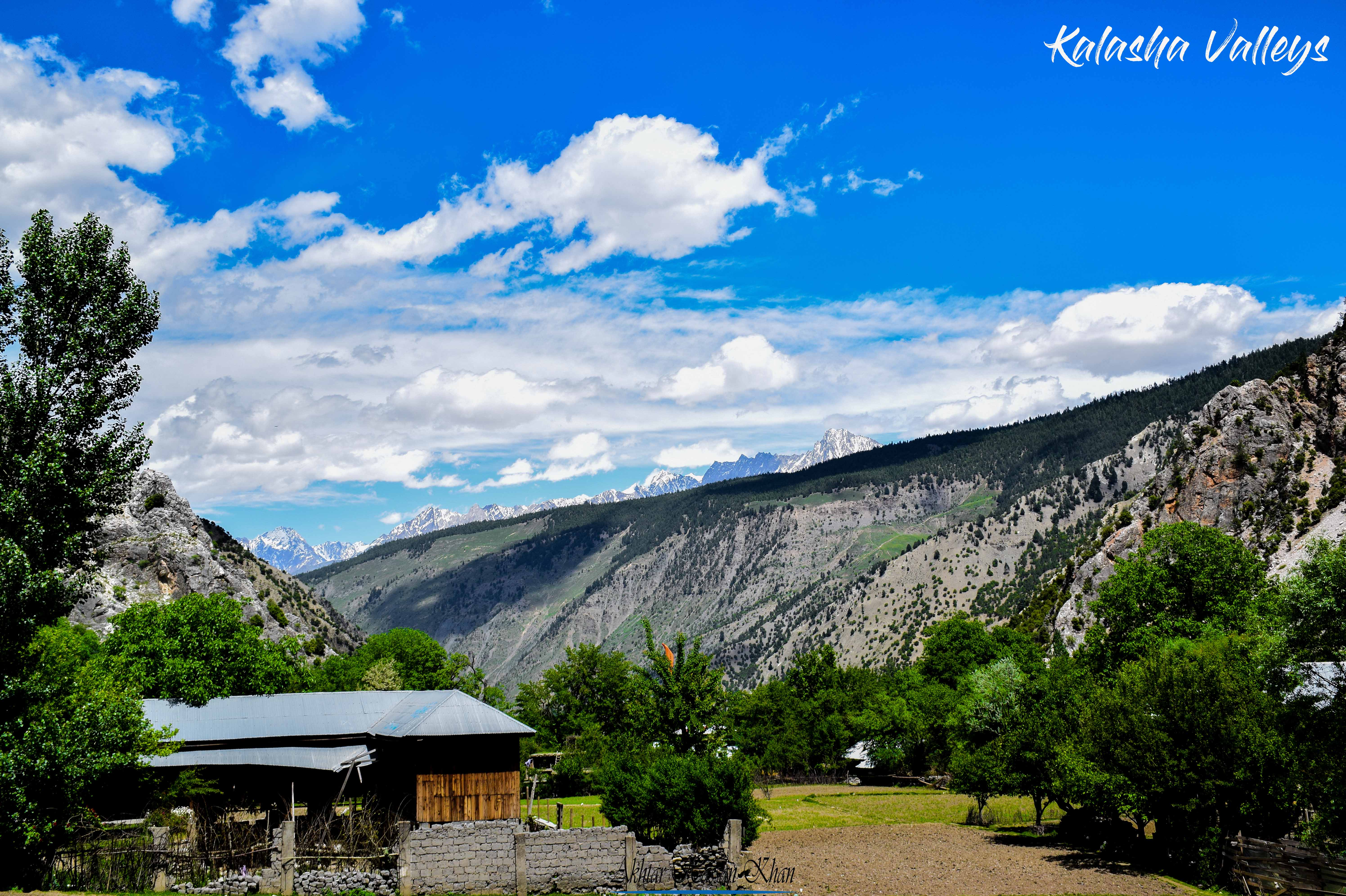
- The three remote valleys are home to the animist Kalash people

- Kalash Valley
- Coordinates: 35°42′2″N 71°41′29″E
- Country: Pakistan
- Province: Khyber Pakhtunkhwa
- District: Chitral District
- Elevation: 1,800 m (5,900 ft)

Population (2026)
  - Total: 9,000
- Time zone: UTC+5 (PST)

The Kalasha valleys (Kalasha-mondr: Kaĺaśa Desh; Urdu: وادی کیلاش) are three valleys in Chitral District of northern Pakistan. The valleys are surrounded by the Hindu Kush mountain range. There are three main valleys. All three Kalasha valleys are mainly inhabited by Kalasha people, with smaller Kho and Gujar communities.

The Kalash people have a unique culture and language, and follow a form of religion that is associated with their surroundings, like the mountains and rivers. The largest and most populous valley is Bumburet (Mumuret), reached by a road from Ayun in the main Chitral Valley. Rumbur (Rukmu) is a side valley north of Bumburet. The third valley, Biriu (Birir), is a side valley of the Chitral Valley south of Bumburet.

The Kalasha valleys

== Gallery ==
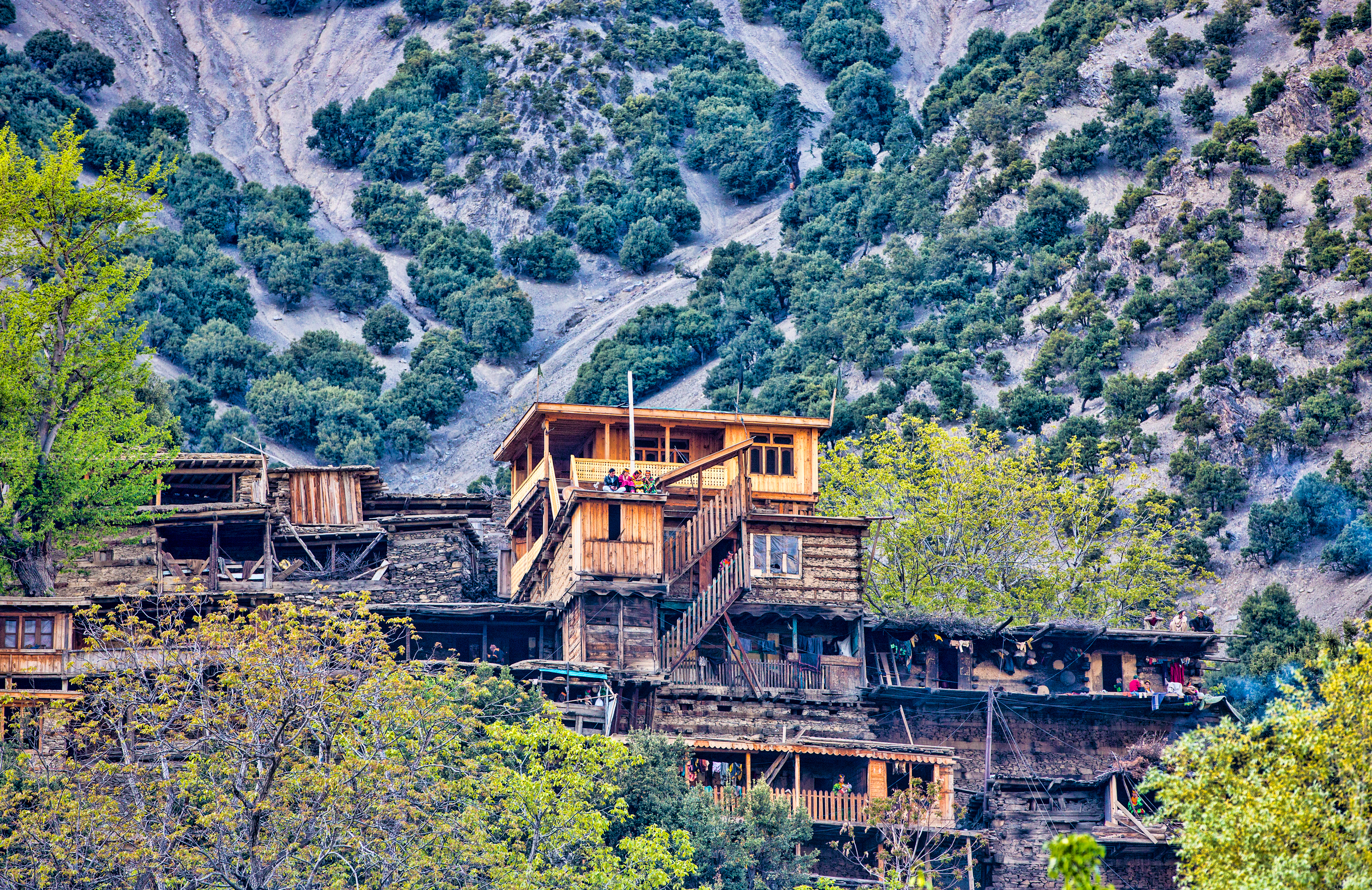
Typical homes in the Kalasha Valleys

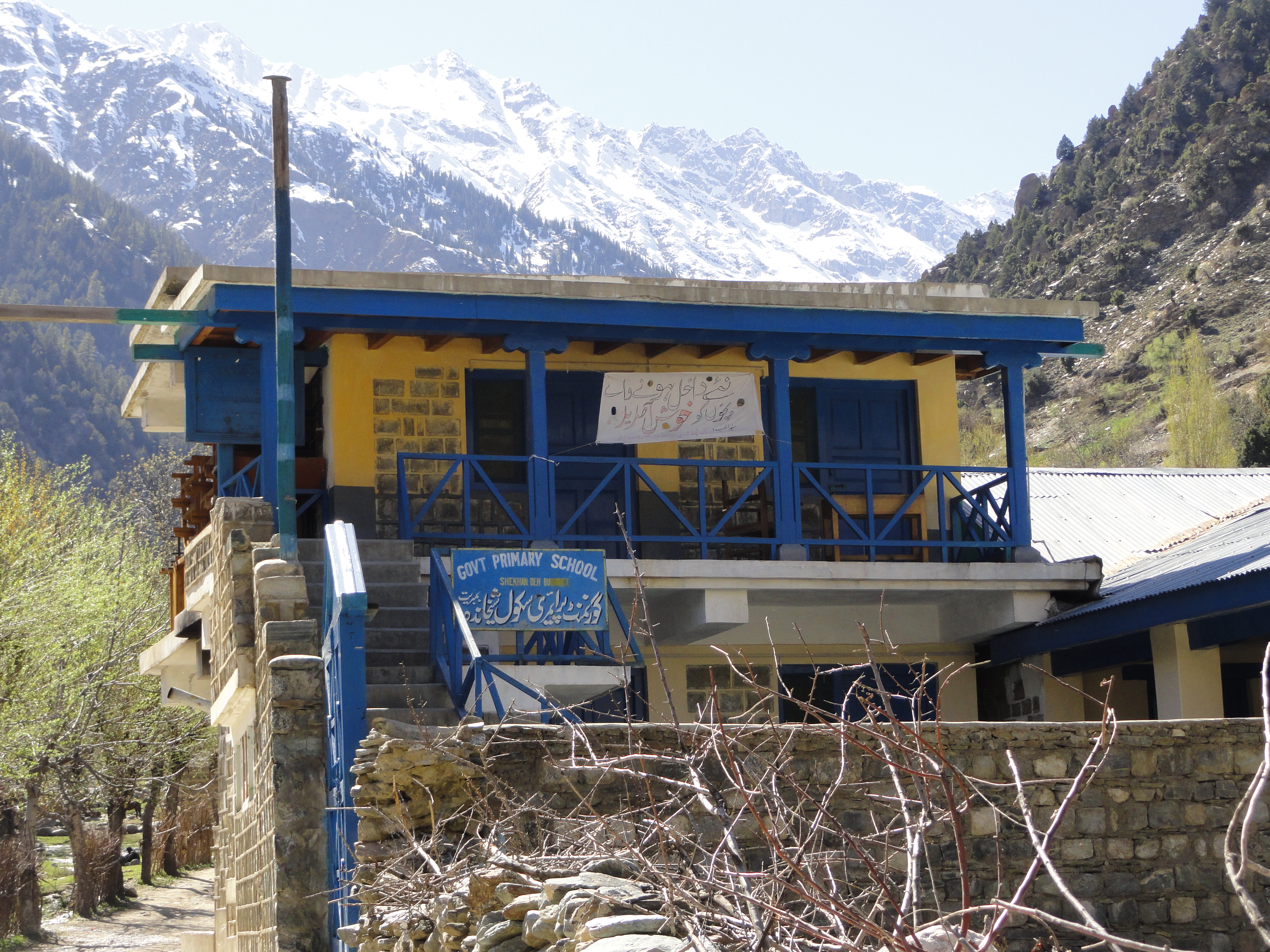
A school in the Kalasha Valleys

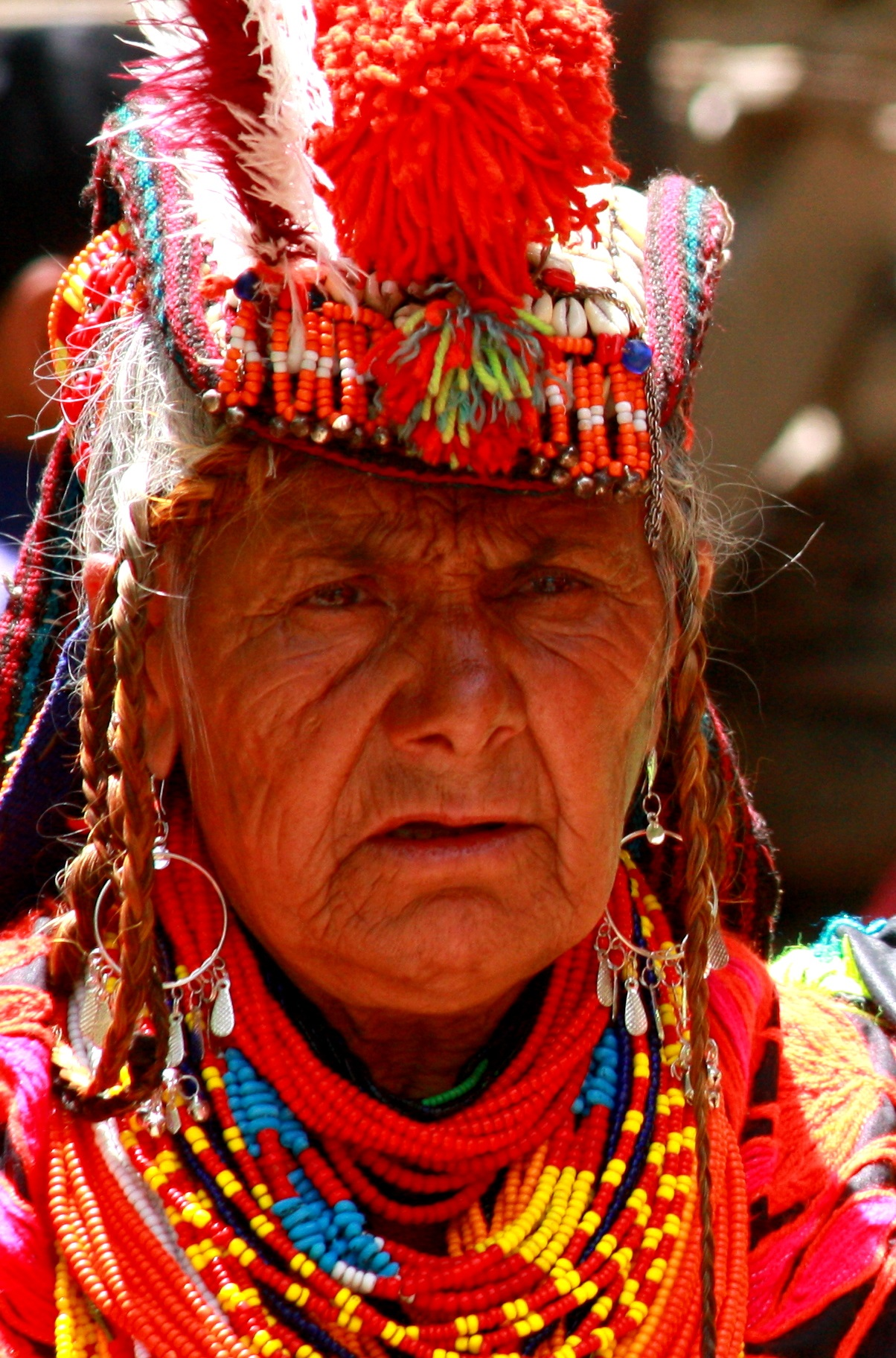
A Kalasha woman

== See also ==
- Kaghan Valley
- Neelam Valley
- Naltar Valley
- Hunza Valley
