= Ayun (woreda) =

- District
- Country: Ethiopia

Ayun is a district of Somali Region in Ethiopia.

== See also ==
- Districts of Ethiopia
