= El Ayoun (Tunisia) =

- Location in Tunisia
- Coordinates: 35.5435°N 8.8873°E
- Country: Tunisia
- Governorate: Kasserine Governorate

Population (2004)
  - Total: 18,634
- Time zone: UTC1 (CET)
- Postal code: 1216

El Ayoun (Arabic: العيون ) is a town in Kasserine Governorate, Tunisia, population 18634 (2004 census).

== See also ==
- Hajeb El Ayoun
