= Ayun, Chitral =

Ayun ایون
- valley
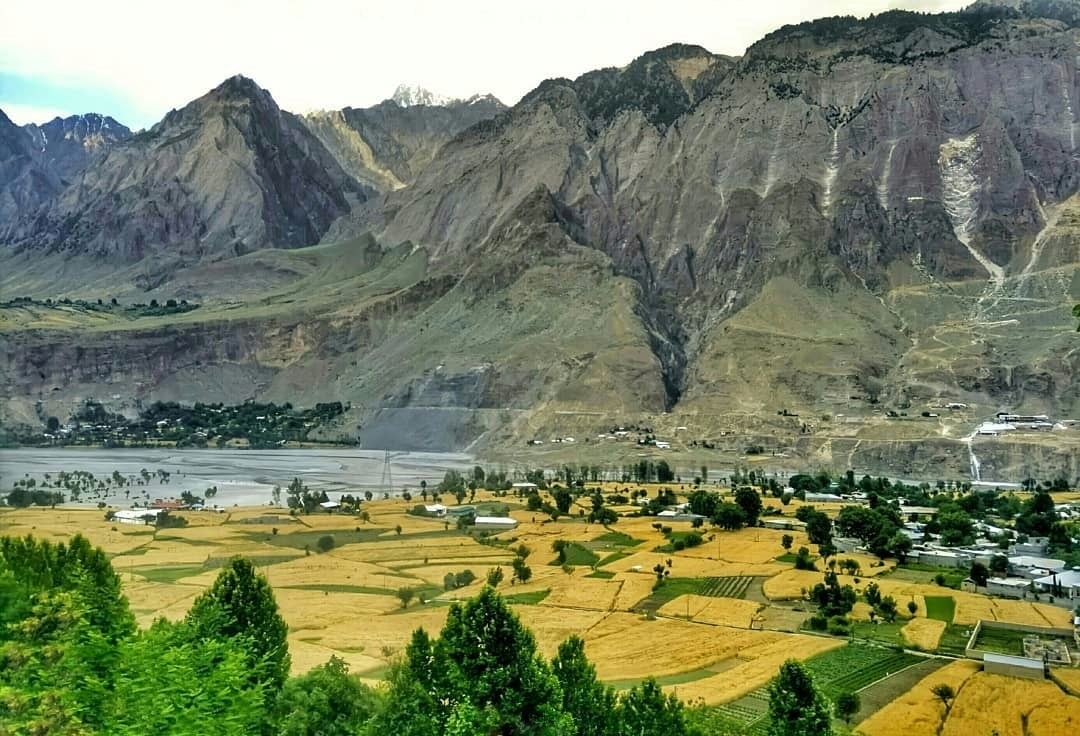
- Nickname: Heart of Chitral
- Location within Khyber Pakhtunkhwa Location within Pakistan
- Coordinates: 35°43′21″N 71°46′01″E
- Country: Pakistan
- Province: Khyber Pakhtunkhwa
- District: Lower Chitral District

Area
  - Total: 15 km^{2} (5.8 sq mi)
- Elevation: 1,400 m (4,600 ft)

Population (2018)
  - Total: 28,182
- Demonym: Chitralis or Ayunis

Languages
  - Official: Urdu
  - Native: Chitrali
- Time zone: UTC+5 (PST)
- Zip Code: 17210
- Area code: 0943

Ayun (Khowar: Oyon, Urdu: ایون) is a valley in Lower Chitral, Khyber Pakhtunkhwa, Pakistan, 23 km south of the town of Chitral. It is located on the Chitral River at its confluence with the Bumburet River. Mountains surround the valley. The Bumburet River runs the length of the village and its water is used for irrigation, drinking, and the generation of electricity for the Ayun valley.

== Geographics ==
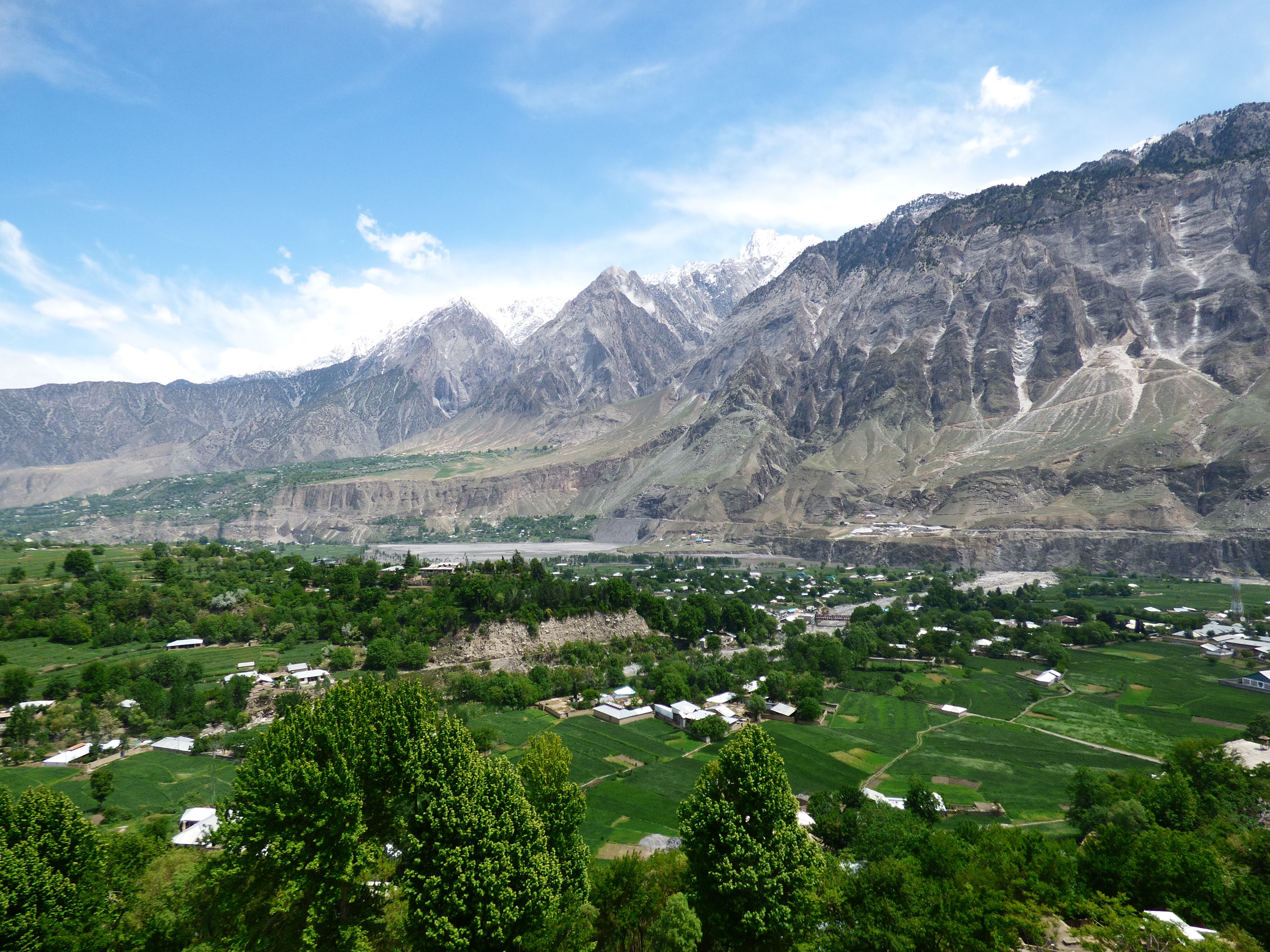
Ayun

Ayun has an average elevation of 4,500 ft (1,400 m).

The valley shares its borders with Bumburet and Birir to the west, Broze to the east, Chitral to the north, and Gahirat to the south.

== Climate ==
Ayun has a warm-summer humid continental climate (Dfb) according to the Köppen climate classification. The average annual temperature in Ayun is 26°C. Each year, there is an approximate 1209 mm | 47.6 inch of precipitation that occurs.

Climate data for Ayun
Month	Jan	Feb	Mar	Apr	May	Jun	Jul	Aug	Sep	Oct	Nov	Dec	Year
Mean daily maximum °C (°F)	−4.6 (23.7)	−2.6 (27.3)	2.4 (36.3)	7.6 (45.7)	15.1 (59.2)	23 (73)	26.2 (79.2)	25.1 (77.2)	21.8 (71.2)	14.2 (57.6)	3.2 (37.8)	−3.2 (26.2)	26.2 (79.2)
Daily mean °C (°F)	−7.9 (17.8)	−5.8 (21.6)	−1.5 (29.3)	3.7 (38.7)	10.4 (50.7)	18 (64)	21.3 (70.3)	20 (68)	16.6 (61.9)	8.7 (47.7)	−1.4 (29.5)	6.5 (43.7)	21.3 (70.3)
Mean daily minimum °C (°F)	−11.3 (11.7)	−9.1 (15.6)	−5.4 (22.3)	−0.7 (30.7)	4.5 (40.1)	11.5 (52.7)	15.7 (60.3)	14.9 (58.8)	11.1 (52.0)	2.6 (36.7)	−6 (21)	−10.3 (13.5)	15.7 (60.3)
Average precipitation mm (inches)	108 (4.3)	153 (6.0)	195 (7.7)	160 (6.3)	104 (4.1)	61 (2.4)	54 (2.1)	56 (2.2)	40 (1.6)	50 (2.0)	53 (2.1)	51 (2.0)	1,085 (42.8)
Source: Climate-Data.org

== Demographics ==
Chitrali is the main language spoken in Ayun. Bashgali is also spoken by a small population.

== Educational institutions ==
- Hira Public School Ayun
- Government Higher Secondary School Ayun
- Government Higher Secondary School for Women Ayun

== Notable Tribes of Ayun ==
- Zundre or Rono
- Katur
- Rizakhail
- Sangale
- Khaniye

== Notable people ==
Mehtarjao Sirbuland Khan, the ancestor of the Khaniye tribe of Ayun and Drosh.

Mohayat Lal, the great grandson of Mehtarjao Sirbuland Khan. He remained Hakim of Ayun before partition.

- Kamran Khan (last Hakim of Ayun)
