= Rumbur =

Rumbur رمبور
- Valley
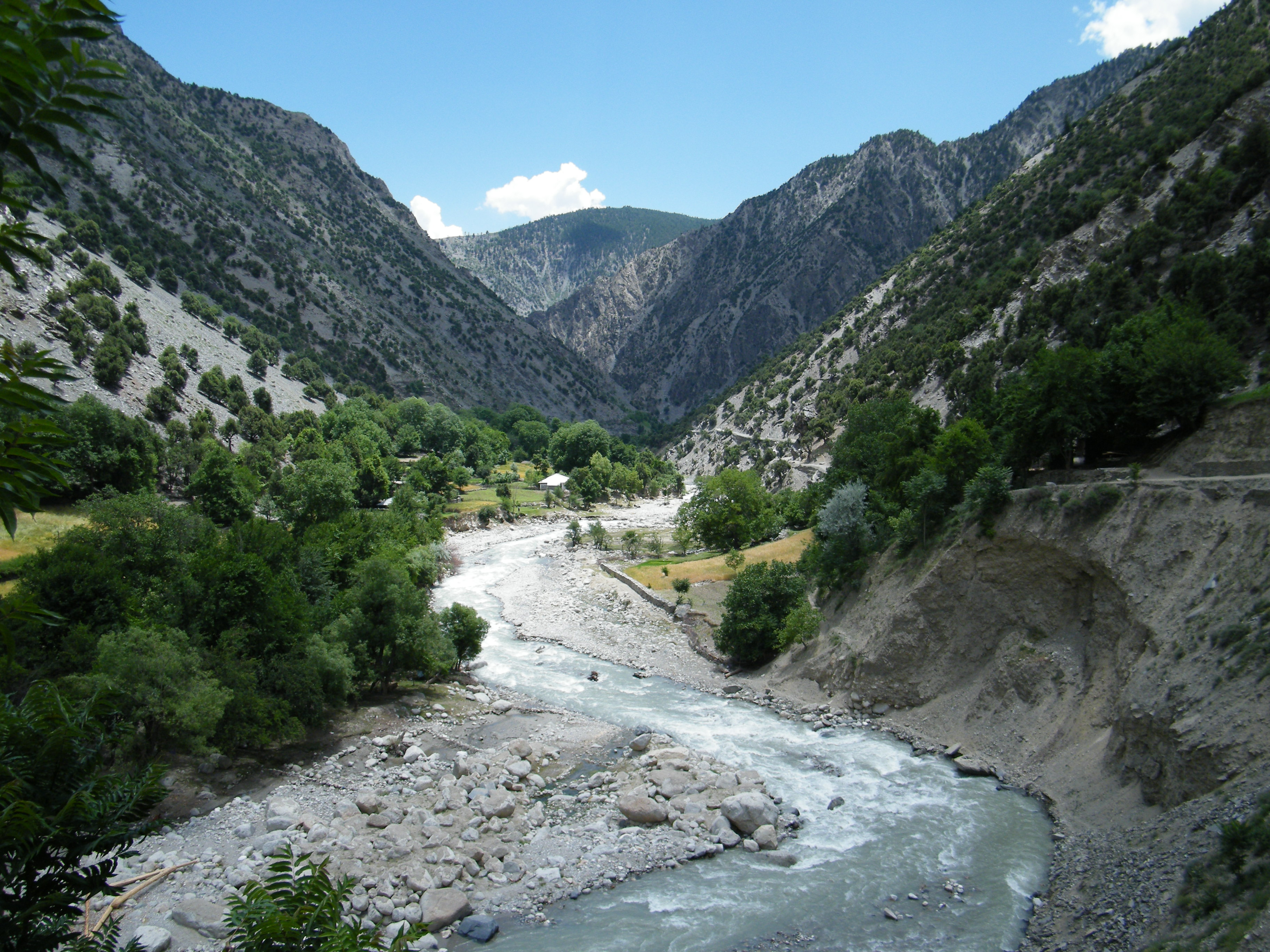

- Location within Khyber Pakhtunkhwa Location within Pakistan
- Coordinates: 35°46′2″N 71°41′56″E
- Country: Pakistan
- State: Khyber Pakhtunkhwa
- District: Lower Chitral District
- Time zone: UTC+5 (PST)

Rumbur (Kalasha: Rukmu) is one of the three Kalasha valleys situated in Lower Chitral District, Khyber Pakhtunkhwa, Pakistan. In 1995 in the valley there were approximately four families of Gujjars, eight families of Chitralis and other being of Kalash people.
