= Kalash people =

Ethnic group in Pakistan

Kalash
- Kalash girls photographed in 2022 at Chilam Joshi Festival

Total population
- 7,466 (2023 Census, includes only those who speak Kalasha as their mother tongue)

Regions with significant populations
- Kalasha Valleys (Chitral District, Khyber Pakhtunkhwa, Pakistan)

Languages
- L1: Kalasha; L2: Urdu (national language) and Khowar (for communication with other people)

Religion
- Majority Islam (Note: Zaheer-ud-Din (2015): "With the strengthen of Muslim rule in Chitral in 14th century C. E. most of the Kalash embraced Islam gradually, except a small number of them who up-hold their religion and customs [...] increasing Muslim population that converted the majority of the Kalash to a minority even in these valleys as well."); Minority Animism and ancestor worship (Note: Animism and ancestor worship: Witzel (2004, p. 2): "There is the prominent role of shamans (pshur, wrear, deal N., dehar K., LIEVRE & LOUDE 1990) and related items: the use of flat circular drums, of various types of psychopharmaca (wine, fly agaric, rhubarb, mead, Pashto hum ~ Kalash sámani; cf. also NYBERG 1995), and a general pattern of goat sacrifice (already seen at Mehrgarh, near Quetta, 6500 BCE), with sprinkling of the blood of the victim. There also is a general pattern of belief in mountain fairies, now often called by their Persian name, Peri, but still called Apsaras in the Rājatara ṅgi ṇī (3.465, 468-471 for King Ra ṇāditya's entering and disappearig in a mountain cave into the company of Daitya women)."; Searle (2013, p. lxxvii): "Kafiristan, the 'Land of the unbelievers', is a tiny enclave of pagans, who practice animism and ancestor worship, and remain unconverted to Islam."; Pelton (1997): "The Kalash (which means 'black' because of the black garments they wear) are an animist tribe who live in a region sometimes called Kafiristan."; Ruhland (2019, p. 107): "Their traditional shamanic religion is probably rooted in Indo-Iranian, pre-Zoroastrian Vedic traditions.") with elements of ancient Indo-Iranian (Vedic- or Hindu-like) religion (Note: Elements of ancient Indo-Iranian religion: Witzel (2004, p. 2): "an ancient, common substrate (TUITE 2000, cf. BENGTSON 1999, 2001, 2002). These must be separated from what may appear to be Vedic."; "A few key features that highlight the position of Hindukush religion in between the IIr. [Indo-Iranian], BMAC and Vedic religions will be summarized and discussed in some detail, as they by and large even now remain unknown to Vedic specialists, in spite of BUDDRUSS 1960 and the selective summary "d'un domaine mal connu des indianistes" by FUSSMAN (1977: 21-35), who, even with an "esprit hypercritique comme le nôtre" (1977: 27), overstresses (post-Vedic) Indian influences (1977: 69; for a balanced evaluation of the linguistic features, see now DEGENER 2002). However, both Hindukush and Vedic mythology, ritual, and festivals, in spite of many layers of developments and mutual influences, tend to explain each other very effectively; cf. the similar case of Nepal (Witzel 1997c: 520-32)."; Ruhland (2019, p. 107): "Their traditional shamanic religion is probably rooted in Indo-Iranian, pre-Zoroastrian Vedic traditions."; Vinogradov & Zharnikova (2020, p. 182): "... the pagan Kafir pantheon, which has preserved the relics of the most ancient Indo-Iranian mythological concepts."; Richard Strand, Peoples and Languages of Nuristan: "Before their conversion to Islâm the Nuristânis practised a form of ancient Hinduism, infused with accretions developed locally. They acknowledged a number of human-like deities who lived in the unseen Deity World (Kâmviri d'e lu; cf. Sanskrit deva lok'a-)"; West (2010, p. 357): "The Kalasha are a unique people living in just three valleys near Chitral, Pakistan, the capital of North-West Frontier Province, which borders Afghanistan. Unlike their neighbours in the Hindu Kush Mountains on both the Afghani and Pakistani sides of the border the Kalasha have not converted to Islam. During the mid-20th century a few Kalasha villages in Pakistan were forcibly converted to this dominant religion, but the people fought the conversion and, once official pressure was removed, the vast majority continued to practice their own religion. Their religion is a form of Hinduism that recognises many gods and spirits and has been related to the religion of the Ancient Greeks, who mythology says are the ancestors of the contemporary Kalash [...] However, it is much more likely, given their Indo-Aryan language, that the religion of the Kalasha is much more closely aligned to the Hinduism of their Indian neighbours than to the religion of Alexander the Great and his armies.)

Related ethnic groups
- Nuristanis, other Indo-Aryan peoples

The Kalash (Kalasha: کالؕاشؕا, romanized: Kaḷaṣa), or Kalasha, are a minority Indo-Aryan (Note: West (2010, p. 357): "The Kalasha are a unique people living in just three valleys near Chitral, Pakistan, the capital of North-West Frontier Province, which borders Afghanistan [...] However, it is much more likely, given their Indo-Aryan language, that the religion of the Kalasha is much more closely aligned to the Hinduism of their Indian neighbours that to the religion of Alexander the Great and his armies.") indigenous ethnic group native to the Chitral region in the Khyber-Pakhtunkhwa province of Pakistan. They form the smallest ethnoreligious group in Pakistan, practising what scholars consider a form of animism and ancestor worship with elements of Indo-Iranian (Vedic- or Hindu-like) religion, and as such are considered unique among the peoples of Pakistan.

Most of the Kalash gradually converted to Islam after the advent of the Muslim rule in Chitral in the 14th century, except for a small number who continued to uphold their religion and customs and were gradually restricted to the Kalasha Valleys of Bumburet, Rumbur and Birir. In the past the Kalasha people inhabited several other valleys as well, including Jinjeret Kuh, Urtsun, Suwir, Kalkatak and Damel.

== Geography ==
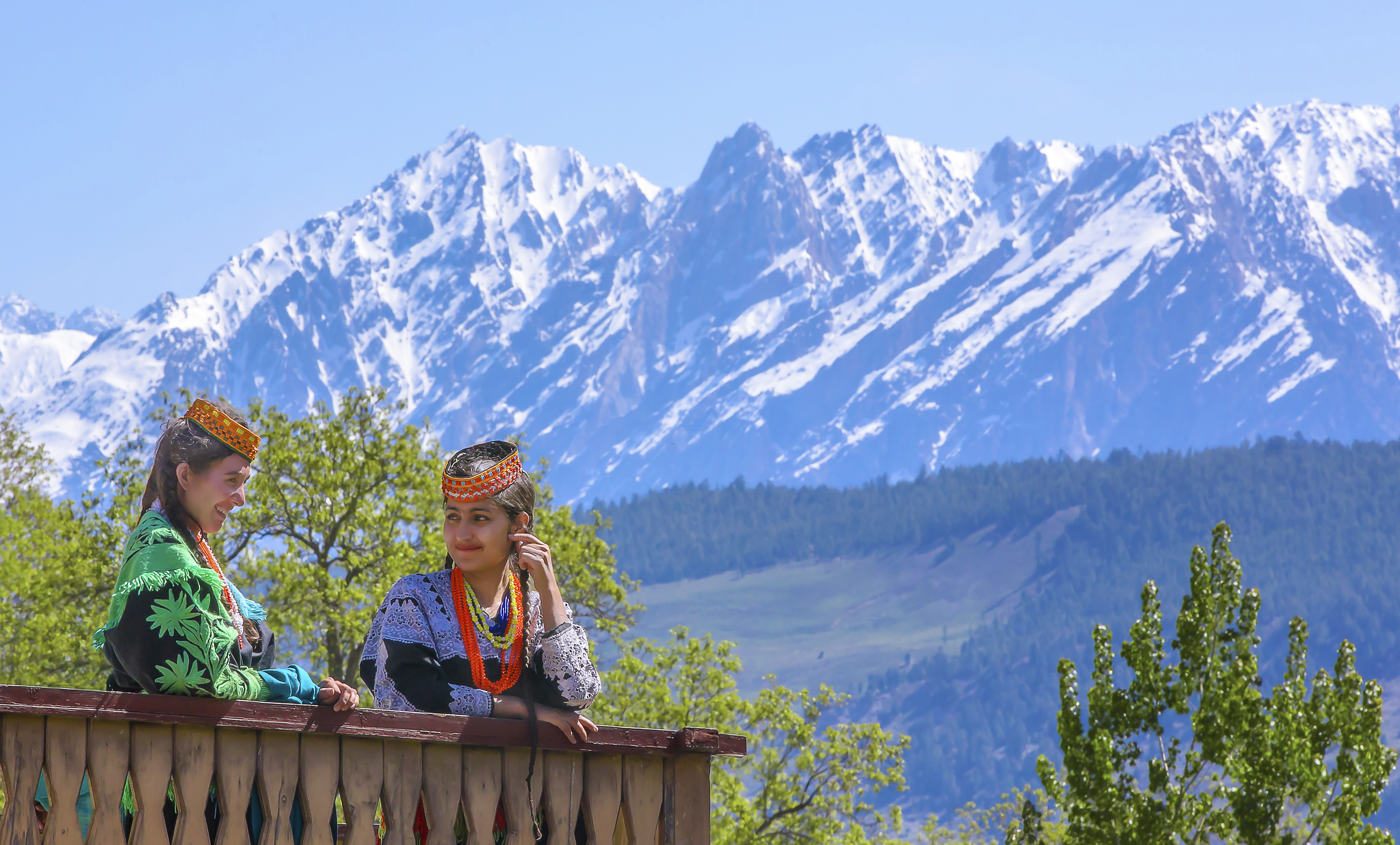
Birir Valley

The Kalash are a small group of Indo-Aryan speaking people. They live in three isolated mountainous valleys located in Chitral, Pakistan: Bumburet (Kalash: Mumuret), Rumbur (Rukmu), and Birir (Biriu). These valleys open towards the Chitral River, some 20 km south (downstream) of Chitral town. The Bumburet and Rumbur valleys join at 35°44′20″N 71°43′40″E (1,640 m), joining the Chitral River at the village of Ayrun (35°42′52″N 71°46′40″E, 1,400 m) and they each rise to passes connecting to Nuristan Province in Afghanistan at about 4,500 m. The Birir Valley opens towards the Chitral River at the village of Gabhirat (35°40′8″N 71°45′15″E, 1,360 m). A pass connects the Birir and Bumburet valleys at about 3,000 m. The Kalash villages in all three valleys are located at a height of approximately 1,900 to 2,200 m.

The region is extremely fertile, with rich oak forests on the mountainsides that support intensive agriculture, much of which is carried out by hand rather than by machinery. The powerful and dangerous rivers that flow through the valleys have been harnessed to power grinding mills and to water the farm fields through the use of ingenious irrigation channels. Wheat, maize, grapes (generally used for wine), apples, apricots and walnuts are among the many foodstuffs grown in the area, along with surplus fodder used for feeding the livestock.

The climate is typical of high elevation regions without large bodies of water to regulate the temperature. The summers are mild and agreeable with average maximum temperatures between 23 and 27 °C (73 and 81 °F). Winters, on the other hand, can be very cold, with average minimum temperatures between 2 and 1 °C (36 and 34 °F). The average yearly precipitation is 700 to 800 mm (28 to 31 inches).

== History ==
=== Origins ===
According to a Kalash tradition, their ancestors migrated some centuries ago to the Chitral Valley from the Waigal Valley (Note: Dani, Ahmad Hasan (2001). History of Northern Areas of Pakistan. Sang-e-Meel Publications. p. 66. ISBN 978-969-35-1231-1.: "Kalasha came from the south, from present day Afghanistan where the Waigal valley is still called Kalashum. It seems that the Kalasha speaking people were expelled from this territory by Nuristani tribes some centuries ago; they left it and pushed up to settle in lower Chiral, which they occupied entirely to be later pushed back in their present location by the Khowar speaking Chitralis or Khos, whose original abode is clearly Northern Chitral.) of Nuristan Province, Afghanistan, or from a location further south called "Tsiyam" in their folk songs and epics, said to be near Jalalabad and Lughman according to Morgenstierne.

According to a tradition, the Kalash descend from the armies of Alexander who were left behind from his armed campaign, though no evidence exists for him to have passed the area. (Note: Richard R. Strand, The kalaṣa of kalaṣüm: "According to their traditions, the Väi fled the Ghaznavid invasion of Kâma, following the Kunar up to mâdeš and samâlâm in the Shigal Valley and thence over the watershed to their main community of väigal. Accounts of the Gawâr people state that the Väi expropriated the current site of Väigal from the Gawâr, who fled to the Kunar Valley. As the Väi expanded, they established the communities listed above. At a probable later time, Âṣkuňu-speaking immigrants from the community of Nakara in the Titin Valley in Laghmân migrated eastward, settled the community of gřâmsaňâ gřâm in the middle Pech Valley, and thence moved further on into the lower Wâigal basin. There they established the community of nišeigrâm and gradually settled the district of čimi, which includes the communities of müldeš, kegal, and akuṇ. The čima-nišei, as these people call themselves, drove out the native preǰvře˜inhabitants to the neighbouring valley of Tregâm. They apparently adopted the language, väi-alâ, of the upper valley inhabitants (varǰan); so that today both the Čima-Nišei and the Väi speak Kalaṣa-alâ, although with a distinct division of dialects. The inhabitants of the hamlet of vânt were originally refugees from later Muslim invaders in Tregâm; they speak Kalaṣa-alâ but are not reckoned as either Väi or Čima-Nišei.")

According to Henry Walter Bellew (1834–1892), the Kalash are the descendants of Gandhari people.

The term is also used to refer to several distinct Nuristani speaking people, including the Väi, the Čima-nišei, the Vântä, plus the Ashkun- and Tregami-speakers.

=== Kingdom of Chitral ===
Shah Nadir Rais (1698–1747) founded the Rais dynasty of Chitral. The Rais invaded southern Chitral, which was then under Kalasha rule. Kalasha traditions recount severe persecution and massacres at the hands of the Rais. Many Kalash fled the Chitral valley; those who remained while still practising their faith had to pay tribute in kind or with corvée labour. The term "Kalash" was used to denote "Kafirs" in general; however, the Kalash of Chitral were not considered "true Kafirs" by the Kati who were interviewed about the term in 1835.

The Kalash were ruled by the Kator dyansty from the 18th century onward. They enjoyed a cordial relationship with the major ethnic group of Chitral, the Kho, who are Sunni and Ismaili Muslims. This multi-ethnic, multi-religious State of Chitral ensured that the Kalash were able to live in peace and harmony and practice their culture and religion. They were protected from Afghan raids by the Chitralis, who also generally did not allow missionaries to Kalash. Instead, the Chitralis allowed the Kalasha to look after their matters themselves.

However, in the 1890s Amir Abdur-Rahman of Afghanistan converted the Nuristanis, neighbours of the Kalash in the region of former Kafiristan west of the border, to Islam on pain of death, and their land was renamed; earlier, the people of Kafiristan had paid tribute to the Mehtar of Chitral and accepted his suzerainty. This ended with the conclusion of the Durand Agreement, under which Kafiristan fell into the Afghan sphere of influence.

=== Modern period ===
Prior to the 1940s the Kalash inhabited five valleys, the current three as well as Jinjeret Kuh and Urtsun to the south. The last Kalash person in Jinjeret Kuh was Mukadar, who passed away in the early 1940s. To perform the old rites, the people of Birir valley just north of Jinjeret came with a moving funeral procession, firing guns and beating drums as they made their way up the valley to celebrate his passing according to the old custom. The event is still remembered in the valleys where Kalash have now converted to Islam.

The Kalash of Urtsun Valley had a culture with a large Kam influence from the Bashgul Valley. It was known for its shrines to Waren and Imro, the Urtsun version of Dezau, which were visited and photographed by Georg Morgenstierne in 1929 and were built in the Bashgul Valley style unlike in other Kalash valleys. The last Shaman was one Azermalik who had been the Dehar when George Scott Robertson visited in the 1890s. His daughter Mranzi who was still alive into the 1980s was the last Urtsun Valley Kalash practising the old religion. She had married into the Birir Valley Kalash and left the valley in the late 1930s when the valley had converted to Islam. Unlike the Kalash of the other valleys the women of Urtsun did not wear the Kup'as headdress but had their own P'acek, a headress worn at casual times, and the famous horned headress of the Bashgul Valley, which was worn at times of ritual and dance. George Scott Robertson put forth the view that the dominant Kafir races like the Wai were refugees who fled to the region. The Kafirs are historically recorded for the first time in 1339.

During the 1970s, some local Muslim missionaries and militants targeted the Kalash. Several attacks by Taliban on the tribe also led to the death of many. However, protection from the government have led to decline in violence against the Kalash. In recent times, the Kalash and Ismailis have been threatened with death by the Taliban. The Pakistani government and the Pakistani military responded by fortifying the security around Kalash villages. The Supreme Court also took judicial intervention to protect the Kalash under both the ethnic minorities clause of the constitution and Pakistan's Sharia law penal code which declares it illegal for Muslims to criticise and attack other religions on grounds of personal belief. The former Pakistani Prime Minister Imran Khan condemned the forced conversions threat as un-Islamic.

In 2017, Wazir Zada became the first Kalasha man to win a seat in the Provincial Assembly of Khyber Pakhtunkhwa. He became the member of the Provincial Assembly (PA) on a minority reserved seat. In November 2019, the Kalash people were visited by the Duke and Duchess of Cambridge, as part of their Pakistan tour and they saw a traditional dance performance there.

== Culture ==
The Kalash have gained attention from anthropologists due to their unique culture. The culture of the Kalash people differs in many ways from the many contemporary Muslim ethnic groups surrounding them in northwestern Pakistan. Nature plays a highly significant and spiritual role in their daily life. As part of their religious tradition, sacrifices are offered and festivals held to give thanks for the abundant resources of their three valleys. Kalasha Desh (the three Kalash valleys) is made up of two distinct cultural areas, the valleys of Rumbur and Bumburet forming one, and Birir Valley the other; Birir Valley being the more traditional of the two.

=== Language ===
The Kalasha language, also known as Kalasha-mun, is an Indo-Aryan language whose closest relative is the neighbouring Khowar language. Kalasha was formerly spoken over a larger area in south Chitral, but it is now mostly confined to the western side valleys, having lost ground to Khowar.

=== Customs ===
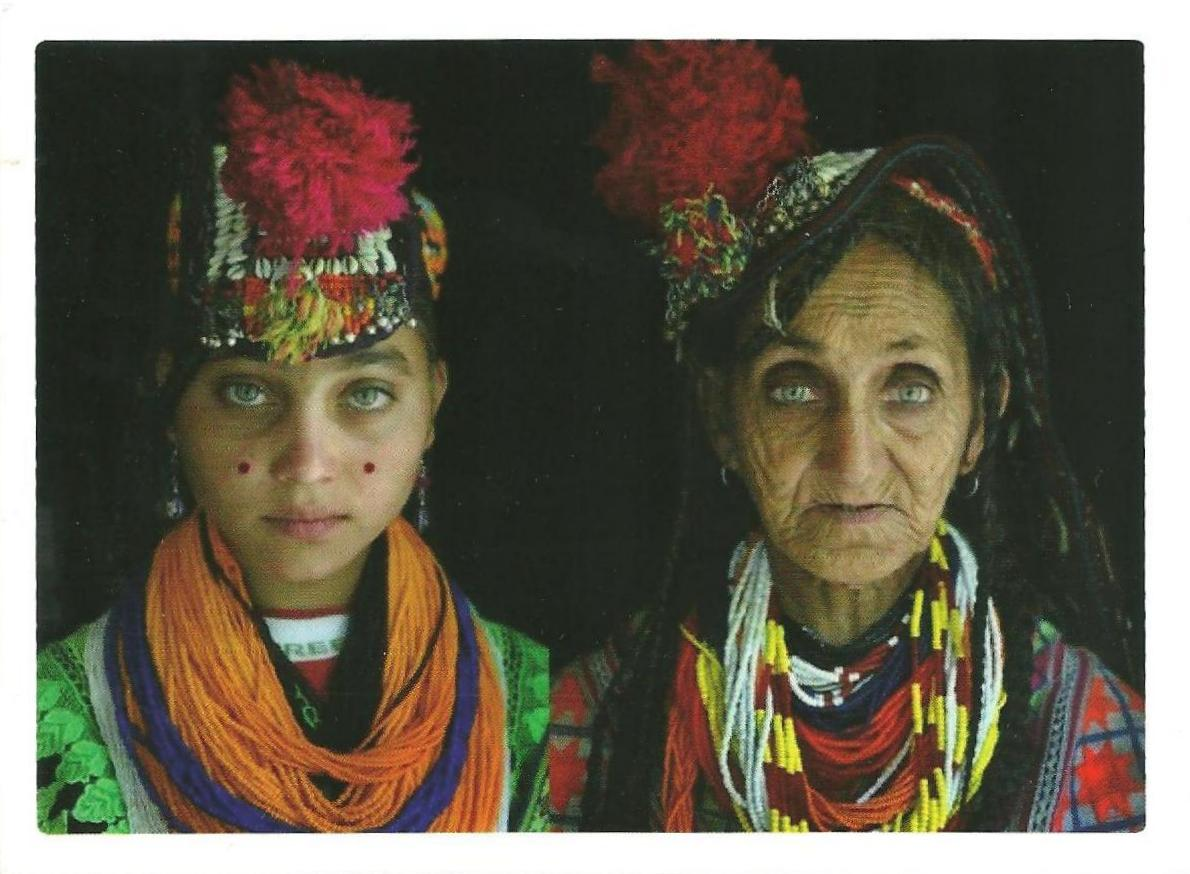
Kalash women

There is some controversy over what defines the ethnic characteristics of the Kalash. Although there was a larger population in the 20th century, the non-Muslim minority has seen its numbers dwindle over the past century. A leader of the Kalash, Saifulla Jan, has stated, "If any Kalash converts to Islam, they cannot live among us anymore. We keep our identity strong." About three thousand have converted to Islam or are descendants of converts, yet still live nearby in the Kalash villages and maintain their language and many aspects of their ancient culture. By now, sheikhs, or converts to Islam, make up more than half of the total Kalasha-speaking population.

Kalasha women usually wear long black robes, often embroidered with cowrie shells. For this reason, they are known in Chitral as "the Black Kafirs". Men have adopted the Pakistani shalwar kameez, while children wear small versions of adult clothing after the age of four.

In contrast to the surrounding culture, the Kalasha do not in general separate males and females or frown on contact between the sexes. However, menstruating girls and women are sent to live in the "bashaleni", the village menstrual building, during their periods, until they regain their "purity". They are also required to give birth in the bashaleni. There is also a ritual restoring "purity" to a woman after childbirth which must be performed before a woman can return to her husband. The husband is an active participant in this ritual.

Girls are initiated into womanhood at an early age of four or five and married at fourteen or fifteen. If a woman wants to change husbands, she will write a letter to her prospective husband informing him of how much her current husband paid for her. This is because the new husband must pay double if he wants her.

Marriage by elopement is rather frequent, also involving women who are already married to another man. Indeed, wife-elopement is counted as one of the "great customs" (ghōna dastūr) together with the main festivals. Wife-elopement may lead in some rare cases to a quasi-feud between clans until peace is negotiated by mediators, in the form of the double bride-price paid by the new husband to the ex-husband.

Kalash lineages (kam) separate as marriageable descendants that have separated by over seven generations. A rite of "breaking agnation" (tatbře čhin) marks that previous agnates (tatbře) are now permissible affines (därak "clan partners"). Each kam has a separate shrine in the clan's Jēṣṭak-hān, the temple to lineal or familial goddess Jēṣṭak.

=== Music ===
Kalasha traditional music mainly consists of flute-like instruments (usually high in pitch), singing, poetry, clapping and the rhythmic playing of drums, which include the:

- wãc – A small hourglass-shaped drum; this is made from 'chizhin' (pine wood), 'kuherik' (pine nut wood), or 'az'a'i' (apricot (tree) wood). It is played with a larger drum called a 'dãu' for the Kalasha dances.
- dãu – A large drum; this is played with a smaller drum called a 'wãc' for the Kalasha dances, the smaller drum giving a lighter counterpart to the larger one.

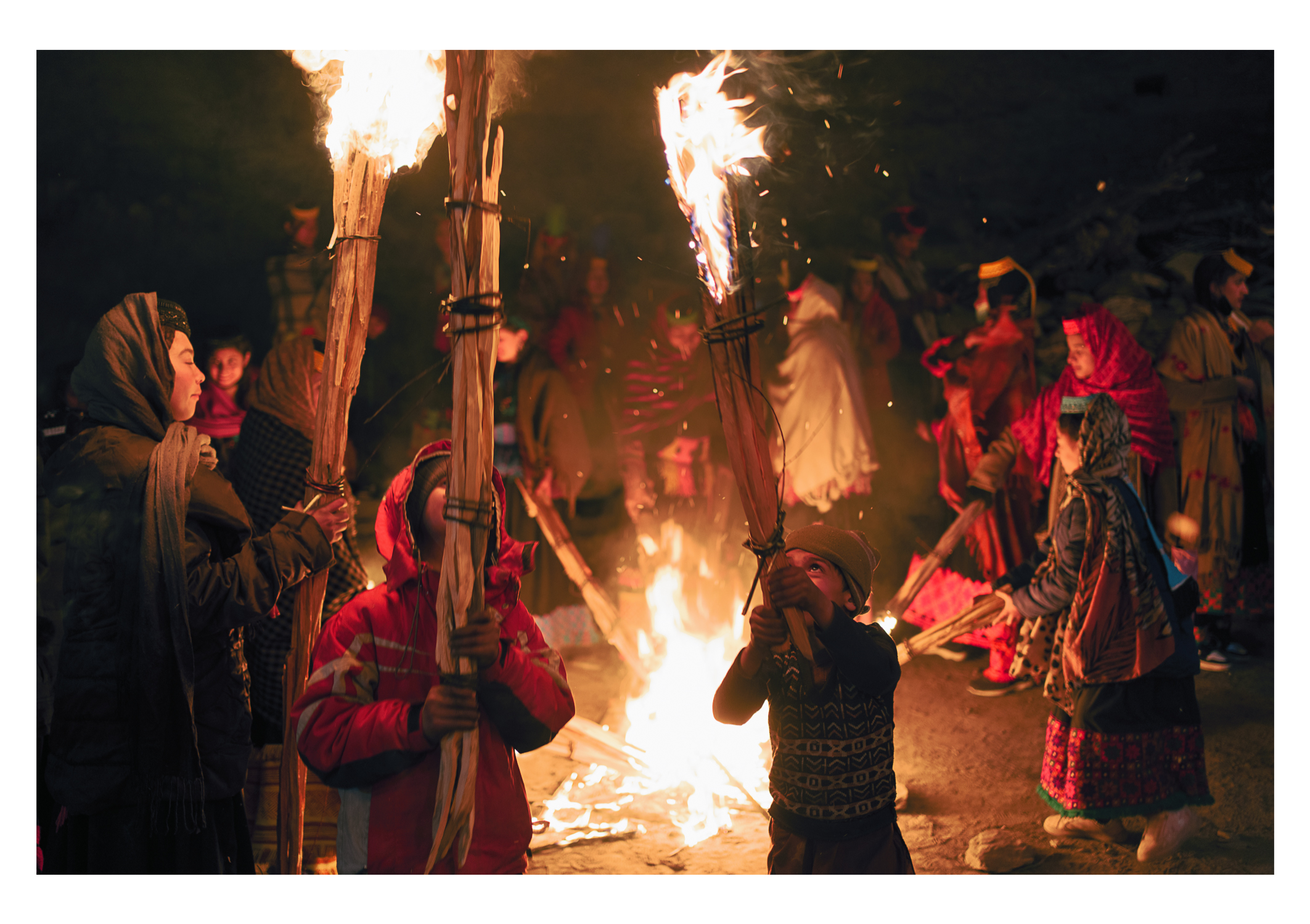
Chowmos, a Kalash end year festival

== Genetic research ==
A study by Rosenberg, Mahajan, et al. (2006) employing genetic testing among the Kalash population concluded that they are a distinct (and perhaps aboriginal) population with only minor contributions from outside peoples. In one cluster analysis (with K = 7), the Kalash formed one cluster, the others being Africans, Europeans/Middle Easterners, South Asians, East Asians, Melanesians, and Native Americans.

Genetic analysis of Mitochondrial DNA (mtDNA) by Quintana-Murci, Chaix, et al. (2004) stated that "the western Eurasian presence in the Kalash population reaches a frequency of 100%" with the most prevalent mtDNA Haplogroups being U4 (34%), R0 (23%), U2e (16%), and J2 (9%). The study found no East or South Asian mtDNA lineages. The authors concluded that the origin of the western Eurasian maternal lineages in Kalash can be traced back to the Middle East.

Genetic analysis of Y-chromosome DNA (Y-DNA) by Firasat, Khaliq, et al. (2007) on Kalash individuals found high and diverse frequencies of these Y-DNA Haplogroups: L3a (22.7%), H1* (20.5%), R1a (18.2%), G (18.2%), J2 (9.1%), R* (6.8%), R1* (2.3%), and L* (2.3%).

A 2025 study by Shahid et al published in Nature shows the following Y haplogroup frequencies in Kalash - R2 (33%), G2a2 (19%), J2b2a (19%), J2a1 (8%), H1a1a (7%), L1c (6%), Q (6%), R1a (2%).

A study by Li, Absher, et al. (2008) with geneticists using more than 650,000 single-nucleotide polymorphisms (SNP) samples from the Human Genome Diversity Panel, found deep rooted lineages that could be distinguished in the Kalash. The results showed them clustered within the Central / South Asian populations (at K = 7). The study also showed the Kalash to be a separated group, having no membership within European populations.

Lazaridis et al. (2016) note that the demographic impact of steppe-related populations on South Asia was substantial. According to the results, the Mala, a south Indian Dalit population with minimal Ancestral North Indian (ANI) along the 'Indian Cline' have nevertheless ~ 18 % steppe-related ancestry, showing the strong influence of ANI ancestry in all populations of India. The Kalash of Pakistan are inferred to have ~ 50 % EMBA steppe-related ancestry, with the rest being of Iranian Neolithic (~29 %), Onge (~16 %) and Han (~5 %).

According to Narasimhan, Patterson, et al. (2019), the Kalash were found to possess the highest ANI ancestry among the population samples analysed in the study.

A study by Ayub, Mezzavilla, et al. (2015) found no evidence of their claimed descent from soldiers of Alexander. The study, however, found that they shared a significant portion of genetic drift with MA-1, a 24,000 year-old Paleolithic Siberian hunter-gatherer fossil and the Yamnaya culture. The researchers thus believe they may be a drifted Ancient Northern Eurasian stock from which some of the modern European and Middle Eastern population also descends. Their mitochondrial lineages are predominantly from western Eurasia. Due to their uniqueness, the researchers believed that they were the earliest group to separate from the ancestral stock of the modern population of the Indian subcontinent estimated around 11,800 years ago.

The estimates by Qamar, Ayub, et al. (2002) of 20%–40% Greek admixture in the Kalash has been dismissed by Kivisild, Rootsi, et al. (2003) stating that:

"some admixture models and programs that exist are not always adequate and realistic estimators of gene flow between populations ... this is particularly the case when markers are used that do not have enough restrictive power to determine the source populations ... or when there are more than two parental populations. In that case, a simplistic model using two parental populations would show a bias towards overestimating admixture".

The study came to the conclusion that the Kalash population estimate by Qamar, Ayub, et al.

is unrealistic and is likely also driven by the low marker resolution that pooled southern and western Asian-specific Y-chromosome Haplogroup H together with European-specific Haplogroup I, into an uninformative polyphyletic cluster 2.

Discover magazine genetics blogger R. Khan has repeatedly cited information indicating that the Kalash are part of the South Asian genetic continuum, with no Macedonian ethnic admixture, albeit shifted towards the Iranian people.

A study by Firasat, Khaliq, et al. (2006) concluded that the Kalash lack typical Greek Haplogroups such as Haplogroup 21 (E-M35). Furthermore, autosomal analysis gave no indication that Kalash were genetically related to Greeks.

== Religion ==
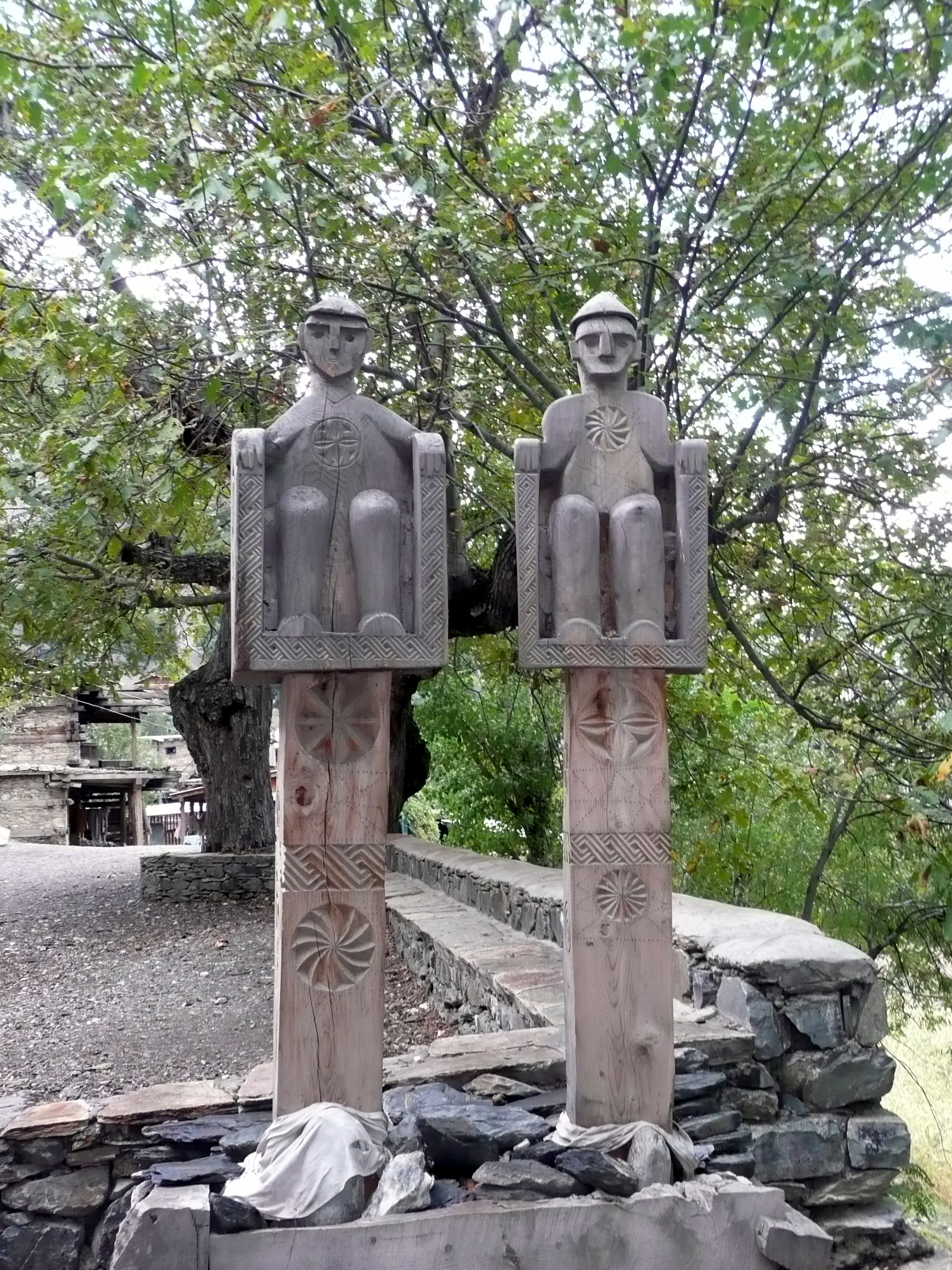
Guardians of a Kalasha village in the valley of Mumuret (Bumburet)

=== Animism, ancestor worship, and Indo-Iranian religion ===
While the majority of the Kalash have converted to Islam, minority of the Kalash people have remained following their traditional Kalasha religion, which is a form of animism and ancestor worship mixed with elements from ancient Indo-Iranian religion and mythology.

According to Witzel, the Kalash religion contains both pre-Vedic and Indo-Iranian elements, but very little post-Vedic influences. (Note: Witzel (2004): "the Hindukush area shares many of the traits of IIr. [Indo-Iranian] myths, ritual, society, and echoes many aspects of Rigvedic, but hardly of post-Rigvedic religion.") Elements of the Kalash mythology and folklore are closely related to the Vedic mythology, and its religion has also been compared to that of ancient Greece.

Kalash culture and belief system differ from the various ethnic groups surrounding them, but are similar to those practised by the neighbouring Nuristanis in northeast Afghanistan before their forced conversion to Islam. Richard Strand, a prominent expert on languages of the Hindu Kush, spent three decades in the Hindukush. He noted the following about the pre-Islamic Nuristani religion:

Before their conversion to Islâm the Nuristânis practised a form of ancient Hinduism, infused with accretions developed locally. They acknowledged a number of human-like deities who lived in the unseen Deity World (Kâmviri d'e lu; cf. Sanskrit deva lok'a-)."

The historical religious practices of neighbouring Pahāṛi peoples of Nepal, Kashmir, Uttarakhand, and Himachal Pradesh are similar to those of the Kalash people in that they "ate meat, drank alcohol, and had shamans". In addition, the Pahāṛi people "had rules of lineage exogamy that produced a segmentary system closely resembling the Kalasha one".

The neighbouring Nuristani people of the adjacent Nuristan (historically known as Kafiristan) province of Afghanistan once had the same culture and practised a faith very similar to that of the Kalash, differing in a few minor particulars.

=== Conversion to Islam and persecution ===
The Kalash of Chitral have maintained their own separate cultural traditions. Nevertheless, some Kalasha have since converted to Islam, mostly as a result of marriages with Muslims.

The first historically recorded Islamic invasions of their lands were by the Ghaznavids in the 11th century while they themselves are first attested in 1339 during Timur's invasions. Nuristan had been forcibly converted to Islam in 1895–96, although some evidence has shown the people continued to practice their customs. During the Muslim rule in Chitral in the 14th century most of the Kalash gradually converted to Islam, except a small number of them who up-hold their religion and customs, but they were restricted to the Kalasha Valleys of Bumburet, Rumbur and Birir.

Being a very small minority in a Muslim region, the Kalash have sometimes been targeted by proselytising Muslim and Christian missionaries. Some of them have encouraged the Kalash people to convert to Islam. The challenges of modernity and the role of outsiders and NGOs in changing the environment of the Kalash valleys have also been mentioned as real threats for the Kalash. The Kalash people are often referred to as Kalash Kafirs by the local Muslims, and there have been incidents of killings, women kidnapping and seizure of their lands by Taliban and extremists. As per the Kalash, forced conversions, robberies, and attacks endanger their culture and faith. In one incident, Kalasha gravestones were desecrated and the symbolic carved horses on Kalasha altars were destroyed after a dispute between Kalash and their Muslim neighbours.

=== Deities ===
Noted linguist and Harvard professor Michael Witzel summarises the faith practised by the Kalash with this description:

In myth it is notably the role of Indra, his rainbow and his eagle who is shot at, the killing of his father, the killing of the snake or of a demon with many heads, and the central myth of releasing the Sun from an enclosure (by Mandi < Mahān Deva). There are echoes of the Puruṣa myth, and there is the cyclical elevation of Yama Rājan (Imra) to sky god (Witzel 1984: 288 sqq., pace Fussman 1977: 70).

Importantly, the division between two groups of deities (Devalog) and their intermarriage (Imra's mother is a 'giant') has been preserved, and this dichotomy is still re-enacted in rituals and festivals, especially the Chaumos. Ritual still is of this type: Among the Kalash it is basically, though not always, temple-less, involving fire, sacred wood, three circumambulations, and the *hotṛ. Some features already have their Vedic, and no longer their Central Asian form (e.g. dragon > snake).

Mahandeo

Mahandeo is a deity whom the Kalash pray to and is known as Mahadev in other languages of the Indian subcontinent in modern Hinduism. (Note: Some of their deities who are worshiped in Kalash tribe are similar to the Hindu god and goddess like Mahadev in Hinduism is called Mahandeo in Kalash tribe. ... All the tribal also visit the Mahandeo for worship and pray. After that they reach to the gree (dancing place).)

Imra

Certain deities were revered only in one community or tribe, but one was universally revered as the Creator: The ancient Hindu god Yama Râja called imr'o in Kâmviri. There is a creator god, appearing under various names, no longer as Father Heaven, but as lord of the nether world and of heaven: Imra (*Yama Rājan), Māra 'death' (Nuristani). He (Yama rajan) is a creator deity called Dezau (ḍezáw) whose name is derived from Indo-European *dheig'h 'to form' (Kati Nuristani dez 'to create', CDIAL 14621); Dezauhe is also called by the Pashto term Khodai. There are a number of other deities, semi-gods and spirits.

Indr

Michael Witzel claims there is an Indra-like figure, often actually called Indr (N., K.) or Varendr (K., waræn, werín, *aparendra). As in the Veda, the rainbow is called after him. When it thunders, Indra is playing Polo. Indra appears, however, in various forms and modern 'disguises', such as Sajigor (Sajigōr), also called Shura Verin. The shrine of Sajigor is in Rumbur valley.

Warén(dr-) or In Warīn is the mightiest and most dangerous god. Even the recently popular Balumain (baḷimaín, K.) has taken over some of Indra's features: He comes from the outside, riding on a horse. Balumain is a culture hero who taught how to celebrate the Kalash winter festival (Chaumos). He is connected with Tsyam, the mythological homeland of the Kalash. Indr has a demon-like counterpart, Jeṣṭan, who appears on earth as a dog; the gods (Devalog, Dewalók) are his enemies and throw stones at him, the shooting stars.

Munjem Malék

Another god, Munjem Malék (munjem 'middle'; malék from Arab. malik 'king'), is the Lord of Middle Earth and killed, like the Indra, his father. Mahandeo (mahandéo, cf. the Nuristani Mon/Māndi), is the god of crops, and also the god of war and a negotiator with the highest deity.

Jestak

Jestak (jéṣṭak, from *jyeṣṭhā, or *deṣṭrī?) is the goddess of domestic life, family and marriage. Her lodge is the women's house (Jeṣṭak Han). Dezalik (ḍizálik), the sister of "Dezau" is the goddess of childbirth, the hearth, and of life force; she protects children and women. She is similar to the Nirmali (Indo-Iranian *nirmalikā). She is also responsible for the Bashaleni lodge.

Suchi, Varōti and Jach

There also is a general pattern of belief in mountain fairies Suchi (súči), who help in hunting and killing enemies, and the Varōti (called vātaputrī in Sanskrit), their violent male partners of Suchi, reflecting the later Vedic (and typical medieval Kashmiri) distinction between Apsaras and Gandharva. They live in the high mountains, such as Mount Kailash like Tirich Mir, but in late autumn they descend to the mountain meadows. The Jach (j.ac.) are a separate category of female spirits of the soil or of special places, fields, and mountain pastures.

The Kalasha people believe in one God (Dezao) with reverence to minor 'gods' (Maloths) or more aptly known as celestial beings. They also use some Arabic and Persian words to refer to God.

Krumai

Krumai is the goddess of the mountain Tirich Mir. She appears in the form of a wild goat, and she is associated with childbirth.

=== Rituals ===
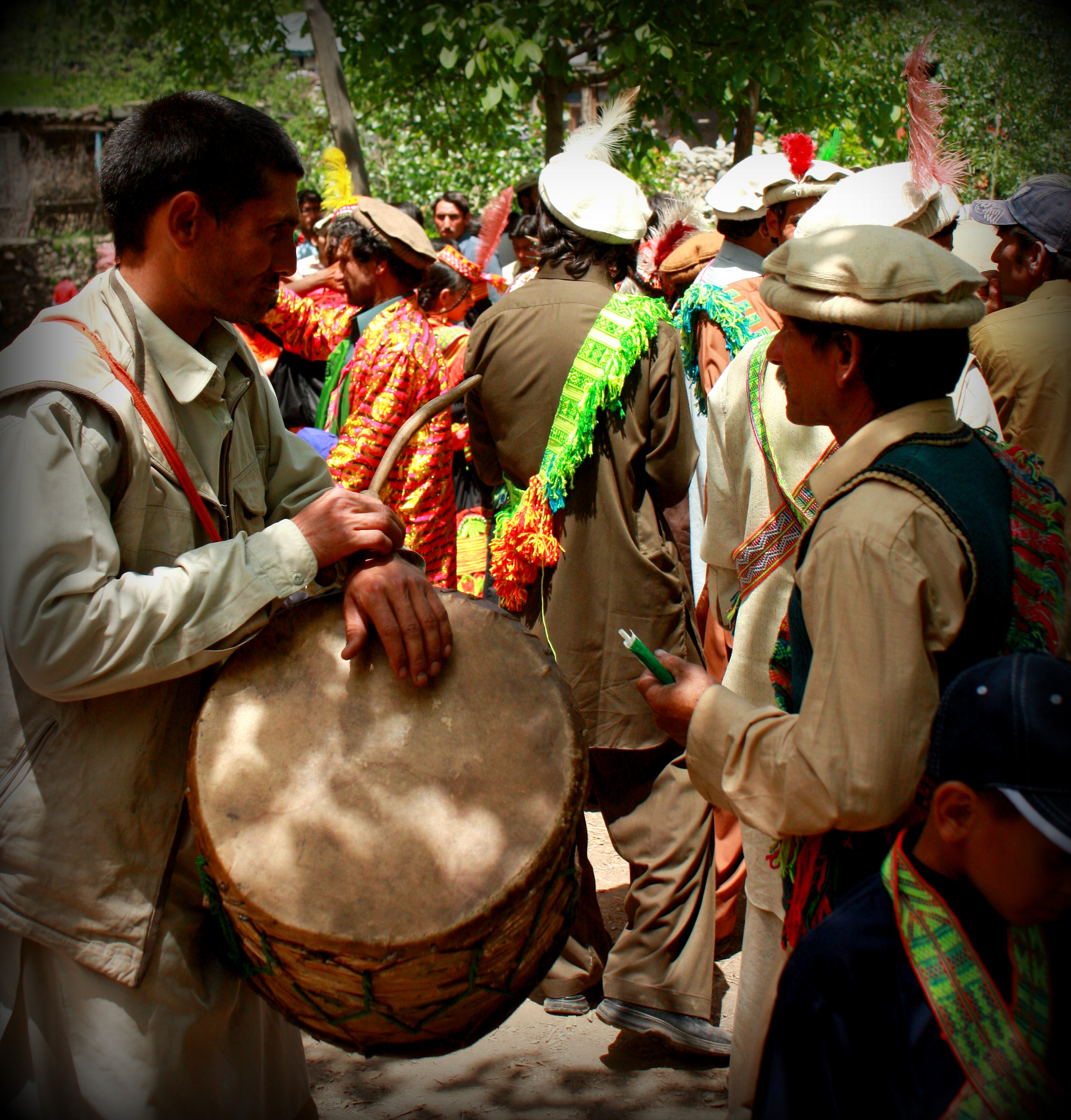
A drummer during the Joshi festival in Bumberet, Pakistan. Drumming is a male occupation among the Kalash people.

These deities have shrines and altars throughout the valleys, where they frequently receive goat sacrifices. In 1929, as Georg Morgenstierne testifies, such rituals were still carried out by Kalash priests, "ištikavan" 'priest' (from ištikhék 'to praise a god'). This institution has since disappeared but there still is the prominent one of shamans (dehar). Witzel writes that "In Kalash ritual, the deities are seen, as in Vedic ritual (and in Hindu Pūjā), as temporary visitors." Mahandeo shrines are a wooden board with four carved horse heads (the horse being sacred to Kalash) extending out, in 1929 still with the effigy of a human head inside holes at the base of these shrines while the altars of Sajigor are of stone and are under old juniper, oak and cedar trees.

Horses, goats and sheep were sacrificed. Wine is a sacred drink of Indr, who owns a vineyard (Indruakun in the Kafiristani wama valley contained both a sacred vineyard and shrine (Idol and altar below a great juniper tree) along with 4 large vates carved out of rocks)—that he defends against invaders. Kalash rituals are of the potlatch type; by organising rituals and festivals (up to 12; the highest called biramōr) one gains fame and status. As in the Veda, the former local artisan class was excluded from public religious functions.

There is a special role for prepubescent boys, who are treated with special awe, combining pre-sexual behaviour and the purity of the high mountains, where they tend goats for the summer month. Purity is very much stressed and centered around altars, goat stables, the space between the hearth and the back wall of houses and in festival periods; the higher up in the valley, the more pure the location.

By contrast, women (especially during menstruation and giving birth), as well as death and decomposition and the outside (Muslim) world are impure, and, just as in the Veda and Avesta, many cleansing ceremonies are required if impurity occurs.

Crows represent the ancestors, and are frequently fed with the left hand (also at tombs), just as in the Veda. The dead are buried above ground in ornamented wooden coffins. Wooden effigies are erected at the graves of wealthy or honoured people.

=== Festivals ===
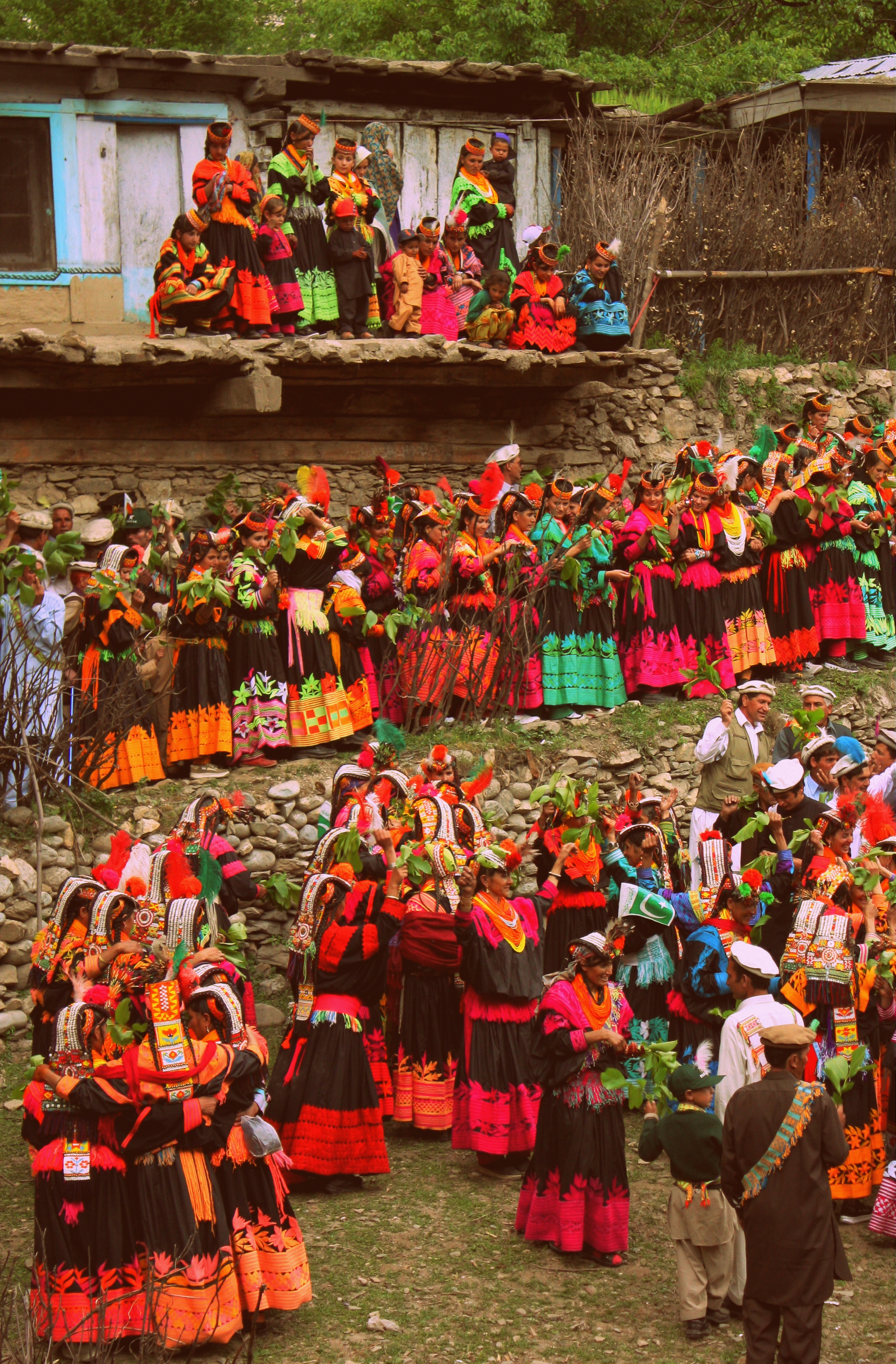
Celebrating Joshi, Kalash women and men dance and sing their way from the dancing ground to the village arena, the Charso, for the end of the day's festivities

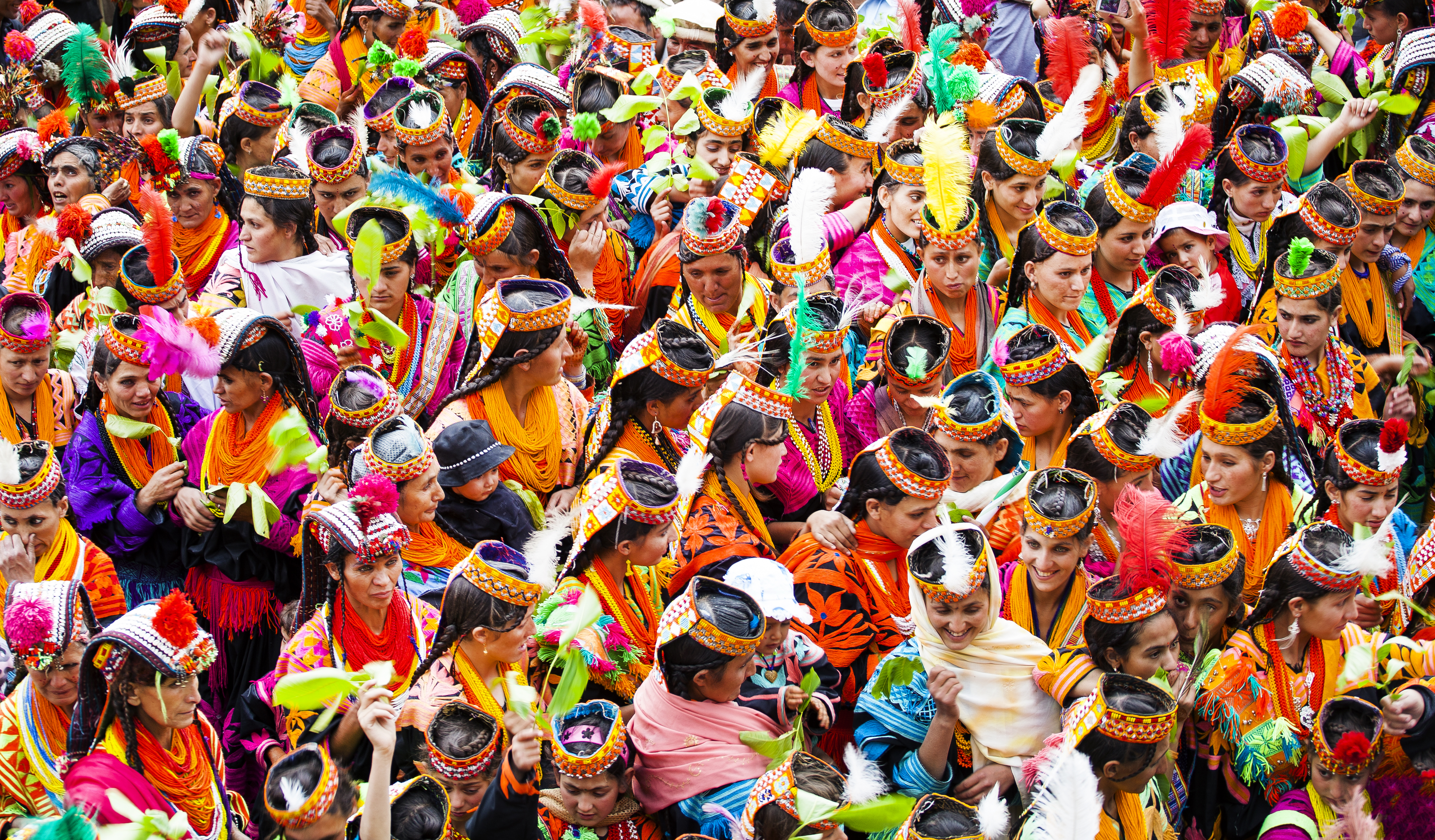
Chilam Joshi festival celebrations

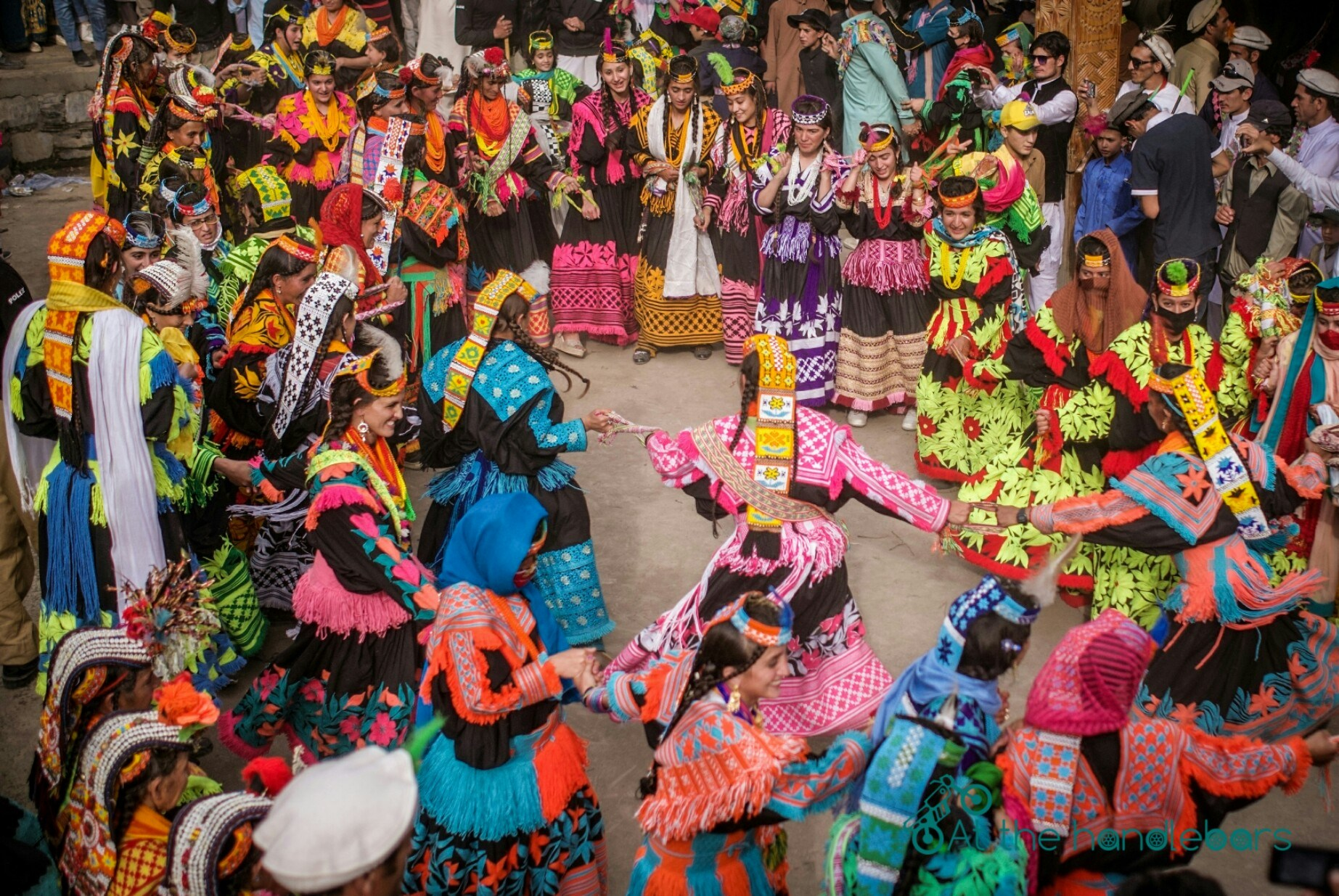
Kalash people in festival

The three main festivals (khawsáṅgaw) of the Kalash are the Chilam Joshi in middle of May, the Uchau in autumn, and the Caumus in midwinter. The pastoral god Sorizan protects the herds in Fall and Winter and is thanked at the winter festival, while Goshidai does so until the Pul festival (pũ. from *pūrṇa, full moon in Sept.) and is thanked at the Joshi (joṣi, žōši) festival in spring. Joshi is celebrated at the end of May each year. The first day of Joshi is "Milk Day", on which the Kalash offer libations of milk that have been saved for ten days prior to the festival.

The most important Kalash festival is the Chawmos (cawmōs, ghona chawmos yat, Khowar "chitrimas" from *cāturmāsya, CDIAL 4742), which is celebrated for two weeks at winter solstice (c. 7–22 December), at the beginning of the month chawmos mastruk. It marks the end of the year's fieldwork and harvest. It involves much music, dancing, and goats killed for consumption as food. It is dedicated to the god Balimain who is believed to visit from the mythical homeland of the Kalash, Tsyam (Tsiyam, tsíam), for the duration of the feast.

At Chaumos, impure and uninitiated persons are not admitted; they must be purified by waving a fire brand over women and children and by a special fire ritual for men, involving a shaman waving juniper brands over the men. The 'old rules' of the gods (Devalog, dewalōk) are no longer in force, as is typical for year-end and carnival-like rituals. The main Chaumos ritual takes place at a Tok tree, a place called Indra's place, "indrunkot", or "indréyin". Indrunkot is sometimes believed to belong to Balumain's brother, In(dr), lord of cattle.

The men must be divided into two parties: the pure ones have to sing the well-honored songs of the past, but the impure sing wild, passionate, and obscene songs, with an altogether different rhythm. This is accompanied by a 'sex change': men dress as women, women as men (Balumain also is partly seen as female and can change between both forms at will).

At this crucial moment the pure get weaker, and the impure try to take hold of the (very pure) boys, pretend to mount them "like a hornless ram", and proceed in snake procession. At this point, the impure men resist and fight. When the "nagayrō" song with the response "han sarías" (from *samrīyate 'flows together', CDIAL 12995) is voiced, Balumain showers all his blessings and disappears. He gives his blessings to seven boys (representing the mythical seven of the eight Devalog who received him on arrival), and these pass the blessings on to all pure men.

In myth, Mahandeu had cheated Balumain from superiority, when all the gods had slept together (a euphemism) in the Shawalo meadow; therefore, he went to the mythical home of the Kalash in Tsiyam (tsíam), to come back next year like the Vedic Indra (Rigveda 10.86). If this had not happened, Balumain would have taught humans how to have sex as a sacred act. Instead, he could only teach them fertility songs used at the Chaumos ritual. He arrives from the west, the Bashgal valley, in early December, before solstice, and leaves the day after. He was at first shunned by some people, who were annihilated. He was, however, received by seven Devalog and they all went to several villages, such as Batrik village, where seven pure, young boys received him whom he took with him. Therefore, nowadays, one only sends men and older boys to receive him. Balumain is the typical culture hero. He told people about the sacred fire made from junipers, about the sowing ceremony for wheat that involved the blood of a small goat, and he asked for wheat tribute (hushak) for his horse. Finally, Balumain taught how to celebrate the winter festival. He was visible only during his first visit, now he is just felt to be present.

== Economy ==
Historically a goat herding and subsistence farming people, the Kalasha are moving towards a cash-based economy whereas previously wealth was measured in livestock and crops. Tourism now makes up a large portion of the economic activities of the Kalash. To cater to these new visitors, small shops and guest houses have been erected, providing new luxury for visitors of the valleys. People attempting to enter the valleys have to pay a toll to the Pakistani government, which is used to preserve and care for the Kalash people and their culture. After building the first road which could be driven on by 4wD vehicles in the Kalasha valleys in the mid-1970s the people are engaged in other professions including tourism and joining the military, police and border force.

== See also ==
- Suri Jagek
- Burusho people
- Brokpa people

== Sources ==
Printed sources

- Ahmed, Akbar S. (1986). "The Islamization of the Kalash Kafirs". Pakistan Society: Islam, ethnicity, and leadership in South Asia. New York, NY: Mayflower Books. pp. 23–28. ISBN 978-0-19-577350-7.
- Böck, Monika; Rao, Aparna, eds. (2000). Culture, Creation, and Procreation: Concepts of Kinship in South Asian Practice. Berghahn Books. p. 277. ISBN 978-1-57-181912-3.
- Cacopardo, Augusto S. (2016) Pagan Christmas. Winter Feasts of the Kalasha of the Hindu Kush. Gingko Library. London.
- Cacopardo, Augusto S. (2016). Pagan Christmas: Winter Feasts of the Kalasha of the Hindu Kush. Gingko Library. ISBN 978-1-909942-85-1.
- Mytte Fentz, The Kalasha. Mountain People of the Hindu Kush. Rhodos Publishers, Copenhagen 2010. ISBN 9788772459745.
- Maraini Fosco, Gli ultimi pagani, Bur, Milano, 2001.
- Paolo Graziosi, The Wooden Statue of Dezalik, a Kalash Divinity, Chitral, Pakistan, Man (1961).
- Viviane Lièvre, Jean-Yves Loude, Kalash Solstice: Winter Feasts of the Kalash of North Pakistan, Lok Virsa (1988)
- D. Levinson et al., Encyclopedia of world cultures, MacMillan Reference Books (1995).
- Lines, Maureen (1996). The Kalasha People of North-Western Pakistan. Emjay Books International. p. 49.
- Anwaar Mohyuddin, Religion as a Space for Kalash Identity: A Case Study of Village Bumburetin Kalash Valley, District Chitral Archived 8 April 2022 at the Wayback Machine
- Georg Morgenstierne, 1973. Indo-Iranian Frontier Languages, Vol. IV: The Kalasha Language. Oslo.
- Georg Morgenstierne, 1947. The spring festival of the Kalash Kafirs.In: India Antiqua. Fs. J.Ph. Vogel. Leiden: Brill, pp 240–248
- Parkes, Peter (1987). "Livestock Symbolism and Pastoral Ideology among the Kafirs of the Hindu Kush." Man 22:637-60
- Pelton, Robert Young (1997). Fielding's The World's Most Dangerous Places. Fielding Worldwide. ISBN 978-1-56952-140-3.
- Raza, M. Hanif (1998). Heavens of Hindukush. Colorpix. p. 123. ISBN 978-969-8010-13-3.
- Sir George Scott Robertson, 1896. The Kafirs of The Hindu-Kush, London: Lawrence & Bullen Ltd.
- Ruhland, Heike (2019). Peacebuilding in Pakistan: A Study on the Religious Minorities and Initiatives for Interfaith Harmony. Münster: Waxmann Verlag.
- Searle, Mike (2013). Colliding Continents: A geological exploration of the Himalaya, Karakoram, and Tibet. OUP Oxford. ISBN 978-0-19-165249-3.
- Trail, Gail H, Tsyam revisited: a study of Kalasha origins. In: Elena Bashir and Israr-ud-Din (eds.), Proceedings of the second International Hindukush Cultural Conference, 359–76. Hindukush and Karakoram Studies, 1. Karachi: Oxford University Press (1996).
- Vinogradov, A.G.; Zharnikova, S.V. (2020). Indo-European Ornamental Complexes and their Analogs in the Cultures of Eurasia. Admit Hub Ref Service PR.
- West, Barbara A. (2010). Encyclopedia of the Peoples of Asia and Oceania. Infobase Publishing. p. 357. ISBN 978-1-4381-1913-7.
- Witzel, Michael (2004). "Kalash Religion (extract from 'The Ṛgvedic Religious System and its Central Asian and Hindukush Antecedents')" (PDF). In A. Griffiths; J. E. M. Houben (eds.). The Vedas: Texts, Language and Ritual. Groningen: Forsten. pp. 581–636. Archived (PDF) from the original on 28 September 2024.
- Zaheer-ud-Din (2015). "Muslim Impact on Religion and Culture of the Kalash" (PDF). Da"wah Academy, International Islamic University. Archived (PDF) from the original on 5 April 2023.

Web-sources
