= Lower Chitral District =

District in Pakistan

Lower Chitral District موڑی ݯھیترارو ضلع ضلع چترالِ زیریں
- District of Khyber Pakhtunkhwa
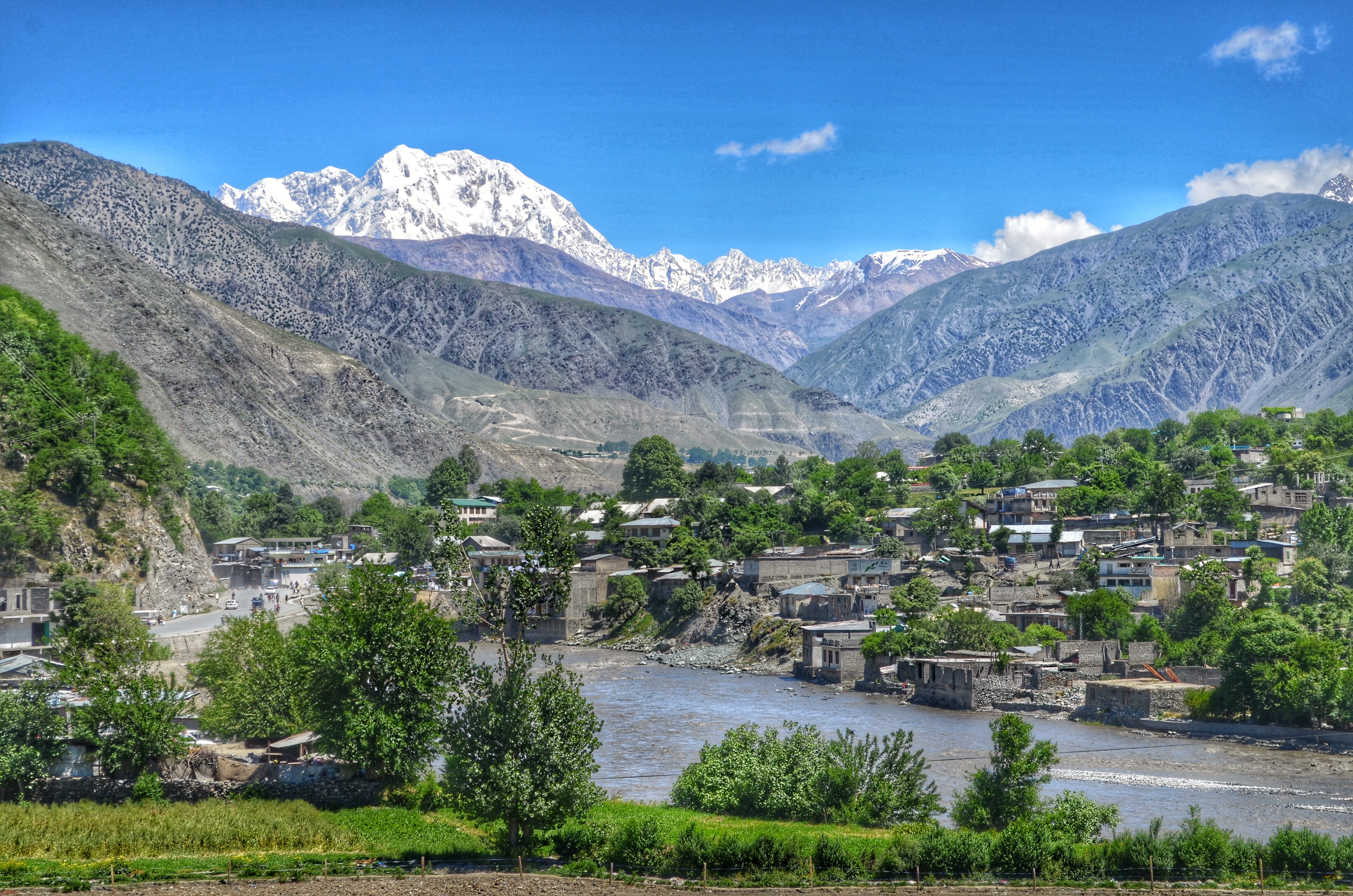
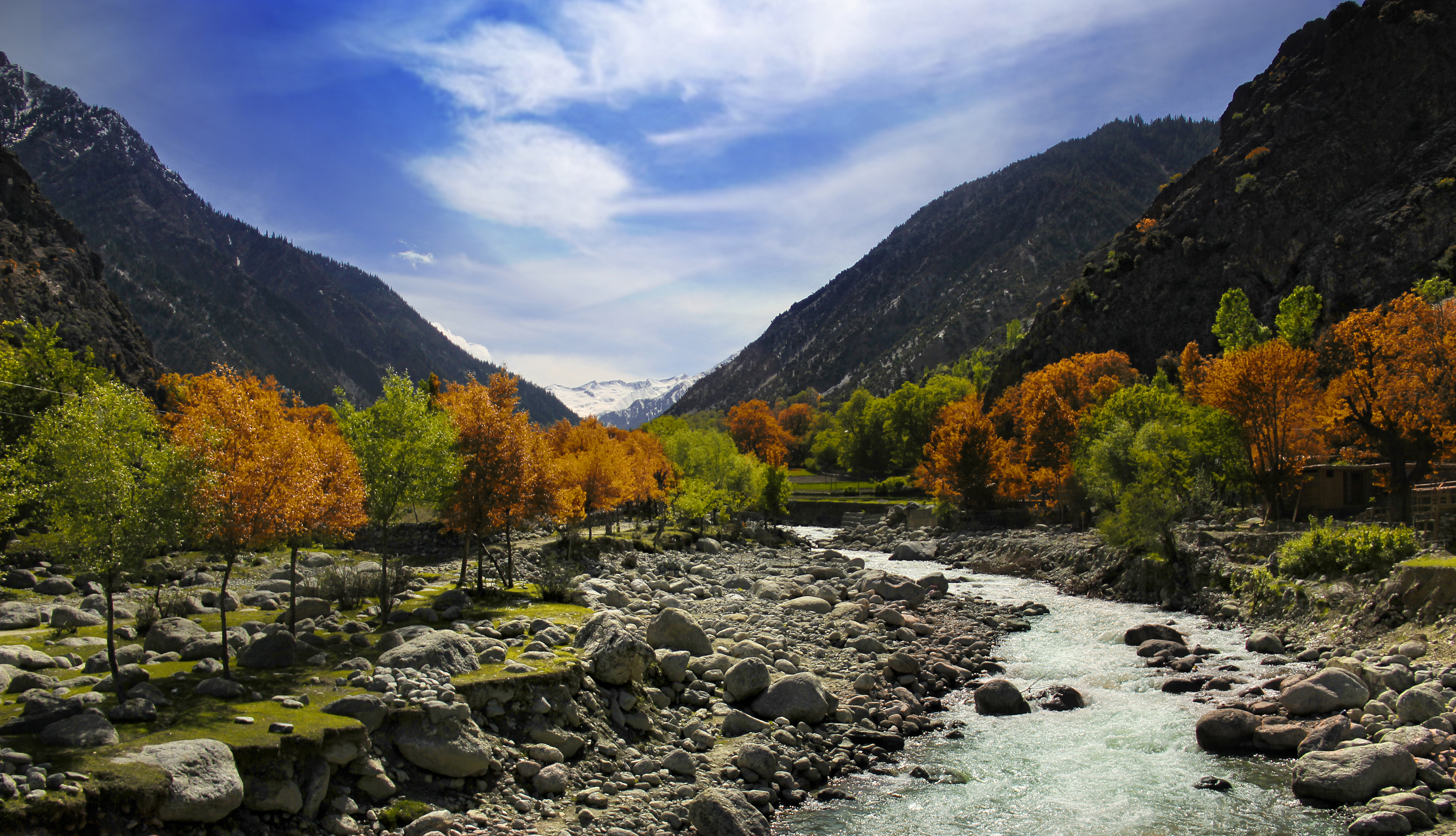
- Top: Chitral city with Tirich Mir in the background Bottom: Bumburet, one of the Kalasha Valleys

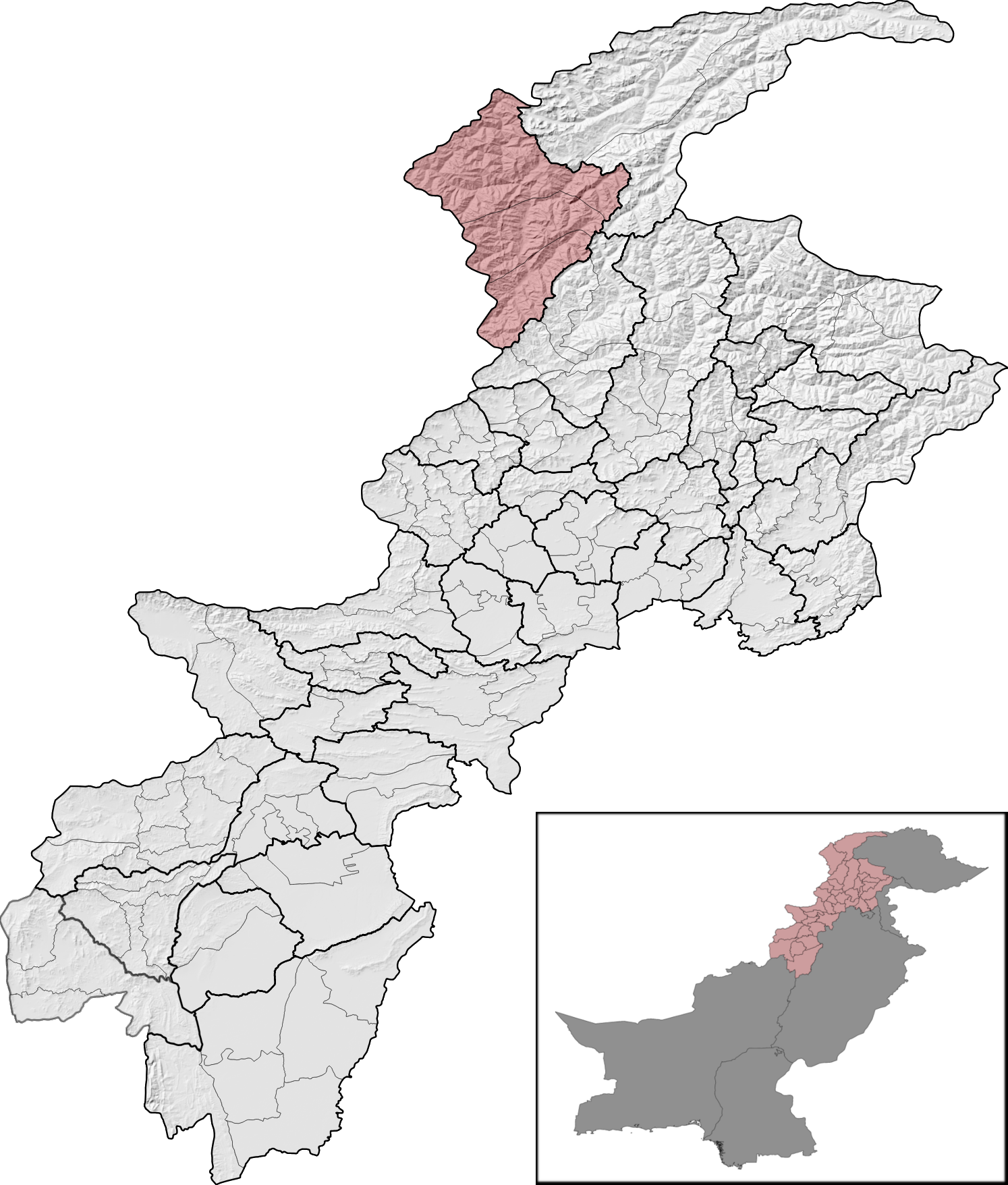
- Lower Chitral District (red) in Khyber Pakhtunkhwa
- Country: Pakistan
- Province: Khyber Pakhtunkhwa
- Division: Malakand
- Established: 2018
- Headquarters: Chitral town

Government
  - Type: District Administration
  - Deputy Commissioner: Muhammad Ali Khan (BPS-20 PCS)
  - District Police Officer: Iftikhar Shah (PSP)
  - District Health Officer: Doctor Muhammad Shamim

Area
  - Total: 6,458 km^{2} (2,493 sq mi)

Population (2023)
  - Total: 320,407
  - Density: 49.61/km^{2} (128.5/sq mi)

Literacy
  - Literacy rate: Total: 66.10%; Male: 76.81%; Female: 54.77%
- Time zone: UTC+5 (PST)
- Number of Tehsils: 2
- Website: lowerchitral.kp.gov.pk

Lower Chitral District (Khowar: موڑی ݯھیترارو ضلع; Urdu: ضلع چترال زیریں) is a district in Malakand Division of Khyber Pakhtunkhwa province in Pakistan. Kho people are the dominant ethnic group in the district, and almost 90% of the population speaks Khowar as their mother tongue.

== Demographics ==
Historical population
| Year | Pop. | ±% p.a. |
|---|---|---|
| 1961 | 54,844 | — |
| 1972 | 87,617 | +4.35% |
| 1981 | 121,641 | +3.71% |
| 1998 | 184,874 | +2.49% |
| 2017 | 278,328 | +2.18% |
| 2023 | 320,407 | +2.37% |

As of the 2023 census, Lower Chitral district has 46,028 households and a population of 320,407. The district has a sex ratio of 104.31 males to 100 females and a literacy rate of 66.10%: 76.81% for males and 54.77% for females. 87,378 (27.46% of the surveyed population) are under 10 years of age. 57,157 (17.84%) live in urban areas.

Languages of Lower Chitral District (2023)
1. (mainly Khowar) (87.8%)
2. Pashto (9.36%)
3. Kalasha (1.59%)
4. Others (1.29%)

87.76% of the population speaks languages classified as 'Others', namely Khowar (or Chitrali), the dominant language of Chitral as a whole. Pashto is spoken in the southeast of the district by 9.36% of the population, while Kalasha is spoken by 1.59% of the population. There are some speakers of the Madaklasht dialect, a Persian dialect which is considered a mix of Dari and Tajik.

=== Ethnic groups ===
The main ethnic groups in the district are:

- Kho people
- Gujjar
- Kalash

=== Religion ===
| Religion | 1998 | | 2017 | | 2023 | |
| Religion | Pop. | % | Pop. | % | Pop. | % |
|---|---|---|---|---|---|---|
| Islam | 182,169 | 98.54% | 274,426 | 98.60% | 313,101 | 98.39% |
| Kalash | 2,602 | 1.41% | 3,725 | 1.34% | 4,617 | 1.45% |
| Christianity | 50 | 0.03% | 165 | 0.06% | 509 | 0.16% |
| Hinduism | 2 | 0.00% | 9 | 0.00% | 4 | 0.00% |
| Ahmadi | 51 | 0.03% | 3 | 0.00% | 2 | 0.00% |
| Total | 184,874 | 100.00% | 278,328 | 100.00% | 318,234 | 100.00% |

== Administrative Divisions ==
| Tehsil | Area (km²) | Pop. (2023) | Density (ppl/km²) (2023) | Literacy rate (2023) | Union Councils |
|---|---|---|---|---|---|
| Chitral Tehsil | 6,127 | 211,374 | 34.5 | 70.20% | |
| Drosh Tehsil | 331 | 109,033 | 329.4 | 57.38% | |

== National Assembly ==
The district, along with Upper Chitral District, is represented by one elected MNA (Member of National Assembly) in the Pakistan National Assembly. Its constituency is NA-1.

| Member of National Assembly | Party affiliation | Year |
|---|---|---|
| Abdul Latif | PTI | 2024 |

== Provincial Assembly ==
The district is represented by one elected MPA (Member of Provincial Assembly) in Khyber Pakhtunkhwa Assembly. Its constituency is PK-2.

| Member of Khyber Pakhtunkhwa Assembly | Party affiliation | Year |
|---|---|---|
| Fateh-ul-Mulk Ali Nasir | PTI | 2024 |
