= Provincial highways of Khyber Pakhtunkhwa =

The Provincial Highways of Khyber Pakthunkhwa consists of all public highways maintained by the Pakistani province of Khyber Pakhtunkhwa. The Pakhtunkhwa Highways Authority under the Department of Transportation maintains over 2,388 kilometres (1,484 mi) of roadways organised into various classifications which crisscross the province and provide access to major population centres. All provincial highways in Khyber Pakthunkhwa are pre-fixed with the letter 'S' followed by the unique numerical designation of the specific highway (with a hyphen in the middle), i.e. S-1, S-2, S-3, etc. These are not to be confused with national highways which are federal roads maintained by the Government of Pakistan and the National Highway Authority.

== List of provincial highways ==
Provincial Highways of Khyber Pakhtunkhwa
Highway	Course	Length	Existing	Via	Lanes	Remarks
S-1	Peshawar – Taxila	194 km	194 km	via Charsadda – Mardan – Swabi – Topi – Ghazi – Sirikot – Panian – Haripur – Hattar	2	Completed
S-1A	Naguman – Pir Qilla	17 km	17 km	via Shabqadar	2	Completed
S-1B	Mardan Ring Road	34 km	34 km		2	Completed
S-1C	Adina-Chota Lahore Road	29 km	29 km	via Yar Hussain	2	Completed
S-2	Chitral – Shandur	172 km	172 km	via Mastuj	2	Completed
S-3	Batkhela – Dargai	80 km	80 km	via Khar – Dheri – Julagram – Totakan – Qulangi – Agra – Kot – Haryan Kot	2	Completed
S-3B	Chakdara – Dheri	80 km	80 km	via Shamozai – Kabal – Kanju – Matta	2	Completed
S-4	Timergara – Peshawar	169 km	169 km	via Munda – Khar – Nawagai – Ghallanai – Pir Qilla	2	Completed
S-4A	Munda – Chokiatan	97 km	97 km	via Samarbagh – Shahi	2	Completed
S-4B	Timergara – Barawal	53 km	53 km	via Maidan – Kalpani	2	Completed
S-5	Maqsood – Abbottabad	117 km	117 km	via Lora – Ghora Galli – Barrian – Nathiagali	2	Completed
S-5A	Kuza Gali – Khanpur	7 km	7 km	via Ayubia	2	Completed
S-5B	Sarai Saleh – Serian	12 km	12 km	via Rehana	2	Completed
S-5C	Kohala – Islamabad	20 km	20 km	via Pir Sohawa	2	Completed
S-6	Swabi – Khushalgarh	123 km	123 km	via Jehangira – Khairabad – Nizampur	2	Completed
S-6A	Nowshera – Nizampur	35 km	35 km	via Manki	2	Completed
S-7	Kohat – Parachinar	194 km	194 km	via Hangu – Thall – Chapari	2	Completed
S-8	Thall – Darya Khan	66 km	66 km	via Mir Ali – Isha – Razmak – Khirgi – Tank – Dera Ismail Khan	2	Completed
S-8A	Giloti – Mastung	146 km	146 km	via Hatala – Kulachi	2	Completed
S-9	Nowshera – Shergarh	73 km	73 km	via Charsaada – Umerzai – Harichand – Kulachi	2	Completed
S-9A	Takht Bhai – Rajjar	22 km	22 km		2	Completed
S-10	Shahbazgara – Barikot	103 km	103 km	via Rustam – Ambila – Daggar – Karakar	2	Completed
S-10A	Swarai – Puran	65 km	65 km	via Dewana Baba – Batar – Sarqilla – Chowga	2	Completed
S-11	Tajazai – Dera Ismail Khan	155 km	155 km	via Lakki – Daratang – Chashma	2	Completed
S-11A	Indus Highway – Bannu	36 km	36 km		2	Completed
S-11B	Indus Highway – Paharkhel	19 km	19 km		2	Completed
S-12	Mansehra – Haripur	167 km	167 km	via Darban – Chappar	2	Completed
S-13	Ring Road around Peshawar	35 km	35 km		2, 6	Completed
In total		2555 km	2555 km			

== List of provincial controlled-access highways ==
Provincial Highways of Khyber Pakhtunkhwa
Highway	Course	Length	Existing	Via	Lanes	Remarks
Chakdara–Mingora Expressway	Chakdara – Mingora	40 km	km	via Shamozai	4	Proposed
Chamkani–Badaber Expressway	Chamkani – Badaber	32 km	km		4	Proposed
In total		177 km				

== See also ==
- Motorways of Pakistan
- National Highways of Pakistan
- Transport in Pakistan
- National Highway Authority
