= Gilgit–Shandur Road =

Road in Pakistan

Gilgit–Shandur Road گلگت– شندور سڑک

Route information
- Maintained by National Highways of Pakistan
- Length: 216 km (134 mi)

Major junctions
- From: Gilgit (from N-35)
- To: Shandur (continues as KP Highway 2)

Location
- Country: Pakistan

Highway system
- Roads in Pakistan

The Gilgit–Shandur Road (Urdu: گلگت – شندور سڑک) is a 216 km national highway in Pakistan linking Gilgit with Shandur. From Shandur, the road continues and crosses into Khyber Pakhtunkhwa province, where it becomes the Chitral–Shandur Road or KP Highway 2. In 2013, the Gilgit-Baltistan Legislative Assembly unanimously passed a resolution demanding that both the roads be "renamed" to a single Gilgit–Chitral Road and be upgraded. After 2020 its a part of the National Highway network, identified as N-140.

== See also ==
- Provincial Highways of Gilgit-Baltistan
