= Khyber Pakhtunkhwa Highway S-1 =

Road in Pakistan

Highway S–1

Route information
- Maintained by Pakhtunkhwa Highways Authority
- Length: 194 km (121 mi)
- Existed: 1962–present

Major junctions
- East end: Peshawar
- Peshawar Ring Road; Peshawar Northern Bypass; Mardan Ring Road (East); N-45 National Highway; Mardan Ring Road (West); N-35 National Highway
- West end: Hattar

Location
- Country: Pakistan
- Major cities: Charsadda; Mardan; Swabi; Topi; Sirikot; Panian; Haripur

Highway system
- Roads in Pakistan

Khyber Pakhtunkhwa Highway S-1 is a 194-kilometre-long (121 mi) provincial highway which extends from Peshawar to Hattar in Khyber Pakhtunkhwa province, Pakistan. Originally several separate roads, the Pakhtunkhwa Highways Authority merged them together to form one continuous road.

== Route ==
- Peshawar-Charsadda Road
- Charsadda-Mardan Road
- Mardan-Swabi Road
- Swabi-Topi Road
- Topi-Ghazi Road
- Ghazi-Sirikot Road
- Sirikot-Haripur Road
- Kot Najibullah Road

== See also ==
Provincial Highways of Khyber Pakhtunkhwa
