= Chuinj =

Pakistani village

Chuinj چوئنج
- valley
- Location within Pakistan
- Coordinates: 36°19′02″N 72°34′23″E
- Country: Pakistan
- Province: Khyber Pakhtunkhwa
- District: Upper Chitral
- Tehsil: Mastuj

Languages
  - National: Urdu
  - Regional: Khowar (Chitrali)
- Time zone: UTC+5 (PKT)

Chuinj (Urdu, Khowar: چوئنج) is a valley located in Mastuj Tehsil of Upper Chitral District, in the province of Khyber Pakhtunkhwa, Pakistan.

== Demographics ==
=== Population ===
The locals speak Khowar and engage in subsistence agriculture, livestock herding, and seasonal labor. Chuinj has an estimated population of around 2,098 people, based on the 2017 census data for Chuinj Bala (چوئنج بالا) and Chuinj Payeen (چوئنج پائیں).

=== Religion ===
The population of Chuinj is predominantly Muslim, following the Ismaili branch of Shia doctrine.

== Flooding and Natural Hazards ==
Chuinj has faced repeated flooding over the past several decades. These floods have destroyed orchards, homes, water channels, and livestock, threatening the livelihood of residents. Experts have linked the flooding to glacial melt and inadequate water management infrastructure.

== Notable personalities ==
- Sana Yousaf (2007 or 2008 – 2025), Pakistani social media influencer

== See also ==
- Buni, a town and the headquarters of Upper Chitral
