= Provincial highways of Gilgit-Baltistan =

The provincial highways of Gilgit-Baltistan consists of all public highways maintained by Gilgit-Baltistan, Pakistan. The Gilgit-Baltistan Highway Department under the Planning & Development Department maintains over 715 kilometres (444 mi) of roadways organised into various classifications which crisscross the province and provide access to major population centers. These are not to be confused with national highways which are federal roads maintained by the Government of Pakistan and the National Highway Authority.

== List of Highways ==
Highways of Gilgit-Baltistan
Ref	English Name	Urdu Name	Course	Length	Existing	Via	Lanes	Remarks
S-1	Baltistan Highway	شاہراہِ بلتستان	Juglot – Skardu	167 km	167 km	via	2	Complete
	Khaplu–Gayari Road		Khaplu – Gayari	88 km	86 km	via	1	Complete
	Sakisa–Gyong La Road		Sakisa – Gyong La	24 km	24 km	via	1	Complete
	Siachen Highway	شاہراہِ سیاچن	Skardu – Khaplu	96 km	96 km	via	2	Complete
	Kargil Highway	شاہراہِ کارگل	Skardu – Kharmang	126 km	126 km	via	1	Complete
	K2 Highway	شاہراہِ کے ٹو	Skardu – Dassu	35 km	35 km	via Shigar	2	Complete
	Gilgit–Nomal–Naltar Road; Naltar Valley Road		Gilgit – Nomal - Naltar Lake	55 km	55 km	via	2	Complete
	Gilgit–Shandur Road (Taken over by NHA)		Gilgit – Shandur	212 km	212 km	via	2	Complete; Continues as KP Highway 2
	Gahkuch–Ishkoman Road; Ishkoman Valley Road		Gahkuch – Ishkoman	48 km	48 km	via	1	Complete
	Karambar River Road		Ishkoman – Karambar Glacier	33 km	33 km	via	1	Complete
	Ganish–Nagar–Hispar Road		Ganish – Hispar	39 km	39 km	via Nagar Khas	1	Complete
	Nagar–Hoppar Road		Nagar – Hopar	13 km	136 km	via	1	Complete
	Sas Valley Road		Murtazaabad – Nagar Khas	16 km	16 km	via	1	Complete
	In total			715 km	715 km			

== See also ==
- Motorways of Pakistan
- National Highways of Pakistan
- Transport in Pakistan
- National Highway Authority
