= Chitral–Shandur Road =

Road in Pakistan

Highway S–2

Route information
- Maintained by Pakhtunkhwa Highways Authority
- Length: 172 km (107 mi)
- Existed: 1981–present

Major junctions
- South end: Chitral
- North end: Shandur

Location
- Country: Pakistan
- Major cities: Barenis, Reshun, Parwak, Mastuj, Harshin

Highway system
- Roads in Pakistan

Chitral–Shandur Road (also known as Khyber Pakhtunkhwa Highway S-2) is a 172-kilometre-long (107 mi) provincial highway which extends from Chitral in Khyber Pakhtunkhwa province to Shandur in Gilgit-Baltistan province, Pakistan. Originally several separate roads, the Pakhtunkhwa Highways Authority merged them together to form one continuous road.

== Route ==
=== Chitral–Mastuj Road ===
The road starts from the town of Chitral and continues alongside the river (Chitral River) to the north pole. It crosses the old chew pul (chew bridge) and goes along with various number of villages of the lower chitral. These villages (small towns) include Denin, Moroi, Kari, Istangol, Baranis, Reshun, Zait, Kuragh, Charun, Junalikoch, Booni (across the river), Parwak, Mastuj. From Mastuj the road splits in to two. Continuing to the north pole will take to Yarkhun road which ends to the last valley of Broghil. While taking the south pole, it takes the travellers through the valley of Laspur starting from the village Harchin, gaht, Balim, Sor-Laspur and then Shandur Top (The pologround situated in the highest altitude). From Shandur the road continues to enter the valley of Gilgit Baltistan and the villages of Ghizer valley.

== See also ==
Provincial Highways of Khyber Pakhtunkhwa
