= Skardu (disambiguation) =

Skardu most commonly refers to a city in Pakistani–administered territory of Gilgit–Baltistan, in the disputed Kashmir.

Skardu may also refer to the following which are associated with the same territory:

== Geography ==
- Skardu District, one of the 14 districts of Gilgit–Baltistan
- Skardu Fort, a 16th-century fortress in Skardu city
- Skardu International Airport, an airport in Skardu city
- Skardu–Kargil Road, a currently closed road for access that crosses the Line of Control (LoC) and connects the Skardu city of Gilgit–Baltistan to Kargil city of Ladakh
- Skardu Road (S1), a highway linking cities of Gilgit and Skardu in Gilgit–Baltistan

=== Constituencies of Gilgit–Baltistan Assembly ===
- GBA-7 (Skardu-I)
- GBA-8 (Skardu-II)
- GBA-9 (Skardu-III)
- GBA-10 (Skardu-IV)

== See also ==
- Siege of Skardu – Siege during the First Kashmir War of 1947
