= Terkha =

Human settlement in Pakistan

Terkha is a small village situated in the district Nowshera of Khyber Pakhtunkhwa Province of Pakistan. It is about 5 km (3 mi) from the main Grand Trunk road and about 10 km (6 mi) from the Islamabad Peshawar Motorway.
