= Golain Valley =

Valley in Khyber Pakhtunkhwa

Golain, also known as Golen or Golan, is a valley located in Chitral of Khyber Pakhtunkhwa, Pakistan. It has a distance of 25 kilometers from Chitral city. It is located in Hindu Kush mountain range in northern Pakistan. It has an elevation of 7200 feet.

== Demographics ==
Main spoken languages in Golain Valley are Khowar and Urdu. Almost all people in the valley are Sunni Muslims. The literacy in Golain valley is 72%, with 40% for males and 32% for females.

== Villages ==
Golain valley has multiple villages, including:

- Istoor
- Birmogh
- Shamkan
- Izghoor
- Chashma
- Golain Payeen
- Bobhaka
- Dangari Koro
