= Harchin =

- Village and Union Council
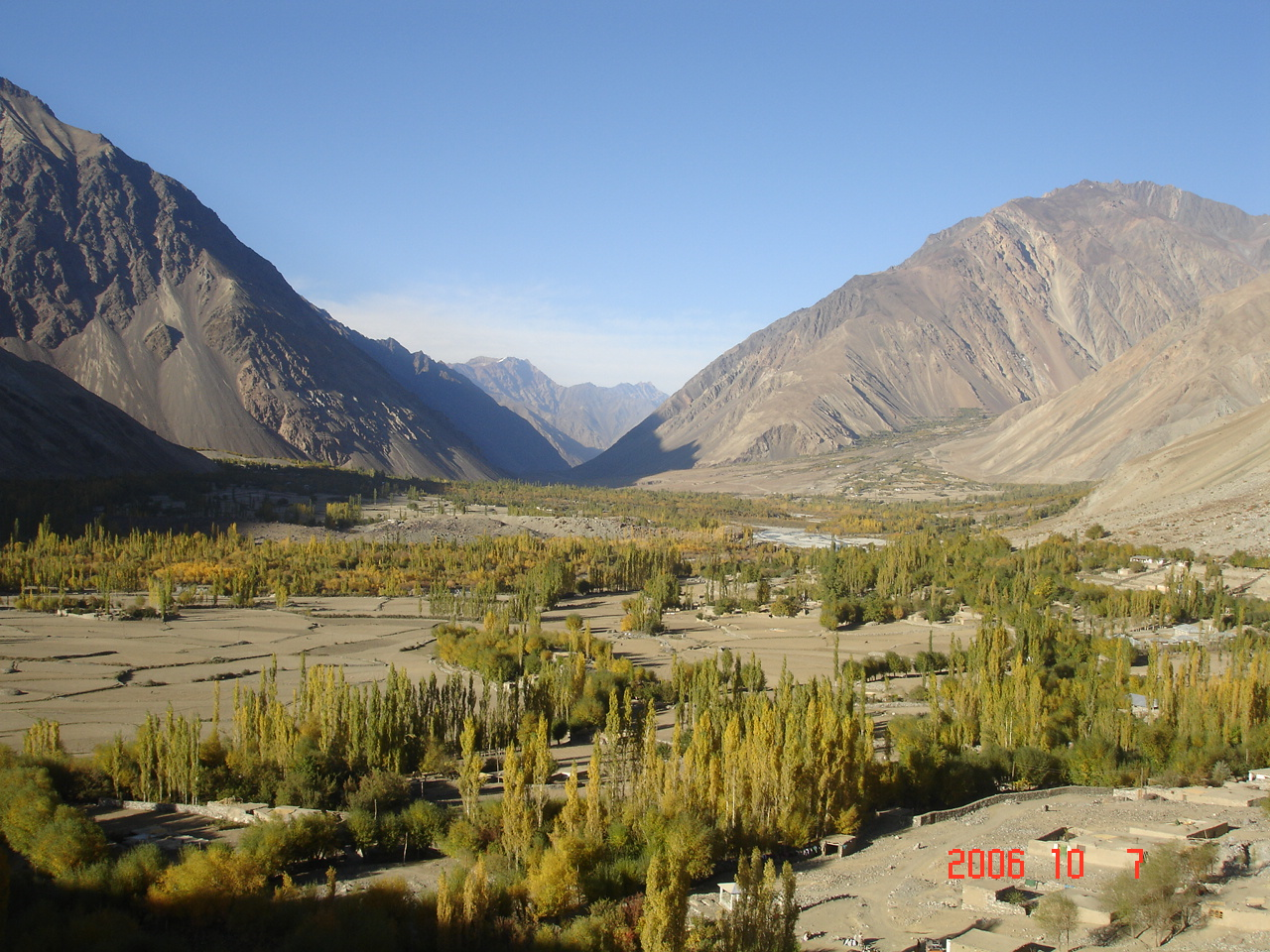
- Harchin, Laspur view

- Location within Pakistan
- Coordinates: 36°07′04″N 72°28′38″E
- Country: Pakistan
- State: Khyber Pakhtunkhwa
- District: Upper Chitral
- Established: 14 August 1947

Area
  - Total: 26 km^{2} (10 sq mi)

Population (2003)
  - Total: 463
  - Density: 18/km^{2} (46/sq mi)

Languages
  - Official: Chitrali
- Time zone: UTC+5 (PST)
- Postal Index Number: 17030 – 0xx
- Telephone code: +924 – 7
- Website: chitral.gov.pk

Harchin is a village in Laspur, Upper Chitral District, Khyber Pakhtunkhwa province of Pakistan. In 1998 it had a population of 1,490.

== Climate ==
The prevailing climate is called a tundra climate. Even in the warmest month of the year the temperatures are very low. Köppen and Geiger classify this climate as ET. The mean yearly temperature recorded in Harchin is -6.6 °C | 20.2 °F, as per the available data. The annual rainfall is 773 mm | 30.4 inch.

== Educational institutions ==
- Govt Higher Secondary School Harchin, Chitral

== See also ==
- Laspur
- Orghoch
- Gahirat
