= M-1 motorway (Pakistan) =

Motorway in Pakistan connecting Islamabad and Peshawar

M-1 motorway
- ایم ١ موٹروے
- Islamabad–Peshawar Motorway اسلام آباد - پشاور موٹروے

Route information
- Part of AH1 AH4
- Maintained by National Highway Authority
- Length: 155 km (96 mi)
- Existed: 2007–present

Major junctions
- West end: PRR Peshawar
- Kernal Sher Khan Interchange; Hazara Interchange; Burhan Interchange; Hakla Interchange
- East end: Islamabad–Rawalpindi

Location
- Country: Pakistan

Highway system
- Roads in Pakistan
→ M-2

The M-1 motorway or the Islamabad–Peshawar Motorway (Urdu: اسلام آباد - پشاور موٹروے) is an east–west motorway in Pakistan, connecting Peshawar to Islamabad–Rawalpindi.

The motorway was constructed during President Pervez Musharraf's rule at a cost of Rs. 13 billion (equivalent to US$332 million in 2025), and was opened in October 2007. It spans 155 km (96 mi), with 88 km (55 mi) in Khyber Pakhtunkhwa and 67 km (42 mi) in Punjab. National Highways & Motorway Police is responsible for maintaining law & order on M-1 motorway.

== History ==
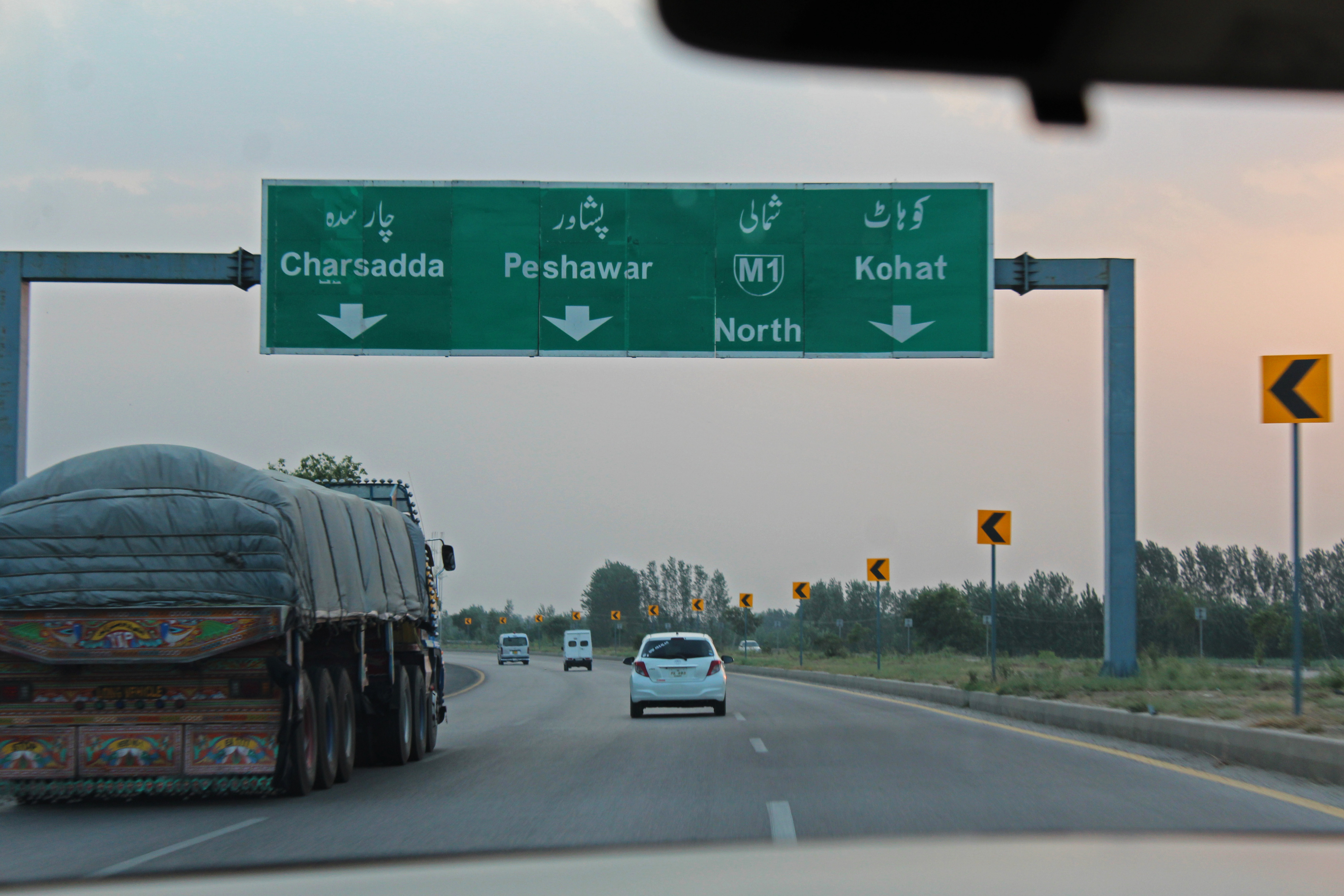
M-1 motorway westbound towards Peshawar.

Work on M-1 was started during Nawaz Sharif's tenure in 1997, and the contract was initially awarded to Turkish company Bayindir. The preliminary and detailed design was done primarily by the Pakistani consultant group ECIL by this time. However, the work stopped after his government was dismissed by Army Chief Pervez Musharraf in October 1999. Progress remained very slow and not much work was done between 1999 and 2003.

Work restarted in 2003 after the contract was re-awarded to a consortium PMC-JV (which concluded of a joint venture of domestic firms including SKB, ZKB, NLC, alongside several other domestic contractors with the FWO securing site operations) which had built and completed the M-1 during President Pervez Musharraf's tenure. The consultancy and design work was re-awarded to a joint venture named PMC (Pakistan Motorway Consultants) comprising ECIL, A.A Associates and Engineering Associates (EA) - all three of them being based in Pakistan. A plan was made to connect the existing M-2 motorway with the Torkham border. In 2004, the Senate body was briefed on a plan to connect Gwadar Port with the existing motorway infrastructure. Hence, it highlighted importance of M-1 motorway in this context.

It was completed at a cost of Rs. 13 billion, and was inaugurated by President Pervez Musharraf on 30 October 2007.

=== New Toll Plaza ===
In 2016, the old toll plaza in Srinagar Highway was demolished with a new toll plaza made. This toll plaza was still relatively small. But soon, another new, bigger toll plaza was made for M-1. The old toll plaza in Srinagar Highway was demolished due to high traffic and volume.

== Route ==
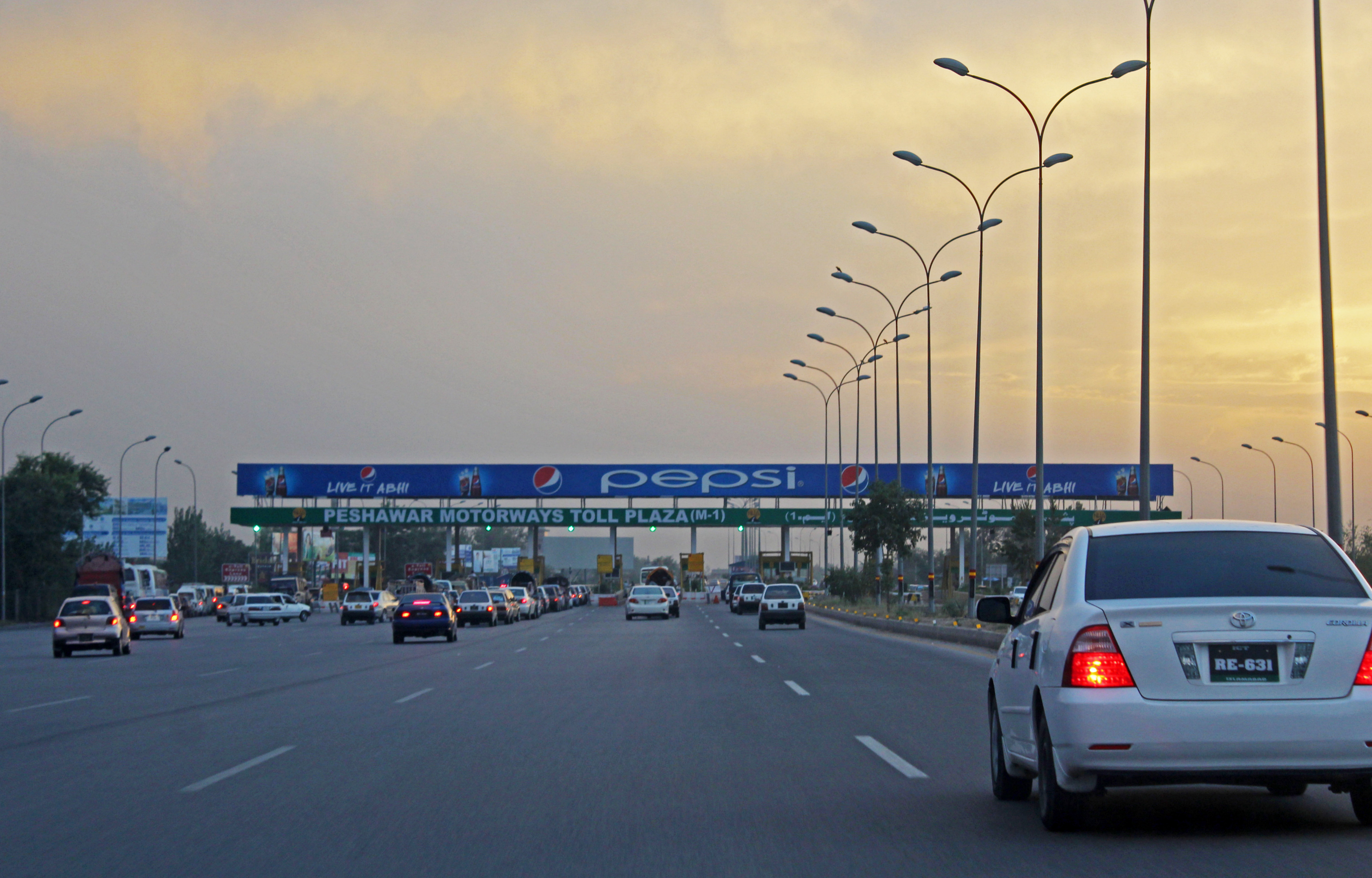
M-1 Peshawar toll plaza

The M-1 originates northeast of Peshawar at the junction with the Peshawar Ring Road. It then crosses over the Kabul River in an eastern direction passing the cities of Charsadda, Risalpur, Swabi, and Rashakai before crossing the Indus River. The M-1 leaves Khyber Pakhtunkhwa and enters into Punjab province after crossing the Indus River, where it passes through Attock, Burhan, and Hasan Abdal. The M-1 terminates near Islamabad as a continuation of the M-2 motorway.

The whole stretch of the M-1 consists of six lanes, with a number of rest stops along the route. The M-1 has 14 interchanges - at Airport Link Road, Islamabad, AWT/ Sanjiani/ Paswal, Burma Bhatar, Burhan (Hassan Abadal/ Kamra), Hazara Expressway (E-35), Ghazi, Chachh, Sawabi, Misri Banda, Rashakai, Charsadda, the Peshawar Northern Bypass and Peshawar Ring Road. At Brahma Bahtar Interchange, the Brahma Bahtar-Yarik Motorway leads towards Dera Ismail Khan.

There are three major bridges along the route along the Haro, Indus and Kabul rivers, 18 flyovers, 27 small bridges, 137 underpasses and 571 culverts. 10 service areas (five on the each side of the motorway) are present along the route. The route also travels over the Ghazi Barotha canal that provides water to the Ghazi-Barotha Hydropower Project.

== Junctions and interchanges ==
M-1 Motorway Junctions
West bound exits	Junction	East bound exits
Continues as Peshawar Ring Road
PRR Peshawar Ring Road		Start of motorway
to Peshawar-Charsadda Road	Peshawar Northern Bypass	to Chamkiani & N-5 National Highway
to Charsadda & KP Highway S-1	KP Highway S-9	to Nowshera
to Mardan, Rashakai & N-95 National Highway	N-45 National Highway	to Risalpur
to Wali	Exit 5 - Wali	to Wali
to M-16	Exit 6 - M-16	to Chakdara
to Swabi, Topi	Exit 7 - Swabi	to Jehangira
to Chach	Exit 8 - Chach	to Chach
to Ghorghushti	Exit 9 - Ghazi	to Lawrencepur
to M-15	Exit 10 - M-15	to M-15
to Hasan Abdal & N-35 National Highway	Exit 11 - N-5	to Burhan, Attock
to Brahma Bahtar	Exit 12 - Brahma Bahtar	to Brahma Bahtar
to Sangjani	Exit 13 - AWT & Sangjani-Peswal	to Peswal
to M-14	Exit 14 - M-14	to M-14
to Taxila/Wah Cantt	Exit 15 - Fateh Jang	to Fateh Jang
to Rawalpindi, Islamabad	Exit 16 - Rawalpindi & Islamabad	to Islamabad International Airport
Continues as M-2

== See also ==
- Motorways of Pakistan
- National Highways of Pakistan
- Transport in Pakistan
- National Highway Authority
