= Charun, Chitral =

Coordinates: 36°13′38″N 72°11′10″E

Charun
- Union Council
- Interactive map of Charun
- Country: Pakistan
- Province: Khyber Pakhtunkhwa
- District: Upper Chitral
- Time zone: UTC+5 (PST)

Charun is an administrative unit, known as Union Council, of Upper Chitral District in the Khyber Pakhtunkhwa province of Pakistan.

Chitral is the largest district in the Khyber-Pakhtunkhwa province of Pakistan, covering an area of 14,850 km^{2} (5,730 sq mi). It is the northernmost district of Pakistan bordering Afghanistan. The district of Chitral is divided into two tehsils and 24 Union Councils.

- Chitral
- Mastuj

== See also ==
- Chitral District
