= Serian =

Serian may refer to:

- Serian, Haripur, a village in Haripur district, Pakistan
- Serian Division, a division in Sarawak, Malaysia
- Serian District, a district in Serian Division, Sarawak, Malaysia
- Serian (federal constituency), represented in the Dewan Rakyat, Malaysia
- Seri language, or Serian languages, of the Seri people of Sonora, Mexico

== See also ==
- Syrian (disambiguation)
