= Sardar Hussain =

Pakistani politician

Member of the Provincial Assembly of Khyber Pakhtunkhwa
- In office 23 April 2014 – 28 May 2018
- Constituency: Constituency PK-90 (Chitral-II)

Personal details
- Born: 5 May 1967 (age 59) Buni
- Party: Pakistan Peoples Party

Sardar Hussain is a Pakistani politician who had been a Member of the Provincial Assembly of Khyber Pakhtunkhwa, from April 2014 to May 2018.

== Early life and education ==
He was born on 5 May 1967 in Buni, Chitral District.

He has a degree in Master of Arts.

== Political career ==
He ran for the seat of the Provincial Assembly of Khyber Pakhtunkhwa as a candidate of Pakistan Peoples Party (PPP) from Constituency PK-90 Chitral-II in the 2013 Pakistani general election but was unsuccessful. He received 10,841 votes and lost the seat to Ghulam Muhammad, a candidate of All Pakistan Muslim League (APML).

He was elected to the Provincial Assembly of Khyber Pakhtunkhwa as a candidate of PPP from Constituency PK-90 Chitral-II in by-polls held in April 2014. He received 1,778 votes and defeated Ghulam Muhammad, a candidate of APML.
