= Charun-Oweer =

Village in Pakistan

Charun-Oweer is an isolated village 10 kilometers to the North of Charun in the Mastuj Tehsil of District Chitral District in Pakistan.

The village takes its name from Oweer Valley. It lies at about 7,500 feet (2,300 m) above sea level. Charun-Oweer is bordered by River Mastuj and Jeenal-Kouch to the north, Booni River to the northeast.

An ancient rock engraving of Buddhist scriptures including Brahmi text exists in Charun Village of upper Chitral.

== See also ==
- Charun, Chitral
