= Murder of Sana Yousaf =

2025 murder of Pakistani social media influencer

Sana Yousaf
- ثنا یوسف
- Born: 29 May 2008 (or 2007); Islamabad, Islamabad Capital Territory, Pakistan
- Died: 2 June 2025 (aged 17); G-13/1, Islamabad
- Cause of death: Gunshot
- Resting place: Chuinj, Upper Chitral, Khyber Pakhtunkhwa, Pakistan
- Known for: Social media influencer on Instagram, also active on TikTok
- Father: Syed Yusuf Hasan Shah

Sana Yousaf (born Syed Sana Yusuf Shah; (Note: Urdu: سید ثنا یوسف شاہ) 29 May 2007 – 2 June 2025) was a Pakistani social media personality, known for her content on Instagram. By mid-2025, she had half a million followers and had become especially popular among Pakistani youth.

Sana Yousaf used her social media presence to promote Chitrali culture and advocate for girls' education, often posting content that highlighted traditional clothing and the importance of female empowerment. According to her father, Syed Yusuf Hasan Shah (a social worker hailing from Upper Chitral), she aspired to pursue a career in medicine with the aim of serving the people of Pakistan.

Yousaf was known for spending the money she earned through social media and advertising to help underprivileged girls. According to her parents, she often gave the clothes she had received for branding purposes to underprivileged girls after the advertising had been completed. Sardar Qadeer, the lawyer involved in the case also claimed that Yousaf had begun supporting the expenses of underprivileged girls.

On 2 June 2025, she was fatally shot at her home in Sector G-13/1, Islamabad, Pakistan. At the time of her death, she was a second-year student and had just turned 17. The case received nationwide media attention and sparked widespread outrage on social media platforms.

== Death ==
Murder of Sana Yousaf
- Date: June 2, 2025
- Location: G-13/1 sector, Islamabad, Pakistan
- Target: Sana Yousaf
- Perpetrator: Umar Hayat
- Charges: Murder
- Verdict: Guilty
- Sentence: Death; 21 years' imprisonment (concurrent); Rs 500,000 and Rs 2.5 million in compensation

On 2 June 2025, a 22-year-old man named Umar Hayat reportedly entered Sana Yousaf's residence in the G-13/1 sector of Islamabad, armed with a pistol, and after a confrontation, fatally shot her twice in the chest.

At the time, her father was away from home and her younger brother was in Chitral. Yousaf's paternal aunt, who was present in the house at the time of the incident, initially mistook the sound of gunfire for a balloon popping due to the muffled noise. Hayat then attempted to shoot her as well, but the gun failed to discharge, after which he fled the scene. Her mother was also present at the scene and was reportedly calling for help for Sana following the shooting. Later, some neighbours helped place Sana into a car, but she succumbed to her injuries before she could be taken for medical treatment. After her death was confirmed, her body was taken to the Pakistan Institute of Medical Sciences, where an autopsy was conducted. She was buried in her ancestral village, Chuinj in Upper Chitral.

Hayat was arrested in Faisalabad shortly after the incident. During interrogation, he confessed to murdering Sana. Authorities said his motive for the murder was that she had rejected his "offers of friendship" and his attempts to meet her, but her family said she had never mentioned him or talked about noticing any threatening behaviour. Hayat was transferred to Adiala Jail on a 14-day physical remand to facilitate an identification parade. The court directed that the identification process be completed and a report submitted by 18 June 2025. On 13 June 2025, Sana Yousaf’s mother and aunt identified Hayat during an identification parade conducted at Adiala Jail. On 20 June 2025, a local court in Islamabad extended his physical remand by three more days, adjourning the case until 23 June. On 23 June 2025, the court ordered that he was remanded to jail on judicial remand, noting that further police custody was no longer required. These are selected developments in the case and do not represent a complete timeline of proceedings. Hayat was indicted on 20 September 2025 and denied the charges. He had earlier confessed before a magistrate under Section 164 of the Code of Criminal Procedure, but later retracted the statement while testifying before the trial court. On 19 May 2026, an Islamabad sessions court convicted Hayat and sentenced him to death. Additional District and Sessions Judge Muhammad Afzal Majoka also sentenced him to a total of 21 years’ rigorous imprisonment under Sections 392, 449 and 411 of the Pakistan Penal Code (PPC), with a cumulative fine of Rs 500,000. All prison sentences were ordered to run concurrently.

On 8 July 2025, the Senate Functional Committee on Human Rights took up the murder case of Sana Yousaf and the Swat incident. The session was also attended by Sana Yousaf’s parents and their lawyer, Sardar Qadeer, who had been specially invited, as well as Senator Falak Naz.

The convict's death sentence appeal is scheduled to be heard by the Islamabad High Court on 23 November 2026.

=== Reaction ===
The murder of Sana Yousaf sparked widespread outrage across Pakistan and attracted international media coverage. On social media, users expressed grief, anger, and called for justice, while the incident reignited discussions about violence against women and the safety of public figures in digital spaces.

On 5 June 2025, Aurat March Islamabad organised a protest outside the National Press Club to demand justice for Sana Yousaf. The demonstration attracted a diverse group of participants, including students, working women, domestic workers, and other concerned citizens. Protesters carried banners with slogans such as "Saying No is My Right" and "Those who kill in the name of honour are the greatest dishonourable", emphasising women's rights and condemning gender-based violence. The protest called for the government, police, and judiciary to take immediate and strict action against the accused and to implement measures to protect women and deter similar crimes in the future.

== Verdict ==
On 19 May 2026, an Islamabad sessions court sentenced Umar Hayat to death under Section 302(b) of the Pakistan Penal Code for the murder of Sana Yousaf. The verdict was announced by Additional District and Sessions Judge Muhammad Afzal Majoka. Sardar Qadeer, counsel for Sana Yousaf's family, represented the victim's family during the proceedings. The court also sentenced Hayat to 10 years' rigorous imprisonment under Section 392 (robbery), another 10 years under Section 449 (house-trespass), and one year under Section 411 (dishonestly receiving stolen property). All prison sentences were ordered to run concurrently. The death sentence was subject to confirmation by the Islamabad High Court.

== See also ==
- Arfa Karim
- Iqbal Masih
- Murder of Noor Mukadam
