= El-Gadarif =

El-Gadarif القضارف
- City
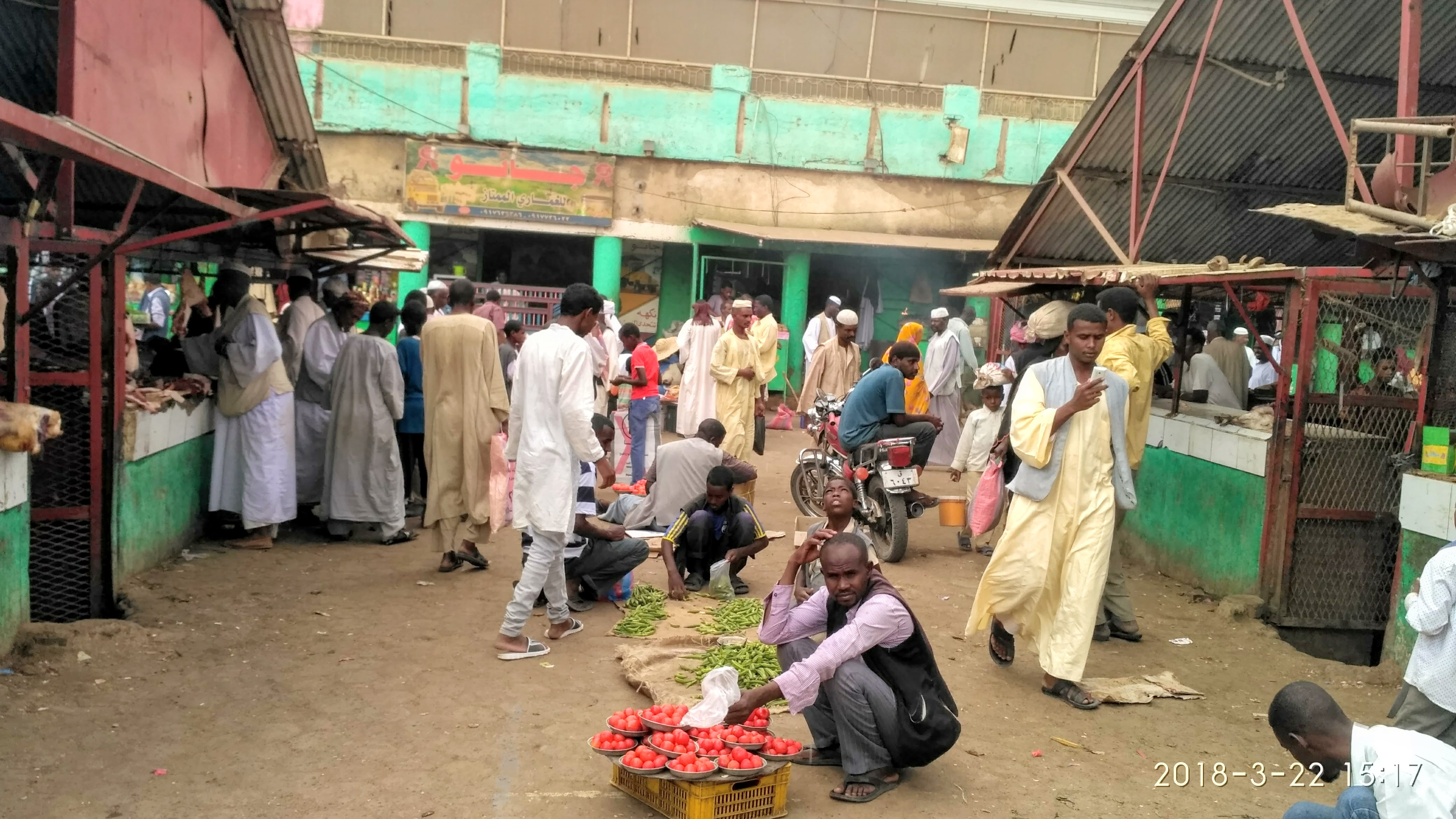
- Vegetable market

- Location within Sudan
- Coordinates: 14°02′N 35°23′E
- Country: Sudan
- Region: Eastern Sudan States Coordinating Council
- State: Al Qadarif (state)
- Elevation: 634 m (2,080 ft)

Population
  - City: 363,945
  - Urban: 379,419
  - Metro: 410,422
- Time zone: UTC+2 (CAT)

El-Gadarif (Arabic: القضارف Al Qaḍārif), also spelt Gedaref or Gedarif, is the capital of the state of Al Qadarif in Sudan. It lies on the road that connects Khartoum with Gallabat on the Ethiopian border, about 410 kilometres (250 mi) from the capital.

== Overview ==
El-Gadarif is surrounded by mountains on three sides. The city represents an excellent example of the intermingled ethnicities of central Sudan. Recently, a university has been established there. The main feature of the city is the grain silo built by the Russians to store sorghum. The town is famous for its daily sesame seed auctions.

== Name ==
The word Gedaref is derived from the Arabic phrase (Alli qada-Ye-rif) (Arabic القضا يرف), meaning 'He who has finished selling or buying should leave'. The phrase was later developed into 'Al-Gadarif'. The story of the name begins when Arab nomad tribes roaming the Butana plains in East-central Sudan chose the place where the city is built as a market place called Suq Abu Sinn (the Market of Abu Sinn), where the nomads exchanged their commercial commodities with the indigenous people. When the sun set, a herald used to call 'AIli Qada-ye-rif ... Alli qada-ye-rif', asking every one who had finished his dealing in the market to leave so that the market could be closed on time.

Another theory is that the town was named for the range of hills surrounding the area which looks like cartilage. Yet there is confusion in the spelling of the word in Arabic, because "cartilage" in Arabic is written as Ghadarif (Arabic غضارف) not Qadarif (Arabic قضارف), the spelling of the town name.

== History ==
Al-Gada-ye-rif market place developed into a village; then into a town with its dwellers cultivating its fertile soil with sorghum, sesame, peanuts and vegetables. Its green plains during the rainy seasons attracted many nomad herds and peasants from neighbouring areas.

According to Holt and Daly, the Shukriya, who were camel-owning nomads and the leading tribe of the southern Butana, were living and ruling the grain-producing rain lands of Gadarif or Qadarif, where a tribal market developed. This place, originally called Suq Abu Sinn (Abu Sinn's Market) took the name Qadarif, anglicized as Gedaref.

The Scottish explorer James Bruce (who called the town Teawa) passed through al Qadarif in 1772. He recorded that its sheikh, Fidele, was a vassal of the Kingdom of Sennar. Today, Teawa or Twawa is the name of a hill in the western part of the city. The British explorer Samuel Baker stopped in this town in November 1862. He mentioned in his book The Nile Tributaries Of Abyssinia that it lay on the trade route between Khartoum and Kassala, and described at length its twice-weekly market.

During the Turkiyah (Egyptian rule), Gedaref became an administrative unit with a strong military garrison. The Mahdist forces preserved this status when they occupied the town in 1884 during the Mahdist Revolt, using it as a base to conquer other places in the area and in neighbouring Ethiopia.

Sir Gawain Bell, who worked in the Sudan in 1931 to 1945 as Assistant Inspector for Gedaref, referred to Gedaref in his book (Shadows on the sand), as a town with more African appearance than Arab, because of its hut houses (locally called quttiyya) made of wood, reeds and grass. Its population was more than fifteen thousand, a mixture of Arab tribes and peoples from Nigeria, Eritrea and Abyssinia.

In September 1898 a British battalion led by Lieutenant-Colonel Parsons moved from Kassala toward Gedaref and clashed with a Mahdist Dervishes army composed of 3,500 men under the command of the Mahdist Emir Sa'ad-Allah in a jungle located between the River Atbara and Gedaref town. The fighting was fierce, but the forces of Parsons managed finally to defeat the Mahdist Dervishes. In the town a small garrison was left consisting of 200 soldiers led by the Mahdi Emir Nur Angara. The Mahdist Dervishes who fought bravely realized their defeat and retreated to the west of the city. Most of the defeated army was composed of soldiers from the Darfur and Kordofan regions of western Sudan. They had no choice except to settle their status with the British to stay and live with their families in the western part of Gedaref, which later became the basis of the Mayoral Bakr, whose influence extends to the frontier town of Gallabat on the Sudanese-Ethiopian border.

During the Second World War, Gedaref became very important for the Condominium of Anglo-Egyptian Sudan, by providing food (mainly grain and oil seeds) to the armies of the Allies in East Africa. After the war the town became also more attractive for agricultural investment to many segments of Sudanese tribes, especially after the establishment of the Mechanized Farming Corporation in 1968.

== Geography ==
=== Topography, flora and fauna ===
The geographical feature of the city is marked by a group of hills surrounding it and small khors (tiny dry valley creeks). The largest is called Khor Maqadim, which runs from the southeast part of the city between Deim El Nur and Deim Suakin districts to the northwestern part of the city in Deim Bakr District. Its course overflows during the fall season, when heavy rain falls in the highland areas along the Ethiopian border.

The climate of Gedaref is hot and rainy in the summer. The rainy season extends four months, with an average of annual rainfall of 700 to 900 mm. In the autumn during the rainy seasons, or Kharief (Arabic الخريف) as it is locally called, large pools of water and green meadows with trees of various kinds of acacia cover the area. The early advent of the flamingo flock, or the Simber (Arabic السمبر) as it is locally called, gives the sign of the beginning of the Kharif.

=== Climate ===
El-Gadarif has a hot semi-arid climate (Köppen climate classification BSh), characterized by hot temperatures and distinct wet and dry seasons. The period from March to May is particularly hot, with high temperatures routinely exceeding 40 °C (104 °F). The wet season occurs mainly from June to September. The months from October to May constitute the dry season, with minimal or no precipitation from November to March.

Climate data for El-Gadarif (1991–2020)
Month	Jan	Feb	Mar	Apr	May	Jun	Jul	Aug	Sep	Oct	Nov	Dec	Year
Record high °C (°F)	41.5 (106.7)	44.2 (111.6)	46.2 (115.2)	47.5 (117.5)	46.5 (115.7)	47.0 (116.6)	42.5 (108.5)	39.9 (103.8)	40.3 (104.5)	41.6 (106.9)	41.5 (106.7)	40.7 (105.3)	47.5 (117.5)
Mean daily maximum °C (°F)	35.2 (95.4)	37.6 (99.7)	40.1 (104.2)	42.3 (108.1)	41.4 (106.5)	38.5 (101.3)	34.3 (93.7)	32.6 (90.7)	34.5 (94.1)	37.0 (98.6)	37.7 (99.9)	36.0 (96.8)	37.3 (99.1)
Daily mean °C (°F)	26.6 (79.9)	28.6 (83.5)	31.2 (88.2)	33.8 (92.8)	33.8 (92.8)	31.3 (88.3)	28.3 (82.9)	27.1 (80.8)	28.4 (83.1)	30.0 (86.0)	29.9 (85.8)	27.7 (81.9)	29.7 (85.5)
Mean daily minimum °C (°F)	17.9 (64.2)	19.6 (67.3)	22.2 (72.0)	25.4 (77.7)	26.2 (79.2)	24.1 (75.4)	22.3 (72.1)	21.6 (70.9)	22.3 (72.1)	23.0 (73.4)	22.1 (71.8)	19.5 (67.1)	22.2 (72.0)
Record low °C (°F)	9.2 (48.6)	7.6 (45.7)	12.2 (54.0)	13.2 (55.8)	18.0 (64.4)	17.7 (63.9)	17.0 (62.6)	17.0 (62.6)	16.7 (62.1)	17.0 (62.6)	13.5 (56.3)	8.9 (48.0)	7.6 (45.7)
Average precipitation mm (inches)	0.0 (0.0)	0.0 (0.0)	1.9 (0.07)	6.5 (0.26)	32.5 (1.28)	71.7 (2.82)	172.9 (6.81)	218.9 (8.62)	88.2 (3.47)	25.7 (1.01)	0.4 (0.02)	0.0 (0.0)	618.6 (24.35)
Average precipitation days (≥ 1.0 mm)	0.0	0.0	0.3	1.1	4.1	7.1	11.9	13.8	7.1	3.3	0.2	0.0	48.8
Average relative humidity (%)	33	27	22	22	34	49	65	72	66	52	33	34	42
Mean monthly sunshine hours	291.4	263.2	291.4	291.0	285.2	267.0	232.5	229.4	255.0	269.7	273.0	288.3	3,237.1
Source: NOAA

== Administration ==
The city is administratively and socially divided into Diems (ديم) or districts. The famous Deims are Deim Bakr, Deim El Nur, Diem Al Khama, Abakar Jibriel, Al- midan, Deim Abbas, Deim Saukin, Al Matar, Deim Sa'ad, Deim Hamad, Janayin, Abbayo, Nasr, Selamt El-Bey, Al Israa, Al Malik, A Nadher, Al Tadamun, Al Danagla, Al Jumhouriya, Al Mufaqaat, Al Syool, Al Mourada, Barnu, Badr, Marco, Al Rabaa, Ruwina, Addona, Taradona, Karfis, Al Kababish, Karrari, Al Mahrouga, Al Sufi, Al Muwazafien, Army Barracks and Police Barracks.

Greater Gedaref includes many rural districts and villages such as Um Shagara, Al- Faw, Wad addida, Sabouniya, Koum Shitta, Um sawani, Um Sunaebra, Id Altin, Kassab, Al Samina, Shasheina, Al Hwata, An Nahal, Al Houri, AlMatna, and Al Shuwak.

In 1994 Gedaref became the capital of Al-Qadarif State which includes Gedaref city, Faw, Gallabat, and Fashaga areas.

== Economy ==
Gedaref is a trade centre for cotton, cereals, sesame seeds, and fodder produced in the surrounding areas, and it is a well-known agriculture area where a mechanized farming scheme has been introduced since 1954. About 70% of the total mechanized farming in the Sudan is carried out in Gedaref. The aim of the mechanized farming is to develop the areas socially and economically. Many large and endless individual fields grew suddenly and have scattered over the whole area surrounding Gedarif such as Um-seinat, Al-Ghadambliya, making use of the fertile soil and abundant rainfall (avg. 700 to 900 mm/year), and relatively obtainable manpower.

The River Gash Irrigation Scheme is located to the northeast of Al-Qaḍārif, while the Rahad Scheme and the famous Gezira Scheme lie to the west. With the cultivation of sesame seed, sunflower, cotton, peanuts and cereals, especially sorghum, Gedaref has become the country's granary. Thus, if Sudan could be the granary of Africa and the Middle East, Gedaref is the breadbasket of the Sudan.

Light industries in the city include cotton ginning and spinning mills and soap factories.

== Transportation and communication ==
The city is served by a station on the national railway network. It is linked with the capital Khartoum via Wad Medani city by a net of roads, railway, airway, and seasonal direct roads. It is also linked to Port Sudan city with roads and railway through Kassala at a distance of about 200 km. There are also roads to the Gallabat at the edge of the boundary with Ethiopia connecting Gedarif with the Ethiopian city of Gonder, and from there to the Ethiopian capital Addis Abeba. The city has also an airport called Azaza Airport (IATA: GSU , ICAO: HSGF ).

The Gedaref State Broadcasting was established in 1995 with a frequency of 1485 kHz. A television station was followed in 1996 with a range of 50 km.

== The Gedaref Digital City ==
Gedaref is distinguished also by its digital city, directed by the Gedaref Digital City Organization (GDCO) which is a non-governmental and non-profit organization, founded in 2005 in partnership between Gedaref city and Eindhoven community in the Netherlands. The initiative was taken by Dr.Agnes Ovington of Eindhoven Municipality, Gedaref Public Organization for Water and Development. GDCO, is part of the Telecentres Movement where ICT is used for community development. It won many international awards. It is the winner of information for development award i4d 2007 (e-India 2007) for the inclusion of the disabled, the winner of i4d 2008 awards for the best innovations at the grassroots Telecentres, and the winner of i4d 2009 for the initiatives of civil society for development (e-Agriculture project and other e-services).

== Population ==
The population of the city is mainly Arab or Nuba Sudanese. It includes the indigenous Beja people. The total population is 269,395 (as of 2008).

Inhabitants origins in Gedaref have rapidly changed during the last decades. Dwellers who belong to various nationalities had settled in the area along with the indigenous people. Today the mosaic of population includes many Sudanese tribes from different regions as far as Dar Fur, Kordofan, southern and northern Sudan. Tribes like Shaigiya, Baggara, Dinka, Fur, Nuba, Masalit, Shukriya, Beja, Hausa people, Songhay people and many other Sudanese tribes are represented in Gedaref. No other city in the Sudan, with exception of Khartoum and Port Sudan has so many dwellers of Foreign origin among its population, as Gedaref. Kurds, Armenians, Panian of India, Greeks, Egyptian Copts, Ethiopians, Eritrean, Somalis, Chadians, Yemenis, Italians has been Sudanized since generations and well integrated in the Gedaref community. The main reason for this gathering of foreign and local groups of people in Gedaref can be attributed to the Agricultural boom that swept the city and turned it to a major centre of trade in the area.

== Education ==
Education in Gedaref has been far developed in the last decades. The city counts about 73 schools of different levels. With the establishment of Al Qadarif University the city has accomplished its dream to become an education shrine for the whole area of southeast Sudan. Boarding schools has been established in the city as early as the 1960s to accommodate young villagers and rural areas youth.

Among the famous children of the city are Rashid Bakr (former Vice President 1983) and Ahmed Al Jabri (singer).

== Tourism ==
There are seven hotels.

== Twin towns — sister cities ==
Gedaref is twinned with: Eindhoven, the Netherlands, and Konya, Turkey.
