= Azaza Airport =

Airport in Sudan

- IATA: GSU; ICAO: HSGF

Summary
- Airport type: Public
- Serves: Gedaref
- Elevation AMSL: 1,640 ft / 500 m
- Coordinates: 14°07′50″N 35°18′25″E

Map
- Location of the airport in Sudan

Runways
| Direction | Length | | Surface |
| Direction | ft | m | Surface |
|---|---|---|---|
| 05/23 | 3,480 | 1,060 | Dirt |
- Source: Google Maps

Azaza Airport (IATA: GSU, ICAO: HSGF) is an airstrip serving the town of Gedaref in Sudan. Remains of a 3,000 metres (9,800 ft) north/south grass runway are evident, but look in unusable condition.

== See also ==
- Transport in Sudan
