= Kuragh, Khyber Pakhtunkhwa =

Village in Khyber Pakhtunkhwa, Pakistan

Kuragh
- Village
- Location within Khyber Pakhtunkhwa Location within Pakistan
- Coordinates: 36.219411°N 72.159964°E
- Country: Pakistan
- Province: Khyber Pakhtunkhwa
- District: Chitral
- Time zone: UTC+5 (PST)

Kuragh is a village located in Chitral district of Khyber Pakhtunkhwa, falls in Mastuj tehsil.

== History ==
The narrow passageways in the mountains near Kuragh witnessed battles between local warriors under Sher Afzal Khan and British troops in late 19th century.

== Terrain ==
Kuragh is situated on Kunar River which is also known as Mastuj River or Chitral River. The river here is a narrow gorge. The village is located at the confluence of Mastuj and Mulkhow valleys.

== Demographics ==
There are about 250 households in Kuragh belonging to Sunni and Ismaili communities. Farming is a key sector of economy here. The other important industry is tourism.

== Landmarks, facilities and development efforts ==
Kuragh has government and Aga Khan schools. The village has a shrine of Qalandar Shah, a saint. Kuragh also has a Chitral Scouts post. Chitral-Shandur Road project (a 153-km China-Pakistan Economic Corridor project) was inaugurated by the then prime minister Imran Khan in 2021 to boost trade and tourism, with Kuragh as one of the villages on the way. However, the project was reportedly shelved in 2023 leading to agitation.
