= Qaqlasht Meadows =

Plateau in Khyber Pakhtunkhwa, Pakistan

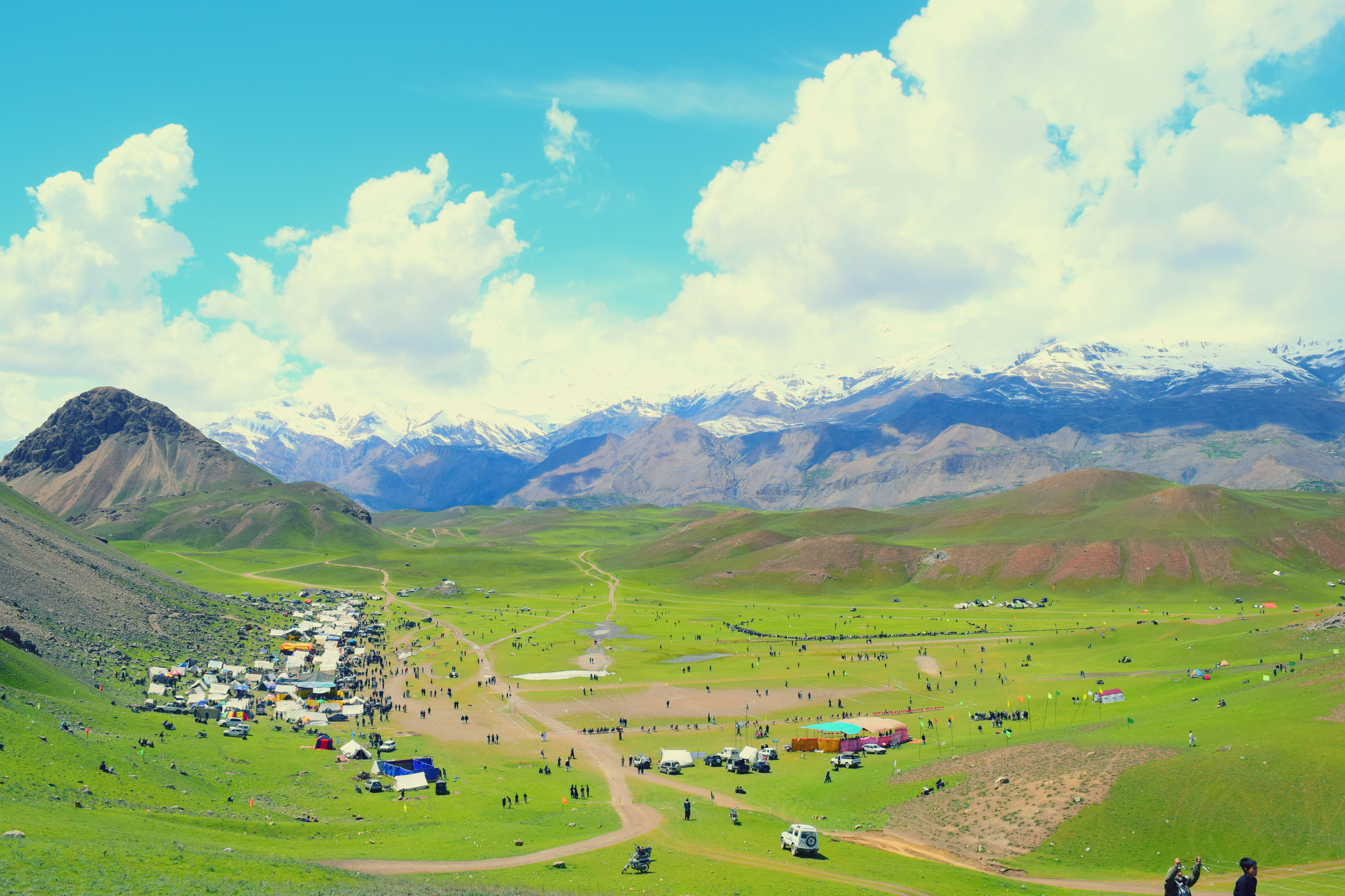
- A view of Qaqlasht meadows photographed c. 2016

- Location in Pakistan Qaqlasht Meadows (Pakistan)
- Coordinates: 36.2858°N 72.2337°E
- Country: Pakistan
- Province: Khyber Pakhtunkhwa
- District: Upper Chitral District
- Elevation: 2,500 m (8,200 ft)

Qāqlasht, also spelt Qāq Lasht (Khowar: قاقلشت; lit. 'Dry Plain') is an alpine meadow located near Buni in the Upper Chitral District in Khyber Pakhtunkhwa, Pakistan. The meadows are situated at an altitude of around 2,500 metres (8,200 ft).

== Festival ==
The four-day spring festival "Jashan-e-Qaqlasht" is held at the meadows annually. The history of festival celebrations dates back to 2,000 years ago. The festival, a major part of the Kho culture, was revived in 2003 after nearly 35 years, although it was put into a five-year hiatus in 2019–2024. The sport competitions include polo, archery, paragliding, cricket, football, hockey, skeet shooting and marathon race. Qaqlasht also hosts a winter sports festival from January 2–5, featuring winter camping, skiing and mountaineering training.

== Gallery ==
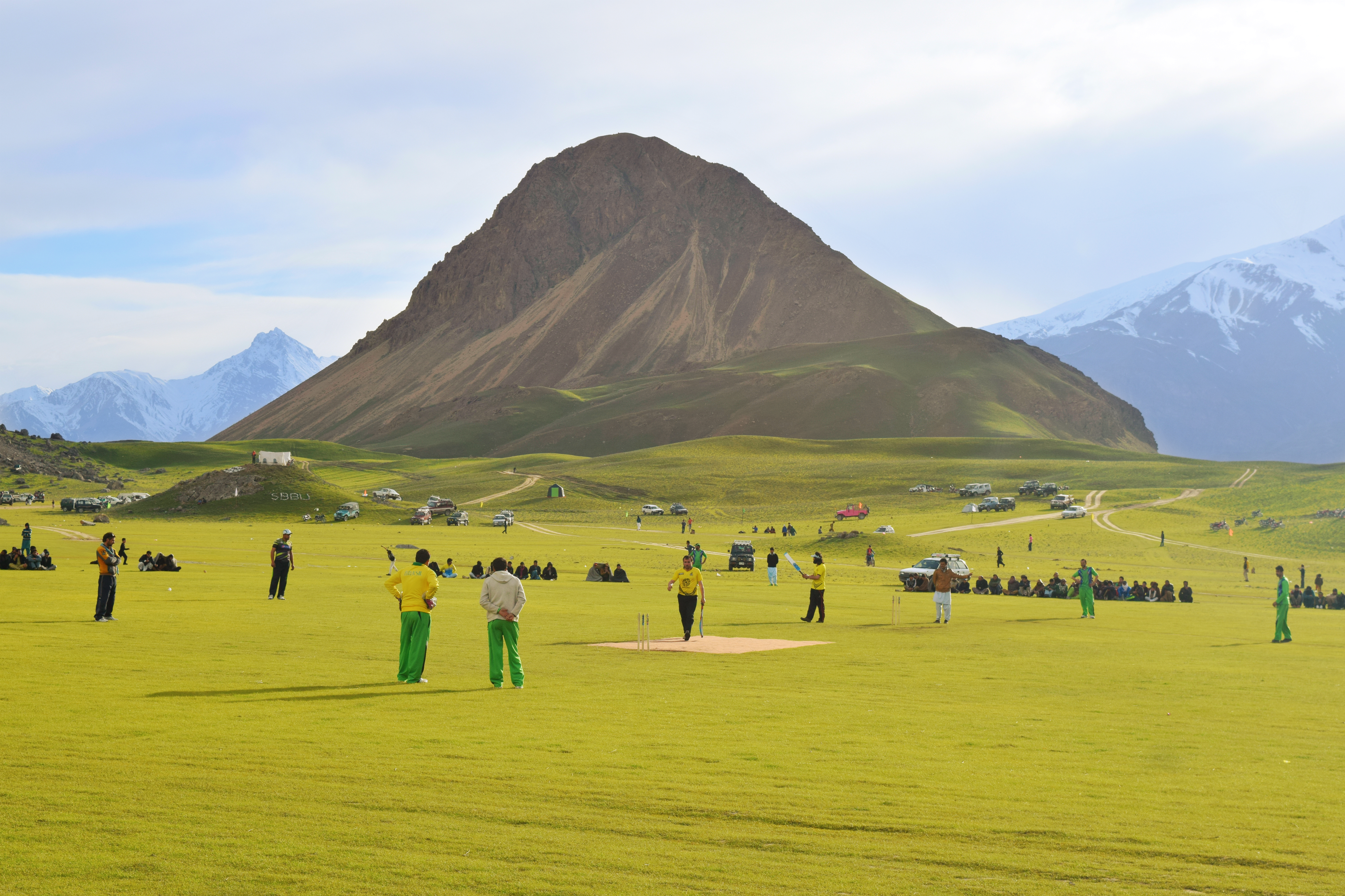
A view of a cricket match in the meadows.

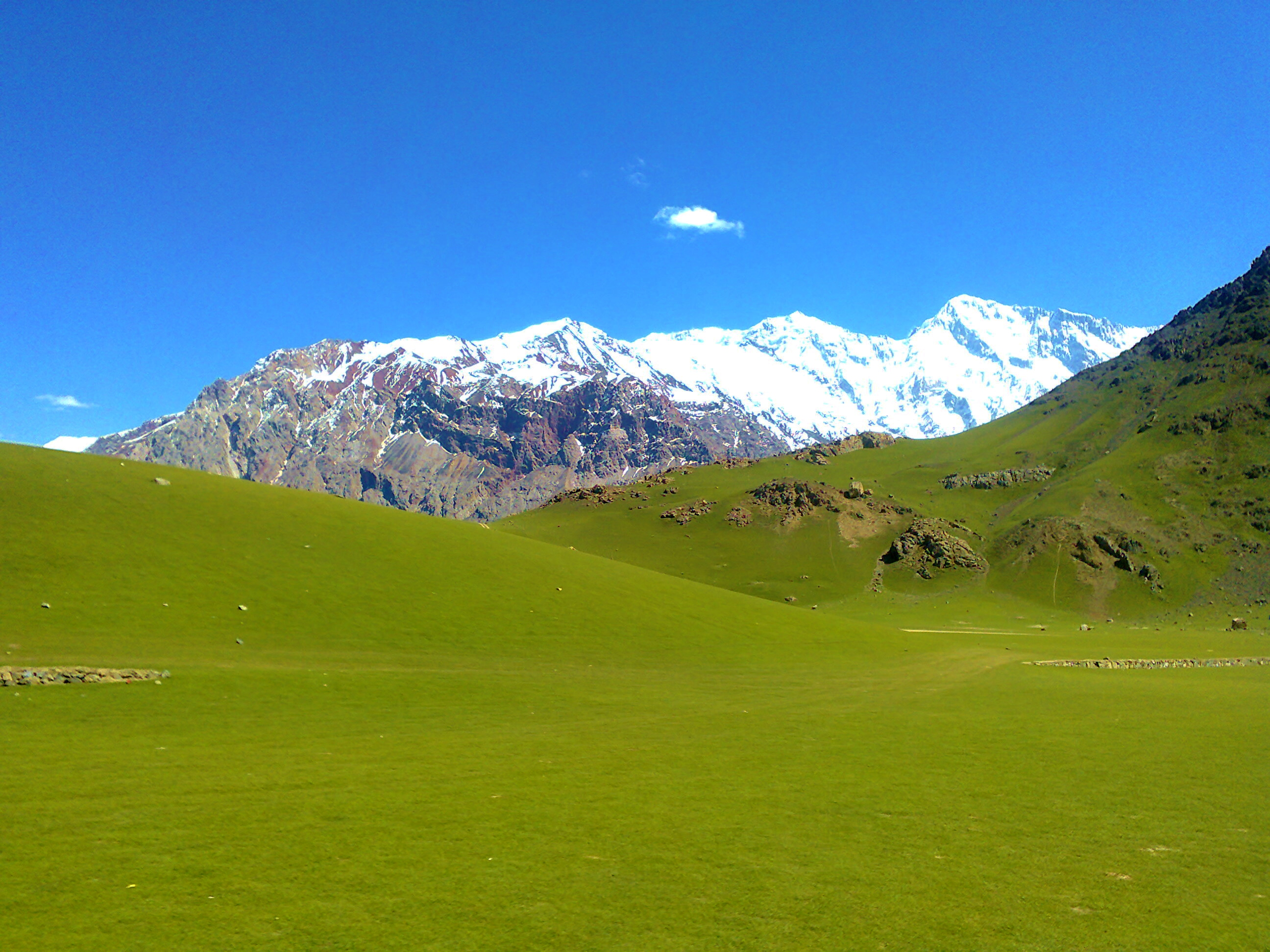
Qaqlasht meadows during a sunny day.

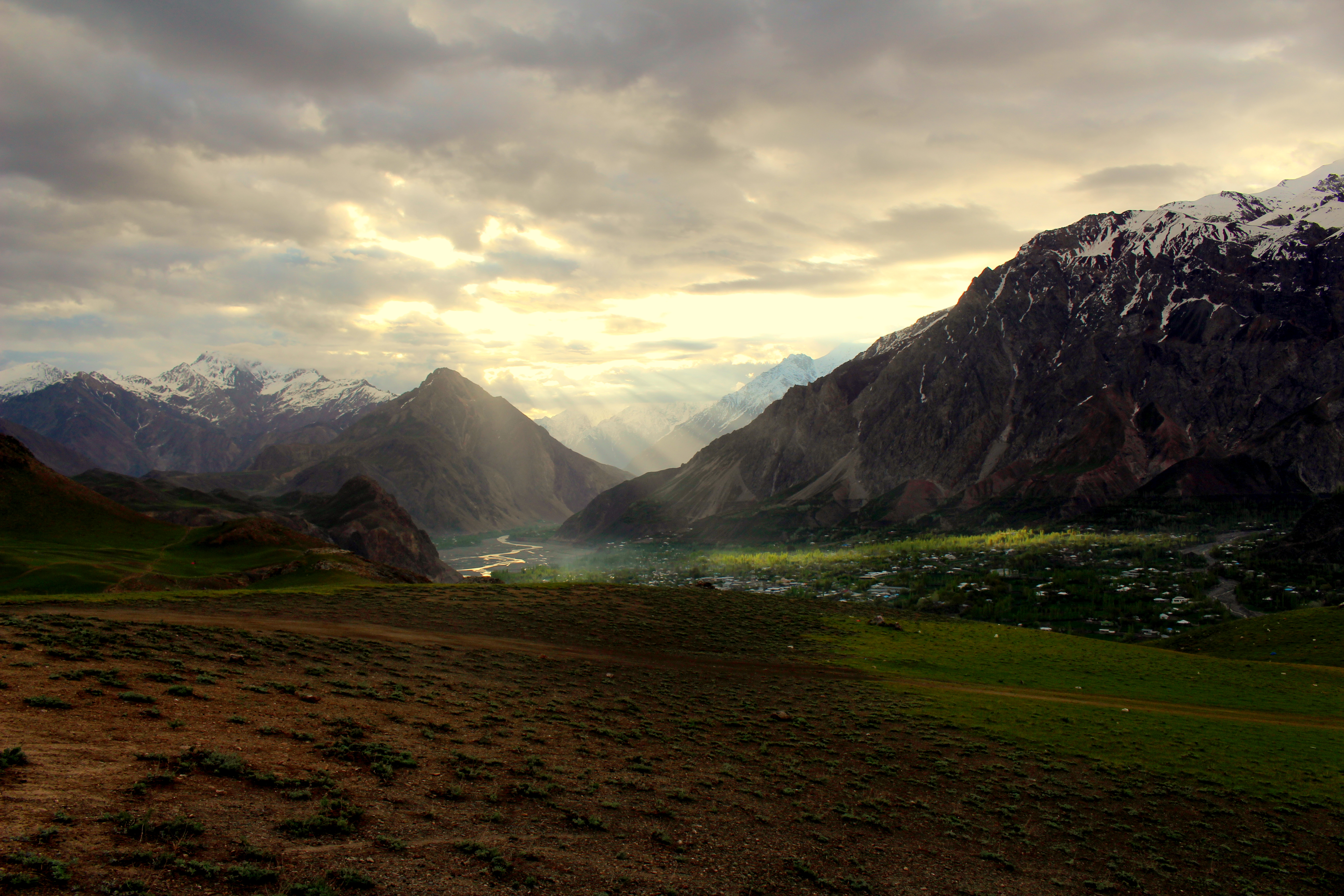
Qaqlasht meadows under clouds.

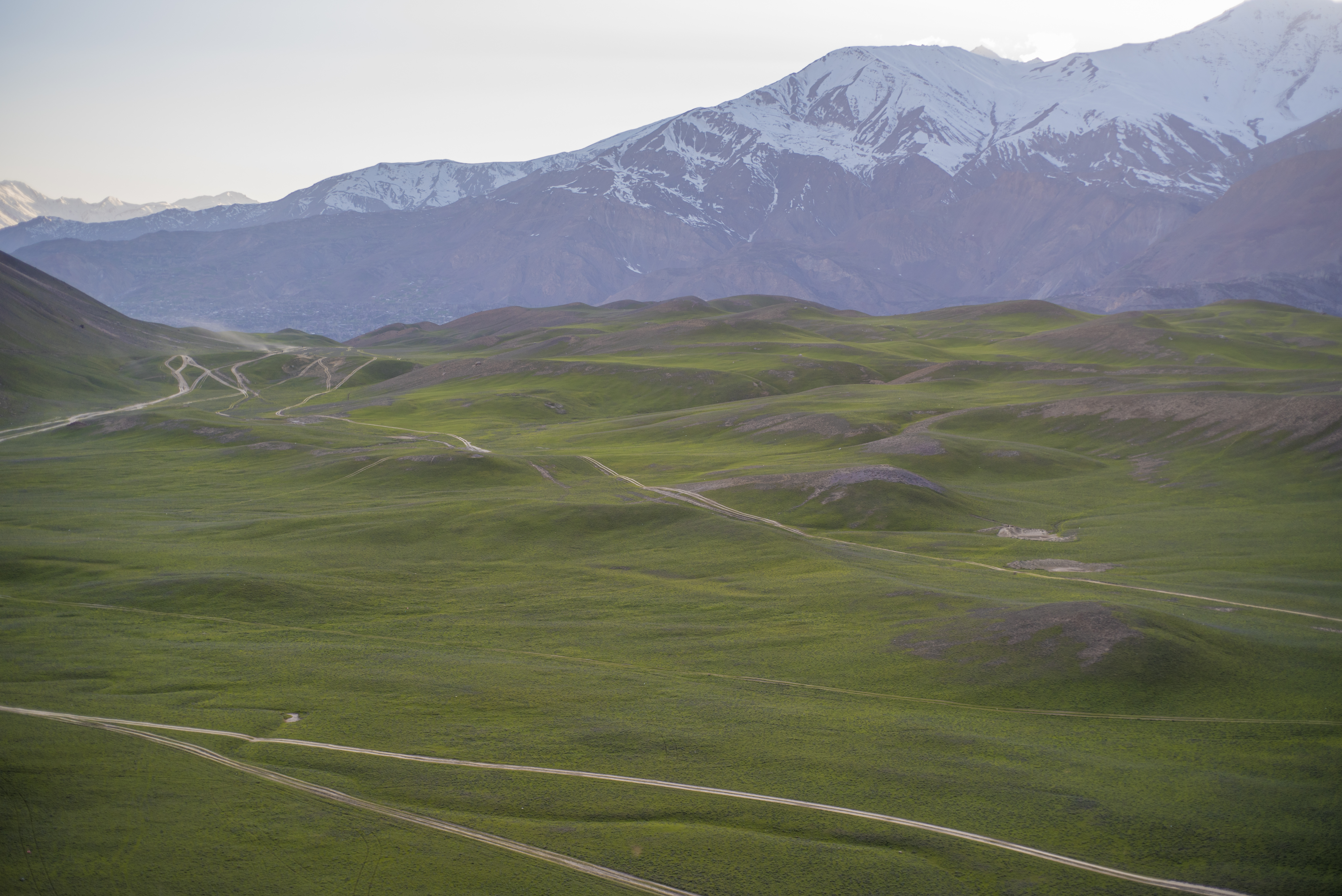
Traversing paths in the meadows.
