= Peshawar Northern Bypass =

Road in Pakistan

Major junctions
- From: Nasir Bagh
- M-1
- To: N-5 Chamkani

Location
- Country: Pakistan

Highway system
- Expressways of Pakistan

Peshawar Northern Bypass (Urdu: پشاور شمالی بائی پاس) or Northern Peshawar Highway is a grade separated dual carriageway with controlled-access, designed for high speeds vehicles and heavy traffic coming from southern Pakistan. The bypass has two traffic lanes and an emergency lane in each carriageway. It bypasses the Provincial capital Peshawar from north with the purpose to carry the transit traffic bound toward Afghanistan, which has to pass through the city or via the Peshawar ring road.

The bypass is an important thoroughfare, as it connects Indus Highway - N-55 (via Peshawar Ring Road), Khyber Agency and Mohmand Agency with Peshawar- Islamabad M1 motorway (Pakistan).

== See also ==
- Motorways of Pakistan
- National Highways of Pakistan
- Transport in Pakistan
- National Highway Authority
