= Mastuj Fort =

Building in Khyber Pakhtunkhwa, Pakistan

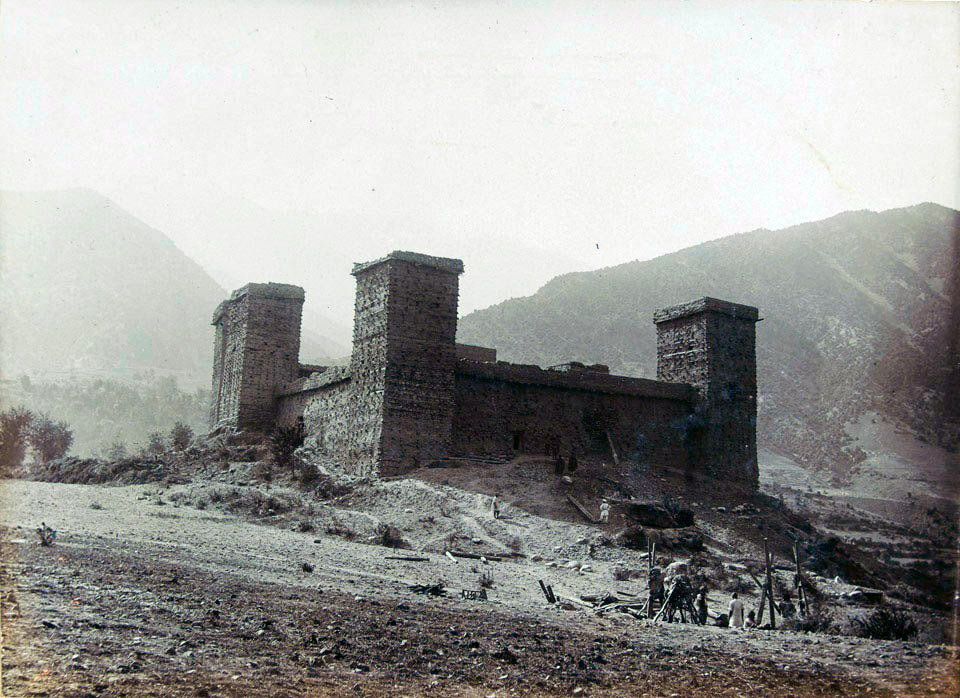
- Interactive map of the Mastuj Fort area

General information
- Location: Mastuj, Khyber Pakhtunkhwa, Pakistan, Pakistan
- Coordinates: 36.2848°N 72.5242°E

The Mastuj Fort is a fortification in Mastuj city, Khyber Pakhtunkhwa, Pakistan. The fort is situated on a plateau at a confluence of the Yarkhun River and the Mastuj River near Shandur Pass.

The fort is believed to have been built by the Katoor Dynasty around 1780, rebuilt in 1830 and rebuilt again in the 1920s.

== See also ==
- Chitral (princely state)
- Chitral Fort
