= Skardu–Kargil Road =

Road in the greater Kashmir region of South Asia

Skardu–Kargil Road شاہراہِ کارگل
- Kargil Highway

Route information
- Maintained by Planning & Development Department
- Length: 126 km (78 mi)
- Restrictions: Line of Control

Major junctions
- From: Skardu
- To: Kharmang

Location
- Country: Pakistan

Highway system
- Roads in Pakistan

The Skardu–Kargil Road (Urdu: شاہراہ کارگل) is a 126-kilometre (78 mi) provincial highway in the Pakistani-administered territory of Gilgit–Baltistan, running from the city of Skardu to the Line of Control with the Indian-administered territory of Ladakh, via the Kharmang Valley. The original road continued to run until the town of Kargil, but has been closed since 1948.

== History ==
Prior to First Kashmir War, the regions of Kargil, Leh and Baltistan constituted the Ladakh Wazarat in the princely state of Jammu and Kashmir in British India. Following the end of the First Kashmir War, Kargil and Baltistan came under the control of India and Pakistan respectively.

Many people from both sides of the Line of Control seek to have the road re-opened to traffic, partly on humanitarian grounds.

== See also ==
- Provincial highways of Gilgit–Baltistan
- Kashmir conflict
