= Taja Zai =

Coordinates: 32°41′42″N 70°46′25″E

- Union council and town
- Interactive map of Taja Zai
- Country: Pakistan
- Province: Khyber Pakhtunkhwa
- District: Lakki Marwat District
- Time zone: UTC+5 (PST)

Taja Zai is a town and union council of Lakki Marwat District in Khyber Pakhtunkhwa province of Pakistan. It is at 32°41'42N 70°46'25E and has an elevation of 274 metres (902 feet).
