= Chowga =

Village in Shangla District, Khyber Pakhtunkhwa, Pakistan

Chowga (Urdu: چوگا) is a village in Shangla District, Khyber Pakhtunkhwa, Pakistan.
