= Baghicha Dheri =

Baghicha Dheri باغچہ ڈھیری | Chota Wilayat
- Village and Union Council
- Interactive map of Baghicha Dheri
- Coordinates: 34°1′N 72°57′E
- Country: Pakistan
- Region: Khyber Pakhtunkhwa
- District: Mardan District
- Elevation: 514 m (1,686 ft)
- Time zone: UTC+5 (PST)

Baghicha Dheri (باغیچہ ڈھیری) also known as Chota Wilayat is a village and union council of Mardan district in the Khyber Pakhtunkhwa province of Pakistan. It is the biggest village of Dheri union council wherein Taju Khel, Jadoon, Wali Khel Miangan, Mulan, Alizai Durrani, Awan, Dilzak, KakaKhel, Aku Khel, Uttmanzai, Lal Khel, Baghwanan, Behzad Khel, Kulalan, Juhlagan tribes live.

It is located at 34°1'N 72°57'E at an altitude of 514 metres (1689 feet).
