= Khouzh =

Khouzh Khozh
- village
- Khouzh
- Location within Pakistan
- Coordinates: 36°23′N 72°36′E
- Country: Pakistan
- Province: Khyber Pakhtunkhwa
- Time zone: UTC+5 (PST)

Khouzh (pronounced as khoxh in the local language) is a village located in Upper Chitral, a district in the Khyber Pakhtunkhwa province of Pakistan. The village is situated between the Koh Hindukush and Hindu Raj mountain ranges, with the Chitral River flowing along its borders. Khouzh is home to a diverse community of people who speak the local language of Khowar. Khouzh is located 130 km from Chitral town.It has surface elevation of 2408 meters.

== Population and people ==
Around 2000 people live in the village. The people speak the Chitrali language. The inhabitants settled there many centuries ago. Four major tribes live in the village: Khoshwaqt, Qaziye, Masholaye, Sheghniye, Syed, Apart from these tribes, a few people had migrated from Afghanistan, Mongolia, Molkhow, Pashk,
