= Peshawar Ring Road =

Orbital highway in Pakistan

Highway S–13
- Peshawar Ring Road پشاور مداری سڑک د پېښور حلقوي سړک

Route information
- Maintained by Peshawar Development Authority
- Length: 43 km (27 mi)

Major junctions
- Ring road around Peshawar
- Peshawar-Charsadda Road; M-1 Motorway Interchange; N-5 National Highway Interchange; N-55 National Highway Interchange

Location
- Country: Pakistan

Highway system
- Roads in Pakistan

Peshawar Ring Road (Urdu: پشاور مداری سڑک, Pashto: د پېښور حلقوي سړک, also known officially as Khyber Pakhtunkhwa Highway 13) is a 35-kilometre-long (22 mi) orbital highway located in Peshawar, Khyber Pakhtunkhwa province, Pakistan.

== Route ==
The ring road serves as a bypass for heavy transport vehicles and facilitates Afghanistan-bound traffic. It also serves as the terminus for the Peshawar-Charsadda Road, Peshawar-Bara Road, Peshawar-Dalazak Road and Jamrud-Warsak Road.

=== Reconstruction ===
At a ceremony in Peshawar on 27 April 2010, United States Ambassador to Pakistan Anne W. Patterson joined President Asif Ali Zardari, Khyber Pakhtunkhwa Governor Owais Ahmed Ghani, and Khyber Pakhtunkhwa Chief Minister Amir Haider Khan Hoti in inaugurating the 25 kilometres (16 mi) Peshawar Southern Bypass (Southern Ring Road). The U.S.-financed project provided Rs. 2.1 billion (US$7.3 million) in upgrades to the road. The US Ambassador stated the road would provide ease traffic between Charsadda and Hayatabad, improve security, and generate greater trade opportunities for the citizens of Khyber Pakhtunkhwa and the Federally Administered Tribal Areas,".

== Expansion ==
The Peshawar Ring Road's northern section was completed in 2018 from Bacha khan Markaz to warsak road which also included 2 underpasses . In 2026, it is further extended towards Nasir Bagh road and Hayatabad, passing through Paloski and Regi villages.

== See also ==
Provincial Highways of Khyber Pakhtunkhwa
