= Dassu, Gilgit–Baltistan =

Pakistani town in Baltistan

Dassu داسو
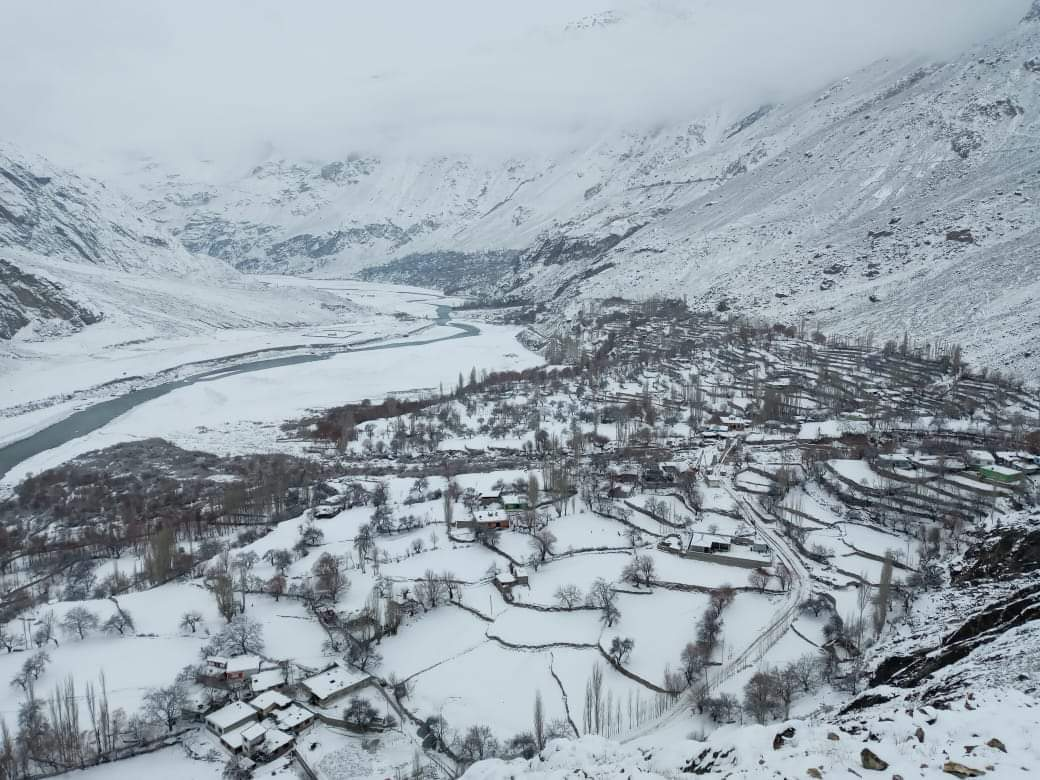
- Winter Picture of Dasso in the Shigar Valley

- Location within Gilgit Baltistan Location within Pakistan
- Coordinates: 35°43′N 75°31′E
- Country: Pakistan
- Province: Gilgit-Baltistan
- District: Shigar
- Elevation: 2,440 m (8,010 ft)
- Time zone: UTC+5 (PST)

Dassu (Balti / Urdu: داسو), also spelt Dasu or Dusso, is a town in Shigar, Baltistan, Pakistan.

== Geography ==
It is located at 35°43'0N 75°31'0E' and has an altitude of 2440 metres (8008 feet).
