= Mastuj Tehsil =

Administrative sub-division in Pakistan

Mastuj Tehsil تحصیل مستوج
- Tehsil
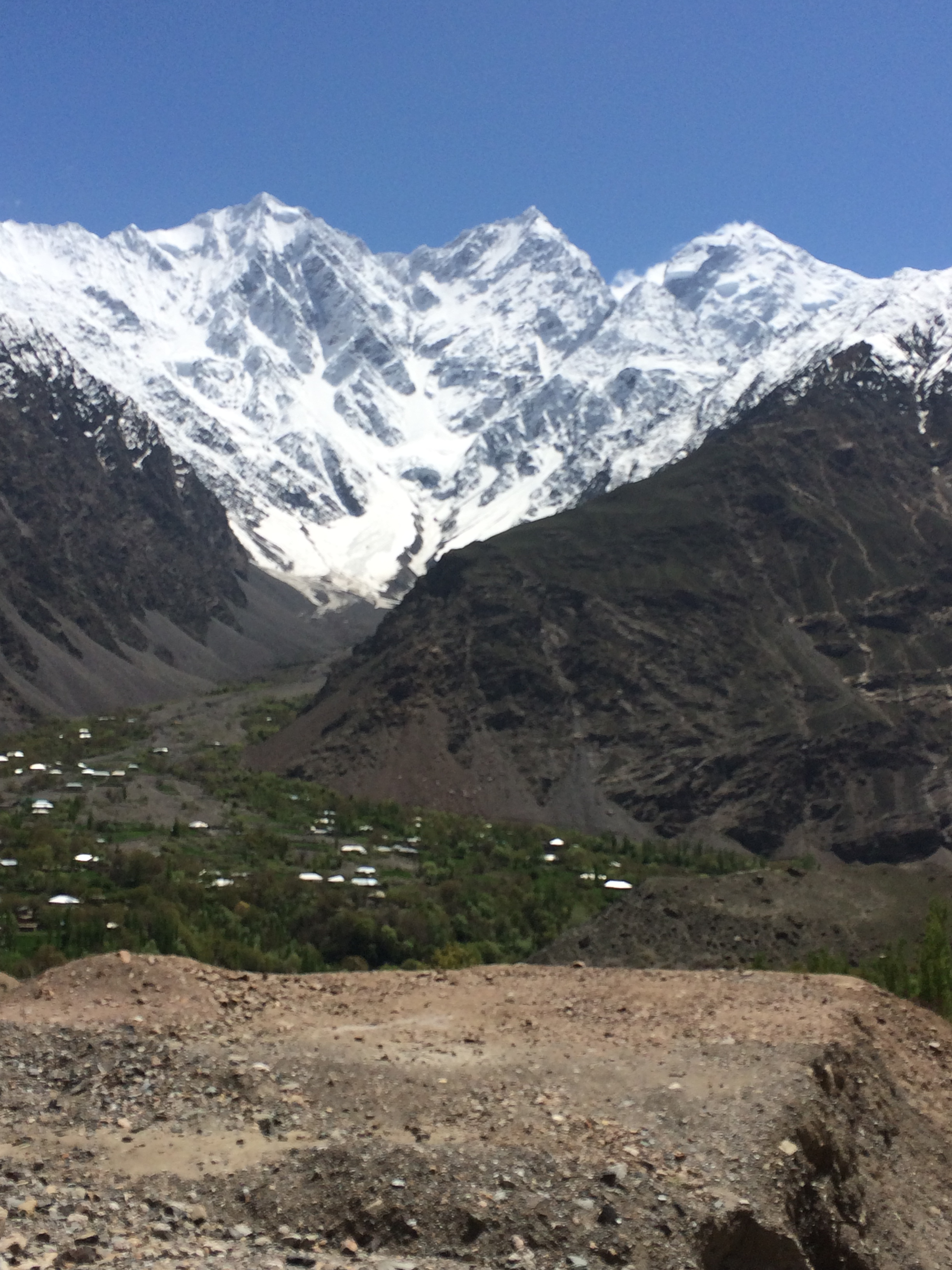

- Location within Khyber Pakhtunkhwa Location within Pakistan
- Coordinates: 36°17′0″N 72°31′0″E
- Country: Pakistan
- Province: Khyber Pakhtunkhwa
- District: Upper Chitral
- Headquarter: Mastuj
- Elevation: 2,359 m (7,740 ft)

Population (2017)
  - Total: 169,240
- Time zone: UTC+5 (PST)
- Postal Index Number: 1710 - 0xx
- Website: www.mastuj.gov.pk

Mastuj (Urdu: مستوج) is a tehsil and a valley in Upper Chitral District in Khyber Pakhtunkhwa province of Pakistan. Mastuj is the principal settlement. It is located at 36°17'0N 72°31'0E with an altitude of 2359 metres (7742 feet). There are ruins of old fort built originally in 18th century and reconstructed several times.

== Geography ==
=== Adjacent administrative units ===
- Wakhan District, Badakhshan Province, Afghanistan (north)
- Ishkoman Tehsil, Ghizer District, Gilgit-Baltistan (northeast)
- Yasin Tehsil, Ghizer District, Gilgit-Baltistan (east)
- Gupis Tehsil, Ghizer District, Gilgit-Baltistan (southeast)
- Behrain Tehsil, Upper Swat District (southeast)
- Sharingal Tehsil, Upper Dir District (southwest)
- Chitral Tehsil (southwest)

== Villages ==
The main villages include Buni, Charun-Oweer, Mastuj, Khouzh, Kargin, Marthing, Chuinj, Parkusap, Reshun, Parwak, Kuragh, Aveer, Chapali and Brep.

Mastuj Tehsil starts right after the end of Baranis, Reshun, Kuragh, Buni, Aveer, Parwak, Mastuj, Chinar, Chuinj, Chapali, Brep, Bang and Meragram are the main areas of Tehsil Mastuj.

== See also ==
- Asadabad District

Media related to Mastuj tehsil at Wikimedia Commons
