= Pakhtunkhwa Highways Authority =

Pakhtunkhwa Highways Authority پختونخوا شاہراہ اختیار
- Abbreviation: PKHA
- Formation: 2001
- Legal status: Active
- Headquarters: Peshawar, Pakistan
- Region served: Pakistan
- Official language: Urdu; Pashto; English
- Website: pkha.gov.pk

The Pakhtunkhwa Highway Authority (Urdu: پختونخوا شاہراہ اختیار, Pashto: د پښتونخوا لويې لارې واک) constructs and maintains the provincial highways in the Khyber Pakhtunkhwa province of Pakistan. It was previously known as Frontier Highways Authority and was established on August 29, 2001.

== See also ==
- Provincial Highways of Khyber Pakhtunkhwa
- National Highways of Pakistan
- Motorways of Pakistan
- Transport in Pakistan
