= Serian, Haripur =

Village in Pakistan

Coordinates: 33°58′N 73°04′E

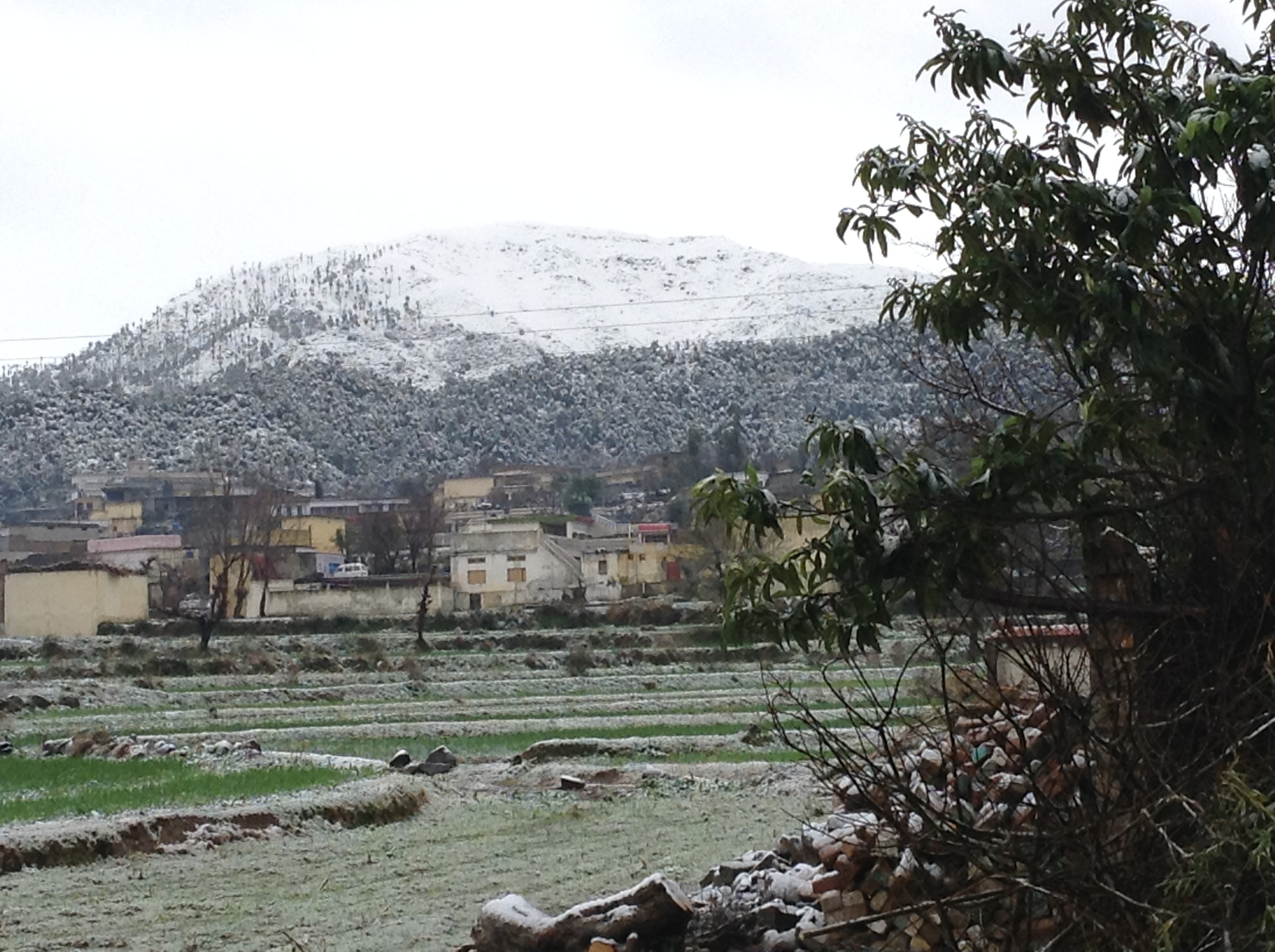

Serian is a village in Haripur District in the Khyber Pakhtunkhwa province of Pakistan, located at 34°23'60N 72°58'60E.

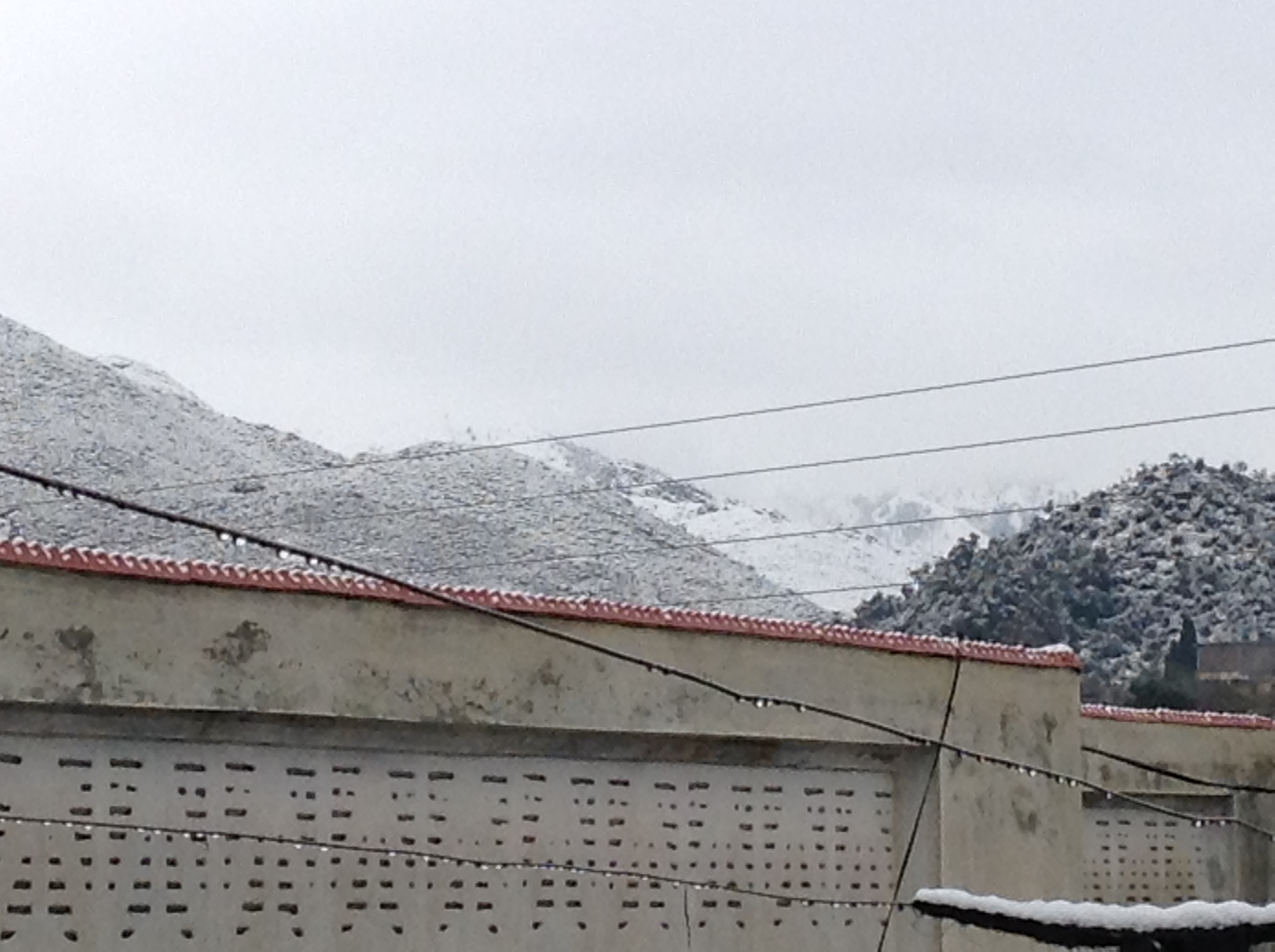
snow fall
