= Panian =

- Town and union council
- Country: Pakistan
- Region: Khyber Pakhtunkhwa
- District: Haripur District
- Established: 30 May 2015

Government
  - Type: Local Government
  - District Councilor: Prof. Imran Khan
  - Chairman: Prof. Imran Khan
- Elevation: 471 m (1,545 ft)

Population (2019)
  - Total: 20,000+
- Time zone: UTC+5 (PST)
- Zip Code: 22690
- Area code: 0995

Panian is one of the 44 union councils, administrative subdivisions, of Haripur District in the Khyber Pakhtunkhwa province of Pakistan.

== Villages and areas in UC Panian ==
- Kangra Colony
- Kangra Village
- Ganaya
- Todo
- Abdullahpur/Mohra
- Paharo
