= Buni =

Pakistani town

Buni بونی Booni
- Town
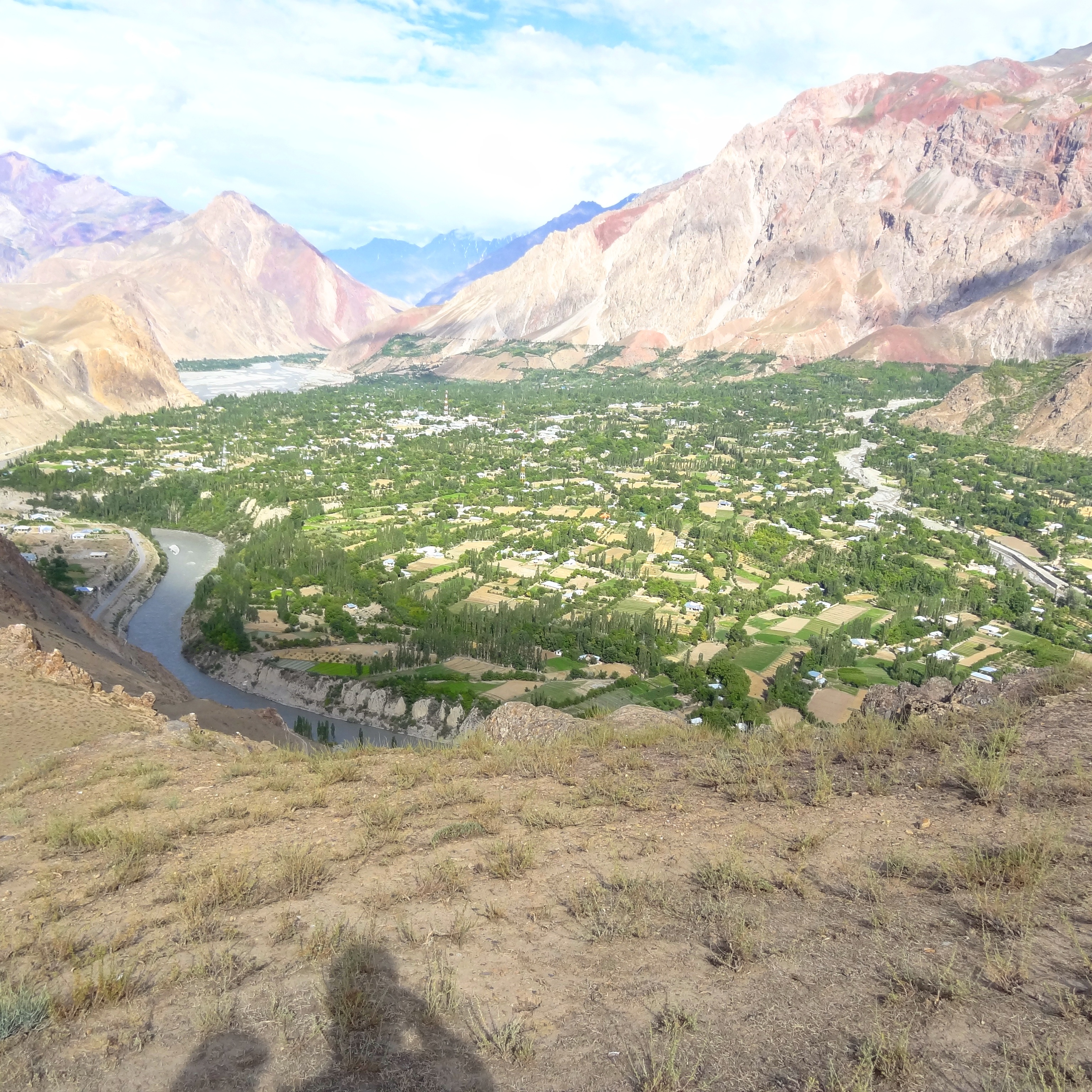
- Buni from above

- Location in Khyber Pakhtunkhwa, Pakistan Buni (Pakistan)
- Coordinates: 36°16′22″N 72°15′35″E
- Country: Pakistan
- Province: Khyber Pakhtunkhwa
- District: Upper Chitral
- Tehsil: Mastuj
- Established: 1885
- Founder: British government

Area
  - Total: 151.51 km^{2} (58.50 sq mi)
- Elevation: 2,085 m (6,841 ft)

Population (2023)
  - Total: 50,000
  - Density: 330/km^{2} (850/sq mi)
- Demonym: Boonegh

Languages
  - National: Urdu
  - Native: Khowar (Chitrali)
- Time zone: UTC+5 (PST)
- Postal Index Number: 17050 - 0xx
- Telephone code: +943 - 7

Buni (Khowar, Urdu: بونی; also spelled Booni) is a town and the headquarters of Upper Chitral District in Khyber Pakhtunkhwa, Pakistan. The 2,500 m (8,200 ft) high Qaqlasht Meadows, the site of a major festival in the region, are located near the town.

Lying near the foothills of the Buni Zom, Buni is near glacial lakes, due to which the town has faced floodings various times. Through the glacial melting followed by heavy monsoon rainfalls, the region was severely affected by the floods during August 2024.

== Demography ==
The residents of Buni are primarily Kho people (also known as Chitralis), who speak Khowar, a language widely spoken and understood throughout the Chitral region. Urdu, the national language of Pakistan, is also commonly spoken and understood. The population comprises both Ismaili and Sunni Muslims.

== Climate ==
The climate is considered to be a local Mediterranean climate. During the year, there is abundant rainfall. This climate is considered to be Csa to the Köppen-Geiger climate classification. The average annual temperature in Buni is 15.6 °C. About 418 mm of precipitation falls annually.

Climate data for Buni
Month	Jan	Feb	Mar	Apr	May	Jun	Jul	Aug	Sep	Oct	Nov	Dec	Year
Mean daily maximum °C (°F)	8.3 (46.9)	9.5 (49.1)	14.9 (58.8)	21.0 (69.8)	25.6 (78.1)	31.8 (89.2)	32.8 (91.0)	32.0 (89.6)	28.7 (83.7)	23.7 (74.7)	17.4 (63.3)	10.9 (51.6)	32.8 (91.0)
Daily mean °C (°F)	4.1 (39.4)	5.0 (41.0)	9.8 (49.6)	15.3 (59.5)	19.4 (66.9)	24.9 (76.8)	26.1 (79.0)	25.4 (77.7)	21.9 (71.4)	17.0 (62.6)	11.5 (52.7)	6.5 (43.7)	26.1 (79.0)
Mean daily minimum °C (°F)	−1.1 (30.0)	−0.6 (30.9)	4.8 (40.6)	9.7 (49.5)	13.3 (55.9)	18.0 (64.4)	19.5 (67.1)	18.8 (65.8)	15.2 (59.4)	10.3 (50.5)	5.6 (42.1)	2.1 (35.8)	11.4 (52.5)
Average precipitation mm (inches)	69 (2.7)	99 (3.9)	146 (5.7)	139 (5.5)	69 (2.7)	22 (0.9)	52 (2.0)	56 (2.2)	40 (1.6)	31 (1.2)	26 (1.0)	51 (2.0)	800 (31.4)
Source: Climate-Data.org

== See also ==
- Broghil Valley National Park
