= Upper Chitral District =

District in Pakistan

Upper Chitral District توری ݯھیترارو ضلع ضلع چترالِ بالا
- District
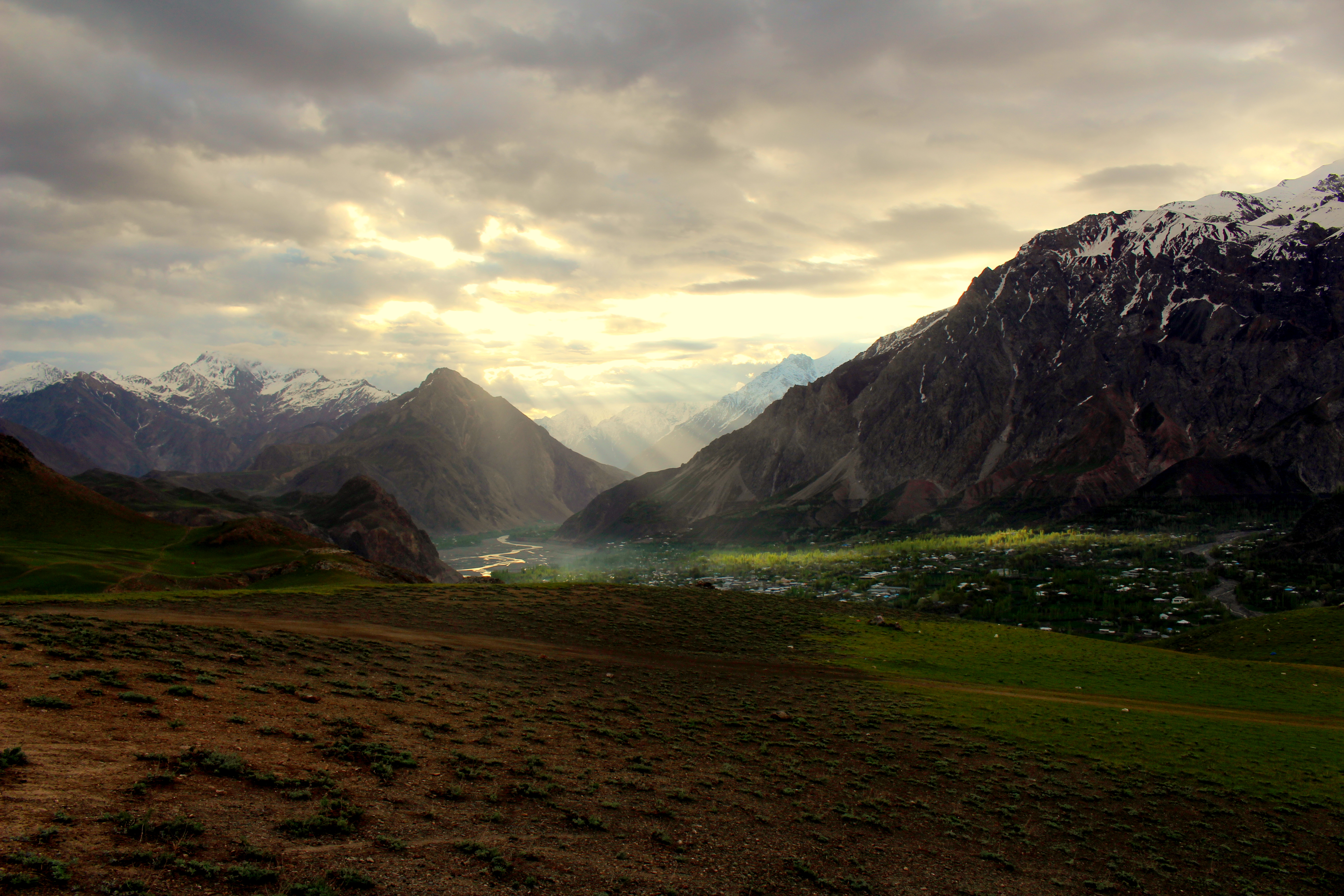
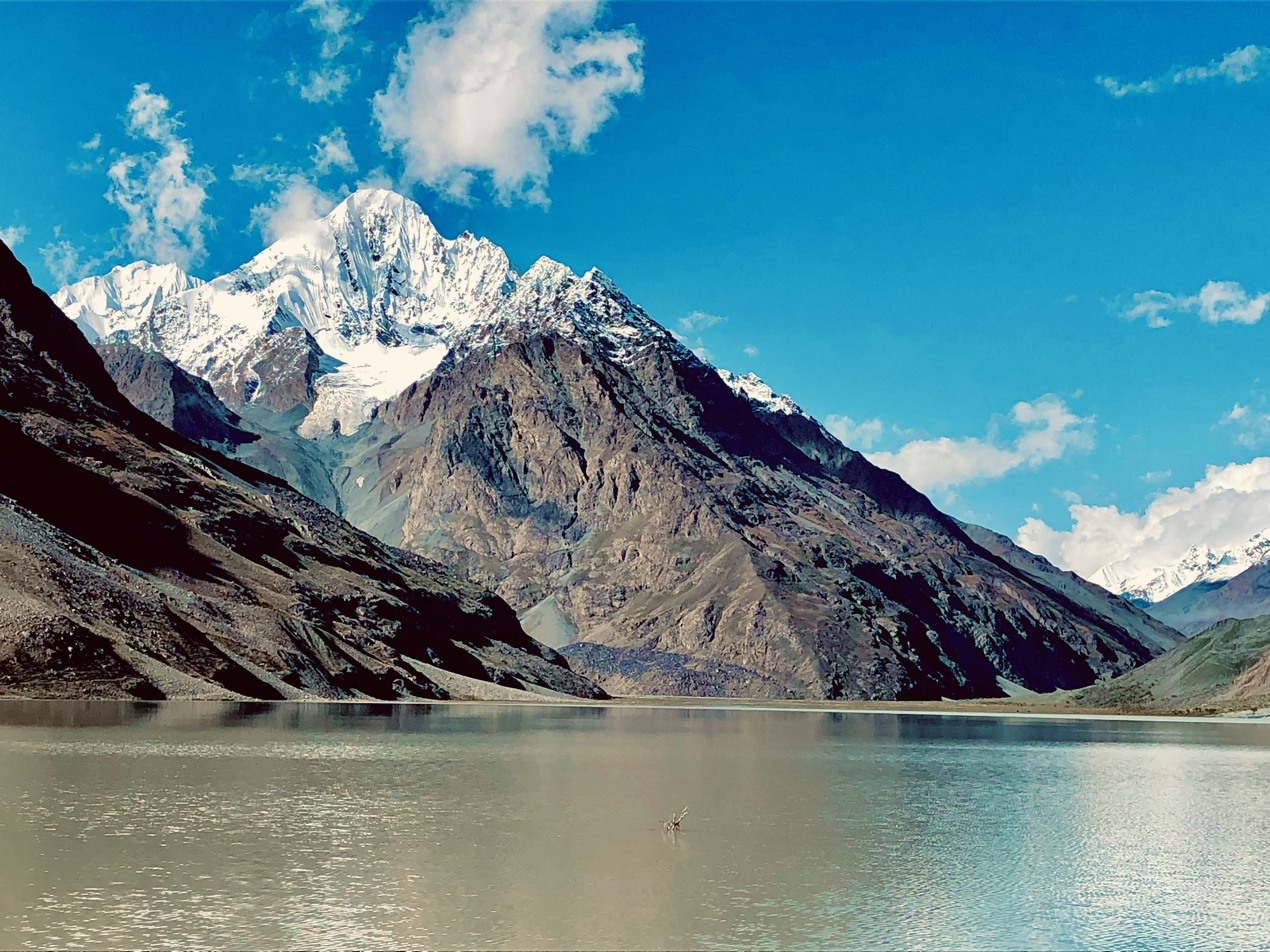
- Top: Qaqlasht Meadows above Buni; Bottom: Bashqar Gol Lake in Laspur valley

- Location in the province of Khyber Pakhtunkhwa
- Country: Pakistan
- Province: Khyber Pakhtunkhwa
- Division: Malakand
- Established: 2018
- Headquarters: Buni

Government
  - Type: District Administration
  - Deputy Commissioner: Mr. Muhammad Irfan Uddin PMS (BPS-18)
  - District Police Officer: Shah Jahan (BPS-18 PSP)
  - District Health Officer: N/A

Area
  - District: 8,392 km^{2} (3,240 sq mi)

Population (2023)
  - District: 195,528
  - Density: 23.30/km^{2} (60.34/sq mi)
  - Urban: 0
  - Rural: 195,528

Literacy
  - Literacy rate: Total: 73.83%; Male: 84.87%; Female: 62.11%
- Time zone: UTC+5 (PST)
- Numbers of Tehsils: 2
- Website: upperchitral.kp.gov.pk

Upper Chitral District (Khowar: توری ݯھیترارو ضلع; Urdu: ضلع چترال بالا) is an administrative district in the province of Khyber Pakhtunkhwa, Pakistan. Kho people are the dominant ethnic group in the district, forming 99.84% of the total population.

Chitral River flows across the length of the district. Upper Chitral District along with Lower Chitral District were part of the erstwhile Chitral District which was the largest district in the Khyber-Pakhtunkhwa province, covering an area of 14,850 km^{2}. Previously, it formed part of the Chitral princely state that encompassed the region until its incorporation into the Khyber Pakhtunkhwa province of Pakistan in 14 August 1947. The former Chitral District was bifurcated into Upper Chitral and Lower Chitral Districts in November 2018.

The town of Buni is the headquarters of the Chitral Upper District. It borders Gilgit-Baltistan to the east, Badakshan province of Afghanistan to the north, Upper Dir District to the southwest and Swat District to the southeast. The narrow strip of Wakhan Corridor separates Chitral from Tajikistan in the north.

== Climate ==
Chitral has a warm steppe climate influenced by the Hindu Kush mountain range. Summers are pleasantly warm without ever getting too hot. Winters are extremely cold; longer periods with subzero temperatures are not uncommon. Precipitation figures here are higher than in other regions in Pakistan.

== Demographics ==
Historical population
Year	Pop.	±% p.a.
1961	58,213	—
1972	71,383	+1.87%
1981	86,919	+2.21%
1998	133,815	+2.57%
2017	169,297	+1.25%
2023	195,528	+2.43%

As of the 2023 census, Upper Chitral district has 26,365 households and a population of 195,528. The district has a sex ratio of 105.75 males to 100 females and a literacy rate of 73.83%: 84.87% for males and 62.11% for females. 44,351 (22.73% of the surveyed population) are under 10 years of age. The entire population lives in rural areas.

In the 2023 census, 782 (0.40% of the surveyed population) people were from religious minorities, half Christians and half 'Other' religions.

99.84% of the population spoke languages recorded as 'Other' on the census. The main language is Khowar, sometimes called Chitrali, spoken by the Dardic Kho. Wakhi and Kyrgyz is spoken in the northern regions along the Afghan border.

== Administrative Divisions ==
Tehsil	Area (km²)	Pop. (2023)	Density (ppl/km²) (2023)	Literacy rate (2023)	Union Councils
Buni Tehsil	...	...	...	...	
Mulkoh Tehsil	...	...	...	...	
Torkoh Tehsil	...	...	...	...	
Mastuj Tehsil	8,392	195,528	23.3	73.83%	

== National Assembly ==
The district along with Lower Chitral District is represented by one elected MNA (Member of National Assembly) in Pakistan National Assembly. Its constituency is NA-1.

Member of National Assembly	Party Affiliation	Year
Abdul Akbar Khan	Muttahida Majlis e-Amal	2018
Abdul Latif	PTI	2024

== Provincial Assembly ==
The district along with Lower Chitral District is represented by one elected MPA in the provincial assembly who represent the following constituencies:PK-1

== See also ==
- List of cities in Pakistan by population
  - List of cities in Azad Jammu & Kashmir by population
  - List of cities in Gilgit-Baltistan by population
  - List of cities in Khyber Pakhtunkhwa by population
  - List of cities in Balochistan by population
  - List of cities in Sindh by population
  - List of cities in Punjab, Pakistan by population
- Tehsils of Pakistan
  - Tehsils of Punjab, Pakistan
  - Tehsils of Khyber Pakhtunkhwa, Pakistan
  - Tehsils of Balochistan, Pakistan
  - Tehsils of Sindh, Pakistan
  - Tehsils of Azad Kashmir
  - Tehsils of Gilgit-Baltistan
- Districts of Pakistan
  - Districts of Khyber Pakhtunkhwa, Pakistan
  - Districts of Punjab, Pakistan
  - Districts of Balochistan, Pakistan
  - Districts of Sindh, Pakistan
  - Districts of Azad Kashmir
  - Districts of Gilgit-Baltistan
