= List of cultural heritage sites in Gilgit-Baltistan =

Following is the list of cultural heritage sites in Gilgit-Baltistan, Pakistan. According to the Pakistan Environmental Protection Agency publication on protected areas, there are only two notified archaeological sites and monuments in Gilgit-Baltistan.

Tentative UNESCO sites

ID	Name	Type	Location	District	Coordinates	Image
GB-1	Rock carvings at Butogah	Archaeological site	near Chilas	Diamer		Rock carvings at Butogah More images Upload Photo
GB-2	Rock carvings at Thalpan	Archaeological site	Chilas	Diamer		Rock carvings at Thalpan More images Upload Photo
GB-3	Rock carvings at Thor		near Chilas	Diamier		Rock carvings at Thor More images Upload Photo
GB-4	Rock carvings at Ziarat (near Talpan)		Chilas	Diamier		Rock carvings at Ziarat (near Talpan) More images Upload Photo
GB-5	Buddhist complex with images of Buddha and stupas c. 4th or 5th century AD		Shin Nala (42 km from Chilas)	Diamier		Buddhist complex with images of Buddha and stupas c. 4th or 5th century AD More images Upload Photo
GB-6	Chaqchan Mosque c. 14th century	Mosque	Khaplu	Ghangche		Chaqchan Mosque c. 14th century More images Upload Photo
GB-7	Khaplu Palace	Fort	Khaplu	Ghangche		Khaplu Palace More images Upload Photo
GB-8	Megalithic stone circles		Yasin Valley	Gupis-Yasin		Megalithic stone circles More images Upload Photo
GB-9	Alam Bridge inscriptions		Gilgit	Gilgit District	35°45′30″N 74°35′49″E	Alam Bridge inscriptions More images Upload Photo
GB-10	Danyore Rock Inscriptions		Located in a private garden in Danyore Village to the east of River Hunza and the north of River Gilgit	Gilgit		Upload Photo Upload Photo
GB-11	Kargah Buddha			Gilgit		Kargah Buddha More images Upload Photo
GB-12	Keno Daas (rock carvings)		just outside Gilgit	Gilgit		Keno Daas (rock carvings) More images Upload Photo
GB-13	Mughal Minar (stupa)			Gilgit		Mughal Minar (stupa) More images Upload Photo
GB-14	Noorpur Stupas			Gilgit		Upload Photo Upload Photo
GB-15	Baltit Fort		Karimabad, Hunza Valley	Hunza-Nagar	36°19′32″N 74°40′11″E	Baltit Fort More images Upload Photo
GB-16	Altit Fort		Altit, Hunza Valley	Hunza-Nagar		Altit Fort More images Upload Photo
GB-17	Queen Victoria tower		Karimabad, Hunza Valley	Hunza-Nagar		Queen Victoria tower More images Upload Photo
GB-18	Sacred Rock of Hunza		2 km from Ganesh village on the Karakorum Highway (KKH)	Hunza-Nagar		Sacred Rock of Hunza More images Upload Photo
GB-19	Amburik Mosque		Shigar Valley			Amburik Mosque More images Upload Photo
GB-20	Buddhist monastery 4th to 5th century AD		Shigar Valley			Upload Photo Upload Photo
GB-21	Shigar Fort		Shigar Valley			Shigar Fort More images Upload Photo
GB-22	Manthal Buddha Rock (Buddhist inscriptions)			Skardu		Manthal Buddha Rock (Buddhist inscriptions) More images Upload Photo
GB-23	Skardu Fort		Skardu	Skardu		Skardu Fort More images Upload Photo
GB-24	(wooden mosque)		Shigar Valley			Upload Photo Upload Photo
GB-25	Khilingrong Mosque		Shigar Valley			Khilingrong Mosque More images Upload Photo
