= History of Gilgit-Baltistan =

Gilgit-Baltistan is an administrative territory of Pakistan that borders the province of Khyber Pakhtunkhwa to the west, Azad Kashmir to the southwest, Wakhan Corridor of Afghanistan to the northwest, the Xinjiang Uyghur Autonomous Region of China to the north, and the Indian-administered region of Jammu and Kashmir to the south and south-east.

The early recorded history of the region is linked with Western Tibet. The region appears to have been part of the Tibetan Empire, with Buddhism flourishing in the region by 5th century. Later, Buddhist Patola Shahis ruled the region. However, by the 13th century, the region came under Islamic influence, notably under the Maqpon Kings of Baltistan and Trakhan dynasty of Gilgit. This resulted in local ethnic groups, Shina, Burusho and Kho converting to Islam in almost their entirety and the separation of the Balti people from the Buddhist Ladakhi neighbours. The Baltis increasingly converted from Buddhism to Islam, resulting in increased interaction and conflict with their Kashmiri Muslim neighbours. Muslim rule in the area ended with the expansion of the Sikh Empire followed by the Dogra dynasty. After the defeat of the Sikhs in the Anglo-Sikh wars, most of the region was ruled by the Dogras under British paramountcy. The region became part of the newly formed state of Pakistan after the Gilgit rebellion in the first Kashmir war.

== Sources ==
=== Ancient history ===
There exists no indigenous written record of the region for its ancient history; however, rock art (petroglyphs) and inscriptions are abundant, especially along the Karakoram Highway, such as those at Shatial, which have been used to reconstruct a rough history.

=== Medieval history ===
No extant manuscripts pertaining to the history of the region from premodern times have been located. A Persian chronicle, Shigarnama, dates to the 17th century and is one of the few sources on the history of the region written prior to the advent of British colonial rule.

Ḥashmatullah Khan's Mukhtaṣar Tarikh-e Jammun va Kashmir (1939) and Rajah Shah Rais Khan's Tarikh-e-Gilgit (unpublished manuscript; 1941, later edited, translated and published by A. H. Dani in 1987) remain the chief sources. H. Khan was a Dogra official, who oversaw the administration of Gilgit-Baltistan and drafted a gazetteer of the entire region, borrowing from official documents, local clerics, epic literature, oral folklore, and ruins, etc. Notwithstanding the briefness, his chronologies are internally inconsistent and Dani advises caution in using the material. Despite, it has become an authoritative reference for local historians. Shah Rais Khan was a descendant of the Trakhan family and compiled what was essentially a family history. Dani found it to be heavily biased towards the Trakhans and severely contemptuous of neighboring powers. Other important sources are 19th-century Tarikh-i-Chitral and Shahnamah-i-Chitral, which primarily deal with the Kator dynasty of neighbouring Chitral, but also the areas which came under its sway such as Yasin, Punial, Ghizer and Ishkoman.

== Early history ==
There are more than 50,000 pieces of rock art (petroglyphs) and inscriptions all along the Karakoram Highway in Gilgit Baltistan, concentrated at ten major sites between Hunza Nagar and Shatial. The carvings were left by various invaders, traders, and pilgrims who passed along the trade route, as well as by locals. The earliest date back to between 5000 and 1000 BCE, showing single animals, triangular men and hunting scenes in which the animals are larger than the hunters. These carvings were pecked into the rock with stone tools and are covered with a thick patina that proves their age.

The ethnologist Karl Jettmar has pieced together the history of the area from various inscriptions and recorded his findings in Rock Carvings and Inscriptions in the Northern Areas of Pakistan and the later released Between Gandhara and the Silk Roads: Rock Carvings Along the Karakoram Highway.

Rock carvings

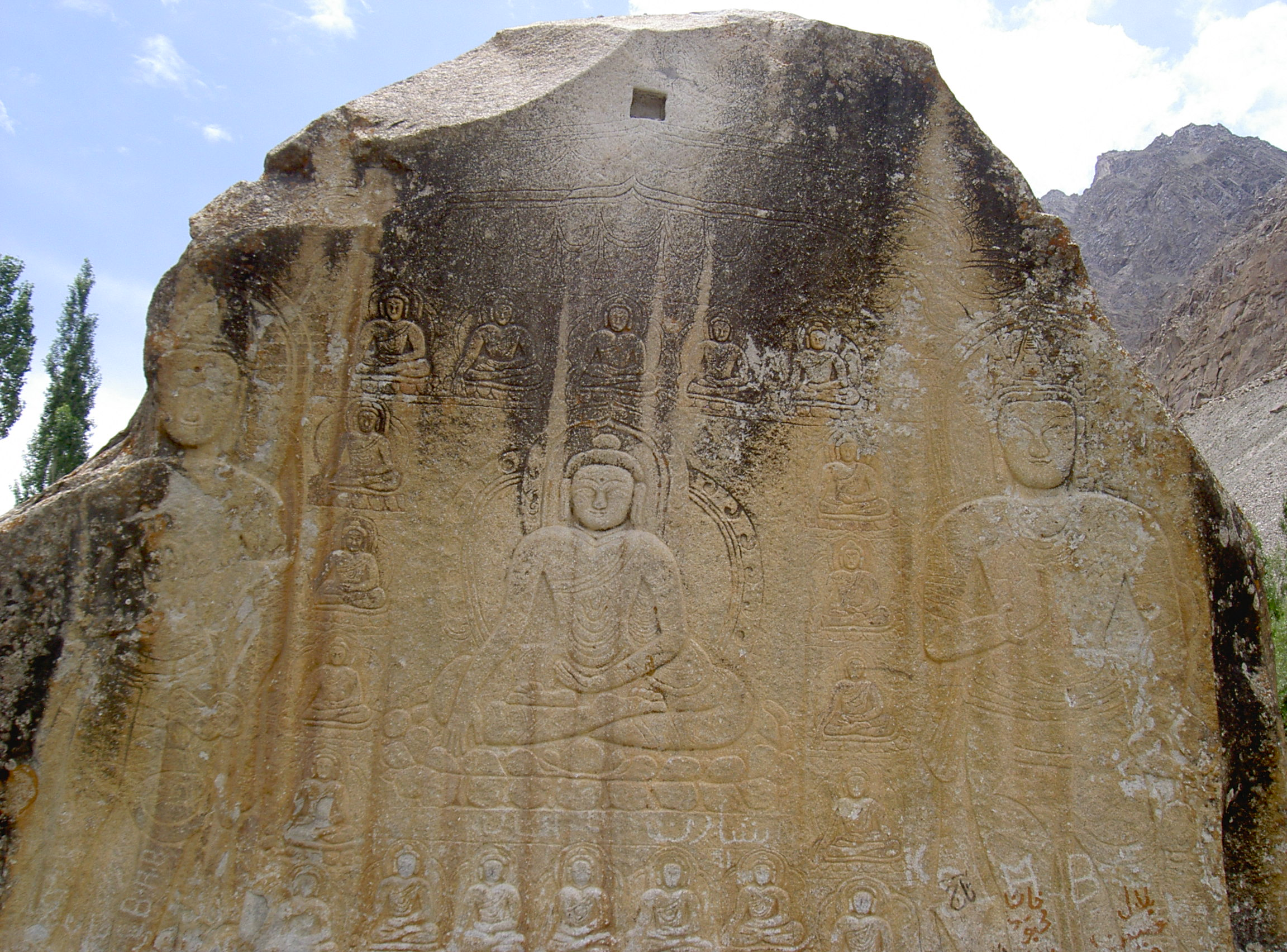
Manthal Buddha Rock in outskirts of Skardu city

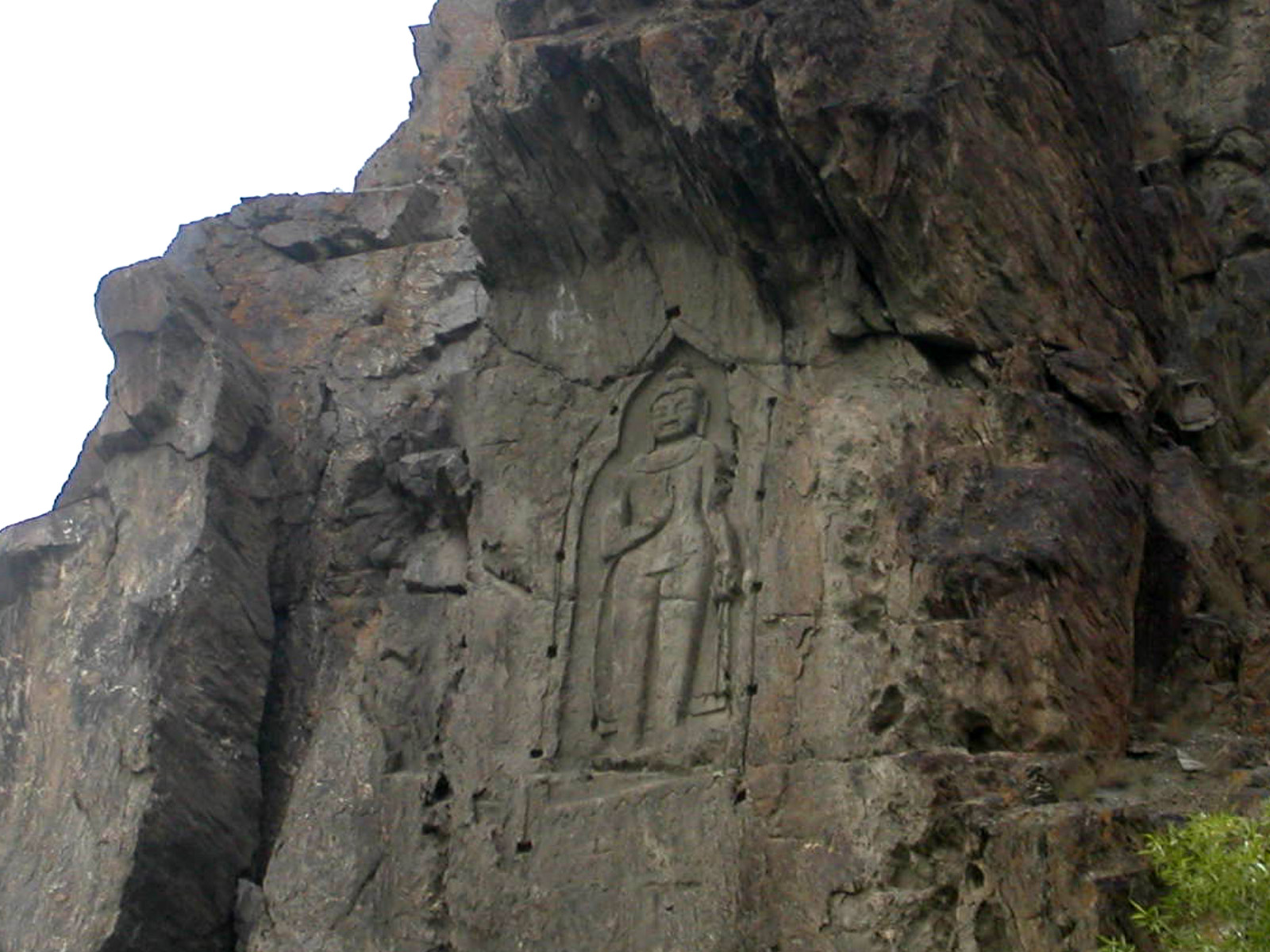
Photograph of Kargah Buddha

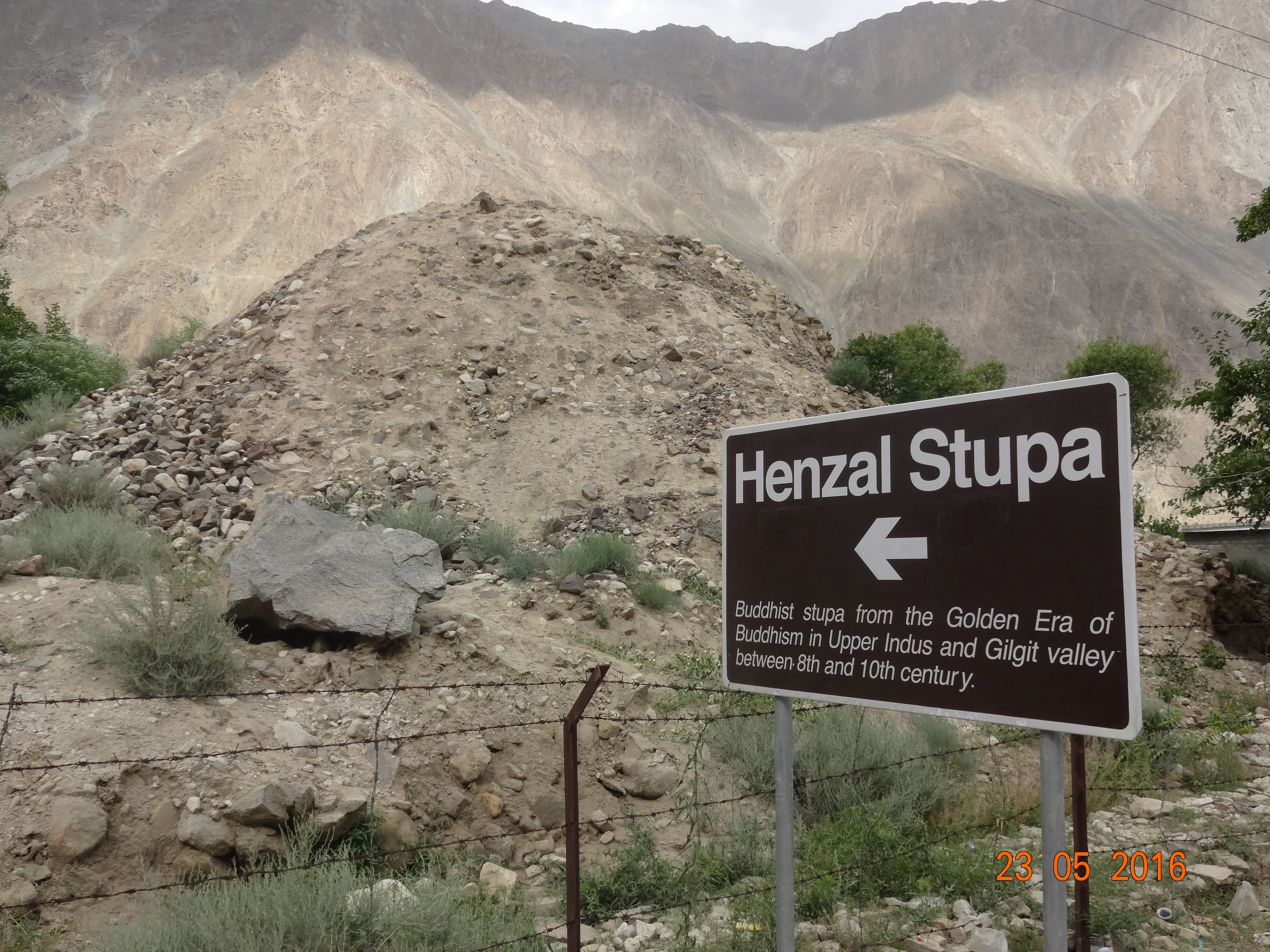
The Hanzal stupa dates from the Buddhist era

"The ancient Stupa – rock carvings of Buddha, everywhere in the region is a pointer to the firm hold of the Buddhist rules for such a long time."

The rock carvings found in various places in Gilgit-Baltistan, especially those found in the Passu village of hunza Nagar, suggest a human presence since 2000 BC. It is believed that the Burusho people were the indigenous of the region and were pushed higher into the mountains by the movements of the Indo-Aryans, who traveled southward sometime around 1800 BCE. Within the next few centuries of human settlement on the Tibetan Plateau, this region became inhabited by Tibetans, who preceded the Balti people of Baltistan. Today Baltistan bears similarity to Ladakh physically and culturally (although not in religion). Dards are found mainly in the western areas. These people are the Shina-speaking peoples of Gilgit, Chilas, Astore and Diamir, while in Hunza Nagar and the upper regions, speakers of Burushaski and Khowar (another Dardic language) predominate. The Dards find mention in the works of Herodotus, (Note: He twice mentions a people called Dadikai, first along with the Gandarioi, and again in the catalogue of king Xerxes's army invading Greece. Herodotus also mentions the gold-digging ants of Central Asia.) Nearchus, Megasthenes, Pliny, (Note: In the 1st century, Pliny repeats that the Dards were great producers of gold.) Ptolemy, (Note: Ptolemy situates the Daradrai on the upper reaches of the Indus) and the geographical lists of the Puranas. In the 1st century, the people of these regions were followers of the Bon religion while in the 2nd century, they followed Buddhism.

== Medieval history ==
=== Patola Shahis ===
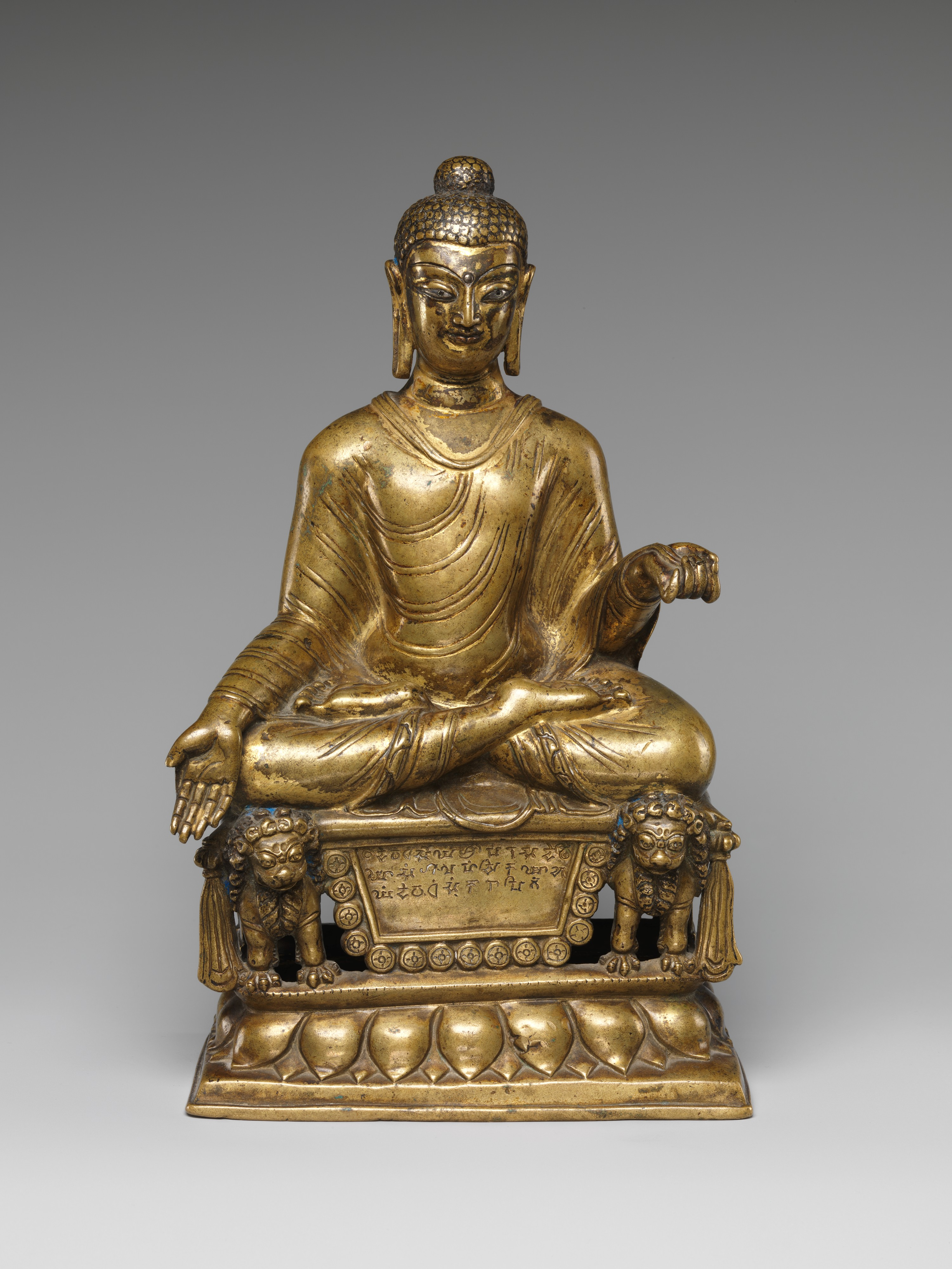
Enthroned Buddha with inscription, Gilgit Kingdom, circa 600 CE.

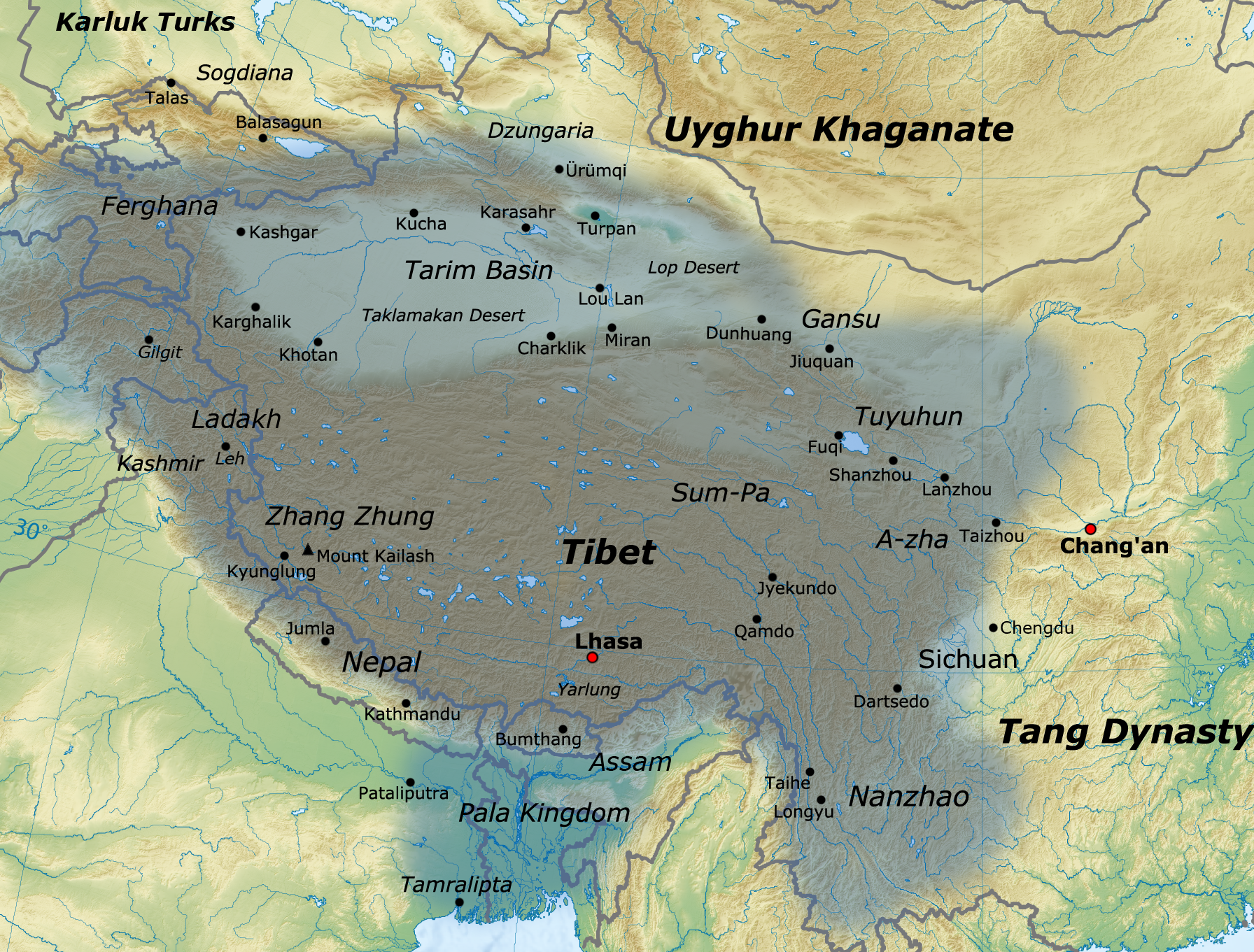
Map of Tibetan Empire citing the areas of Gilgit-Baltistan as part of its kingdom in 780–790 CE

Between 399 and 414, the Chinese Buddhist pilgrim Faxian visited Gilgit-Baltistan, while in the 6th century Somana Patola (greater Gilgit-Chilas) was ruled by an unknown king. Between 627 and 645, the Chinese Buddhist pilgrim Xuanzang travelled through this region on his pilgrimage to India.

According to Chinese records from the Tang dynasty, between the 600s and the 700s, the region was governed by a Buddhist dynasty referred to as Bolü (Chinese: 勃律; pinyin: bólǜ), also transliterated as Palola, Patola, Balur. They are believed to be the Patola Sāhi dynasty mentioned in a Brahmi inscription, and are devout adherents of Vajrayana Buddhism. At the time, Little Palola (Chinese: 小勃律) was used to refer to Gilgit, while Great Palola (Chinese: 大勃律) was used to refer to Baltistan. However, the records do not consistently disambiguate the two.

In mid-600s, Gilgit came under Chinese suzerainty after the fall of Western Turkic Khaganate due to Tang military campaigns in the region. In the late 600s CE, the rising Tibetan Empire wrestled control of the region from the Chinese. However, faced with growing influence of the Umayyad Caliphate and then the Abbasid Caliphate to the west, the Tibetans were forced to ally themselves with the Islamic caliphates. The region was then contested by Chinese and Tibetan forces, and their respective vassal states, until the mid-700s. Rulers of Gilgit formed an alliance with the Tang Chinese and held back the Arabs with their help.

Between 644 and 655, Navasurendrāditya-nandin became king of Palola Sāhi dynasty in Gilgit. Numerous Sanskrit inscriptions, including the Danyor Rock Inscriptions, were discovered to be from his reign. In the late 600s and early 700s, Jayamaṅgalavikramāditya-nandin was king of Gilgit.

According to Chinese court records, in 717 and 719 respectively, delegations of a ruler of Great Palola (Baltistan) named Su-fu-she-li-ji-li-ni (Chinese: 蘇弗舍利支離泥; pinyin: sūfúshèlìzhīlíní) reached the Chinese imperial court. By at least 719/720, Ladakh (Mard) became part of the Tibetan Empire. By that time, Buddhism was practiced in Baltistan, and Sanskrit was the written language. Buddhism became firmly established in the region. Great monasteries were established, with education in Sanskrit language regarding Indian religions and philosophy. Trade expanded between Ladakh in India and Gilgit-Baltistan. The rulers of Leh in Ladakh, India became increasingly influential in Balti culture and customs, and the chiefs of the region became vassals to the Ladakhis and Tibetan paramountcy.

In 720, the delegation of Surendrāditya (Chinese: 蘇麟陀逸之; pinyin: sūlíntuóyìzhī) reached the Chinese imperial court. He was referred to by the Chinese records as the king of Great Palola; however, it is unknown if Baltistan was under Gilgit rule at the time. The Chinese emperor also granted the ruler of Cashmere, Chandrāpīḍa ("Tchen-fo-lo-pi-li"), the title of "King of Cashmere". By 721/722, Baltistan had come under the influence of the Tibetan Empire.

In 721–722, Tibetan army attempted but failed to capture Gilgit or Bruzha (Yasin valley). By this time, according to Chinese records, the king of Little Palola was Mo-ching-mang (Chinese: 沒謹忙; pinyin: méijǐnmáng). He had visited Tang court requesting military assistance against the Tibetans. Between 723 and 728, the Korean Buddhist pilgrim Hyecho passed through this area. In 737/738, Tibetan troops under the leadership of Minister Bel Kyesang Dongtsab of Emperor Me Agtsom took control of Little Palola. By 747, the Chinese army under the leadership of the ethnic-Korean commander Gao Xianzhi had recaptured Little Palola.

Great Palola was subsequently captured by the Chinese army in 753 under the military Governor Feng Changqing. However, by 755, due to the An Lushan rebellion, the Tang Chinese forces withdrew and was no longer able to exert influence in Central Asia and in the regions around Gilgit-Baltistan. The control of the region was left to the Tibetan Empire. They referred to the region as Bruzha, a toponym that is consistent with the ethnonym "Burusho" used today. Tibetan control of the region lasted until late-800s CE.

=== Gilgit ===
Ahmad Hasan Dani notes local tradition to mention a Trakhan dynasty succeeding to the Patola Shahis, and ruling uninterruptedly until the 19th century for over a millennium. He put forward a tentative reconstruction of the dynasty, deriving from H. Khan and Rais Khan's histories of the region. Historical evidence — coins, inscriptions etc. — corroborating the narrative was absent during Dani's time and those which have been since discovered, reject the presence of any such dynasty.

==== List of Trakhan rulers ====
Ruler	Reign	Lineage and notes
Shri Badat	760s–780	Local Buddhist king before Azur Jamshid. Probably of Turkic origin.
Azur Jamshid	780–796	Kayani prince of Persia who is said to have fled here after the Arab conquest of Persia. Existence disputed
Nur Bakht Khatun	?–?	Daughter of Shri Badat, wife of Azur Jamshid
Kark (or Gark)	?–?	Son of Azur Jamshid. Ruled 55 years
Rajah Sau Malik	?–?	
Rajah Shah Malik	?–?	Son of Rajah Sau Malik. Also known as Glit Kalika (or Malik), i.e. Malik of Gilgit
Deng Malik	?–?	Son of Glit Kalika (Rajah Shah Malik)
Khusraw Khan	?–997	Son of Deng Malik. Married a princess from Badakhshan. The presence of a Badakhshani princess must have led to the strengthening of northern influence in the royal house of Gilgit through this Turkic family which came from the north, by the end of the tenth century.
Rajah Haydar Khan	997–1057	Had a struggle for reign with his cousin Shah Hatam (or Shah Tham) who governed the Nager and Hunza valleys. Shah Hatam was defeated and fled to Baltistan
Nur Khan	1057–1127	Son of Rajah Haydar Khan
Shah Mirza	1127–1205	Son of Nur Khan
Tartora Khan	1205–1236	Son of Shah Mirza. Poisoned by his queen who is a commander of Darel valley.
the Dareli queen (name unknown)	1236–1241	Tried to kill her stepson Torra but failed.
Torra Khan	1241–1275	Formed the name Trakhan for the dynasty which is known Kayanıs before.
Shah Ra’is Khan	1275	Shah Ra’is Khan refuged to Badakhshani ruler Tajdar-i Moghul. Tajdar-i Moghul invaded Gilgit, dethroned Torra Khan and placed Shah Ra’is Khan to the throne. This was the beginning of the Ra’isiyya dynasty.
Sau Malik II	1276–1345	Son of Torra Khan
Chilis Khan	1345–1359	Married Malika Hashim Begam, a daughter of Shah Ra’is Khan
Rajah Firdaws Khan	1359–1397	He had the Qilca-yi Firdawsiyya built in Gilgit.
Khusraw Khan II	1397–1422	He added a tower to his father’s fort at Gilgit, which was known as KhusrawKhan-i Shikar.
Rajah Malik Shah	1422–1449	Son of Khusraw Khan II
Torra Khan II	1449–1479	Son of Rajah Malik Shah
a quick succession of rulers	1479–?	
Shah Ra’is Azam	?–1561	
?	1561–1821	Trakhan dynasty lasted with a series of unknown local rulers until 1821

=== Baltistan ===
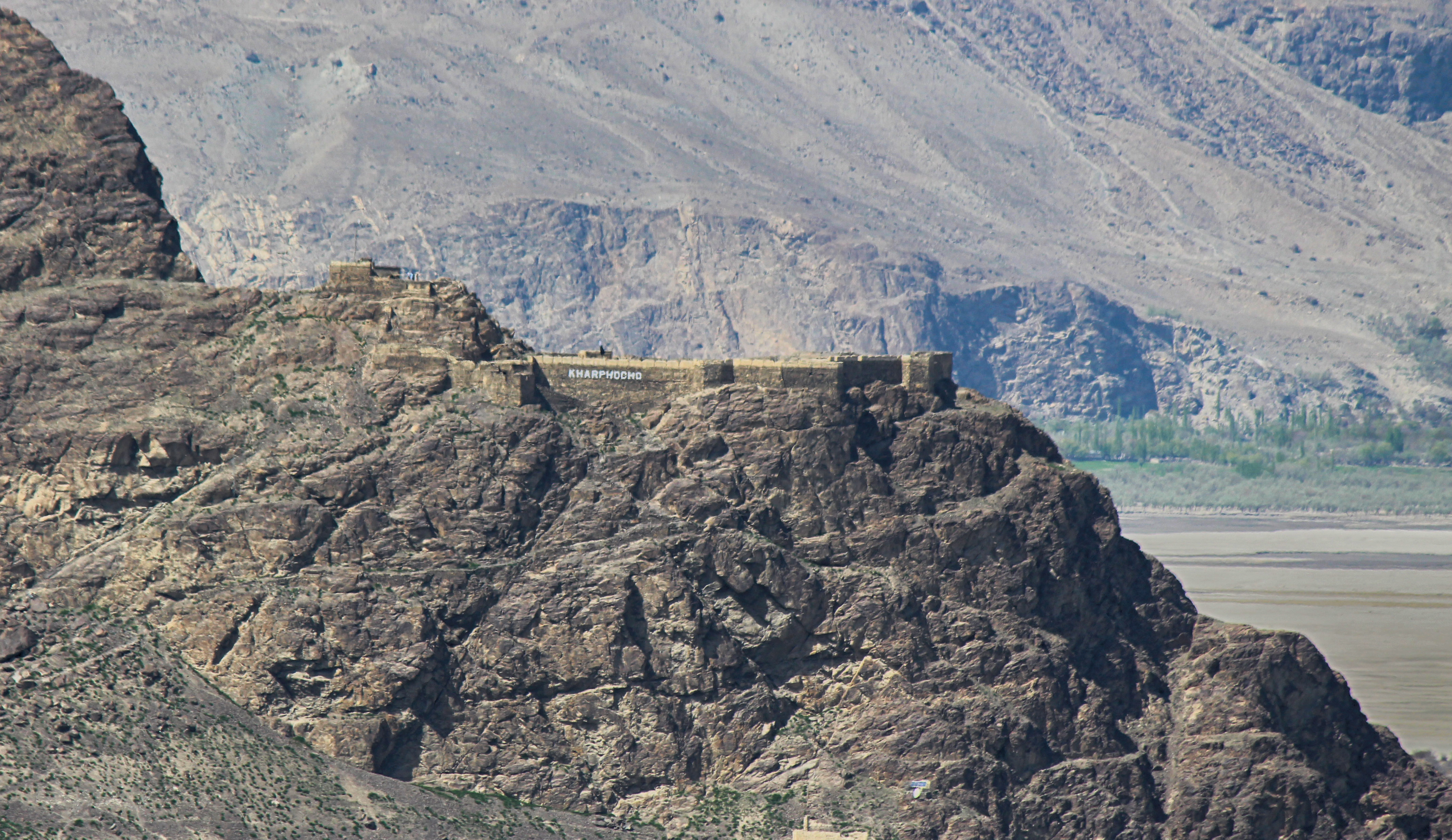
Skardu Fort was seat of power of Maqpon Dynasty

In the 14th century, Sufi Muslim preachers from Persia and Central Asia introduced Islam in Baltistan. Famous amongst them was Mir Sayyid Ali Hamadani who came via Kashmir while in the Gilgit region Islam entered in the same century through Turkic Tarkhan rulers. Gilgit-Baltistan was ruled by many local rulers, amongst whom the Maqpon dynasty of Skardu and the Rajas of Hunza are well-known. The Maqpons of Skardu unified Baltistan with Chitral and Ladakh, especially in the era of Ali Sher Khan Anchan who had friendly relations with the Mughal court. Anchan reign brought prosperity and entertained art, sport, and variety in architecture. He introduced polo to the Gilgit region and from Chitral, he sent a group of musicians to Delhi to learn Indian music; the Mughal architecture influenced the architecture of the region as well. Later Anchan in his successors Abdal Khan had great influence though in the popular literature of Baltistan he is still alive as a dark figure by the nickname "Mizos" "man-eater". The last Maqpons Raja, Ahmed Shah, ruled all of Baltistan between 1811 and 1840. The areas of Gilgit, Chitral and Hunza had already become independent of the Maqpons.

=== Hunza ===
Hunza was a principality established in 1200s by a scion of the Trakhan dynasty of Gilgit. It later became a princely state in a subsidiary alliance with British India from 1892 to August 1947, for three months was unaligned, and then from November 1947 until 1974 was a princely state of Pakistan.

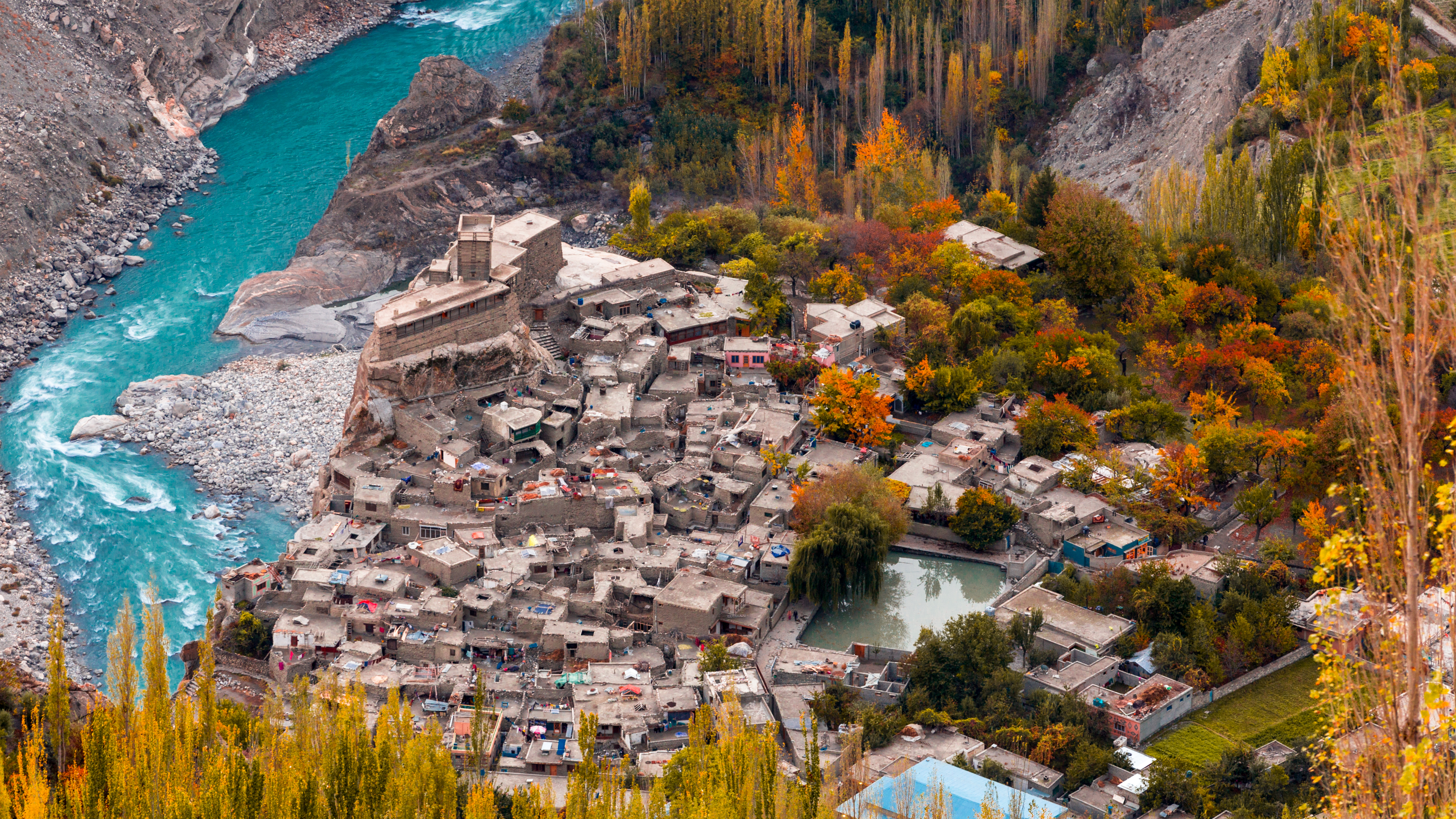
Altit Fort was state capital of Hunza Kingdom.

=== Nagar ===
Nagar was another principality ruled by a cadet branch of Trakhan dynasty of Gilgit. The British gained control of Nagar during the Anglo-Brusho war, locally known as Jangir-e-Lae. Jangir-e-Lae was fought between the people of Nagar state and the troops of the British Raj at Nilt from 1 to 23 December 1891.This valley is situated along the Karakoram Highway, as one travels northward from the city of Gilgit.

== Modern history ==
=== Princely state of Jammu and Kashmir ===
It took a long time for the Maharajahs Ghulab Singh and Ranbir Singh to extend their writ over Gilgit, Hunza and Nagar, and not until 1870 did they assert their authority over Gilgit town. The grip of the Jammu and Kashmir government over this area was tenuous. One of the first British officials to visit the region was G. T. Vinge. The region was practically independent of British influence. However, Vinge secured the confidence of the local duke of Baltistan, and received valuable antiquity and manuscripts during his mission.

The British Indian government undertook administrative reforms in 1885 and created Gilgit Agency in 1889 as a way for the British to secure the region as a buffer from the Russians. As a result of Great Game, with British fear of Russian activities in Chinese Sinkiang increasing, in 1935 the Gilgit Agency was expanded by the Maharajah Hari Singh leasing the Gilgit Wazarat to the government of India for a period of sixty years and for an amount of 75,000 rupees. This gave the British political agent complete control of defence, communications and foreign relations as the Kashmiri state retained civil administration and the British retained control of defence and foreign affairs.

After World War II British influence started declining. British gave the princely states under subsidiary alliance with British Raj choice to join either of the two newly established states, India and Pakistan, or to remain independent. In 1947, Mountbatten decided to terminate the lease of Gilgit by Kashmir to the British. Scholar Yaqoob Khan Bangash opines that the motive for this is unclear.

The people of Gilgit considered themselves to be ethnically different from the Kashmiris and resented being under Kashmir state rule. Major William Brown, the Maharaja's commander of the Gilgit Scouts, believed that the British handover of Gilgit to Kashmir was a huge mistake.

Brown recounts that when he met the scouts ''they indirectly made it clear how they despised and hated Kashmir and everything connected with it, how happy and content they had been under the British rule, and how they considered they had been betrayed by the British in the unconditional handing over of their country to Kashmir''.

=== 1947 Gilgit revolt ===
On 26 October 1947, Maharaja Hari Singh of Jammu and Kashmir, faced with an invasion by Pakistani tribal fighters, signed the Instrument of Accession, joining India. Gilgit's population did not favour the princely state's accession to India. Muzzaffar Bangash, the raja orderly in Chilas, told Major Brown that the whole of Gilgit Agency was pro-Pakistan. They would accept Kashmir being independent but accession to "Hindustan" (India) was unacceptable. According to Scholar Yaqoob Khan Bangash:

"By the middle of 1947 news of communal tensions had reached Gilgit and in a place where Hindu Dogras were despised for their heavy-handedness during the conflicts to subdue Gilgit, stories of Muslims being slaughtered by Hindus and Sikhs in the Punjab inflamed passions against the small minorities of Hindus and Sikhs in Gilgit."

Major Brown, sensing the discontent of the people of Gilgit Agency, Brown mutinied on 1 November 1947, overthrowing the Governor Ghansara Singh. The bloodless coup d'etat was planned by Brown to the last detail under the code name Datta Khel. Brown is also credited with saving the Hindu population in Gilgit from being harmed. According to scholar Brian Cloughley, Brown acted to prevent bloodshed and took some personal risk in doing so.

On the morning of 2 November 1947, after the Pakistan flag had been raised in the lines of Gilgit Scouts. Then provisional government (Aburi Hakoomat) was established with Shah Rais Khan as president, Mirza Hassan khan as commander-in-chief and Major Brown as the chief military advisor. However, Brown had already telegraphed the chief minister of NWFP, Khan Abdul Qayyum Khan, asking Pakistan to take over the administration. The Pakistani Political Agent, Khan Mohammad Alam Khan, arrived on 16 November and took over the administration of Gilgit. On 18 November 1947, the provisional government requested to see the Political Agent asserting that he should take all decisions in consultation with them. They demanded that both British officers be relieved of their duties and local officers should be appointed in their place. Brown narrates:

Alam replied, "you are a crowd of fools led astray by a madman. I shall not tolerate this nonsense for one instance...And when the Indian Army starts invading you there will be no use screaming to Pakistan for help, because you won't get it."... The provisional government faded away after this encounter with Alam Khan, clearly reflecting the flimsy and opportunistic nature of its basis and support.

The provisional government lasted 16 days. The provisional government lacked sway over the population. The Gilgit rebellion did not have civilian involvement and was solely the work of military leaders, not all of whom had been in favor of joining Pakistan, at least in the short term. Dani mentions that although there was lack of public participation in the rebellion, pro-Pakistan sentiments were intense in the civilian population and their anti-Kashmiri sentiments were also clear. Scholar Yaqoob Khan Bangash states that the people of Gilgit as well as those of Chilas, Koh Ghizr, Ishkoman, Yasin, Punial, Hunza and Nagar joined Pakistan by choice.

After taking control of Gilgit, the Gilgit Scouts (a paramilitary force comprising trained Muslim locals but commanded by British officers) along with Azad irregulars moved towards Baltistan and Ladakh and captured Skardu by August 1948 under colonel Mata ul-Mulk. They successfully blocked the Indian reinforcements and subsequently captured Dras and Kargill as well, cutting off the Indian communications to Leh in Ladakh. The Indian forces mounted an offensive in Autumn 1948 and recaptured all of Kargil district. Baltistan region, however, came under rebels' control.

On 1 January 1948, India took the issue of Jammu and Kashmir to the United Nations Security Council. In April 1948, the Council passed a resolution calling for Pakistan to withdraw from all of Jammu and Kashmir and then India was to reduce its forces to the minimum level, following which a plebiscite would be held to ascertain the people's wishes. However, no withdrawal was ever carried out, India insisting that Pakistan had to withdraw first and Pakistan contending that there was no guarantee that India would withdraw afterwards. Gilgit-Baltistan and a western portion of the state called Azad Jammu and Kashmir) have remained under the control of Pakistan since then. Sudheendra Kulkarni, who served as an aide to India's former Prime Minister Atal Bihari Vajpayee, states that in all the discussions held by Indian leadership including Vallabhbhai Patel regarding plebiscite in Jammu and Kashmir, hardly ever talked about holding plebiscite in Gilgit Baltistan.

The decision of Gilgit to join Pakistan on November 2, along with the accession by the Mirs of Hunza and Nagar to Pakistan the following day was not challenged by any Indian leaders like Vallabhbhai Patel or Jawaharlal Nehru. V. P. Menon in his book states that 'accession of Gilgit to India would have provoked adverse reactions in Gilgit and certain areas contiguous to Pakistan.'

Narendra Singh Sarila, former aide de camp to Lord Louis Mountbatten and former ambassador to France, states in his book that "Lord Mountbatten was eager to have the Kashmir dispute resolved before he resigned from the governor-generalship in June 1948. At his request, V. P. Menon and Sir N. Gopalaswami Ayyangar, drew up a plan for partition of the state, complete with maps (which left Gilgit to Pakistan). On 23 July 1948, V.P. Menon told the chargé d'affaires of the US embassy in Delhi that the Indian government will accept settlement based on accession of Mirpur, Poonch, Muzaffarabad and Gilgit to Pakistan."

== After independence ==
The Pakistani parts of Kashmir to the north and west of the cease-fire line established at the end of the Indo-Pakistani War of 1947, or the Line of Control as it later came to be called, were divided into the Northern Areas (72,971 km^{2}) in the north and the Pakistani state of Azad Kashmir (13,297 km^{2}) in the south. During 1947 to 1970 Government of Pakistan established Gilgit Agency and Baltistan Agency. In 1970, Northern Areas Council was established by Zulfiqar Ali Bhutto. Gilgit Baltistan was directly administered by federal government as FANA (Federally Administered Northern Areas). In 1963, Pakistan gave up claim on Shaksgam Valley in return of China ceding Shimshal Valley in the Sino-Pakistan Agreement, pending settlement of the dispute over Kashmir. This area is also known as the Trans-Karakoram Tract. The name "Northern Areas" was first used by the United Nations to refer to the northern areas of Kashmir.

The Northern Light Infantry of the region participated in the 1999 Kargil conflict. Over five hundred soldiers were believed to have been killed and buried in the Northern Areas in that action. Lalak Jan, a soldier from Yasin Valley, was awarded Pakistan's most prestigious medal, the Nishan-e-Haider, for his courageous actions during the Kargil conflict. In the same year, the 1999 Supreme Court judgement by the Supreme Court of Pakistan for determination of the constitutional status of Gilgit-Baltistan declared the people of Northern Areas as Pakistani citizens with all fundamental rights.

=== Self-governing status and present-day Gilgit Baltistan ===
On 29 August 2009, the Gilgit Baltistan Empowerment and Self-Governance Order, 2009, was passed by the Pakistani cabinet and signed by the President of Pakistan. The order granted self-rule to the people of the former Northern Areas, now renamed Gilgit Baltistan, by creating, among other things, an elected legislative assembly. According to Antia Mato Bouzas, the 2009 Governance Order was the Pakistani government's compromise between its official stand on Kashmir and the demands of a territory where the majority of people may have pro-Pakistan sentiments. Gilgit Baltistan United Movement while rejecting the new package demanded an independent and autonomous legislative assembly for Gilgit-Baltistan with the installation of local authoritative government as per the UNCIP resolutions.

Gilgit-Baltistan presently consists of ten districts, has a population of over 1.7 million, and an area of around 28,000 square miles (73,000 km^{2}). It shares borders with China, Afghanistan, and Indian-administered Jammu and Kashmir as well as Ladakh. The people of Gilgit-Baltistan are Pakistani nationals, having Pakistani passports and identity cards, although the territory is not represented in the Parliament of Pakistan. A seven-member bench of the Supreme Court of Pakistan was told in November 2018 that the Federal Government had appointed a high-level committee to examine the constitutional reforms of Gilgit-Baltistan.

== Historical demographics ==
Religious groups in Gilgit–Baltistan (Jammu & Kashmir Princely State era)
Religious group	1891		1901		1911		1921		1931		1941 (Note: The figures for total population in 1941: Gilgit Agency: 76,526 Gilgit Leased Area: 22,495 Astore District: 17,026 Skardu Tehsil: 106,271 Kargil area which came under Pakistani control: 13,130)	
Religious group	Pop.	%	Pop.	%	Pop.	%	Pop.	%	Pop.	%	Pop.	%
Islam	110,161	86.68%	58,779	96.54%	77,189	98.45%	88,643	98.82%	94,940	98.44%	234,727	99.69%
Tribal	16,615	13.07%	—N/a	—N/a	—N/a	—N/a	—N/a	—N/a	0	0%	2	0%
Buddhism	239	0.19%	0	0%	0	0%	0	0%	0	0%	0	0%
Hinduism	77	0.06%	2,001	3.29%	1,112	1.42%	948	1.06%	1,361	1.41%	570	0.24%
Christianity	2	0%	28	0.05%	22	0.03%	16	0.02%	49	0.05%	28	0.01%
Sikhism	0	0%	74	0.12%	81	0.1%	90	0.1%	93	0.1%	121	0.1%
Jainism	0	0%	1	0%	0	0%	0	0%	3	0%	0	0%
Zoroastrianism	0	0%	0	0%	0	0%	0	0%	0	0%	0	0%
Judaism	—N/a	—N/a	—N/a	—N/a	—N/a	—N/a	—N/a	—N/a	—N/a	—N/a	0	0%
Others	0	0%	2	0%	0	0%	0	0%	0	0%	0	0%
Total population	127,094	100%	60,885	100%	78,404	100%	89,697	100%	96,446	100%	235,448	100%
Note1: 1891 figure taken from census data using the total population of Skardu District and Gilgit District in the Princely State of Jammu and Kashmir that ultimately would be administered by Pakistan, in the contemporary administrative territory of Gilgit–Baltistan. Note2: 1901 figure taken from census data using the total population of Gilgit District in the Princely State of Jammu and Kashmir that ultimately would be administered by Pakistan, in the contemporary administrative territory of Gilgit–Baltistan. Note3: 1911–1931 figures taken from census data by combining the total population of Gilgit District and the Frontier Ilaqas in the Princely State of Jammu and Kashmir that ultimately would be administered by Pakistan, in the contemporary administrative territory of Gilgit–Baltistan. Note4: 1941 figure taken from census data by combining the total population of one district (Astore), one agency (Gilgit), one tehsil (Baltistan in Ladakh Wazarat) and one partial tehsil (31 villages in Kargil in Ladakh Wazarat) in the Princely State of Jammu and Kashmir that ultimately would be administered by Pakistan, in the contemporary administrative territory of Gilgit–Baltistan.
