= Patola Shahis =

Dynasty of Buddhist kings

- 6th century–8th century
- Approximate location of the Patola Shahis

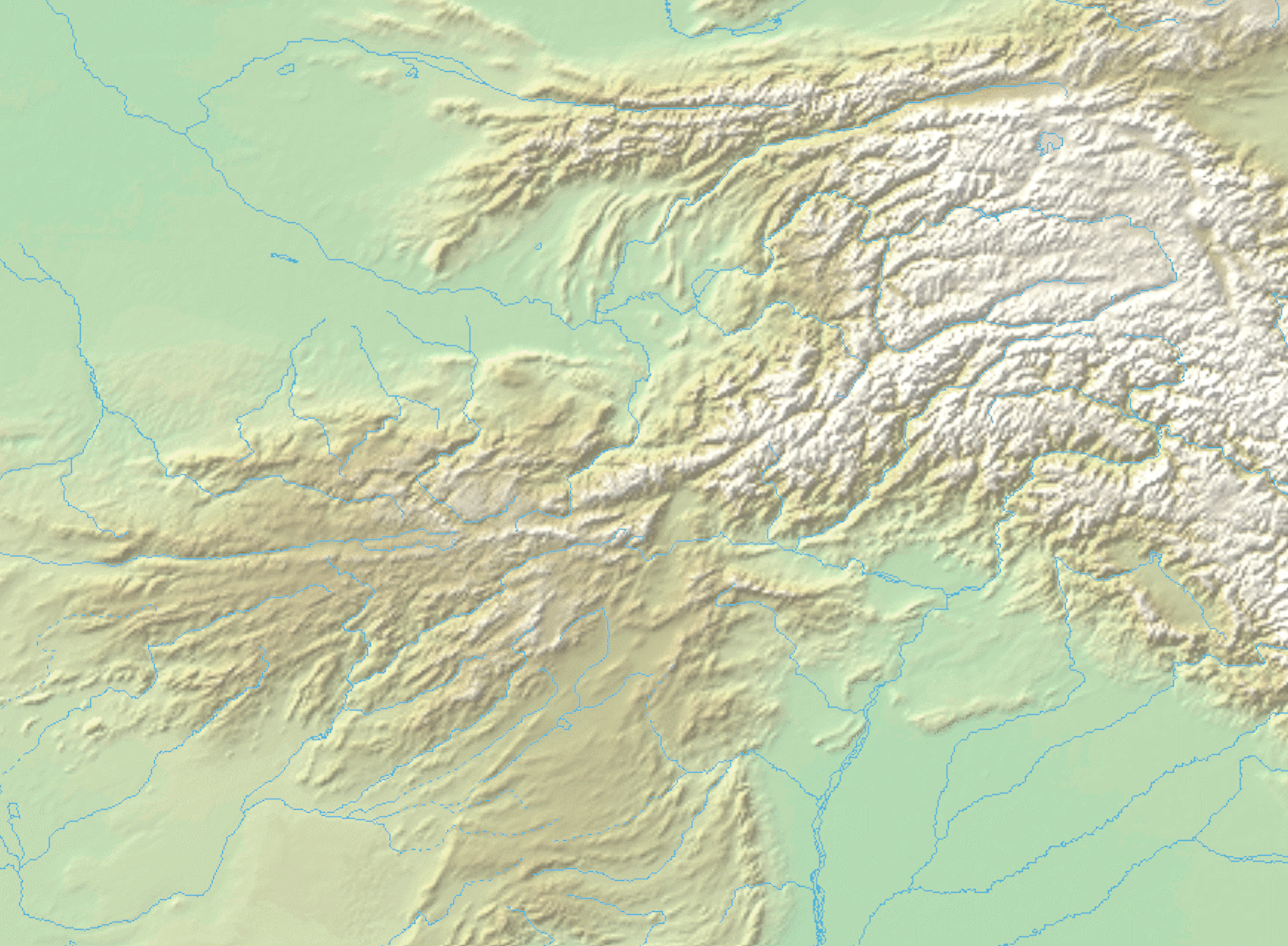
- Location of the Patola Shahis, and their capital Gilgit, with neighbouring polities.
- Status: Kingdom
- Capital: Gilgit
- Religion: Buddhism
- Historical era: Early Middle Ages
  - Established: 6th century
  - Disestablished: 8th century
- Today part of: Pakistan

The Patola Shahis, or Palola Shahis, also Gilgit Shahis, were a dynasty of Buddhist kings based in Gilgit ("Lesser Bolü") in the 6th–8th century CE. The Kingdom was located on a strategic trans-Himalayan trade route, now known as the Karakoram Highway, which branched off the Grand Trunk Road, following the important stops of Shatial and Chilas.

== Early records ==
Between 399 and 414, the Chinese Buddhist pilgrim Faxian visited Gilgit-Baltistan. Between 627 and 645, the Chinese Buddhist pilgrim Xuanzang travelled through this region on his pilgrimage to India.

According to Chinese records from the Tang dynasty, between the 600s and the 700s, the region was governed by a Buddhist dynasty referred to as Bolü (Chinese: 勃律; pinyin: bólǜ), also transliterated as Palola, Patola, Balur. They are believed to be the Patola Sāhi dynasty mentioned in a Brahmi inscription, and are devout adherents of Vajrayana Buddhism. At the time, Little Palola (Chinese: 小勃律) was used to refer to Gilgit, while Great Palola (Chinese: 大勃律) was used to refer to Baltistan. However, the records do not consistently disambiguate the two. The first known Palola Shahi, as recorded by the Tang annals, was King Somana in the 6th century CE.

A Sanskrit inscription on a gilded statue of the Buddha, mentions that it was commissioned by Queen Mangalahamsika, known as a senior queen to King Vajraditayanandi (reigned 585–605 CE) by Gilgit manuscripts. The Sanskrit inscription reads: “Om. This is a pious gift. This pious gift was ordered to be made by the Shri Paramadevi [Highest Queen] Mangalahamsika”.

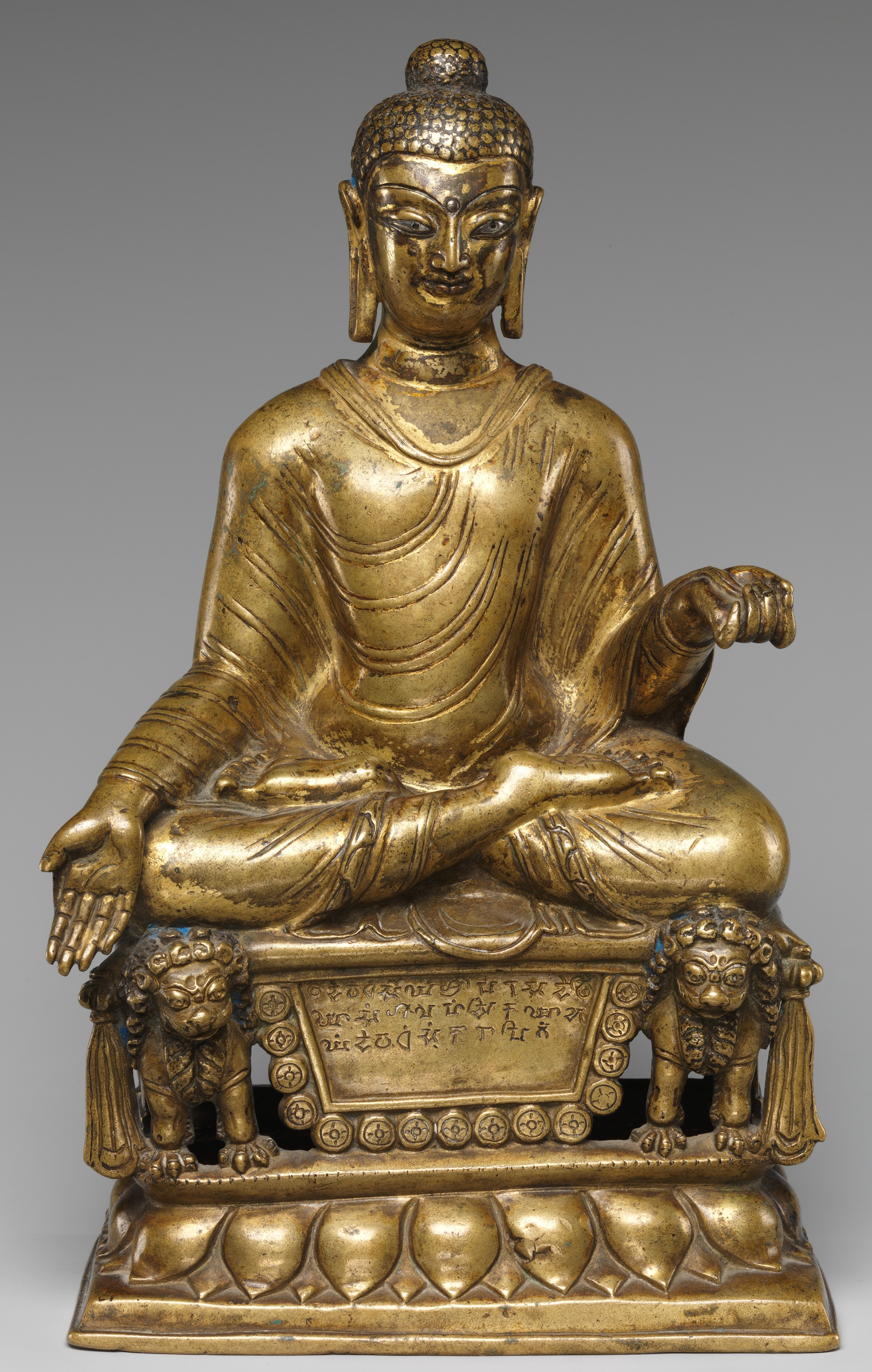
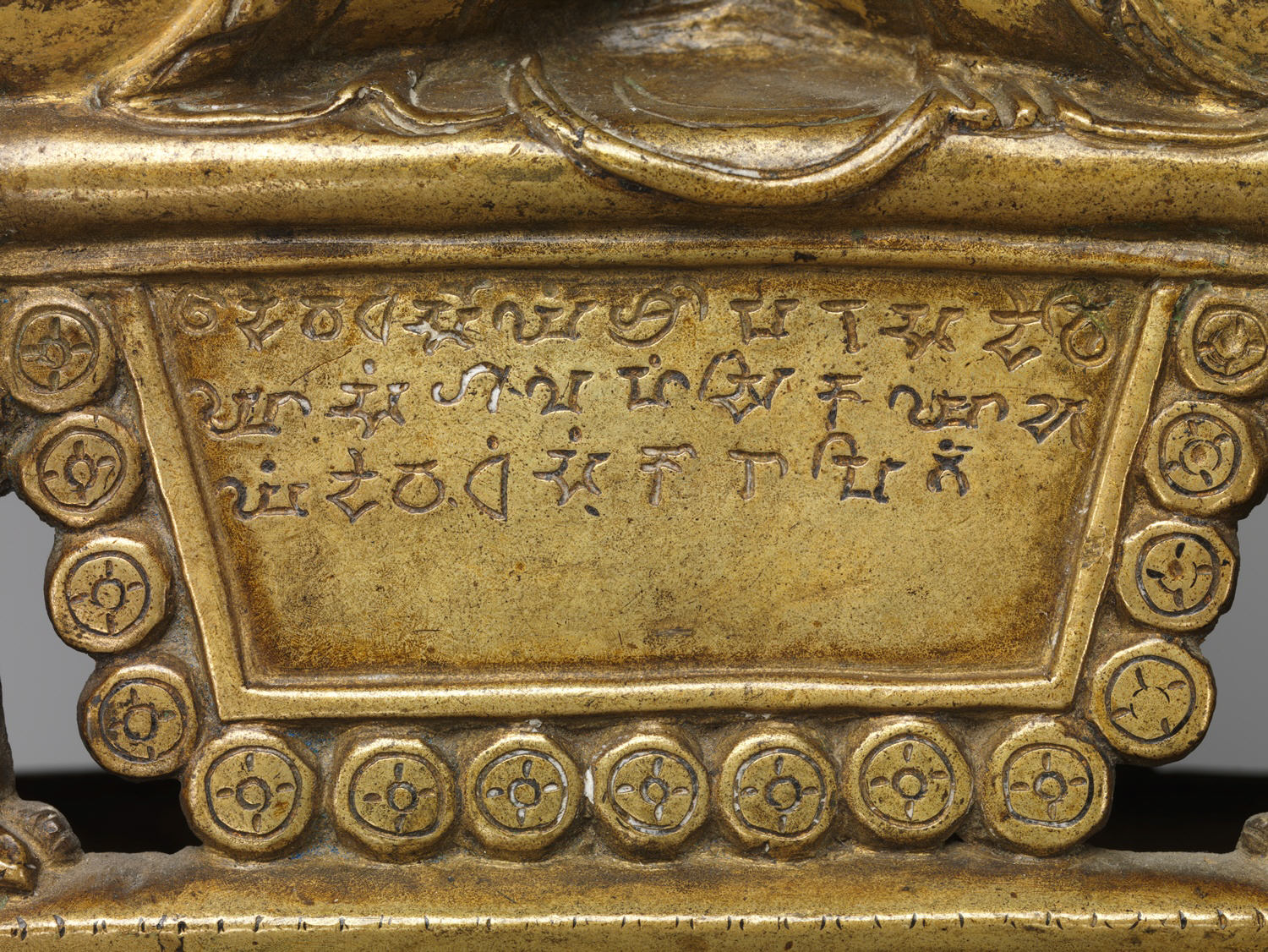
Enthroned Buddha with inscription, Gilgit Kingdom, circa 600 CE. Sanskrit inscription in the Brahmi script: “Om. This is a pious gift. This pious gift was ordered to be made by the Shri Paramadevi [Highest Queen] Mangalahamsika”.

A few Buddhist paintings from the cover of manuscripts in the Sharada script are also known from this period in Gilgit. These were the first texts known to mentions the "Patola Shahis" as participants to the donation of the painted manuscripts.

Gilgit manuscripts
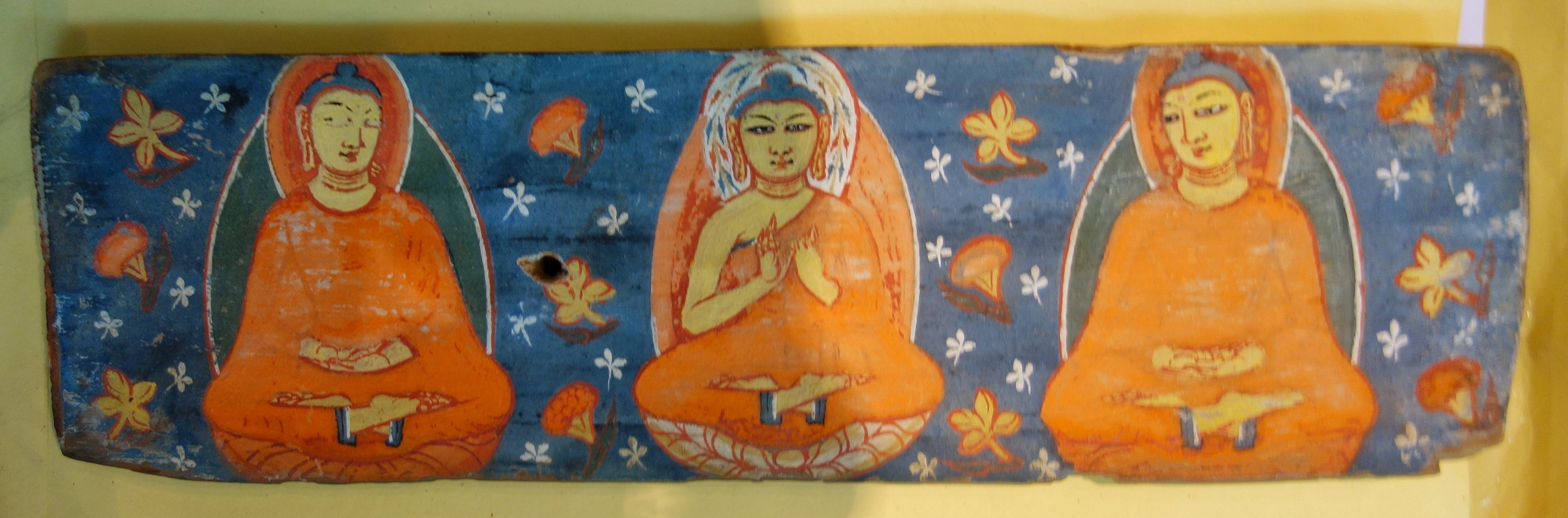
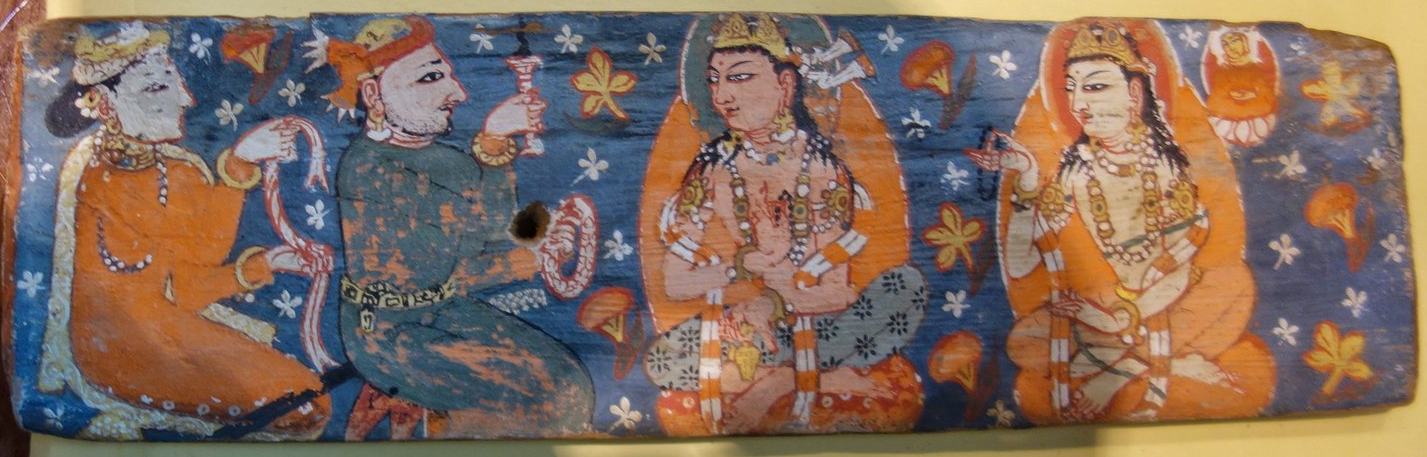
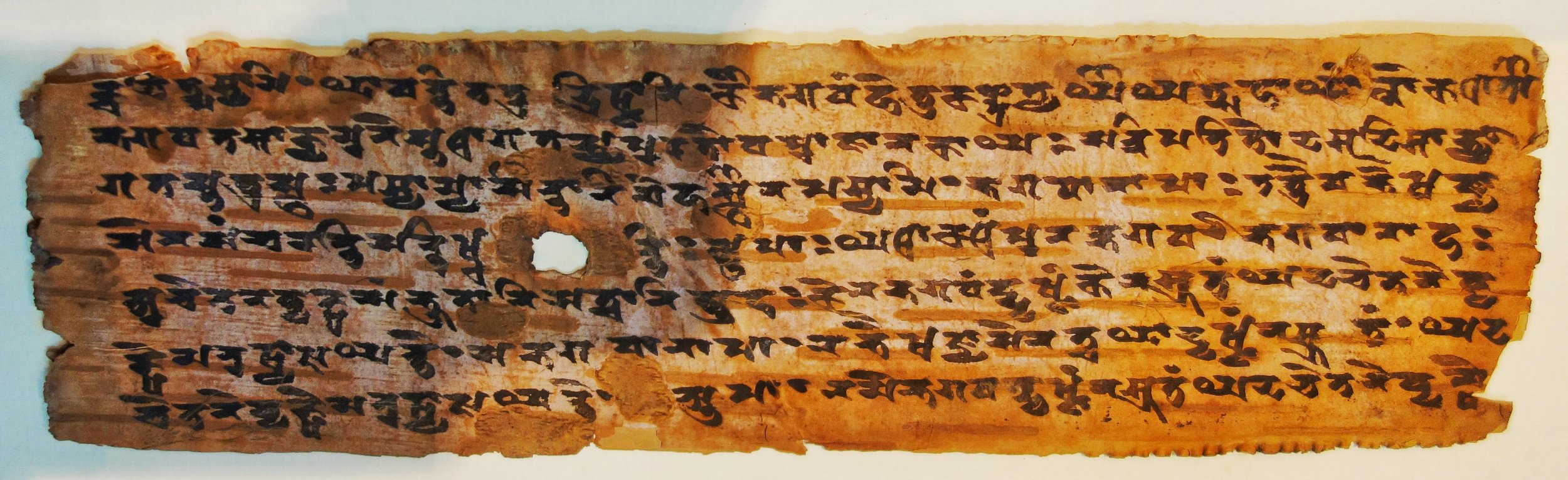
Buddhas, devotees with Buddhist deities on the painted cover from Manuscript 3, Saṃghāṭa Sūtra, with a sample page in the Sharada script, commissioned by Devaśirikā and Atthocasiṃgha, 627-628 CE. Gilgit.

Gilgit and Kashmir in this period were the seat of a major school of Buddhist art, producing ornate early medieval bronze icons, which also greatly influenced the production of metallic statues in the Swat Valley. These statues borrow their physiognomy and drapery from the earlier Art of Gandhara.

== Tang suzerainty ==
Circa 650 CE, Gilgit came under Tang suzerainty at the time the fall of Western Turkic Khaganate due to Tang military campaigns in the region.

As early as 656 the Tibetan Empire attacked the Patola Shahis southwest of the Tang protectorate. In the late 600s CE, the rising Tibetan Empire wrestled control of the region from the Tang dynasty. Faced with growing influence of the Umayyad Caliphate and then the Abbasid Caliphate to the west, the Tibetan Empire was forced to ally themselves with the Islamic caliphates. The region was then contested by Tang and Tibetan forces, and their respective vassal states, until the mid-700s.

Rulers of Gilgit formed an alliance with the Tang dynasty and held back the Arabs with their help.

Between 644 and 655, Navasurendrāditya-nandin became king of Palola Sāhi dynasty in Gilgit. Numerous Sanskrit inscriptions, including the Danyor Rock Inscriptions, were discovered to be from his reign. In the late 600s and early 700s, Jayamaṅgalavikramāditya-nandin was king of Gilgit.

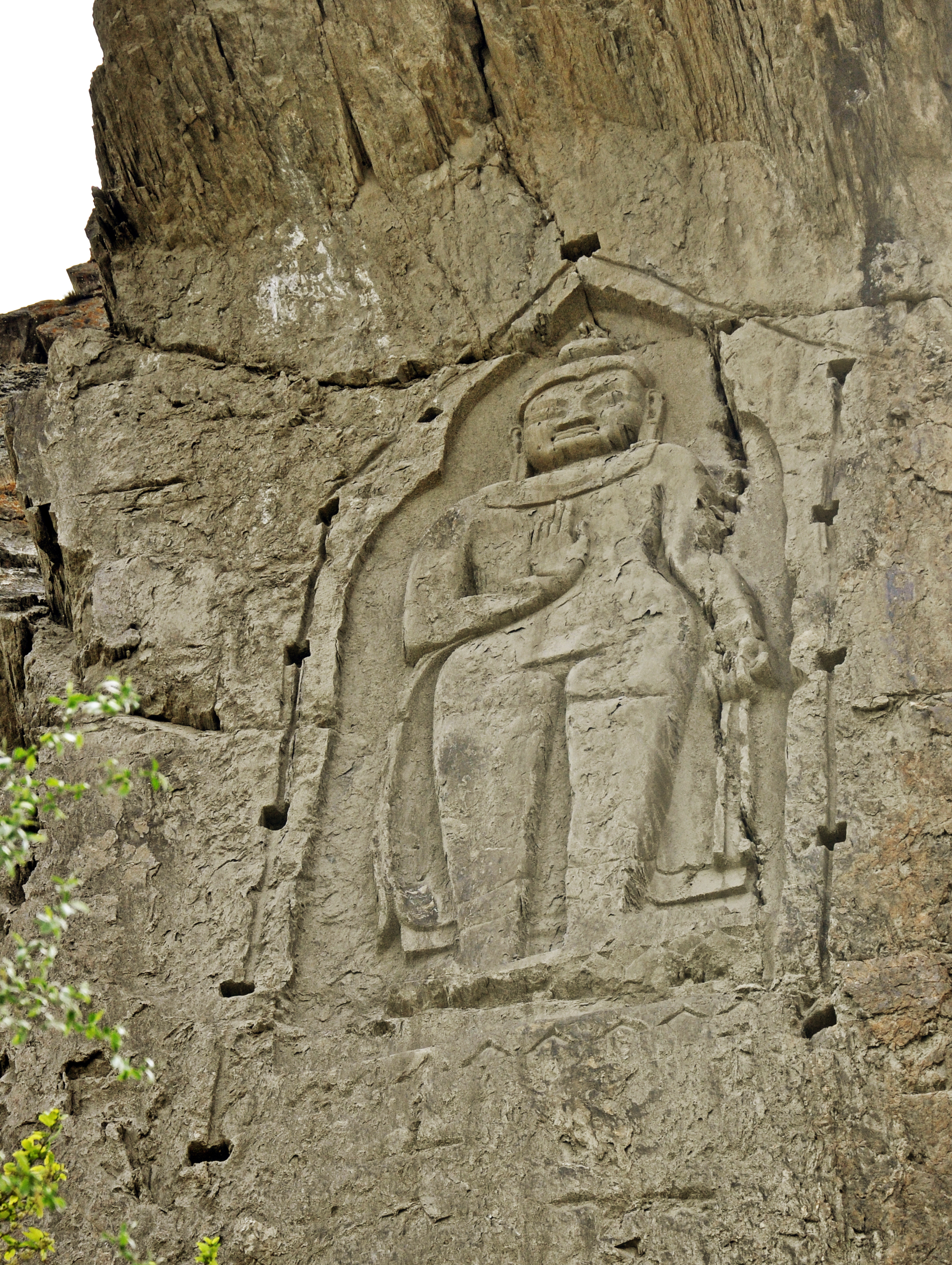
The Kargah Buddha outside of Gilgit dates from around 700 CE

According to Tang court records, in 717 and 719 respectively, delegations of a ruler of Great Palola (Baltistan) named Su-fu-she-li-ji-li-ni (Chinese: 蘇弗舍利支離泥; pinyin: sūfúshèlìzhīlíní) reached the Tang imperial court. By at least 719/720, Ladakh (Mard) became part of the Tibetan Empire. By that time, Buddhism was practiced in Baltistan, and Sanskrit was the written language. Buddhism became firmly established in the region. Great monasteries were established, with education in Sanskrit language regarding Indian religions and philosophy. Trade expanded between Ladakh and Gilgit-Baltistan. The rulers of Leh in Ladakh became increasingly influential in Balti culture and customs, and the chiefs of the region became vassals to the Ladakhis and Tibetan paramountcy.

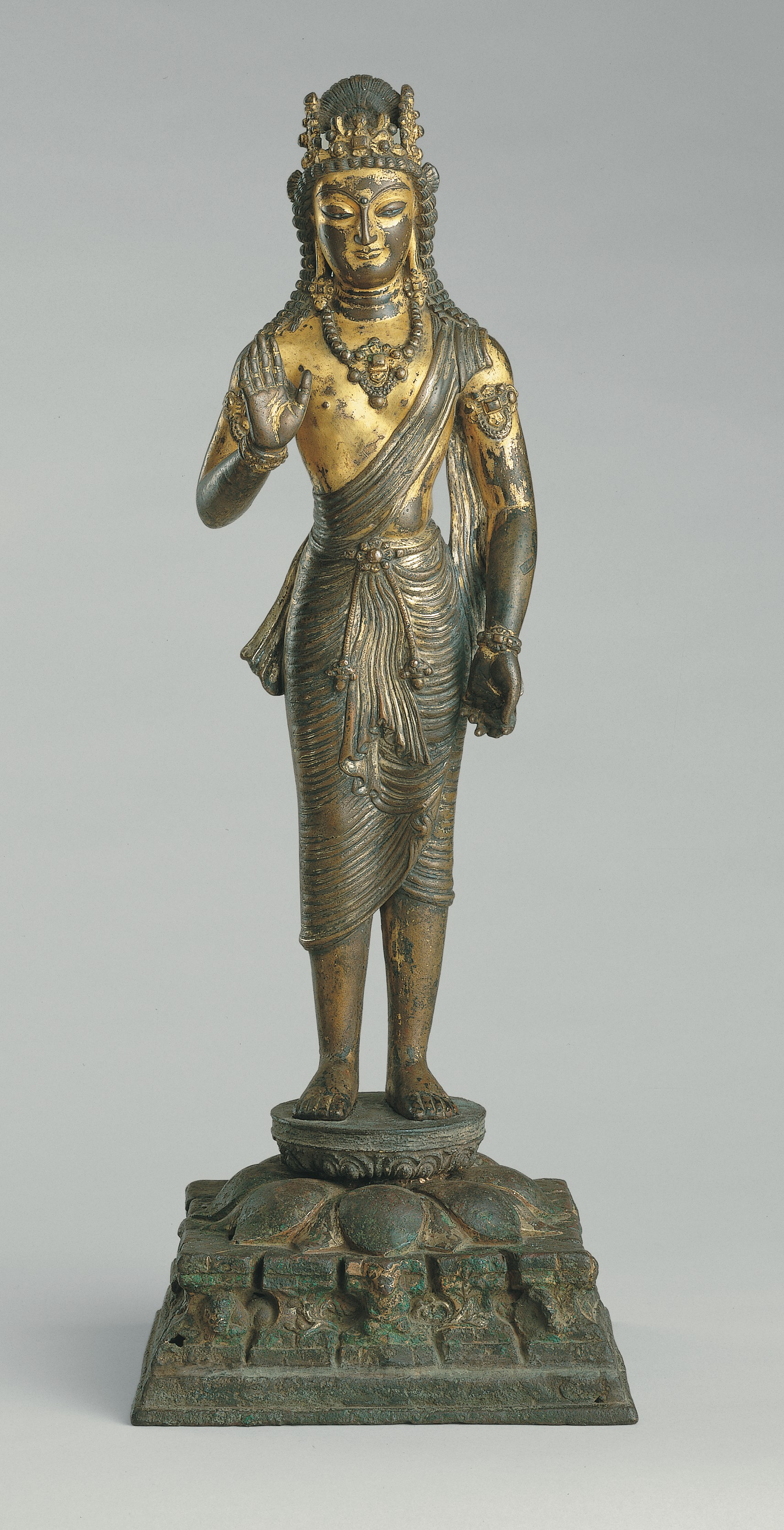
Standing ornate Maitreya, 8th century CE, Swat Valley or Gilgit region

In 720, the delegation of Surendrāditya (Chinese: 蘇麟陀逸之; pinyin: sūlíntuóyìzhī) reached the Tang imperial court. He was referred to by Tang records as the king of Great Palola; however, it is unknown if Baltistan was under Gilgit rule at the time. The Tang emperor also granted the ruler of Cashmere, Chandrāpīḍa ("Tchen-fo-lo-pi-li"), the title of "King of Cashmere". By 721/722, Baltistan had come under the influence of the Tibetan Empire.

In 721–722, the Tibetan army attempted but failed to capture Gilgit or Bruzha (Yasin valley). By this time, according to Tang records, the king of Little Palola was Mo-ching-mang (Chinese: 沒謹忙; pinyin: méijǐnmáng). He had visited Tang court requesting military assistance against the Tibetans. Between 723 and 728, the Korean Buddhist pilgrim Hyecho passed through this area. He wrote:

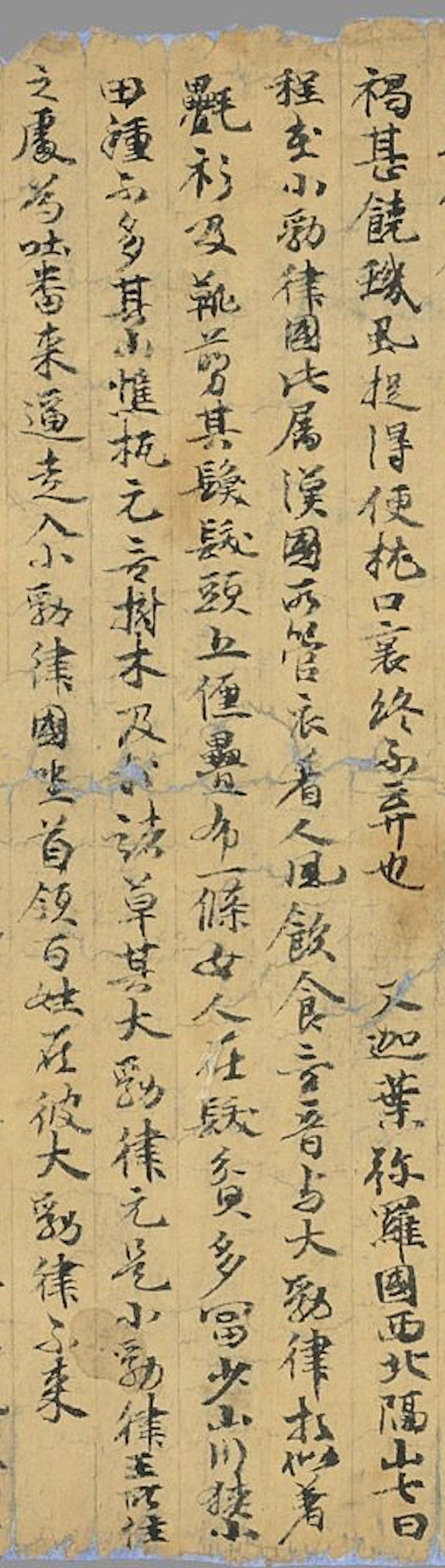
Hyecho on Lesser Bolor

"From Kashmir I travelled further west for seven days, crossed the mountains and arrived at the country of Lesser Bolor, which is under Chinese rule. The dress, customs, food and language are similar to Greater Bolor. The people wear cotton shirts and boots, cut their beards and hair, and bind their hair with a piece of cotton cloth. Women keep their hair. The poor are many and the rich are few. The valley are narrow, and cultivable land is limited. The mountains are withered and sterile, with no trees or grass. Greater Bolor was originally the place where the kings of Lesser Bolor resided. It is because the Tibetans have come that he fled and resided in Lesser Bolor. The chiefs and lesser people remained and did not come with the king."

— Account of Lesser Bolor by Hyecho, circa 725 CE.

Of Greater Bolor, which has customs similar to Lesser Bolor, Hyecho said that they followed the Three Jewels and believed in Buddhism: "There are also monasteries and monks. People respect and believe in the Three Jewels. Eastward from here is Tibet, where there are no monasteries, and people don't believe in Buddhism. Because the people in Greater Bolor are "Hu" (native/ barbarian) people, they believe in Buddhism".

Numerous ornate gilded Buddhas, often wearing elaborate crowns, are known from Gilgit at this period, which were often dedicated by local rulers. Among the dignitaries which have been recorded in these inscriptions are: Shri Surabi in 678 CE, Princess Devasri in 714 CE, King Nandivikramadityanandi in 715 CE. The figures of the kings frequently appear as donors at the base of these statues, together with identifying inscriptions.

== Tibetan suzerainty ==
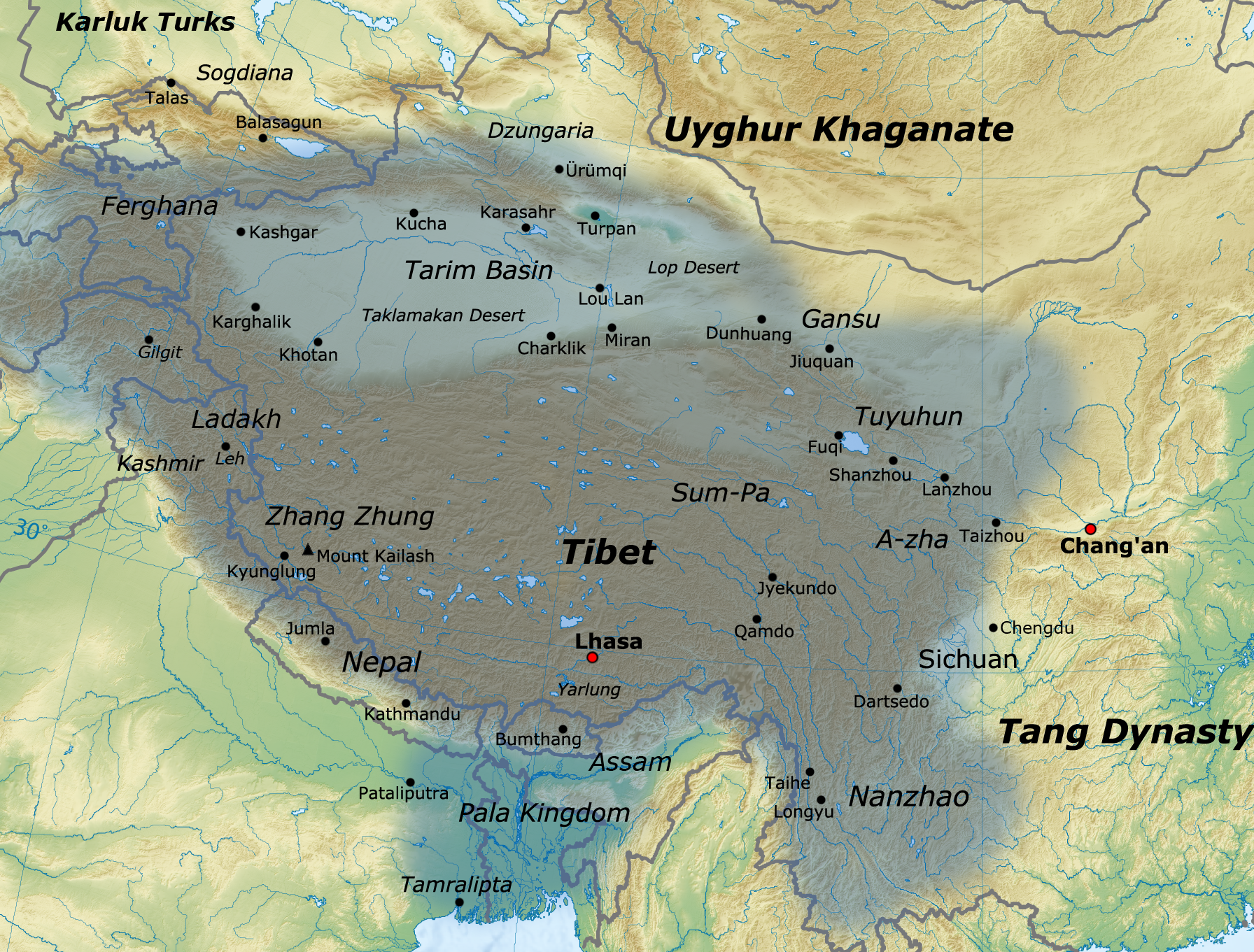
Map of Tibetan Empire citing the areas of Gilgit-Baltistan as part of its territory in 780–790 CE

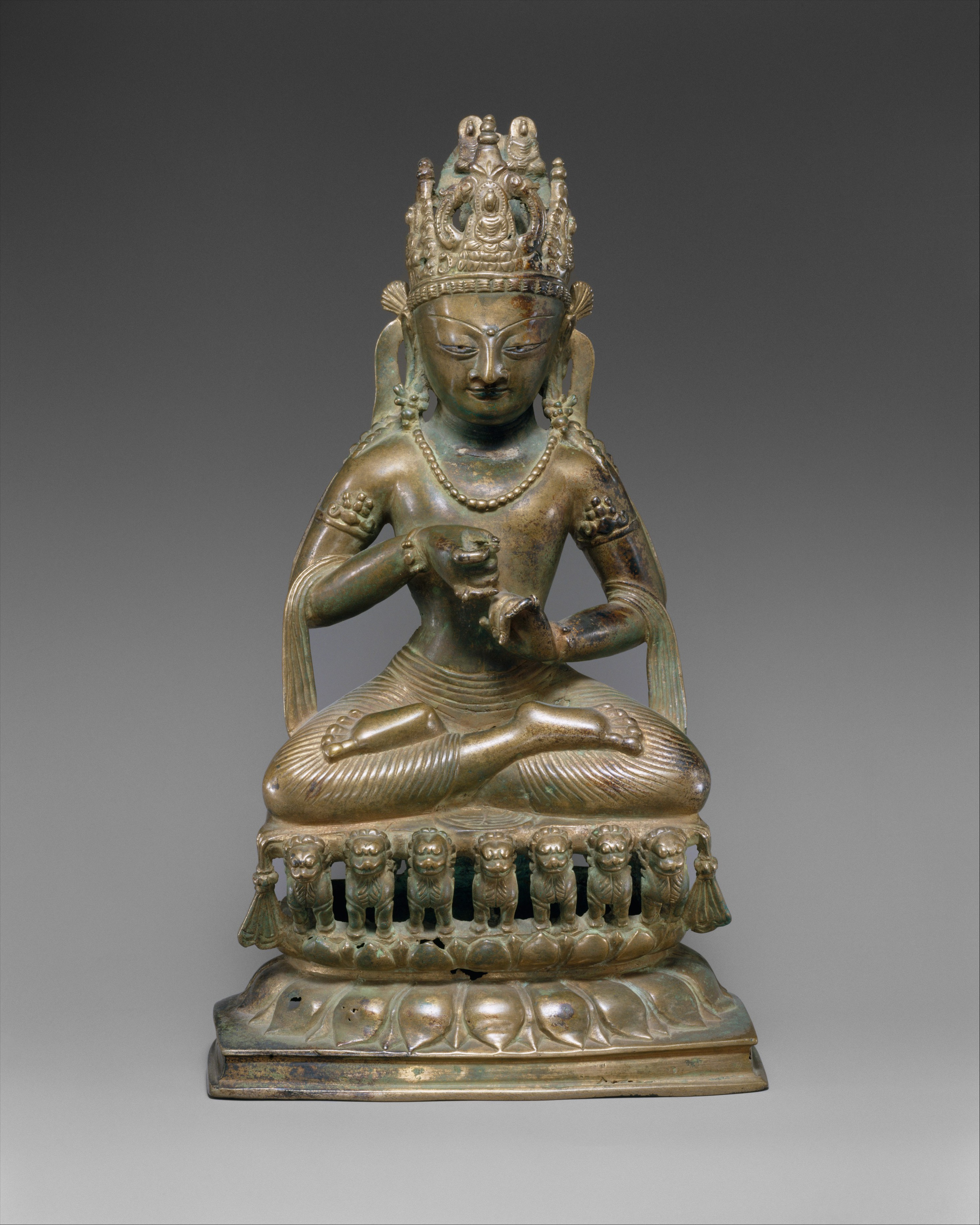
Ornate Vairochana, 9th-early 10th century CE, possibly Gilgit

In 737/738, Tibetan troops under the leadership of Minister Bel Kyesang Dongtsab of Emperor Me Agtsom took control of Little Palola. By 747, the Tang army under the leadership of Gao Xianzhi had recaptured Little Palola. The Patola Shahis were then restored on the throne for some undetermined time.

Great Palola was subsequently captured by the Tang army in 753 under the military governor Feng Changqing. However, by 755, due to the An Lushan rebellion, the Tang forces withdrew and were no longer able to exert influence in Central Asia and in the regions around Gilgit-Baltistan. The control of the region was left to the Tibetan Empire. They referred to the region as Bruzha, a toponym that is consistent with the ethnonym "Burusho" used today. Tibetan control of the region lasted until late-800s CE.

== Rulers ==
- Somana (Mid 6th century CE).
- Vajraditayanandin (585–605 CE).
- Vikramadityanandin (605–625 CE).
- Surendravikramadityanandin (625–644 or 654 CE).
- Navasurendrāditya-nandin (644 or 654–685 CE).
- Jayamaṅgalavikramāditya-nandin (685–710 CE).
- Nandivikramadityanandin (710–715 CE).
- Su-fu-che-li-chi-li-ni (name by foreign sources) (715–720 CE).
- Surendradityanandin (720–740 or 750 CE).

== Aftermath ==
Ahmad Hasan Dani noted Gilgit traditions to mention of a Trakhan Dynasty succeeding to the Patola Shahis, and ruling continuously until the 19th century. (Note: Dani entirely depends on two sources: Ḥashmatu'l-Lāh Khān's Mukhtaṣar Tārīkh-e Jammūñ va Kashmīr (1939) and Rajah Shah Raīṣ Khān's Tarikh-e-Gilgit (unpublished manuscript; 1941). The former was a Dogra official, who oversaw the administration of Gilgit-Baltistan and drafted a gazetteer of the entire region, borrowing from official documents, local clerics, epic literature, oral folklore, ruins, etc.; it did not primarily depend on previously written histories of the region. Dani found his history of Gilgit to be "very brief and faulty" with imaginary chronologies—which were even internally inconsistent—and advised caution in using the material. Despite, it has become an authoritative reference for local historians. The latter was a descendant of the Trakhan family and compiled what was essentially a family history. Dani found it to be heavily biased towards the Trakhans and severely contemptuous of neighboring powers.) Historical evidence—coins, inscriptions etc.—corroborating the narrative was absent during Dani's time and those which have been since discovered, reject such claims.
