= Keno (disambiguation) =

Keno is a lottery-like or bingo-like gambling game.

Keno may also refer to:

- Keno (name), a male name of Germanic/Frisian origin

== Places ==
- Keno, Michigan, an unincorporated community in Roscommon County, Michigan, United States
- Keno, Oregon, an unincorporated community in Klamath County, Oregon, United States
  - Keno Dam, of Lake Ewauna in Klamath County, Oregon
- Keno City, Yukon, a small community in the Yukon at the end of the Silver Trail highway
- Keno Province, an ancient region of Japan in eastern Honshu
- Keno Daas, rock carvings in Pakistan
- Ken-Ō Expressway, a partially completed toll expressway in Japan

== Other uses ==
- KENO (AM), a sports/talk AM radio station in Las Vegas, Nevada
- SS Keno, sternwheel paddle steamer that worked on the Yukon River and its tributaries, now preserved as a National Historic Site of Canada
