= Buddha Rock =

Buddha Rock (Spanish: Roca Buda) (57°4′S 26°47′W) is a rock, 35 metres (115 ft) high, lying 0.3 nautical miles (0.6 km) west of Vindication Island in the South Sandwich Islands. It was charted and named in 1930 by Discovery Investigations personnel on the RSS Discovery II.

== See also ==
- Manthal Buddha Rock
