= Noorpur Stupas =

Archaeological site in Gilgit, Pakistan

Nopurah Stupas

Religion
- Affiliation: Tibetan Buddhism

Location
- Location: Gilgit

Noorpur Stupas is an archaeological site in Gilgit, Gilgit-Baltistan, Pakistan.
