= Mughal Minar =

Archaeological site in Pakistan

Mughal Minar (stupa)
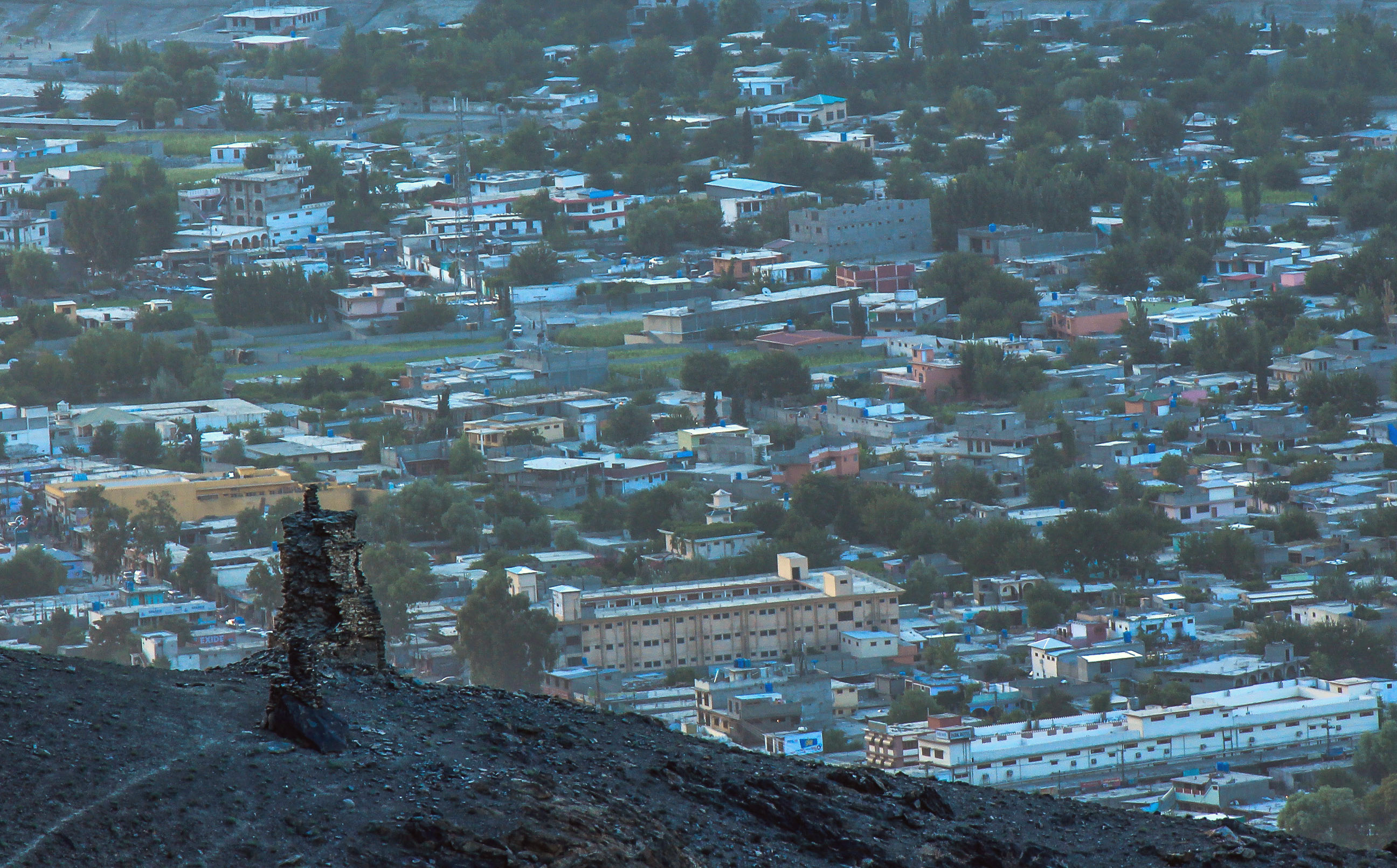

Religion
- Affiliation: Tibetan Buddhism

Location
- Location: Gilgit

Mughal Minar is an archaeological site in Gilgit, Gilgit-Baltistan, Pakistan. It previously served as a Stupa.
