= Keno (name) =

Keno is a male Germanic given name, specifically of Frisian origin. The name derives from the Old Germanic name Kuonrat, from conja meaning "bold" and rad "counsel". It is a diminutive of Konrad.

== People ==
=== Given name ===
- Keno Davis (born 1972), Central Michigan University head basketball coach
- Keno Fischer, German computer scientist
- Keno Hills (born 1973), American football tailback
- Keno Machado (born 2000), Brazilian boxer
- Keno Mason (born 1972), Trinidadian cricketer
- Don Rosa (Keno Don H. Rosa; born 1951), American comic book writer and illustrator
- Keno Wong, Bahamian politician

=== Surname ===
- Leigh and Leslie Keno (born 1957), American antique experts

=== Nickname ===
- Keno (singer) (born 1962), Filipino singer
- Keno (footballer) (born 1989), Brazilian footballer
