= Shah Rais Khan =

President of the Provisional Government of Gilgit

Raja Shah Rais Khan
- Born: 1885; Gilgit Agency, British Indian Empire
- Died: 22 January 1974
- Occupations: Political figure; Author; Military officer
- Known for: President of the Provisional Government of Gilgit; author of Tarikh-i-Gilgit
- Parent: Raja Ali Dad Khan (father)
- Relatives: Trakhan family
- Awards: Sitara-e-Quaid-e-Azam

Raja Shah Rais Khan (1885 – 22 January 1974) was a Pakistani political and military figure who served as president of the Provisional Government of Gilgit following the 1947 Gilgit rebellion. A member of the historically prominent Trakhan family, he played a leading role in the rebellion against the Dogra dynasty, subsequently acceding to Pakistan. He is also the author of Tarikh-i-Gilgit, in which he chronicled the history of Gilgit-Baltistan from the eighth century CE to 1891.

== Early life ==
Shah Rais Khan was born in 1885 into the Trakhan family of Gilgit, which had ruled the region for centuries before being displaced from power in the 1840s by the Dogra dynasty, to Raja Ali Dad Khan. After receiving his initial education at a local school in Gilgit, he joined the Revenue Department of the princely state and was posted at Bagrote. He subsequently joined the Jammu and Kashmir State Forces as a subedar. In 1925 he enlisted in the Gilgit Scouts, but resigned in 1939. In 1944 he was appointed heir-apparent to his ancestral jagir.

== 1947 Gilgit rebellion ==
Shah Rais Khan took an active interest in the local political affairs. When the rebellion broke out in the Gilgit Agency on 1 November 1947 following the news of the maharaja of Jammu and Kashmir acceding to the Dominion of India, he became one of its leading figures. Following the rebels' seizure of Gilgit, he was chosen as president of the Provisional Government of Gilgit, with Mirza Hassan Khan serving as commander-in-chief.

After a tenure of over two weeks, Shah Rais Khan sought assistance by Pakistani government to whom he dispatched the message. On 16 November 1947, administration of Gilgit was transferred to the Pakistani Political Agent. Shah Rais Khan subsequently accepted the position of Controller of Supply.

== Later life ==
Shah Rais Khan was awarded the Sitara-e-Quaid-e-Azam by President Ayub Khan in recognition of his role during the rebellion. In his seventies, he composed Tarikh-i-Gilgit (lit. History of Gilgit) in Urdu. The work was edited and translated into English by Ahmad Hasan Dani and published in 1987. Dani described it as the first complete history of the region, but criticised the work for the apparent bias on the part of Khan against the other local ruling dynasties. Shah Rais Khan died on 22 January 1974.

== See also ==
- Babar Khan
- Mata ul-Mulk
- Aslam Khan
