= Alam Bridge inscriptions =

Archaeological site in Gilgit, Pakistan

Alam Bridge
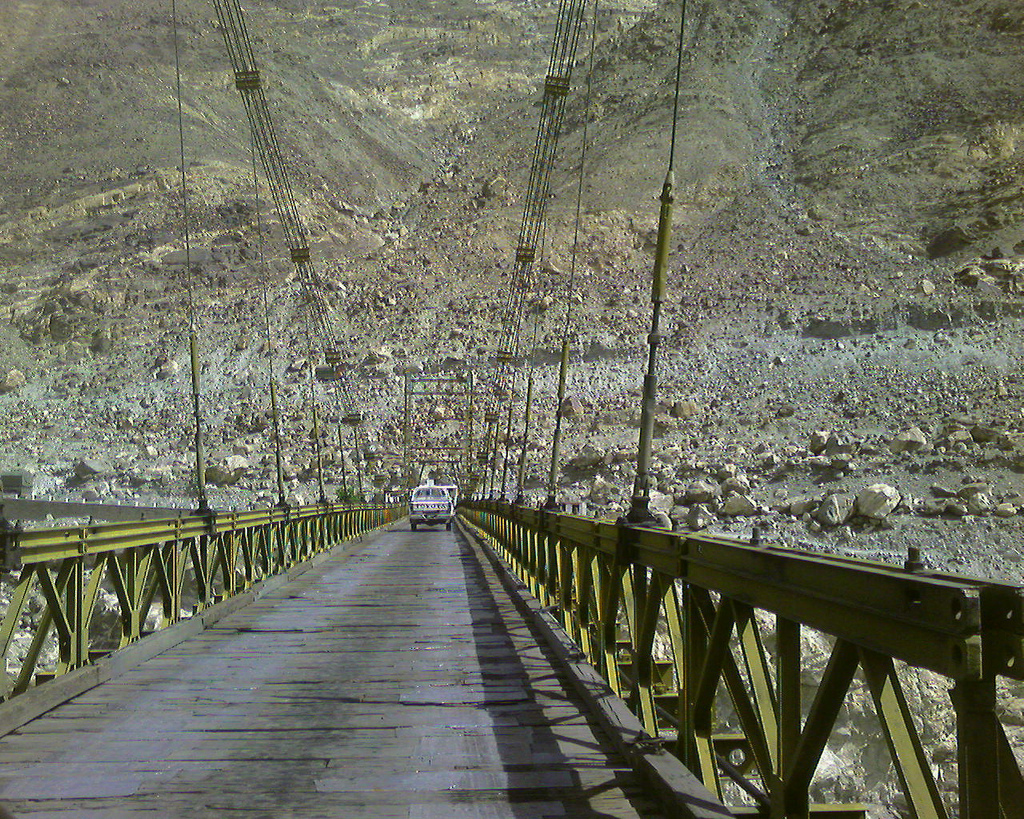

- Location within Pakistan
- 35°45′29.7″N 74°35′49.23″E
- Location: Gilgit, Gilgit-Baltistan, Pakistan

Alam Bridge inscriptions refers to the archaeological inscriptions on the rocks, near the Alam Bridge. The inscriptions are in Kharoshti and Brahmi script, and are mostly animal carvings and Stupas.
