= Shatial =

Archaeological site in Gilgit-Baltistan, Pakistan

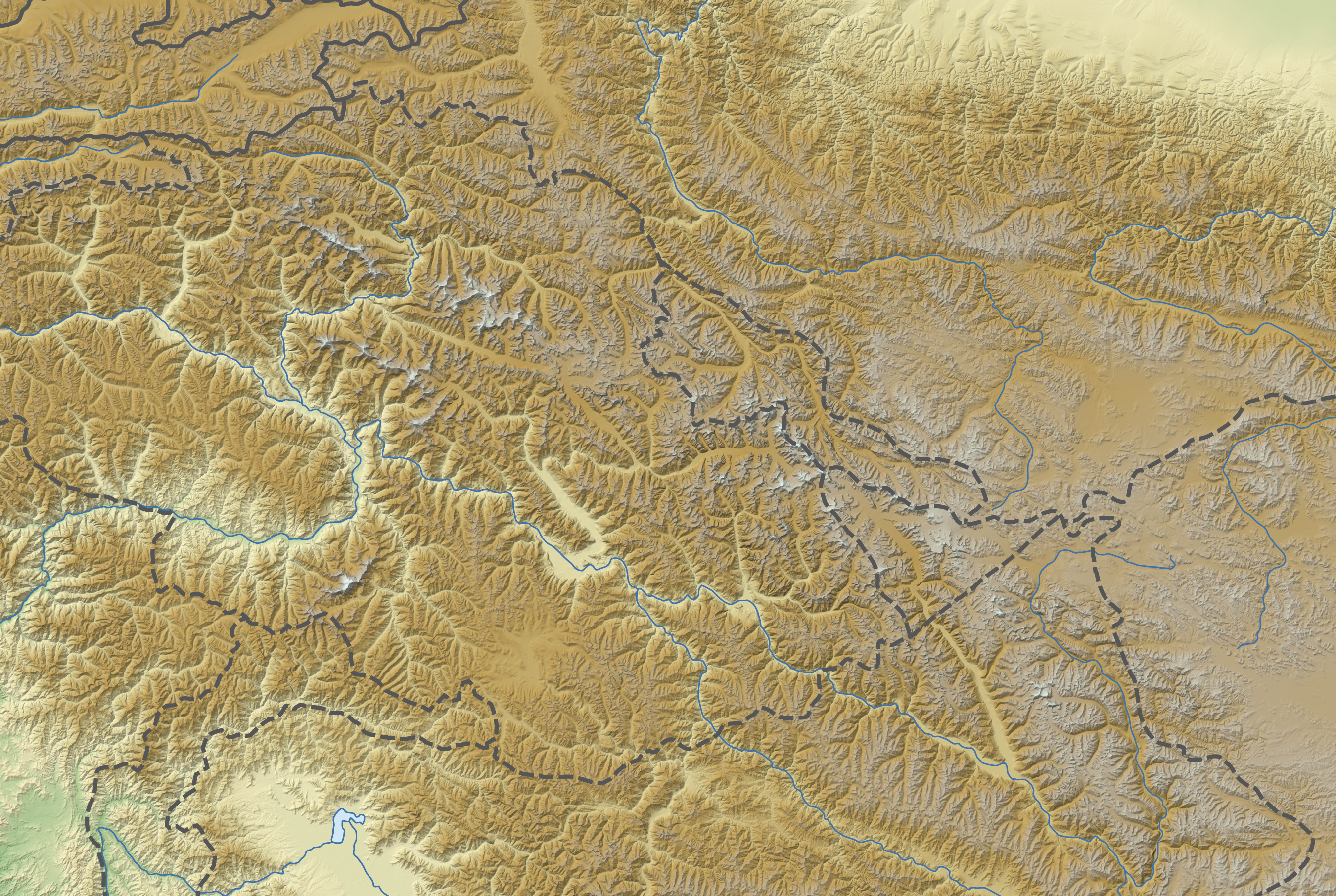
- Location within South Asia Location within Karakoram
- 35°31′37″N 73°32′36″E
- Location: Gilgit-Baltistan, Pakistan

Shatial is a transit station with archaeological significance on Karakoram Highway in Gilgit-Baltistan region of northern Pakistan.

== Location ==
Shatial is an important transit station consisting mainly of shops, rest places, and sarais. It is located 60 kilometres (37 mi) west of Chilas in the upper Indus Valley beside the Indus River in Gilgit-Baltistan. Historically it acted as a junction of old routes and byways connecting Swat Valley, Gilgit, Chilas, and Chitral.

== Archaeological sites ==
As a historical crossroads, many traders, Buddhist missionaries, Sogdian merchants, and pilgrims passed through Shatial leaving behind graffiti and inscriptions on the rocks. More than 1000 inscriptions and 700 petroglyphs can be found at the Shatial bridge on the Indus River. Iranian merchants left behind over 550 inscriptions dating from third to seventh centuries in the Sogdian language, nine in the extinct Bactrian language, and two in Middle Persian and Parthian each. Many of these inscriptions are short, consisting of just the names of the travelers, though in some cases names of two or more family members are also mentioned. Many inscriptions also mention a date, possibly of arrival, but it is unknown whether this refers to the date or year of journey. Nanaivandak, a famous merchant from Samarkand who is a subject in Susan Whitfield's book Life Along the Silk Road, wrote the longest such inscription reading:

Nanai-vandak, the (son of) Narisaf, came on (here) the tenth and have requested the favor from the soul of the holy place Kart (that) I reach Kharvandan very fast and see (my) dear brother in good (health).

These Iranian inscriptions are significant in providing insight on the naming traditions of Sogdians of the time as some of these are theophoric referring to Zoroastrian and other deities. Though these inscriptions do not establish an exact date or period, it is believed that most of them belong to the Sasanian period (224–651 AD).

Scripts and graffiti in ancient Brahmi and Kharosthi languages are found on the rocks revealing that the place also served as a Buddhist shrine. The Buddhist travelers venerated these inscriptions and artwork, particularly a large triptych with drawings of a stupa and Sibi Jataka.
