= Manthal Buddha Rock =

Engraved rock in Skardu, Pakistan

Coordinates: 35.2685295°N 75.6336372°E

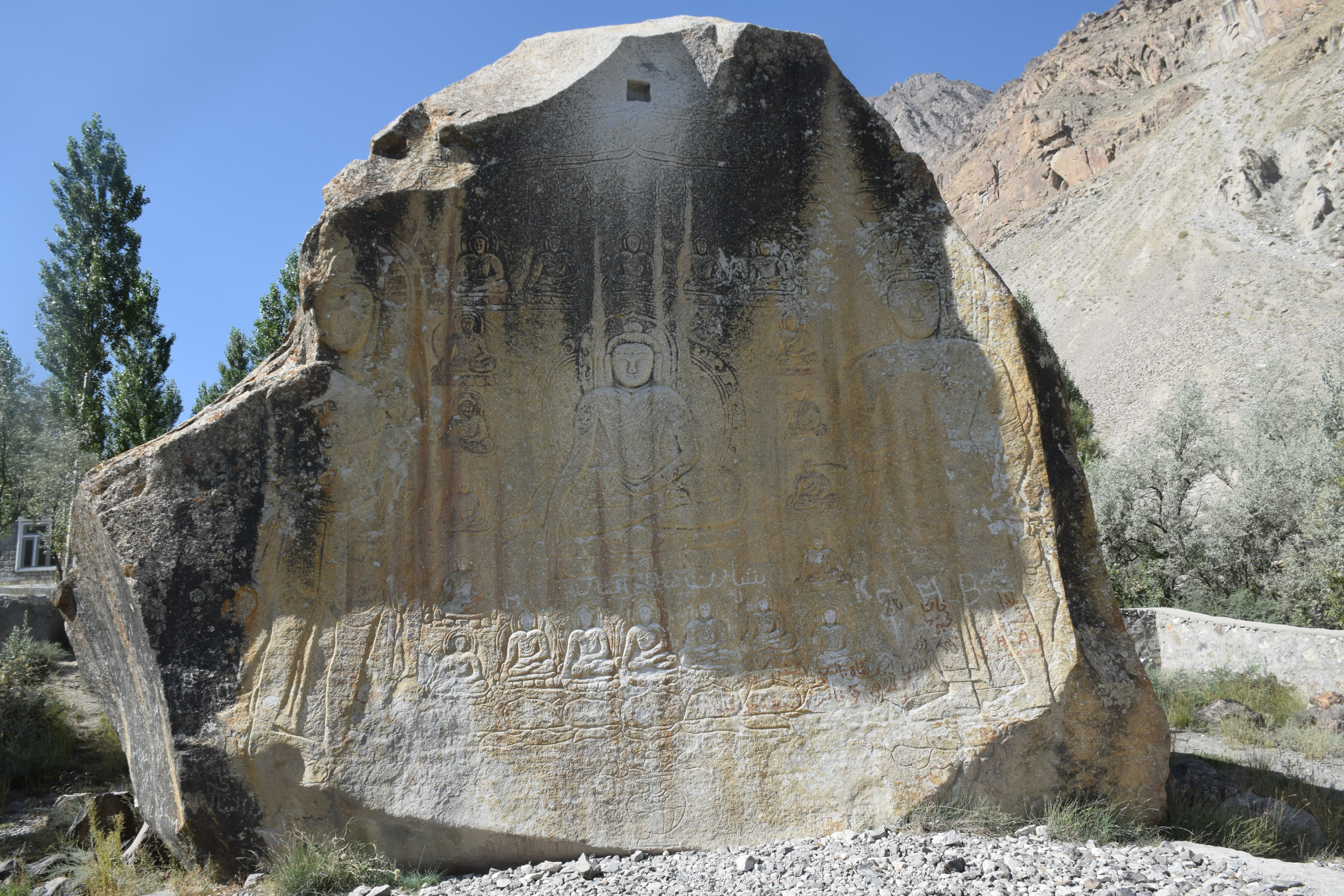

Manthal Buddha Rock ('Dray chatfi Fong' in local Balti language) is a large granite rock with a relief sculpture of Buddha, which probably dates back to the 8th century. This rock is located in Manthal village in Skardu, in Pakistan. Buddha Rock is one of the most important relics of Buddhism in Skardu. It is about 3 km from the Sadpara Road that leads to Satpara Lake.

== History ==
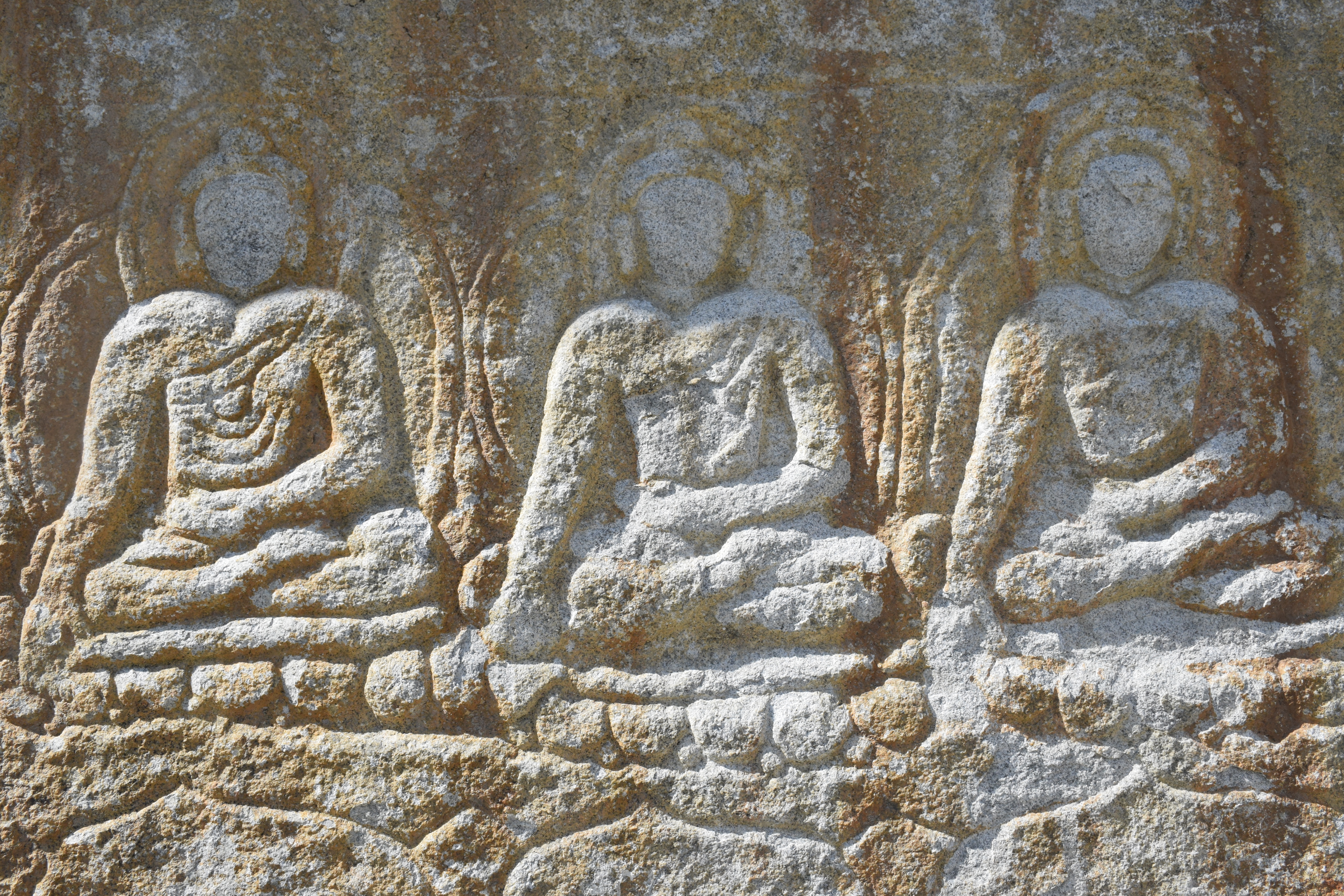

Before the arrival of Islam in the region of Gilgit-Baltistan, the majority of people were Buddhist and they sculpted Buddha images on many rocks. This Buddha carving was not known to the world until the beginning of the 20th century due to its remote location. In 1906 the Scottish traveller Ella Christie wrote a book on her journey to Western Tibet and featured the carving in her book which gave it international attention. Since then the government has taken many steps to preserve this monument and it is visited by tourists who visit Skardu.

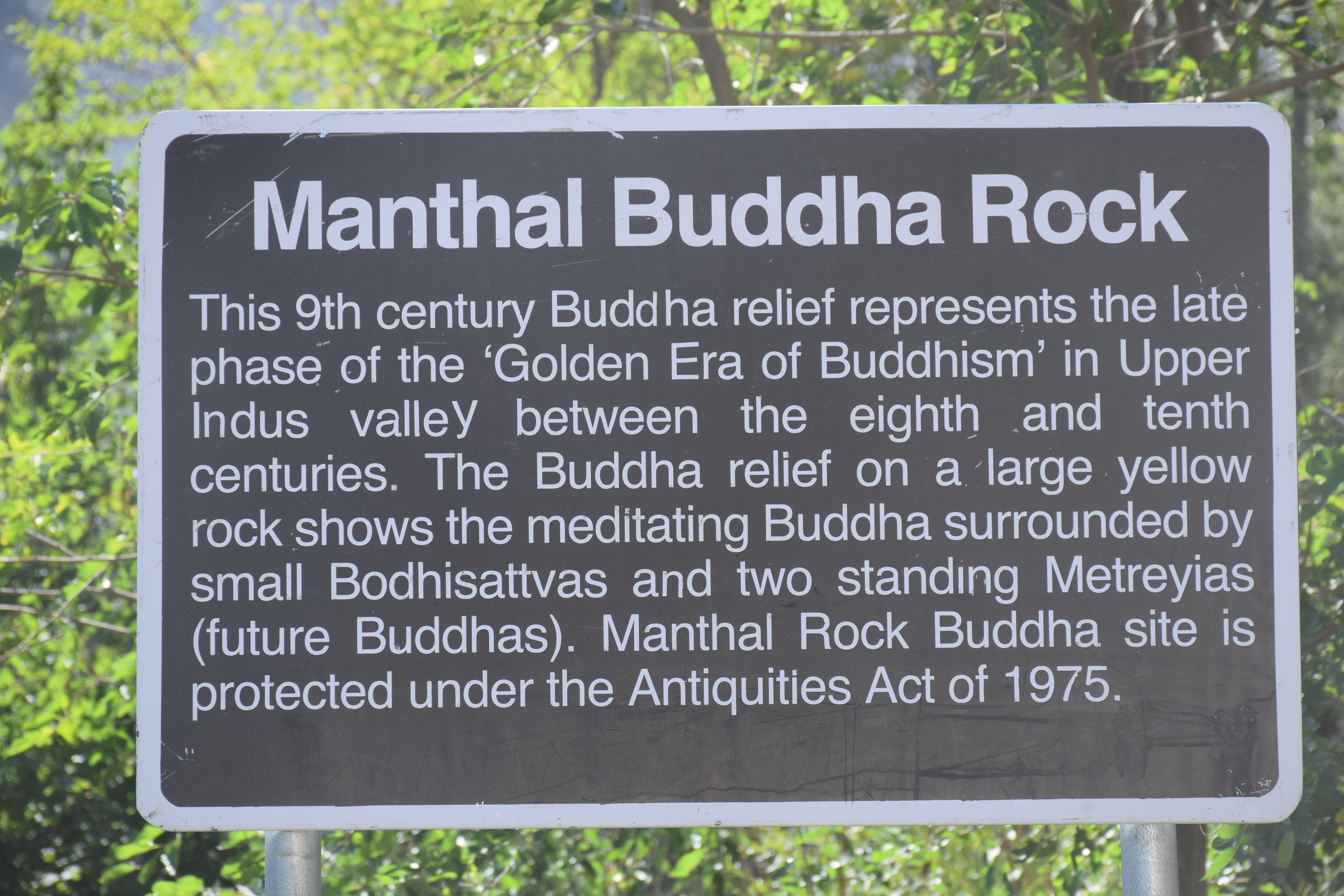
Information board

The Pakistani government has recently been attempting to promote religious travel. In order to inform the global Buddhist community, these sacred sites are being recognised in national forums.

== See also ==
- Kargah Buddha
