= Keno Daas (rock carvings) =

Archaeological site in Gilgit District, Pakistan

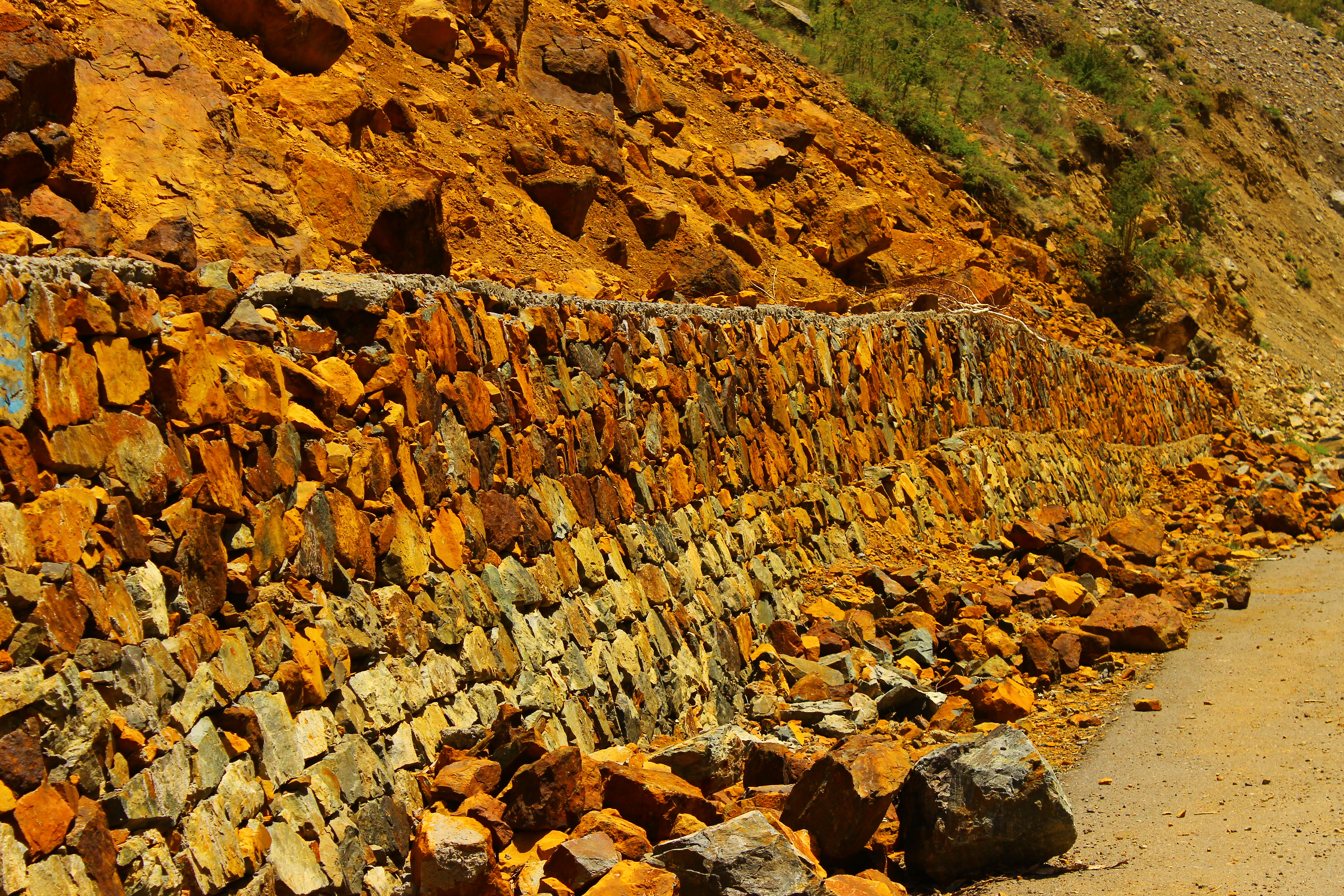
- Keno Daas
- Location: Gilgit, Gilgit-Baltistan

Keno Daas (rock carvings) is an archaeological site in Gilgit, Gilgit-Baltistan, Pakistan. These are the important rock carvings, and are located just outside Gilgit, towards Hunza Valley.
