= Danyor Rock Inscriptions =

Archaeological site in Danyor, Pakistan

Danyore Rock Inscriptions
- Type: Inscriptions
- Periods: 7-8th century AD during the reign of Navasurendrādityanandi
- Cultures: Buddhist culture
- Location: Danyor
- Region: Gilgit-Baltistan, Pakistan

Danyor Rock Inscriptions is an archaeological site in Danyor, in Gilgit-Baltistan, Pakistan. It is a gigantic boulder bearing inscriptions from the 7th and 8th centuries A.D.

== Location ==
The site is located on the left bank of the Gilgit River along the Karakoram Highway in Danyor.

== Protection ==
The site is protected under the Pakistan Antiquities Act.
