= Kargah Buddha =

Archaeological site in Pakistan

- کارگاہ بدھ (Urdu)
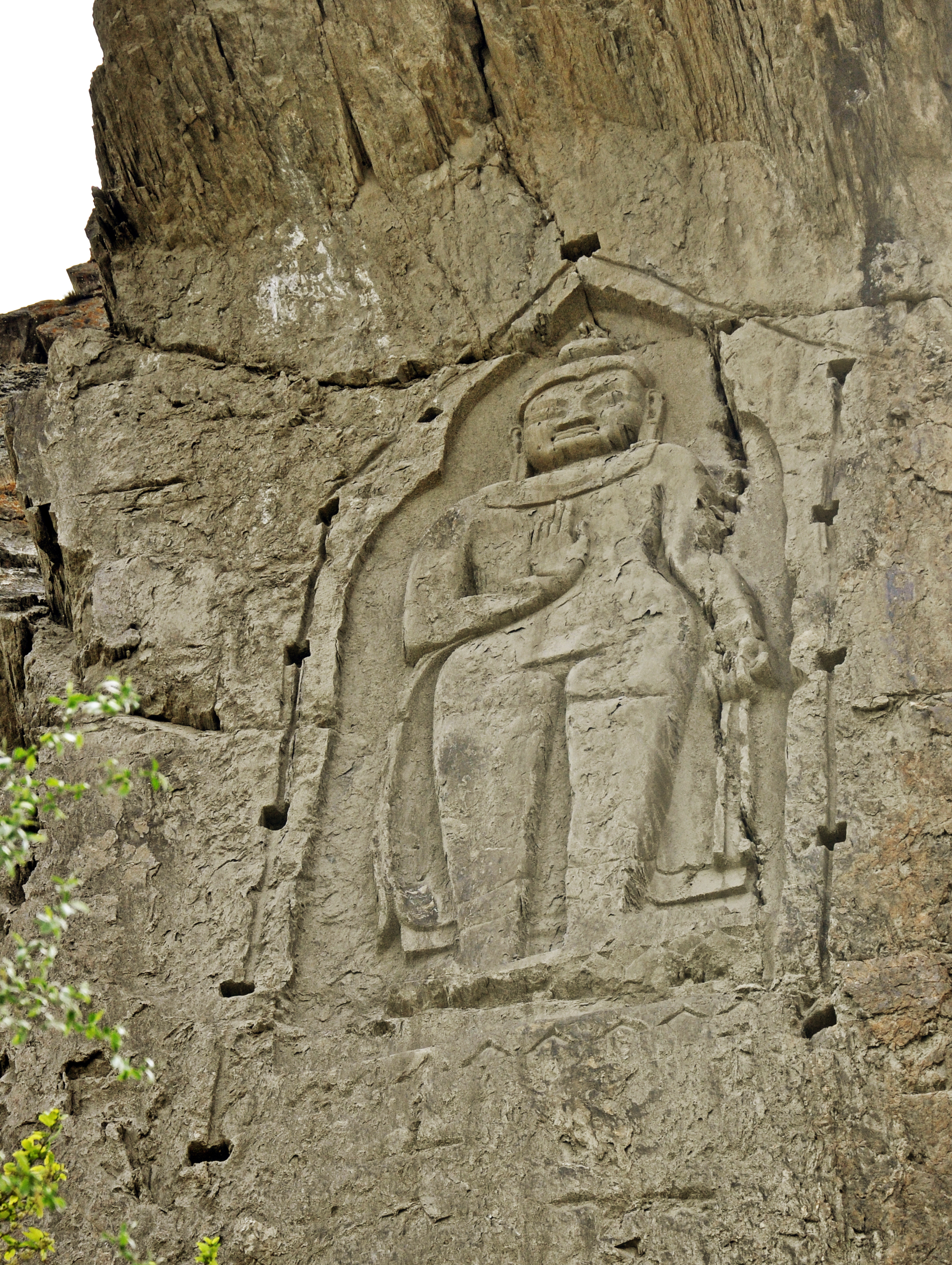
- Carved image of Buddha
- Interactive map of Kargah Buddha
- Cultures: Buddhism
- Location: Gilgit, Pakistan
- Region: (Gilgit-Baltistan) File:Flag of Gilgit Baltistan (2011-Present).png Gilgit−Baltistan

Site notes
- Height: 50 ft (15 m)
- Condition: Intact
- Owner: Pakistan Ministry of Tourism
- Public access: Open
- Website: www.gilgit.gov.pk

Kargah Buddha (Urdu: کارگاہ بدھ; Shina: Yʂhani یݜنی) is an archaeological site located about 6 miles (9.7 km) outside of Gilgit, Gilgit−Baltistan, Pakistan. It is a carved image of a large standing Buddha, some 50 ft (15 m) high, in the cliff-face in Kargah Nala. The carving, which is in a style also found in Baltistan, is estimated to date back to the 7th century.

The image is surrounded by the holes for a wooden house structure, which would have sheltered it from inclement weather.

== Location and history ==
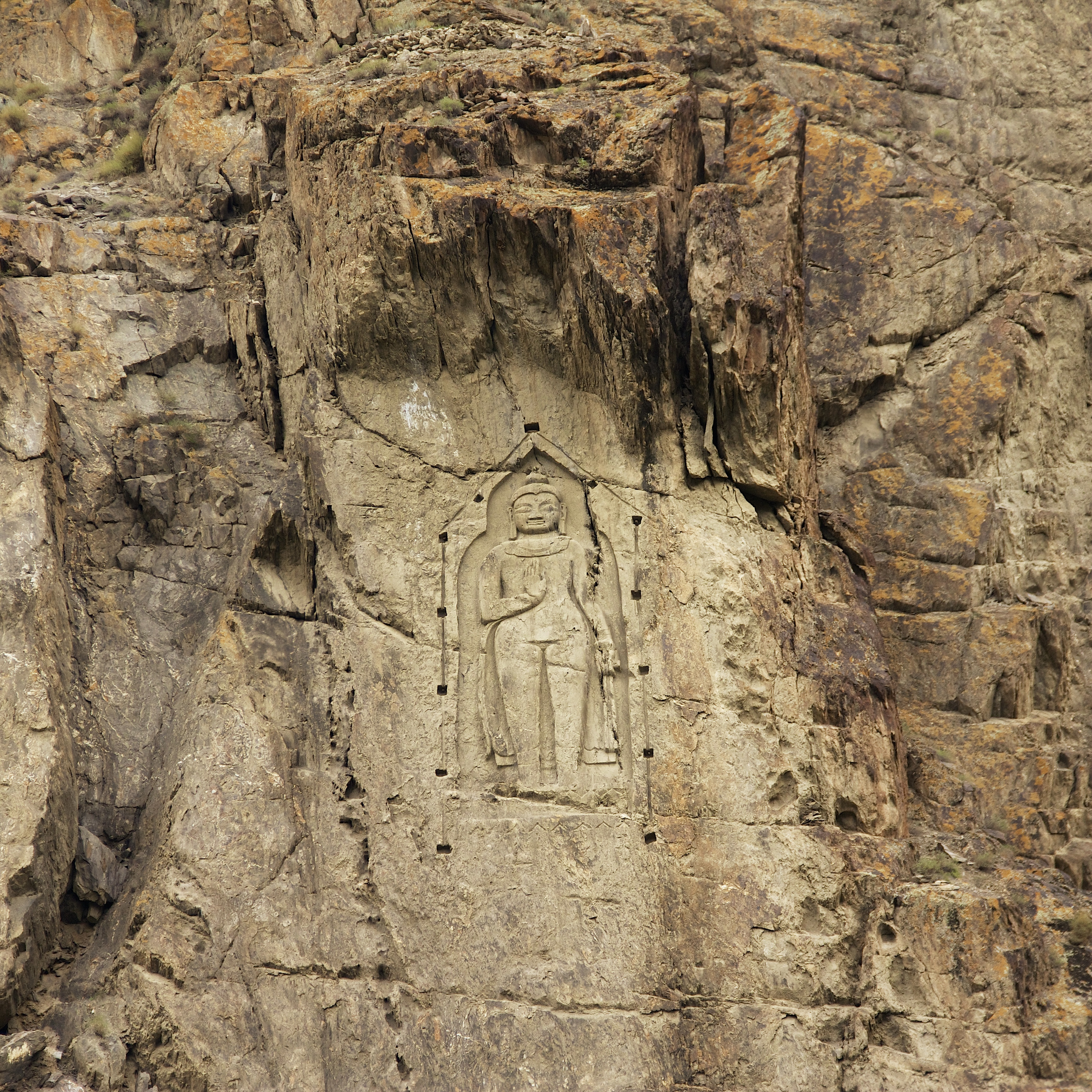
The Buddha is carved into the face of a cliff

Kargah Buddha is located at the junction of two streams, the Kargah and Shukogah, about 6 miles (9.7 km) west of the city of Gilgit. Nearby locales include, Napur, and the Rakaposhi mountain.

From the 3rd century to the 11th century, Gilgit was a prominent centre of early Buddhism. During this time period, multiple powers vied for control of the region, Tibetan Empire, the Kashmiri Karkota Dynasty, and the Umayyad and Abbasid caliphates. Nearby, about 400 metres (1,300 ft) upstream, a Buddhist monastery and three stupas containing Sanskrit manuscripts were excavated in 1931. By the 11th century, Gilgit had grown into the autonomous of Kamboja kingdom before largely adopting Islam.

== Carving excavation and legends ==
It is estimated that the carving was completed in the 7th century. It was discovered in 1938–39, following the innovation of supposed Gilgit manuscripts in 1931.

According to local legend, the figure is actually a man-eating giantess or witch (yakshini or ya-shaani or yacheni) who terrorized the local residents and was ultimately pinned to the cliff by a pir (holy man) as punishment.
