= 1852 Gilgit rebellion =

| Date | Winter 1851 – Summer 1852 |
| Location | Gilgit (present-day Gilgit-Baltistan) |
| Result | Rebellion victory: Dogras are expelled beyond the east bank of Indus River; Gohar Aman becomes the ruler of Gilgit |

Belligerents
| Chilasis; Yasinis; Hunzakut; Gilgitis | Jammu and Kashmir State Forces |

Commanders and leaders
| Gohar Aman; Ghazan Khan | Diwan Hari Chand; Wazir Zorawar of Kishtwar; Col. Bijay Singh; Col. Jawahir Singh; Lochan Singh; Diwan Thaker Dass; Thanedar Sant Singh; Bhup Singh Bhadwal; Ram Din |

Strength
| Unknown | Total: over 11,500: 10,000 under Diwan Hari Chand; 1,200 under Bhup Singh Bhadwal; 300 at Naupura; Unknown at Gilgit |

Casualties and losses
| Unknown | More than 3,100 killed More than 300 POWs |

The 1852 Gilgit rebellion was a mass rebellion in the areas of Chilas, Gilgit, Yasin, Bunji and Hunza against the newly established Dogra dynasty of princely state of Jammu and Kashmir, in the present-day Gilgit-Baltistan region of Pakistan.

It resulted in the expulsion of Dogras from the territory which later came to be known as Gilgit Agency, and a victory for Gohar Aman, the leader of rebellion, who ruled Gilgit until his death in 1860.

== Background ==
In the early 19th century, Gilgit was divided into a number of small principalities and tribal clans. Notable among them were Hunza, Nagar, Yasin, Gilgit and Punial. In 1842, a Sikh army invaded and annexed Gilgit, which became part of princely state of Jammu and Kashmir following its establishment in 1846 under British suzerainty. The people of Gilgit disliked the introduction of taxes and oppressive measures imposed by Dogras, notably the practice of begar to construct roads and forts. During this period, there were three Kashmir garrisons stationed at Gilgit, Bunji and Naupura, commanded by Thanedar Sant Singh, Bhup Singh Bhadwal and Ram Din, respectively.

== Rebellion ==
=== Revolt at Chilas ===
In the winter of 1851, the people of Chilas rose in revolt and expelled Dogras. Due to winter maharajaGulab Singh of Kashmir could not take measures against them but in spring next year, he dispatched a large army of over 10,000 soldiers under Diwan Hari Chand, Wazir Zorawar of Kishtwar, Col. Bijay Singh, Col. Jawahir Singh, Lochan Singh and Diwan Thaker Dass. They besieged the Chilas fort but could not take it by storm. In the next few months Kashmir forces lost over 1500 soldiers and Colonel Bijay Singh was himself injured. Ultimately, when the Chilasis ran out of food and water, they surrendered. Most of the people inside the fort were killed, with rest taken as prisoners to Srinagar. The fort of Chilas was raised to ground.

=== Battle at Bhup Singh ki Pari ===
When the news of Chilas rebellion reached Gilgit Sant Singh and Ram Din took repressive measures to quell potential uprising. This prompted several of the Gilgitis to invite Gohar Aman. In summer 1852, Gohar Aman allied with Mir of Hunza and invaded Gilgit Valley. He besieged the two forts of Naupura and Gilgit. Bhup Singh who was the commander of Dogra garrison at Astore and Bunji, advanced with 1200 soldiers for their help. At a narrow section of the valley now known as Bhup Singh ki Pari he was surrounded by Yasin and Hunza forces. After a week under siege Dogras were attacked by Gohar Aman and in the ensuing battle, more than 1,000 soldiers were killed while rest were taken as prisoners.

=== Fall of Naupura ===
Naupura was garrisoned by mainly Gurkha mercenaries. During the battle, about three hundred soldiers from Gilgit fort tried to reach Naupura where the condition was critical. However most were killed in the way, with only a few managing to reach into the fort. When siege continued for a longer time, the garrison came out and in an open battle another three hundred of Kashmir soldiers were killed and Naupura was taken.

=== Fall of Gilgit ===
Like Naupura, Gilgit was also mainly garrisoned by Gurkhas under Thanedar Sant Singh. After a prolonged siege, Gilgit was taken by Gohar Aman, following most were killed except for a Gurkha woman who managed to jump into Indus River and swim towards Astore, reaching Gilgit.

== Aftermath ==
Following these disastrous defeats Gulab Singh abandoned any efforts to reclaim areas beyond the east bank of Indus. Gohar Aman became the undisputed ruler of the valleys of Yasin, Ghizer, Mastuj, Darel, Tangir, Gilgit and Punial, ruling Gilgit from 1852 until his death in 1860. Shortly after his death Dogras recaptured Gilgit from his son. In 1863 they invaded and massacred the people of Yasin.
