= Slavery in Pakistan =

Slavery is illegal in Pakistan, but about two million people are in bonded labour. The country has also reported cases of forced marriage and human trafficking.

== History ==
Like most parts of Asia, slavery as an institute continued to exist in what is today Pakistan until the 19th-century. In the early 11th century, the armies of Mahmud of Ghazni conquered Peshawar and Waihand (the capital city of Gandhara) after the Battle of Peshawar in 1001, and made some 100,000 people as slaves, according to Tarikh al-Yamini of the Arab historian al-Utbi. During the Mughal period, the Gakhars of Punjab acted as intermediaries in slave trade to Central Asian buyers in return of war horses, on which Mughal mansabdari system was dependent. Siddis are an African origin community in southern Pakistan whose Bantu ancestors were brought as slaves during the Indian Ocean slave trade.

=== Central Asian slave trade ===
The northern mountainous states of Chitral and Hunza continued to be heavily involved in the Bukhara slave trade until the last decade of 19th-century. Due to scarce resources, the slave trade became a lucrative business for these states. The slavery appears to have been introduced in Chitral in the 16th-century, with the establishment of Rais dynasty. The Chitrali rulers (known as mehtars) were themselves involved in enslaving their people and selling them to Turkestan, Yarkand and Badakhshan. The mehtar had the authority to arbitrarily confiscate property of peasants and sell them as slaves. Slave trade was state sponsored, and was overseen by an official known as Duwanbegi. Non-Muslims like Kalash and Kafirs were worst affected, but also the adherents of sects like Isma'ilis and Shi'as as the ruling dynasty was Sunni. Criminals, indebted and war prisoners were usually punished by being enslaved. At its peak, it is estimated over 500 slaves were annually exported by Chitral in the late 19th century. The Chitrali slaves were in demand in Turkestan and Afghanistan due to their attributed qualities of loyalty and beauty.

The wars of Chitral with neighbouring polities of Badakhshan and Wakhan also generated thousands of slaves. In the second half of 18th-century, Jahan Khan, the ruler of Wakhan invaded Chitral and enslaved many Chitralis to send them to the ruler of Badakhshan as tribute. To avenge, Mehtar Muhtaram Shah Kator II invaded Wakhan, destroyed the villages and took hundreds of people as slaves, along with several Wakhi women as concubines. In an 1868 battle, Chitralis enslaved sixty Badakhshani men, while in another conflict with the Afghan chief of Asmar, an additional 170 people were taken as slaves. In some cases, slaves were gifted by mehtars to neighbouring rulers as a part of diplomacy. Slavery was banned by British in Chitral after the Chitral Expedition in 1895, but domestic slavery continued to exist until being outlawed by Pakistani government in 1960s and 1970s.

Like Chitral, the people of Hunza (known as Kanjutis) were also infamous for raiding caravans coming from Chinese Turkestan to Kashmir and enslaving the prisoners, who were sold in Central Asia. Kanjutis ambushed caravans crossing the passes between Leh and Yarkand, and also enslaved their Kyrgyz neighbours. Balti coolies and porters were also badly affected by their raids and were enslaved. Kanjutis sold the slaves in Badakhshan, from where Badakhshani traders carried them to Kashgar and Yarkand.

The conflicts of Gohar Aman, the Khushwaqt raja of Yasin, with the Dogras took a toll over population of Gilgit both due to war and enslavement. Gohar Aman got the epithet of Adam Farosh (lit. man-seller) due to the large number of people he sold as slaves. After his death in 1860, the Dogras invaded Yasin in 1863, killed over two thousand people and made an additional three thousand, mostly women and children, slaves. They took one thousand Yasini women as slaves to Jammu and Kashmir. On the other hand, Chilasi tribes gained notoriety for raiding people of Astore and carrying off Astori women and children.

In 2013, Australian industrialist Andrew Forrest signed a deal with the Government of Punjab to make forced labor illegal.
