= Khushwaqt dynasty =

Ruling dynasty in northern Pakistan from 17th to 20th centuries

Khushwaqt dynasty was a ruling dynasty in northern Pakistan from 17th to 20th centuries. A cadet branch of Kator dynasty of Chitral, it primarily ruled the valleys of Mastuj, Yasin, Ishkoman, Punial, Ghizer, and at its height under Gohar Aman (r. 1842–1860), Gilgit, Darel and Tangir. In 1880s, Khushwaqt territories were taken over by Aman ul-Mulk of Chitral; after his death and Chitral Expedition of 1895, Yasin, Ishkoman and Ghizer were separated from Chitral state and incorporated into Gilgit Agency. Last of Khushwaqt rulers, Raja Pakhtun Wali died in 1917. The former territories of the dynasty comprise modern-day districts of Ghizer, Darel, Tangir, and Upper Chitral.

== History ==
The dynasty was founded by Khushwaqt, a grandson of Senge Ali who was also the ancestor of the Kator dynasty. Khushwaqt ruled the Yasin Valley and Mastuj from 1660 to 1700. During the rule of Gohar Aman, there was a long struggle against Sikhs in 1842 and Dogras in 1852 by Khushwaqts over Gilgit. After his death in 1860, Dogras returned, capturing Gilgit in the same year and massacring people of Yasin in 1863. By 1877, his son Pahlwan Bahadur had consolidated his control over Yasin, Ishkoman, Ghizer and Mastuj, but when he was away on an attack in 1880 on Punial (which by then had become a tributary estate of Jammu and Kashmir), Aman ul-Mulk, the mehtar of Chitral, captured above areas, appointing his own governors in the territories. Pahlwan Bahadur was forced to flee. Aman ul-Mulk appointed his son, Nizam ul-Mulk, at Yasin in 1882, while at Ishkoman, Ali Mardan Shah, the former Mir of Wakhan, was appointed governor, who had fled there after Wakhan was occupied by Afghans.

After the Chitral Expedition in 1895, Chitral was transferred to newly created Malakand Agency while above areas were retained in Gilgit Agency; in 1906, Mehtar Jao Abdur Rahman Khan, the eldest son of Pahlwan Bahadur, was the nominal chief of Yasin and Ghizer. By 1947, only at Ishkoman Sultan Murad Khan, a member of Khushwaqt dynasty, remained on the behalf of Gilgit Agency on non-hereditary basis. Mastuj was returned to Chitral in 1914.

A nephew of Gohar Aman, Pakhtun Wali, had fled to Tangir after 1895, and by 1911 had been recognised as hereditary chief of Tangir, Darel, Harban, Sazin and Shatial by British government, in what was then considered Yaghistan. After his death in 1917 these territories were again reverted to be not a part of Gilgit Agency but of Yaghistan.
