= Sikh intervention in Gilgit =

Military expedition by the Sikh Empire

Sikh Intervention in Gilgit
- Part of Expansion of the Sikh Empire
- Map of Gilgit-Baltistan
Date	1842–1843
Location	Gilgit Valley and Astore Valley
Result	Sikh victory: Karim Khan restored; Permanent Sikh occupation of Gilgit
Territorial changes	Astore and Chilas annexed by the Sikh Empire

Belligerents
Sikh Empire	Principality of Yasin and allied hill tribes

Commanders and leaders
Col. Nathu Shah; Mathura Das; Karim Khan	Gohar Aman of Yasin

Strength
~1,000 Sikh soldiers	Unknown

Casualties and losses
Heavy	Heavy

The Sikh Intervention in Gilgit (1842–1843) was a military expedition by the Sikh Empire to conquer the valleys of Gilgit and Astore. Following the death of Raja of Gilgit, Sikander Shah, who was killed by Raja Gohar Aman of Yasin, his brother Karim Khan went to Kashmir to ask for help. The Kashmir Governor of the Sikh Empire, Sheikh Ghulam Mohi-ud-Din, dispatched a Sikh force led by Colonel Nathu Shah. The Sikh forces defeated Gohar Aman, established a garrison, and reinstated Karim Khan as a vassal.

== Background ==
The northwestern part of the Kashmir region, consisting of Gilgit, Hunza, and Chitral, is surrounded by the Hindu Kush and Karakoram ranges.

Historically, the region lay between areas corresponding to present-day Afghanistan and Xinjiang, and routes leading into Central Asia, a position that later gave it strategic importance. The region was historically dominated by Muslim Dardic (Indo-Aryan) clans closely related to the Chaks of Kashmir, whose authority persisted at the local level despite increasing internal fragmentation. These Dardic tribes were frequently hostile to one another and resisted sustained external control. Among them, the most powerful was the Khushwaqt family of Yasin, which exercised a loose and contested dominance over neighboring clans.

=== Gohar Aman's Invasion of Gilgit ===
Gohar Aman of Yasin, who belonged to the Khushwaqt family, became the ruler of the Yasin principality and sought to expand his influence in the surrounding region. By 1842, the Gilgit region was marked by tribal warfare and blood feuds, which intensified following the death of Raja Tahir Shah of Nagar. Taking advantage of this instability, Gohar Aman launched his first invasion of Gilgit but was repelled by Raja Najam of Punial. A second invasion followed shortly thereafter, but this attempt was likewise repulsed.

In 1836, Sikander Shah rose to power in Gilgit while Gohar Aman was consolidating his strength. Sikander Shah attempted to neutralize the Yasin ruler by sending assassins, but the effort failed. Having secured control over Chitral, Gohar Aman assembled a force of around a thousand men and launched a third invasion of Gilgit. Sikander Shah avoided a pitched battle and was besieged by Yasin forces at Sankar in 1840. After nine months, provisions were exhausted, forcing him to surrender. He was executed ten days later.

=== Request for Sikh Intervention ===
Karim Khan, the younger brother of the late Sikander Shah and a member of the ruling house of Gilgit, was in Gor, a locality within the Gilgit region, when he learned of his brother's death. He initially began mobilizing his supporters to challenge Gohar Aman but, on the advice of his ministers, chose instead to seek external assistance. In 1842 he therefore proceeded to Kashmir, which was governed on behalf of the Sikh Empire by Sheikh Ghulam Mohi-ud-Din.

Karim Khan proceeded to seek assistance from the Sikh governor of Kashmir, Sheikh Ghulam Muhy-ud-Din, who, according to the historian R.K. Parmu, was under the influence of Gulab Singh, the Raja of Jammu. He accordingly travelled to Srinagar and requested military assistance. The governor accepted the request and assembled a Sikh force of approximately 1,000 soldiers, appointing Colonel Nathu Shah of Gujranwala and Mathura Das of Jammu to lead the expedition.

== Expedition ==
While advancing toward Gilgit, Nathu Shah captured Astore and subsequently Chilas. Confronted with the Sikh advance, Gohar Aman withdrew from Gilgit and retreated to Basin, a locality in the upper Gilgit region, where he established a defensive camp. Nathu Shah pursued him and defeated the Yasin forces at Basin, with both sides suffering heavy casualties. He refrained from pursuing Gohar Aman further into the Karakoram ranges, in order to avoid the risk of ambush by Yasin forces in difficult terrain.

Karim Khan was reinstated as the ruler of Gilgit but was a vassal under heavy restrictions, while a Sikh military contingent was stationed in the region as a garrison. Nathu Shah was subsequently recalled to Lahore.

Following Nathu Shah's departure, Mathura Das, an officer in the Sikh expedition, sought to gain personal distinction and led a detachment into the mountainous region of Sharot. There, his force was ambushed and defeated by Gohar Aman. Mathura Das fled back to Srinagar. In response to this setback, Nathu Shah returned to Gilgit, pacified the region, and consolidated Sikh influence through a series of political alliances, including marriage ties with Gohar Aman and with ruling families of Hunza and Nagar.

The Sikhs did not fully hand over Gilgit to Karim Khan, despite having intervened on his behalf. According to Muhammad Yusuf Saraf, a form of joint administration was established in which Karim Khan received a share of local revenues, while other imposts were appropriated by the Sikh government. A strong Sikh garrison was stationed at Gilgit under a thanedar, indicating effective military control. By the end of 1843, Sikh forces had defeated Gohar Aman and secured Gilgit, Astore, and Chilas, marking the conclusion of the military intervention.

While Karim Khan retained a nominal position, Sikh authority predominated. Bakshi characterizes this arrangement as a “permanent occupation” of Gilgit by the Sikhs, reflecting the sustained presence of Sikh troops rather than full administrative annexation.

== Aftermath ==
Karim Khan was killed in 1844 during a military engagement, and was succeeded by his son, Muhammad Khan II. Sikh control over Gilgit nevertheless continued until the outbreak of the First Anglo-Sikh War. Following their defeat, the Sikhs were compelled to cede Kashmir to the East India Company, which subsequently transferred it to Gulab Singh, making him the Maharaja of Jammu and Kashmir.

The Sikh garrison stationed in Gilgit was thereafter replaced by the forces of Gulab Singh. In 1851, Muhammad Khan II was defeated by Gohar Aman, and the garrison was destroyed. The forces of Gulab Singh were unable to re-establish control over Gilgit until 1856, following the death of Gohar Aman.
