= Baltistan Agency =

Political Agency in Pakistan (c. 1948–72)

Baltistan in Kashmir

Baltistan Agency was a political agency of Pakistan that existed from 1948 until 1972, when it was merged with Gilgit Agency to form Northern Areas. It was under the jurisdiction of the Ministry of Kashmir Affairs (MKA).

The control of Baltistan, formerly a part of Ladakh Wazarat of princely state of Jammu and Kashmir, was taken over by Pakistan in November 1948, and an Additional Political Agent was appointed at Skardu under the control of Political Agent at Gilgit. It was upgraded to full agency in January 1964, headed by a Political Agent, who was directly answerable to the Political Resident. The agency was divided into two subdivisions, Skardu and Khaplu. Due to the undemocratic nature of the system of governance it produced sense of grievance among the people and by 1971, a political party, Tanzeem-e-Millat Party, was formed in Gilgit which demanded full provincial status for the region. Both Gilgit and Baltistan agencies were ultimately abolished and merged in August 1972 to create Northern Areas, with Baltistan Agency converted into Baltistan District, and later, Baltistan Division.
