= Yasin massacre =

Yasin massacre may refer to:

- Deir Yassin massacre, in 1948 when Zionist paramilitaries attacked the Palestinian village of Deir Yassin
- 1863 Yasin massacre, at the Yasin Valley in the Hindu Kush (present-day Gilgit-Baltistan, Pakistan)
