= Burusho people =

Ethnolinguistic group of Kashmir

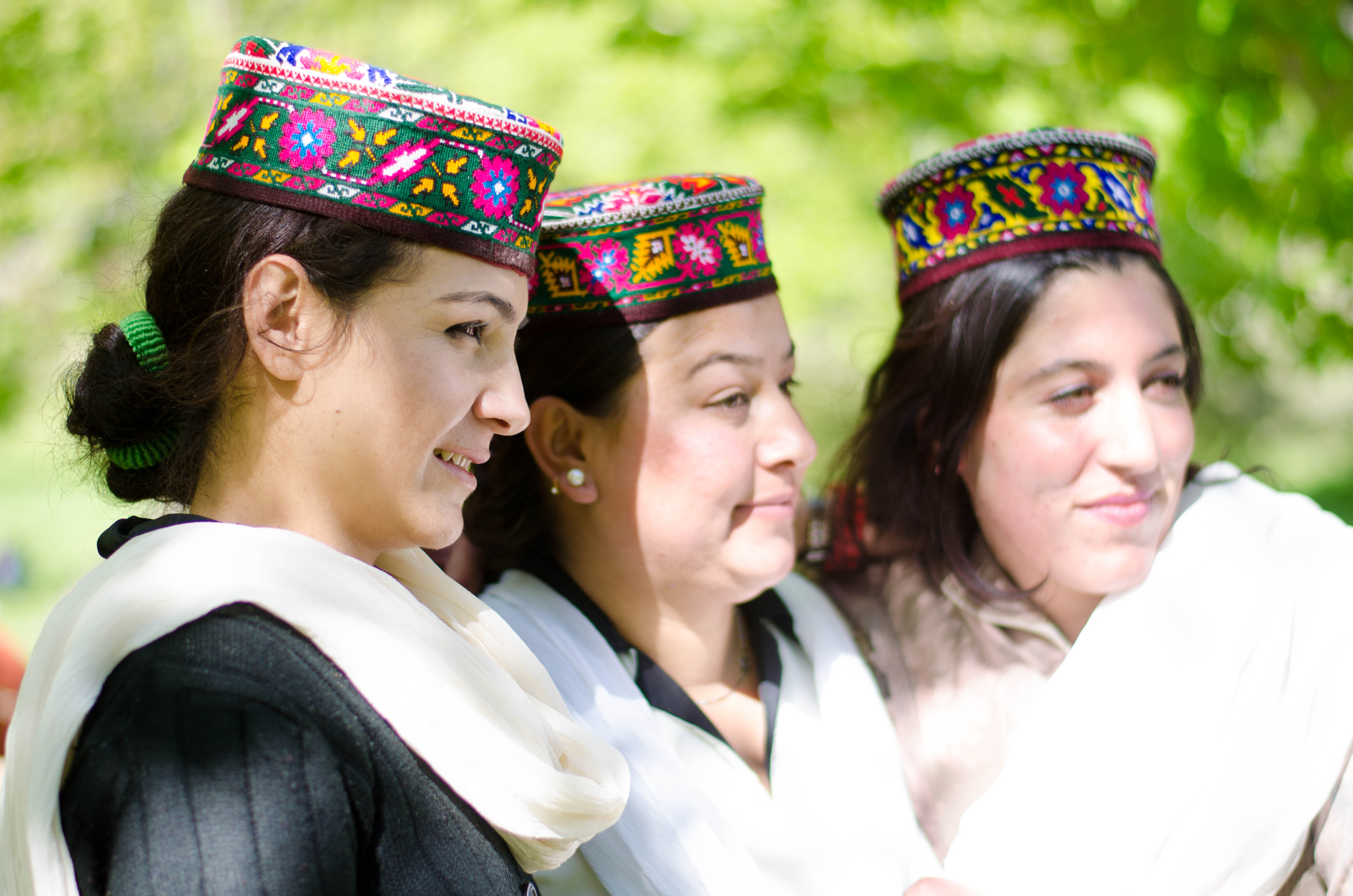
- A group of Burusho women in the Hunza Valley, Pakistan, wearing Iraghi hats

Total population
- 126,300 (2018)

Languages
- L1: Burushaski (native language); L2: Urdu (national language)

Religion
- Islam (mostly consisting of Ismaili and Twelver Shia Muslims)

The Burusho or Brusho, also known as Botraj and Hunzakut, are an ethnolinguistic group native to Yasin, Hunza-Nagar and other valleys of Gilgit-Baltistan in northern Pakistan, with a small minority residing in Jammu and Kashmir, India. Their language, Burushaski, has been classified as a language isolate. The region inhabited by the Burusho people is traditionally known as Brushal.

== History ==
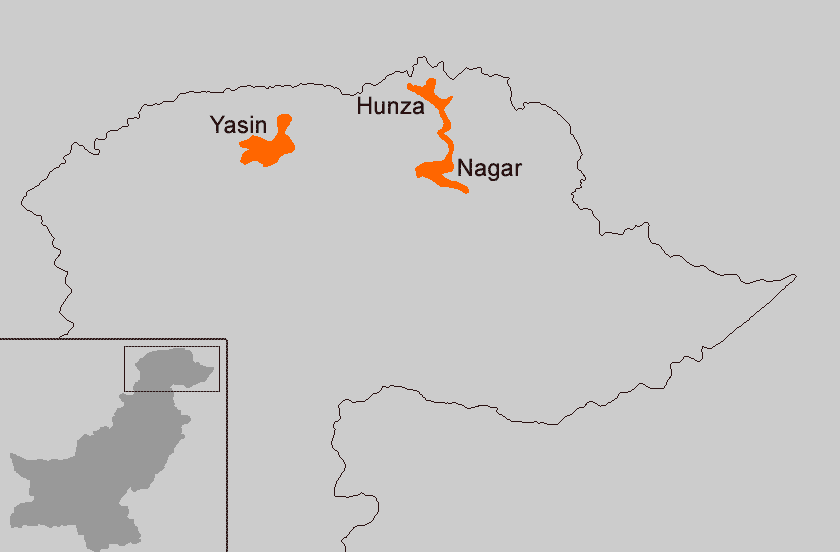
Areas of predominance of Burushaski language: Hunza, Nagar and Yasin

Although their origins are subject to debate, it is claimed that the Burusho people "were indigenous to northwestern India and were pushed higher into the mountains by the movements of the Indo-Aryans, who traveled southward sometime around 1800 B.C." Today Burushaski is spoken in the two valleys, Yasin Valley (where it is known as Werchikwar) and Hunza-Nagar Valley, both being separated by Shina-speaking Gilgit Valley. It is most probable that in past language of Gilgit was Burushaski as well, and based on glottochronology, the mass immigration of Shina people into Gilgit and the separation of the two dialects of Hunza and Yasin can be dated to 10th century CE.

Prior to the modern era, the area in which most Burusho now live was part of the princely states of Hunza and Nagar under the British Raj, until becoming part of Pakistan. The Yasin Valley on the other hand came under sway of Khowar-speaking Khushwaqt dynasty from Chitral from the 17th century onwards.

== Culture ==
The Burusho are known for their rich music and dance culture, along with progressive views towards education and women.

=== Longevity claims ===
Medical researchers believe that peace, harmony and less exposure to stress in the lives of the Hunza people are linked to their longer life spans. The lack of urban harms, the healthy way of life, moderate use of fruits and vegetables and other factors contribute to the health and long life of these people.

Independent writers have refuted these longevity claims, citing a life expectancy of 53 years for men and 52 for women, although with a high standard deviation.

Such ideas also promoted by natural health advocates have been discredited. There is no reliable documentation validating the age of alleged Hunza supercentenarians.

=== Influence in the Western world ===
Healthy living advocate J. I. Rodale wrote a book called The Healthy Hunzas in 1948 that asserted that the Hunzas, noted for their longevity and many centenarians, were long-lived because they consumed healthy organic foods, such as dried apricots and almonds, and had plenty of fresh air and exercise. He often mentioned them in his Prevention magazine as exemplary of the benefits of leading a healthy lifestyle.

John Clark stayed among the Hunza people for 20 months and in his 1956 book Hunza — Lost Kingdom of the Himalayas writes: "I wish also to express my regrets to those travelers whose impressions have been contradicted by my experience. On my first trip through Hunza, I acquired almost all the misconceptions they did: The Healthy Hunzas, the Democratic Court, The Land Where There Are No Poor, and the rest — and only long-continued living in Hunza revealed the actual situations". Regarding the misconception about Hunza people's health, Clark also writes that most of his patients had malaria, dysentery, worms, trachoma, and other health conditions easily diagnosed and quickly treated. In his first two trips he treated 5,684 patients.

The October 1953 issue of National Geographic had an article on the Hunza River Valley that inspired Carl Barks' story Tralla La.

== Jammu and Kashmir ==
A group of 350 Burusho people also reside in the Indian union territory of Jammu and Kashmir, being mainly concentrated in Batamalu, as well as in Botraj Mohalla, which is southeast of Hari Parbat. This Burusho community is descended from two former princes of the British Indian princely states of Hunza and Nagar, who with their families, migrated to this region in the 19th century. They are known as the Botraj by other ethnic groups in the state, and practice Shi'ite Islam. Arranged marriages are customary.

Since the partition of India in 1947, the Indian Burusho community have not been in contact with the Pakistani Burusho. The Government of India has granted the Burusho community Scheduled Tribe status, as well as reservation, and therefore, "most members of the community are in government jobs." The Burusho people of India speak Burushashki, also known as Khajuna, and their dialect, known as Jammu and Kashmir Burushashski (JKB), "has undergone several changes which make it systematically different from other dialects of Burushaski spoken in Pakistan". In addition, many Jammu and Kashmir Burusho are multilingual, also speaking Kashmiri and Hindustani, as well as Balti and Shina to a lesser extent.

== See also ==
- Brokpa people
- Kalash people
