= Yashkuns =

Subgroup of Shina people

یشکنز

Regions with significant populations
- Gilgit-Baltistan, Chitral, Kohistan

Languages
- Shina, Burushaski, Urdu

Religion
- Islam

Related ethnic groups
- Other Dardic peoples

The Yashkun or Yashkuns (Shina: یشکن) are a sub-group of the Shina people, an ethnic group in northern Pakistan. They speak Shina and Burushaski languages.

== Etymology ==
According to Karl Jettmar (1980), the name Yashkun is from Burushaski, meaning "aboriginal, local inhabitant".

== History ==
According to A. H. Dani (2001), Yashkuns are indigenous to northern Pakistan. Dani suggests that Yashkuns are ethnically related to the Burusho people of Hunza Valley; accordingly with Shina migrations into Gilgit-Baltistan, Yashkuns gradually adopted Shina language in place of Burushaski. This scenario is supported by the fact that the proportion of Yashkun population increases northwards, with their highest share in Hunza, Nagar and Astore. Additionally, many Yashkuns in Hunza still speak Burushaski.

The Yashkuns, in terms of mitochondrial DNA haplogroups, have 29.47% H, 13.68% T and 13.68% M; these are most often found, respectively, amongst the modern populations of West Eurasia, South Asia, and East Asia. Yashkuns are closely related to the neighbouring ethnic groups such as Khos and Wakhis.
