= Gilgit Agency =

Agency of the British Indian Empire & later Pakistan

Gilgit Agency گلگت ایجنسی
- Agency
- 1889–1974
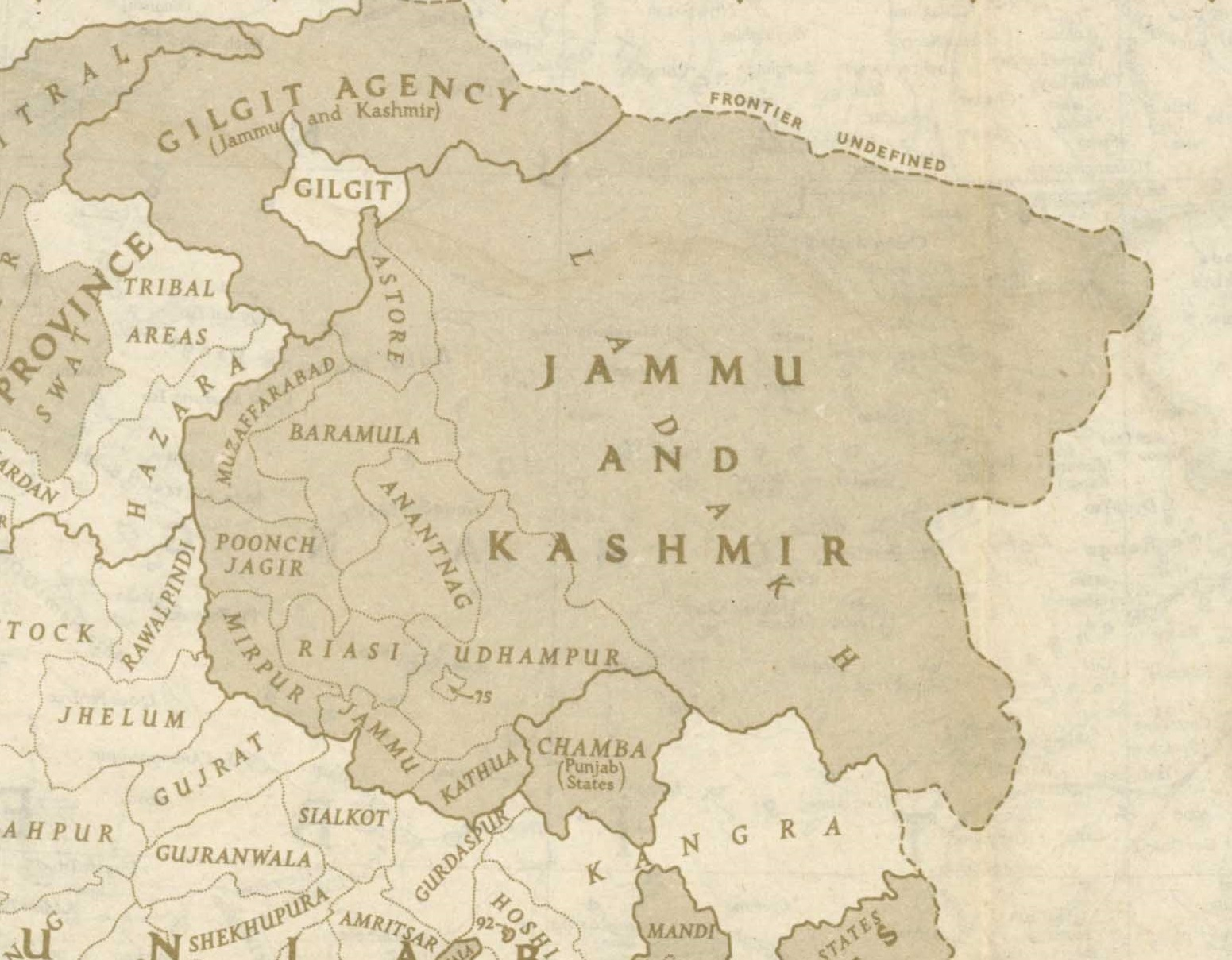
- The Gilgit Agency at the northern periphery of Jammu and Kashmir (1946)
- History
  - Agency of British Raj: 1889
  - Gilgit Wazarat leased: 26 March 1935
  - Lease terminated: 30 July 1947
  - Gilgit rebellion: 1 November 1947
  - Pakistani Political agent: 19 November 1947
  - Merged into Northern Areas: 1974
- "A collection of treaties, engagements, and sunnuds relating to India and neighbouring countries"

The Gilgit Agency (Note: Urdu: گلگت ایجنسی) was an agency within the British Raj. It encompassed the Gilgit tehsil of the princely state of Jammu and Kashmir, the states of Hunza and Nagar, the governorships of Yasin, Koh-i-Ghizer, Ishkoman, Punial and the tribal areas of Gor, Darel, Tangir, and the district of Chilas. (Note: Corresponding to the modern day Gilgit Division as well as Diamer Division, excluding Astore District) The agency headquarters was based in the town of Gilgit, within the Gilgit tehsil of Jammu and Kashmir. (Note: British agencies were generally based in British-ruled territories even though they controlled native-ruled states. In this instance, the Maharaja was persuaded to allow a base in his territory.)

Gilgit Agency was bounded in the west by the princely state of Chitral, in the northwest by Afghanistan's Wakhan Corridor, in the east by Chinese Turkestan, in the south by the Kashmir province, and in the southeast by the Ladakh wazarat of Jammu and Kashmir (which included Baltistan).

The primary objective of establishing the Gilgit Agency was to bolster and fortify these regions, particularly in the context of concerns about Russian encroachment in the area. An Officer on Special Duty was established in 1877 in the town of Gilgit till 1882 to monitor the Baroghil and Ishkoman passes. After seven years a permanent Political Agent in 1889 was established. In 1935, the Gilgit tehsil of the princely state was leased from the maharaja, which also came under the administration of the Political Agent. The Astore tehsil continued to be under the Maharaja's administration. On 1 July 1947, shortly before the partition of India, not only was the Gilgit Leased Area retroceded to the Maharaja but the whole of Gilgit Agency was handed over to the Dogras.

The Gilgit Scouts, who were hopeful of Jammu and Kashmir state acceding to Pakistan staged a rebellion at the news of the accession of Jammu and Kashmir to India on 26 October 1947. The Gilgit Scouts, led by Major William Brown, took the Dogra governor into protective custody on 1 November 1947 and raised the Pakistan flag on 2 November in Gilgit. Hunza and Nagar states had by then already sent in their accession letters addressed to Muhammad Ali Jinnah. Pakistan sent in a Political Agent on 16 November who took over the administration of the areas thereafter.

Under the Pakistani administration, the Gilgit, Astore, and Skardu (Baltistan Agency) tehsils, as well as the principalities previously under the agency, were clubbed together under the name of "Gilgit Agency". The unit remained in existence till 1974, after which it was abolished by the Pakistani Prime Minister Zulfiqar Ali Bhutto and turned into the Federally Administered Northern Areas (later renamed to Gilgit-Baltistan).

== Geography ==
The Gilgit Agency remained an "amorphous unit" throughout the period of its existence, with its status relative to Jammu and Kashmir undefined. It comprised various princely states, un-administered tribes, jagirs and directly administered areas on the northwestern frontier of British Indian Empire. In 1927, the resident of Kashmir defined the Agency as consisting of:

- Kashmir state territory, i.e., Gilgit wazarat, comprising the Gilgit tehsil (including Bunji) and Astor,
- The "Political Districts" of Hunza, Nagir, Punial, Yasin, Ghizer, Ishkoman and Chilas,
- Un-administered areas of Darel and Tangir.

All these territories had their own rulers or systems of administration; the Agency provided supervision under a British Political Agent. The British also continued to alter the jurisdiction of the Agency by adding or removing territories. For example, Chitral, which was originally part of the Agency, was incorporated into the Malakand Agency after 1895, while in 1934 Indus Kohistan was transferred from the Gilgit Agency to the North-West Frontier Province. The frontier with China was likewise mapped and remapped on various occasions.

The states of Hunza and Nagar were added into the agency after the 1891 Hunza-Nagar campaign. Until 1935, Gilgit and Astore tehsils (now districts) comprised the Gilgit wazarat of Jammu and Kashmir with its own governor (Wazir-e-wazarat), who was also based at Gilgit. However, the Political Agent did exercise some control over the wazarat's affairs, leading to a system of dual rule and causing frictions.

To simplify governance, the British formally leased the part of Gilgit tehsil lying west of Indus, which included the Gilgit town, from maharaja Hari Singh in 1935, as the "Gilgit Leased Area". It was administered directly by the Political Agent. They also lifted the ban on cow slaughter, which helped in improving their image. The Astore tehsil became its own wazarat, which was administered as part of the Kashmir province of Jammu and Kashmir.

In 1941, the Gilgit Agency had a population of 77,000 and the Gilgit leased area had 23,000. Both the areas together came to be loosely referred to as the 'Gilgit Agency'. The administration of the Agency was carried out "on behalf of His Highness' Government". The Political Agent communicated with the central government in New Delhi via Peshawar (the capital of the North-West Frontier Province) instead of the Resident in Kashmir, reportedly for "security" reasons.

== History ==
=== After 1700s ===
During the First Anglo-Sikh War, Gulab Singh of Dogra dynasty helped the British Empire against the Sikhs. After the defeat of the Sikh Empire, the treaty of Lahore (1846) and the treaty of Amritsar (1846) were signed. Under Article IV of the treaty of Lahore, signed between the Maharaja Duleep Singh and the British Empire, the Sikhs ceded the territories between the rivers Beas and Indus as war indemnity.

IV. The British Government having demanded from the Lahore State, as indemnification for the expenses of the war, in addition to the cession of territory described in Article 3, payment of one and half crore of Rupees, and the Lahore Government being unable to pay the whole of this sum at this time, or to give security satisfactory to the British Government for its eventual payment, the Maharajah cedes to the Honourable Company, in perpetual sovereignty, as equivalent for one crore of Rupees, all his forts, territories, rights and interests in the hill countries, which are situated between the Rivers Beas and Indus, including the Provinces of Cashmere and Hazarah.

In the north, these territories included Gilgit (the present Gilgit District), Astore (the present Astore District) and Chilas (presently a tehsil of the Diamir District). By 1860s, the three areas were constituted as a Gilgit wazarat (district), and the princely states of Hunza and Nagar to the northeast accepted the suzerainty of the Maharaja Ranbir Singh.

The Treaty of Amritsar did not constrain the Maharaja from establishing relationships with external powers, and he is said to have had dealings with Russia, Afghanistan, China and Turkestan. The British watched these developments with concern, especially in the light of Russian expansion in the north.

=== Establishment of agency ===
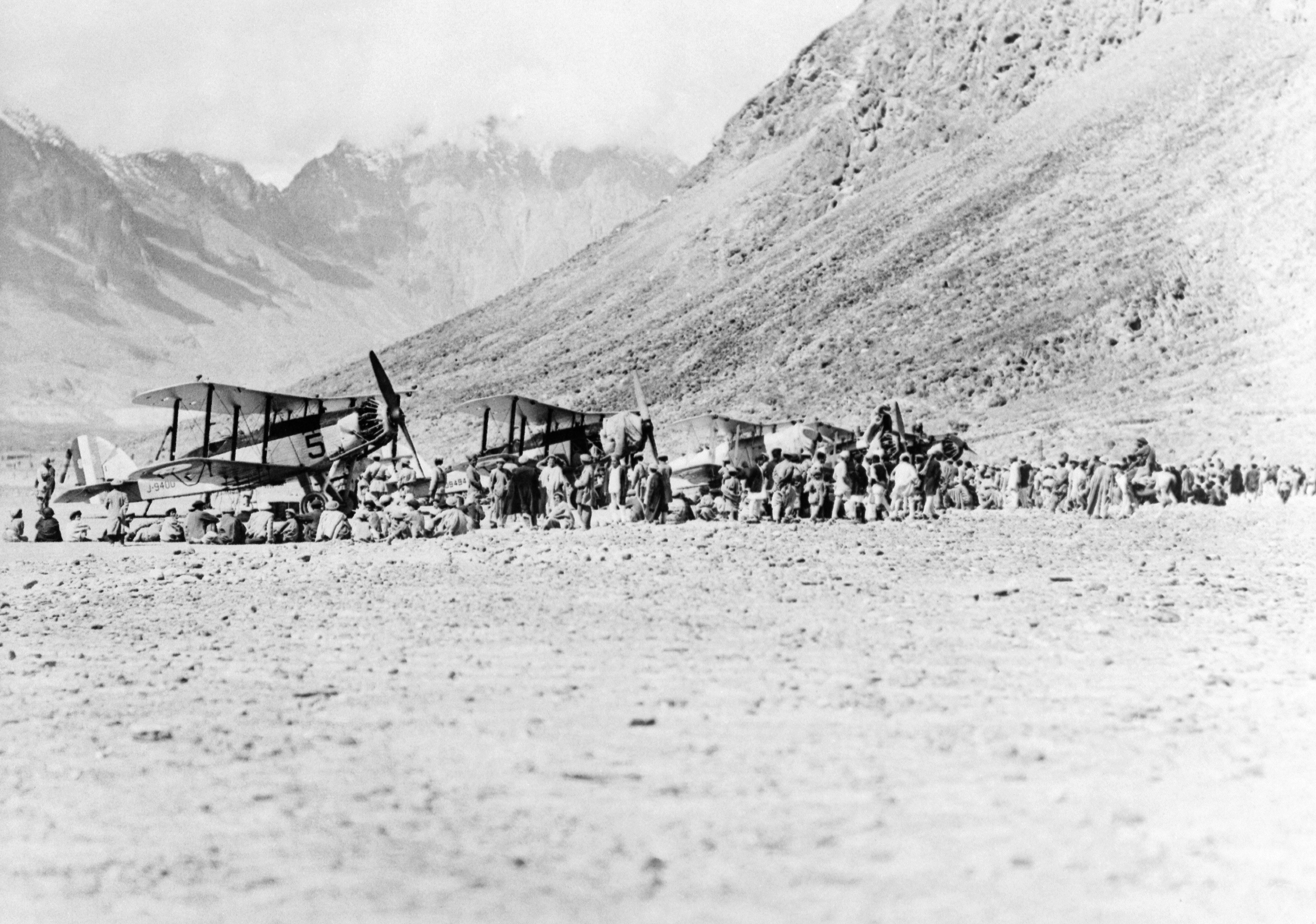
British Westland Wapitis based at an airfield in Gilgit around 1930.

Ranbir Singh's successor Pratap Singh was a weak ruler. The British used the opportunity to establish an agency in Gilgit in 1889, stationing a Political Agent who reported to the British Resident in Srinagar. The initial purpose of the Agency was to keep watch on the frontier and to restrain Hunza and Nagar from dealing with the Russians.

In 1888, the rulers of Hunza and Nagar expelled Dogras but both states were again subjugated by Anglo-Dogra forces in 1891, following the Hunza–Nagar Campaign. However, rulers of the two princely states continued to enjoy internal independence.

Soon afterwards, the states of Hunza and Nagar were brought under the direct purview of the Gilgit Agency. The Jammu and Kashmir State Forces were stationed in a garrison at Gilgit, which were used by the Agency to keep order. They were replaced by a British-officered Gilgit Scouts in 1913. The British government tried to improve local infrastructure and relations with the tribes and mirs, putting them in contrast to the maharaja's governors. For example, a local paramilitary, known as Gilgit Scouts, was raised in which usually the relatives of local rulers were recruited.

Gradually, the territories to the west of Gilgit (Punial, Yasin, Kuh-Ghizar, Ishkoman and Chitral) were also brought under the purview of the Gilgit Agency. These areas were nominally under the suzerainty of princely state of Kashmir but were directly administered by the Agency. Following a rebellion in 1895, Chitral was transferred to the Malakand Agency in the North-West Frontier Province. The remaining areas remained under the control of the Gilgit Agency, which administered them through governors. In areas like Ghizer and Yasin, the governor was appointed by British Indian government on the advice of Kashmir officials, while Hunza and Nagar were considered independent states. Similarly, although British had aided maharaja in establishing suzerainty over Hunza, they considered it a part of Gilgit Agency rather than Kashmir.

== Political status ==
The political status of the Gilgit Agency was ambiguous. After the creation of Gilgit Agency in 1889, a system of dual governance was established, in which the Dogra Wazir-e-wazarat governed Astore, Gilgit and Bunji while the British Political Agent indirectly supervised Hunza, Nager, Punial, Ishkoman, Yasin, Koh-Ghizer, and Chilas. However, there was no clear division of power, which continued to be a source of friction among the two, and there was ambiguity even regarding which areas formed part of Kashmir vis-à-vis the British domains. In 1909, the British government ruled that: "the districts of Hunza, Nager, and Chilas, and the Khuswakt districts [of Punial, Ishkoman, Yasin, and Ghizer] […] are not Kashmir territory, though they are under the suzerainty of Kashmir, and consequently Kashmir State officials are not permitted to interfere directly in their internal administration." Hence, the Gilgit wazarat was not treated as synonymous with the Gilgit Agency, but rather a part of it.

The part of Gilgit wazarat lying to the west of Indus was leased by British in 1935. This did not end maharaja's claims over the territory, however. After the passage of Government of India Act 1935, the Maharaja of Kashmir decided to join the federation. He believed that as a part of Kashmir, the states of Hunza and Nagar would automatically join it. The British Indian government strictly contradicted this point of view, maintaining that these territories [Hunza, Nagar, Chilas, Kuh-i-Ghizer, Ishkoman, and Yasin], “[…] though under Kashmir’s suzerainty, were never recognized as a part of Kashmir; Hunza and Nagar themselves being separate Indian States and Chilas, Kohghizar, Ishkuman and Yasin being (presumably) 'tribal areas'."

In 1939, the Kashmir state government issued a lengthy memorandum written by the Chief Secretary Ram Chandra Kak, which claimed that the areas under dispute “have been an integral part of the territories of Jammu and Kashmir State […].” Finally, in a 1941 decision the British Indian government settled that, “Hunza and Nager were not part of J&K State but separate states and that the other areas in question were not parts of J&K but were in fact tribal areas.” Following this, the British government took measures to separate the administration of Gilgit Agency from Kashmir. For example, the population of Hunza was not included in the sum total of Jammu and Kashmir in the 1941 Census, and the people of Hunza and Nagar were no longer considered state subjects, but crown subjects.

Regardless, the maharaja of Jammu and Kashmir maintained his claims over the territories. After the untimely termination of lease agreement of 1935, the British handed over the administration of not only the Gilgit Wazarat but the whole agency in 1947 to Maharaja. In the words of historian Chad Haines, "Those regions so unequivocally stated as not being "part of Kashmir" in 1935 were given to the State of Jammu and Kashmir without any question or debate by the British."

== Inside Pakistan ==
The local rulers of these territories continued to appear at the Jammu and Kashmir Durbars until 1947. Following the Partition of India, on 31 October 1947 the British officer William Brown led the Gilgit Scouts in a coup against the Dogra governor of Gilgit which resulted in the region becoming part of the Pakistan administered Kashmir. Most of the Ladakh wazarat, including the Kargil area, became part of Indian-administered Kashmir. The Line of Control established at the end of the war is the current de facto border of India and Pakistan in the Kashmir region.

Initially, the Gilgit Agency was not absorbed into any of the provinces of West Pakistan, but was ruled directly by political agents of the federal government of Pakistan. In 1963, Pakistan entered into a treaty with China to relinquish claims over the Trans-Karakoram Tract in return of receiving Shimshal Valley, with the provision that the settlement was subject to the final solution of the Kashmir dispute.

The dissolution of the province of West Pakistan in 1970 was accompanied by change of the name of the Gilgit Agency to the Northern Areas. By 1974, the states of Hunza and Nagar and the independent valleys of Darel-Tangir, which were the de facto dependencies of Pakistan, were also incorporated into the Northern Areas.

While India continues to claim the entire region of Gilgit-Baltistan as a part of the erstwhile princely state of Jammu and Kashmir, Pakistan's stand is that a plebiscite as per UN resolution be held in the territories referred to as Jammu & Kashmir.

== Political agents ==
=== Kashmiri Wazir-i-Wazarat ===
- 1860–1867: Mian Jawahir Singh
- 1867–1873: Bakshi Radha Kishen
- 1873–1876: Bhai Ganga Singh
- 1876–1880: Lala Ram Kishen
- 1880–1882: Lala Beli Ram
- 1882–1887: Bakshi Mul Raj
- 1887–1889: Lala Din Pat
- 1897–1907: Sardar Mohammed Akbar Khan
- 1933–1938: Rao Rattan Singh
- 1 Aug 1947–1 Nov 1947: Ghansar Singh Jamwal

=== British Agents ===
Following is a list of British Political Agents at Gilgit:

- 17 Jul 1889–1 Nov 1893: Algernon George Arnold Durand
- 2 Nov 1893–26 Jan 1894: Andrew Murison McCrae Bruce (acting)
- 27 Jan 1894–28 Sep 1896: George Scott Robertson
- 29 Jul 1896–13 Aug 1897: Stuart Hill Godfrey
- 14 Aug 1897–30 Sep 1898: Arthur Henry MacMahon
- 1 Oct 1898–21 Oct 1901: John Manners Smith
- 22 Oct 1901–18 Oct 1903: William Hall Mackintosh Stewart
- 19 Oct 1903–4 Oct 1906: Bertrand Evelyn Mellish Gurdon
- 15 Oct 1906–Apr 1908: Arthur Francis Bruce
- 30 Apr 1908–Oct 1908: Archibald Duncan Macpherson (1st time) (acting)
- 28 Oct 1908–29 May 1911: Armine Brereton Dew
- 30 May 1911–12 Oct 1916: Archibald Duncan Macpherson (2nd time)
- 27 Nov 1911–14 Feb 1912: Clendon Turberville Daukes (acting for Macpherson)
- 13 Oct 1916–20 May 1917: Edmond Henry Salt James
- 21 May 1917–22 Sep 1920: Charles Aitchison Smith
- 23 Sep 1920–20 Sep 1924: David Lockhart Robertson Lorimer
- 21 Sep 1924–10 Oct 1927: Gordon Dalyell
- 11 Oct 1927–28 Sep 1931: Herbert John Todd
- 29 Sep 1931–21 Sep 1934: George Van Baerle Gillan
- 22 Sep 1934–4 Oct 1937: George Kirkbride
- 5 Oct 1937–13 Jun 1939: Ian William Galbraith
- 14 Jun 1939–2 Oct 1939: Richmond Keith Molesworth Battye (acting)
- 3 Oct 1939–8 Jul 1942: Gerald Charles Lawrence Crichton
- 8 Jul 1942–5 Sep 1945: Evelyn Hey Cobb
- 5 Sep 1945–31 Jul 1947: Roger Noel Bacon

== See also ==
- China–Pakistan border
- Kashmir conflict

== Bibliography ==
- Sökefeld, Martin (2023). "Locating Gilgit-Baltistan". In Duschinski, Haley; Bhan, Mona; Robinson, Cabeiri deBergh (eds.). The Palgrave Handbook of New Directions in Kashmir Studies. Springer Nature. ISBN 978-3-031-28520-2.
- Kreutzmann, Hermann (2024). "Passage to Kashgar: People, Roads, and Commodities". Pamirian Crossroads and Beyond: Human Geography and Geopolitics. Brill. pp. 48–49. ISBN 978-90-04-70436-7.
- Hussain, Shafqat (2015). "Frontier Matters". Remoteness and Modernity: Transformation and Continuity in Northern Pakistan. Yale University Press. ISBN 978-0-300-20555-8.
- Haines, Chad (2013). "Mapping liminal territories Frontierization and the making of the Gilgit Agency". Nation, Territory, and Globalization in Pakistan: Traversing the Margins. Routledge. ISBN 978-1-136-44997-0.
- Sökefeld, Martin (2018). "Not Part of Kashmir, but of the Kashmir Dispute". In Zutshi, Chitralekha (ed.). Kashmir: History, Politics, Representation. Cambridge University Press. ISBN 978-1-107-18197-7.
- Census of India, 1941, Volume XXII – Jammu and Kashmir, Parts I & II, The Ranbir Government Press, 1943
- Bangash, Yaqoob Khan (2010). "Three Forgotten Accessions: Gilgit, Hunza and Nagar". The Journal of Imperial and Commonwealth History. 38 (1): 117–143. doi:10.1080/03086530903538269. S2CID 159652497.
- Chohan, Amar Singh (1997). Gilgit Agency 1877–1935, Second Reprint. Atlantic Publishers & Dist. ISBN 978-81-7156-146-9.
- Schofield, Victoria (2003) [First published in 2000]. Kashmir in Conflict. London and New York: I. B. Taurus & Co. ISBN 1-86064-898-3.
- Ali, Nosheen (2019). Delusional States. Cambridge University Press. ISBN 978-1-108-49744-2.
- Dani, Ahmad Hasan (1991) [1989]. History of Northern Areas of Pakistan (2nd ed.). Islamabad: National Institute of Historical and Cultural Research, Quaid-i-Azam University. ISBN 978-969-415-016-1.
- Snedden, Christopher (2015). Understanding Kashmir and Kashmiris. Oxford University Press. ISBN 978-1-84904-342-7.
