= Ladakh Wazarat =

Ladakh Wazarat was the largest administrative unit of the princely state of Jammu and Kashmir, comprising modern day Ladakh, Baltistan, Aksai Chin, and until 1901, Gilgit and Astore. With an area of around 45,762 square miles (118,520 km^{2}) in 1941, it comprised more than half of the princely state.

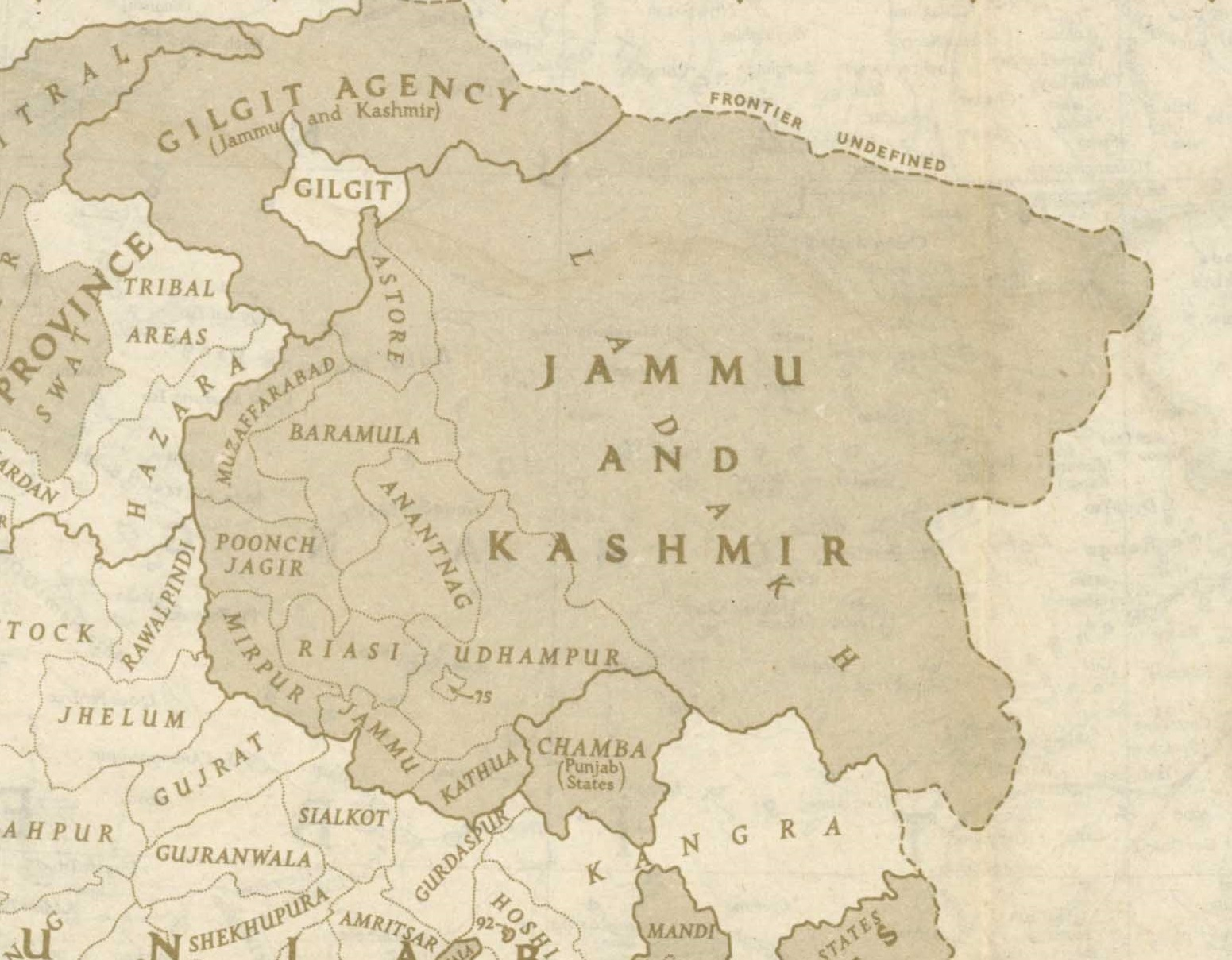
Ladakh Wazarat in 1946.

Ladakh and Baltistan had been conquered by the Dogra general Zorawar Singh during 1835–1840. Gulab Singh, the first maharaja of Jammu and Kashmir, was confirmed on his possession of these regions by the British under the 1846 Treaty of Amritsar. The administrative setup of Ladakh Wazarat itself is dated to 1860s, during the governship of Mehta Basti Ram, while the Wazarat (alternatively translated to district or province) of Ladakh was established only in 1889. Before it the local administration was in the hands of the local rajas. The official appointed to Ladakh was known as Wazir-i-Wazarat, and his status was similar to the governors of other districts of the state.

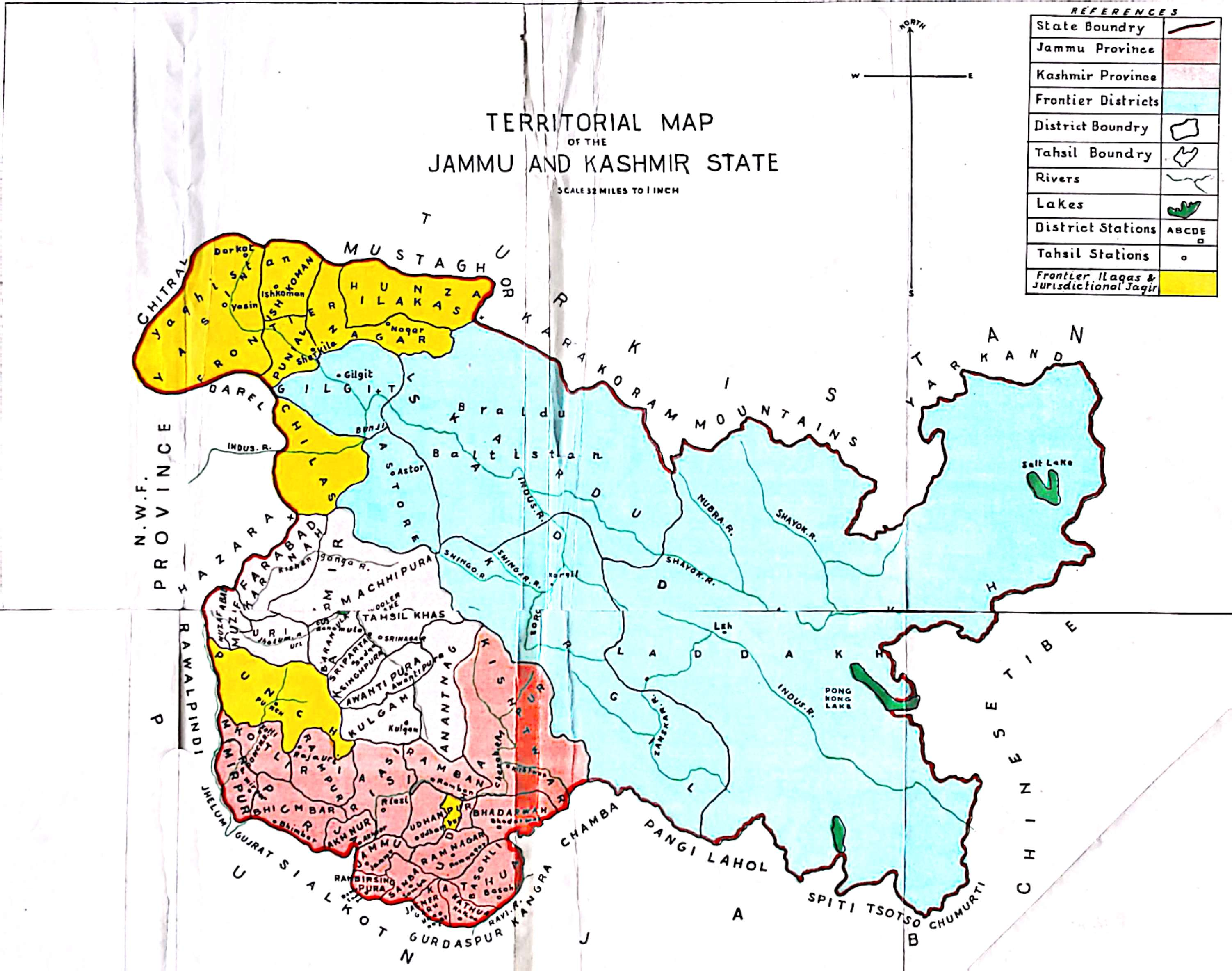
Ladakh Wazarat in 1939, subdivided into the tehsils of Leh, Skardu and Kargil.

Ladakh Wazarat was a district of the Jammu province until 1901, when the Frontier District Wazarat was abolished and the then existing unit was divided into Gilgit Wazarat (comprising Gilgit and Astore) and Ladakh Wazarat. A new tehsil, Kargil, was created from the Purig and Kharmang ilaqas of Skardu and the Zanskar ilaqa of Kishtwar district. The Wazir-i-Wazarat was made directly accountable to the Revenue Minister.

After the First Indo-Pakistani war in 1948 parts of the Ladakh Wazarat, containing Skardu Tehsil and a portion of Kargil Tehsil, came under Pakistani control, with Indian control over the remainder. Aksai Chin came under the Chinese control after the Sino-Indian War of 1962.

== List of Wazir-i-wazarat ==
Following is the list of Wazir-i-wazarat appointed at Ladakh:

- Mehta Basti Ram (1847–1860)
- Mehta Mangal (1860–1865)
- Sayyid Ali Akbar (1865–1868)
- Frederick Drew (1868–1871)
- William Johnson (1871–1882)
- Pandit Kishan Kaul (1882–1888)
- Sardar Muhammad Akbar Khan (1888–1891)
- Diwan Urjan Nath (1891–1893)
- Pandit Parkash Joo (1893–1895)
- Lala Bishan Das (1895–1900)
- Pandit Lachman Das (1900–1901)
- Pandit Vaskak Dhar (1901–1903)
- Munshi Faqir Chand (1903–1906)
- Chowdhary Khushi Mohammad (1906–1908)
- Sham Lal (1908–1909)
- Sultan Khan (1909–1910)
- Hashmat Ullah Khan (1910–1912)
- Janak Singh (1912–1913)
- Trilik Chand (1913–1919)
- Dewan Munshi Lal (1919–1921)
- Wazir Feroz Chand (1921–1926)
- Pandit Shri Ram (1926–1929)
- Niranjan Lal (1929–33)
- Rao Rattan Singh (1933–38)
- Chowdhary Faiz Ullah Khan (1938–40)
- Dhruv Singh (1940–43)
- Ramesh Chander (1943–46)
- Bishmamber Nath Jutshi (1946–)

== Sources ==
- Bloeria, Sudhir S. (2021). Ladakh in the Twentieth Century. Vij Books India Pvt Ltd. ISBN 978-93-89620-84-9.
- Dani, Ahmad Hasan (1991) [1989]. History of Northern Areas of Pakistan (2nd ed.). Islamabad: National Institute of Historical and Cultural Research, Quaid-i-Azam University. pp. 6, 419, 420. ISBN 978-969-415-016-1.
