= 1863 Yasin massacre =

Massacre in Gilgit-Baltistan, Pakistan

- Location: Yasin Valley (present-day Gilgit-Baltistan, Pakistan)
- Date: Spring 1863
- Target: Yasini Yashkuns
- Attack type: mass murder, mass rape, immolation, plundering
- Deaths: 1,200–2,000 (in initial massacre): 2,000–3,000 enslaved, many of whom died of starvation en route to Kashmir
- Perpetrators: Dogra soldiers; Pashtun mercenaries from Swat and Buner

The Yasin massacre occurred in 1863 at the Yasin Valley (present-day Gilgit-Baltistan, Pakistan). The invading Dogra army of princely state of Jammu and Kashmir killed over two thousand Yashkuns and enslaved several thousands others, many of whom died en route to Kashmir.

== Background ==
Yasin Valley, located in the northern fringes of present-day Gilgit-Baltistan, is chiefly populated by Burushaski and Khowar speaking Yashkuns. It was a stronghold of Khushwaqt dyansty. The Khushwaqt ruler Gohar Aman had expelled Dogras from Gilgit in 1852 by inflicting a defeat over Dogra commander Bhup Singh who was killed along with 1,200 of his troops. After his death in 1860, the maharaja of Kashmir Ranbir Singh sent an army consisting of 9,000 infantry and 3,000 cavalry under Zoraweru Singh, Hoshiara Singh, Jawahar Singh and Pashtun mercenaries under Samad Khan Khyberi to avenge the defeat. They were joined by local chiefs, Asmat Khan of Yasin and Isa Bahadur of Punial, who had been resentful of Gohar Aman confiscating their estates.

== Massacre ==
The Dogra troops reached Yasin in the spring of 1863. Yasinis were taken by surprise and took refuge in Madoori fort in the valley. According to George W. Hayward, who visited the valley in 1870, the Kashmir forces ensured Yasinis of their safety once they had laid down their weapons. But after the capitulation of the fort, the inhabitants were massacred. According to Hayward, 1,200 to 1,400 men, women and children were killed, with another 2,000 being enslaved and taken away to Srinagar and Jammu, several hundreds of whom died of starvation on the way. According to Gottlieb Wilhelm Leitner who met the eyewitnesses of the massacre in 1866, over 2,000 people were killed and 3,000 (mostly women) were enslaved and sold in Kashmir. After the massacre villages in Yasin were burnt and laid to waste. Both also narrate incidents of mass rapes. Hayward published an article in The Pioneer on 9 May 1870, in which he claimed that he saw charcoal turned bones where about forty women were burnt alive by Dogra soldiers. He also reported counting skulls of 147 children, in addition to finding 400 sets of skeletal remains at another place, as well as conversing with survivors who lost their relatives. According to Hayward, a number of Yasini women were still concubines of their captors in Srinagar and Jammu. These disclosures reportedly caused embarrassment for Lord Mayo, the then Viceroy of India, who called Hayward's actions as "irresponsible", and a great deal of anger among the Kashmir state officials.
