= Sher Qilla =

Pakistani village

Sherqilla
- Town
- Country: Islamic Republic of Pakistan
- Administrative units of Pakistan: Gilgit-Baltistan
- District: Ghizer
- Elevation: 2,000 m (6,600 ft)
- Time zone: UTC+5:30 (PST)
  - Summer (DST): +5
- Postal code: 15101

Sher Qilla or Sherqilla (Urdu: شیر قلعہ) is a village in Ghizer District, 38 kilometres (24 miles) from Gilgit, Pakistan. The Ghizer District, established in 1974, forms the westernmost region of the Gilgit-Baltistan region of Pakistan.

Sherqilla has two main bridges which connect the Ghizer Road with Sherqilla, one is wooden bridge dating to 1990s while the other is RCC bridge built in May 2020. Sherqilla sees huge influx of tourists and cargo vehicles. The village has several schools, including a government boys high school, a government girls high school, a pilot school, and The Aga Khan Higher Secondary School.

Sherqilla Fort, also known as the Lion's Fort, was a historic fortress located near the riverbank of Sherqilla Village, Punial, Gilgit-Baltistan, Pakistan. Sherqilla Fort was approximately 380 years old and held strategic importance due to its location. Despite numerous attempts, various rulers failed to conquer the village, including Ali Sher Khan Ancha. In 1888, HRH Colonel Aqa Akbar Ali Shah of the Ayesho Family of Punial successfully laid siege to the village, forcing local ruler Raja Isa Bahadur of Katoor Dynasty to surrender on the fourth day. Subsequently, the fort was plundered and destroyed on HRH Colonel Aqa Akbar Ali Shah's orders. Today, only remnants of the fort exist. Visitors to the area can still view the remains.

== Gallery ==
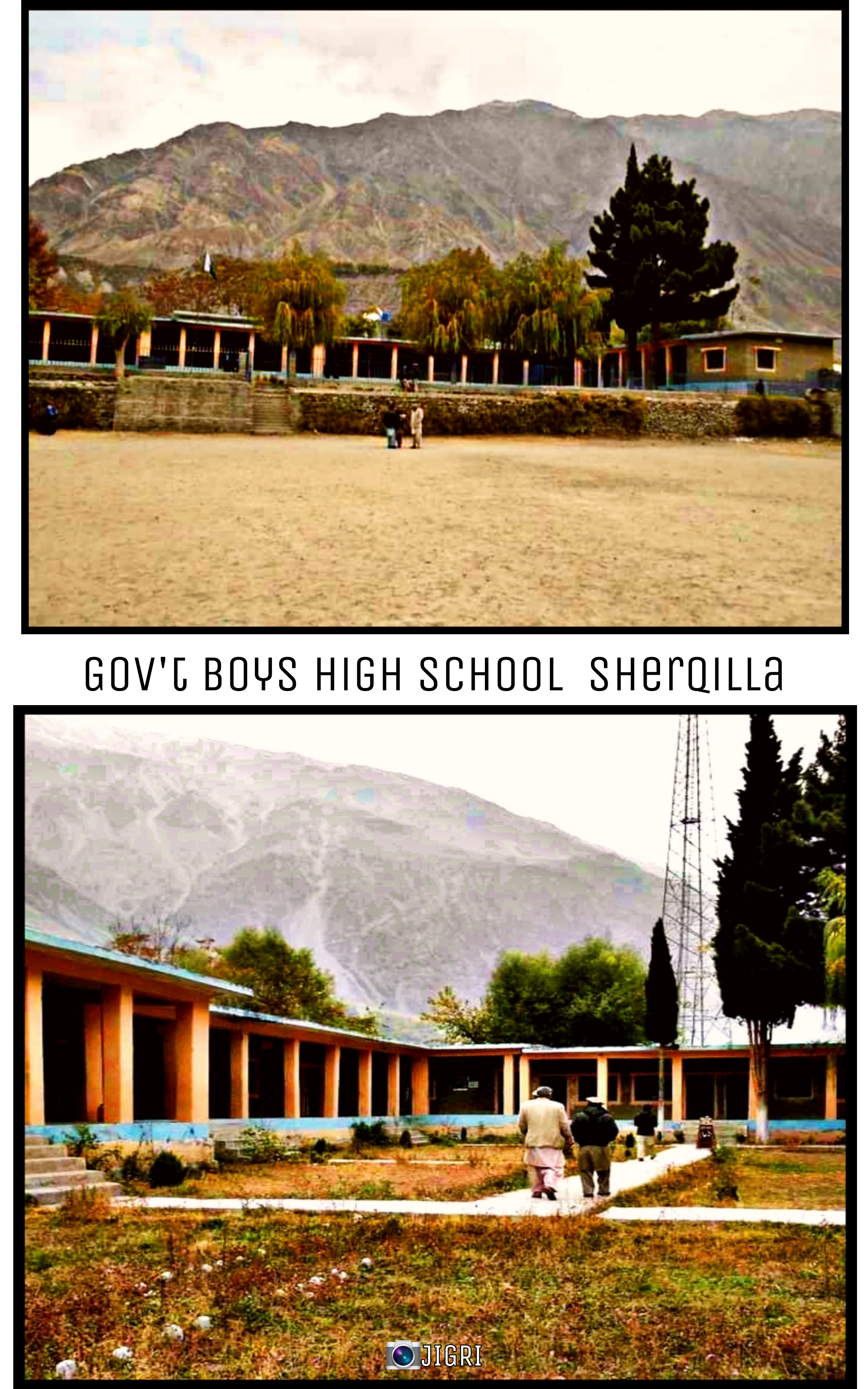
Government Boys High School, Sherqilla

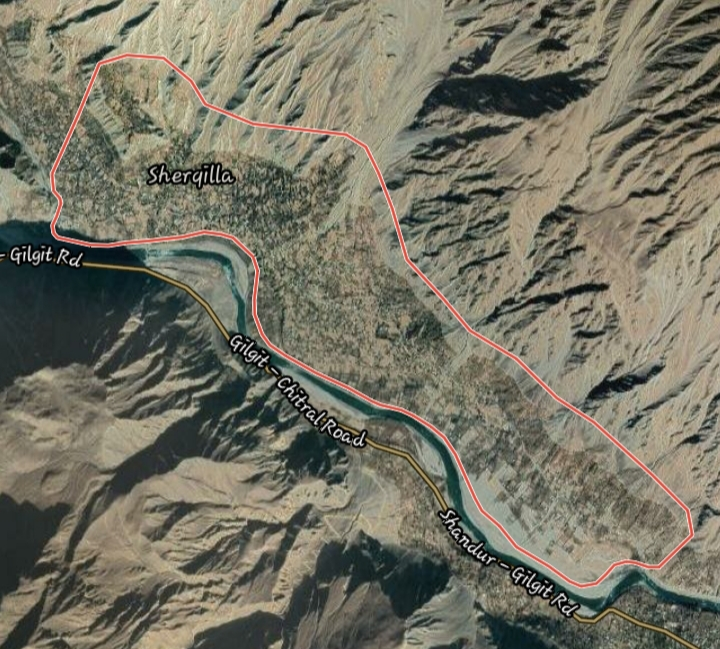
A satellite view of Sherqilla Valley

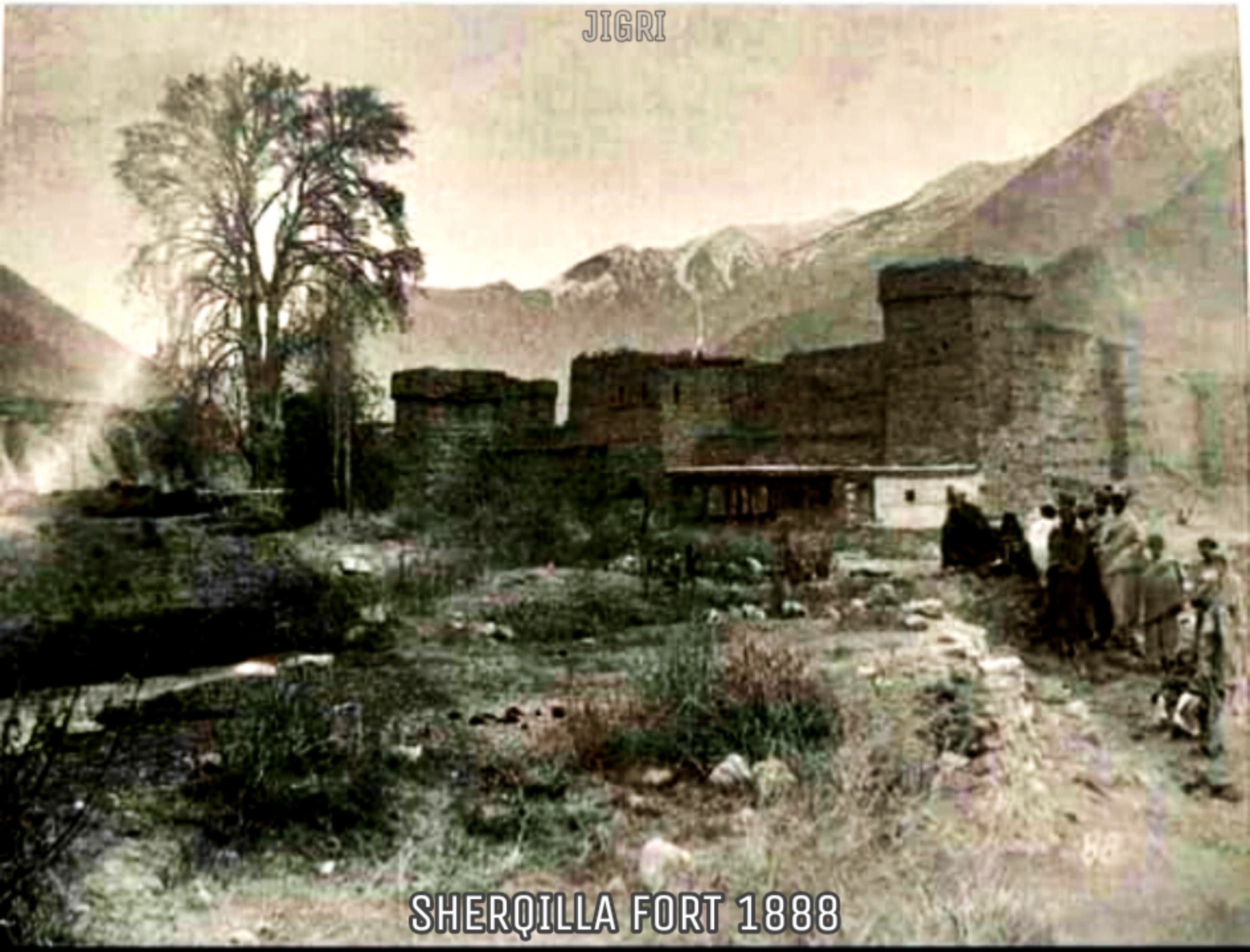
Fort of Sherqilla in 1888, picture taken by George Michael, a British surgeon.
