= Goharabad, Gilgit-Baltistan =

Goharabad گوہرآباد
- Village
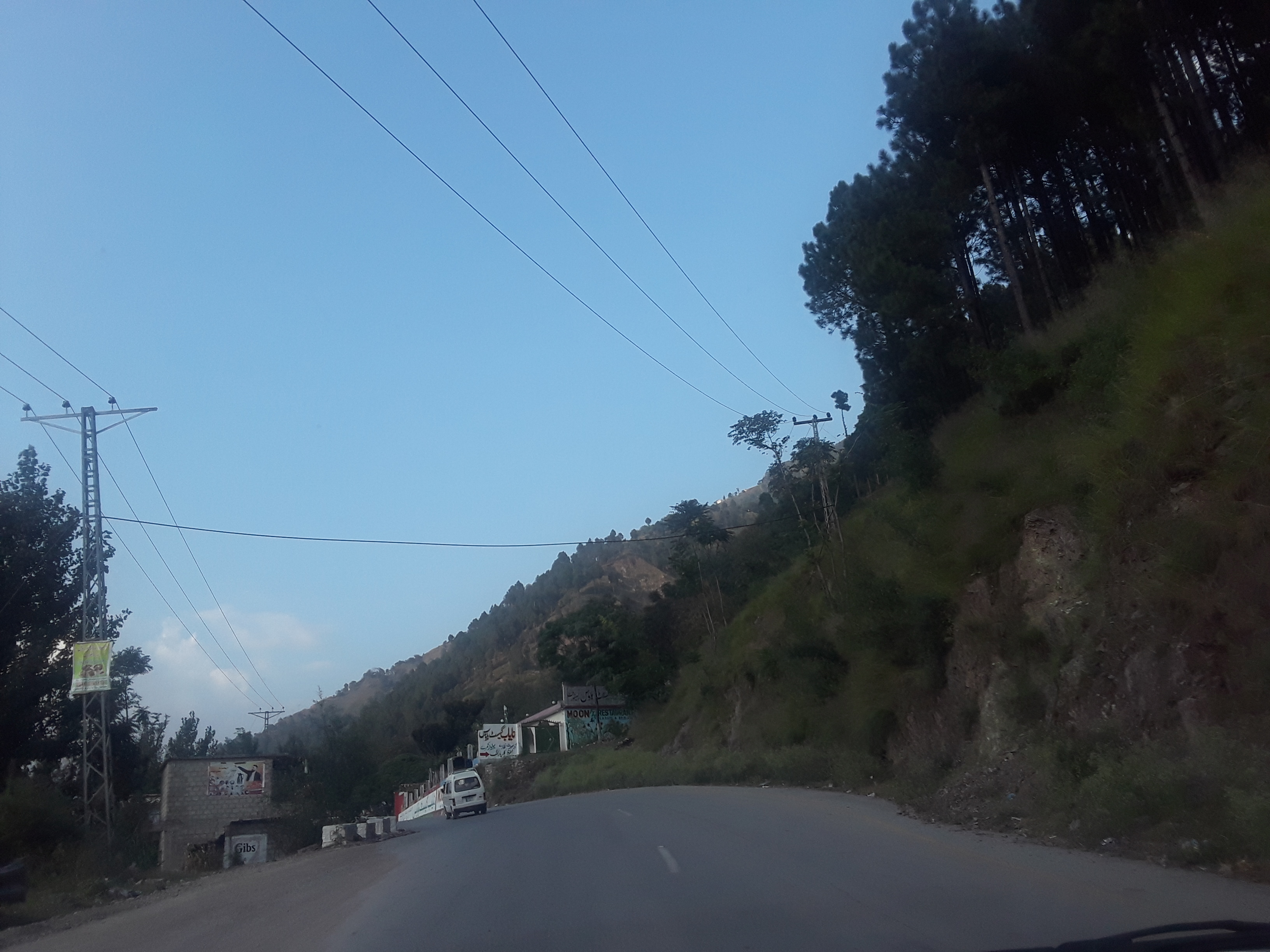
- Gohar Abad

- Location within Gilgit Baltistan
- Coordinates: 36.09836°N 73.97533°E
- Country: Pakistan
- Territories of Pakistan: Gilgit-Baltistan
- District: Diamer
- Time zone: UTC+05:00 (PKT)

Goharabad (Shina: گوہرآباد, Urdu: گوہرآباد) is a village in Diamer district, Gilgit-Baltistan, in Pakistan. It is famous for its valley.

== Goharabad Valley ==
Goharabad's valley is one of the most famous parts of Diamer district. Many tourists often visit the valley and hike up and meet the local people. Goharabad's old name was Gor and one of the independent republican state of Shinaka/Shinaki or Shinkari (Diamer & Kohistan) of upper Indus Valley .reference tribes of Hindukush,making of frontier

== Literacy Rate ==
There is only one school in Goharabad called Boys Middle School and it did not become a high school. Most kids study in Chilas, Gilgit, Abbottabad, or Islamabad. The school for girls is in bad shape even though it only opened in 2009.

HEALTH There is only one Hospital which consist of 10 beds 10-Bed Hospital Gohar-Abad .
