= Gohar Aman =

Ruler in Gilgit-Baltistan (1809 –1860)

Gohar Aman (گوہر امان; name also spelt Gauhar Aman and sometimes wrongly named as Gauhar Rahman; 1809–1860) was a member of Khushwaqt dynasty and the raja of principality of Yasin in present-day Gilgit-Baltistan, Pakistan, from 1841 until his death in 1860. At his peak, he ruled from Mastuj in Chitral and Ghizer. He is best known for his two decades-long struggle against the Dogra maharaja of Jammu and Kashmir.

== Early life ==
Gohar Aman was born in 1809 at Yasin into Khushwaqt dynasty, a branch of the Katoor dynasty of Chitral, which was founded towards the end of 16th century CE. When he was 16 years old, he married the daughter of raja of Gilgit, Azad Khan. With the aid of his father-in-law he marched towards Yasin and conquered it, becoming its ruler.

== Reign ==
=== Early reign ===
Gohar Aman next annexed the valley of Punial which was temporarily without any ruler. However he suffered a defeat at the hands of his brother Mir Aman, the raja of Mastuj, and was forced to seek refuge in Wakhan. With a small group of followers Gohar Aman invaded Tangir and conquered it. He retook Yasin in 1839, but lost it again. Next year the Mehtar of Chitral, his most powerful enemy, died. Gohar Aman conquered Yasin by defeating his brother, followed by his conquests in Punial, Ghizer, and Mastuj. By this time he had become the most powerful ruler in the Gilgit region.

=== First conquest of Gilgit and Sikh invasion ===
Gilgit, the capital of the long ruling Trakhān dynasty, was in a state of anarchy since the early 19th century. The raja of Nagar Tahir Shah had conquered Gilgit and made it a part of his principality. After his death his son Sikander Shah became ruler of Gilgit and Nagar. In 1841, Gohar Aman invaded Gilgit with 500 cavalry and 500 infantry, and deposed Sikander Shah. Karim Khan, the brother of deposed raja went to Kashmir to ask its governor on the behalf of Sikh Empire, Muhyuddin, for assistance. Muhyuddin dispatched Sikh troops numbering 1000 soldiers under the command of colonel Nathu Shah and colonel Mathura Das. Nathu Shah defeated Gohar Aman at Basin in 1842, three miles away from Gilgit. Gohar Aman retired to Punial. He defeated an invasion led by Mathura Das and negotiated a peace treaty with Nathu Shah, recognising his conquest and marrying his daughter with Nathu Shah. For a time, Gohar Aman ruled with peace in his domains. In 1847, the Mehtar of Chitral died. The next Mehtar Aman ul-Mulk had good relations with Gohar Aman. In Gilgit Karim Khan was appointed as nominal Raja, with real administration in the control of Nathu Shah.

=== Second conquest of Gilgit ===
In 1846, Jammu and Kashmir princely state was formed under British suzerainty with Gulab Singh as its maharaja. Nathu Shah transferred his allegiance to Gulab Singh as governor of Gilgit. He was killed fighting against the Mir of Hunza Ghazan Khan in 1848. By this time Gohar Aman had made up his mind to expel Dogras form the west bank of Indus. In 1851, the people of Chilas rose in revolt against the Dogra government. In putting down the rebellion Dogras lost 1,500 men but were successful, and a general massacre ensued. Some of the Chilasis went to ask for help from Gohar Aman. Gohar Aman formed alliance with the Mir of Hunza and led an army into Gilgit Valley in 1852. Here he faced 1,200 strong Dogra troops at a place now known as Bhup Singh ki Pari. Gohar Aman closed all passes out of the narrow valley; in the battle that ensued over 1,000 Dogra soldiers were killed while rest were taken prisoners. Next he besieged the Gilgit Fort garrisoned by Gurkha and Dogra soldiers. Around 300 men of the besieged garrison tried to flee to the nearby fort of Naupura but most were killed, with only a few managing to escape. The fort taken by storm and 300 of soldiers inside were killed with rest taken as prisoners, except for a Gurkha woman who managed to flee by jumping into Indus River and reached Srinagar. After these disastrous defeats Gulab Singh abandoned any efforts to reclaim areas beyond the east bank of Indus.

=== Later reign ===
After the conquest of Gilgit, Gohar Aman became the undisputed ruler of the valleys of Yasin, Ghizer, Mastuj, Darel, Tangir, Gilgit and Punial. He ruled until 1860. Shortly after his death Dogras recaptured Gilgit from his son. In 1863 they invaded and massacred the people of Yasin.

== Legacy ==
In Gilgit-Baltistan Gohar Aman is viewed as one of their greatest rulers, along with Ali Sher Khan Anchan. For over two decades he kept the expanding Dogra kingdom at bay. According to the historian Muhammad Yusuf Saraf, folklores commemorating his battles have been told for generations in the region. Gohar Aman has been described as "the stormy petrel of the frontier" by K. M. Panikkar. According to Ahmad Hasan Dani Gohar Aman restored the honour and prestige of the people of Gilgit.
