= Darel Valley =

Valley in Gilgit Baltistan, Pakistan

- Valley
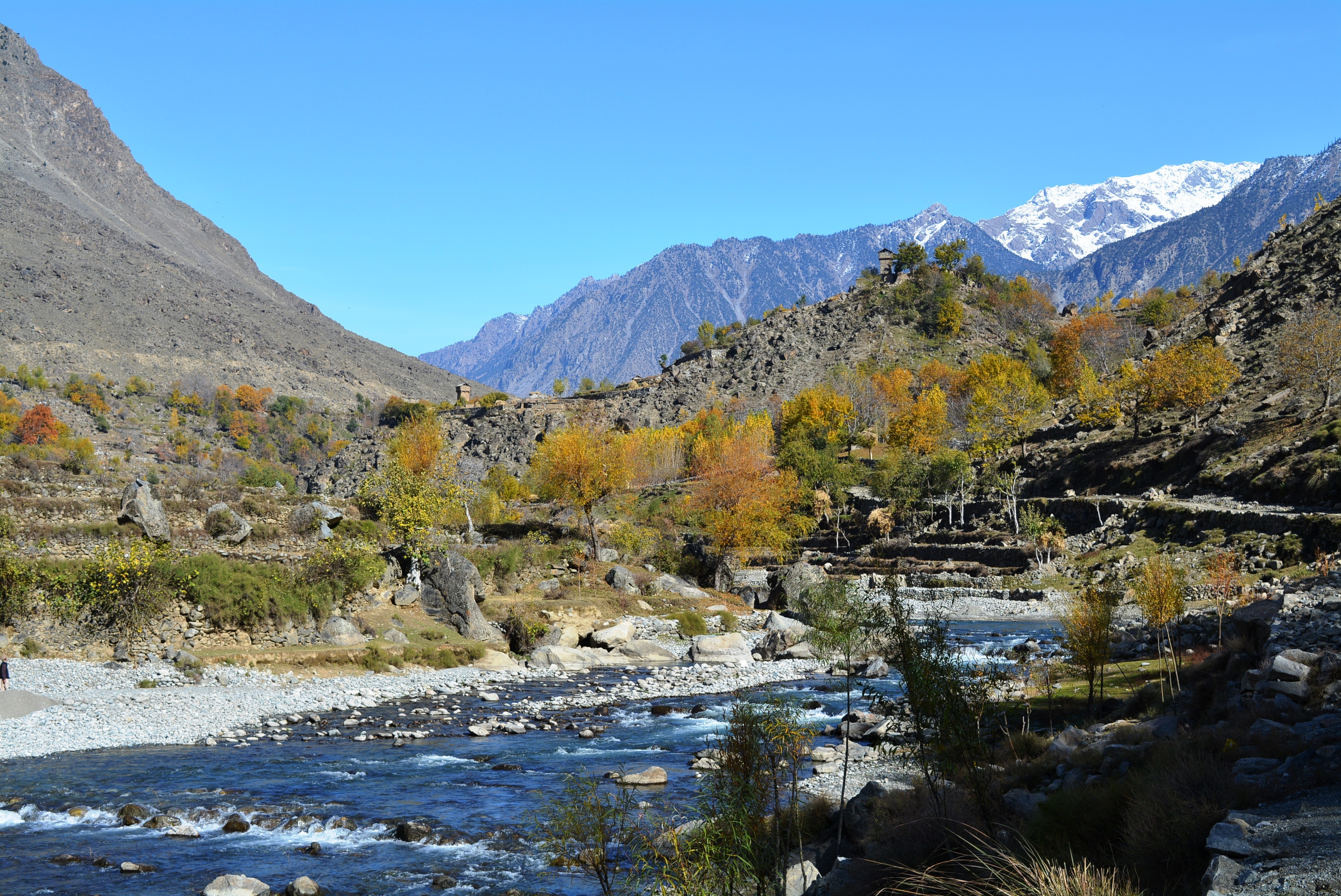
- Darel Valley photographed c. 2015
- Interactive map of Darel Valley
- Coordinates: 35.66092°N 73.61904°E
- Country: Pakistan
- Administrative unit: Gilgit–Baltistan
- District: Darel District
- Time zone: UTC+5:00 (PKT)

Darel Valley is a valley in the Darel District of the Pakistani-administered Gilgit–Baltistan. A river known by the same name, which is a tributary of the Indus River, flows through the entire length of the valley. At a distance south of the valley, the Indus River passes in the east-west direction.

Darel Valley holds villages containing archaeological remains from the Buddhist period, including worship places, monasteries, and fortresses, notably in the Phoguch village of the valley.

== See also ==
- Shatial

== Bibliography ==
- Dani, Ahmad Hasan (1989). History of Northern Areas of Pakistan (1st ed.). Islamabad: National Institute of Historical and Cultural Research. ISBN 978-96-94-15016-1. OCLC 21304054.
- Kalhoro, Z. A. (2021), "Monasteries, Mosques and Mystics of the Darel Valley", The Friday Times
- Khan, M. N. (1999). "Archaeological Discoveries in Darel Valley Muzot: An Iron Age Grave Culture Site". Ancient Pakistan. 13. Department of Archaeology – University of Peshawar: 109–119. ISSN 2708-4590.
