= Yasin Valley =

Valley in Gilgit-Baltistan

- Valley
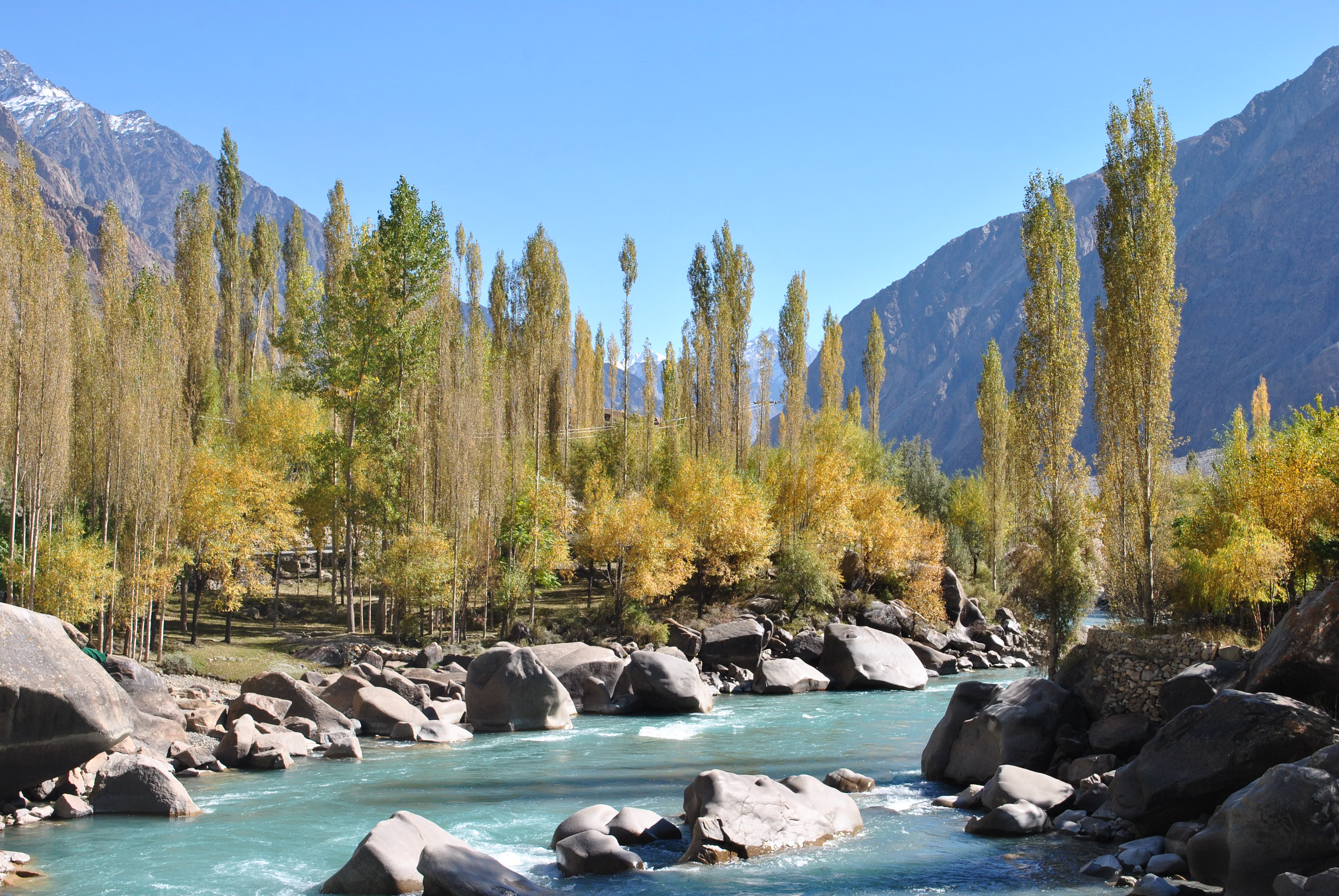
- Yasin River flowing within the valley

- Location in Pakistan
- Coordinates: 36°22′15″N 73°20′00″E
- Country: Pakistan
- Administrative unit: Gilgit Baltistan
- District: Gupis-Yasin District
- Time zone: UTC+5:00 (PKT)

Yasin Valley is a high-altitude mountain valley in the Hindu Kush mountain range, located along the Yasin River in the northern region of the Gupis-Yasin District in Gilgit-Baltistan, Pakistan. The valley is situated approximately 148 kilometers (92 miles) from the city of Gilgit, which serves as the capital of Gilgit-Baltistan. Within the valley's territory lies Yasin Tehsil, an administrative subdivision of the region.

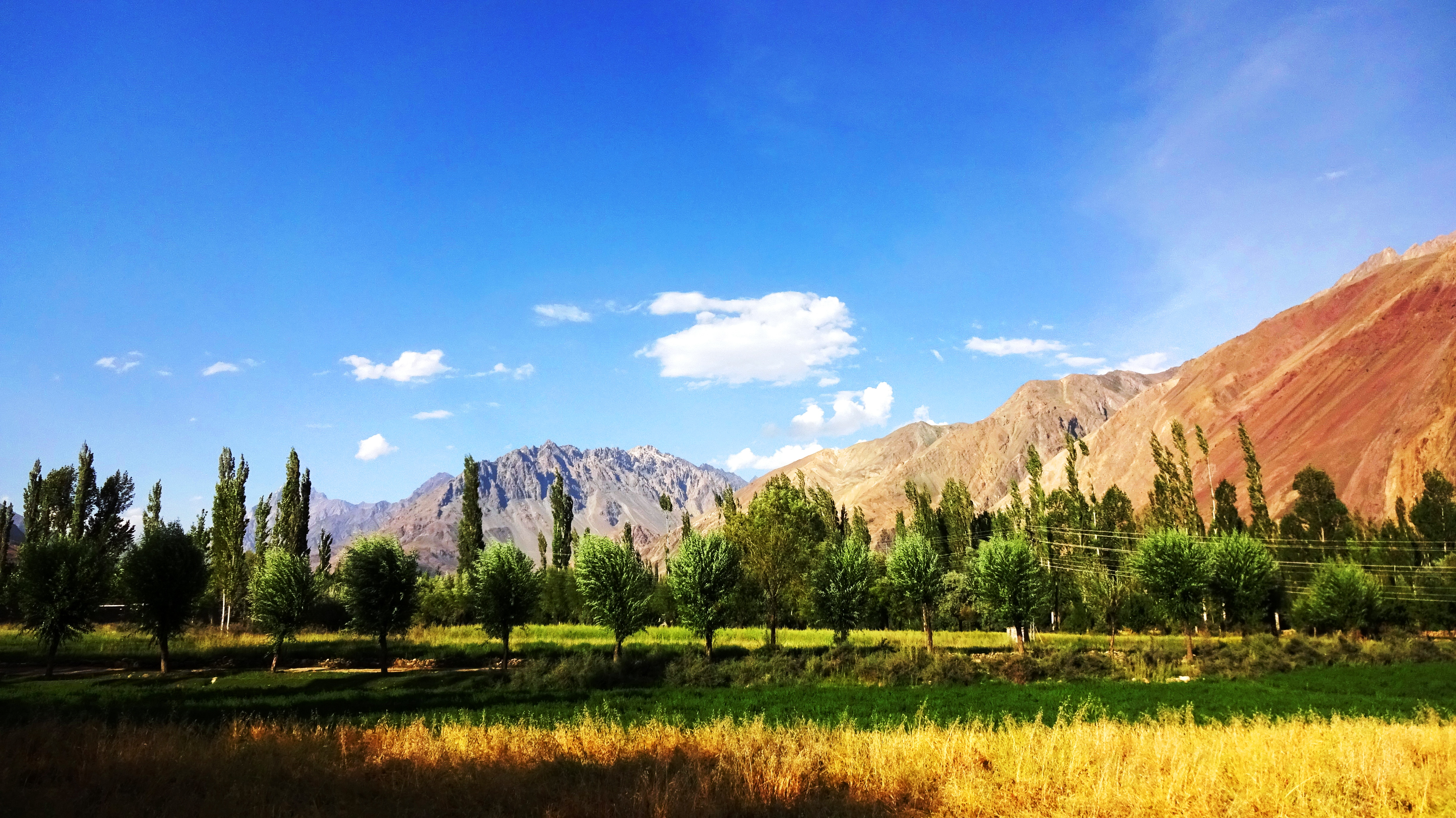
Yasin Valley in Summer

== History ==
Despite its sparse population, Yasin Valley has held strategic importance historically. This is due to the fact that it leads to a high mountain pass leading to the Yarkhun Valley and subsequently to the Broghil Pass in Chitral. These passes facilitate connectivity with the Wakhan Corridor in Afghanistan and further to Tajikistan.

Yasin Valley served as the administrative center of Worshigum, which was under the suzerainty of the Khushwaqt dynasty which originated in Chitral. The Mehtars of Yasin were great warriors and fought against the Sikhs and the Dogras of Kashmir under Gohar Aman. In 1863, Dogras invaded Yasin and massacred its people, thus bringing it under their suzerainty. In 1895, the British took control of the territory and made it part of the Gilgit Agency.

== People ==
The primary languages of Yasin Valley are Burushaski language and Khowar Language. English, Wakhi, and Shina are also widely understood.

The majority of the people in Yasin are Isma'ilis, who consider Aga Khan V their spiritual leader. However, people following other branches of both Sunni and Shia Islam also live in Yasin. Ethnically, the people of Yasin are of Burusho origin; however, there are some migrants from different parts of the country.

Havaldar Lalak Jan Shaheed who was given the Pakistan Military's highest award Nishan-e-Haider for his bravery in Kargil War in 1999, belonged to Hundur in Yasin valley.

== Geography ==
Yasin is separated from the Ishkoman Valley by a high mountain pass. To reach Yasin one must take the Karakoram Highway north from Islamabad, and then turn left to reach Gupis in Ghizar on Shandur Road then in few Kilometers from Gupis traverse to the right crossing the China Bridge on Ghizer River, one continues northwest to reach the Yasin Valley.

The part of the valley where Khowar is spoken is known in the Shina language as Arinah.

=== Passes ===
The Darkut Pass connects Yasin with Wakhan and Chitral, height 4,570 metres (14,990 ft), Buroghul pass connect Yasin with Brughol, height 3,798 metres (12,461 ft) while the Thoi Pass connects Yasin to Yarkhun Chitral, height 4,499 metres (14,760 ft). Assumber pass connects Yasin to Ishkoman. Darkot Pass is an historical pass which has been labelled as a restricted zone by the government of Pakistan. This pass used to be the shortest means of communication between the Amu Darya and Indus. Most tourism is along the Assumbur Pass to the Ishkoman Valley. one pass is from Darkot yasin to Thoi is called Ghamubar Pass 4,300 m that takes 3 beautiful days. Attar pass height 4,700 metres (15,400 ft) Connects Darkut with Ishkoman Valley and Attar Lake. Three passes (Nazbar, Zagar and Chumarkhan Pass) from Nazbar yasin connect to Mastuj Chitral, height 5,009 metres (16,434 ft), one pass from Bujayote Nala to Bawoshter Ghizat Shamaran, one other pass from Khaimet bar to Chitral.

== Gallery ==
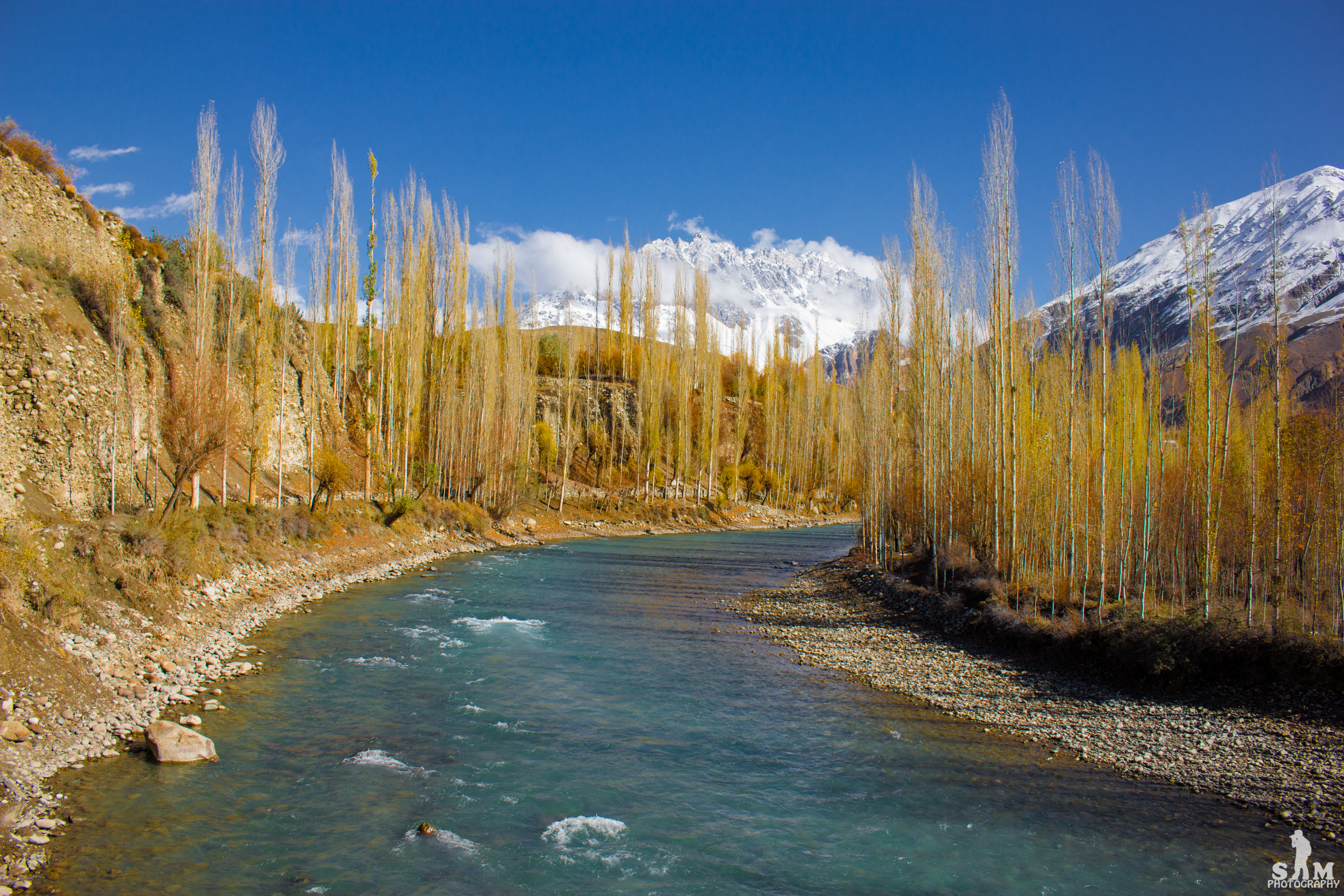

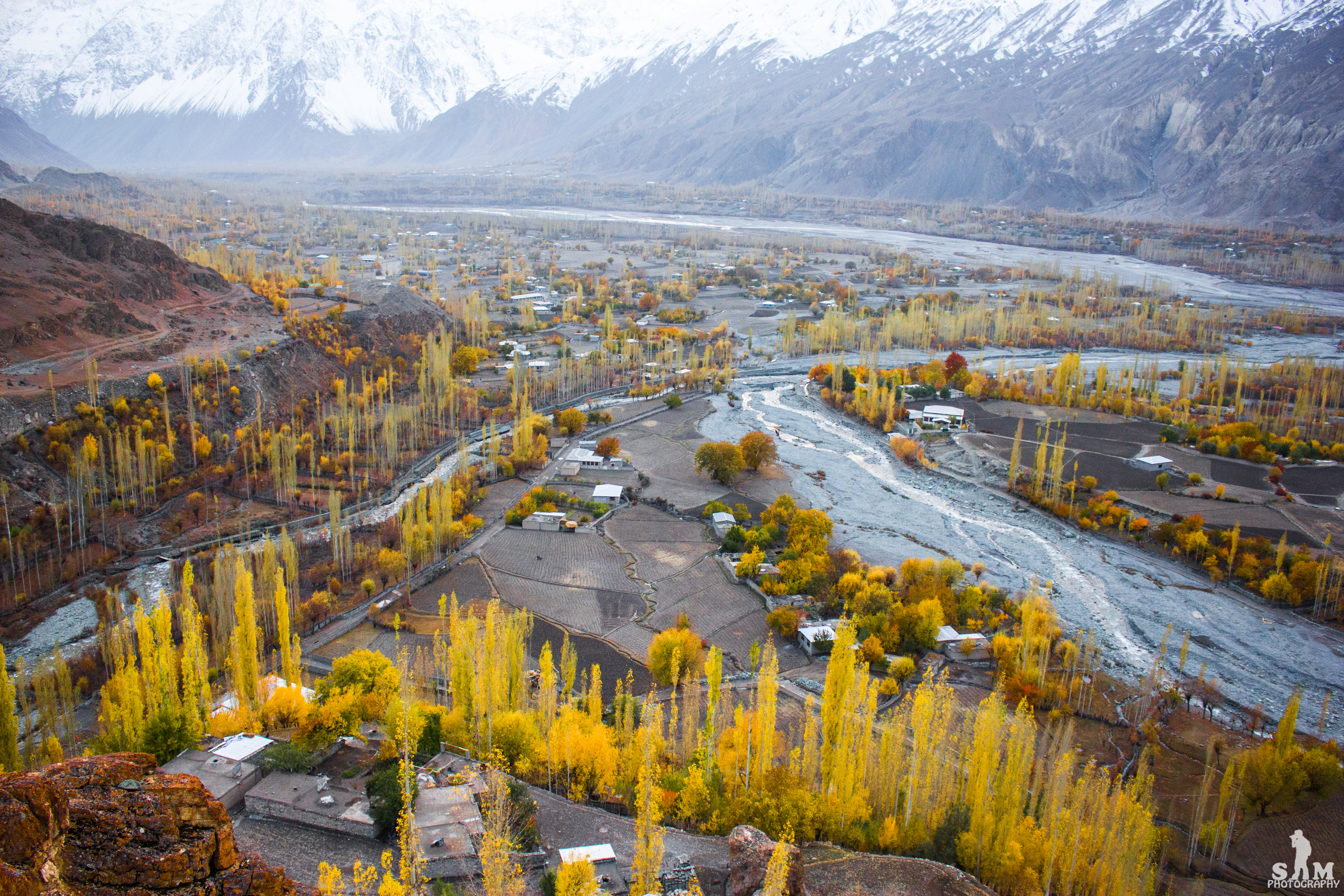
Sandi Village

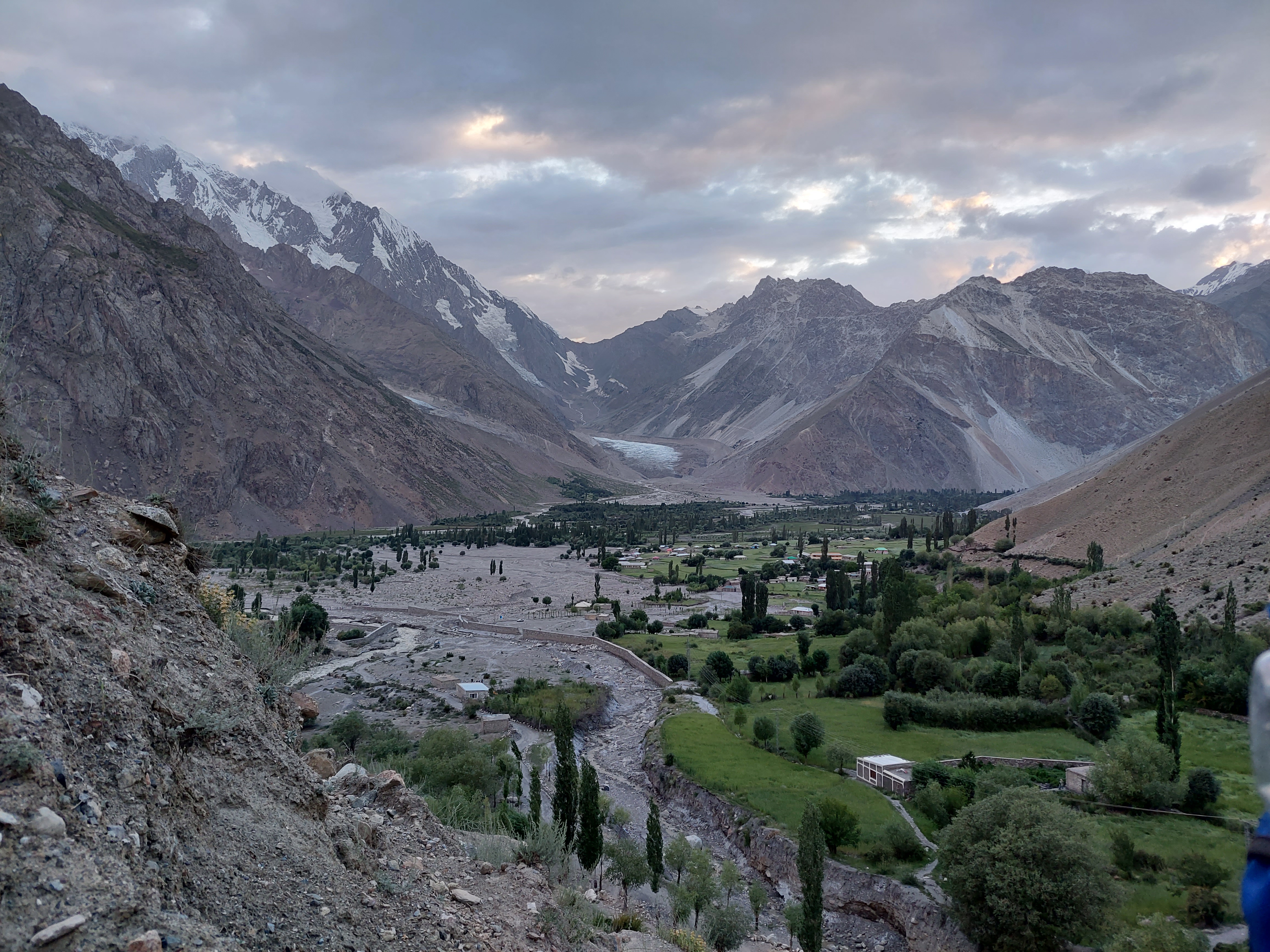
Darkot valley areal view form Attar pass side Yasin

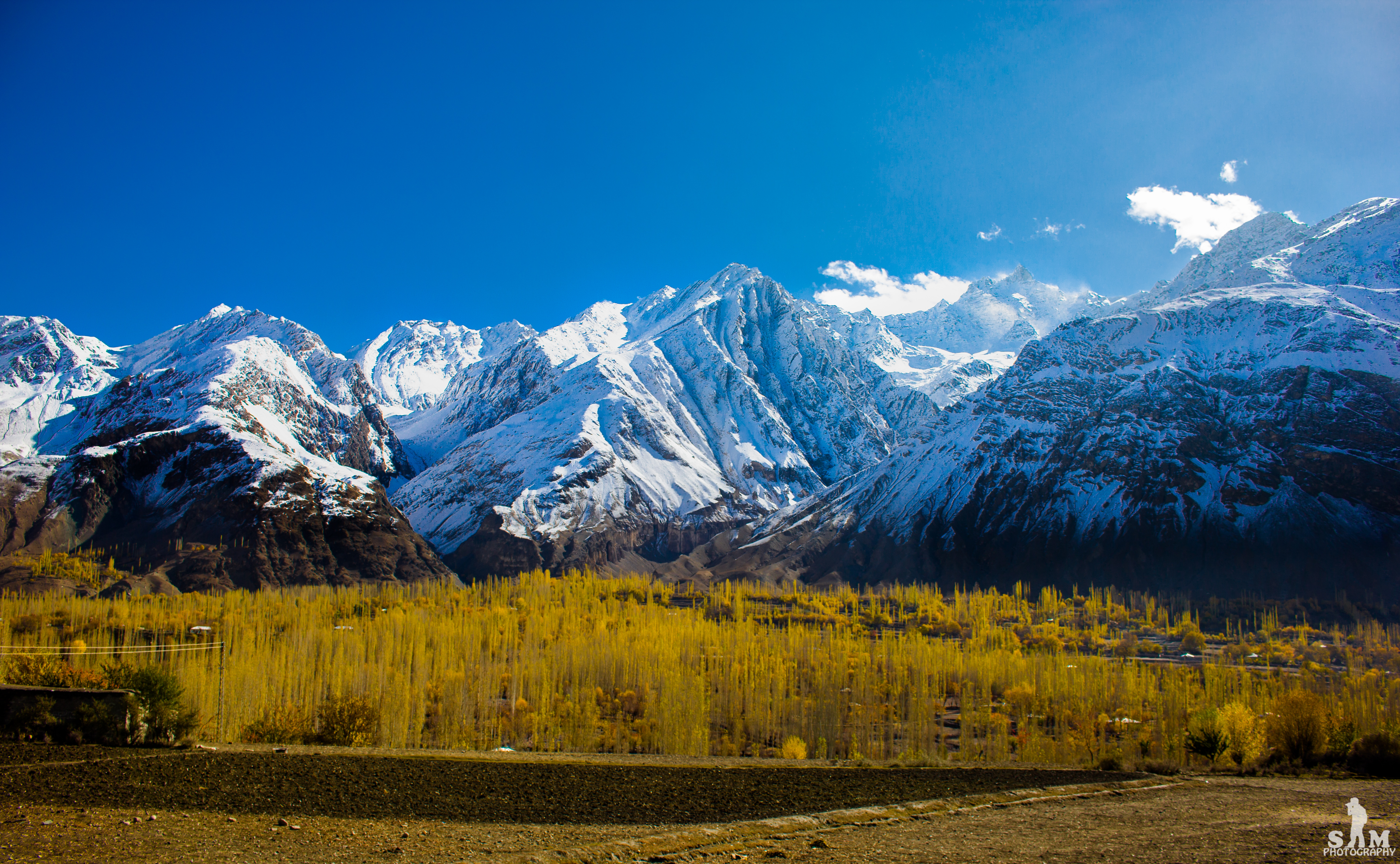

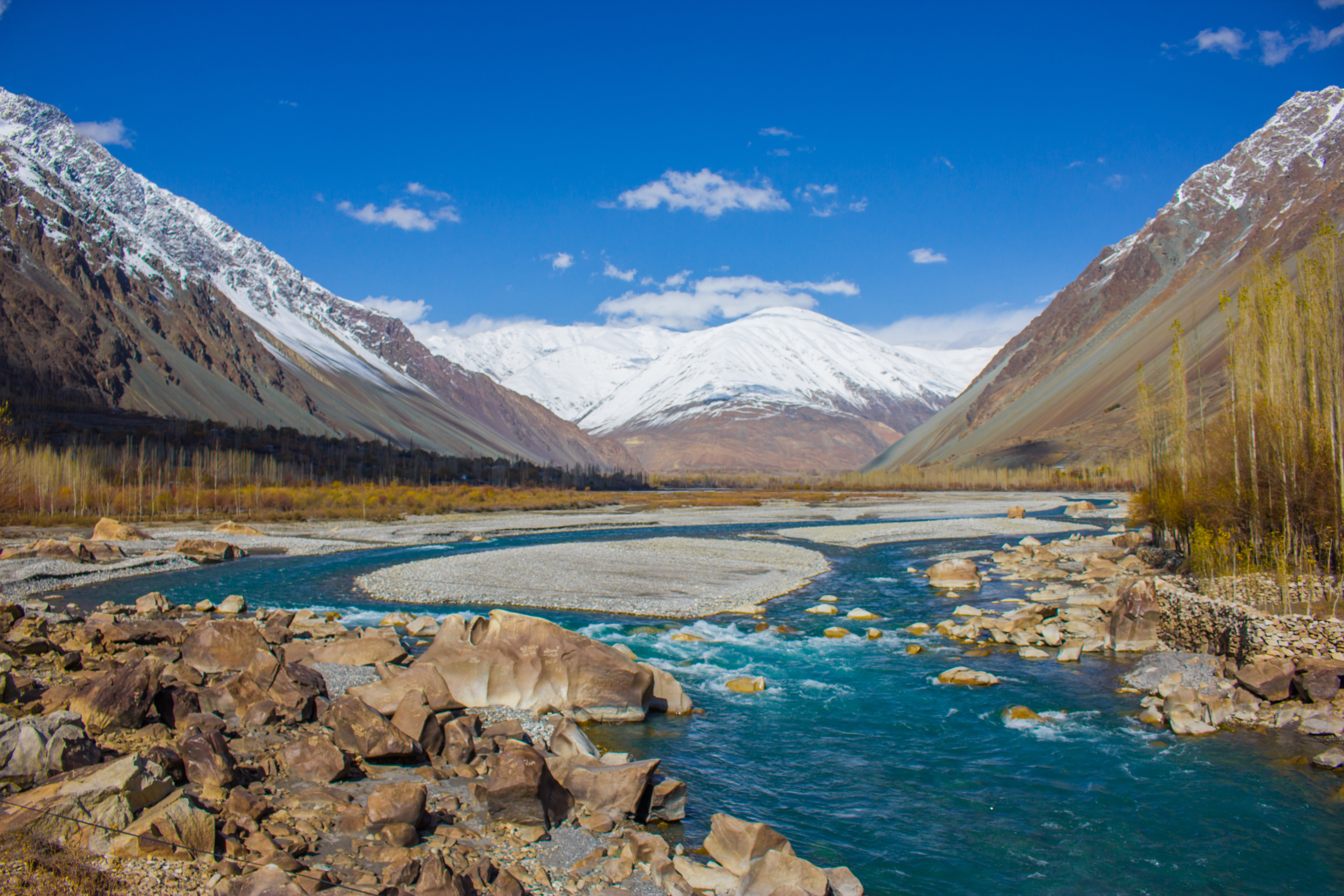

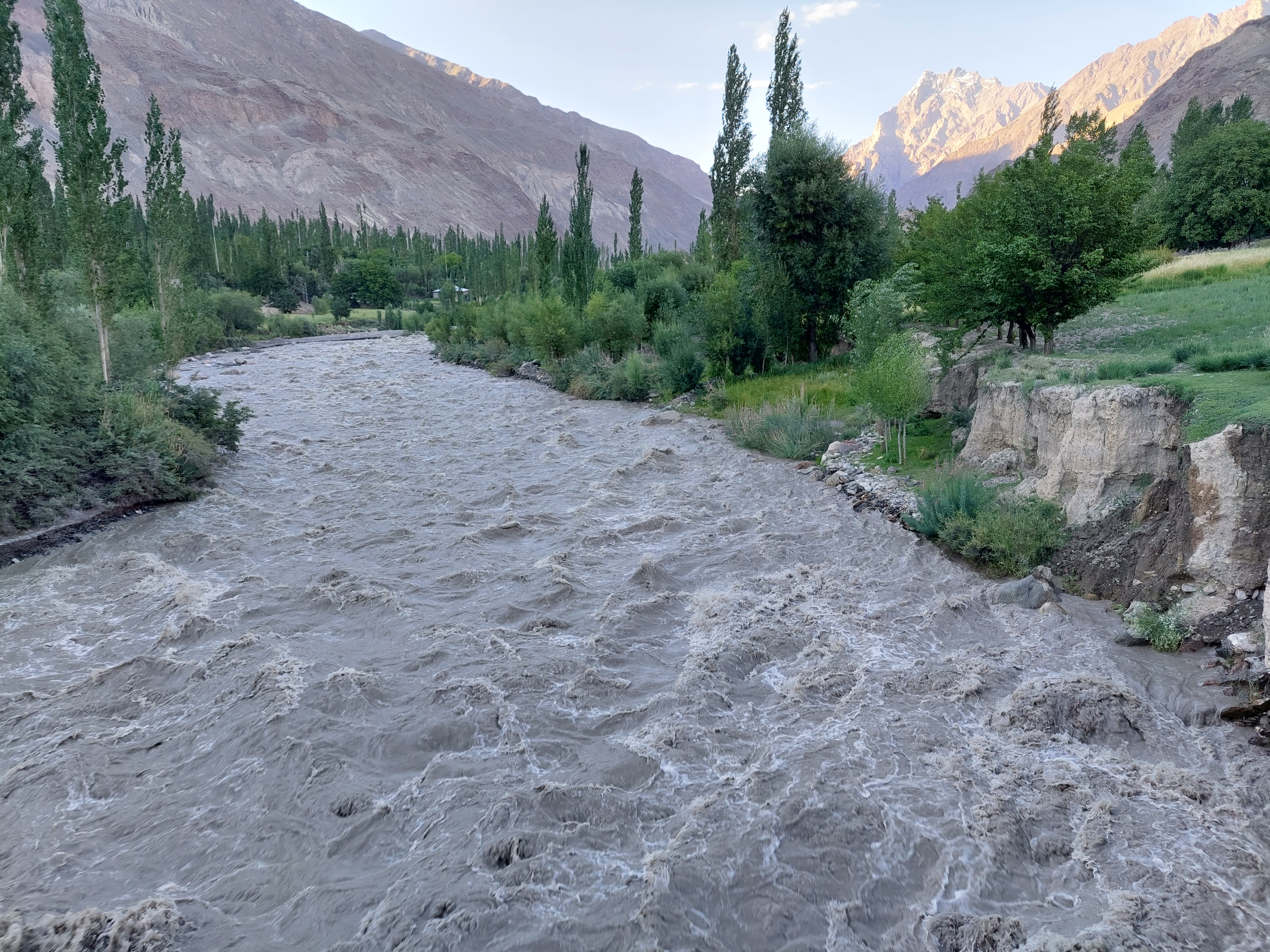
River Yasin cross Barkolti

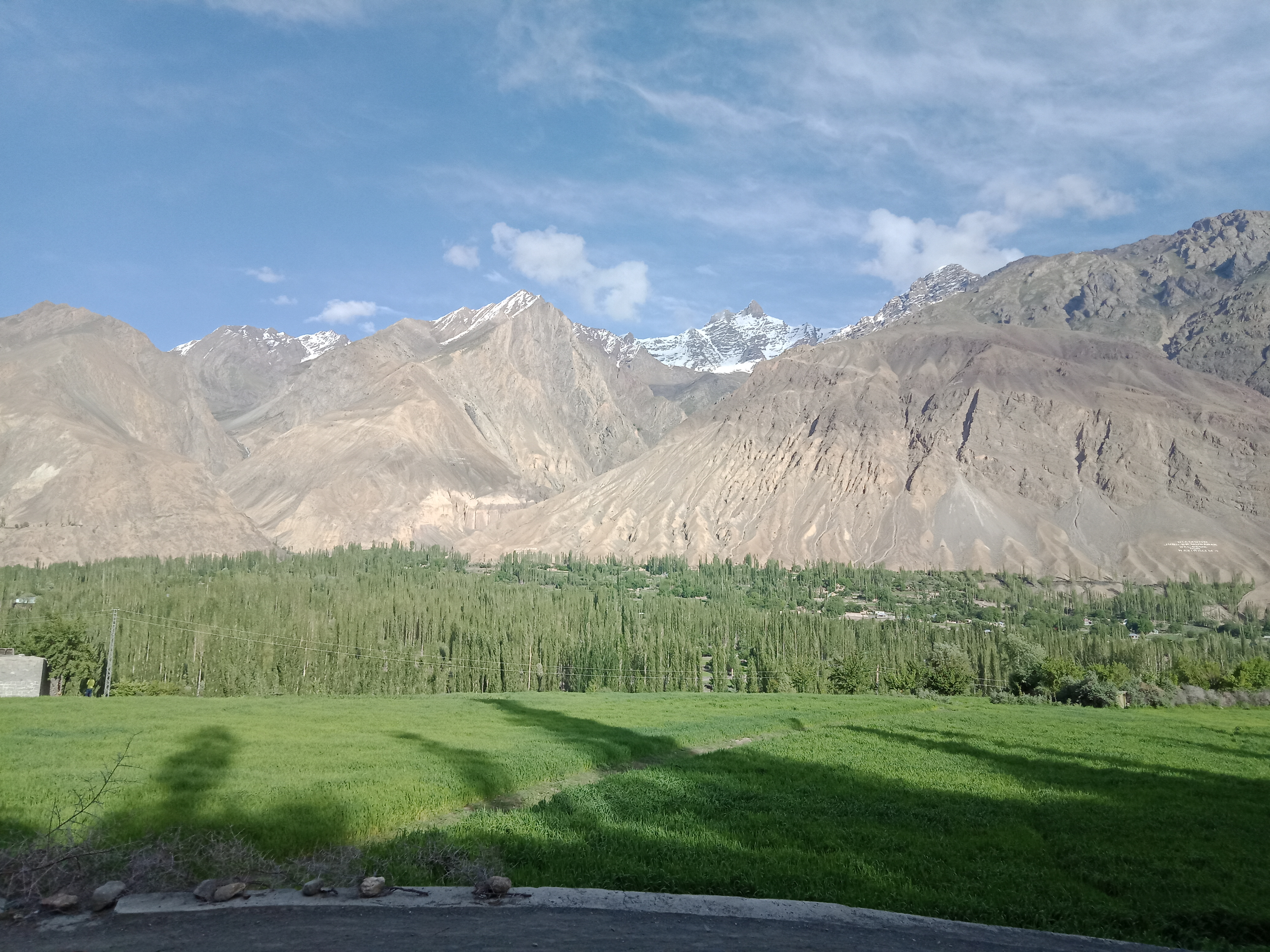
The lands of Yasin
