= Punial =

Valley in Pakistan

Punial (Urdu: پنیال) is a broad and fertile tract along the middle coarse of Gilgit River, south of where Ishkoman Valley opens into Gilgit Valley. Situated in a mountainous valley at an elevation of about 5000–9000 feet in Ghizer District, it contains several settlements such as Gahkuch and Sherqilla, and is well-known for fruits production.

== History ==
The term "Punial" has its roots in the Shina language, where it carries two significant meanings: "fertile land" and "bucket of fruits." The region saw Indo-Aryan migrations. The population of Punial gradually transitioned to Buddhism.

Before the establishment of the Punial rajas, governance in the area operated under a tribal head system, wherein various tribal leaders presided over their respective groups. Among the ruling families, the Brush family from Punial emerged, successfully establishing Punial as an independent state. Brush family was a branch of Khushwaqt dynasty of Yasin. Sifat Bahadur chose Gahkuch as the capital. In 1860, Isa Bahadur, the ruler of Punial, was recognised by Dogra dynasty of Jammu and Kashmir as hereditary raja of Punial.

Raja Nasir ul-Din, also known as Jan Alam, was the grandson of Isa Bahadur and the final ruler of the dynasty in Punial, where he adhered to the Sunni sect of Islam. Throughout his reign, Jan Alam faced significant challenges, notably enduring two of the three uprisings that erupted against what many considered the oppressive governance imposed by the local populace of Punial. The first of these uprisings took place in 1895.

The second uprising arose in 1936, instigated by Raja Anwar Khan, Jan Alam's father, who sought to curb the influence of his cousin, Khan Bahadur.

The Syeds, comprising the father and uncle of Pir Karam Ali Shah, had been steadfast supporters of the Ayasho family of Hunza in Punial since the 1800s. In 1974, Prime Minister Zulfikar Ali Bhutto implemented nationwide reforms that abolished the princely states.

== Settlements ==
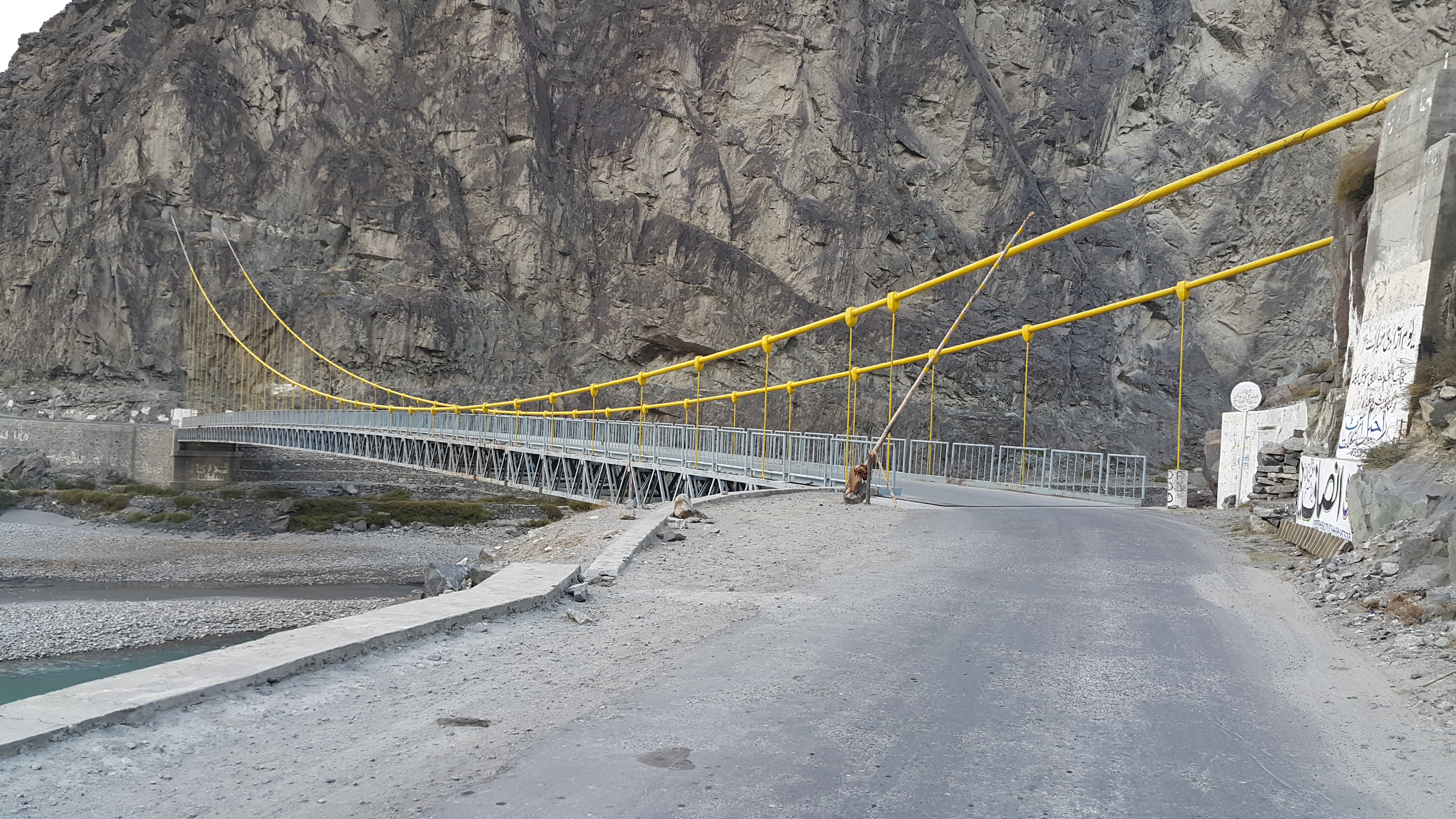
Kanchey Bridge, which connects Kanchey valley with Gahkuch located near Gahkuch City. A development work of the Ayesho family undertaken in 2006.

Gahkuch is the main town, and the district headquarters. Sher Qilla is another large village in the Punial Valley. The distance between two is 40 km and time required to reach there is about 45 min to 1 hour.

== Forts ==
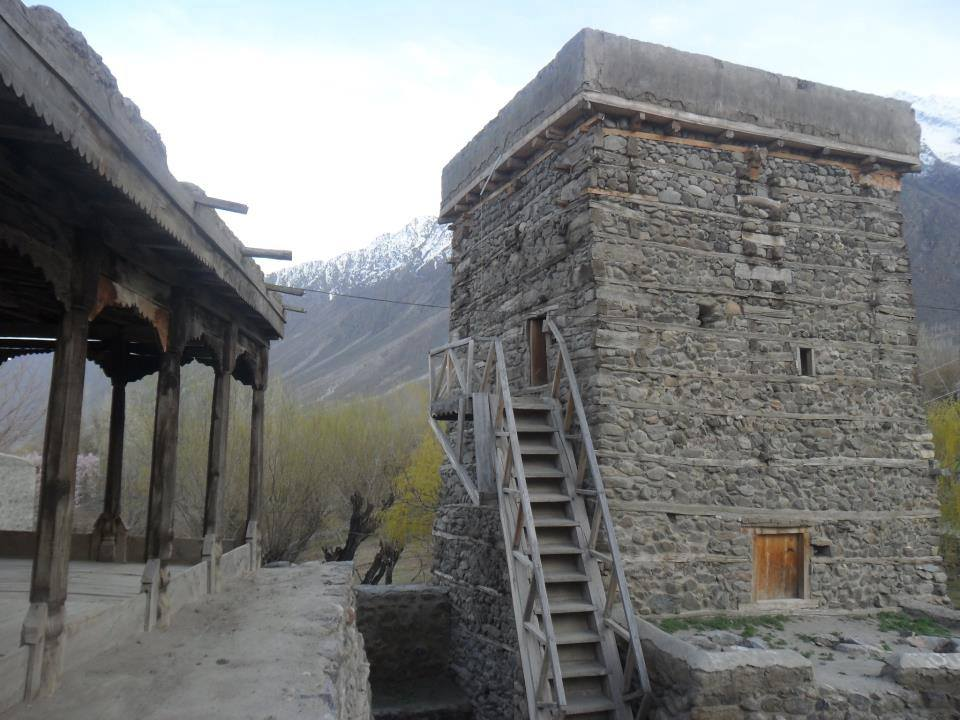
The newly renovated shooting tower next to the prayer hall of the fort. The fort originally had 6-8 towers all protected by well mounted cannons but only one of them can be seen today.

Punial Valley has several forts, such as Gahkuch Fort, Sherqilla Fort and Gupis Fort.

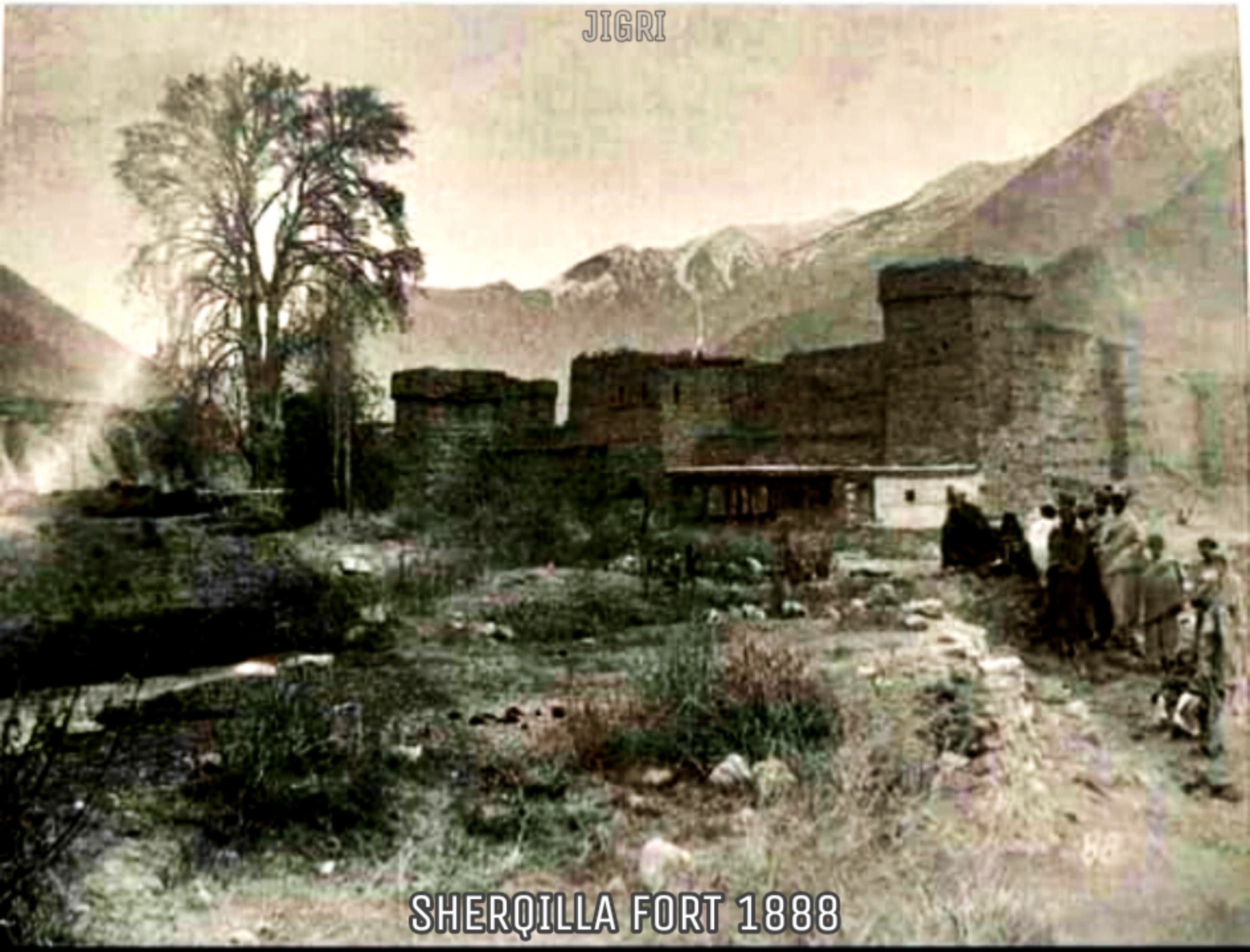
The last surviving picture of the Sherqilla Fort before its destruction by the Ayesho's in 1888

Gupis Fort, situated in the picturesque Gupis Valley of Gilgit-Baltistan, Pakistan, is a 17th-century historic fortress built by Raja Bahadur Khan during the reign of the Punial State. In 1888, following the conquest of Sherqilla, Aqa Akbar Ali Shah of the Ayesho Family captured the fort and subsequently formed the Punial Levis, a personal bodyguard force that later evolved into the Gilgit Baltistan Scouts. Thereafter, the fortress served as the official residence of the Crown Prince of Punial State, a guest house for foreign officers and visitors, and the rear headquarters of Punial Levis, Gilgit Baltistan Scouts, and Northern Light Infantry. Additionally, reports suggest it was utilized for training purposes, with its ground-level construction indicating potential use as a storage facility. The fort's architecture reveals heavy fortification, featuring armoured towers and walls, allowing for easy counterfire from all four sides, making invasion extremely challenging. Today, Gupis Fort attracts tourists due to its scenic location amidst the Himalayas, rich cultural heritage, and historical significance, and is located in the Ghizer district of Gilgit-Baltistan, Pakistan.

== See also ==
- Gilgit Agency
