= Sheosar Lake =

Lake in Gilgit-Baltistan, Pakistan

- ݜیوسر (Shina)
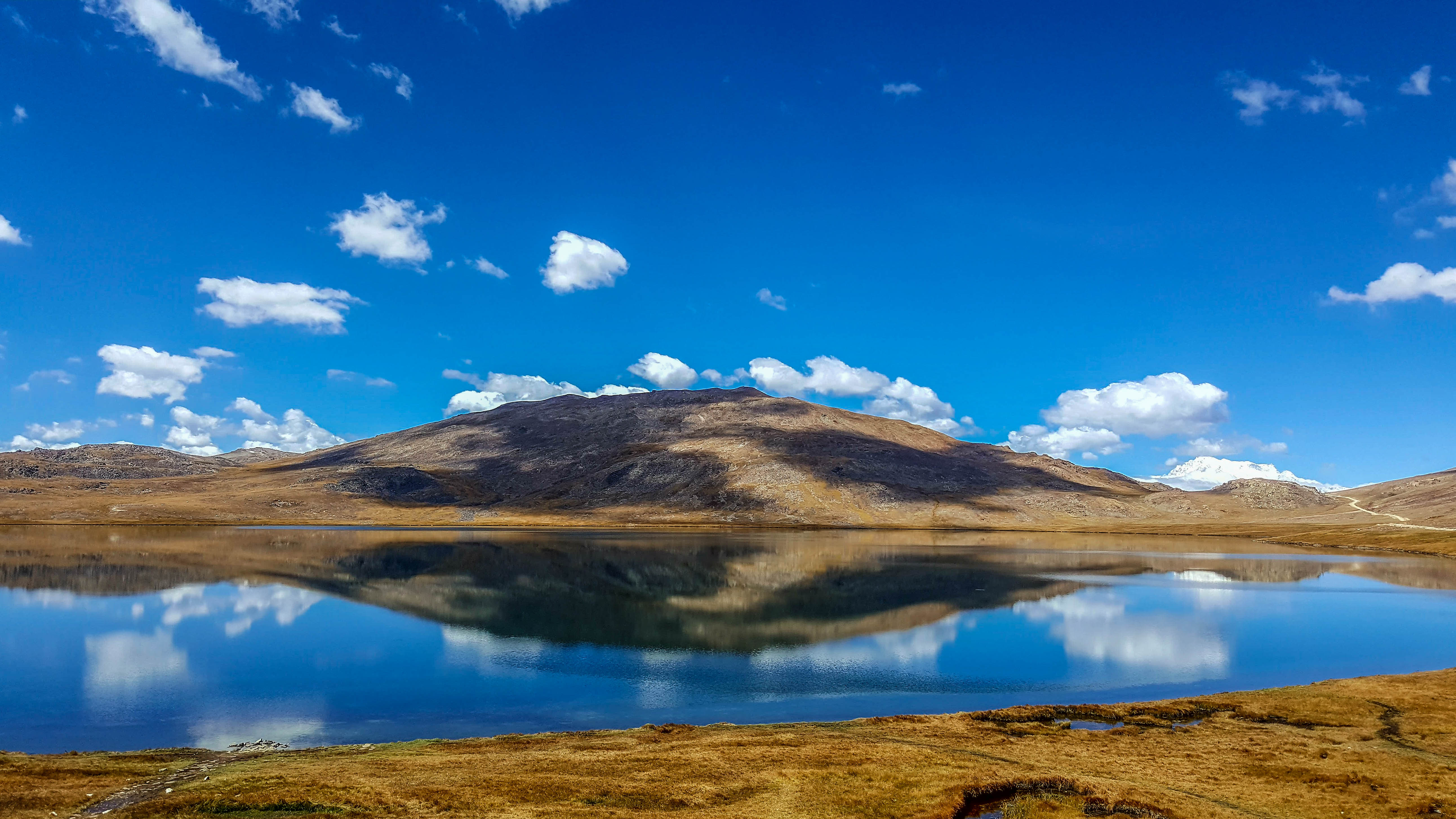

- Location within Gilgit Baltistan Location within Pakistan
- Location: Deosai Plains, Gilgit-Baltistan, Pakistan (Karakoram-West Tibetan Plateau alpine steppe)
- Coordinates: 34°59′29″N 75°14′12″E
- Etymology: Sheosar means 'Blind Lake' in Shina language, as Sheo means 'Blind' while Sar means 'Lake'
- Basin countries: Pakistan
- Max. length: 2.3 kilometres (1.4 mi)
- Max. width: 1.8 kilometres (1.1 mi)
- Average depth: 40 metres (130 ft)
- Surface elevation: 4,250 metres (13,940 ft)
- Settlements: Chilum, Astore

Sheosar Lake (Shina: ݜیوسر) is an alpine lake situated at the western end of Deosai National Park, Gilgit-Baltistan, Pakistan. Located at an elevation of 4,250 metres (13,940 ft), the lake is regarded as one of the highest altitude lakes in the world.

== Access ==
The lake is accessible through two routes. One is via Astore and the other via Skardu. From the main Astore town, it takes about four hours' jeep travel through a semi-metal road to reach Chilum, the last residential area adjacent to the plains. The second route, from Skardu, can be covered by jeep in few hours; however, a trek along this route can take two days. During a clear sunny day, Nanga Parbat peak can be seen from the location of the lake.

== Climate ==
Between the months of November and May the area of Deosai is snow bound. During spring, the surrounding area is covered with a wide variety of flowers and butterflies. Most visitors come to the lake in the summer, between June and early September.

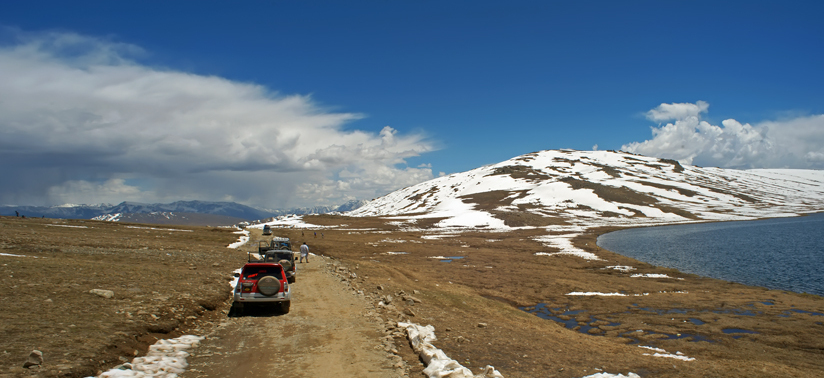
A daytime view of lake

== See also ==
- List of lakes in Pakistan
- List of national parks in Pakistan
