= Choungrah =

Village in Gilgit-Baltistan, Pakistan

Choungrah is a village in Astore District of Gilgit-Baltistan region in northern Pakistan. The village contains three sub-villages: Bari Dar, Majini Dar and Thokay dar and is bounded to the east by Khachik and Harcho, to the north by Astore Bazar, to the west by Eid Ghah and to the south by Nanga Purbat. There are four union councils in Choungrah village, two are in Bari Dar and one each in Majini Dar and Thokay Dar. The Choungrah valley is the route to reach Rama Lake. The people of Choungrah are called Choungroch.
