= Rama Lake =

Rama Lake can be:

- Rama Lake (Pakistan)
- Rama Lake (Bosnia and Herzegovina)
