= Gilgit-Baltistan Independence Day =

Public holiday in Gilgit-Baltistan

Gilgit-Baltistan Independence Day یومِ آزادی گِلگِت بَلتِسْتان
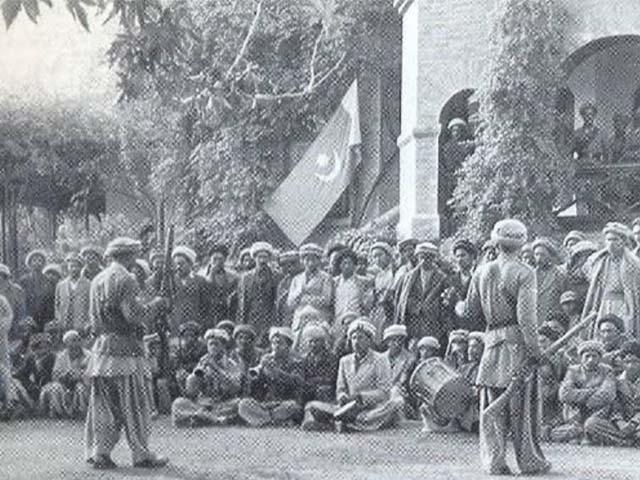
- The Gilgit Scouts raising the Pakistani flag during 1947 Gilgit rebellion, c. 1947
- Observed by: Gilgit-Baltistan
- Significance: Commemorates the independence of Gilgit-Baltistan from the Dogra rule of Jammu and Kashmir, and its accession to Pakistan
- Celebrations: Flag hoisting, parade, award ceremony, singing patriotic songs and the national anthem, speeches by the Governor and Chief Minister, entertainment and cultural programs
- Date: 1 November
- Next time: 1 November 2026
- Frequency: Annual

Gilgit-Baltistan Independence Day (Urdu: یومِ آزادی گِلگِت بَلتِسْتان, romanized: Yaum-i Āzādī Gilgit-Baltistān), observed annually on 1 November, celebrates the independence of Gilgit-Baltistan from the Dogra rule of Jammu and Kashmir, and its accession to Pakistan. It is a public holiday in Gilgit-Baltistan. The flag hoisting ceremony is attended by the Governor, Chief Minister, and Force Commander Northern Areas, along with civil and military officials and war veterans of Gilgit-Baltistan.

Until 2009, Gilgit and Baltistan celebrated independence day on 1 November, the date of Gilgit rebellion, and 14 August, the date of liberation of Skardu, respectively. After the passing of the Self-Governance Order for Gilgit-Baltistan in 2009, 1 November was selected as the official date.

== Background ==
On 1 November 1947, Brigadier Ghansara Singh, the governor appointed in Gilgit by Maharaja Hari Singh of the princely state of Jammu and Kashmir, was arrested by the local force of Gilgit Scouts under Major William Brown and Subedar-Major Babar Khan through a military coup. A provisional government was established under the name of Republic of Gilgit, of which Raja Shah Rais Khan was appointed as the president and Captain Mirza Hassan Khan as the commander-in-chief. The provisional government announced its accession to Pakistan on 16 November. The princely states of Hunza and Nagar signed formal documents of accession with the Governor-General of Pakistan, Muhammad Ali Jinnah on 3 and 18 November, respectively.

In the following months, Colonel Aslam Khan and other military leaders raised a local force known as Ibex Force, consisting of Gilgit Scouts, rebel elements of Jammu and Kashmir State Forces, forces of Hunza and Nagar, and local veterans, and lead them into Baltistan. Skardu was liberated by Chitral Scouts and Chitral Bodyguard under Colonel Mata-ul-Mulk on 14 August 1948.

== Events ==
The main ceremony is held at Chinar Bagh, Gilgit, besides the Yadghar-e-Shuhada (martyrs' memorial).

The 72nd independence day ceremony was attended in 2019 by the then Prime Minister of Pakistan Imran Khan, the first PM to do so. In 2020 during the Gilgit-Baltistan independence day celebration event in Gilgit, Imran Khan announced the provisional province status for Gilgit-Baltistan. The 2025 independence day ceremony was attended by Asif Ali Zardari, the current President of Pakistan.

== See also ==
- Azad Kashmir Day
