= Rama Lake (Pakistan) =

Lake in Gilgit-Baltistan, Pakistan

- راما سر جھیل
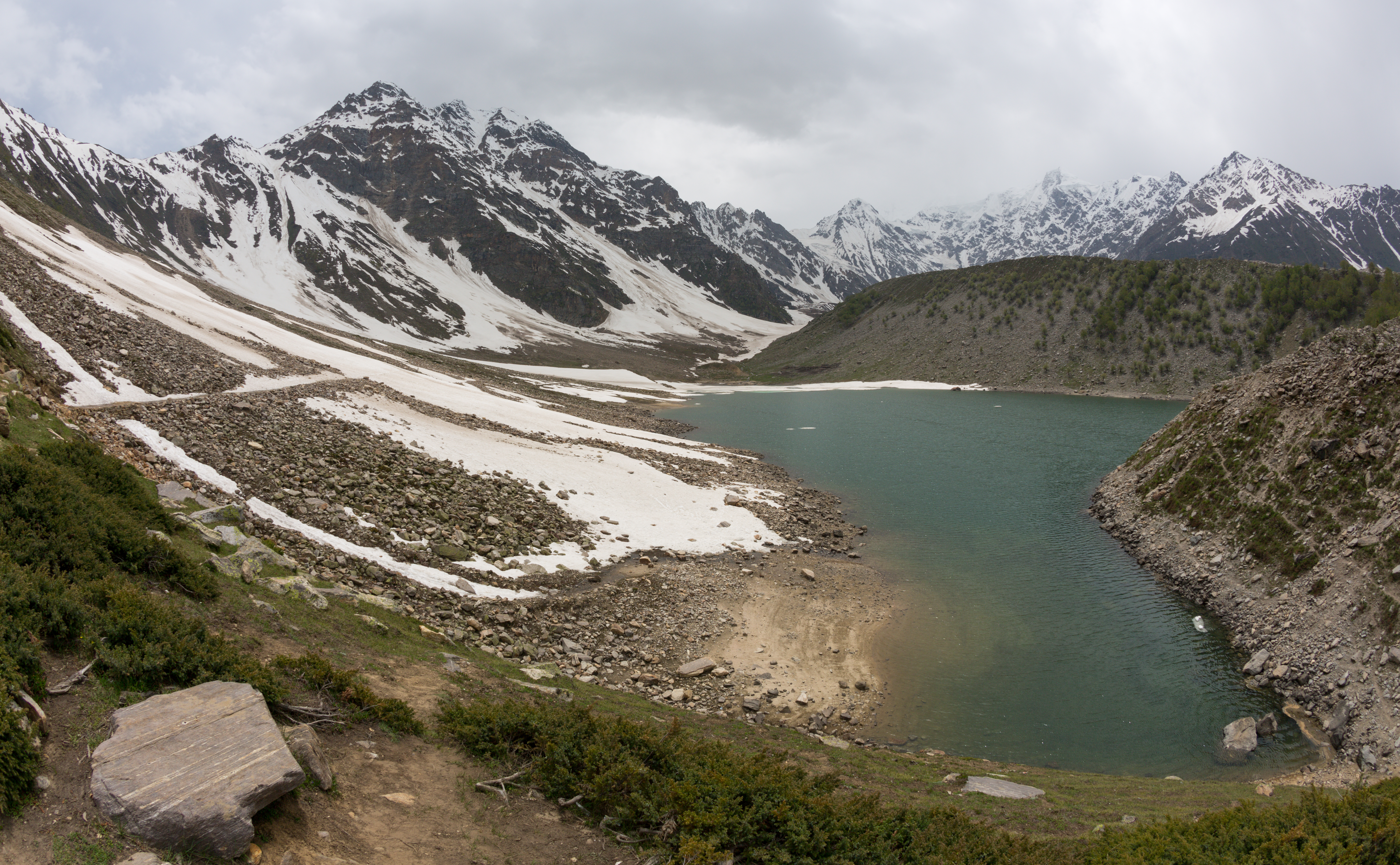
- Rama Lake photographed in 2014

- Location within Gilgit Baltistan Location within Pakistan
- Location: Gilgit-Baltistan, Pakistan
- Coordinates: 35.3303°N 74.7856°E
- Basin countries: Pakistan

Rama Lake (Urdu: راما سر جھیل) is a lake situated near Astore in Gilgit-Baltistan, Pakistan. It is located within the Astore Valley, which is characterized by a light covering of oak trees and other vegetation. As of 2013, the region has experienced significant deforestation, low average rainfall, and reduced vegetation, largely due to widespread illegal logging practices.

== Location ==
On the way to Rama Lake from Astore Valley, there are three small lakes known locally as Sarot in the Shina language.

Before 2005, Astore was a tehsil within the Diamir District, which was the fifth district of Gilgit-Baltistan. It has since been upgraded to a district.

The area surrounding Astore consists of more than 50 small villages, including Chilm, Bubin, Gorikot, Eid Ghah, Fena, Bulen, Choungrah, and Parishing.

== Rama Valley ==
Rama Valley is thickly forested with huge pine, cedar, fir and juniper trees. The valley is about 3,300 meters (10,800 feet) above sea level and is snow covered for 7–8 months of the year. In summer, it turn lush green, benefitting the local shepherds.

The valley serves as the trekking route to the eastern side of Nanga Parbat, the world's 9th highest mountain.

== Demographics ==
Rama Lake is located in Choungrah and the people of Choungrah are called Choungroch.

== See also ==
- Fairy Meadows
- Nanga Parbat
