= Chilum =

Village in Gilgit-Baltistan, Pakistan

Coordinates: 35.0322°N 75.1048°E

Chilum or Chilam is a village of Astore District in Gilgit-Baltistan, Pakistan. It is located near the junction of the Deosai Road and the Astore–Srinagar road. There is checkpost nearby, referred to as Chilam Chowki, at 35°2'8"N 75°6'10" E and elevation 3869 m (12696 ft).
