= Gilgit-Baltistan =

Region administered by Pakistan

Gilgit-Baltistan گلگت بلتستان
- Region administered by Pakistan as an administrative territory
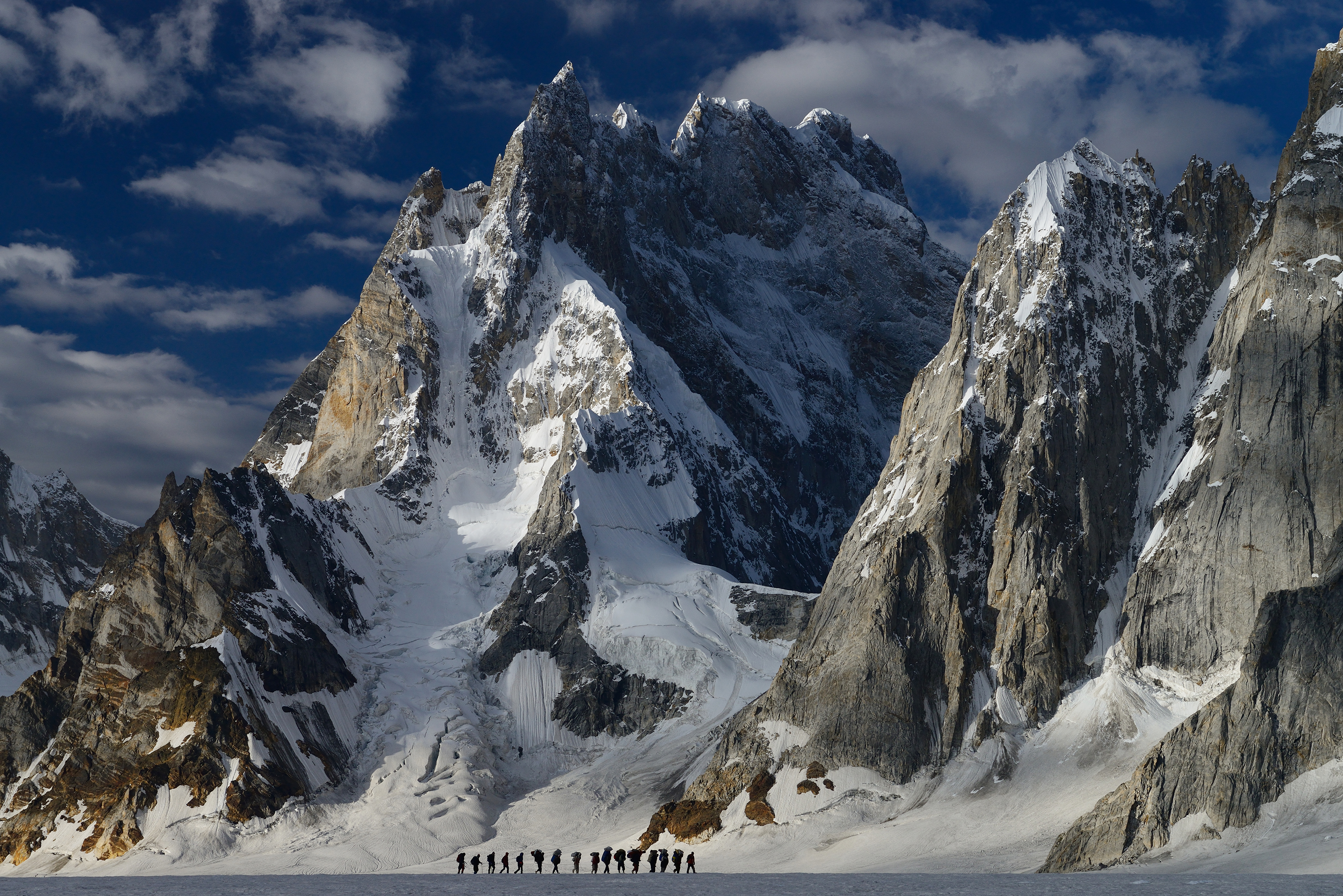
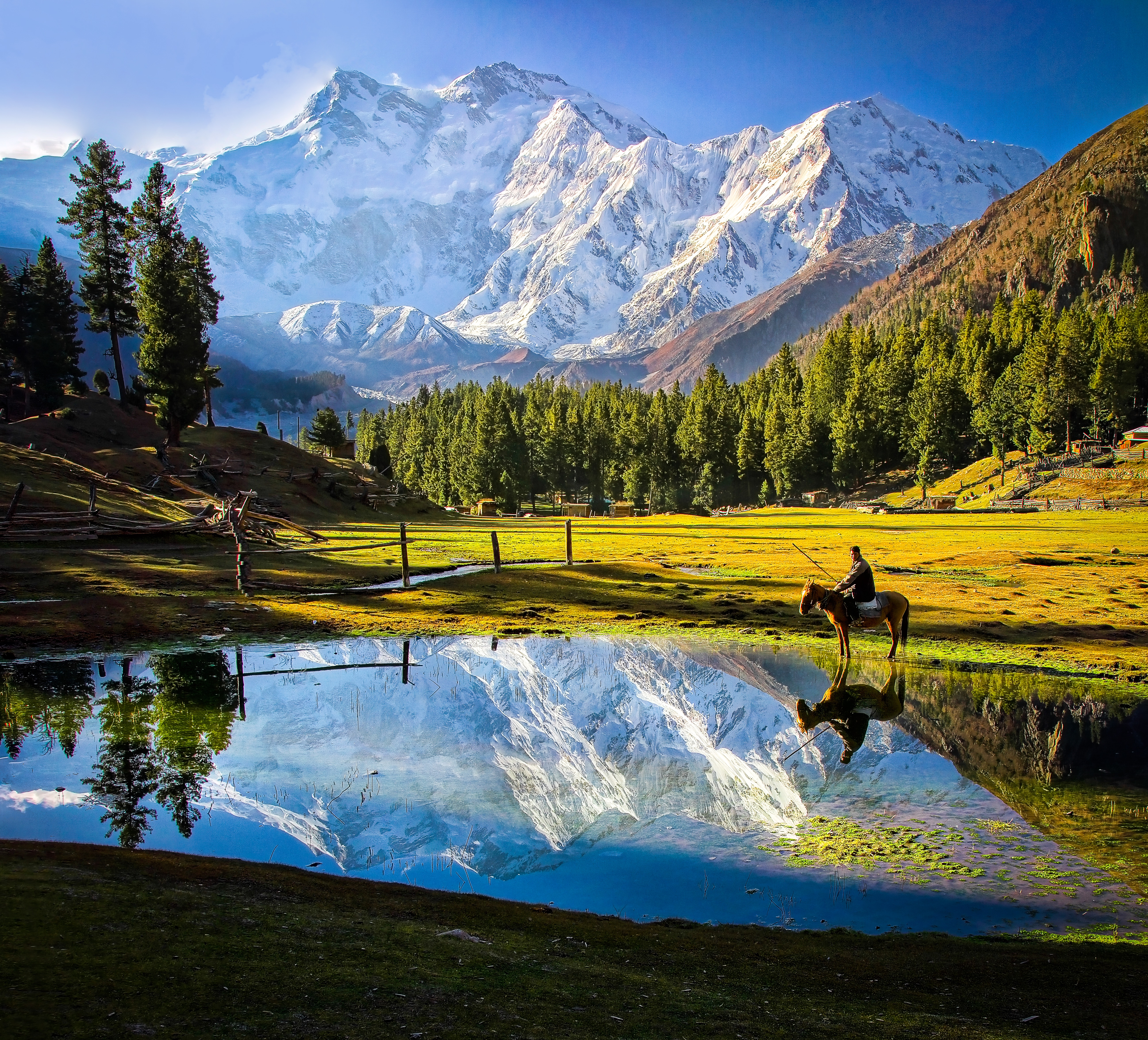
- Top: Biafo Glacier; Bottom: Nanga Parbat Mountain

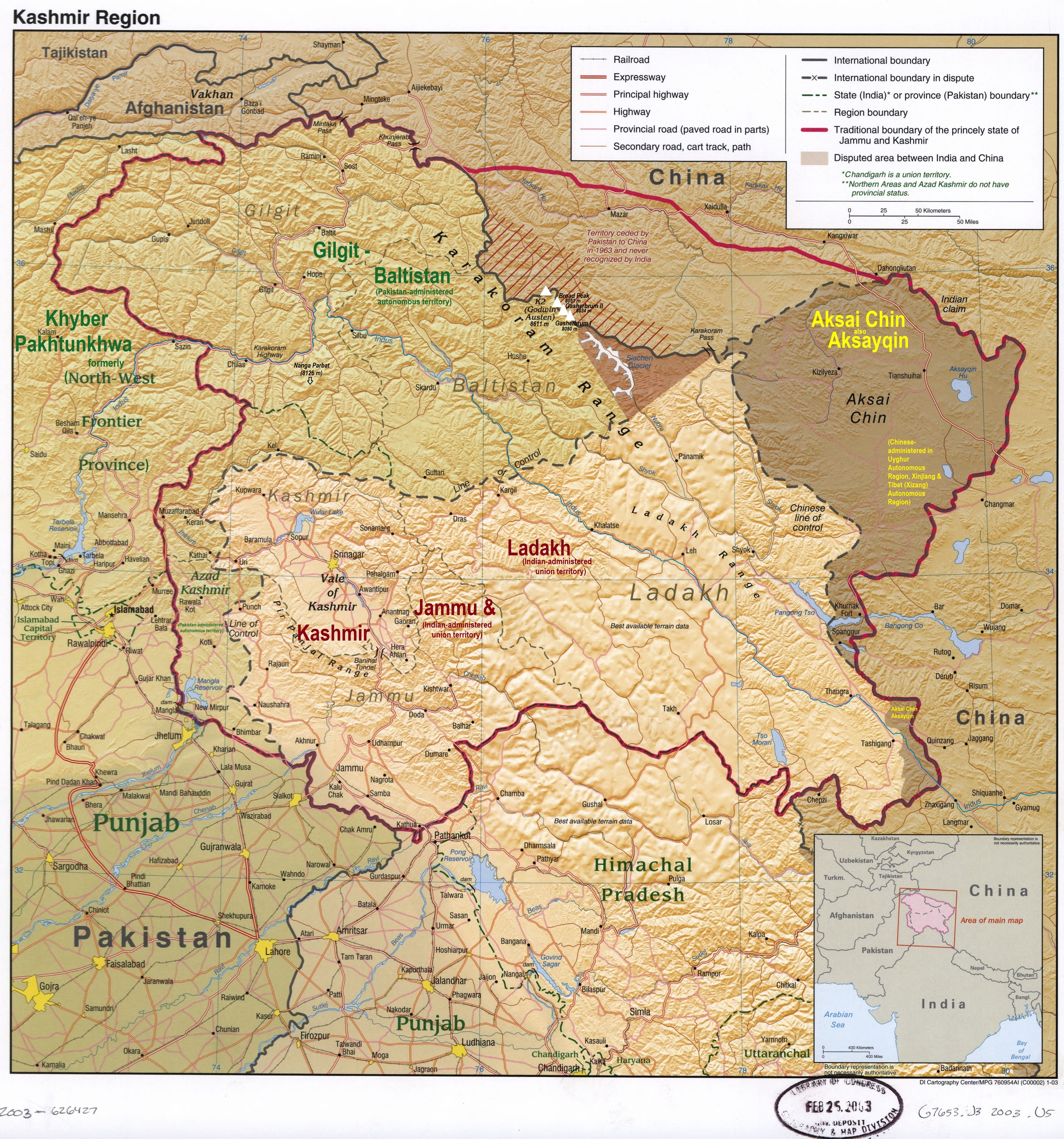
- A map of the disputed Kashmir region with the two Pakistan-administered areas shaded in sage-green.
- Interactive map of Gilgit-Baltistan
- Coordinates: 35.35°N 75.9°E
- Administering country: Pakistan
- Gilgit Rebellion: 1 November 1947 (Gilgit-Baltistan Independence Day)
- Formation of Northern Areas: August 1972
- De facto provincial status: 29 August 2009
- Capital: Gilgit

Government
  - Type: Nominally self-governing parliamentary territory within a federal parliamentary republic
  - Body: Government of Gilgit-Baltistan
  - Governor: Syed Mehdi Shah
  - Chief Minister: Amjad Hussain Azar
  - Chief Secretary: Ahmed Ali Mirza (BPS 21-PAS)
  - Legislature: Gilgit-Baltistan Assembly
  - High Court: Gilgit-Baltistan Chief Court

Area
  - Total: 72,496 km^{2} (27,991 sq mi)

Population (2023)
  - Total: 1,709,049
  - Density: 23.574/km^{2} (61.057/sq mi)

Languages
  - Official: Urdu; English
  - Regional: Balti; Shina; Wakhi; Burushaski; Khowar; Domaki; Purgi
- Time zone: UTC+05:00 (PKT)
- ISO 3166 code: PK-GB
- HDI (2019): 0.592 ▲ Medium
- Assembly seats: 33
- Divisions: 3
- Districts: 10
- Tehsils: 34
- Website: gilgitbaltistan.gov.pk

Gilgit-Baltistan (/ˌɡɪlɡɪt ˌbɔːltɪˈstɑːn, -stæn/; Urdu: گِلْگِت بَلْتِسْتان [ɡɪlɡɪt̪ bəlt̪ɪst̪aːn]), (Note: Shina: گِلگِت بَلتِستٓن, Balti: གིལ་གིཏ་སྦལ་ཏི་སྟན། / گلگت بلتستان, Wylie: Gil git sbal ti stan, Burushaski: گلگت بلتستان, Wakhi: Гилгит Балтистан / گلگت بلتستان) formerly known as the Northern Areas, is a region administered by Pakistan as an administrative territory and consists of the northern portion of the larger Kashmir region, which has been the subject of a dispute between India and Pakistan since 1947 and between India and China since 1959. It borders Azad Kashmir to the south, the province of Khyber Pakhtunkhwa to the west, the Wakhan District of Afghanistan to the north, the Xinjiang region of China to the east and northeast, and the Indian-administered union territories of Jammu and Kashmir and Ladakh to the southeast.

The territory encompassing present-day Gilgit-Baltistan became a single administrative unit as Federally Administered Northern Areas in 1972. In 2009, the region was renamed as Gilgit-Baltistan and provincial institutions were created; the current administrative set-up is as per the Gilgit-Baltistan Order of 2018. Much of the population of Gilgit-Baltistan reportedly wants the territory to become integrated with Pakistan proper as a fifth province, and opposes integration with the rest of the Kashmir region. The Pakistani government has rejected calls from the territory for provincial status on the grounds that granting such a request would jeopardise Pakistan's demands for the entire Kashmir conflict to be resolved according to all related United Nations resolutions.

Gilgit-Baltistan covers an area of 72,496 km^{2} (27,911 sq mi) and has a population of 1.7 million people according to the 2023 national census, which is linguistically and ethnically diverse. Gilgit is its capital as well as the most populous city, followed by Skardu and Chilas. Over two-thirds of Gilgit-Baltistan consist of glaciers, mountains and lakes; the region is home to five of the 14 eight-thousanders, including K2, and has more than fifty mountain peaks above 7,000 metres (23,000 ft). The economy is dominated by agriculture and the tourism industry. The main tourism activities are trekking and mountaineering, and this industry has been growing in importance throughout the region.

== Name ==
Gilgit-Baltistan is named after the two former agencies, Gilgit and Baltistan, which were merged in 1972 to form Northern Areas. The closest to a historical name for the entire region is Boloristan or Bolor, documented in the medieval Islamic and Chinese sources, in which Gilgit Valley is generally described as Little Bolor and Baltistan as Great Bolor; the name likely derives from the early medieval Patola dynasty. Other names dating from medieval period include Burushal for Gilgit Valley, Little Tibet for Baltistan, and Shinaki for Shina-speaking areas, with none being comprehensive for all areas.

Before the renaming of Northern Areas, a variety of names were suggested. In December 2008, a name-finding commission appointed by Northern Areas Legislative Assembly found a consensus in the name of Gilgit-Baltistan, which was followed by the federal government.

The region, together with Azad Kashmir in the southwest, is grouped and referred to by the United Nations and other international organisations as "Pakistan-administered Kashmir". (Note: The Indian government and Indian sources refer to Azad Kashmir and Gilgit-Baltistan as "Pakistan-occupied Kashmir" ("PoK") or "Pakistan-held Kashmir" ("PhK"). Sometimes Azad Kashmir alone is meant by these terms. "Pakistan-administered Kashmir" and "Pakistan-controlled Kashmir" are used by neutral sources. Conversely, Pakistani sources refer to the territories under Indian control as "Indian-occupied Kashmir" ("IoK") or "Indian-held Kashmir" ("IhK").) Gilgit-Baltistan is six times larger than Azad Kashmir in terms of geographical area.

== History ==
=== Early history ===
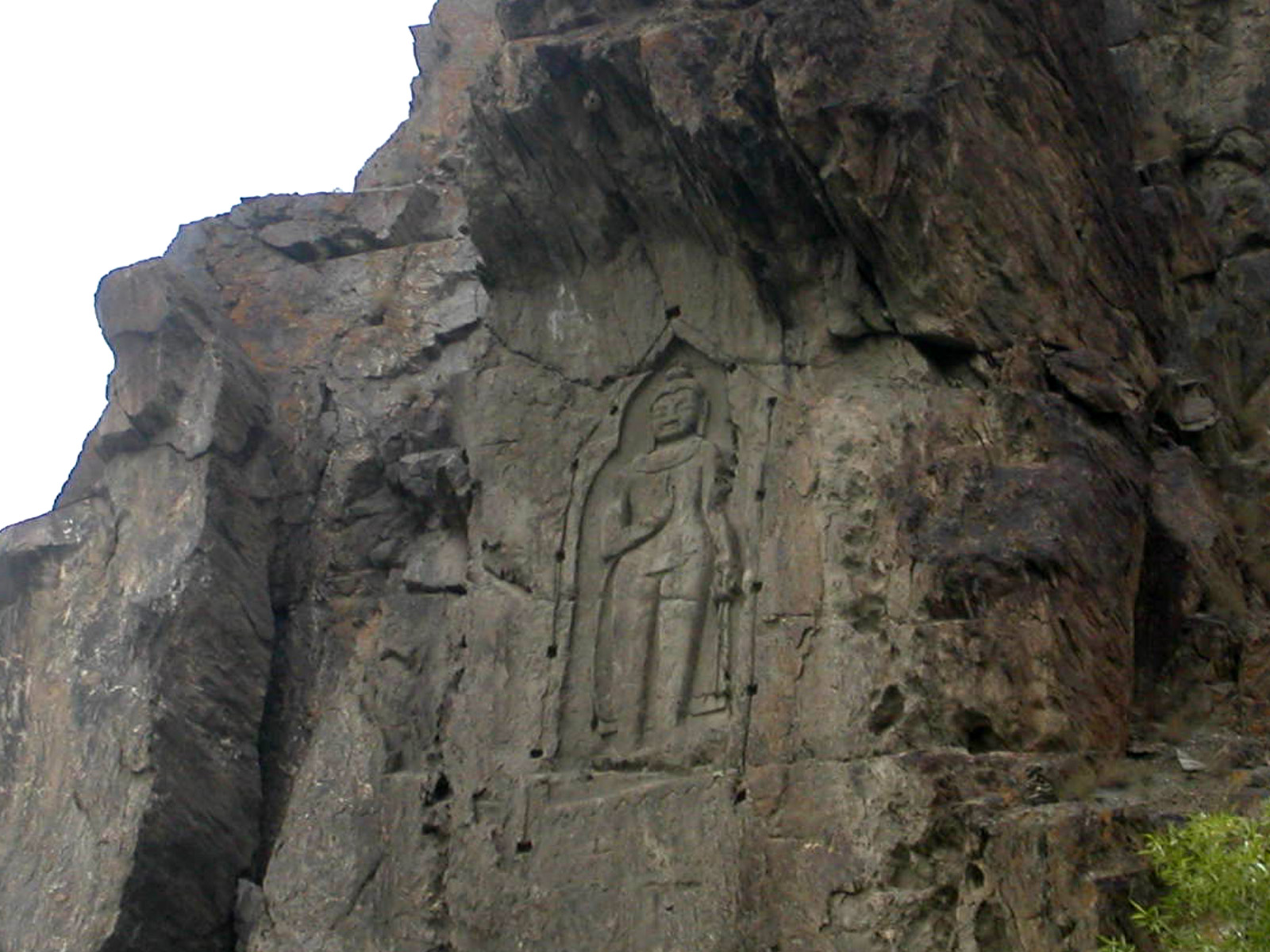
Kargah Buddha in Gilgit; "The ancient Stupa – rock carvings of Buddha, everywhere in the region, point to the firm hold of Buddhism for such a long time."

The rock carvings found in various places in Gilgit-Baltistan, especially in the Passu village of Hunza, suggest a human presence since 2000 BC. Within the next few centuries of human settlement on the Tibetan Plateau, this region became inhabited by Tibetic people, who preceded the Balti people of Baltistan. Today Baltistan bears similarity to Ladakh ethnically and culturally (although not in religion). Indo-Aryan peoples (sometimes described as Dards) settled mainly in the western areas. These people are the Shina-speaking peoples of Gilgit, Chilas, Astore and Diamir, while in Hunza and the northern regions, Burushaski (a language isolate) and Khowar (another Indo-Aryan language) speakers predominate. The Dards find mention in the works of Herodotus, (Note: He twice mentions a people called Dadikai, first along with the Gandarioi, and again in the catalogue of king Xerxes's army invading Greece. Herodotus also mentions the gold-digging ants of Central Asia.) Nearchus, Megasthenes, Pliny, (Note: In the 1st century, Pliny repeats that the Dards were great producers of gold.) Ptolemy, (Note: Ptolemy situates the Daradrai on the upper reaches of the Indus) and the geographical lists of the Puranas. In the 1st century, the people of these regions were followers of the Bon religion while in the 2nd century, they practised Buddhism.

Between 399 and 414, the Chinese Buddhist pilgrim Faxian visited Gilgit-Baltistan. In the 6th century Somana Palola (greater Gilgit-Chilas) was ruled by an unknown king. Between 627 and 645, the Chinese Buddhist pilgrim Xuanzang travelled through this region on his pilgrimage to India.

According to Chinese records from the Tang dynasty, between the 600s and the 700s, the region was governed by a Buddhist dynasty referred to as Bolü (Chinese: 勃律; pinyin: bólǜ), also transliterated as Palola, Patola, Balur. believed to have been the Patola Shahi dynasty mentioned in a Brahmi inscription, who were devout adherents of Vajrayana Buddhism. At the time, Little Palola (Chinese: 小勃律) was used to refer to Gilgit, while Great Palola (Chinese: 大勃律) was used to refer to Baltistan. However, the records do not consistently disambiguate the two.

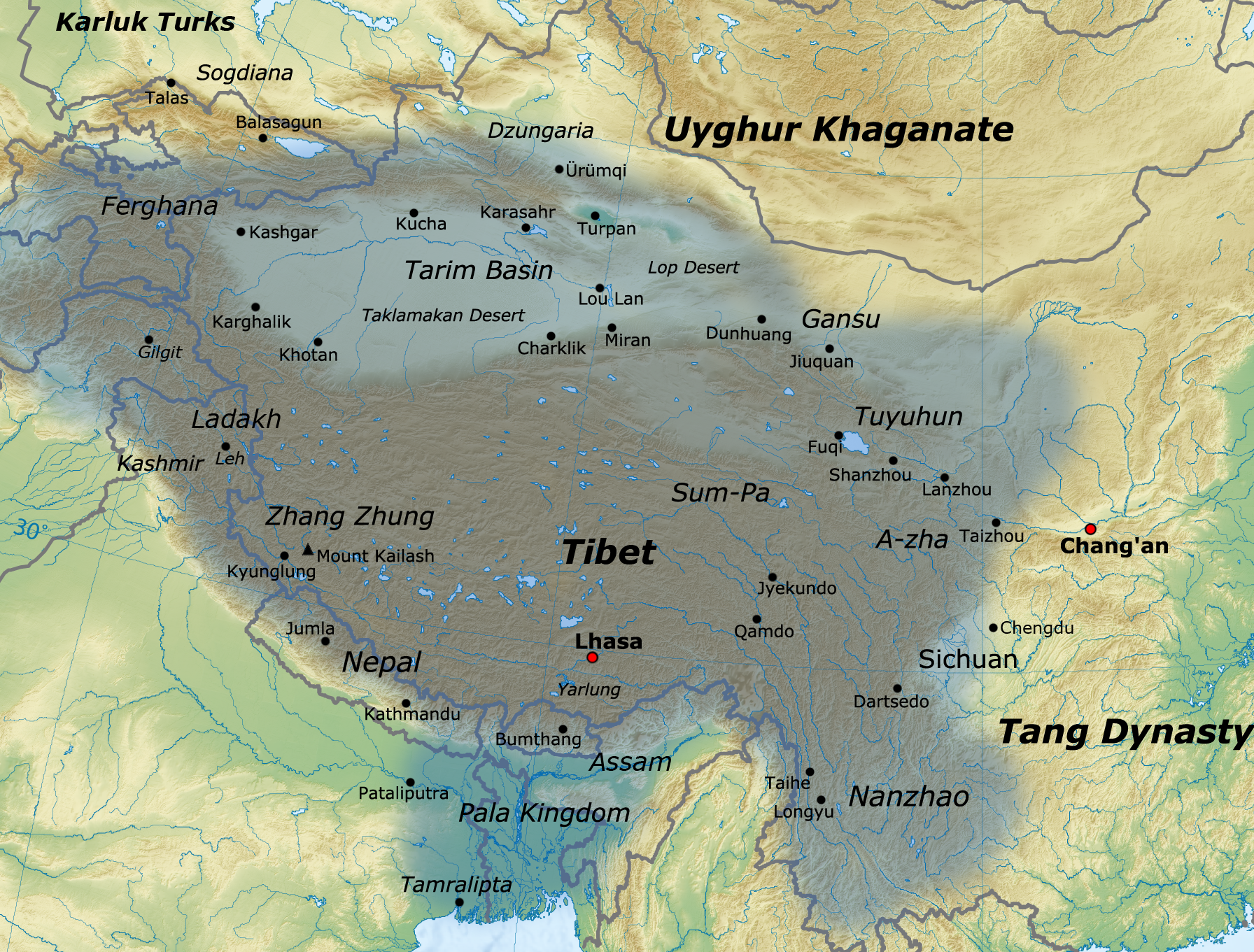
Tibetan Empire at its peak in 780–790 CE

In mid-600s, Gilgit came under Chinese suzerainty after the fall of the Western Turkic Khaganate to Tang military campaigns in the region. In the late 600s CE, the rising Tibetan Empire wrestled control of the region from the Chinese. However, faced with growing influence of the Umayyad Caliphate and then the Abbasid Caliphate to the west, the Tibetans were forced to ally themselves with the Islamic caliphates. The region was then contested by Chinese and Tibetan forces, and their respective vassal states, until the mid-700s. Rulers of Gilgit formed an alliance with the Tang Chinese, and held back the Arabs with their help.

Between 644 and 655, Navasurendrāditya-nandin became king of the Palola Sāhi dynasty in Gilgit. Numerous Sanskrit inscriptions, including the Danyor Rock Inscriptions, are discovered to be from his reign. In the late 600s and early 700s, Jayamaṅgalavikramāditya-nandin was king of Gilgit.

According to Chinese court records, in 717 and 719 respectively, delegations of a ruler of Great Palola (Baltistan) named Su-fu-she-li-ji-li-ni (Chinese: 蘇弗舍利支離泥; pinyin: sūfúshèlìzhīlíní) reached the Chinese imperial court. By at least 719/720, Ladakh (Mard) became part of the Tibetan Empire. By that time, Buddhism was practised in Baltistan, and Sanskrit was the written language.

In 720, the delegation of Surendrāditya (Chinese: 蘇麟陀逸之; pinyin: sūlíntuóyìzhī) reached the Chinese imperial court. He was referred to in Chinese records as the king of Great Palola; however, it is unknown if Baltistan was under Gilgit rule at the time. By 721/722, Baltistan had come under the influence of the Tibetan Empire.

In 721–722, the Tibetan army attempted but failed to capture Gilgit or Bruzha (Yasin Valley). By this time, according to Chinese records, the king of Little Palola was Mo-ching-mang (Chinese: 沒謹忙; pinyin: méijǐnmáng). He had visited the Tang court requesting military assistance against the Tibetans. Between 723 and 728, the Korean Buddhist pilgrim Hyecho passed through this area. In 737/738, Tibetan troops under the leadership of Minister Bel Kyesang Dongtsab of Emperor Me Agtsom took control of Little Palola. By 747, the Chinese army under the leadership of the ethnic-Korean commander Gao Xianzhi had recaptured Little Palola. Great Palola was subsequently captured by the Chinese army in 753 under military Governor Feng Changqing. However, by 755, due to the An Lushan rebellion, the Tang Chinese forces withdrew and were no longer able to exert influence in Central Asia or in the regions around Gilgit-Baltistan. The control of the region was left to the Tibetan Empire. They referred to the region as Bruzha, a toponym that is consistent with the ethnonym "Burusho" used today. Tibetan control of the region lasted until late-800s CE.

=== Medieval history ===
After the decline of Tibetan Empire, the region disintegrated into a number of small principalities, each controlling little more than a single river valley. In the 14th century Sufi Muslim preachers from Persia and Central Asia introduced Islam in Baltistan, notably Muhammad Nurbakhsh and Shamsuddin Araqi, while in the Gilgit Valley Islam entered in the same century through the Trakhān dynasty. Believed to have come to power in the 8th century CE, it is named after Raja Torrā Khan I (1241–75). The branches of Trakhān dynasty ruled the neighbouring Hunza Valley as well. A Hunza prince fled to Shigar by crossing Hispar Pass in the 10th century and founded Amacha dynasty. The westernmost valleys of Yasin, Ishkoman and Ghizer came under control of Khushwaqt dynasty, a branch of Kator dynasty of Chitral, after the 16th century.

In Skardu, Maqpon dynasty was founded towards the end of the 15th century. In a series of conquests, Maqpon king Ali Senge Anchan (1595–1633) brought vast territories from Purang in east to Brushal in the west under his rule. He established marital alliances with Gyalpo of Ladakh, and had friendly relations with the Mughal court. The famous 17th-century queen of Gilgit, Dadi Jawari was his daughter-in-law. Anchan's reign brought prosperity and entertained art, sport, and variety in architecture. He introduced polo to the region, and sent a group of musicians from Skardu to Delhi to learn Indian music; Mughal architecture influenced the architecture of the region as well under his reign. Various families descending from Anchan continued to rule Skardu, Kharmang, Roundu and Astore until the Dogra conquest in the 19th century, even as Shigar (under Amacha dynasty) and Khaplu (under Yabghu dynasty) remained separate kingdoms, and Diamer remained divided among tribal republics.

=== Under Princely state of Jammu and Kashmir ===
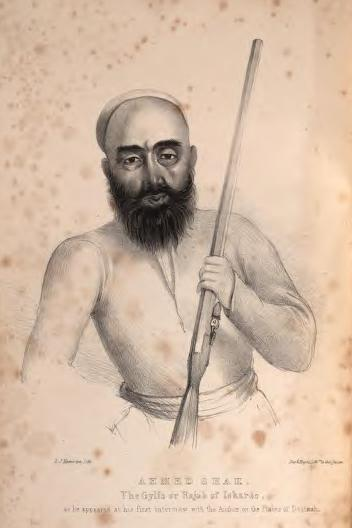
The last Maqpon Raja Ahmed Shah (died in prison in Lhasa c. 1845)

During the early decades of the 19th century, two rulers rose to much importance. The Maqpon king Ahmad Shah of Skardu unified much of Baltistan through conquests and alliances between 1820 and 1840, while in west Gohar Aman of Khushwaqt dynasty conquered Gilgit in 1842. The resentment and help of rajas deposed by them aided Dogra dynasty in conquering much of Gilgit-Baltistan in the succeeding decades.

In November 1839, the Dogra commander Zorawar Singh, whose allegiance was to Gulab Singh, invaded Baltistan. By 1840 he had conquered Skardu and captured Ahmad Shah. Ahmad Shah was then forced to accompany Zorawar Singh on his raid into western Tibet. Meanwhile, Baghwan Singh was appointed as administrator (thanadar) in Skardu. But in the following year, Ali Khan of Rondu, Haidar Khan of Shigar and Daulat Ali Khan from Khaplu led a successful uprising against the Dogras in Baltistan and captured the Dogra commander Baghwan Singh in Skardu.

In 1842, Dogra Commander Wasir Lakhpat, with the active support of Ali Sher Khan (III) from Kartaksho, conquered Baltistan for the second time. There was a violent capture of the fortress of Kharphocho. Haidar Khan from Shigar, one of the leaders of the uprising against the Dogras, was imprisoned and died in captivity. Gosaun was appointed as administrator (Thanadar) of Baltistan.

In 1842, Karim Khan, the brother of Raja of Gilgit deposed by Gohar Aman, sought the help of Ghulam Muhyuddin, governor of Kashmir on the behalf of Sikh Empire. Muhyuddin dispatched a Sikh contingent under colonel Nathu Shah who instated him to the throne, while annexing Astore and Gilgit into the Sikh kingdom. After a few years Nathu Shah was killed in a battle against the Mir of Hunza and Gilgit was once again conquered by Gohar Aman. It was not until his death in 1860 that Dogras finally managed to subdue Gilgit.

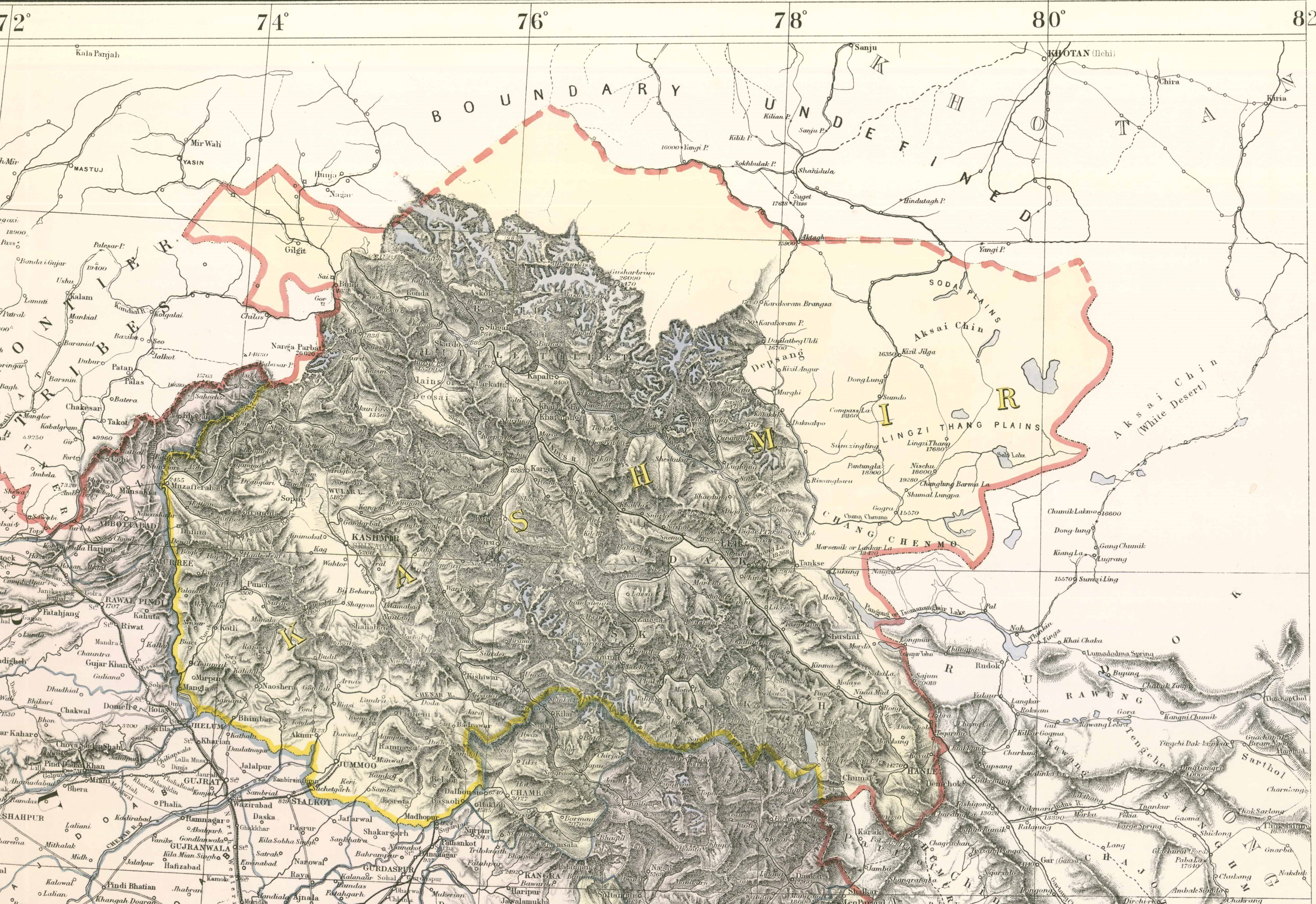
The princely state of Jammu and Kashmir in 1888, the year Gilgit Agency was established.

After the defeat of the Sikhs in the First Anglo-Sikh War, the Lahore court had to cede Kashmir Valley and the neighbouring Himalayan areas to the British in the treaty of Lahore, who in turn sold these areas to Gulab Singh for 7.5 million Nanakshahi rupees after the signing of Treaty of Amritsar, and also confirmed him on his conquests in Baltistan and Ladakh. In this way Baltistan, Astore and Gilgit tehsil became a part of the newly established princely state of Jammu and Kashmir in 1846.

==== Gilgit Agency ====
After the establishment of the princely state Baltistan was set up as a tehsil of Ladakh Wazarat while Gilgit and Astore were reorganised into separate Gilgit Wazarat. However, in 1888–89 Gilgit Agency, a British Political Agency, was formed by British government at Gilgit to keep a check on Russian activities in Central Asia. For a time Gilgit was run through this dual system of governance, although it was the British Political Agent, and not the Dogra Wazir-i-Wazarat (governor), who held primacy. The British continued the expansion of the agency: in 1891 the states of Hunza and Nagar were formally brought under British suzerainty following the Anglo-Burusho War; after the British success in the 1895 Chitral Expedition, Chitral was separated from Gilgit Agency and added to the newly created Malakand Agency while the Khushwaqt territories of Ishkoman, Ghizer, and Yasin remained within the Gilgit Agency. Finally in 1934 the control of Indus Kohistan was transferred from Gilgit to NWFP. In 1935, the Gilgit tehsil was formally leased by British government to simplify governance.

The population in Gilgit perceived itself as ethnically different from Kashmiris and disliked being ruled by the Kashmir state. The legal status of Gilgit Agency was also contentious among British and state officials; in 1941, the British government settled that except for leased area, other territories including Hunza and Nagar states did not form part of Kashmir (see Gilgit Agency § Political status).

The region remained with the princely state, with temporary leases of some areas assigned to the British, until 1 November 1947.

=== First Kashmir War ===
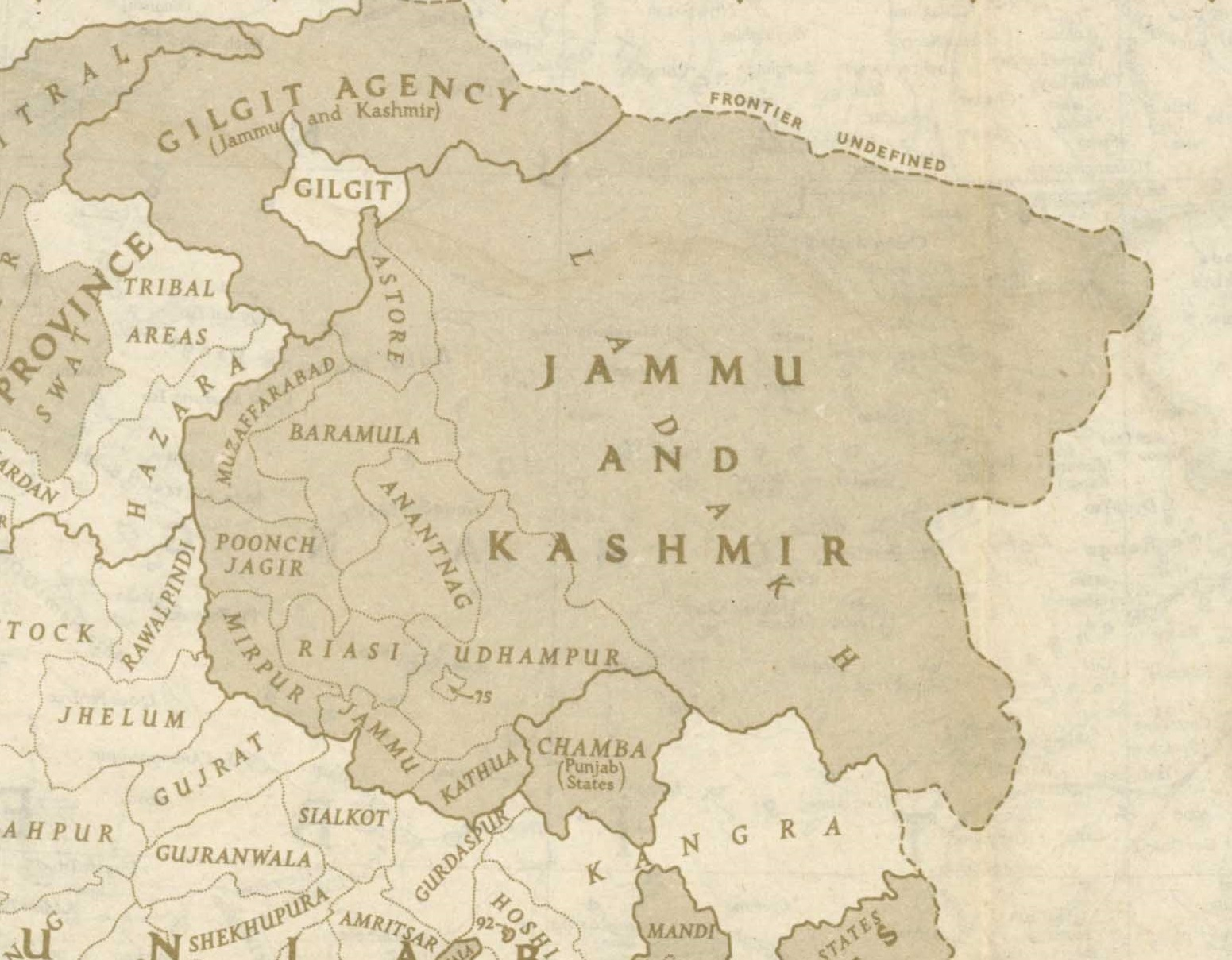
The princely state of Jammu and Kashmir, (National Geographic, 1946). Shown are the Gilgit Agency, consisting of areas under the suzerainty of Maharaja of Jammu and Kashmir, and the Gilgit Wazarat, including the Gilgit Leased Area (shown in white). Baltistan was part of the Ladakh Wazarat in the east.

After Pakistan's independence, Jammu and Kashmir initially remained an independent state. Later on 22 October 1947, tribal militias backed by Pakistan crossed the border into Jammu and Kashmir after Poonch rebellion and Jammu Muslim massacre. Hari Singh made a plea to India for assistance and signed the Instrument of Accession, making his state a part of India. India air-lifted troops to defend the Kashmir Valley and the invaders were pushed back behind Uri.

Gilgit's population did not favour the State's accession to India. The Muslims of the frontier ilaqas (Gilgit and the adjoining hill states) had wanted to join Pakistan. Sensing their discontent, Major William Brown, the Maharaja's commander of the Gilgit Scouts, mutinied on 1 November 1947, directing his Subedar-Major Babar Khan to arrest the governor Ghansara Singh. The bloodless coup d'état was planned by Brown to the last detail under the code name "Datta Khel", which was also joined by a rebellious section of the Jammu and Kashmir State Forces under Mirza Hassan Khan. Brown ensured that the treasury was secured and minorities were protected. A provisional government (Aburi Hakoomat) was established by the Gilgit locals with Raja Shah Rais Khan as the president and Mirza Hassan Khan as the commander-in-chief. However, Major Brown had already telegraphed Khan Abdul Qayyum Khan asking Pakistan to take over. Pakistan's political agent, Khan Mohammad Alam Khan, arrived on 16 November and took over the administration of Gilgit. Brown outmaneuvered the pro-Independence group and secured the approval of the mirs and rajas for accession to Pakistan. Hunza acceded to Pakistan on 3 November, followed by Nagar on 18 November. 1 November is designated as the liberation day by the Government of Gilgit-Baltistan.

The provisional government lasted 16 days. According to scholar Yaqub Khan Bangash, it lacked sway over the population. The Gilgit rebellion did not have civilian involvement and was solely the work of military leaders, not all of whom had been in favour of joining Pakistan, at least in the short term. Historian Ahmed Hasan Dani says that although there had been a lack of public participation in the rebellion, pro-Pakistan sentiments were intense in the civilian population and their anti-Kashmiri sentiments were also clear. According to various scholars, the people of Gilgit as well as those of Chilas, Koh-i-Ghizr, Ishkoman, Yasin, Punial, Hunza and Nagar joined Pakistan by choice.

After taking control of Gilgit, the Gilgit Scouts joined by Chitral Scouts moved towards Baltistan and Ladakh and captured Skardu by August 1948. They successfully blocked Indian reinforcements sent to relieve Skardu, and proceeded towards Kargil and Leh. Indian forces mounted an offensive in the autumn of 1948 to push them back from Ladakh, but Baltistan came into the rebels' territory.

On 1 January 1948, India took the issue of Jammu and Kashmir to the United Nations Security Council. In April 1948, the Council passed a resolution calling for Pakistan to withdraw from all of Jammu and Kashmir and for India to reduce its forces to the minimum level, following which a plebiscite would be held to ascertain the people's wishes. However, no withdrawal was ever carried out. India insisted that Pakistan had to withdraw first and Pakistan contended there was no guarantee that India would withdraw afterwards. Gilgit-Baltistan, along with the western districts that came to be called Azad Kashmir, have remained under the control of Pakistan ever since.

=== Inside Pakistan ===
While the residents of Gilgit-Baltistan expressed a desire to join Pakistan after gaining independence from Maharaja Hari Singh, Pakistan declined to merge the region into itself because of the territory's link to Jammu and Kashmir. For a short period after joining Pakistan, Gilgit-Baltistan was governed by Azad Kashmir if only "theoretically, but not practically" through its claim of being an alternative government for Jammu and Kashmir. In 1949, the Government of Azad Kashmir formally handed over the administration of Gilgit-Baltistan to the federal government under the Karachi Agreement. From then until 1972, Gilgit-Baltistan was governed through the colonial-era Frontier Crimes Regulations, which were originally created for the northwest tribal regions. There was no democratic set-up during this period. All political and judicial powers remained in the hands of the Ministry of Kashmir Affairs and Northern Areas (KANA).

In 1960, elections were held for first time under Basic democracy system under President Ayub Khan. In 1963, Pakistan signed the Sino-Pakistani Frontier Agreement, which settled its borders with China. The resulting Sino-Pak border, which essentially followed Macartney–MacDonald Line as modified by Lord Curzon in 1905, saw territorial exchanges, in which Pakistan gained territory in Shimshal Valley in return of ceding its claims over Shaksgam Valley. In 1969, a Northern Areas Advisory Council (NAAC) was created, later renamed to Northern Areas Council (NAC) in 1974 and Northern Areas Legislative Council (NALC) in 1994. But it was devoid of legislative powers. All law-making was concentrated in the KANA Ministry of Pakistan. In August 1972 FCR was abolished by Prime Minister Zulfiqar Ali Bhutto and the two parts of the territory, viz., the Gilgit Agency and Baltistan Agency, along with Nagar state, were merged into a single administrative unit, and given the name "Northern Areas", and three districts, Gilgit, Diamer and Baltistan, were formed. In a visit to Northern Areas in September 1974, Bhutto announced the abolition of Hunza state. In 1974 Ghizer District was carved out of Gilgit and Ghanche District out of Baltistan (renamed Skardu), but both were abolished sometimes later. They were re-established only in 1989.

In 1984 the territory's importance shot up within Pakistan with the opening of the Karakoram Highway and the region's population became more connected to mainland Pakistan. The improved connectivity facilitated the local population to avail itself of educational opportunities in the rest of Pakistan. It also allowed the political parties of Pakistan and Azad Kashmir to set up local branches, raise political awareness in the region. According to Ershad Mahmud, these Pakistani political parties have played a 'laudable role' in organising a movement for democratic rights among the residents of Gilgit-Baltistan.

In 2004, a sixth district, Astore, was created from Diamer, followed by Hunza-Nagar District from Gilgit in 2008. On 29 August 2009, the Gilgit-Baltistan Empowerment and Self-Governance Order 2009 was passed by the Pakistani cabinet and later signed by the then President of Pakistan Asif Ali Zardari. The order granted self-rule to the people of Gilgit-Baltistan, by creating, among other institutions, an elected Gilgit-Baltistan Legislative Assembly and Gilgit-Baltistan Council. Gilgit-Baltistan thus gained a de facto province-like status without constitutionally becoming part of Pakistan. In 2015, Hunza-Nagar was bifurcated into Hunza and Nagar districts while Kharmang and Shigar districts were separated from Skardu District. In July 2018, the 2009 ordinance was replaced with Gilgit-Baltistan Order 2018, which relegated the powers previously vested to Gilgit-Baltistan Council to the Gilgit-Baltistan Assembly, including the legislation regarding the sectors of tourism, minerals and hydropower. It also abolished the role of KANA. The order however vests substantial executive power to the office of Prime Minister. In 2020 Imran Khan Government announced that it would be granted provisional provincial status, and the Pakistani political parties agreed to pass constitutional amendment to propose Gilgit-Baltistan as a province.

Some Kashmiri nationalist groups, such as the Jammu and Kashmir Liberation Front, claim Gilgit-Baltistan as part of a future independent state to match what they envision to have existed in 1947. India, on the other hand, claims that Gilgit-Baltistan as a part of the former princely state of Jammu and Kashmir is "an integral part of the country [India]."

== Geography ==
Gilgit-Baltistan is home to some of the highest mountain ranges in the world: the Karakoram, the Hindu Kush and the western Himalayas. The highly glaciated Karakoram range runs parallel to the northeast of the Himalayas for over 700 kilometres. It meets the Pamir Mountains and the Hindu Kush at Khora Bhurt Pass in Ishkoman. Karakoram contains several of the highest peaks in the world, including K2, Gasherbrum I, Gasherbrum II and Broad Peak, all rising over 8,000 m, while its massifs host vast glaciers such as the Biafo, the Baltoro, and the Batura.

Topographic map of Gilgit-Baltistan

The northern tip of Ladakh Range runs south of Karakoram into Baltistan. Most of the region is characterised by steep valleys and highly rugged terrain, with Deosai Plateau creating a notable contrast in southeastern Baltistan. Covering an area of over 3,500 km^{2} (1,400 sq mi), it is located above the tree line and constitutes the second-highest plateau in the world after Tibet, at 4,115 metres (13,501 ft). It was declared a national park in 1993.

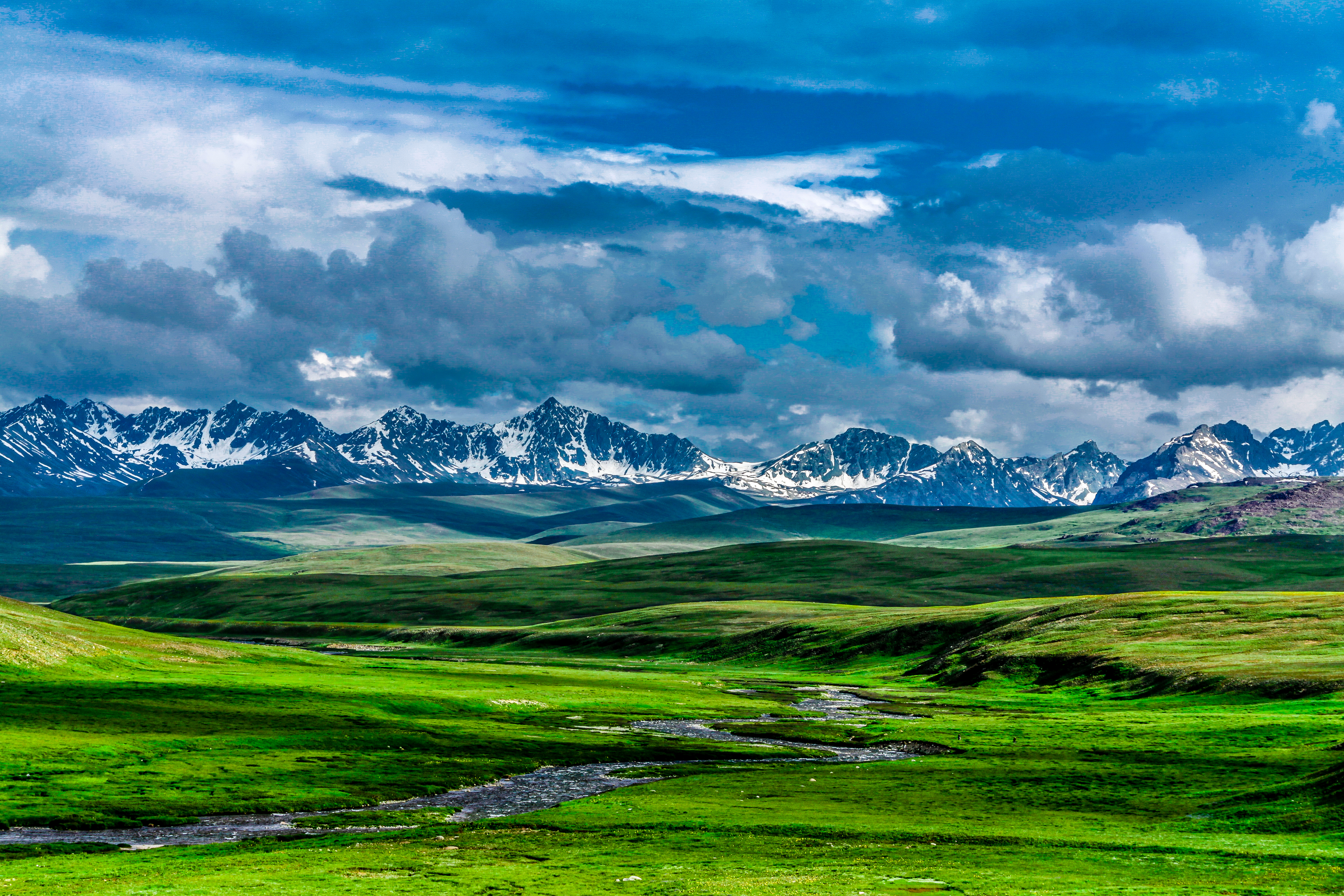
Deosai Mountains are located in the east of Deosai Plains

The tripoint of Himalayas, Karakoram and Hindu Kush is located at the confluence of Gilgit River with Indus near Jaglot. Here 8,126 m high Nanga Parbat (Diamer) forms the western anchor of Himalayas. The Indus River Valley divides the Himalayas from Hindu Kush.

Gilgit-Baltistan has a high-mountain desert environment. Indus is the main river traversing Gilgit-Baltistan. Along its course a number of tributaries drain into it including Shyok, Gilgit, Astore, Shigar and Hunza, mainly fed by the melting glacial ice. The valleys thus cut by the rivers support human habitation. The population is mainly concentrated in the river valleys, notably in those of Indus, (Note: Along its course, various sections of Indus River Valley are named (downstream from east to west) as Kharmang Valley, Skardu Valley, and Roundu Valley. Geographically they are continuous to each other.) Shigar, Shyok (Chorbat), Astore, Gultari, Gilgit, Hunza, Yasin, and Ishkoman. A large part of Gilgit-Baltistan is uninhabitable due to slope, aridity or height.

Natural forests cover 3.6% or 2,492 km^{2} (962 sq mi) of Gilgit-Baltistan as of 2021, while over 81% or 56,784 km^{2} (21,924 sq mi) of area consists of glaciers and mountains.

=== Fauna ===
The fauna of Gilgit-Baltistan includes snow leopard, Himalayan brown bear, Himalayan black bear, Himalayan ibex, blue sheep, Astor markhor, Ladakh urial, Himalayan marmot, Marco Polo sheep, Himalayan wolf, Himalayan red fox, Kashmir musk deer, Himalayan goral, mountain weasel, yellow-throated marten, Himalayan lynx, Pallas's cat, cape hare, and woolly flying squirrel. The avian species include golden eagle, Himalayan vulture, laggar falcon, peregrine falcon, Eurasian kestrel, Eurasian sparrowhawk, Himalayan snowcock, Himalayan monal, koklass pheasant, and Himalayan griffon. The region is home to 54 mammal, 230 bird and 4 reptile species.

Over one-third of Gilgit-Baltistan is protected in the form of national parks and wildlife sanctuaries. It is home to 7 national parks: Khunjerab, Deosai, Central Karakoram, Himalaya, Nanga Parbat, Qurumbar and Shandur. Collectively, they comprise an area of 24,167 km^{2} (9,331 sq mi).

=== Climate ===
The climate of Gilgit-Baltistan varies from region to region, since the surrounding mountain ranges create sharp variations in weather. The eastern part has the moist zone of the western Himalayas, but going toward Karakoram and Hindu Kush, the climate gets considerably drier.

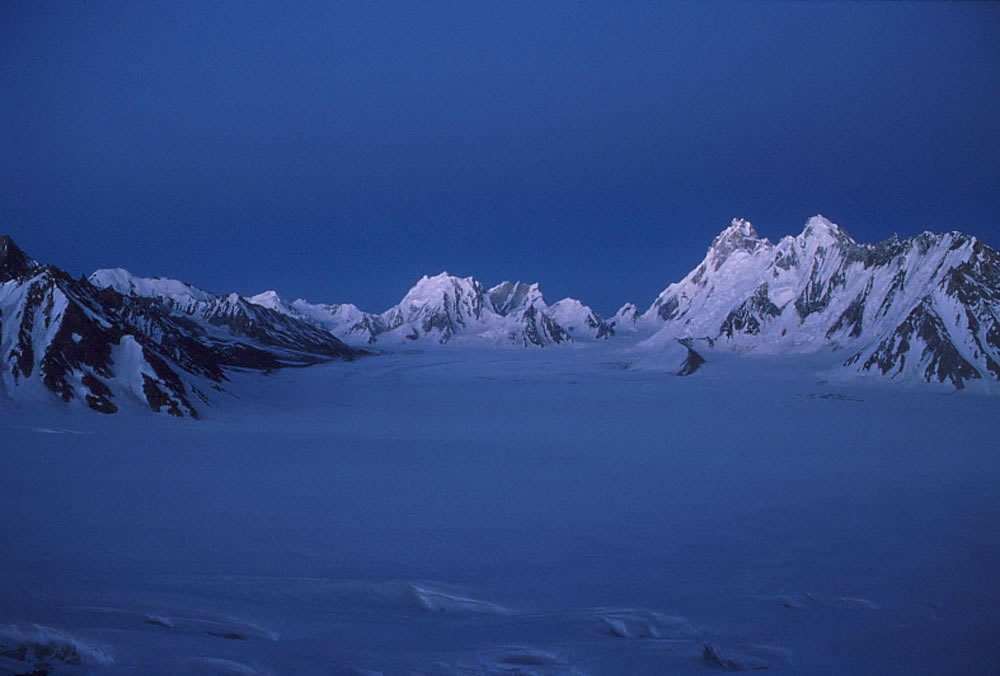
Snow Lake at the junction of Biafo and Hispar Glaciers

There are towns like Gilgit and Chilas that are very hot during the day in summer yet cold at night and valleys like Astore, Khaplu, Yasin, Hunza, and Nagar, where the temperatures remain cold even in summer.

==== Climate Change Effects ====
Climate change has adversely affected this region with changing rainfall patterns. On 26 August 2022, most villages in Ghizer district and Hunza were severely effected by the flooding, displacing many people.

== Government ==
While under the Pakistani administrative jurisdiction since the First Kashmir War, Gilgit-Baltistan has never been formally integrated into the state and does not participate in the country's constitutional political affairs. Traditionally, the Pakistani government had rejected Gilgit-Baltistani calls for integration with Pakistan on the grounds that it would jeopardise its demands for the whole Kashmir issue to be resolved according to UN resolutions.

=== Administration ===
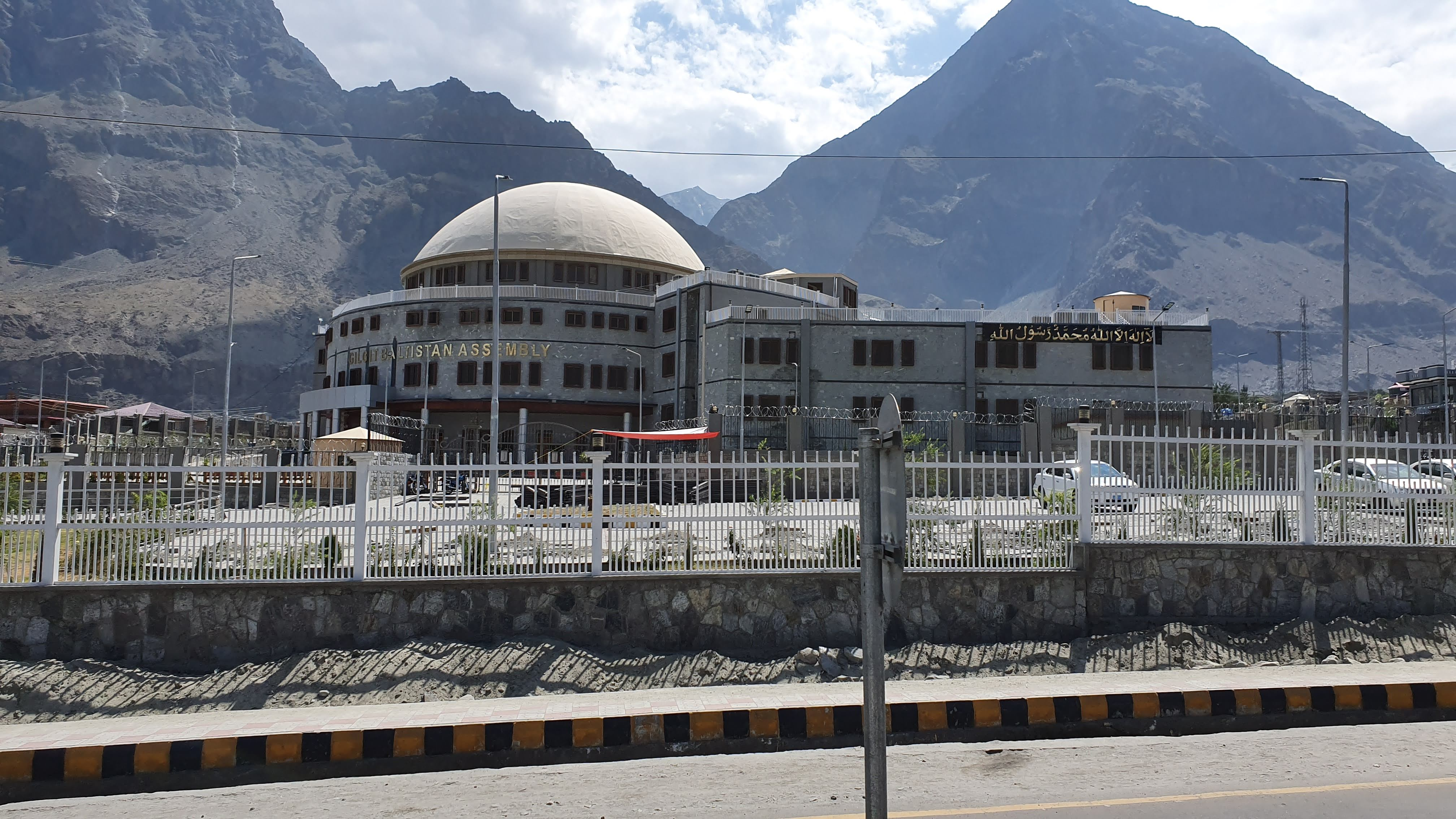
Gilgit-Baltistan Assembly building in Jutial, Gilgit

Currently, Gilgit-Baltistan is neither a province nor a state. It has a semi-provincial status. The present set-up of the Government of Gilgit-Baltistan is laid out by the Government of Gilgit-Baltistan Order, 2018, which replaced Gilgit-Baltistan Empowerment and Self-Governance Order, 2009. Under it the Gilgit-Baltistan Assembly is the unicameral legislature of the territory operating under a parliamentary system and comprises thirty-three seats (twenty-four general seats, six reserved for women and three reserved for technocrats and professionals). Governor is the head of territory, appointed by President of Pakistan, while Chief Minister is the head of government, elected by the assembly. Chief Minister is supported by a cabinet of ministers selected from among the members of assembly. Gilgit-Baltistan Council acts as link between federal and Gilgit-Baltistan government, with Prime Minister of Pakistan as its Chairman and Governor of Gilgit-Baltistan as its Vice-Chairman. Since its establishment in 2009, there have been four general elections of Gilgit-Baltistan Assembly (in 2009, 2015, 2020 and 2026). Elections are overseen by Election Commission Gilgit-Baltistan.

=== Subdivisions ===
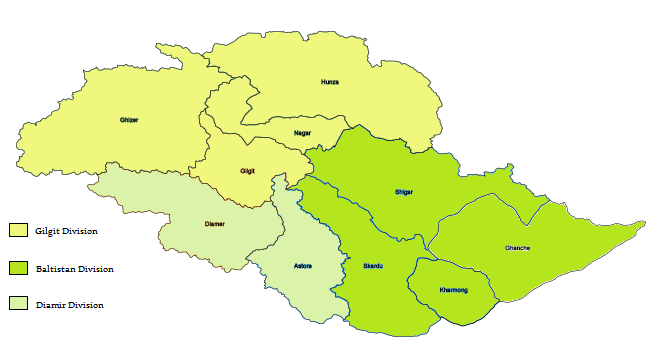
Divisions and districts of Gilgit-Baltistan

As of 2024, Gilgit-Baltistan is administratively divided into three divisions: Baltistan, Diamer and Gilgit, which in turn are divided into ten districts and thirty-four tehsils. The principal administrative centres are the towns of Gilgit, Skardu and Chilas.

Division	District	Area (km^{2})	Capital	Population (2023)
Baltistan	Ghanche	8,531	Khaplu	157,822
Baltistan	Shigar	4,173	Shigar	84,608
Baltistan	Kharmang	6,144	Kharmang	61,304
Baltistan	Skardu	10,168	Skardu	278,885
Gilgit	Gilgit	4,208	Gilgit	324,552
Gilgit	Ghizer	12,381	Gahkuch	200,069
Gilgit	Hunza	10,109	Aliabad	65,497
Gilgit	Nagar	4,137	Nagar	87,410
Diamer	Diamer	7,234	Chilas	337,329
Diamer	Astore	5,411	Eidghah	111,573
Total		72,496		1,709,049

=== Law enforcement and security ===
Gilgit-Baltistan Chief Court acts as the court of appeals in the territory. Its status is equal to the high courts in other provinces. Its decisions are appealed to Supreme Appellate Court Gilgit-Baltistan. The decisions of Supreme Appellate Court in turn can be appealed to the Supreme Court of Pakistan.

Security in Gilgit-Baltistan is provided by the Gilgit-Baltistan Police, the Gilgit Baltistan Scouts (a paramilitary force), and the Northern Light Infantry (part of the Pakistan Army).

== Economy ==
Historically, the Silk Road connected Gilgit-Baltistan with central and east Asia, along which caravans carried goods to and from the region. The regional economy is mainly based on agriculture, especially horticulture, and tourism. As of 2021, the gross state product (GSP) nominal of Gilgit-Baltistan was estimated to be $2.28 billion. The establishment of a chamber of commerce and the Sust dry port in Gojal, Hunza are notable milestones. Since 2018, Special Communications Organization has launched initiatives to promote IT sector in the region. In 2025, freelancers and IT firms based in Gilgit-Baltistan earned over $17.5 million in revenue.

=== Tourism ===
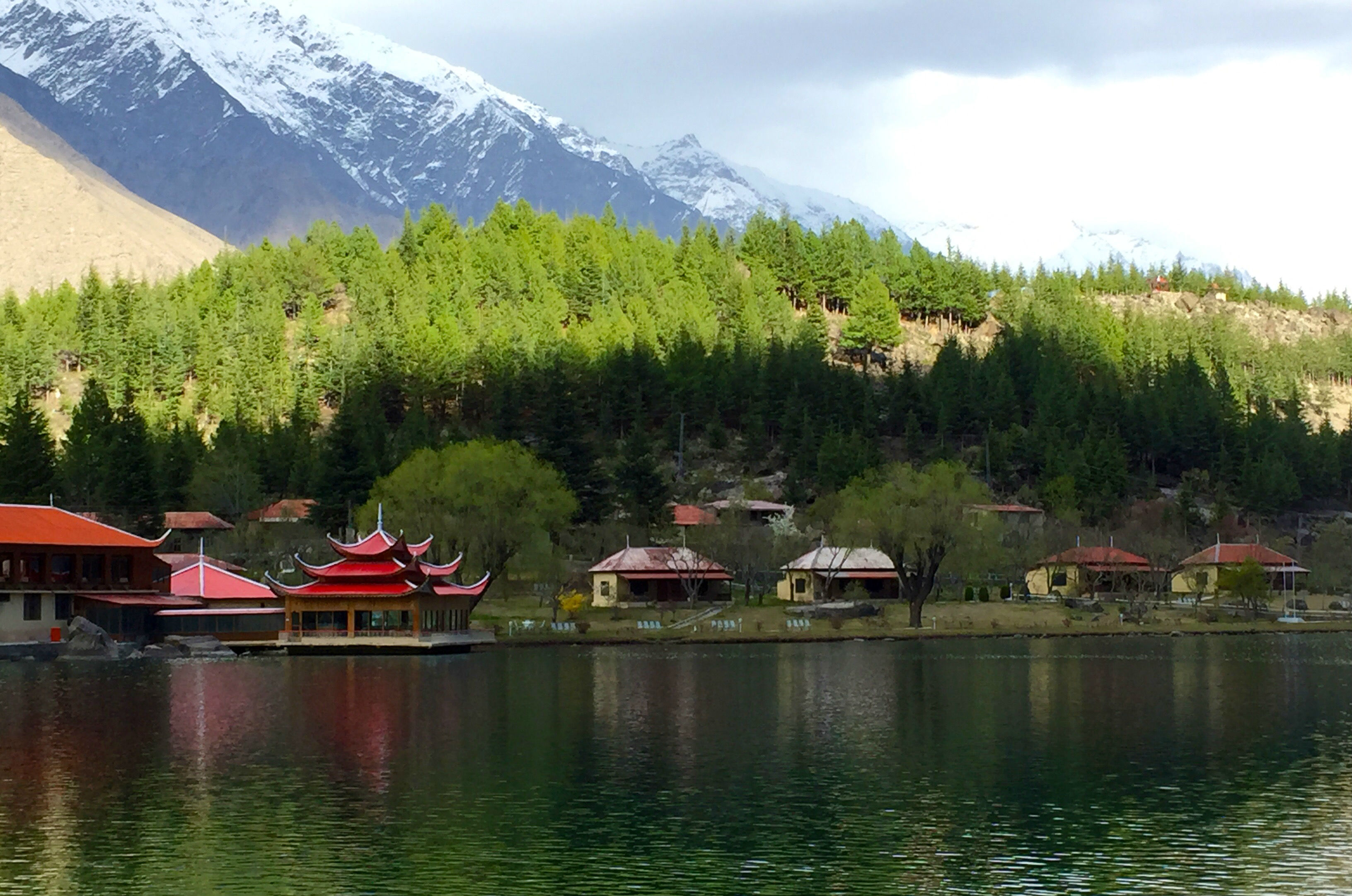
Shangri-la Lake in Skardu

Tourism is mostly trekking and mountaineering, and has been growing in importance. It contributed over 17% to the regional GDP in 2021. The landscape includes mountains, lakes, glaciers and valleys. K2 Basecamp, Deosai, Naltar, Fairy Meadows, Bagrot Valley and Hushe Valley are notable tourist places.

There are, in addition, several high-altitude lakes in Gilgit-Baltistan, such as Sheosar Lake in the Deosai Plains, Naltar lakes in the Naltar Valley, Satpara Tso Lake and Katzura Tso Lake in Skardu, Zharba Tso Lake in Shigar, Lake Kharfak in Gangche, Borith Lake in Gojal, Rama Lake in Astore, Rush Lake in Nagar, and Karambar Lake in Ishkoman Valley.

==== Mountaineering ====
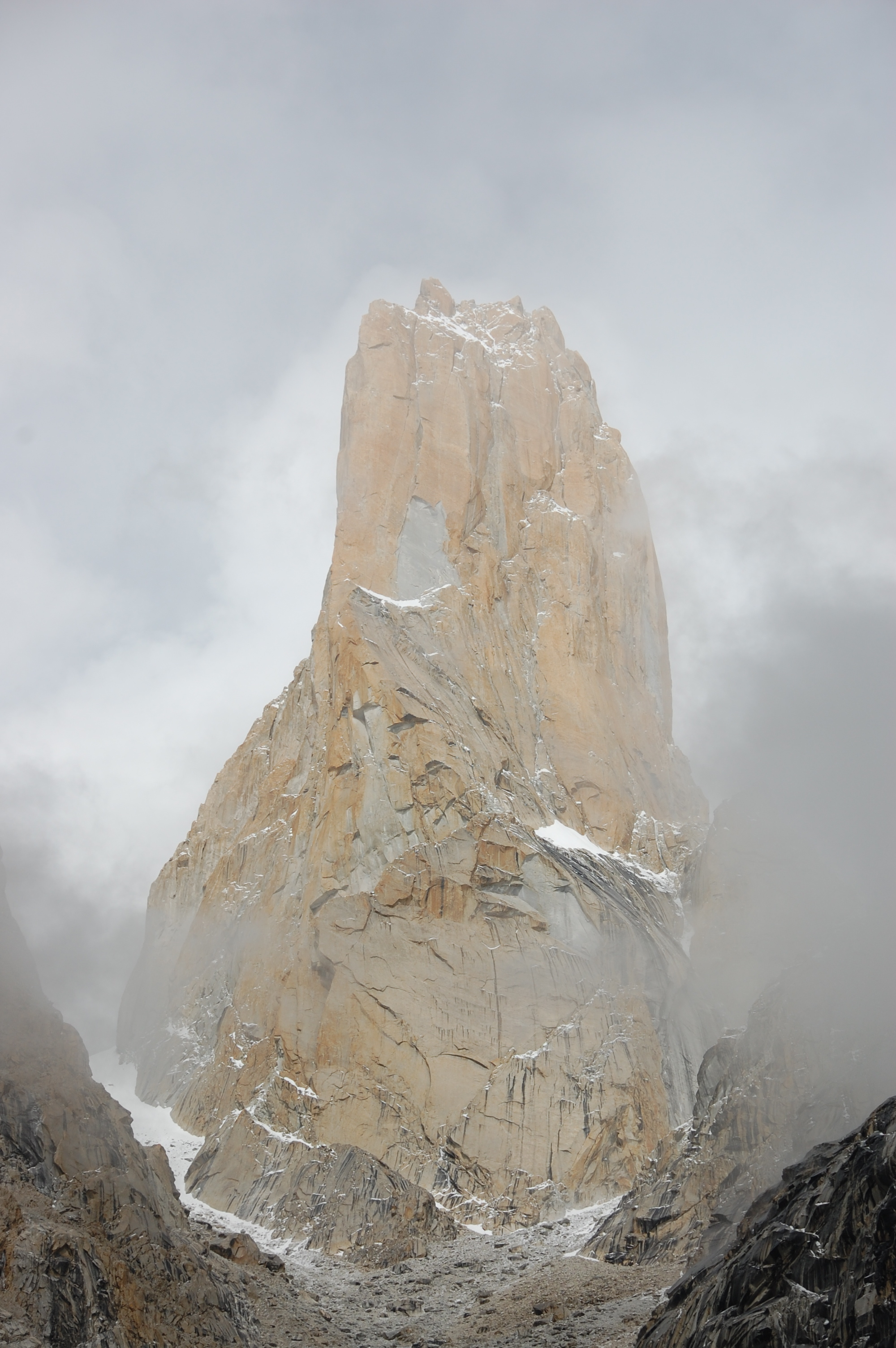
The Trango Towers feature the greatest nearly vertical drop in the world.

Gilgit-Baltistan is home to five "eight-thousanders" and to more than fifty peaks above 7,000 metres (23,000 ft), including K-2, the second highest mountain on Earth. Other well known peaks include Masherbrum (also known as K1), Broad Peak, Hidden Peak, Gasherbrum II, Gasherbrum IV, and Chogolisa, situated in Khaplu Valley. Gilgit and Skardu are the two main hubs for expeditions to those mountains.

=== Agriculture ===
Agricultural products are wheat, corn (maize), barley, and dry fruits. In 2020, Gilgit-Baltistan produced 81,416 metric tonnes (t) of fruits, the major products being apricot (61,188 t), apple, (6,606 t), cherry (4,500 t), walnut (4,178 t), mulberry (1,937 t) and grape (1,367 t).

=== Hydropower ===
Gilgit-Baltistan has a vast hydropower potential. In September 2009, Pakistan signed an agreement with the People's Republic of China for a major energy project in Gilgit-Baltistan which includes the construction of a 7,000-megawatt Bunji Dam in the Astore District. The under construction Diamer-Bhasha Dam will be the largest dam in Pakistan upon completion. The Satpara Dam serves Skardu.

=== Infrastructure ===
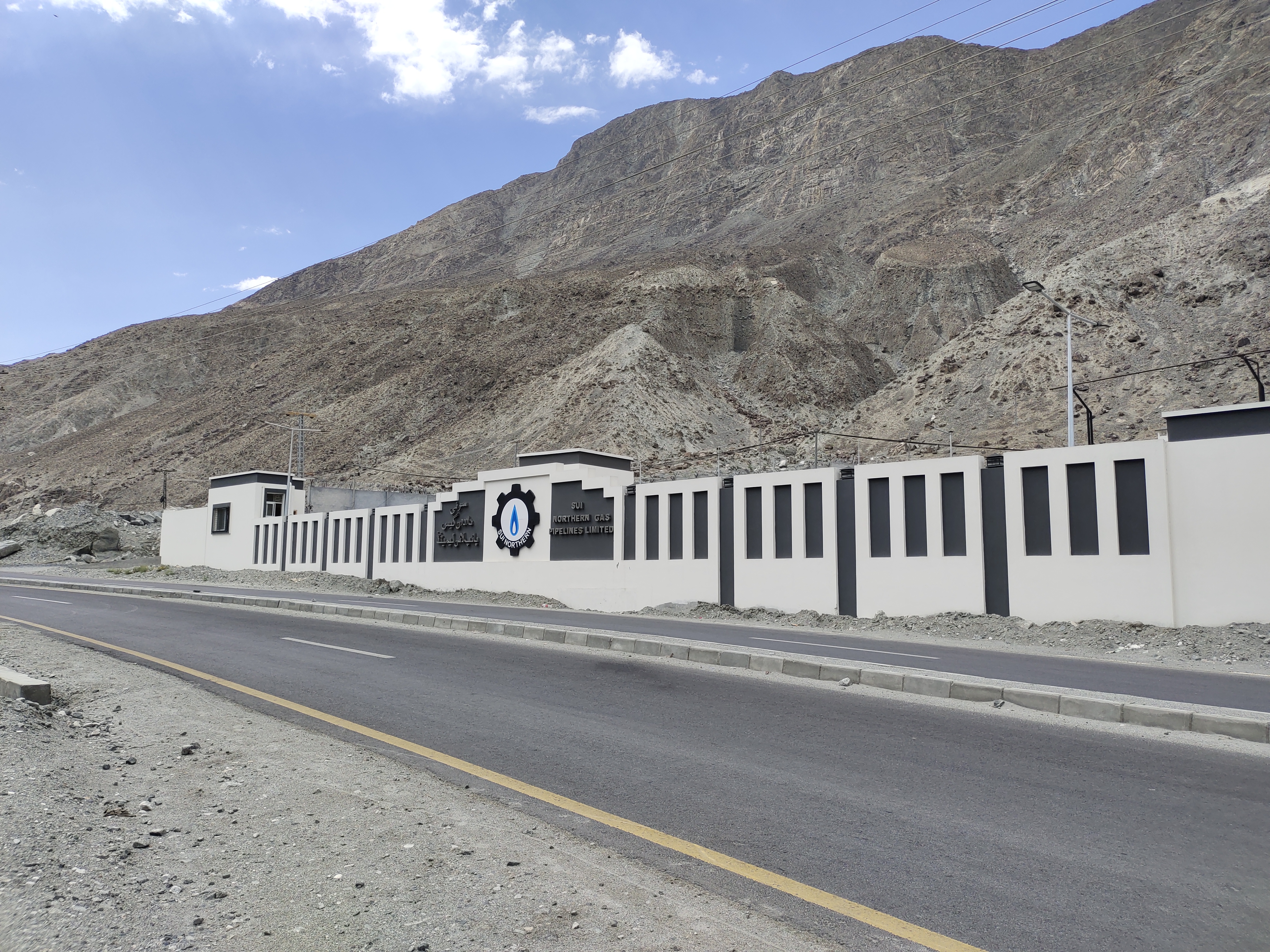
Sui Northern Gas Pipelines Limited LPG Air Mix Plant in Gilgit

In 2020, Sui Northern Gas Pipelines Limited unveiled LPG (Liquefied Petroleum Gas) Air Mix Plant project for supply of domestic gas to Gilgit, which is expected to reduce deforestation as public uses wood from trees for heating and lighting purpose. The first head office has been built in Gilgit. The China–Pakistan Economic Corridor connects Xinjiang and the hinterland of Pakistan through Gilgit-Baltistan, and the Government of Pakistan hopes that residents of Gilgit-Baltistan will benefit from CPEC and other development projects.

== Transportation ==
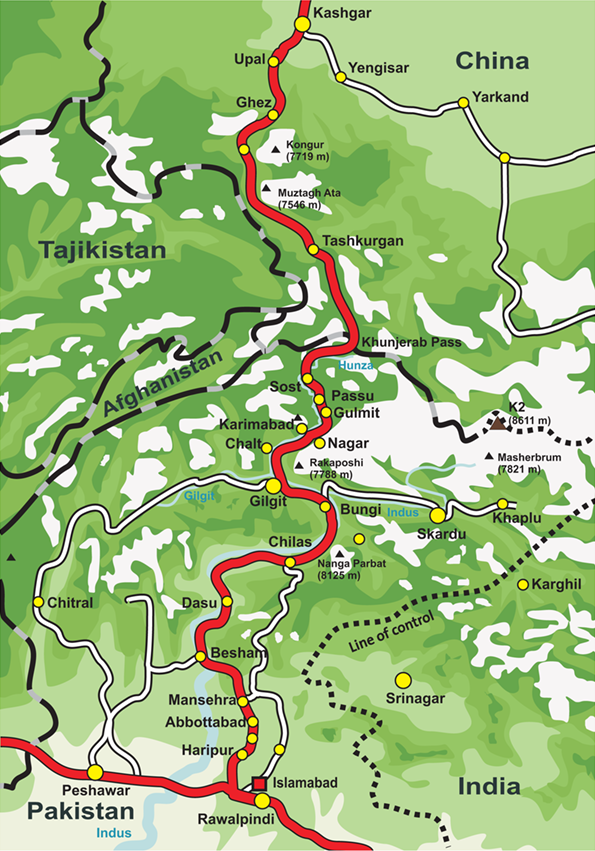
The Karakoram Highway

=== Roads ===
The N-35 National Highway, better known as Karakoram Highway (KKH), is the primary national highway which connects Gilgit-Baltistan with the rest of the country. Constructed in 1978, it extends from Hasan Abdal in the Punjab province to the Khunjerab Pass, connecting Gilgit with the country's capital Islamabad. Beyond Khunjerab Pass it crosses into China and becomes China National Highway 314. Out of total of 887 km length, 516 km lie in Gilgit-Baltistan. The 240 km long N-15 National Highway connects Chilas in Diamer with Mansehra in Hazara Division through Babusar Pass, and is in use as an alternative route to N-35. The National Highways Authority is developing N-140 National Highway by connecting Gilgit–Shandur Road with Shandur–Chitral Road via Shandur Pass. It is expected to be opened by December 2026, and will link Gilgit to Chitral, and from Chitral to other cities in northern Pakistan. Skardu is connected to Karakoram Highway through S-1 Strategic Highway (also known as Baltistan Highway) at Juglot. Beyond Skardu, Skardu–Kargil Road leads to LoC, however its last section is closed since 1948 as Kargil now lies in Indian-administered Ladakh. Currently it runs until the village of Olding.

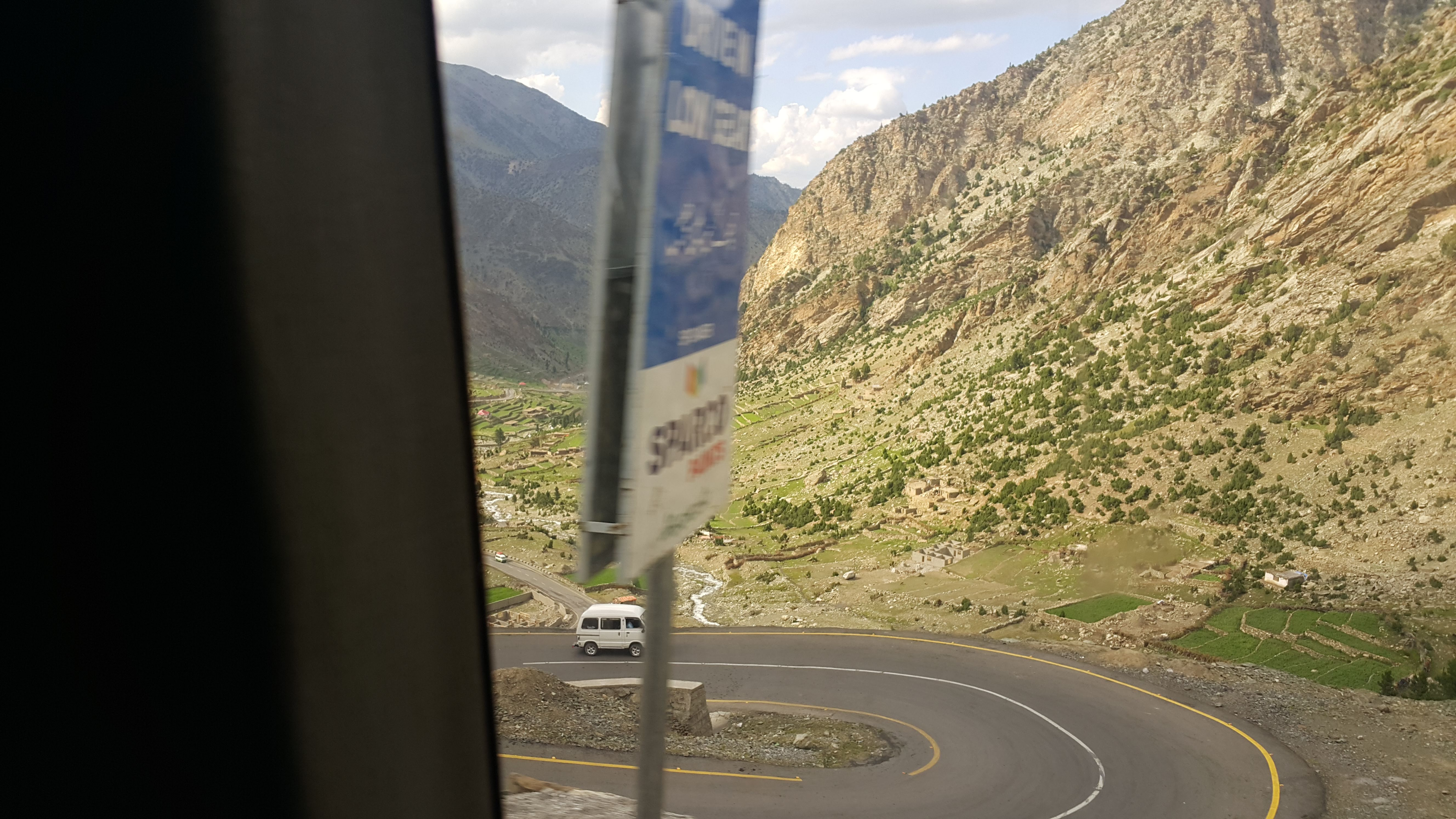
National Highway N-15 at Babusar Pass

Before the construction of the Karakoram Highway (KKH) in 1978, Gilgit-Baltistan was cut off from the rest of the Pakistan and the world due to the harsh terrain and the lack of accessible roads. The Karakoram Highway connects Gilgit to Tashkurgan Town, Kashgar, China via Sust, the customs and health-inspection post on the Gilgit-Baltistan side, and the Khunjerab Pass, the highest paved international border crossing in the world at 4,693 metres (15,397 ft). The journey from Rawalpindi / Islamabad to Gilgit takes approximately 20 to 24 hours. Northern Areas Transport Corporation (NATCO) offers bus and jeep transport service to the two hubs and several other popular destinations, lakes, and glaciers in the area.

=== Air ===
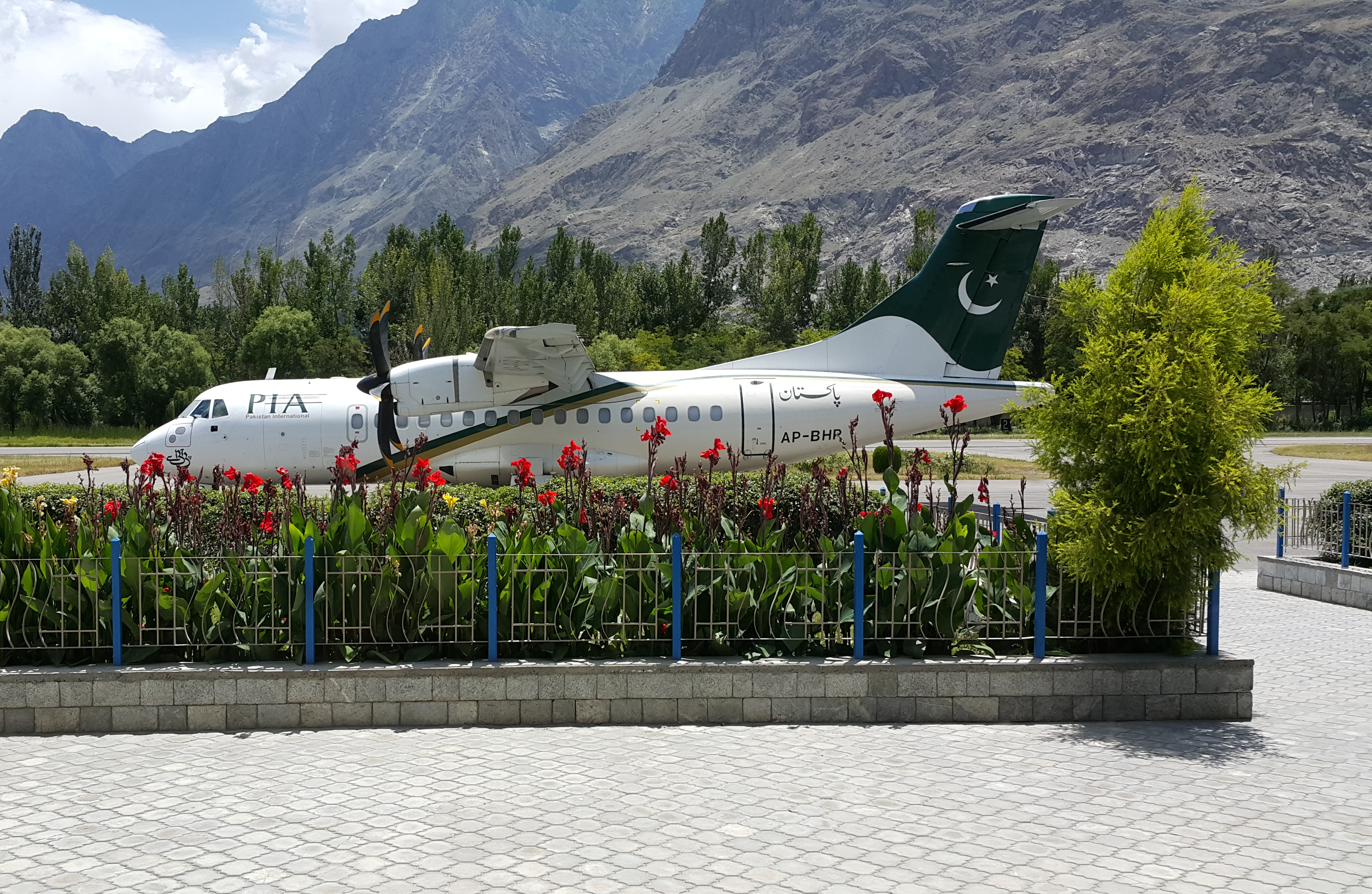
ATR 42–500 in Gilgit Airport. Picture taken on 10 July 2016

Skardu International Airport is one of the two airports in Gilgit-Baltistan. It receives domestic flights from Karachi, Lahore and Islamabad, and since 2023, international flights from Dubai in the United Arab Emirates. Gilgit Airport also receives domestic flights from across the country. Skardu International Airport is adjacent to Qadri airbase which serves as forward operating base for Northern Air Command of Pakistan Air Force.

=== Railways ===
A railway through the region has been proposed; see Khunjerab Railway for details.

== Demographics ==
=== Population ===
Population census
Year	Pop.	±% p.a.
1941	234,727	—
1951	255,900	+0.87%
1961	308,194	+1.88%
1972	416,892	+2.78%
1981	573,614	+3.61%
1998	870,347	+2.48%
2017	1,492,924	+2.88%
2023	1,709,049	+2.28%

The population of Gilgit Baltistan is 1,709,049 as of 2023. Around 20% of population is based in the cities of Gilgit and Skardu; approximately 83.5% of the population was rural in 2017. The fertility rate is 4.7 children per woman, which is the highest in Pakistan. The overall population growth rate between 1998 and 2011 was 63.1% making it 4.85% annually. The literacy rate of Gilgit-Baltistan is approximately 72%.

=== Ethnicity ===
The population of Gilgit-Baltistan consists of many diverse linguistic, ethnic, and religious sects, due in part to the many isolated valleys separated by some of the world's highest mountains. The main ethnic groups in Gilgit-Baltistan include Balti, Shina, Burusho, Kho, Wakhi, Yashkun, Gujjar, Kashmiri, and Mughal.

Gilgit-Baltistan is also home to smaller minority groups. These include Bakarwals, Kohistanis, Brokpas, Pathans, Soniwals, Hors, Kyrgyz, Uyghrs, and Kashgaris.

In the Himalayan region of Gilgit-Baltistan, pastoralism is still practised by several ethnic communities. These communities include the Balti, Gujjar, Bakarwal, Wakhi, Uygur, Shina, Yashkun, and Kyrgyz. A significant number of people from Gilgit-Baltistan are residing in other parts of Pakistan, mainly in Punjab and Karachi.

=== Languages ===
Estimated share of languages spoken in Gilgit-Baltistan in 2017 (Note: Based on 2016–17 MICS Household Survey and 2017 Census.)
1. Balti (37.9%)
2. Shina (35.9%)
3. Brushaski (17.1%)
4. Khowar (3.16%)
5. Wakhi (2.48%)
6. Others (3.53%)

Gilgit-Baltistan is a multilingual region where Urdu being a national and official language serves as the lingua franca for inter ethnic communications. English is co-official and also used in education, while Arabic is used for religious purposes. The table below shows a break-up of Gilgit-Baltistan first-language speakers.

Rank	Language	Detail
1	Shina	It is a Dardic language spoken by the majority in thirteen tehsils (Gilgit, Goharabad, Chilas, Darel, Tangir, Astore, Shounter, Babusar, Punial, Danoyre, Jaglot, Shinaki and Roundu).
2	Balti	It is spoken by the majority in twelve tehsils (Skardu, Shigar, Daghoni Kharmang, Gultari, Chorbat, Keris, Gulabpur, Gamba, Haldi, Khaplu and Mashabrum) of Baltistan. It is from the Tibetan language family and has Urdu borrowings.
3	Burushaski	It is spoken by the majority in five tehsils (Nagar 1, Aliabad, Chalt, Nagar II, and Yasin). It is a language isolate that has borrowed considerable Urdu vocabulary.
4	Khowar	It is spoken by the majority in three tehsils (Gupis, Ishkoman and Phander) but also spoken in Yasin and Punial/Gahkuch Tehsils. Like Shina, it is a Dardic language.
5	Wakhi	It is spoken by the majority of people in Gojal Tehsil of Hunza. But it is also spoken in the Yasin and Ishkomen tehsils of Ghizer District. It is classified as eastern Iranian or Pamiri language.
6	Domaaki-Gujari	Domaki: is mainly spoken by Domas in Gilgit region and Hunza valley). Gujari: is mainly spoken in Nagar, and Gilgit districts, Naltar, Bala and Astore valleys and Barjungle village in Ghizer district.
Unranked	Others	Pashto, Kashmiri, Kyrgyz, Purgi, and Sarikoli languages are also spoken by a significant number of people of the region.

=== Religion ===
Share of sects in Gilgit-Baltistan
Sects	Percent
Twelver Shi'a Islam	39.85%
Sunni Islam	30.05%
Isma'ili Shi'a Islam	24%
Nurbakhshia Islam	6.1%

The population of Gilgit-Baltistan is entirely Muslim and is denominationally the most diverse in the country. The region is also the only Shia-plurality area in an otherwise Sunni-dominant Pakistan. People in the Shigar, Kharmang and Skardu districts are mostly Shi'a, while Diamir and Astore districts have Sunni majority. Ghanche has a Nurbakhshia population, and Ghizar has an Isma'ili majority. The populations in Gilgit, Hunza and Nagar districts are composed of a mix of all of these sects. Recent surveys show that Shi'a Isma'ili women, both rural and urban, have high rates of contraceptives usage and low fertility rates; by contrast Sunni women, especially in rural areas, have low rates of contraceptive usage and high fertility rates.

== Culture ==
Architecture

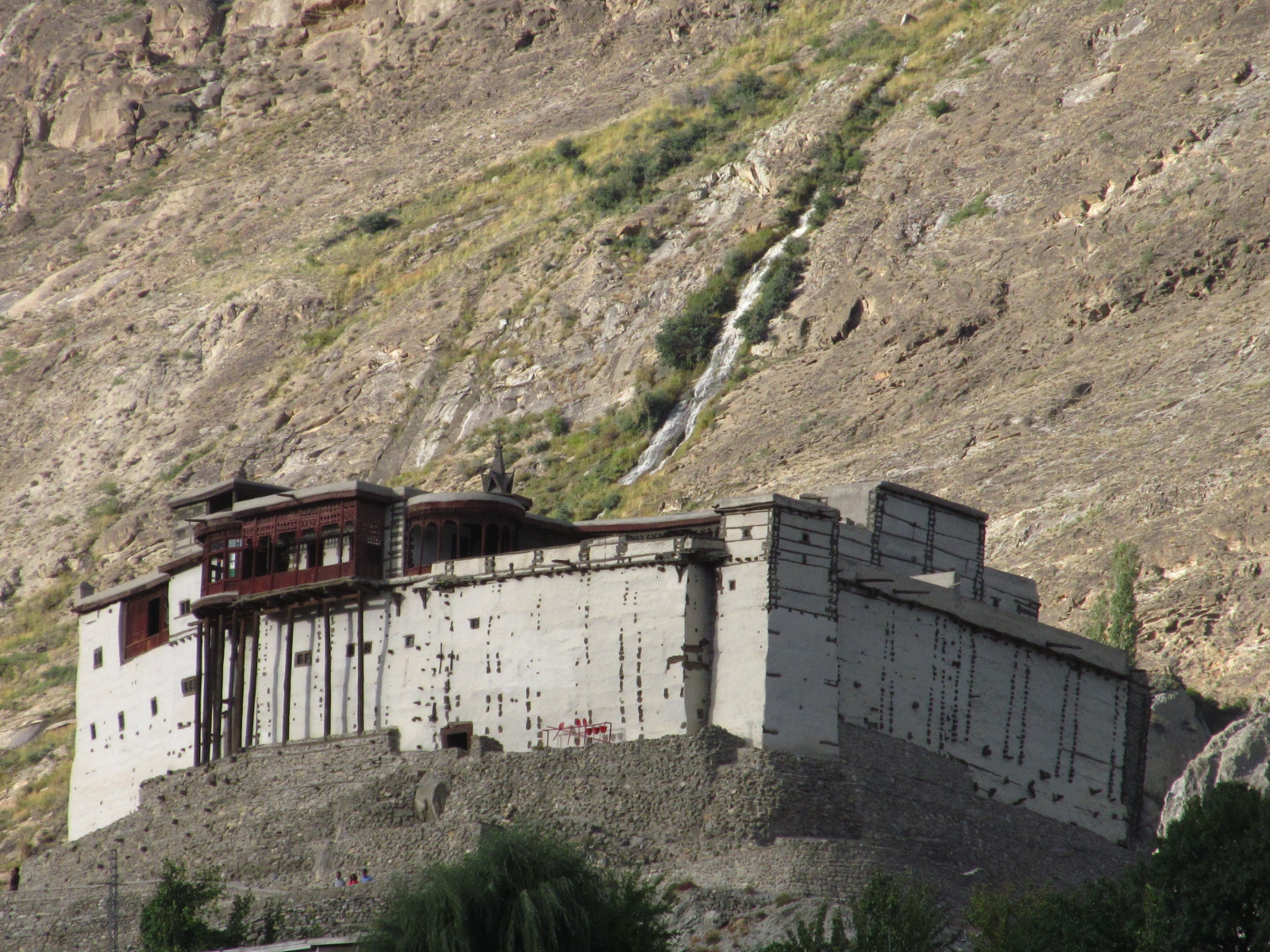
Baltit fort, Hunza

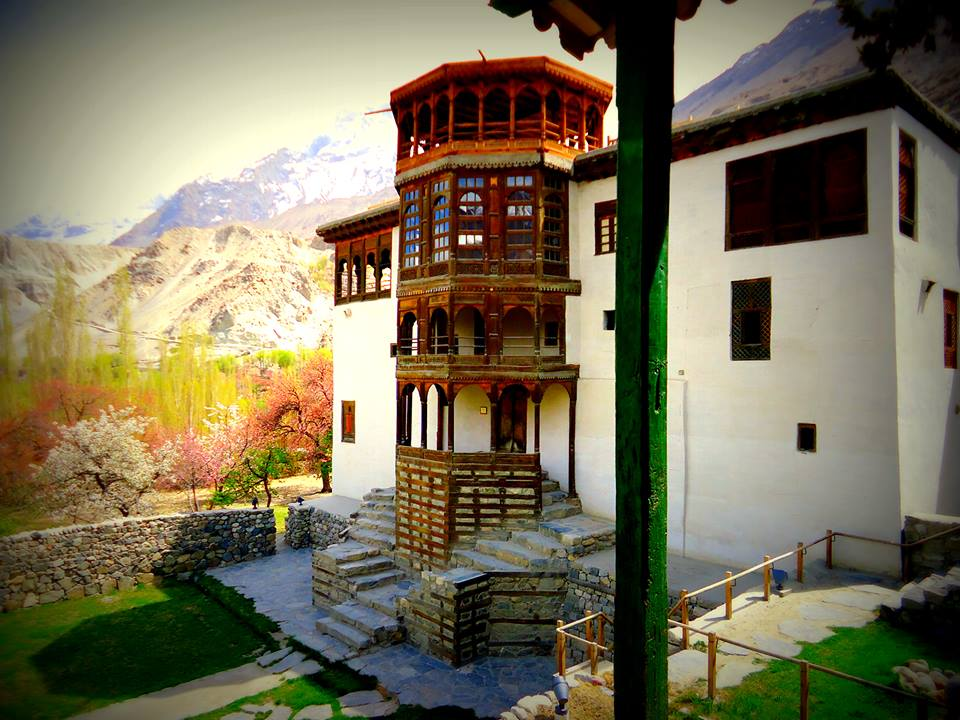
Khaplu Palace

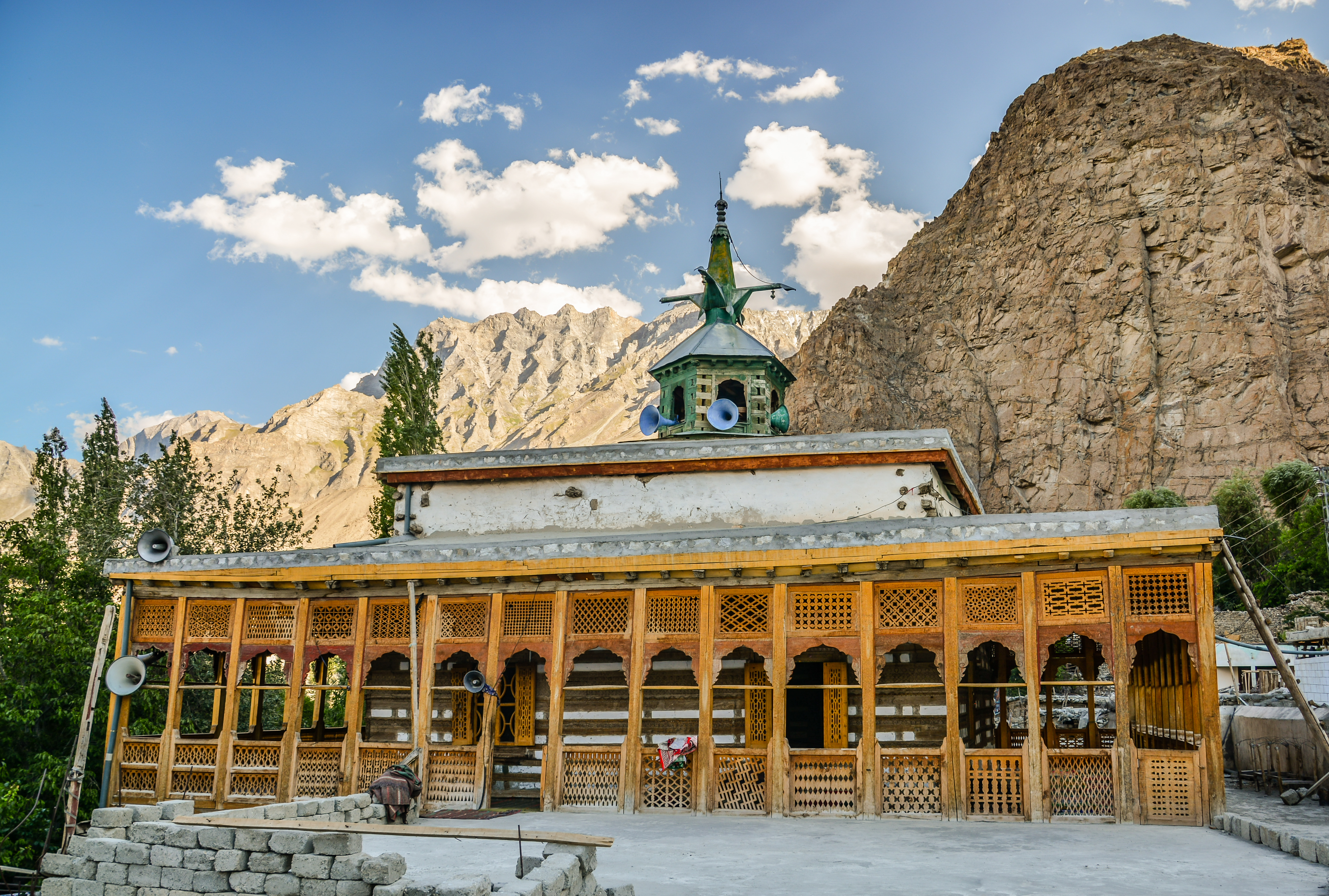
Chaqchan Mosque, Khaplu

The architecture of Gilgit-Baltistan is influenced by the Tibetan Architecture.

Gilgit-Baltistan is home to diversified cultures, ethnic groups, languages and backgrounds. Major cultural events include the Shandur Polo Festival, Babusar Polo Festival and Jashn-e-Baharan or the Harvest Time Festival (Navroz). Traditional dances include: Old Man Dance in which more than one person wears old-style dresses; Cow Boy Dance (Payaloo) in which a person wears old style dress, long leather shoes and holds a stick in hand and the Sword Dance in which the participants show taking one sword in right and shield in left. One to six participants can dance in pairs.

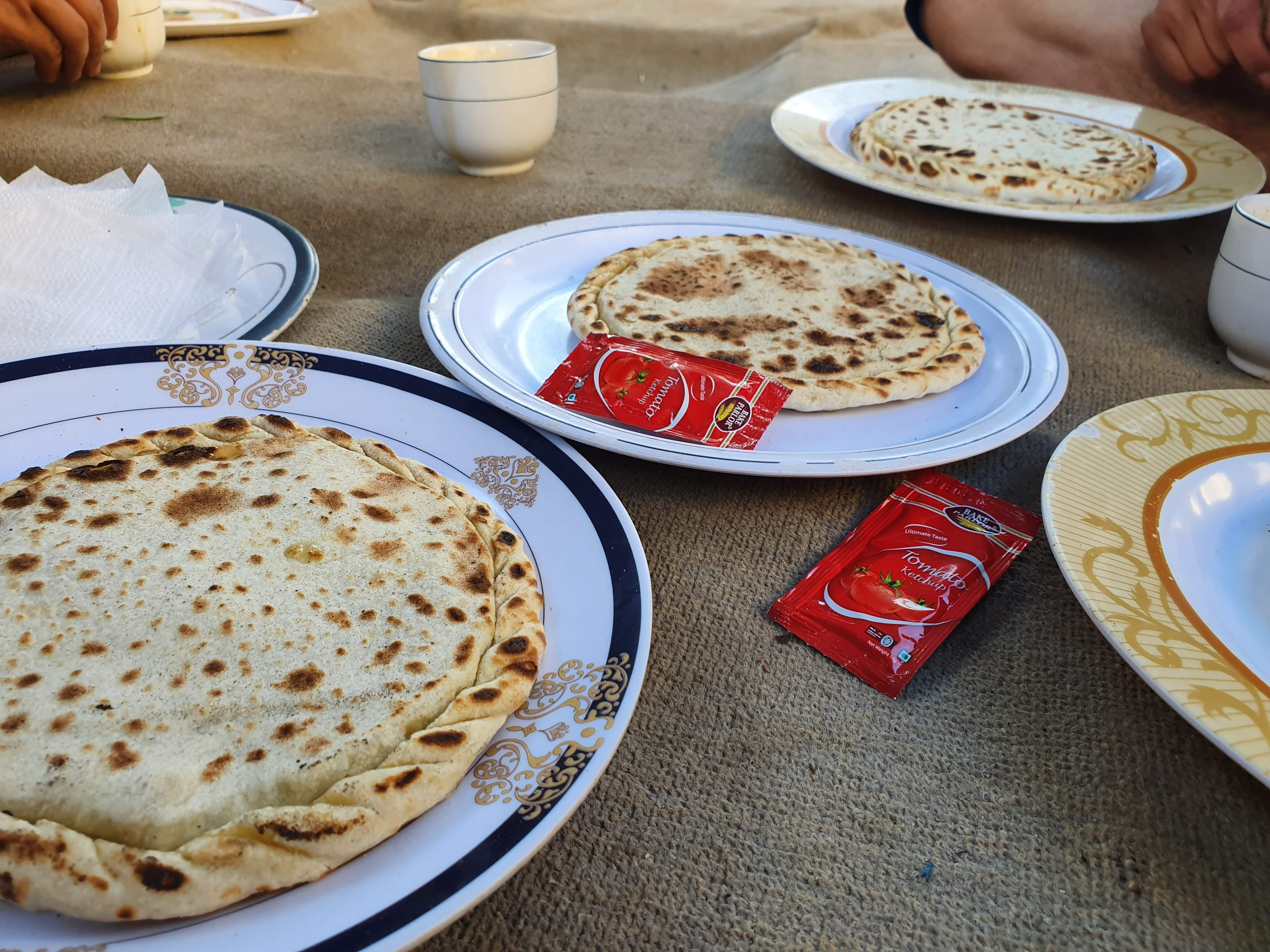
One of the region's popular dishes is Chapchor. It is widely made in the Nagar and Hunza Valley

A popular dish in Gilgit-Baltistan is rdoong balay, a stew made of ground wheat, potatoes, peas, and spices. It is eaten on the holiday of Eid al-Fitr.

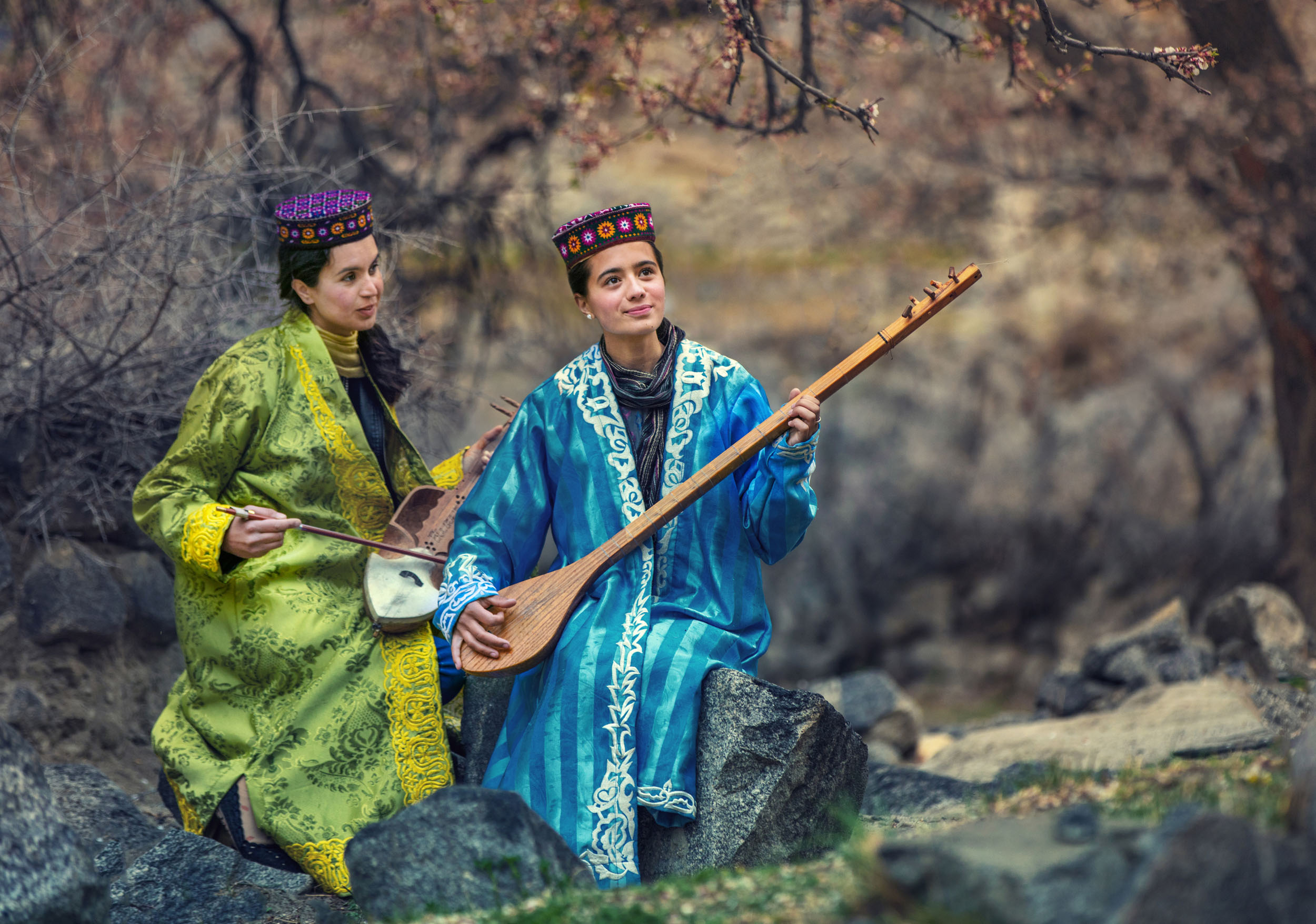
Wakhi musicians in Gulmit.

=== Rock art and petroglyphs ===
There are more than 50,000 pieces of rock art (petroglyphs) and inscriptions all along the Karakoram Highway in Gilgit-Baltistan, concentrated at ten major sites between Hunza and Shatial. The carvings were left by invaders, traders, and pilgrims who passed along the trade route, as well as by locals. The earliest date back to between 5000 and 1000 BCE, showing single animals, triangular men and hunting scenes in which the animals are larger than the hunters. These carvings were pecked into the rock with stone tools and are covered with a thick patina that proves their age.

The ethnologist Karl Jettmar has pieced together the history of the area from inscriptions and recorded his findings in Rock Carvings and Inscriptions in the Northern Areas of Pakistan and the later-released Between Gandhara and the Silk Roads—Rock Carvings Along the Karakoram Highway. Many of these carvings and inscriptions will be inundated and/or destroyed when the planned Basha-Diamir dam is built and the Karakoram Highway is widened.

== Education ==
In 2002, Karakoram International University was inaugurated by President Pervez Musharraf at Gilgit, with satellite campuses at Hunza, Chilas, Skardu and Ghizer. The KIU campus at Skardu was promoted to an independent university, University of Baltistan, in 2017. As of 2024, the region has 13 intermediate colleges, 14 degree colleges, and 2 cadet colleges, in addition to 2028 primary, 615 middle, 451 high and 135 higher secondary schools.

== Sports ==
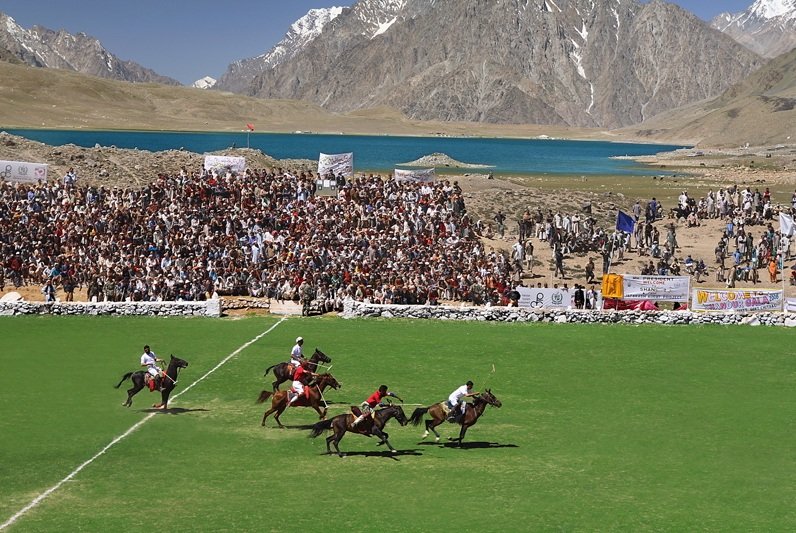
Polo in progress with Shandur lake in background, Shandur, Ghizer District.

Many types of sports are played throughout the region, but the most popular of them is polo. Almost every large valley has a polo ground. Polo matches in such grounds attract locals as well as foreign visitors during summer season. One of such polo tournament is held in Shandur each year and polo teams of Gilgit with Chitral participate. Although unlikely, some historians like Ahmed Hasan Dani suggest that it originated from Gilgit-Baltistan. As evidence, they present the Balti version of the Epic of King Gesar in which King Gesar is said to have started Polo sport by killing his stepson and hitting head of his body with a stick. They also suggest that the simple rules of local Polo game testifies its primitiveness. The English word Polo has Balti origin and dates back to the 19th century, meaning ball.

Other popular sports are football, cricket, volleyball (mostly played in winter) and other minor local sports. With growing facilities and suitable geography, mountaineering, trekking and other similar sports are also gaining popularity. Samina Baig from Hunza is one of the only Pakistani women to climb Mount Everest, having done so at the age of 21 while Hassan Sadpara from Skardu is the first Pakistani to have climbed six eight-thousanders, including Everest and the five eight-thousanders of Gilgit-Baltistan.

== See also ==
- Northern Pakistan
- List of cities in Gilgit Baltistan
- List of cultural heritage sites in Gilgit-Baltistan
- List of mountains in Pakistan

== Bibliography ==
- "Discord in Pakistan's Northern Areas" (PDF). Asia Report. Brussels: International Crisis Group. 2 April 2007. N°131. Archived from the original (PDF) on 20 May 2016.
- Bangash, Yaqoob Khan (2010), "Three Forgotten Accessions: Gilgit, Hunza and Nagar", The Journal of Imperial and Commonwealth History, 38 (1): 117–143, doi:10.1080/03086530903538269, S2CID 159652497
- Bansal, Alok (2007), "In Pursuit of Forced Assimilation: Sectarian and Ethnic Marginalisation in Gilgit-Baltistan", India Quarterly: A Journal of International Affairs, 63 (2): 56–80, doi:10.1177/097492840706300203, S2CID 153450836
- Burki, Shahid Javed (2015), Historical Dictionary of Pakistan, Rowman & Littlefield, p. 228, ISBN 978-1-4422-4148-0
- Behera, Navnita Chadha (2007), Demystifying Kashmir, Pearson Education India, ISBN 978-81-317-0846-0, archived from the original on 17 January 2023
- Bouzas, Antia Mato (12 January 2013), "Securitization and Development as Modes of Peripheralization in North-Eastern Pakistan", in Matthias Naumann; Andrea Fischer-Tahir (eds.), Peripheralization: The Making of Spatial Dependencies and Social Injustice, Springer Science & Business Media, pp. 77–98, ISBN 978-3-531-19018-1
- Hussain, Shafqat (2015), Remoteness and Modernity: Transformation and Continuity in Northern Pakistan, Yale University Press, p. 14, ISBN 978-0-300-20555-8, archived from the original on 10 October 2023
- Levy, Adrian; Scott-Clark, Catherine (2010), Deception: Pakistan, the United States, and the Secret Trade in Nuclear Weapons, Bloomsbury Publishing, ISBN 978-0-8027-1860-0, archived from the original on 24 July 2023
- Mahmud, Ershad (2008), "The Gilgit-Baltistan Reforms Package 2007: Background, Phases and Analysis", Policy Perspectives, 5 (1): 23–40, JSTOR 42909184
- Naumann, Matthias; Fischer-Tahir, Andrea (12 January 2013), Peripheralization: The Making of Spatial Dependencies and Social Injustice, Springer Science & Business Media, ISBN 978-3-531-19018-1
- Raman, B. (2009), "The Northern Areas of Jammu and Kashmir", in K. Warikoo (ed.), Himalayan Frontiers of India: Historical, Geo-Political and Strategic Perspectives, Routledge, pp. 78–88, ISBN 978-1-134-03294-5
- Schofield, Victoria (2003) [First published in 2000], Kashmir in Conflict, London and New York: I. B. Taurus & Co, ISBN 978-1-86064-898-4, archived from the original on 7 March 2023
- Sahni, Paul (2009), "The Ceasefire Line and Line of Control in Jammu and Kashmir: Evolution of a border", in K. Warikoo (ed.), Himalayan Frontiers of India: Historical, Geo-Political and Strategic Perspectives, Routledge, pp. 67–77, ISBN 978-1-134-03294-5
- Singh, Priyanka (2013), Gilgit Baltistan: Between Hope and Despair, New Delhi: Institute for Defence Studies and Analyses, ISBN 978-93-82169-13-0, archived from the original on 12 March 2016
- Snedden, Christopher (2013), Kashmir: The Unwritten History, HarperCollins India, ISBN 978-93-5029-897-8 First published as Snedden, Christopher (2012), The Untold Story of the People of Azad Kashmir, London: Hurst & Co., ISBN 978-18-4904-150-8
- Tucker, Spencer C.; Roberts, Priscilla (12 May 2008), The Encyclopedia of the Arab-Israeli Conflict: A Political, Social, and Military History [4 volumes]: A Political, Social, and Military History, ABC-CLIO, ISBN 978-1-85109-842-2
- Wang, S. (2004). "Of Rivers and Human Rights: the Northern Areas, Pakistan's Forgotten Colony in Jammu and Kashmir". International Journal on Minority and Group Rights. 11: 187. doi:10.1163/1571811041631272.
- Weightman, Barbara A. (2 December 2005). Dragons and Tigers: A Geography of South, East, and Southeast Asia (2nd ed.). John Wiley & Sons. p. 193. ISBN 978-0-471-63084-5.
- Wreford, R.G. (1942), Census of India, 1941, Volume XXII – Jammu and Kashmir, Parts I & II, The Ranbir Government Press
- Wreford, R.G. (1942), Census of India, 1941, Volume XXII – Jammu and Kashmir, Part III (PDF), The Ranbir Government Press, archived (PDF) from the original on 14 April 2021
