= Shahreis =

- Status: Monarchy
- Religion: Buddhism, Hinduism
Succeeded by
Trakhàn dynasty

Shahreis were the pre-Islamic rulers of Gilgit before the advent of the Muslim Trakhane. Shri Buddutt was the last of the Shahreis.

Leitner records John Biddulph's account of the Shahreis

The ruling family of Gilgit are called Ayeshe (heavenly), from the following circumstance. The two states of Hunza and Nagar were formerly one, ruled by a branch of the Shahreis, the ruling family of Gilgit, whose seat of government was Nager. Tradition relates that Mayroo Khan, apparently the first Mohommedan Thum of Nager, some two hundred years after the introduction of the religion of Islamin to Gilgit, married a daughter of the Trakhan of Gilgit who bore him twin sons named Moghlot and Ghirkis. From the former the present ruling family of Nager is descended. The twins are supposed to have shown hostility to one another from their birth. Their father seeing this and unable to settle the question of succession, divided his state between them, giving to Girkis the north and to Moghlot the south bank of the river

== See also ==
Gilgit
