= Gilgit =

Capital city of Pakistan-administered Gilgit-Baltistan

Gilgit گلیٗت (Shina) گلگت (Urdu)
- City in Pakistan-administered Gilgit-Baltistan
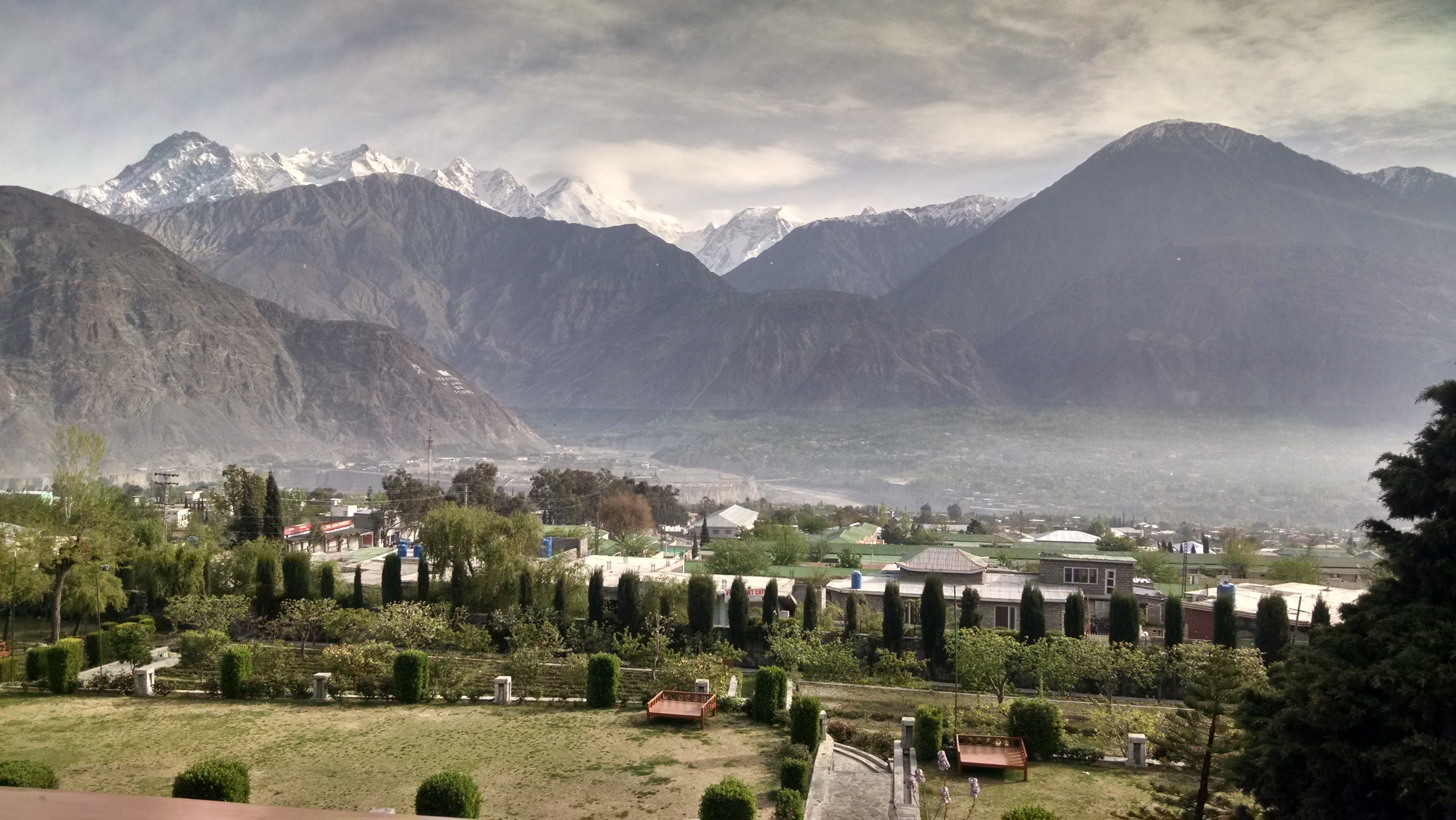
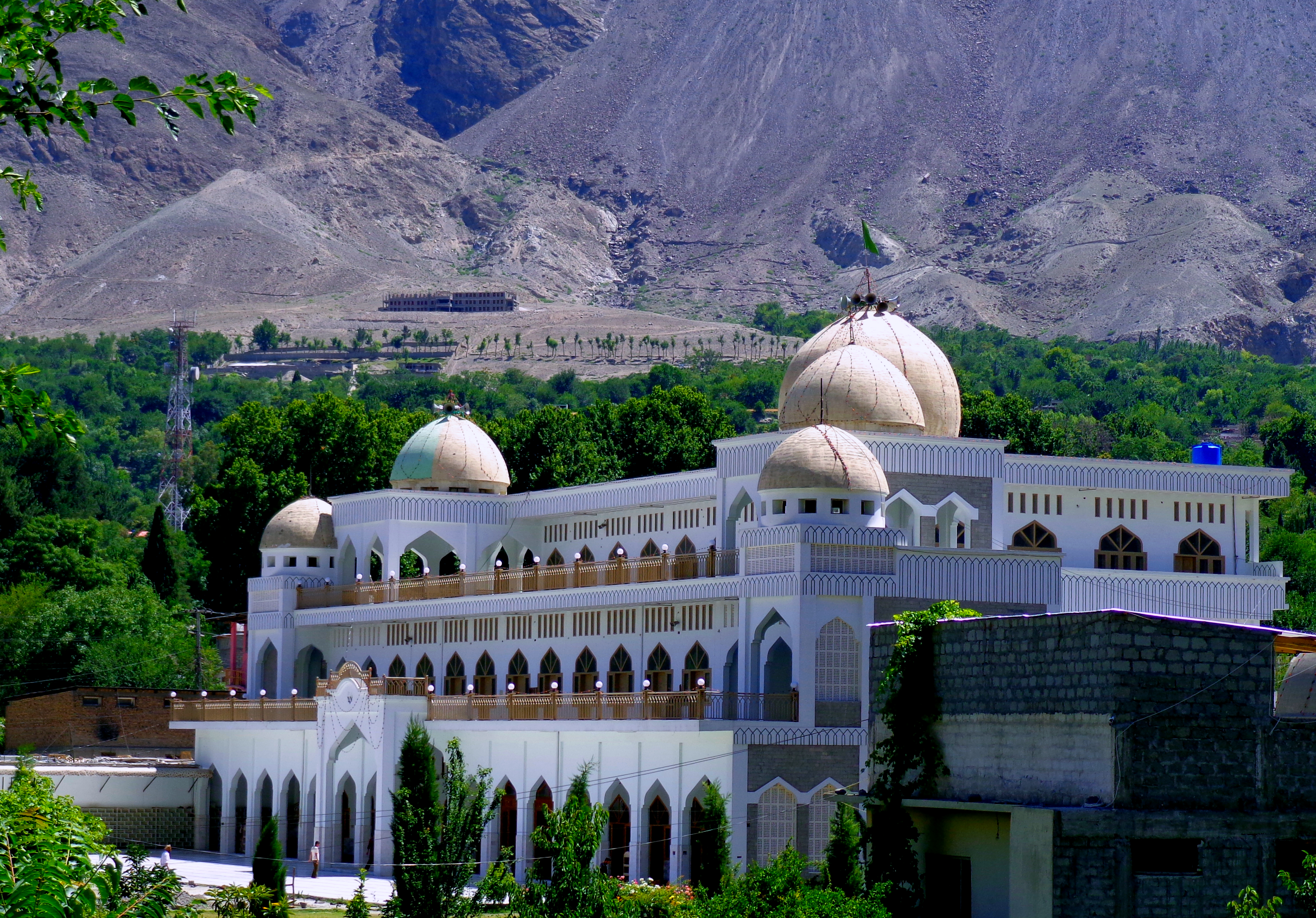
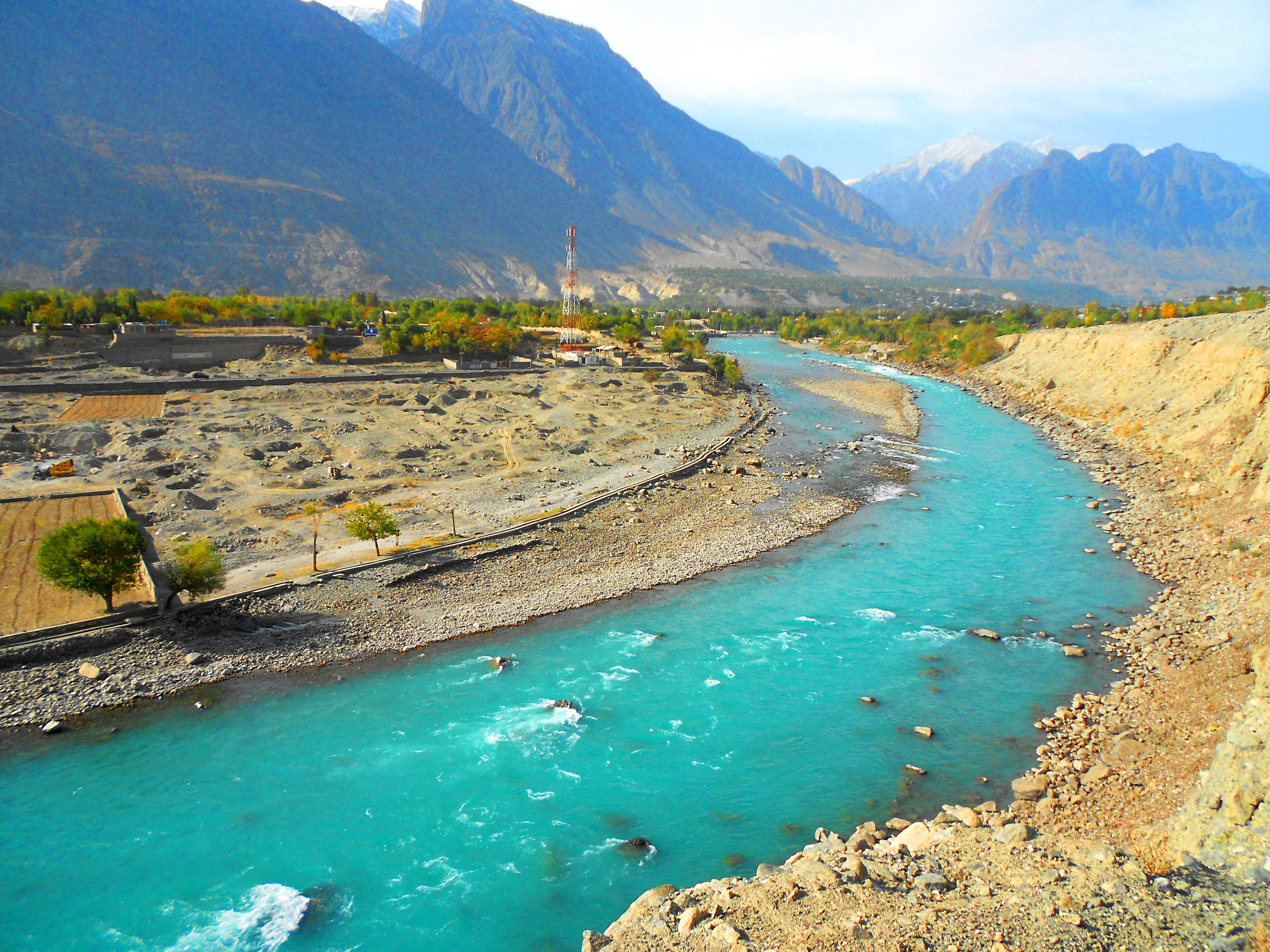
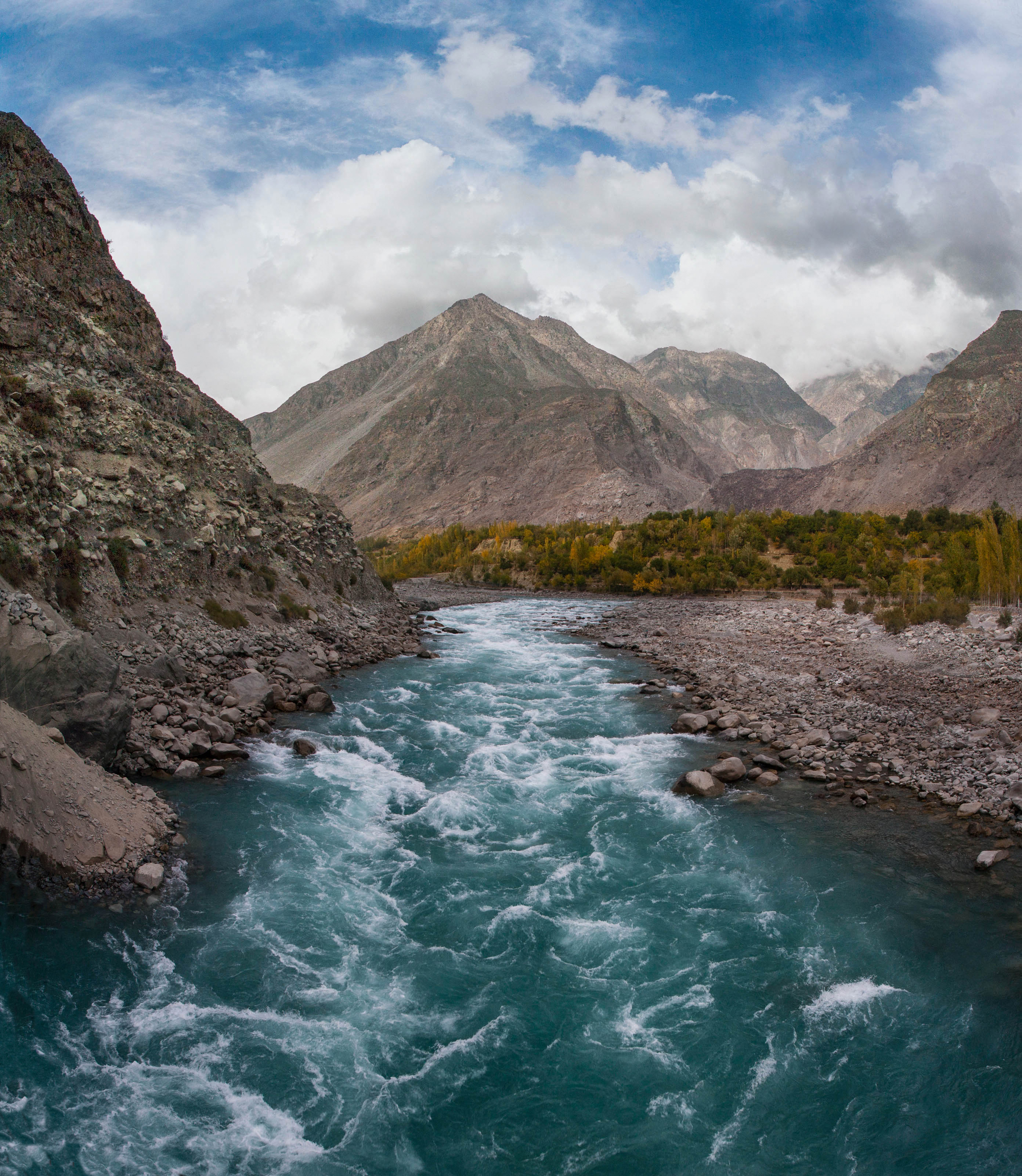
- From top: City of Gilgit, Central Imaamia Mosque, Gilgit River, Rakaposhi Mountain (South View)

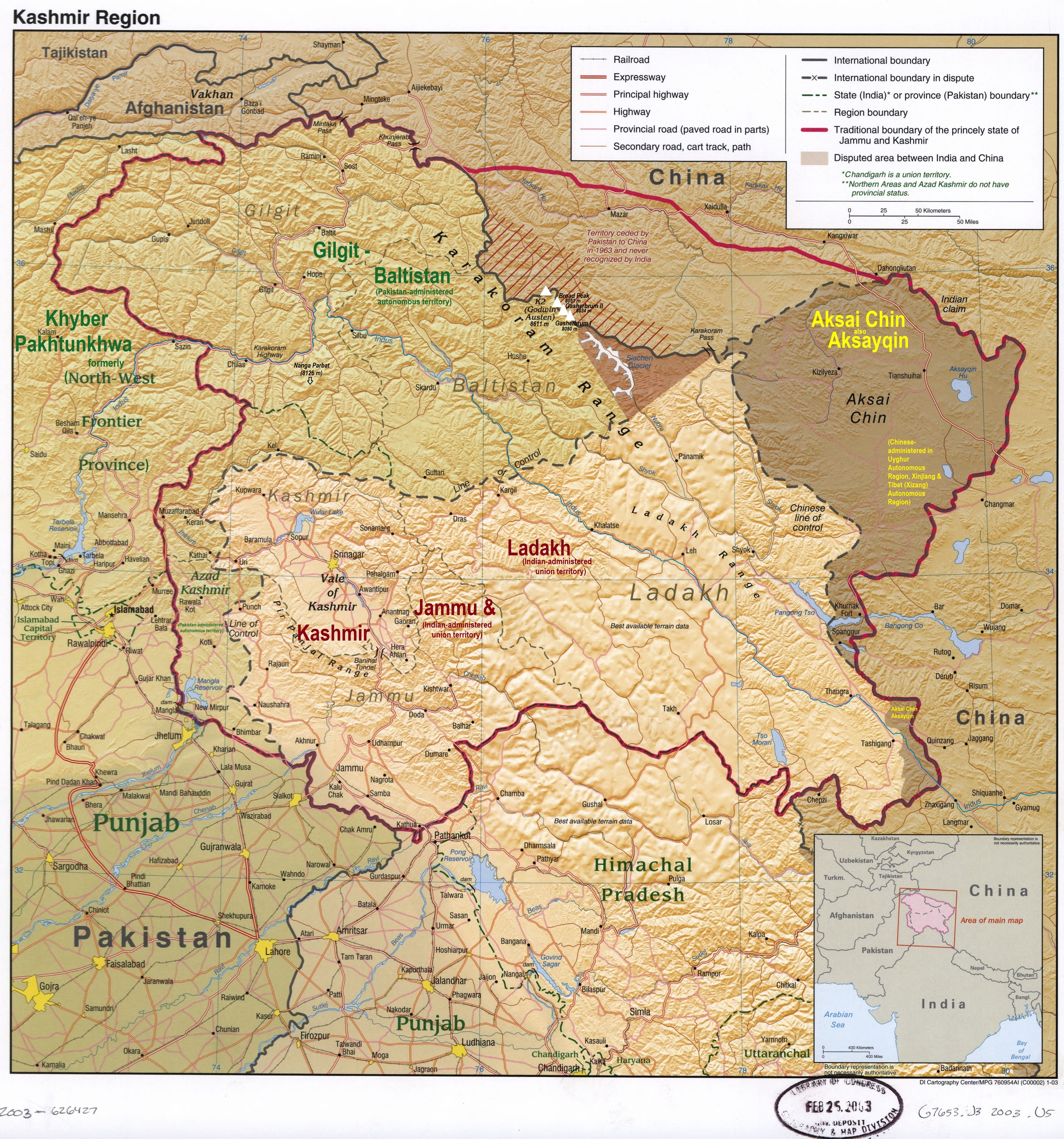
- A map showing Pakistan-administered Gilgit-Baltistan shaded in sage in the disputed Kashmir region
- Interactive map of Gilgit
- Location within Gilgit Baltistan Location within Pakistan Location within India Location within South Asia
- Coordinates: 35°55′15″N 74°18′30″E
- Administering country: Pakistan
- Adm. Unit: Gilgit-Baltistan
- District: Gilgit District

Government
  - Type: Divisional Administration
  - Commissioner: Najeeb Alam (PAS)
  - Deputy Inspector General (DIG): Hassan Raza Khan (PSP)
- Elevation: 1,500 m (4,900 ft)

Population (2011)
  - Total: 261,440

Demographics
  - Language(s): Shina, Urdu
- Time zone: UTC+5:00 (PST)
- Postal code: 1571 – 1xx
- Area code: +92

Gilgit (/ˈɡɪlɡɪt/; Shina: گِلیٗت IPA: [ɡi˧.leː˨˦t̪]; Urdu: گِلْگِت IPA: [ˈɡɪlɡɪt̪]) is the capital and most-populous city in the Pakistani-administered territory of Gilgit-Baltistan in the disputed Kashmir region. It is located in the broad Gilgit Valley near the confluence of Gilgit and Hunza rivers. Gilgit is a major tourist destination in Pakistan, serving as a hub for trekking and mountaineering expeditions in the Karakoram mountain range of northern Pakistan.

Gilgit was once a major centre for Buddhism; it was an important stop on the ancient Silk Road, and today serves as a major junction along the Karakoram Highway with road connections to Kashgar in China as well as the Pakistani cities of Skardu, Chitral, Peshawar, and Islamabad. The economic activity is mainly focused on agriculture, with wheat, maize, and barley as the main crops.

== Name ==
The earliest known mention of the name Gilgit is from the Hatun Rock Inscription, which dates to the 7th century CE and records its name as Giligitta. It was mentioned by al-Biruni in the Arabic form klkt (کلکت) in the 11th century. The etymology of the name is uncertain.

== History ==
=== Early history ===
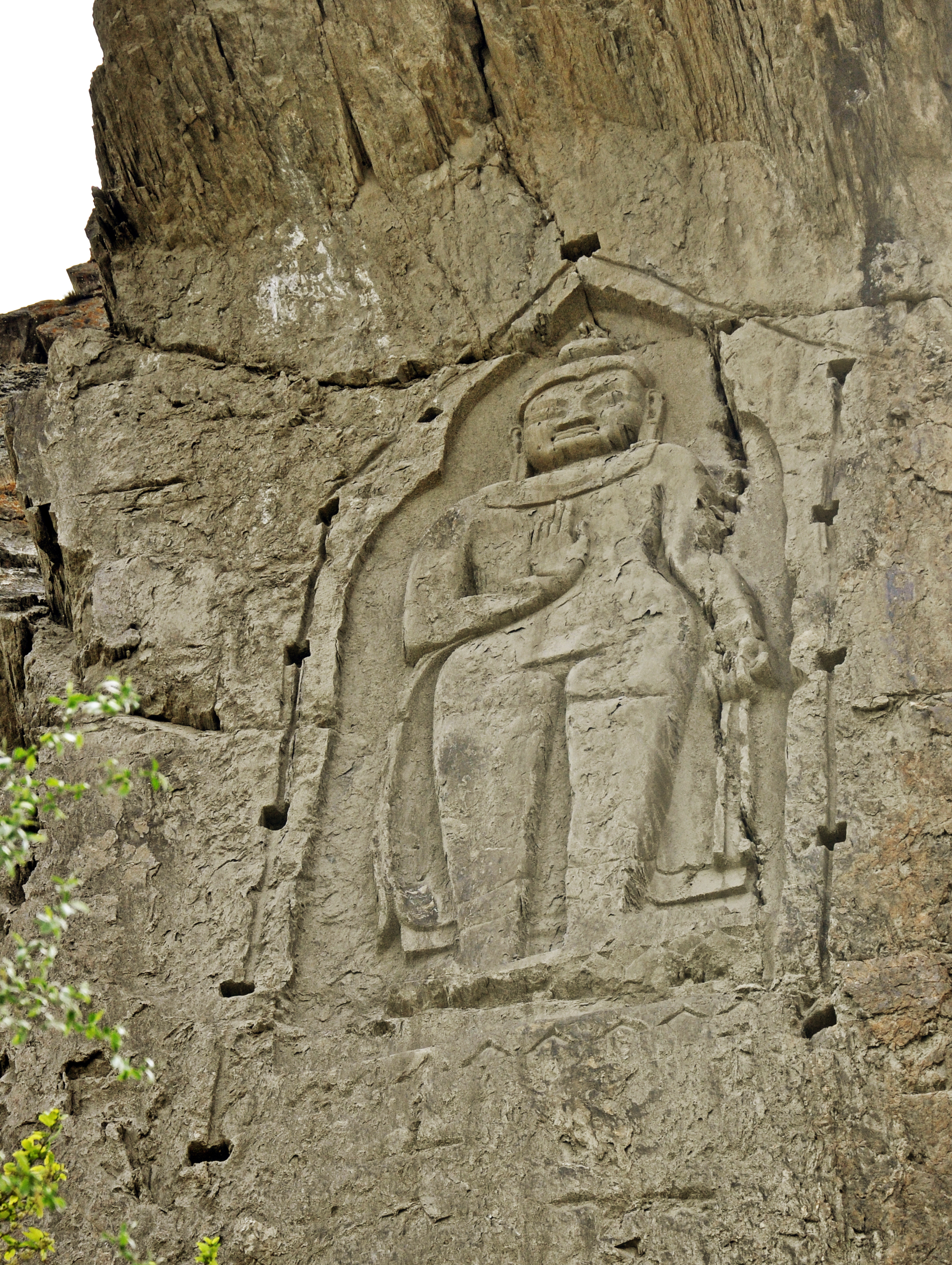
The Kargah Buddha outside of Gilgit dates from around 700 C.E.

Brokpas trace their settlement in the fertile villages of Ladakh back to Gilgit. They have a rich corpus of hymns, songs, and folklore that have been passed down through generations. The Dards and Shins appear in many of the old Pauranic lists of people who lived in the area, with the former also mentioned in Ptolemy's accounts of the region.

Gilgit was an important city on the Silk Road, along which Buddhism spread from South Asia to the rest of Asia. Buddhism was practiced in Gilgit in the past. Two famous Chinese Buddhist pilgrims, Faxian and Xuanzang, traversed Gilgit, according to their accounts.

=== Medieval history ===
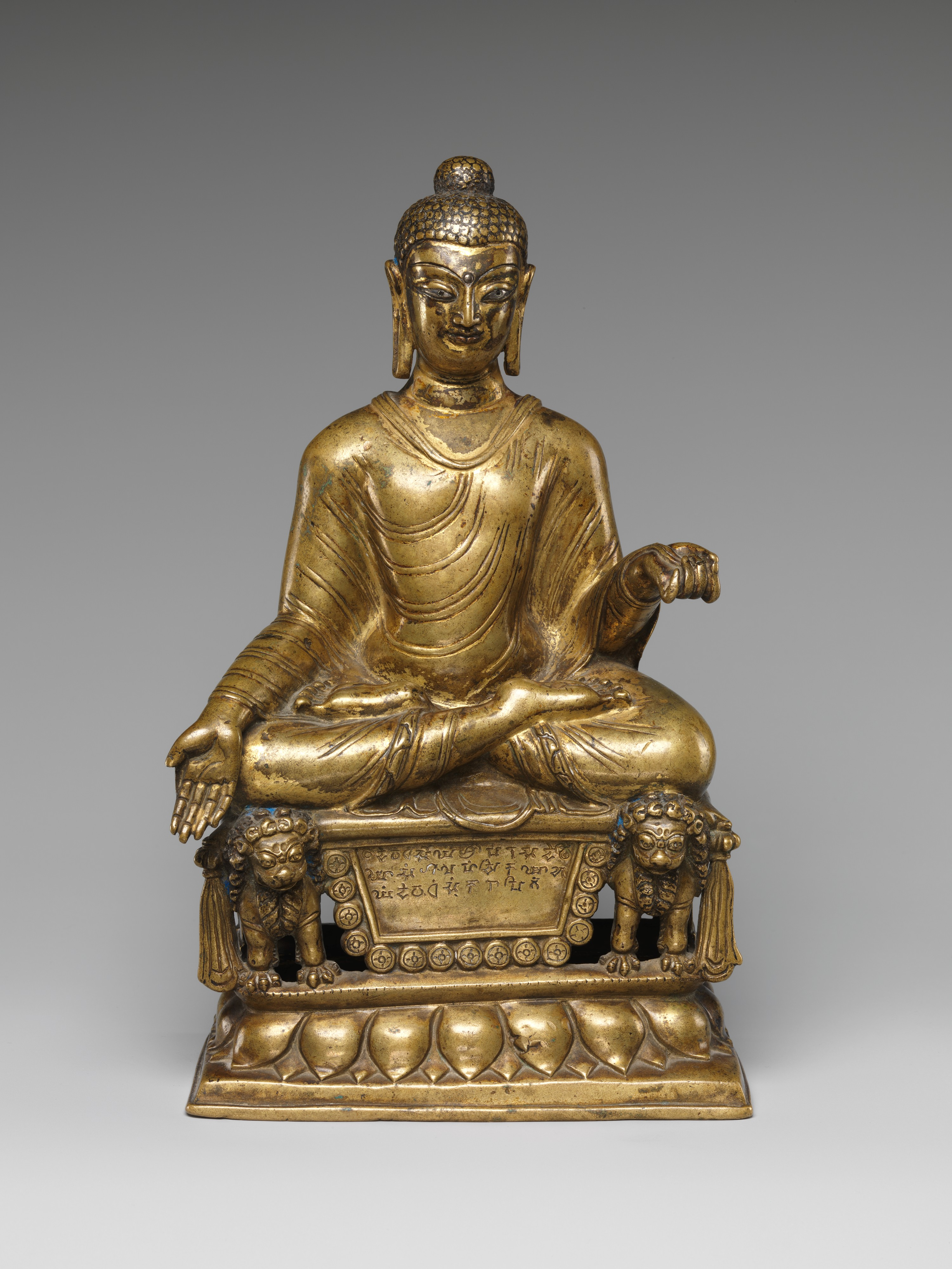
Enthroned Buddha of the Patola Shahis, Gilgit Kingdom, circa 600 CE.

According to Chinese records, in the 600s and 700s, the city was governed by a Buddhist dynasty referred to as Little Balur or Lesser Bolü (Chinese: 小勃律). They are believed to have been the Patola Shahi dynasty mentioned in a Brahmi inscription, and were devout adherents of Vajrayana Buddhism.

In the mid-600s, Gilgit came under Chinese suzerainty after the fall of the Western Turkic Khaganate to the Tang military campaigns in the region. In the late 600s CE, the rising Tibetan Empire wrested control of the region from the Chinese. However, faced with the growing influence of the Umayyad Caliphate and then the Abbasid Caliphate to the west, the Tibetans were forced to ally themselves with the Islamic caliphates. The region was then contested by the Chinese and Tibetan forces, and along with their respective vassal states, until the mid-700s. Chinese records of the region continue until late the 700s, at which time the Tang 's western military campaign was weakened due to the An Lushan Rebellion.

Control of the region was left to the Tibetan Empire. They referred to the region as Bruzha, a toponym that is consistent with the ethnonym Burusho. Tibetan control of the region lasted until the late 800s CE. The region under the Patola Shahis had a vibrant Buddhist culture, as evidenced by the corpus of Gilgit manuscripts.

==== Trakhan dynasty ====
According to John Biddulph:

The period of greatest prosperity was probably under the Shin Ras, whose rule seems to have been peaceable and settled. The whole population, from the rich to the poorest subjects lived by agriculture. According to tradition, Shri Buddutt's rule extended over Chitral, Yassin, Tangir, Darel, Chilas, Gor, Astor, Hunza, Nagar, and Haramosh all of which were held by tributary princes of the same family.

Until the early 19th century, Gilgit was ruled by the Trakhan dynasty. A tradition traces their descent from a legendary prince of Persia, Azur Jamshid, who is said to have fled from his homeland and married Nur Bakht Khatun, the daughter of king Shri Badat of the legendary Shareis dynasty. Sri Badat's faith is theorized to be Hindu by some and Buddhist by others. Shri Badat was known as Adam Khor (literally "man-eater"), often demanding a child a day from his subjects. His demise is still celebrated to this very day by locals in traditional annual celebrations. At beginning of the new year, a Juniper procession walks along the river, in memory of chasing the cannibal king Sri Badat away.

The former rulers had the title of Ra, and there is a reason to suppose that they were at one time Hindus, but for the last five centuries and a half they have been Moslems. The names of the Hindu Ras have been lost, with the exception of the last of their number, Shri Ba'dut. Tradition relates that he was killed by a Mohammedan adventurer, who married his daughter and founded a new dynasty, since called Trakhàn, from a celebrated Ra named Trakhan, who reigned about the commencement of the fourteenth century. The previous rulers—of whom Shri Ba'dut was the last—were called Shahreis.

Azur Jamshid killed Shri Badat with the help of his daughter and ruled for 16 years, after which he abdicated in favour of his wife Nur Bakht Khatun until their son and heir Garg, grew of age and assumed the title of Raja. Garg ruled for 55 years. The dynasty flourished until 1421 when Raja Torra Khan assumed rulership. He ruled as a memorable king until 1475. He distinguished his family line from his stepbrother Shah Rais Khan (who fled to the king of Badakshan, and with whose help he gained Chitral from Raja Torra Khan), as the now-known dynastic name of Trakhan. The descendants of Shah Rais Khan were known as the Ra'issiya dynasty. The best known of Trakhān ruler was Queen Dadi Jawari, who ruled in the 17th century and built canals for irrigation and water supply. Gilgit was ruled for centuries by the Trakhan dynasty, which ended about 1810 with the death of Raja Abbas, the last Trakhan Raja. The rulers of Hunza and Nager also claimed origins from the Trakhans.

=== Modern history ===
The area had been a flourishing tract but prosperity was destroyed by warfare over the next fifty years, and by the great flood of 1841 in which the river Indus was blocked by a landslip below the Hatu Pir and the valley was turned into a lake. After the death of Abbas, Sulaiman Shah, Raja of Yasin, conquered Gilgit. Then, Azad Khan, Raja of Punial, killed Sulaiman Shah, taking Gilgit; followed by Tahir Shah, Raja of Brushal (Nagar), taking Gilgit and killing Azad Khan.

Tair Shah's son Shah Sikandar inherited Gilgit, only to be killed by Gohar Aman, the ethnic Kho Raja of Yasin when he took Gilgit. Then in 1842, Shah Sakandar's brother, Karim Khan, expelled Yasin rulers with the support of a Sikh army from Kashmir Valley. The Sikh general, Nathu Shah, left garrison troops and Karim Khan ruled until Gilgit was ceded by Sikhs to British and then sold by British to Gulab Singh of Jammu in 1846 under the Treaty of Amritsar, and Dogra troops replaced the Sikhs in Gilgit.

Nathu Shah and Karim Khan both transferred their allegiance to Gulab Singh, continuing local administration. When Hunza attacked in 1848, both of them were killed. Gilgit fell to the Hunza and their Yasin and Punial allies but was soon reconquered by Gulab Singh's Dogra troops. With the support of Raja Gohar Aman, Gilgit's inhabitants drove their new rulers out in an uprising in 1852. Raja Gohar Aman then ruled Gilgit until his death in 1860, just before new Dogra forces from Ranbir Singh, son of Gulab Singh, recaptured the fort and town.

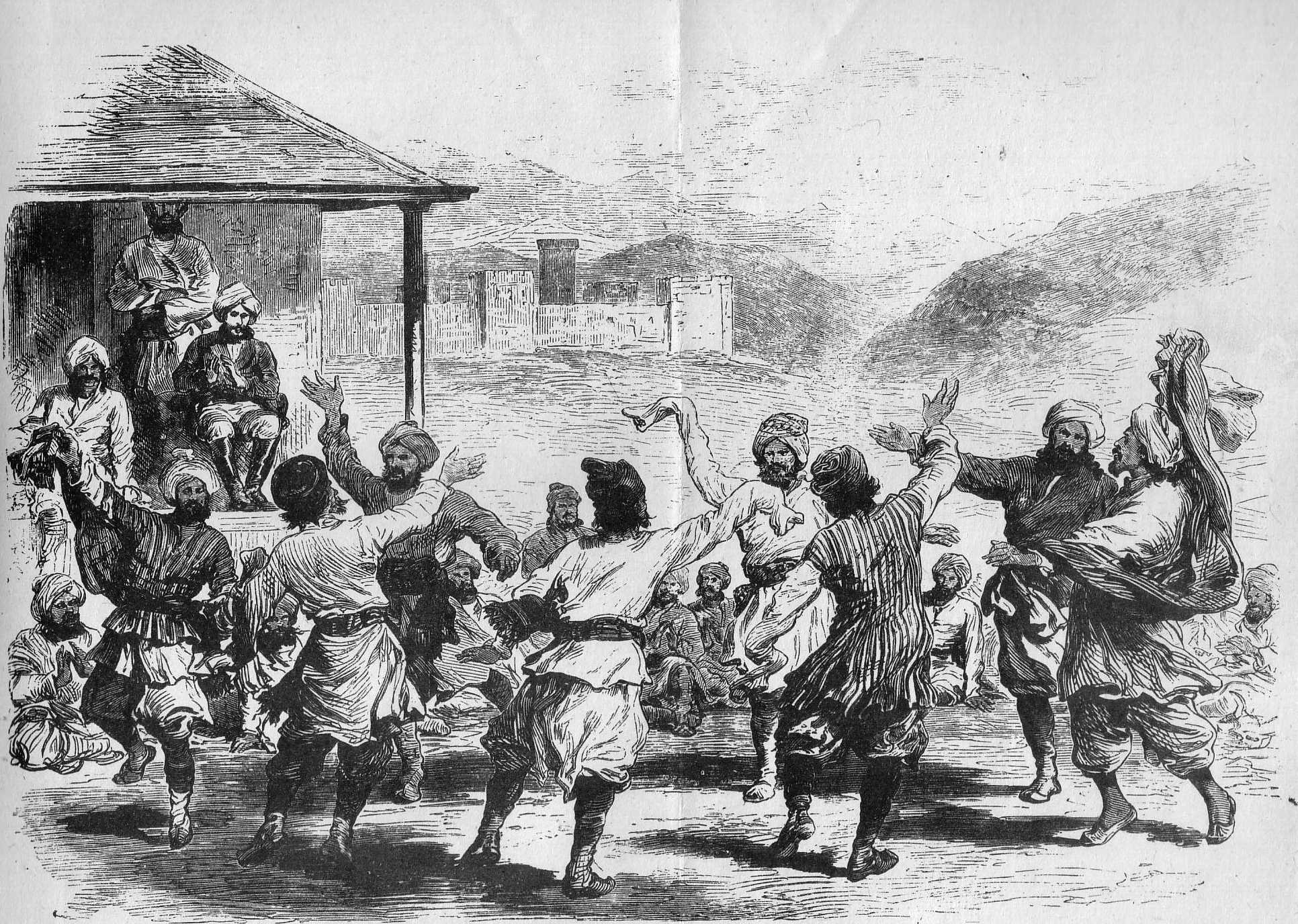
A Dance at Gilgit by G. W. Leitner, 1893

==== Gilgit Agency ====
In 1877, in order to guard against the advance of Russia, the British India Government, acting as the suzerain power of the princely state of Jammu and Kashmir, established the Gilgit Agency. The Agency was re-established under control of the British Resident in Jammu and Kashmir. It comprised the Gilgit Wazarat; the State of Hunza and Nagar; the Punial Jagir; the Governorships of Yasin, Kuh-Ghizr, Ishkoman, and Chilas. In 1935, the British India government leased the Gilgit Tehsil (present-day Gilgit District) from the princely state of Jammu and Kashmir for 60 years.

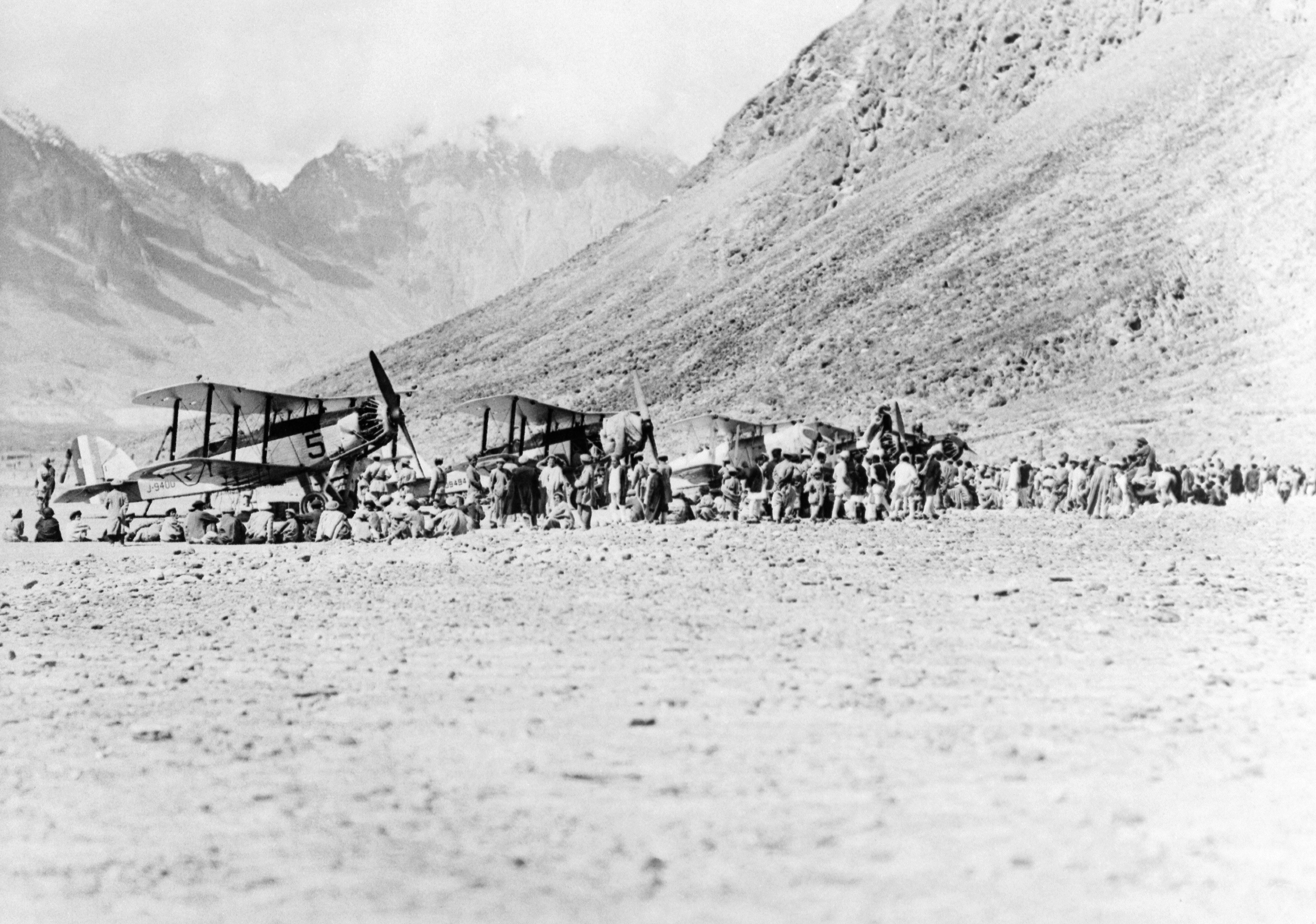
British Westland Wapitis based in Gilgit around 1930

The Tajiks of Xinjiang sometimes enslaved the Gilgiti and Kunjuti Hunza.

==== 1947 Gilgit Rebellion ====
Following partition and independence of the Dominions of Pakistan and India, on 22 October 1947, tribal militias backed by Pakistan crossed the border into Jammu and Kashmir after Poonch rebellion and Jammu Muslim massacre. Hari Singh made a plea to India for assistance and signed the Instrument of Accession, making his state a part of India. India air-lifted troops to defend the Kashmir Valley and the invaders were pushed back behind Uri.

Gilgit's population did not favour the State's accession to India. The Muslims of the frontier ilaqas (Gilgit and the adjoining hill states) had wanted to join Pakistan. Sensing their discontent, Major William Brown, the Maharaja's commander of the Gilgit Scouts, mutinied on 1 November 1947, overthrowing the governor Ghansara Singh. The bloodless coup d'état was planned by Brown to the last detail under the code name "Datta Khel", which was also joined by a rebellious section of the Jammu and Kashmir State Forces under Mirza Hassan Khan. Brown ensured that the treasury was secured and minorities were protected. A provisional government (Aburi Hakoomat) was established by the Gilgit locals with Raja Shah Rais Khan as the president and Mirza Hassan Khan as the commander-in-chief. However, Major Brown had already telegraphed Khan Abdul Qayyum Khan asking Pakistan to take over. Pakistan's political agent, Khan Mohammad Alam Khan, arrived on 16 November and took over the administration of Gilgit. Brown outmaneuvered the pro-Independence group and secured the approval of the mirs and rajas for accession to Pakistan. Browns's actions surprised the British Government.

Gilgit's military leaders did not favour the State's accession to India. The military leaders of the Frontier Districts Province (modern day Gilgit-Baltistan) wanted to join Pakistan. However, there was also written evidence of Gilgit troop leaders wanting to set up an independent Islamic state. Major William Brown in his book Gilgit Rebellion describes the Gilgit troop leaders stating, "We know of course that you are loyal to Pakistan — all Britishers are — but it is not our intention to join Pakistan. We intend to set up an independent Islamic State called the United States of Gilgit, and although we shall keep the friendliest relation with Pakistan we shall in no way owe allegiance to that dominion."

The provisional government lasted 16 days. According to scholar Yaqub Khan Bangash, it lacked sway over the population. The Gilgit rebellion did not have civilian involvement and was solely the work of military leaders, not all of whom had been in favour of joining Pakistan, at least in the short term. Historian Ahmed Hasan Dani says that although there had been a lack of public participation in the rebellion, pro-Pakistan sentiments were intense in the civilian population and their anti-Kashmiri sentiments were also clear. According to various scholars, the people of Gilgit as well as those of Chilas, Koh Ghizr, Ishkoman, Yasin, Punial, Hunza and Nagar joined Pakistan by choice.

=== After 1947 ===
After independence Gilgit became headquarters of Gilgit Agency, including Astore and Baltistan as well. In 1970s various agencies, tribal areas and princely states were merged and reformed to establish Federally Administered Northern Areas. In 2009 Northern Areas were renamed as Gilgit-Baltistan. Today Gilgit is the primary administrative and cultural centre of the region.

== Geography ==
Gilgit is situated in a valley formed by the confluence of the Indus River, Hunza River, and Gilgit River.

=== Climate ===
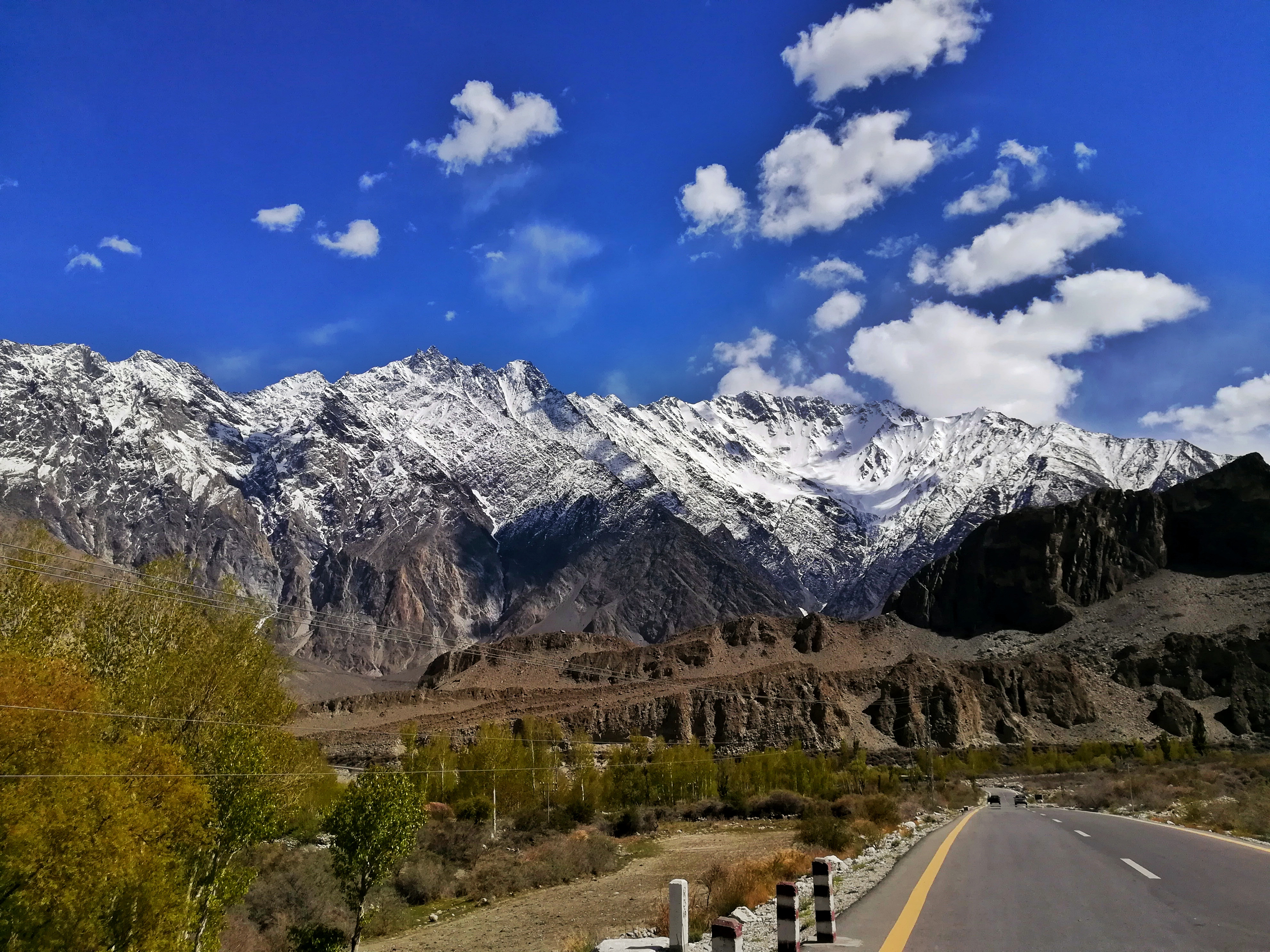
Gilgit is situated amongst some of the world's highest mountain ranges

Gilgit experiences a cold desert climate (Köppen climate classification BWk). Weather conditions in Gilgit are dominated by its geographical location, a valley in a mountainous area, southwest of the Karakoram range.

Gilgit lacks significant rainfall, averaging 120 to 240 mm (4.7 to 9.4 in) annually, as the monsoon breaks against the southern range of Himalayas. Irrigation for land cultivation is obtained from the rivers, abundant with melting snowmelt from higher altitudes.

The summer season is brief and hot, with daily high temperatures occasionally peaking at over 40 °C (104 °F). As a result of this extremity in the weather, landslides and avalanches are frequent in the area.

Climate data for Gilgit
Month	Jan	Feb	Mar	Apr	May	Jun	Jul	Aug	Sep	Oct	Nov	Dec	Year
Record high °C (°F)	17.5 (63.5)	22.0 (71.6)	29.4 (84.9)	37.2 (99.0)	41.5 (106.7)	43.5 (110.3)	46.3 (115.3)	43.8 (110.8)	41.6 (106.9)	36.0 (96.8)	28.0 (82.4)	24.5 (76.1)	46.3 (115.3)
Mean daily maximum °C (°F)	9.6 (49.3)	12.6 (54.7)	18.4 (65.1)	24.2 (75.6)	29.0 (84.2)	34.2 (93.6)	36.2 (97.2)	35.3 (95.5)	31.8 (89.2)	25.6 (78.1)	18.4 (65.1)	11.6 (52.9)	23.9 (75.0)
Mean daily minimum °C (°F)	−2.7 (27.1)	0.4 (32.7)	5.4 (41.7)	9.2 (48.6)	11.8 (53.2)	14.9 (58.8)	18.2 (64.8)	17.5 (63.5)	12.4 (54.3)	6.3 (43.3)	0.4 (32.7)	−2.3 (27.9)	7.6 (45.7)
Record low °C (°F)	−10.0 (14.0)	−8.9 (16.0)	−3.0 (26.6)	1.1 (34.0)	3.9 (39.0)	5.1 (41.2)	10.0 (50.0)	9.8 (49.6)	3.0 (37.4)	−2.5 (27.5)	−8.5 (16.7)	−11.1 (12.0)	−11.1 (12.0)
Average rainfall mm (inches)	4.6 (0.18)	6.7 (0.26)	11.8 (0.46)	24.4 (0.96)	25.1 (0.99)	8.9 (0.35)	14.6 (0.57)	14.9 (0.59)	8.1 (0.32)	6.3 (0.25)	2.4 (0.09)	5.1 (0.20)	107.8 (4.24)
Average relative humidity (%) (at 17:00 PST)	51.3	34.6	26.7	27.6	26.6	23.7	29.8	36.8	36.7	42.2	49.1	55.0	36.7
Source: Pakistan Meteorological Department

=== Climate Change Effects ===
Climate change has adversely affected this region with more rains every year. On 26 August 2022, several villages in Ghizer and Hunza were affected by the flooding, displacing many people.

== Administration ==
The city of Gilgit constitutes a tehsil within Gilgit District. Gilgit District itself is the part of the larger Gilgit Division which is headed by a Commissioner of BPS-20 belonging to Pakistan Administrative service.

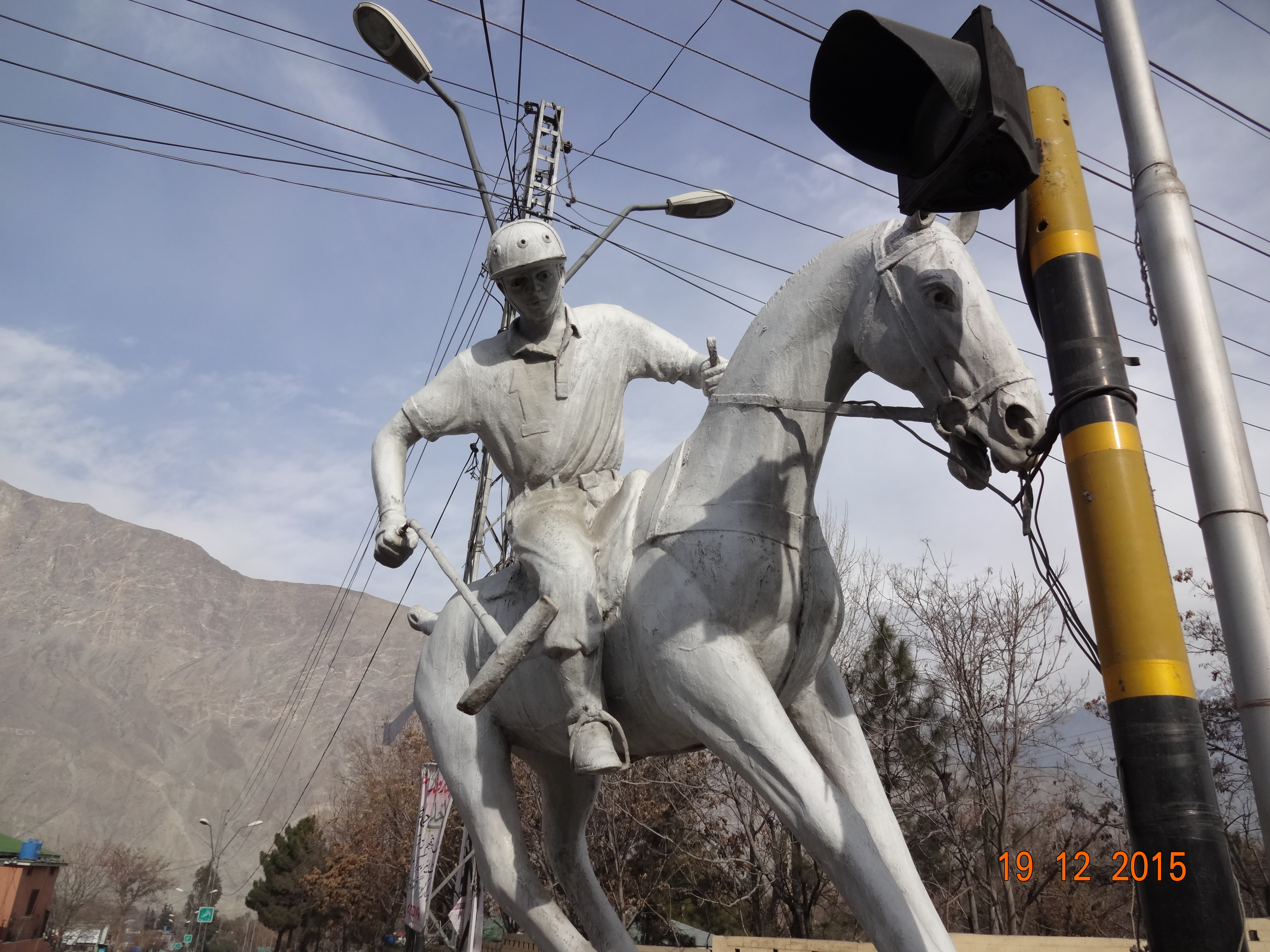
Statue of a Polo player at Jutial; Polo is played annually at the Shandur Polo Ground.

== Transportation ==
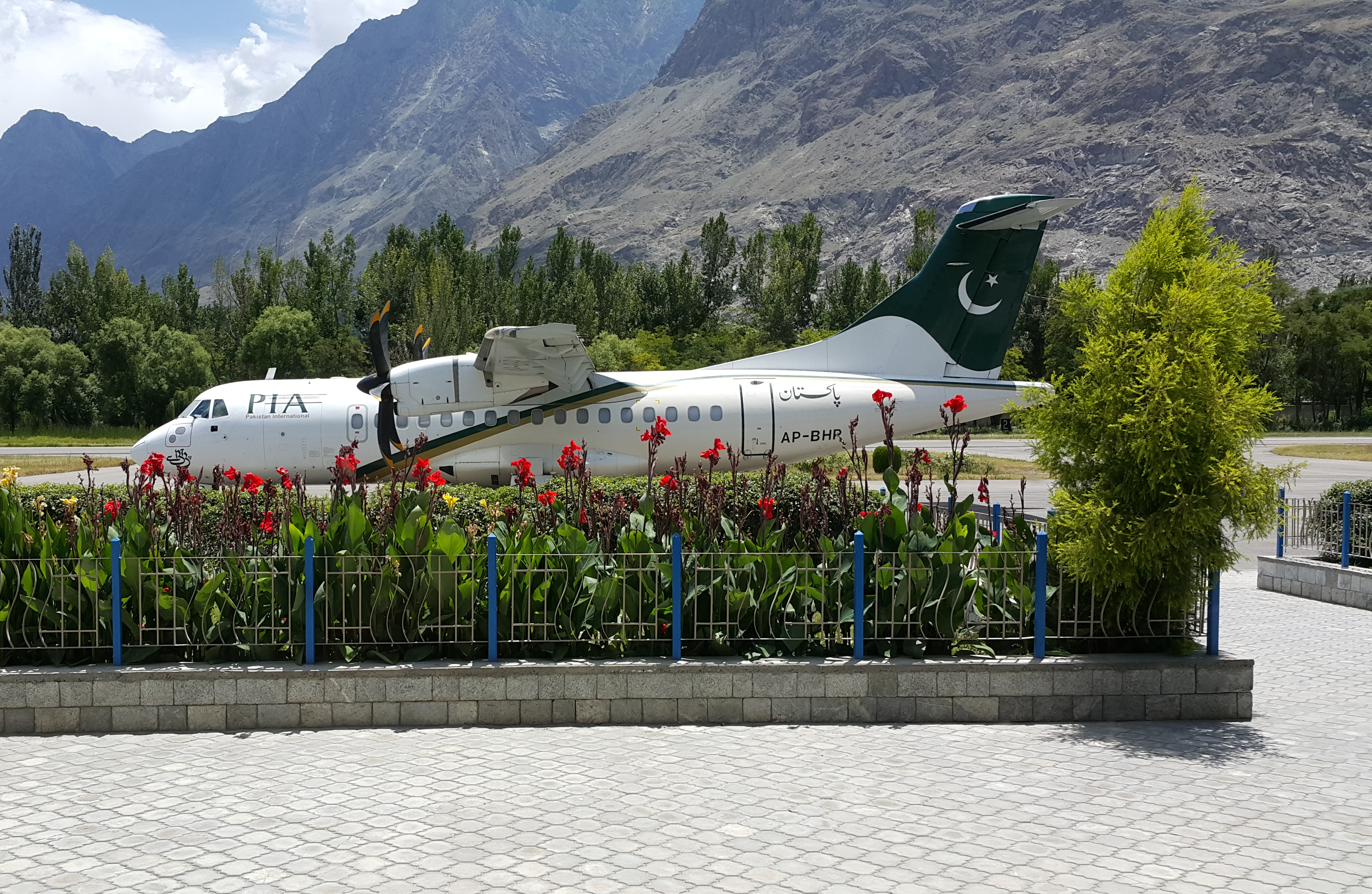
ATR 42-500 at Gilgit Airport

=== Air ===
Gilgit is served by the nearby Gilgit Airport, with direct flights to Islamabad. Pakistan International Airlines (PIA) is the only airline operating in Gilgit. The Government of Pakistan is planning to build a new international standard airport in Gilgit to meet the requirements of international tourists and demand from domestic investors.

=== Road ===
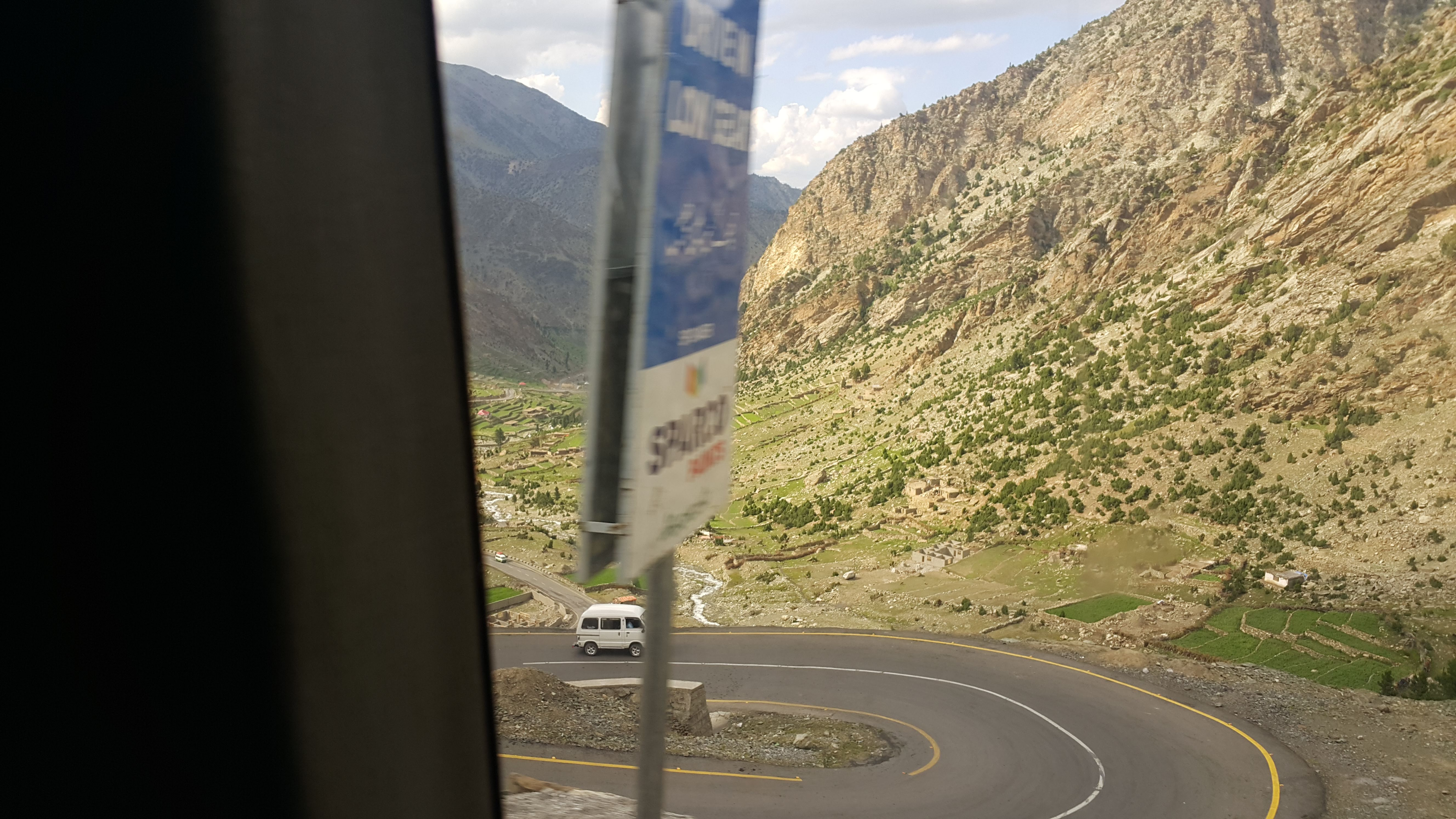
National Highway N-15 has abrupt direction changes which is a challenge for drivers who use this route to reach Gilgit

Gilgit is located approximately 10 km (6.2 mi) from the Karakoram Highway (KKH). The roadway is being upgraded as part of the China–Pakistan Economic Corridor. The KKH connects Gilgit to Chilas, Dasu, Besham, Mansehra, Abbottabad, and Islamabad in the south. Gilgit is connected to Karimabad and Sust in the north, with further connections to the Chinese cities of Tashkurgan, Upal and Kashgar in Xinjiang. Gilgit is also linked to Chitral in the west, and Skardu to the east. The road to Skardu will be upgraded to a 4-lane road at a cost of $475 million.

Transport companies such as the Silk Route Transport Pvt, Masherbrum Transport Pvt and Northern Areas Transport Corporation (NATCO,), offer passenger road transport between Islamabad, Gilgit, Sust, and Kashgar and Tashkurgan in China.

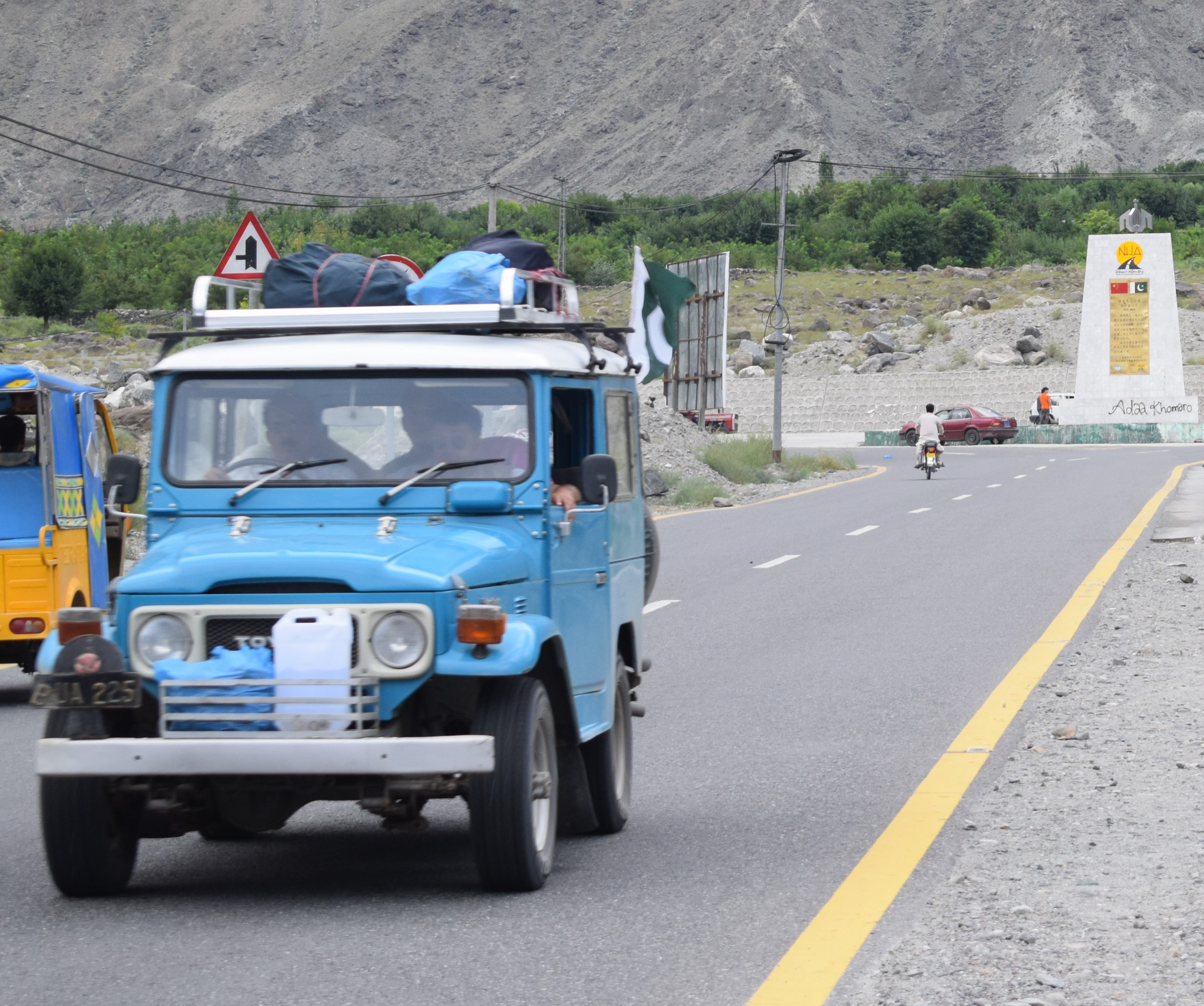
"Jeep" used to be the widely used vehicle in the region till late 2000s

The Astore-Burzil Pass Road, linking Gilgit to Srinagar was closed in 1978.

=== Rail ===
Gilgit is not served by any rail connections. Long-term plans for the China–Pakistan Economic Corridor call for the construction of the 682 km (424 mi) long Khunjerab Railway, which is expected to be completed in 2030 that would also serve Gilgit.

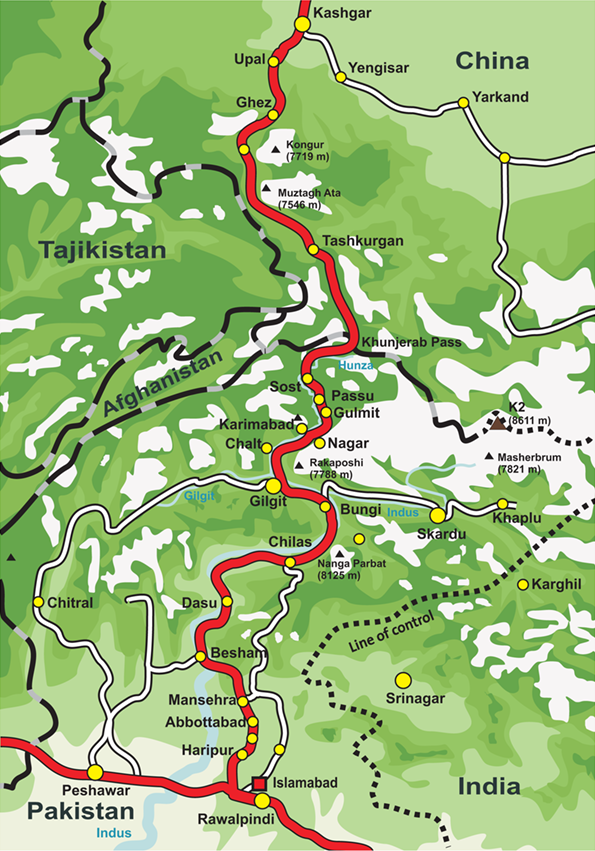
Route of the Karakoram Highway

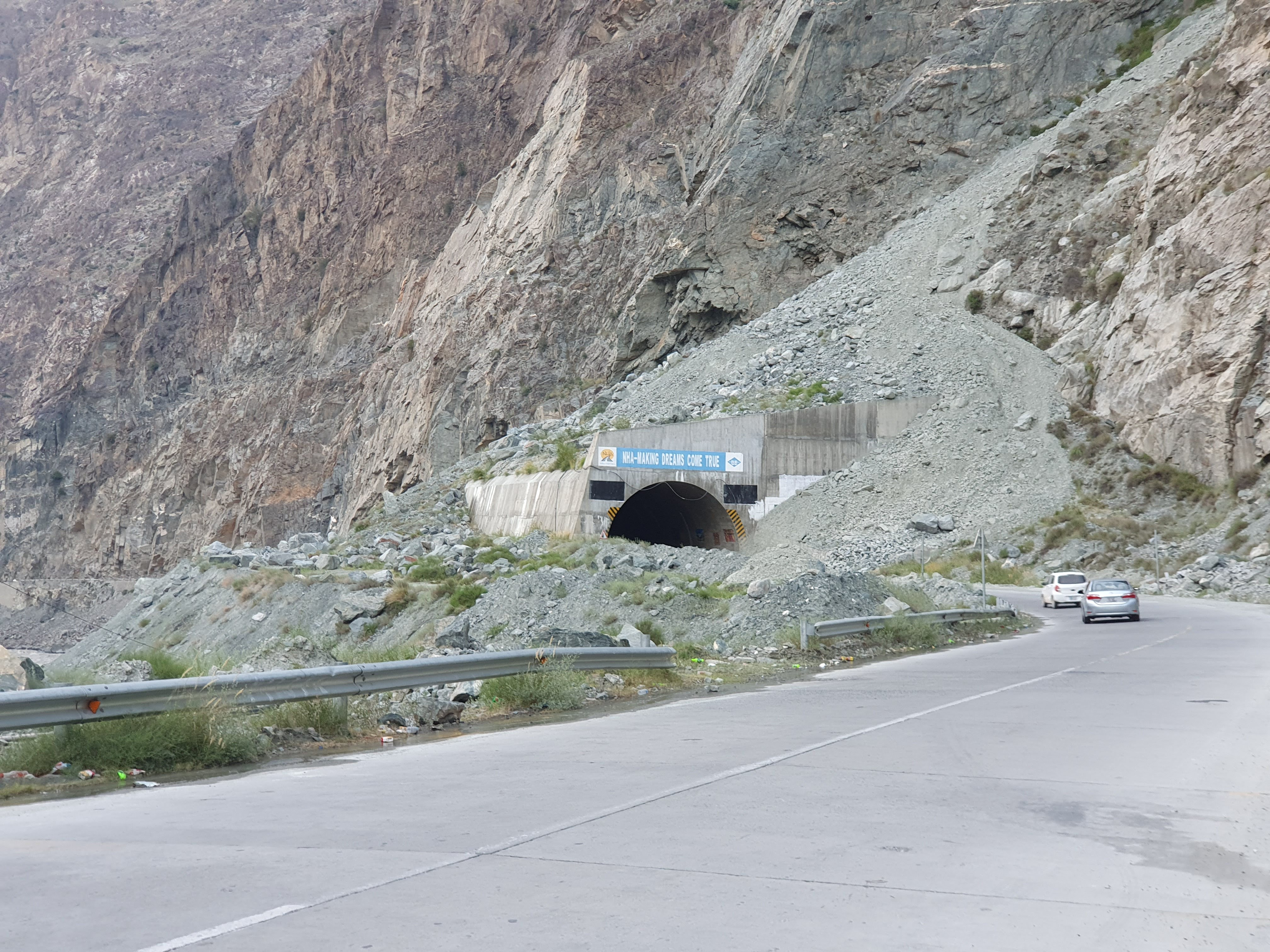
Tunnels are common in Gilgit

== Education ==
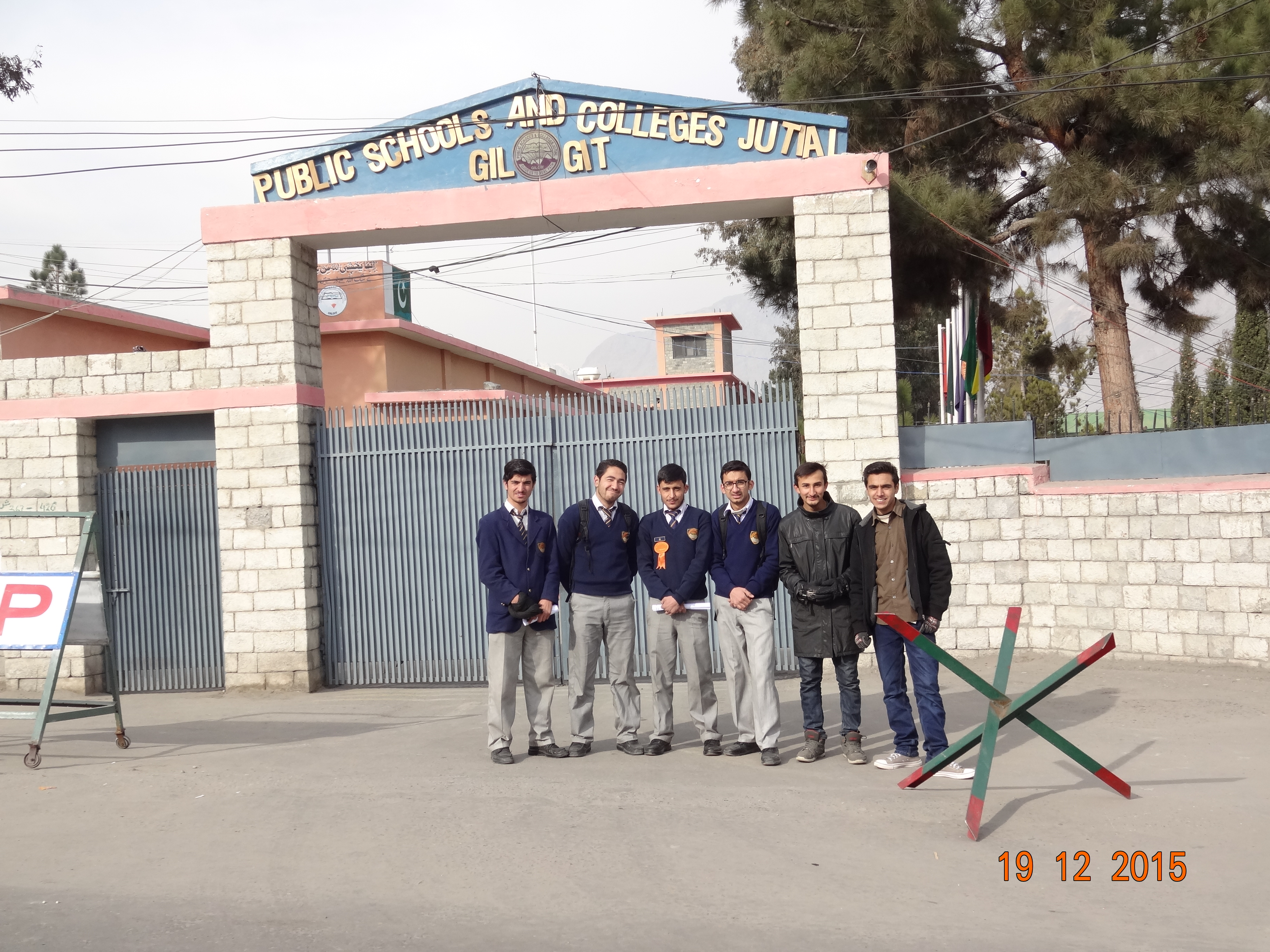
Public Schools and Colleges Jutial, Gilgit

The Karakoram International University was established by the federal government in Gilgit in 2002. It has satellite campuses at Hunza, Ghizer and Chilas. The KIU campus at Skardu was later promoted to an independent university, the University of Baltistan, in 2017.

== Basic facilities ==
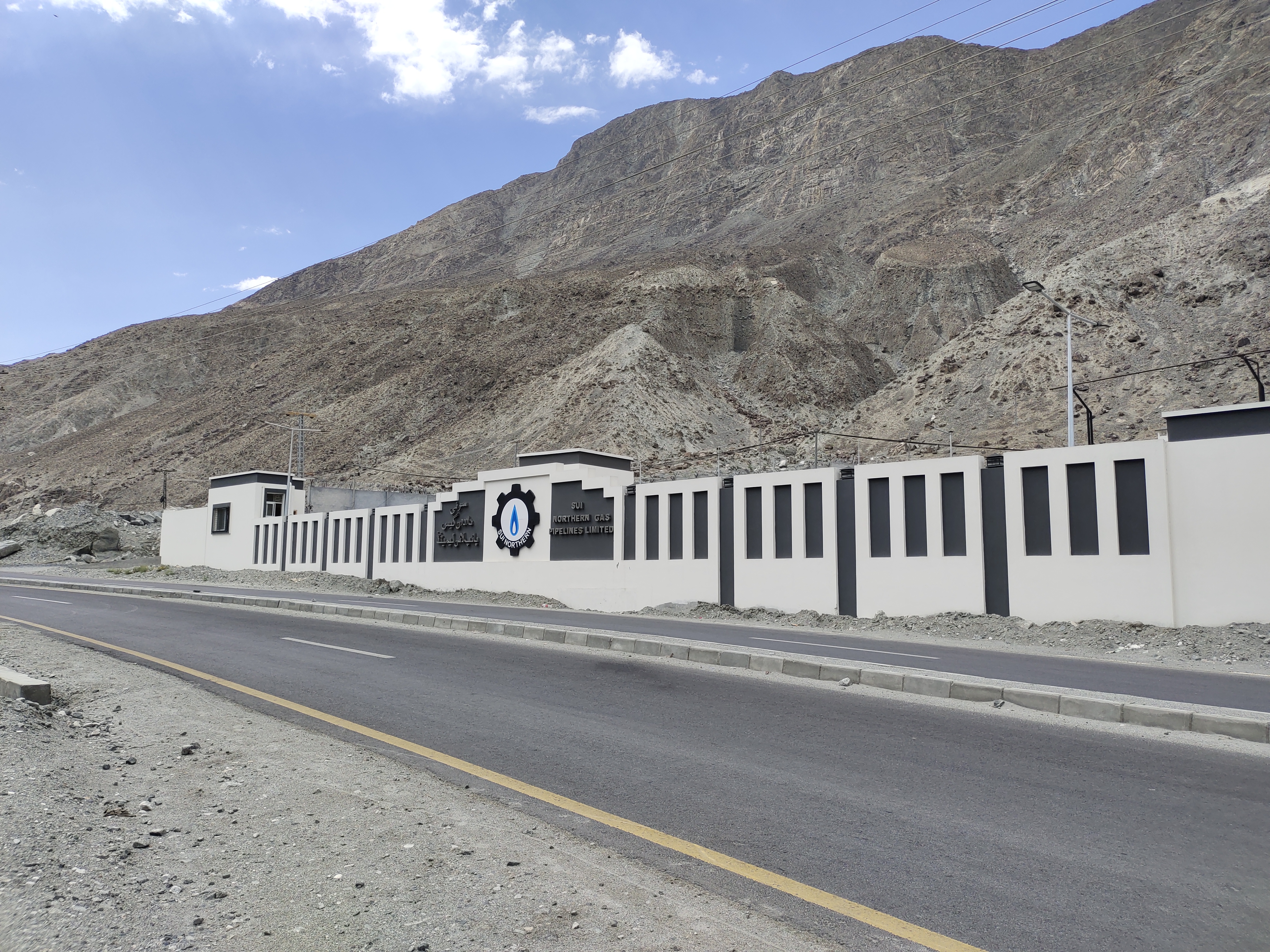
Sui Northern Gas Pipelines Limited Plant in Gilgit

Gilgit has not received gas pipeline infrastructure since Pakistan's independence, unlike other cities. Through the importation of gas cylinders from other provinces, many private gas contractors offer gas cylinders. The LPG (Liquefied Petroleum Gas) Air Mix Plant project by Sui Northern Gas Pipelines Limited was unveiled in 2020, with the goal of bringing gas facility to Gilgit. This will significantly reduce deforestation, as the public currently uses wood from trees for heating and lighting purposes. The first head office has been built in Gilgit.

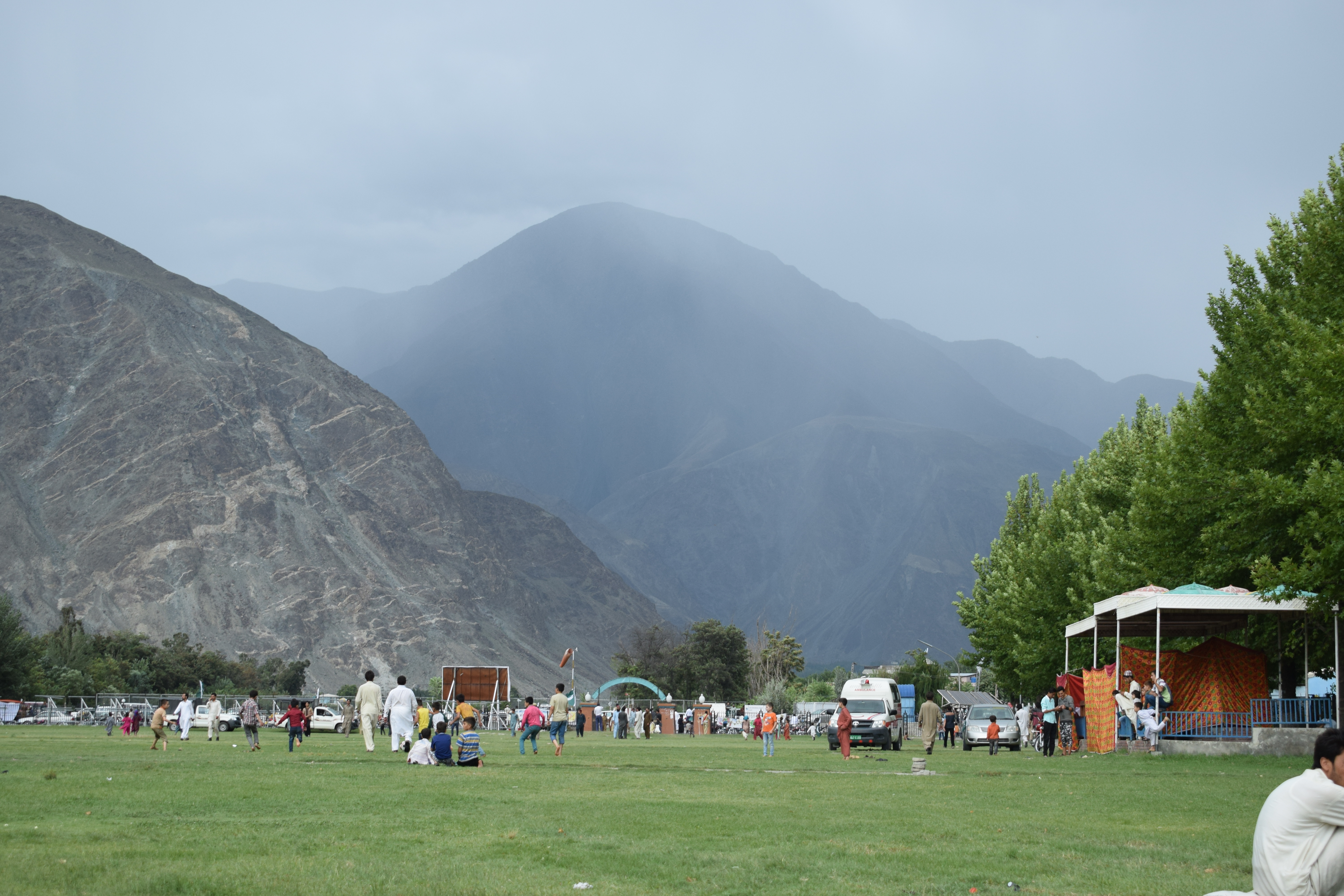
CAA Park Gilgit

Severe flash floods in Gilgit-Baltistan have exposed critical infrastructure failures, with residents in the Diamer, Danyor, and Ghanche districts facing acute shortages of drinking water, electricity, road access, and communication. Despite repeated appeals, local authorities have failed to restore basic services, prompting threats of public protests. The crisis underscores ongoing administrative neglect and inadequate disaster response in the area.

== Sister cities ==
- Skardu, Baltistan
- Kashgar, China (since May 2009)

== See also ==
- Chamogarh
