= Chamogarh =

chamogarh
- Village
- Location within Gilgit Baltistan
- Coordinates: 35°48′31″N 74°33′36″E
- Country: Pakistan
- Region: Gilgit-Baltistan
- Division: Gilgit Division
- District: Gilgit District
- Elevation: 1,500 m (4,900 ft)
- Population: 300 house holds
- Time zone: UTC+5.30 (IST)
- Postal code: 15100
- Area code: 05811

Chamogarh (Urdu: چھموگڑھ) is a village situated 28 km from Gilgit city, in the Gilgit-Baltistan region of Pakistan. The name Chamogarh is derived from the word Chamu, which was the name of a lady in history, and Garh, meaning a place of residence. Therefore, Chamogarh means Chamu's living place. The village is connected to other areas through the Danyor Alam bridge road, which links it to Jalalabad, Danyor, Oshkhindass, and Alam bridge. It is also linked to Harating, Jalalabad, Gilgit City, Hunza, and Khunjerab top to China on its western side. Chamogarh is home to one of the oldest bridges in Gilgit Baltistan, Partab bridge (Partab Pul), which connects Chamogarh to Parri Bangla over the Gilgit River.

The majority of the population in Chamogarh speaks Kohistani, while Pashto is spoken by a minority (3%), and other languages account for the remaining 1%. The village has several educational institutions, including Boys Middle School, Girls School, Al Mehboob Model Academy (ALMS), and Iqra School. These schools collectively have over 1500 enrolled students.

Agriculture is the primary livelihood for the people of Chamogarh, with wheat and maize being the primary crops grown. The fertile land of the village is also suitable for the growth of fruits such as grapes, almonds, apricots, amluk, meetha, pomegranate, and apples.

Despite its small size, Chamogarh has produced government officers in both the army and the Gilgit-Baltistan administration.
